= MarShon Brooks =

American basketball player (born 1989)

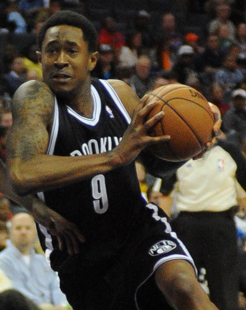
- Brooks with the Brooklyn Nets in 2012

Personal information
- Born: January 26, 1989 (age 37) Long Branch, New Jersey, U.S.
- Listed height: 6 ft 5 in (1.96 m)
- Listed weight: 200 lb (91 kg)

Career information
- High school: Tucker (Tucker, Georgia)
- College: Providence (2007–2011)
- NBA draft: 2011: 1st round, 25th overall pick
- Drafted by: Boston Celtics
- Playing career: 2011–2024
- Position: Shooting guard / small forward
- Number: 9, 12, 2, 8, 6

Career history
- 2011–2013: New Jersey / Brooklyn Nets
- 2013–2014: Boston Celtics
- 2014: →Maine Red Claws
- 2014: Golden State Warriors
- 2014: →Santa Cruz Warriors
- 2014: Los Angeles Lakers
- 2014–2015: Olimpia Milano
- 2015–2018: Jiangsu Dragons
- 2018–2019: Memphis Grizzlies
- 2019–2021; 2022–2024: Guangdong Southern Tigers

Career highlights
- CBA International MVP (2021); CBA All Import Player First Team (2021); CBA All-Star (2017); NBA All-Rookie Second Team (2012); Third-team All-American – AP (2011); First-team All-Big East (2011)
- Stats at NBA.com
- Stats at Basketball Reference

MarShon Scitif Brooks (born January 26, 1989) is an American former professional basketball player. Standing at 6 ft 6 in (1.98 m), he played at shooting guard and small forward positions. Originally drafted by the Boston Celtics with the 25th pick in the 2011 NBA draft, he was immediately traded to the New Jersey Nets.

== Early life ==
Brooks was born in Long Branch, New Jersey, and lived there until he was six years old, when his family moved to Stone Mountain, Georgia. He attended Tucker High School. Considered a three-star recruit by 247Sports.com, Brooks was listed as the No. 126 shooting guard and the No. 521 player in the nation in 2007.

== College career ==
Brooks played collegiate basketball in the Big East Conference for the Providence Friars. Brooks saw little playing time his freshman (2007–2008) and sophomore (2008–2009) seasons.

Brooks began to become a major contributor for the Friars in his junior season (2009–2010). He averaged 14.2 points a game, shooting 46.7% from the field. Brooks posted 20 points or more in several games, including a 24-point game on 8-of-10 shooting against Vermont on November 24, 2009, a game in which he also picked up five steals. He recorded 25 points and five rebounds on January 23, 2010, against South Florida.

As a senior in 2010–2011, Brooks averaged 24.6 points per game, first in the Big East. Besides leading his team in scoring and rebounding, he was second in Division I in scoring. He was named to the 30-player national midseason watchlist and was one of 20 national finalists for the 2011 John R. Wooden Award.

On February 23, 2011, Brooks scored 52 points against Notre Dame, tying the school record held by Marvin Barnes, and breaking the Big East record of 48 points in a game. He scored 35 points in the second half alone, 15 of them in the final 2:57, leading a comeback that would fall short as Notre Dame picked up the win, 94–93. Brooks scored his final points on a 3-point shot with two seconds remaining, leaving the Friars down a point. He hit 20-of-28 shots on the night. Fellow Friar Eric Murdock held the previous record of 48, set against Pittsburgh in 1991. It was also Brooks' second 40-point game of the season; he had 43 in a loss at Georgetown on February 5, 2011. He became only the third player in Providence history with two 40-point games in a season.

On March 5, 2011, Brooks scored 28 points in a regular season-ending win over Rutgers, giving him 468 points on the Big East regular season. That broke the previous single-season conference mark of 462 points set by Connecticut's Donyell Marshall in 1994.

Brooks finished his college career with 1,629 points, ninth all-time for Providence. On March 28, 2011, he was named a third-team Associated Press All-American. He was picked to the Fourth Team All-America by Fox Sports.

Brooks left Providence College with two months left in his senior year to focus on preparing for the 2011 NBA draft. Brooks left school two classes short of obtaining his degree. His professional debut was delayed by the 2011 NBA lockout, so he took the time to return to Providence College to continue work on his degree and also work out with the Friars men's basketball team.

== Professional career ==
=== New Jersey/Brooklyn Nets (2011–2013) ===
Brooks was drafted by the Boston Celtics with the 25th pick in the 2011 NBA draft, but the Celtics immediately traded Brooks to the New Jersey Nets for the Nets' 27th overall pick in the draft (JaJuan Johnson) and a second round pick in the 2014 NBA draft. On February 8, 2012, Brooks was selected to participate in the 2012 BBVA Rising Stars Challenge. He was drafted by Team Chuck. On May 14, 2012, the NBA announced that Brooks finished 10th in the Rookie of the Year voting with 4 total points. The winner was Cleveland Cavaliers guard Kyrie Irving. A few days later the NBA announced that Brooks had been named to the NBA All-Rookie Second Team. In 56 games Brooks averaged 12.6 points (3rd among rookies), 3.6 rebounds, 2.3 assists and 0.93 steals.

On November 9, 2012, Brooks sprained his left ankle during the team's morning shootaround. Brooks would miss two games. In the beginning of the 2012–13 season, Brooks saw decreased playing time from Nets head coach Avery Johnson. Brooks admitted to having "confidence issues" early in the year. When P.J. Carlesimo became the team's coach, he gave Brooks more minutes. When Brooks was asked about Carlesimo he said, "I've got a lot more confidence. That's helped my game a lot."

On April 3, 2013, in place of the injured Joe Johnson against the Cleveland Cavaliers, Brooks scored a career-high in 27 points on 12-of-16 shooting in a 113–95 win.

=== Boston Celtics (2013–2014) ===
Brooks was traded back to the Boston Celtics on July 12, 2013, along with Keith Bogans, Kris Humphries, Gerald Wallace, Kris Joseph and three first-round picks in a blockbuster deal that sent Celtics stars Kevin Garnett, Paul Pierce and Jason Terry as well as prospect D.J. White to the Nets. He was one of two players traded to the team that originally drafted them: Brooks was drafted by Boston in 2011 and Kris Joseph was drafted by Boston in the 2012 NBA draft.

On January 1, 2014, he was assigned to the Maine Red Claws. On January 9, he was recalled by the Celtics.

=== Golden State Warriors (2014) ===
On January 15, 2014, a three-team trade was completed involving the Boston Celtics, the Golden State Warriors, and the Miami Heat. The Celtics sent Brooks and Jordan Crawford to the Warriors. In exchange, the Celtics received Joel Anthony, a protected future draft pick Philadelphia sent to Miami in an earlier trade, and a 2016 second-round draft pick from the Heat. The Heat also received Toney Douglas from the Warriors as part of the deal.

On February 1, 2014, he was assigned to the Santa Cruz Warriors. He was recalled the next day. On February 11, 2014, he was reassigned to Santa Cruz. He was recalled the next day.

=== Los Angeles Lakers (2014) ===
On February 19, 2014, Brooks was traded along with Kent Bazemore from the Golden State Warriors to the Los Angeles Lakers in exchange for Steve Blake.

In July 2014, Brooks joined the Sacramento Kings for the 2014 NBA Summer League.

=== Emporio Armani Milano (2014–2015) ===
On August 8, 2014, Brooks signed a one-year deal with Emporio Armani Milano of the Italian League. In 40 league games for Milano, he averaged 13.6 points, 3.3 rebounds and 2.0 assists per game.

=== Jiangsu Dragons (2015–2018) ===
On August 5, 2015, Brooks signed with the Jiangsu Dragons of the Chinese Basketball Association (CBA).

=== Memphis Grizzlies (2018–2019) ===
On March 27, 2018, the Memphis Grizzlies announced that they had signed Brooks to a 10-day contract. On April 6, 2018, Brooks signed a multi-year contract with the Grizzlies.

As part of a three-team trade with the Washington Wizards, various news sources announced that MarShon Brooks would be traded to the Phoenix Suns. Reportedly, however, the Suns were led to believe that, rather than MarShon Brooks, they would receive Dillon Brooks in the trade deal. After a delay, it was finally reported that the Grizzlies refused to trade Dillon Brooks and ended their participation in the deal, which meant they would not receive Kelly Oubre Jr. from the Wizards.

On January 3, 2019, the Grizzlies traded Brooks, Wayne Selden Jr. and two future second round picks to the Chicago Bulls in exchange for Justin Holiday. He was waived by the Bulls on January 7 without appearing in a single game for the franchise.

=== Guangdong Southern Tigers (2019–2024) ===
On February 20, 2019, Brooks signed with the Guangdong Southern Tigers for the rest of the 2018–19 Chinese Basketball Association season. He returned to Guangdong for the 2019–20 season, and continued with the team in 2020–21. After not playing in 2021–22, he returned to Guangdong in 2022–23 and 2023–24.

== Career statistics ==
Legend
GP	Games played	GS	Games started	MPG	Minutes per game
FG%	Field-goal percentage	3P%	3-point field-goal percentage	FT%	Free-throw percentage
RPG	Rebounds per game	APG	Assists per game	SPG	Steals per game
BPG	Blocks per game	PPG	Points per game	PIR	Performance index rating
**Bold**	Career high

=== NBA ===
==== Regular season ====
Year	Team	GP	GS	MPG	FG%	3P%	FT%	RPG	APG	SPG	BPG	PPG
2011–12	New Jersey	56	**47**	**29.4**	.428	.313	.764	**3.6**	2.3	.9	.3	12.6
2012–13	Brooklyn	**73**	2	12.5	.463	.273	.734	1.4	1.0	.5	.2	5.4
2013–14	Boston	10	0	7.3	.375	.500	.786	1.9	.4	.1	.1	3.1
2013–14	Golden State	7	0	2.1	.385	.000	.750	.7	.0	.1	.0	1.9
2013–14	L.A. Lakers	18	0	12.7	.489	.579	.692	1.7	1.2	.7	.2	6.4
2017–18	Memphis	7	1	27.6	**.500**	**.594**	**.870**	3.1	**3.6**	**1.6**	**.4**	**20.1**
2018–19	Memphis	29	0	13.3	.450	.278	.697	1.6	.9	.3	.1	6.6
Career		200	50	17.3	.447	.345	.751	2.1	1.4	.6	.2	8.0

==== Playoffs ====
Year	Team	GP	GS	MPG	FG%	3P%	FT%	RPG	APG	SPG	BPG	PPG
2013	Brooklyn	7	0	5.7	.375	.000	1.000	.7	.4	.0	.0	1.1
Career		7	0	5.7	.375	.000	1.000	.7	.4	.0	.0	1.1
