= Kris Humphries =

American basketball player (born 1985)

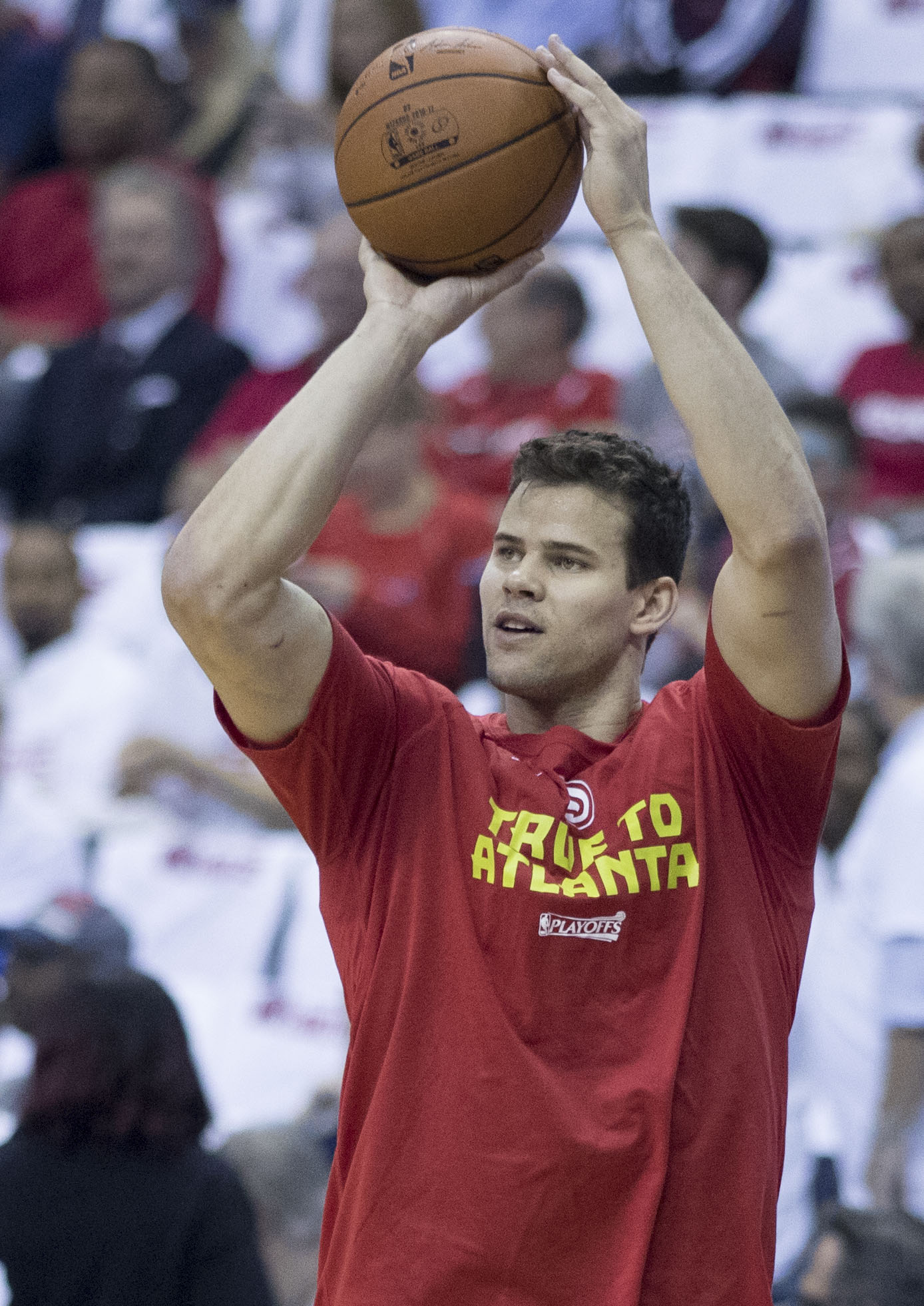
- Humphries with the Atlanta Hawks in 2017

Personal information
- Born: February 6, 1985 (age 41) Minneapolis, Minnesota, U.S.
- Listed height: 6 ft 9 in (206 cm)
- Listed weight: 235 lb (107 kg)

Career information
- High school: Hopkins (Minnetonka, Minnesota)
- College: Minnesota (2003–2004)
- NBA draft: 2004: 1st round, 14th overall pick
- Drafted by: Utah Jazz
- Playing career: 2004–2017
- Position: Power forward
- Number: 43

Career history
- 2004–2006: Utah Jazz
- 2006–2009: Toronto Raptors
- 2009–2010: Dallas Mavericks
- 2010–2013: New Jersey / Brooklyn Nets
- 2013–2014: Boston Celtics
- 2014–2016: Washington Wizards
- 2016: Phoenix Suns
- 2016–2017: Atlanta Hawks

Career highlights
- First-team All-Big Ten (2004); Big Ten Freshman of the Year (2004); McDonald's All-American (2003); First-team Parade All-American (2003); Minnesota Mr. Basketball (2003)

Career NBA statistics
- Points: 5,350 (6.7 ppg)
- Rebounds: 4,314 (5.4 rpg)
- Assists: 556 (0.7 apg)
- Stats at NBA.com
- Stats at Basketball Reference
Medals
Men's basketball
Representing the United States
FIBA Americas U18 Championship
Bronze medal – third place	2002 Isla Margarita	National team

Kristopher Nathan Humphries (born February 6, 1985) is an American former professional basketball power forward who played in the National Basketball Association (NBA). He played in the NBA for the Utah Jazz, Toronto Raptors, Dallas Mavericks, New Jersey / Brooklyn Nets, Boston Celtics, Washington Wizards, Phoenix Suns, and the Atlanta Hawks from 2004 to 2016. Humphries played college basketball for the Minnesota Golden Gophers and for the United States men's national basketball team. He was married to Kim Kardashian for 72 days before they divorced.

== Early life ==
Humphries was born in Minnesota to Debra and William Humphries. His father was a football player at the University of Minnesota. Humphries is half-African American from his father. He has two older sisters, Krystal and Kaela. His first success in sports came in competitive swimming, where he was the top 10-year-old in the nation in six events, first, beating young Michael Phelps in the remaining events. Kris Humphries held the US national record for the 50-meter freestyle for 10 and under boys for 18 years until it was recently broken. At age 12, he gave up swimming to pursue a career in basketball.

Humphries attended Hopkins High School, where he led the team to a 25–2 record in 2002 and its first Minnesota state championship in 49 years. He was named a 2003 McDonald's All-American and named Second Team All-USA by USA Today. He was also named to the Super 25 Basketball Team by USA Today, named Minnesota Mr. Basketball, and state player of the year by the Minneapolis Star Tribune and College Basketball News. He was one of 10 finalists for the 2003 Naismith Prep Player of the Year Award, averaging a double-double in his final three seasons, averaging 25.7 points, 11.4 rebounds, and 5.0 assists a game as a senior.

Considered a five-star recruit by Rivals.com, Humphries was listed as the No. 2 power forward and the No. 15 player in the nation in 2003.

Humphries accepted a scholarship offer to Duke University, but later reconsidered and chose the University of Minnesota.

== College career ==
At Minnesota, Humphries was named 2004 Big Ten Freshman of the Year and named to the All-Big Ten First Team by the media and coaches. He was named Honorable Mention All-America by the Associated Press and by Rivals.com. He was the first freshman to lead the Big Ten in scoring and rebounding in the same season. He scored in double figures in all the 29 games, with 16 point/rebound double-doubles on the season for Minnesota. He averaged 21.7 points and 10.1 rebounds (both tops in the Big Ten), while shooting .444 percent from the field and .742 from the line. On February 18, 2004, he set a school record with 36 points in a game against Indiana. He also set a school record for most points by a freshman for a season with 629 and was the first Big Ten freshman to be named conference Player of the Week in two of the first three weeks of the season. Humphries only played one season for Minnesota before declaring for the NBA draft.

Although Humphries was personally successful at Minnesota, the team struggled. The Gophers finished 12–18, with a 3–13 record in the Big Ten during Humphries' lone season, tying Penn State for the worst record in the conference. Critics accused Humphries of playing selfishly, preferring to inflate his statistics and NBA draft stock rather than help the team win games. The team had a .500 record before his arrival and finished with a 10–6 conference record in the season after he left. At the 2004 NBA Combine, Humphries benched an impressive 22 reps of 185 pounds.

== Professional career ==
=== Utah Jazz (2004–2006) ===
Humphries was drafted by the Utah Jazz with the 14th overall selection in the 2004 NBA draft. He spent two seasons with the Jazz, averaging 3.7 ppg and 2.8 rpg in 4.8 minutes per game.

=== Toronto Raptors (2006–2009) ===
On June 8, 2006, Humphries was traded along with Robert Whaley to the Toronto Raptors in exchange for Rafael Araújo. In the 2006–07 season, after a slow start in which he did not receive many minutes from Raptors coach Sam Mitchell, Humphries proved to be a valuable rebounder and energy player and contributed to the Raptors capturing their first ever division title. On March 28, 2007, he grabbed seven offensive rebounds in 27 minutes against the Miami Heat, both a game-high and a career-high. He followed up this performance with nine offensive and 18 total rebounds in a win against the Detroit Pistons on April 13, 2007, again both game and career-highs. Humphries concluded his inaugural season with the Raptors with a career-high 3.1 rpg and .470 field goal percentage, as well as 3.8 ppg.

=== Dallas Mavericks (2009–2010) ===
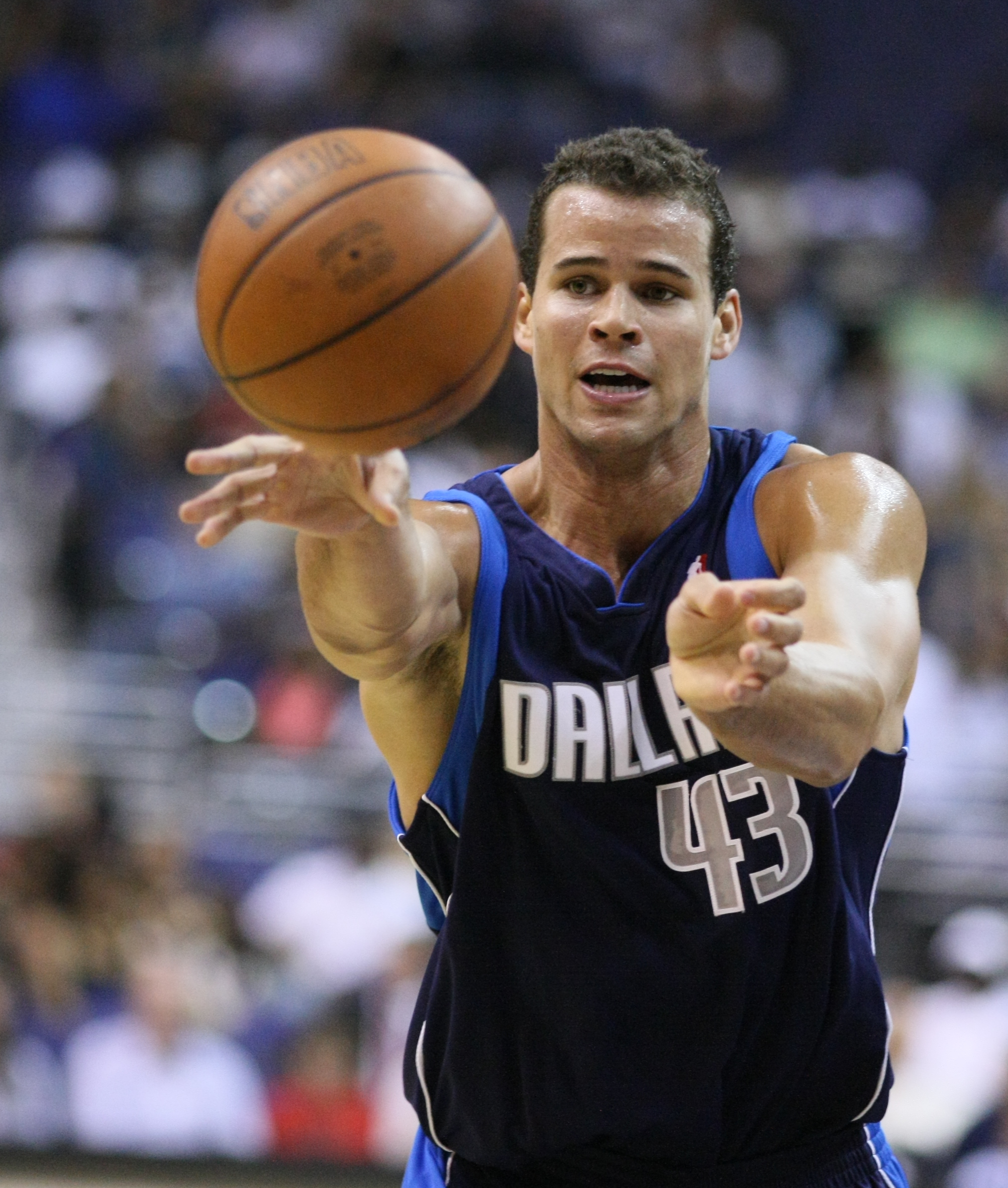
Humphries played with the Dallas Mavericks during the 2009–10 season.

On July 9, 2009, Humphries, Shawn Marion and Nathan Jawai were traded to the Dallas Mavericks as a part of the four-team deal among Raptors, Mavericks, Orlando Magic and Memphis Grizzlies.

=== New Jersey / Brooklyn Nets (2010–2013) ===
On January 11, 2010, the Mavericks traded Humphries along with G/F Shawne Williams to the New Jersey Nets in order to re-acquire Eduardo Nájera. On January 27, 2010, Humphries scored a career-high 25 points against the Los Angeles Clippers. He previously recorded career highs of 15 and 21 points respectively as a New Jersey Net. The 2011 season was a breakout season for Humphries as he averaged a double-double in points and rebounds. On December 21, 2011, Humphries signed a one-year, $8 million contract with the New Jersey Nets.

The 2011–12 season was his best as a professional, as he started all 62 games that he played in, averaging 13.8 points, 11.0 rebounds, and 1.2 blocked shots per game – all career highs. His rebounding average was good enough to rank fifth in the league for the second consecutive season.

On July 17, 2012, Humphries signed a two-year, $24 million contract with the Nets, who by that point had moved to Brooklyn.

=== Boston Celtics (2013–2014) ===
On June 27, 2013, ESPN.com reported that the Nets and Boston Celtics had worked out a trade that would send Humphries and four other players (Keith Bogans, MarShon Brooks, Kris Joseph, and Gerald Wallace) as well as three future first-round draft picks to Boston in exchange for Kevin Garnett, Paul Pierce, and Jason Terry as well as D. J. White. The deal was finally completed on July 12, 2013.

=== Washington Wizards (2014–2016) ===
On July 19, 2014, Humphries was acquired by the Washington Wizards in a sign-and-trade deal that sent a protected 2015 second round pick and a trade exception to the Boston Celtics. On October 9, 2014, he underwent successful surgery to repair nerve damage in his right small finger, and was subsequently sidelined for three to four weeks.

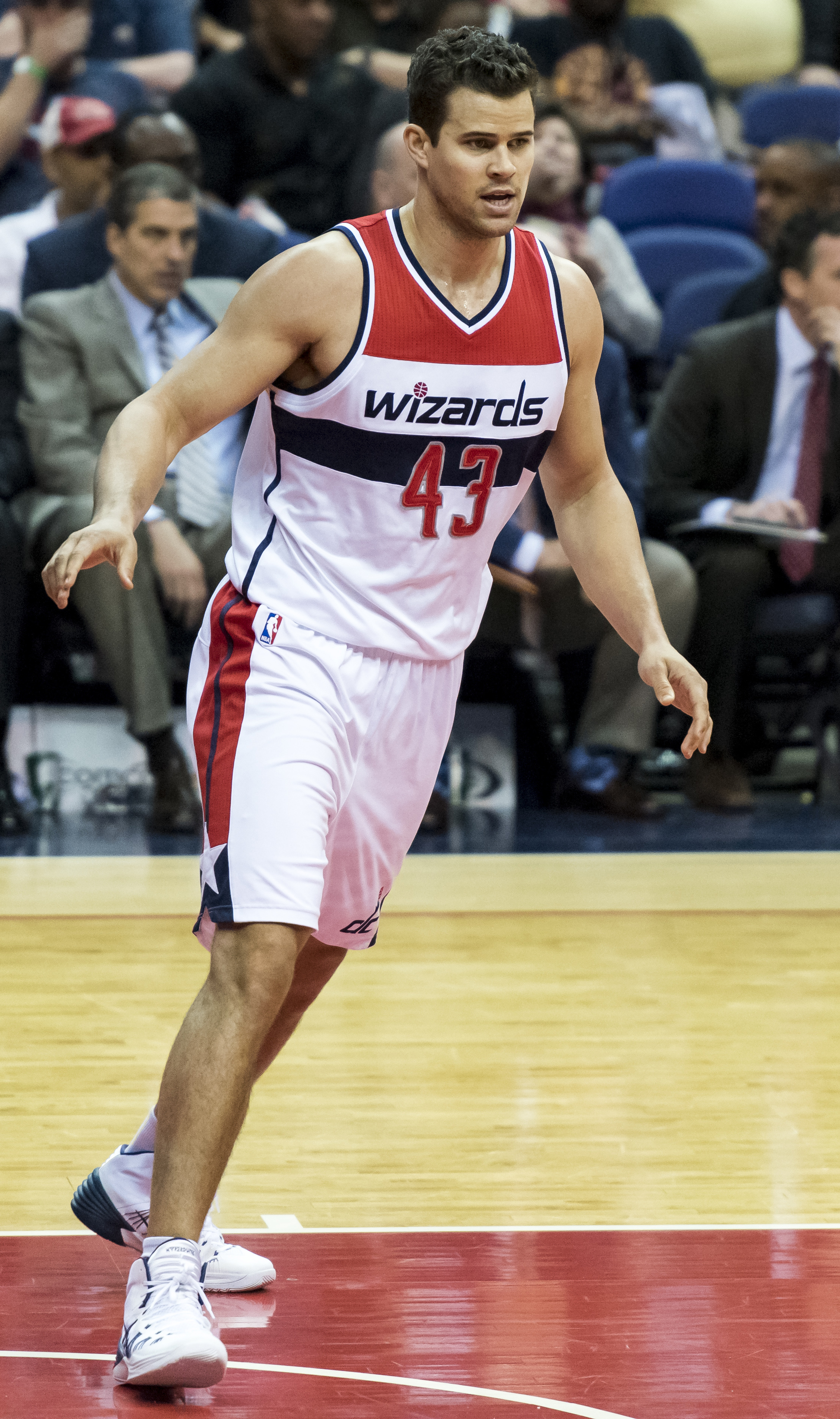
Humphries with the Washington Wizards in 2015

On November 14, 2015, Humphries made 5-of-8 three-pointers on his way to a game-high 23 points, helping the Wizards defeat the Orlando Magic 108–99. Prior to the 2015–16 season, Humphries had gone more than a decade since making a three-pointer. He hit two in his 2004–05 rookie season, and none after that, until this game.

=== Phoenix Suns (2016) ===
On February 18, 2016, Humphries was traded, along with DeJuan Blair and a 2016 protected first round draft pick, to the Phoenix Suns in exchange for Markieff Morris. He made his debut for the Suns the following day in a 116–100 loss to the Houston Rockets, recording 18 points and 12 rebounds in 27 minutes off the bench, becoming the 13th Suns player to have a double-double in his debut. On February 28, after three starts in four games, he was waived by the Suns in a buyout agreement.

=== Atlanta Hawks (2016–2017) ===
On March 1, 2016, Humphries signed with the Atlanta Hawks. Three days later, he made his debut for the Hawks in a 106–77 win over the Los Angeles Lakers, recording 14 points, eight rebounds, one steal and one block in 22 minutes off the bench.

On July 15, 2016, Humphries re-signed with the Hawks.

=== Retirement ===
On September 25, 2017, Humphries signed with the Philadelphia 76ers but was waived on October 14, 2017, as one of the final roster cuts. Humphries announced his retirement on March 26, 2019.

== National team career ==
Humphries was on the 2002 U.S. Junior World Championship Qualifying Tournament Team, alongside future Raptors teammate Chris Bosh. The team finished with a 4–1 record and the bronze medal and qualified for a berth in the 2003 FIBA Junior World Championship. Humphries averaged 9.0 points and 5.0 rebounds in five games.

== Personal life ==
Humphries began dating reality TV personality Kim Kardashian in October 2010. They became engaged in May 2011, and married on August 20, 2011. A two-part TV special showing the preparations and the wedding itself aired on E! in early October 2011, amidst what The Washington Post called a "media blitz" related to the wedding.

On October 31, 2011, it was announced that Kardashian had filed for divorce from Humphries after 72 days of marriage.

On December 1, 2011, Humphries filed his response to Kardashian's petition, requesting an annulment on the grounds of fraud or a decree of legal separation rather than the Kardashian-requested divorce.

Several media outlets at that time reported that Kardashian's marriage to Humphries was a publicity stunt orchestrated by E! Entertainment, Kris Jenner, and Kim Kardashian to promote the Kardashian family's brand and their subsequent television ventures; however, there was never any substantial evidence to support that claim.

In April 2013, after a lengthy legal battle, Humphries and Kardashian reached a divorce settlement. Their divorce was finalized on June 3, 2013.

== Career statistics ==
Legend
GP	Games played	GS	Games started	MPG	Minutes per game
FG%	Field goal percentage	3P%	3-point field goal percentage	FT%	Free throw percentage
RPG	Rebounds per game	APG	Assists per game	SPG	Steals per game
BPG	Blocks per game	PPG	Points per game	**Bold**	Career high

=== College ===
Year	Team	GP	GS	MPG	FG%	3P%	FT%	RPG	APG	SPG	BPG	PPG
2003–04	Minnesota	29	28	34.1	.444	.340	.742	10.1	.7	.9	1.1	21.7

=== NBA ===
==== Regular season ====
Year	Team	GP	GS	MPG	FG%	3P%	FT%	RPG	APG	SPG	BPG	PPG
2004–05	Utah	67	4	13.0	.404	.333	.436	2.9	.6	.4	.3	4.1
2005–06	Utah	62	2	10.0	.379	.000	.523	2.5	.5	.4	.3	3.0
2006–07	Toronto	60	2	11.2	.470	.000	.671	3.1	.3	.2	.4	3.8
2007–08	Toronto	70	0	13.2	.483	.000	.605	3.7	.4	.4	.4	5.7
2008–09	Toronto	29	0	9.1	.422	.000	.792	2.4	.3	.3	.2	3.9
2009–10	Dallas	25	0	12.6	.461	.000	.568	3.8	.3	.3	.4	5.2
2009–10	New Jersey	44	0	20.6	.433	.000	.699	6.4	.6	.7	.8	8.1
2010–11	New Jersey	**74**	44	27.9	**.527**	.000	.665	10.4	1.1	.4	1.1	10.0
2011–12	New Jersey	62	**62**	**34.9**	.481	.000	.752	**11.0**	1.5	**.8**	**1.2**	**13.8**
2012–13	Brooklyn	65	21	18.3	.448	.000	.789	5.6	.5	.2	.5	5.8
2013–14	Boston	46	10	19.9	.501	.000	.866	5.7	1.0	.4	.9	7.6
2014–15	Washington	64	17	21.0	.473	.000	.744	6.5	.9	.5	.4	8.0
2015–16	Washington	28	14	16.6	.405	.343	**.935**	4.1	.6	.1	.5	6.4
2015–16	Phoenix	4	3	18.5	.278	.300	.750	8.0	**1.8**	**.8**	.5	7.3
2015–16	Atlanta	21	0	14.0	.465	.258	.711	3.4	.6	.5	.3	6.4
2016–17	Atlanta	56	4	12.3	.407	**.352**	.780	3.7	.5	.3	.4	4.6
Career		800	203	17.8	.463	.293	.700	5.4	.7	.4	.6	6.7

==== Playoffs ====
Year	Team	GP	GS	MPG	FG%	3P%	FT%	RPG	APG	SPG	BPG	PPG
2007	Toronto	6	0	11.5	.333	.000	.375	2.8	.2	.2	.3	1.5
2008	Toronto	3	0	0.7	.000	.000	.000	.0	.0	.0	.0	.0
2013	Brooklyn	**7**	0	11.9	.452	.000	.429	3.3	.1	.1	.4	4.4
2015	Washington	1	0	5.0	**1.000**	.000	.000	3.0	.0	.0	.0	2.0
2016	Atlanta	4	0	**14.0**	.464	**.500**	**1.000**	**6.0**	**1.0**	**.5**	**1.3**	**9.3**
2017	Atlanta	1	0	3.0	.000	.000	.000	0.0	.0	.0	1.0	0.0
Career		22	0	9.9	.449	.500	.571	3.0	.3	.2	.5	3.6
