= 2013–14 Boston Celtics season =

Season of National Basketball Association team the Boston Celtics

- Head coach: Brad Stevens
- General manager: Danny Ainge
- Owners: Boston Basketball Partners
- Arena: TD Garden

Results
- Record: 25–57 (.305)
- Place: Division: 4th (Atlantic); Conference: 12th (Eastern)
- Playoff finish: Did not qualify
- Stats at Basketball Reference

Local media
- Television: Comcast SportsNet New England
- Radio: WBZ-FM

The 2013–14 Boston Celtics season was the franchise's 68th season in the National Basketball Association (NBA). The Celtics made several major changes to the team, including hiring Brad Stevens as the new head coach and sending Kevin Garnett, Paul Pierce, and Jason Terry to the Brooklyn Nets. The Celtics finished 25–57 and failed to qualify for the playoffs for the first time since 2007. As of 2026, this is the most recent season in which the Celtics missed the playoffs.

== Key dates ==
- June 3: Head Coach Doc Rivers allowed out of his contract to coach Los Angeles Clippers and the Celtics were given a 2015 unprotected first-round pick as compensation.
- June 27: The 2013 NBA draft took place at the Barclays Center in Brooklyn, New York.
- July 1: 2013 NBA Free Agency begins.
- July 3: Brad Stevens hired as new head coach.
- July 12: Paul Pierce, Kevin Garnett, and Jason Terry traded to the Brooklyn Nets.
- January 17: Rajon Rondo returned from ACL injury and was named the 15th Team Captain in team history.

== Draft picks ==
Round	Pick	Player	Position	Nationality	Team
1	16	Lucas Nogueira	C	(Brazil) Brazilian	Estudiantes (Spain)

== Roster ==
2013–14 Boston Celtics roster
Players

Pos.	No.	Player	Height	Weight	DOB	From
C	50	Joel Anthony	6 ft 9 in (2.06 m)	245 lb (111 kg)	1982-08-09	UNLV
G	52	Chris Babb	6 ft 5 in (1.96 m)	225 lb (102 kg)	1990-02-14	Iowa State
F	30	Brandon Bass	6 ft 8 in (2.03 m)	250 lb (113 kg)	1985-04-30	LSU
G	11	Jerryd Bayless	6 ft 3 in (1.91 m)	200 lb (91 kg)	1988-08-20	Arizona
G/F	4	Keith Bogans	6 ft 5 in (1.96 m)	215 lb (98 kg)	1980-05-12	Kentucky
G	0	Avery Bradley	6 ft 2 in (1.88 m)	180 lb (82 kg)	1990-11-26	Texas
F/C	38	Vítor Faverani	6 ft 11 in (2.11 m)	260 lb (118 kg)	1988-05-05	Brazil
F	8	Jeff Green	6 ft 9 in (2.06 m)	235 lb (107 kg)	1986-08-28	Georgetown
F/C	43	Kris Humphries	6 ft 9 in (2.06 m)	235 lb (107 kg)	1985-02-06	Minnesota
G/F	12	Chris Johnson	6 ft 6 in (1.98 m)	201 lb (91 kg)	1990-04-29	Dayton
F/C	41	Kelly Olynyk	7 ft 0 in (2.13 m)	238 lb (108 kg)	1991-04-19	Gonzaga
G	26	Phil Pressey	5 ft 11 in (1.80 m)	175 lb (79 kg)	1991-02-17	Missouri
G	9	Rajon Rondo	6 ft 1 in (1.85 m)	186 lb (84 kg)	1986-02-22	Kentucky
F	7	Jared Sullinger	6 ft 9 in (2.06 m)	260 lb (118 kg)	1992-03-04	Ohio State
F	45	Gerald Wallace	6 ft 7 in (2.01 m)	220 lb (100 kg)	1982-07-23	Alabama

Coaches
Head coach
- Brad Stevens
Assistant(s)
- Ron Adams
- Jamie Young
- Jay Larranaga
- Micah Shrewsberry
- Walter McCarty

Legend
- (DP) Unsigned draft pick
- (FA) Free agent
- (S) Suspended
- (DL) On assignment to D-League affiliate
- Injured

Roster
Updated: 2014–03–21

== Pre-season ==
2013 pre-season game log
Total: 2–6 (Home: 2–2; Road: 0–4)
Pre-season: 2–6 (home: 2–2; road: 0–4)

Game	Date	Team	Score	High points	High rebounds	High assists	Location Attendance	Record
1	October 7	Toronto	L 89–97	Gerald Wallace (16)	Jared Sullinger (6)	Kelly Olynyk (5)	TD Garden; 16,424	0–1
2	October 9	New York	L 102–103	Phil Pressey (13)	Sullinger & Faverani (6)	Phil Pressey (7)	Dunkin' Donuts Center; 10,404	0–2
3	October 11	@ Philadelphia	L 85–97	Jared Sullinger (19)	Brandon Bass (10)	Phil Pressey (5)	Bob Carpenter Center; 4,646	0–3
4	October 12	New York	W 111–81	Kelly Olynyk (15)	Bass & Crawford (7)	Green, Crawford, Olynyk, & Lee (3)	Verizon Wireless Arena; 9,391	1–3
5	October 15	@ Brooklyn	L 80–82	Courtney Lee (14)	Avery Bradley (9)	Jordan Crawford (6)	Barclays Center; 15,554	1–4
6	October 16	@ Toronto	L 97–99	MarShon Brooks (17)	Kelly Olynyk (9)	Lee & Pressey (5)	Air Canada Centre; 13,331	1–5
7	October 20	@ Minnesota	L 89–104	Gerald Wallace (16)	Brandon Bass (8)	Wallace & Bradley (3)	Bell Centre; 20,152	1–6
8	October 23	Brooklyn	W 101–97	Bradley & Bass (16)	Brandon Bass (9)	Gerald Wallace (5)	TD Garden; 15,865	2–6

2013–14 season schedule

== Regular season ==
=== Season standings ===
Atlantic Division	W	L	PCT	GB	Home	Road	Div	GP
y-Toronto Raptors	48	34	.585	–	26‍–‍15	22‍–‍19	11–5	82
x-Brooklyn Nets	44	38	.537	4.0	28‍–‍13	16‍–‍25	9–7	82
New York Knicks	37	45	.451	11.0	19‍–‍22	18‍–‍23	10–6	82
Boston Celtics	25	57	.305	23.0	16‍–‍25	9‍–‍32	5–11	82
Philadelphia 76ers	19	63	.232	29.0	10‍–‍31	9‍–‍32	5–11	82

Eastern Conference
#	Team	W	L	PCT	GB	GP
1	c-Indiana Pacers *	56	26	.683	–	82
2	y-Miami Heat *	54	28	.659	2.0	82
3	y-Toronto Raptors *	48	34	.585	8.0	82
4	x-Chicago Bulls	48	34	.585	8.0	82
5	x-Washington Wizards	44	38	.537	12.0	82
6	x-Brooklyn Nets	44	38	.537	12.0	82
7	x-Charlotte Bobcats	43	39	.524	13.0	82
8	x-Atlanta Hawks	38	44	.463	18.0	82
9	New York Knicks	37	45	.451	19.0	82
10	Cleveland Cavaliers	33	49	.402	23.0	82
11	Detroit Pistons	29	53	.354	27.0	82
12	Boston Celtics	25	57	.305	31.0	82
13	Orlando Magic	23	59	.280	33.0	82
14	Philadelphia 76ers	19	63	.232	37.0	82
15	Milwaukee Bucks	15	67	.183	41.0	82

=== Game log ===
2013–14 game log
Total: 25–57 (Home: 16–25; Road: 9–32)
October: 0–1 (home: 0–0; road: 0–1)

Game	Date	Team	Score	High points	High rebounds	High assists	Location Attendance	Record
1	October 30	@ Toronto	L 87–93	Jeff Green (25)	Kris Humphries (9)	Jordan Crawford (5)	Air Canada Centre; 20,155	0–1

November : 7–11 (home: 3–5; road: 4–6)

Game	Date	Team	Score	High points	High rebounds	High assists	Location Attendance	Record
2	November 1	Milwaukee	L 98–105	Brandon Bass (17)	Vítor Faverani (18)	Gerald Wallace (4)	TD Garden; 18,624	0–2
3	November 3	@ Detroit	L 77–87	Kelly Olynyk (15)	Bass, Bradley, Olynyk (8)	Bass & Bradley (3)	Palace of Auburn Hills; 14,978	0–3
4	November 4	@ Memphis	L 88–95	Jeff Green (22)	Vítor Faverani (6)	Jordan Crawford (4)	FedExForum; 15,872	0–4
5	November 6	Utah	W 97–87	Brandon Bass (20)	Gerald Wallace (9)	Green & Crawford (4)	TD Garden; 17,130	1–4
6	November 8	@ Orlando	W 91–89	Brandon Bass (16)	Avery Bradley (8)	Jordan Crawford (5)	Amway Center; 17,555	2–4
7	November 9	@ Miami	W 111–110	Jeff Green (24)	Olynyk & Sullinger (8)	Gerald Wallace (7)	American Airlines Arena; 19,710	3–4
8	November 11	Orlando	W 120–105	Avery Bradley (24)	Kelly Olynyk (7)	Jordan Crawford (10)	TD Garden; 18,624	4–4
9	November 13	Charlotte	L 83–89	Jeff Green (19)	Kelly Olynyk (11)	Jordan Crawford (6)	TD Garden; 17,032	4–5
10	November 15	Portland	L 96–109	Jared Sullinger (26)	Jared Sullinger (8)	Jordan Crawford (5)	TD Garden; 18,624	4–6
11	November 16	@ Minnesota	L 88–106	Avery Bradley (27)	Vítor Faverani (14)	Jordan Crawford (5)	Target Center; 15,111	4–7
12	November 19	@ Houston	L 85–109	Courtney Lee (17)	Jared Sullinger (9)	Phil Pressey (5)	Toyota Center; 18,232	4–8
13	November 20	@ San Antonio	L 93–104	Jeff Green (19)	Jared Sullinger (17)	Jordan Crawford (4)	AT&T Center; 18,581	4–9
14	November 22	Indiana	L 82–97	Jordan Crawford (24)	Avery Bradley (7)	Jordan Crawford (4)	TD Garden; 18,624	4–10
15	November 23	@ Atlanta	W 94–87	Brandon Bass (17)	Jared Sullinger (9)	Jordan Crawford (10)	Philips Arena; 15,189	5–10
16	November 25	@ Charlotte	W 96–86	Jordan Crawford (21)	Jared Sullinger (8)	Phil Pressey (8)	Time Warner Cable Arena; 13,558	6–10
17	November 27	Memphis	L 93–100	Jeff Green (26)	Brandon Bass (13)	Jordan Crawford (7)	TD Garden; 17,319	6–11
18	November 29	Cleveland	W 103–86	Jeff Green (31)	Jordan Crawford (11)	Jordan Crawford (10)	TD Garden; 17,685	7–11
19	November 30	@ Milwaukee	L 85–92	Jared Sullinger (21)	Jared Sullinger (14)	Jeff Green (6)	BMO Harris Bradley Center; 15,471	7–12

December: 6–6 (home: 5–4; road: 1–2)

Game	Date	Team	Score	High points	High rebounds	High assists	Location Attendance	Record
20	December 3	Milwaukee	W 108–100	Jordan Crawford (25)	Brandon Bass (9)	Jordan Crawford (5)	TD Garden; 16,649	8–12
21	December 6	Denver	W 106–98	Jordan Crawford (22)	Brandon Bass (8)	Jordan Crawford (8)	TD Garden; 17,263	9–12
22	December 8	@ New York	W 114–73	Jordan Crawford (23)	Avery Bradley (10)	Jordan Crawford (7)	Madison Square Garden; 19,812	10–12
23	December 10	@ Brooklyn	L 96–104	Avery Bradley (22)	Brandon Bass (11)	Jordan Crawford (4)	Barclays Center; 15,738	10–13
24	December 11	L.A. Clippers	L 88–96	Jeff Green (28)	Brandon Bass (12)	Jordan Crawford (9)	TD Garden; 17,587	10–14
25	December 13	New York	W 90–86	Jared Sullinger (19)	Brandon Bass (8)	Jordan Crawford (6)	TD Garden; 17,479	11–14
26	December 16	Minnesota	W 101–97	Jared Sullinger (24)	Jared Sullinger (11)	Jared Sullinger (5)	TD Garden; 17,071	12–14
27	December 18	Detroit	L 106–107	Jared Sullinger (19)	Jared Sullinger (8)	Jordan Crawford (6)	TD Garden; 17,101	12–15
28	December 21	Washington	L 99–106	Avery Bradley (26)	Sullinger, Bass (11)	Jordan Crawford (8)	TD Garden; 18,169	12–16
29	December 22	@ Indiana	L 79–106	Avery Bradley (13)	Jeff Green (6)	Kelly Olynyk (4)	Bankers Life Fieldhouse; 18,165	12–17
30	December 28	Cleveland	W 103–100	Crawford, Green (19)	Bradley, Green (8)	Crawford (5)	TD Garden; 18,624	13–17
31	December 31	Atlanta	L 91–92	Kelly Olynyk (21)	Sullinger, Humphries (10)	Jordan Crawford (5)	TD Garden; 18,624	13–18

January : 2–15 (home: 1–6; road: 1–9)

Game	Date	Team	Score	High points	High rebounds	High assists	Location Attendance	Record
32	January 2	@ Chicago	L 82–94	Jordan Crawford (22)	Sullinger, Humphries (11)	Jordan Crawford (7)	United Center; 21,721	13–19
33	January 3	New Orleans	L 92–95	Avery Bradley (22)	Kris Humphries (12)	Jordan Crawford (11)	TD Garden; 18,624	13–20
34	January 5	@ Oklahoma City	L 96–119	Green, Bradley (19)	Sullinger, Olynyk (8)	Jordan Crawford (7)	Chesapeake Energy Arena; 18,203	13–21
35	January 7	@ Denver	L 98–129	Jeff Green (17)	Bass, Sullinger (7)	Jordan Crawford (5)	Pepsi Center; 16,224	13–22
36	January 8	@ L.A. Clippers	L 105–111	Crawford, Bradley (24)	Green (11)	Jordan Crawford (8)	Staples Center; 19,214	13–23
37	January 10	@ Golden State	L 97–99	Jeff Green (24)	Kris Humphries (14)	Jordan Crawford (7)	Oracle Arena; 19,596	13–24
38	January 11	@ Portland	L 104–112	Avery Bradley (25)	Jared Sullinger (10)	Crawford, Bayless (6)	Moda Center; 20,011	13–25
39	January 13	Houston	L 92–104	Avery Bradley (24)	Jared Sullinger (10)	Jordan Crawford (5)	TD Garden; 17,750	13–26
40	January 15	Toronto	W 88–83	Jared Sullinger (25)	Jared Sullinger (20)	Phil Pressey (10)	TD Garden; 17,569	14–26
41	January 17	L.A. Lakers	L 104–107	Kelly Olynyk (25)	Jeff Green (9)	Phil Pressey (9)	TD Garden; 18,624	14–27
42	January 19	@ Orlando	L 91–93	Jeff Green (22)	Kris Humphries (12)	Phil Pressey (5)	Amway Center; 17,548	14–28
43	January 21	@ Miami	L 86–93	Brandon Bass (15)	Kris Humphries (13)	Rajon Rondo (5)	American Airlines Arena; 19,619	14–29
44	January 22	@ Washington	W 113–111 (OT)	Jeff Green (39)	Jared Sullinger (11)	Gerald Wallace (9)	Verizon Center; 14,492	15–29
45	January 24	Oklahoma City	L 83–101	Jeff Green (16)	5 players (4)	Rajon Rondo (8)	TD Garden; 18,624	15–30
46	January 26	Brooklyn	L 79–85	Brandon Bass (17)	Bass, Rondo (8)	Rajon Rondo (8)	TD Garden; 18,624	15–31
47	January 28	@ New York	L 88–114	Jeff Green (14)	Green, Olynyk (7)	Rajon Rondo (5)	Madison Square Garden; 19,812	15–32
48	January 29	Philadelphia	L 94–95	Jared Sullinger (24)	Jared Sullinger (17)	Chris Johnson (5)	TD Garden; 18,624	15–33

February : 5–6 (home: 3–2; road: 2–4)

Game	Date	Team	Score	High points	High rebounds	High assists	Location Attendance	Record
49	February 2	Orlando	W 96–89	Jared Sullinger (21)	Jared Sullinger (12)	Rajon Rondo (10)	TD Garden; 18,624	16–33
50	February 5	@ Philadelphia	W 114–108	Jeff Green (36)	Jared Sullinger (10)	Rajon Rondo (11)	Wells Fargo Center; 10,267	17–33
51	February 7	Sacramento	W 99–89	Jared Sullinger (31)	Jared Sullinger (16)	Gerald Wallace (9)	TD Garden; 18,624	18–33
52	February 9	Dallas	L 91–102	Jeff Green (18)	Jared Sullinger (9)	Jared Sullinger (12)	TD Garden; 17,650	18–34
53	February 10	@ Milwaukee	W 102–86	Jeff Green (29)	Jared Sullinger (10)	Phil Pressey & Jerryd Bayless (6)	BMO Harris Bradley Center	19–34
54	February 12	San Antonio	L 92–104	Rajon Rondo (16)	Kelly Olynyk (10)	Jerryd Bayless (9)	TD Garden; 17,922	19–35
All-Star Break
55	February 19	@ Phoenix	L 94–100	Bass, Rondo (18)	Bass, Sullinger (8)	Rajon Rondo (10)	US Airways Center; 16,135	19–36
56	February 21	@ L.A. Lakers	L 92–101	Jeff Green (21)	Jared Sullinger (12)	Rajon Rondo (11)	Staples Center; 18,997	19–37
57	February 22	@ Sacramento	L 98–105	Jeff Green (29)	Kris Humphries (8)	Humphries, Bayless (4)	Sleep Train Arena; 17,317	19–38
58	February 24	@ Utah	L 98–110	Green, Olynyk (21)	Bass, Olynyk (8)	Rajon Rondo (10)	EnergySolutions Arena; 17,130	19–39
59	February 26	Atlanta	W 115–104	Jerryd Bayless (29)	Gerald Wallace (10)	Rajon Rondo (11)	TD Garden; 16,605	20–39

March : 3–12 (home: 3–6; road: 0–6)

Game	Date	Team	Score	High points	High rebounds	High assists	Location Attendance	Record
60	March 1	Indiana	L 97–102	Jeff Green (27)	Kris Humphries (10)	Rajon Rondo (11)	TD Garden; 18,624	20–40
61	March 5	Golden State	L 88–108	Kelly Olynyk (19)	Brandon Bass (8)	Rajon Rondo (7)	TD Garden; 18,155	20–41
62	March 7	Brooklyn	W 91–84	Rajon Rondo (20)	Jared Sullinger (12)	Rajon Rondo (9)	TD Garden; 18,195	21–41
63	March 9	Detroit	W 118–111	Jeff Green (27)	Kris Humphries (11)	Rajon Rondo (18)	TD Garden; 18,624	22–41
64	March 11	@ Indiana	L 83–94	Jared Sullinger (17)	Sullinger, Humphries (9)	Rajon Rondo (8)	Bankers Life Fieldhouse; 18,165	22–42
65	March 12	New York	L 92–116	Jeff Green (27)	Jared Sullinger (8)	Phil Pressey (5)	TD Garden; 18,624	22–43
66	March 14	Phoenix	L 80–87	Humphries, Johnson (11)	Kris Humphries (13)	Rondo, Pressey (5)	TD Garden; 18,624	22–44
67	March 16	@ New Orleans	L 120–121 (OT)	Jeff Green (39)	Kris Humphries (12)	Rajon Rondo (14)	Smoothie King Center; 17,050	22–45
68	March 17	@ Dallas	L 89–94	Jerryd Bayless (19)	Kris Humphries (14)	Jerryd Bayless (6)	American Airlines Center; 20,132	22–46
69	March 19	Miami	W 101–96	Avery Bradley (23)	Rajon Rondo (10)	Rajon Rondo (15)	TD Garden; 18,624	23–46
70	March 21	@ Brooklyn	L 98–114	Avery Bradley (28)	Kris Humphries (8)	Rajon Rondo (12)	Barclays Center; 17,732	23–47
71	March 26	Toronto	L 90–99	Jared Sullinger (26)	Jared Sullinger (8)	Rajon Rondo (15)	TD Garden; 18,341	23–48
72	March 28	@ Toronto	L 103–105	Jerryd Bayless (20)	Jared Sullinger (9)	Rajon Rondo (8)	Air Canada Centre; 19,800	23–49
73	March 30	Chicago	L 102–107	Rajon Rondo (17)	Jared Sullinger (10)	Rajon Rondo (11)	TD Garden; 18,624	23–50
74	March 31	@ Chicago	L 80–94	Bass, Bayless (18)	Brandon Bass (9)	Jerryd Bayless (5)	United Center; 21,494	23–51

April : 2–6 (home: 1–2; road: 1–4)

Game	Date	Team	Score	High points	High rebounds	High assists	Location Attendance	Record
75	April 2	@ Washington	L 92–118	Jared Sullinger (27)	Christapher Johnson (8)	Pressey, Rondo (6)	Verizon Center; 17,770	23–52
76	April 4	Philadelphia	L 102–111	Jerryd Bayless (23)	Bass, Rondo (11)	Rajon Rondo (16)	TD Garden; 18,624	23–53
77	April 5	@ Detroit	L 111–115	Jerryd Bayless (25)	Jared Sullinger (10)	Phil Pressey (11)	Palace of Auburn Hills; 19,558	23–54
78	April 9	@ Atlanta	L 97–105	Avery Bradley (24)	Jared Sullinger (11)	Rajon Rondo (12)	Philips Arena; 13,868	23–55
79	April 11	Charlotte	W 106–103	Avery Bradley (22)	Brandon Bass (9)	Phil Pressey (13)	TD Garden; 18,624	24–55
80	April 12	@ Cleveland	W 111–99	Olynyk, Bradley (25)	Kelly Olynyk (12)	Phil Pressey (13)	Quicken Loans Arena; 18,456	25–55
81	April 14	@ Philadelphia	L 108–113	Kelly Olynyk (28)	Rajon Rondo (11)	Rajon Rondo (14)	Wells Fargo Center; 17,822	25–56
82	April 16	Washington	L 102–118	Kelly Olynyk (24)	Olynyk, Bass (7)	Phil Pressey (10)	TD Garden; 18,624	25–57

2013–14 season schedule

== Player statistics ==
Legend
GP	Games played	GS	Games started	MPG	Minutes per game
FG%	Field-goal percentage	3P%	3-point field-goal percentage	FT%	Free-throw percentage
RPG	Rebounds per game	APG	Assists per game	SPG	Steals per game
BPG	Blocks per game	PPG	Points per game

Boston Celtics statistics
Player	GP	GS	MPG	FG%	3P%	FT%	RPG	APG	SPG	BPG	PPG
Joel Anthony ^{[1]}	21	0	7.1	.385		.333	1.5	.1	.1	.4	1.0
Chris Babb	14	0	9.4	.267	.222		1.2	.2	.4	.0	1.6
Brandon Bass	82	73	27.6	.486	.333	.858	5.7	1.1	.4	.9	11.1
Jerryd Bayless ^{[1]}	41	14	25.3	.418	.395	.803	2.1	3.1	1.0	.1	10.1
Vander Blue	3	0	5.0	.500	.000	.200	1.0	.3	.0	.0	1.7
Keith Bogans	6	0	9.2	.500	.500	1.000	.5	.5	.2	.0	2.0
Avery Bradley	60	58	30.9	.438	.395	.804	3.8	1.4	1.1	.2	14.9
MarShon Brooks ^{[1]}	10	0	7.3	.375	.500	.786	1.9	.4	.1	.1	3.1
Jordan Crawford ^{[1]}	39	35	30.7	.413	.318	.873	3.1	5.7	.9	.1	13.7
Vítor Faverani	37	8	13.2	.435	.300	.649	3.5	.4	.4	.7	4.4
Jeff Green	82	82	34.2	.412	.341	.795	4.6	1.7	.7	.6	16.9
Kris Humphries	69	30	19.9	.501	.000	.813	5.9	1.0	.4	.9	8.4
Chris Johnson	40	0	19.7	.397	.339	.860	2.4	.8	.7	.1	6.3
Courtney Lee ^{[1]}	30	0	16.8	.492	.442	.818	1.6	1.1	.7	.3	7.4
Kelly Olynyk	70	9	20.0	.466	.351	.811	5.2	1.6	.5	.4	8.7
Phil Pressey	75	11	15.1	.308	.264	.644	1.4	3.2	.9	.1	2.8
Rajon Rondo	30	30	33.3	.403	.289	.627	5.5	9.8	1.3	.1	11.7
Jared Sullinger	74	44	27.6	.427	.269	.778	8.1	1.6	.5	.7	13.3
Gerald Wallace	58	16	24.4	.504	.297	.465	3.7	2.5	1.3	.2	5.1

- ^{1} Statistics with the Boston Celtics.

== Awards ==
- Kelly Olynyk was selected to the NBA All-Rookie Second Team at the end of the season.
- Jordan Crawford was named Eastern Conference Player of the Week for games played from December 2 through December 8.
- Jared Sullinger was named Eastern Conference Player of the Week for games played from February 3 through February 9.

== Transactions ==
=== Overview ===
Players Added

Via draft

- Kelly Olynyk

Via free agency

- Vítor Faverani
- Phil Pressey

Via trade

- Keith Bogans
- MarShon Brooks
- Donté Greene
- Kris Joseph
- Kris Humphries
- Gerald Wallace
Players Lost

Via free agency

- Chris Wilcox

Via trade

- Kevin Garnett
- Fab Melo
- Paul Pierce
- Jason Terry
- D.J. White

Waived

- Kris Joseph
- Shavlik Randolph
- Terrence Williams
- Donté Greene

=== Trades ===
June 3, 2013	To Boston Celtics 2015 first-round unprotected draft pick	To Los Angeles Clippers Rights to hire Doc Rivers as head coach

June 27, 2013	To Boston Celtics Draft rights to 13th pick Kelly Olynyk	To Dallas Mavericks Draft rights to 16th pick Lucas Nogueira, Two future second-round draft picks

July 12, 2013	To Boston Celtics Keith Bogans (sign and trade), MarShon Brooks, Kris Joseph, Kris Humphries, Gerald Wallace, 2014, 2016 and 2018 first-round draft picks (option of swapping 2018 pick with Brooklyn's 2017 pick), 2014 trade exception	To Brooklyn Nets Kevin Garnett, Paul Pierce, Jason Terry, D.J. White

August 15, 2013	To Boston Celtics Donté Greene	To Memphis Grizzlies Fab Melo, Cash considerations

January 7, 2014	To Boston Celtics Jerryd Bayless (from Memphis), Ryan Gomes (from Oklahoma City)	To Memphis Grizzlies Courtney Lee (from Boston), 2016 second-round pick (from Boston), Cash considerations (from Oklahoma City)	To Oklahoma City Thunder Conditional 2014 second-round pick (from Memphis), Conditional 2017 second-round pick (from Memphis)

January 15, 2014	To Boston Celtics Joel Anthony (from Miami), 2016 second-round pick (from Miami), Conditional first-round pick (from Philadelphia via Golden State)	To Miami Heat Toney Douglas (from Golden State)	To Golden State Warriors Jordan Crawford (from Boston), MarShon Brooks (from Boston)
