= Mehmet Okur =

Turkish basketball player (born 1979)

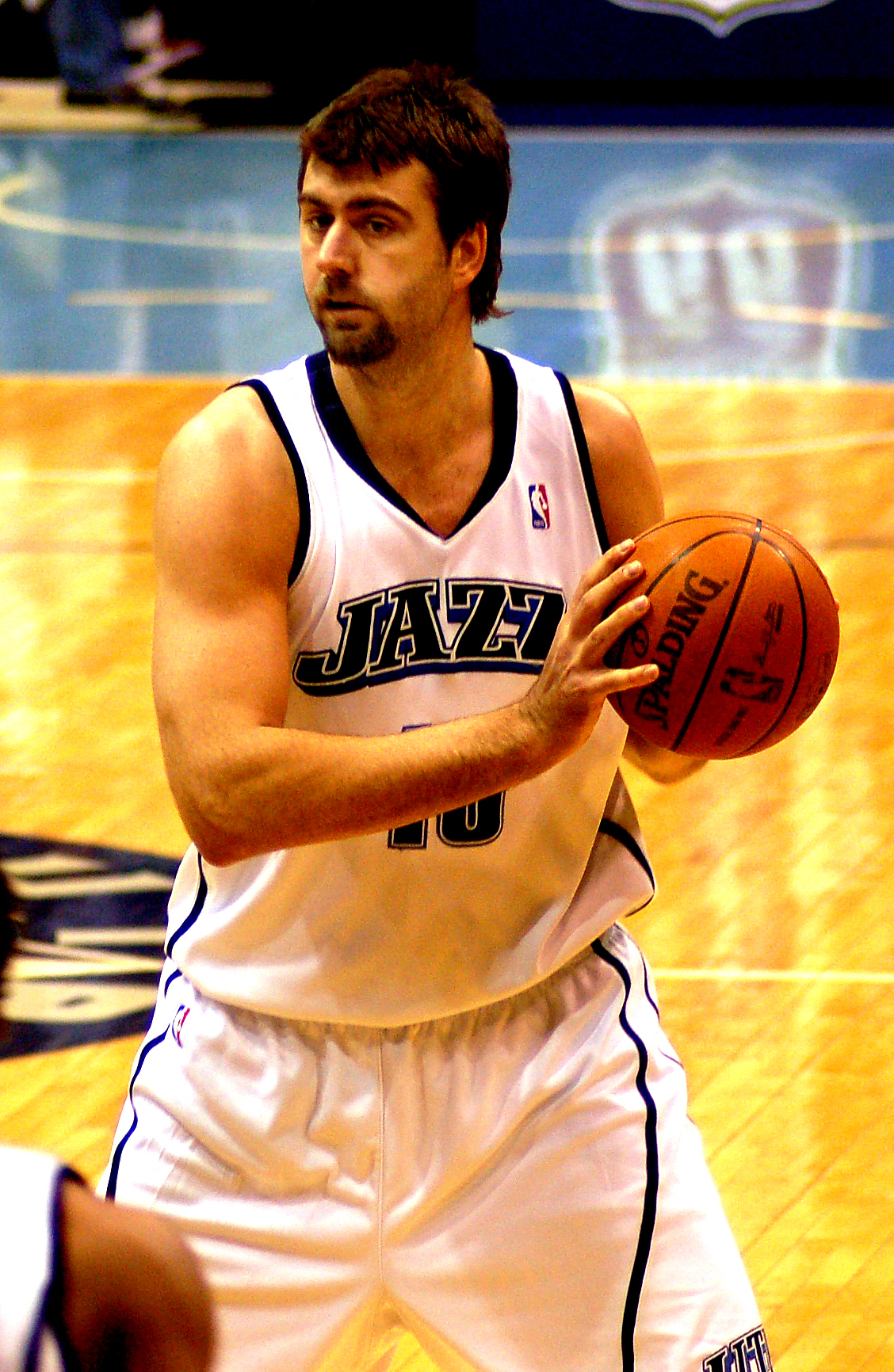
- Okur with the Utah Jazz in 2010

Personal information
- Born: 26 May 1979 (age 47) Yalova, Turkey
- Listed height: 6 ft 11 in (2.11 m)
- Listed weight: 249 lb (113 kg)

Career information
- NBA draft: 2001: 2nd round, 38th overall pick
- Drafted by: Detroit Pistons
- Playing career: 1997–2012
- Position: Center / power forward
- Number: 13
- Coaching career: 2016–2017

Career history

Playing
- 1997–1998: Oyak Renault
- 1998–2000: Tofaş
- 2000–2002: Efes Pilsen
- 2002–2004: Detroit Pistons
- 2004–2011: Utah Jazz
- 2011: Türk Telekom
- 2011–2012: New Jersey Nets

Coaching
- 2016–2017: Phoenix Suns (player development)

Career highlights
- NBA champion (2004); NBA All-Star (2007); 3× Turkish League Champion (1999, 2000, 2002); 4× Turkish Cup Champion (1999–2002); 2× Turkish Presidential Cup Champion (1999, 2000)

Career NBA statistics
- Points: 8,561 (13.5 ppg)
- Rebounds: 4,436 (7.0 rpg)
- Assists: 1,089 (1.7 apg)
- Stats at NBA.com
- Stats at Basketball Reference
Medals
Men's basketball
Representing Turkey
FIBA European Championship
Silver medal – second place	2001 Turkey	Team

Mehmet Murat Okur (born 26 May 1979) is a Turkish former professional basketball player. Listed at 6 ft 11 in (2.11 m), he played as a power forward and center.

Okur is known for his three-point shooting and ability to space the floor. In his seven seasons with the Utah Jazz, he emerged as a talented shooter in the NBA. From 2004 to 2010, he displayed a talent for making big shots in pressure situations, earning him the nickname of "the Money Man" and "Memo is Money" among Jazz fans. Okur was also the first Turkish player in NBA history to win an NBA championship with the Detroit Pistons in 2004.

In 2016, Okur was named a player development coach for the Phoenix Suns, becoming the first Turkish citizen to enter the coaching world in the NBA.

== Early career ==
Okur notes Toni Kukoč was his favorite player while he was growing up. He helped the Turkish 22-and-under national team to 6th place at the 1997 world championship. He was transferred to Efes Pilsen (now known as Anadolu Efes) in 2000 and won a championship in the 2001–2002 Turkish Basketball League season. He averaged 13.5 points per game during his last season in Turkey.

== Professional career ==
=== Detroit Pistons (2002–2004) ===
Okur was selected 38th overall in the second round of the 2001 NBA draft by the Detroit Pistons. He played two seasons for the Pistons from 2002–03 to 2003–04. On 7 November 2003, Okur led the Pistons to a 105–99 win over the Milwaukee Bucks, with a career-high 18 rebounds and 12 points. During the 2004 NBA playoffs, Okur helped Detroit win the NBA championship in June 2004. He became the first Turkish player to win an NBA championship. Due to salary cap limitations, the Pistons were unable to pay a top-level salary for Okur, and Okur was able to parlay his success into a six-year, US$50 million contract with the Utah Jazz.

=== Utah Jazz (2004–2011) ===
Okur signed with the Jazz on 27 July 2004 and played seven seasons in Utah from 2004 to 2011, spending the majority of his career with the team. Standing 6 ft 11 in (2.11 m) and 290 lbs (132 kg), Okur played the center and power forward positions for the Jazz. In his first season (2004–2005) with Utah, he played in all 82 games, starting in 25 of them. Nicknamed "Memo", Okur made his presence felt during his second (2005–2006) season with Utah, increasing his scoring average from 12.9 points per game the previous season to 18.0 points per game. He started in all 82 games for the second straight season, the only Utah Jazz player to do so. In his third season, he continued to be a key player for Utah.

He was named to the Western Conference All-Star team for the 2007 NBA All-Star Game. He and Ray Allen were selected as replacements for injured original members Allen Iverson and Steve Nash. He was the first Turkish player to participate in this event.

On 12 January 2009, Okur scored a career-high in points with 43 against the Indiana Pacers during a 120–113 win.

On 10 July 2009, Okur signed a two-year contract extension reportedly worth approximately $21 million.

On 17 April 2010, Okur ruptured his Achilles' tendon during the first game of the post-season against the Denver Nuggets, eliminating him from the remainder of the NBA playoffs, as well as the World Basketball Championships in his native Turkey later that summer.

He returned on 17 December 2010 and scored 2 points against the New Orleans Hornets.

=== Türk Telekom Ankara (2011) ===
In September 2011, Okur signed a contract with Türk Telekom B.K. His contract had an out-clause, which allowed him to return to the NBA when the 2011 NBA lockout was resolved.

=== New Jersey Nets (2011–2012) ===
On 22 December 2011, Okur was traded to the New Jersey Nets for a 2015 second round pick (later used to select Pat Connaughton). This reunited him with former Jazz teammate, PG Deron Williams, who was traded to the Nets the previous season. Okur played 17 games for the Nets, averaging 7.6 points, 4.8 rebounds and 1.8 assists per game.

On 15 March 2012, Okur was traded to the Portland Trail Blazers along with Shawne Williams and a 2012 first-round pick (later used to select Damian Lillard in exchange for Gerald Wallace.

He was waived by Portland on 21 March 2012.

Later in 2012, Okur decided to retire from basketball, citing injuries. In Okur's final two years in the league, he only played 30 games total. His final game was on 25 January 2012, where he recorded 11 points, six rebounds and three assists in a 97–90 win over the 76ers.

== NBA career statistics ==
Legend
GP	Games played	GS	Games started	MPG	Minutes per game
FG%	Field goal percentage	3P%	3-point field goal percentage	FT%	Free throw percentage
RPG	Rebounds per game	APG	Assists per game	SPG	Steals per game
BPG	Blocks per game	PPG	Points per game	**Bold**	Career high
†	Won an NBA championship	*	Led the league

=== Regular season ===
Year	Team	GP	GS	MPG	FG%	3P%	FT%	RPG	APG	SPG	BPG	PPG
2002–03	Detroit	72	9	19.0	.426	.339	.733	4.7	1.0	.3	.5	6.9
2003–04†	Detroit	71	33	22.3	.463	.375	.775	5.9	1.0	.5	**.9**	9.6
2004–05	Utah	**82**	25	28.1	.468	.270	**.850**	7.5	2.0	.4	.8	12.9
2005–06	Utah	**82***	**82***	**35.9**	.460	.342	.780	**9.1**	**2.4**	.5	**.9**	**18.0**
2006–07	Utah	80	80	33.3	.462	.384	.765	7.2	2.0	.5	.5	17.6
2007–08	Utah	72	72	33.2	.445	.388	.804	7.7	2.0	**.8**	.4	14.5
2008–09	Utah	72	72	33.5	**.485**	**.446**	.817	7.7	1.7	**.8**	.7	17.0
2009–10	Utah	73	73	29.4	.458	.385	.820	7.1	1.6	.5	**1.1**	13.5
2010–11	Utah	13	0	12.9	.355	.313	.750	2.3	1.5	.3	.3	4.9
2011–12	New Jersey	17	14	26.7	.374	.319	.600	4.8	1.8	.5	.3	7.6
Career		634	460	29.1	.458	.375	.797	7.0	1.7	.5	.7	13.5
All-Star		1	0	15.0	1.000	.000	.000	2.0	1.0	.0	.0	4.0

=== Playoffs ===
Year	Team	GP	GS	MPG	FG%	3P%	FT%	RPG	APG	SPG	BPG	PPG
2003	Detroit	17	0	19.0	.438	.538	.531	4.1	.8	.7	.7	5.5
2004†	Detroit	**22**	0	11.5	.470	.400	.692	2.8	.4	.2	.4	3.7
2007	Utah	17	**17**	34.4	.388	.316	.786	7.8	1.8	**1.4**	**.9**	11.8
2008	Utah	12	12	**38.5**	.423	.373	.773	**11.8**	1.9	.7	.7	**15.4**
2009	Utah	2	2	21.5	.167	.333	.750	5.0	**2.0**	.0	.5	4.0
2010	Utah	1	1	11.0	**1.000**	**1.000**	**1.000**	2.0	.0	.0	.0	7.0
Career		71	32	23.6	.415	.362	.713	5.9	1.1	.7	.6	8.1

== Coaching career ==
Before working as a coach, Okur was an ambassador for the Utah Jazz from 2014 to August 2016. On 13 September 2016, he agreed to a deal that made him one of the newest player development coaches for the Phoenix Suns. Okur would soon become the first Turkish-born coach to ever be a part of an NBA coaching staff in some capacity. With the earlier hiring of Canadian Jay Triano, it would also mark the first time that two foreign-born coaches would take part in participating in the Suns' coaching staff at the same time. He would also be reunited with his former teammate Earl Watson and former coach Tyrone Corbin, although their roles would be different with Watson being the head coach and Corbin being an assistant coach.

After seeing slight improvements in his first season as a player development coach, Okur was fired alongside assistant coach Nate Bjorkgren and fellow player development coach Jason Fraser on 22 October 2017. The sudden firing came after the Suns had some very poor performances to start out their 50th anniversary season, leading to a 0–3 start to their season.

== Personal life ==
He is married to actress and former Miss Turkey finalist Yeliz Çalışkan. They have a daughter, Melisa, born on 21 March 2007, and two sons, Yiğit Mehmet Okur, born on 19 February 2010, and Mert Mehmet Okur, born on 19 November 2014. He and his family currently live in San Diego, California.

== See also ==
- List of European basketball players in the United States
- List of foreign NBA coaches
