= Sundiata Gaines =

American basketball player (born 1986)

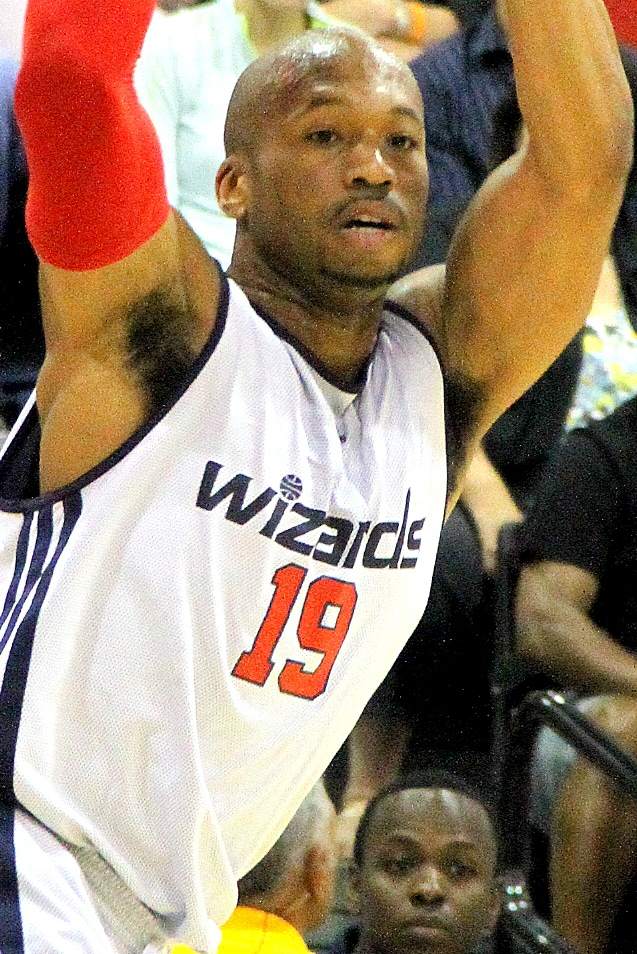
- Gaines with the Washington Wizards during the 2013 NBA Summer League

Free agent
- Position: Point guard

Personal information
- Born: April 18, 1986 (age 40) Queens, New York, U.S.
- Listed height: 6 ft 1 in (1.85 m)
- Listed weight: 195 lb (88 kg)

Career information
- High school: Archbishop Molloy (Queens, New York)
- College: Georgia (2004–2008)
- NBA draft: 2008: undrafted
- Playing career: 2008–2017; 2021–present

Career history
- 2008–2009: NGC Cantù
- 2009–2010: Idaho Stampede
- 2010: Utah Jazz
- 2010–2011: Minnesota Timberwolves
- 2011: Toronto Raptors
- 2011–2012: New Jersey Nets
- 2011: Armia
- 2012–2013: Fujian Sturgeons
- 2013–2014: Beşiktaş
- 2014: Reno Bighorns
- 2014: Guaiqueríes de Margarita
- 2014–2015: Sidigas Avellino
- 2015: Reno Bighorns
- 2016: Ironi Nes Ziona
- 2016–2017: Salt Lake City Stars
- 2021: Peñarol

Career highlights
- Israeli League All-Star (2016); NBA D-League All-Star (2010); 2× Second-team All-SEC (2007, 2008); SEC All-Defensive Team (2008)
- Stats at NBA.com
- Stats at Basketball Reference

Sundiata Kofi Gaines (born April 18, 1986) is an American professional basketball player who is a free agent. He played college basketball for the Georgia Bulldogs.

== High school career ==
Gaines attended Archbishop Molloy High School in Queens, New York. As a senior, he averaged 28.2 points per game, finishing his career as the number 3 scorer in Stanners' history.

== College career ==
In his freshman season at University of Georgia, Gaines had a very productive year as he led the Bulldogs in minutes, assists, steals, free throw attempts and makes, as well as ranking second in rebounding. In 27 games, he averaged 12.0 points, 4.9 rebounds, 2.9 assists and 2.4 steals per game.

In his sophomore season, he ranked third among all SEC players in steals at 2.0 per game. In 30 games, he averaged 10.3 points, 5.1 rebounds and 3.4 assists per game. He was named the team's MVP by the coaching staff at the season's end.

In his junior season, he led Georgia in minutes, starts, rebounds, assists and steals. He was also named to the 2007 All-SEC second team. In 32 games, he averaged 10.5 points, 5.7 rebounds 4.8 assists and 2.3 steals per game.

In his senior season, he was named to the 2008 All-SEC second team and All-Defensive team. In 34 games, he averaged 14.8 points, 6.0 rebounds, 4.2 assists and 1.8 steals per game.

== Professional career ==
=== NGC Cantù (2008–2009) ===
Gaines went undrafted in the 2008 NBA draft. In July 2008, he signed with NGC Cantù of Italy for the 2008–09 season.

=== Idaho Stampede (2009–2010) ===
On November 5, 2009, Gaines was selected with the 15th overall pick by the Idaho Stampede in the 2009 NBA D-League draft.

=== Utah Jazz (2010) ===
On January 5, 2010, Gaines signed a 10-day contract with the Utah Jazz. On January 14, in just his fifth NBA game, he hit a 3-pointer at the buzzer to give the Jazz a dramatic 97–96 win over the Cleveland Cavaliers. It was the first 3-pointer of his NBA career. The next day, Gaines signed a second 10-day contract with the Jazz. On January 25, he signed with the Jazz for the rest of the season.

Gaines joined the Utah Jazz for the 2010 NBA Summer League. On October 22, 2010, he was waived by the Jazz.

=== Minnesota Timberwolves (2010–2011) ===
On November 12, 2010, Gaines signed with the Minnesota Timberwolves. On January 4, 2011, he was waived by the Timberwolves.

=== Toronto Raptors (2011) ===
On January 13, 2011, Gaines signed a 10-day contract with the Toronto Raptors. On January 24, he signed a second 10-day contract with the Raptors. On January 26, Gaines was waived by the Raptors.

=== New Jersey Nets (2011) ===
On February 28, 2011, Gaines signed a 10-day contract with the New Jersey Nets. On March 10, he signed a second 10-day contract with the Nets. On March 20, Gaines signed a multi-year deal with the Nets. On March 23, Gaines suffered a season-ending right hip injury.

=== Armia (2011) ===
On September 9, 2011, Gaines signed with BC Armia of Georgia for the duration of the NBA lockout.

=== Return to New Jersey (2011–2012) ===
In December 2011, Gaines re-joined the New Jersey Nets after the lockout ended.

=== Fuijan Xunxing (2012–2013) ===
On September 6, 2012, Gaines signed with the Indiana Pacers. However, he was later waived by the Pacers on October 22.

On November 13, 2012, he signed with the Fujian Xunxing of the Chinese Basketball Association for the 2012–13 season.

=== Beşiktaş (2013–2014) ===
Gaines joined the Washington Wizards for the 2013 NBA Summer League.

On November 22, 2013, he signed a two-month deal with Beşiktaş of Turkey. On January 15, 2014, he played his final game for Beşiktaş, recording 4 points, 7 assists and 2 steals in 15 minutes of play.

=== Reno Bighorns (2014) ===
On January 29, 2014, Gaines was acquired by the Austin Toros. On January 31, he was traded to the Springfield Armor. On February 4, Gaines was traded to the Reno Bighorns.

=== Guaiqueríes de Margarita (2014) ===
On April 22, 2014, Gaines signed with Guaiqueríes de Margarita of Venezuela for the rest of the 2014 LPB season.

=== Sidigas Avellino (2014–2015) ===
On August 28, 2014, Gaines signed with Sidigas Avellino of Italy for the 2014–15 season. In 29 games for Sidigas, he averaged 11.3 points, 3.3 rebounds, 2.4 assists and 1.2 steals per game.

=== Return to the Bighorns (2015) ===
In July 2015, Gaines joined the Detroit Pistons for the 2015 NBA Summer League. On November 2, 2015, he was acquired by the Reno Bighorns, returning to the franchise for a second stint. On December 8, he was waived by the Bighorns after appearing in just four games.

=== Ironi Nes Ziona (2016) ===
On January 2, 2016, Gaines was acquired by Openjobmetis Varese of the Italian League. However, before playing a game for them, he left the Italian club on January 13 to sign with Ironi Nes Ziona of the Israeli Premier League for the rest of the season.

=== Salt Lake City Stars (2016–2017) ===
On November 12, 2016, Gaines signed with the Salt Lake City Stars of the NBA Development League.

In 2017, Gaines competed for The Washington Generals in The Basketball Tournament. Gaines was the leading scorer for the team with 22 points in the one game they played before being eliminated by The Matadors.

On February 19, 2018, Gaines was reported to have signed with Defensor Sporting of the Liga Uruguaya de Basketball. However, he never played a game for the team.

== Career statistics ==
Legend
GP	Games played	GS	Games started	MPG	Minutes per game
FG%	Field goal percentage	3P%	3-point field goal percentage	FT%	Free throw percentage
RPG	Rebounds per game	APG	Assists per game	SPG	Steals per game
BPG	Blocks per game	PPG	Points per game	**Bold**	Career high

=== NBA ===
==== Regular season ====
Year	Team	GP	GS	MPG	FG%	3P%	FT%	RPG	APG	SPG	BPG	PPG
2009–10	Utah	32	0	6.8	**.463**	.269	.500	.9	1.2	.4	.0	3.3
2010–11	Minnesota	8	0	8.1	.318	.333	.500	.8	.8	.4	.0	2.6
2010–11	Toronto	6	0	**15.0**	.429	.200	.333	1.3	1.8	.7	**.2**	**5.8**
2010–11	New Jersey	10	0	14.6	.417	.235	.550	**2.4**	**2.5**	.9	.0	5.5
2011–12	New Jersey	**57**	**12**	13.9	.376	**.341**	**.615**	1.9	2.2	**1.0**	.0	5.1
Career		113	12	11.6	.397	.301	.562	1.5	1.8	.7	.0	4.5

==== Playoffs ====
Year	Team	GP	GS	MPG	FG%	3P%	FT%	RPG	APG	SPG	BPG	PPG
2010	Utah	5	0	1.4	.833	1.000	.000	.4	.0	.0	.0	2.2
