= Dennis Horner =

American basketball player (born 1988)

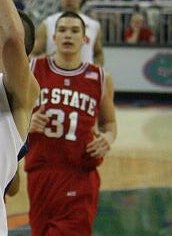

Personal information
- Born: February 5, 1988 (age 38) Linwood, New Jersey, U.S.
- Listed height: 6 ft 9 in (2.06 m)
- Listed weight: 230 lb (104 kg)

Career information
- High school: Holy Spirit (Absecon, New Jersey)
- College: NC State (2006–2010)
- NBA draft: 2010: undrafted
- Playing career: 2010–2018
- Position: Power forward
- Number: 31

Career history
- 2010–2011: Omonia BC
- 2011–2012: Springfield Armor
- 2011–2012: New Jersey Nets
- 2012: Artland Dragons
- 2013–2014: Springfield Armor
- 2014: Bakersfield Jam
- 2014–2015: Artland Dragons
- 2015–2016: Obras Sanitarias
- 2018: Instituto de Córdoba

Career highlights
- All-NBA D-League Third Team (2012)
- Stats at NBA.com
- Stats at Basketball Reference

Dennis Horner (born February 5, 1988) is an American professional basketball player for Instituto de Córdoba of the Argentine Liga Nacional de Básquet.

== Early life and college ==
Horner grew up in Linwood, New Jersey, and attended Holy Spirit High School in Absecon, New Jersey, where he was named the co-basketball player of the year in 2006 by The Press of Atlantic City. He is an alumnus of the North Carolina State University men's basketball team. In his final season (2009–10), Horner averaged 11.9 points and 4.9 rebounds per game.

== Professional ==
After college, Horner started the 2010–11 season with RBC Verviers-Pepinster but after not appearing in a game for them, he signed a contract in Cyprus for club Omonia BC where he played 13 games averaging 11.6 points in 29.3 minutes. Before the 2011–12 season, he made himself eligible for the NBA Development League draft, where he was picked 47th overall by the Springfield Armor, which was in the process of becoming affiliated solely with the NBA's New Jersey Nets. In December, it was announced Horner was one of three players on the Armor invited to Nets' training camp following the 2011 NBA lockout. At that point he had been averaging 15.0 points, 7.7 rebounds and 1.2 assists for Springfield. On December 23, the Nets announced that Horner had made the team, and would start the season on the Nets' roster. Horner was waived by the Nets on January 18, 2012. Horner then returned to the Springfield Armor.

On March 30, 2012, Horner was re-signed by the Nets on a 10-day contract.

In October 2012, he signed with the Artland Dragons of Germany. He left in November 2012.

On January 3, 2013, Horner was re-acquired by the Springfield Armor. On November 1, 2013, he was re-acquired by the Armor for their 2013 training camp. On February 20, 2014, he was traded to the Bakersfield Jam.

On August 1, 2014, he signed a one-year deal with Artland Dragons, returning for second stint.

== Career statistics ==
Legend
| GP | Games played | GS | Games started | MPG | Minutes per game |
| FG% | Field goal percentage | 3P% | 3-point field goal percentage | FT% | Free throw percentage |
| RPG | Rebounds per game | APG | Assists per game | SPG | Steals per game |
| BPG | Blocks per game | PPG | Points per game | **Bold** | Career high |

=== NBA ===
| Year | Team | GP | GS | MPG | FG% | 3P% | FT% | RPG | APG | SPG | BPG | PPG |
|---|---|---|---|---|---|---|---|---|---|---|---|---|
| 2011–12 | New Jersey | 8 | 0 | 2.8 | .250 | .000 | .750 | .6 | .0 | .0 | .0 | .6 |
| Career | | 8 | 0 | 2.8 | .250 | .000 | .750 | .6 | .0 | .0 | .0 | .6 |
