= 2011–12 New Jersey Nets season =

NBA professional basketball team season

- Head coach: Avery Johnson
- Owners: Mikhail Prokhorov
- Arena: Prudential Center

Results
- Record: 22–44 (.333)
- Place: Division: 5th (Atlantic); Conference: 12th (Eastern)
- Playoff finish: Did not qualify
- Stats at Basketball Reference

Local media
- Television: YES Network, WWOR
- Radio: WFAN

The 2011–12 New Jersey Nets season was the 45th season of the franchise, their 36th in the National Basketball Association (NBA), and their 35th and final season in New Jersey before moving to Brooklyn, New York and changing their name to the Brooklyn Nets for the 2012–13 season. The Nets finished 22–44, last in the Atlantic Division and 12th overall in the Eastern Conference and failed to make the playoffs for a fifth consecutive season. Point guard Deron Williams led the team in scoring (21.0), assists (8.7), and minutes per game (36.3) and was the team's lone selection in the 2012 NBA All-Star Game. Forward Kris Humphries led the team with 11.0 rebounds and 1.19 blocks per game and games played (62).

== Key dates ==
- June 23: The 2011 NBA draft took place at Prudential Center in Newark, New Jersey.
- December 26: The regular season started with a victory against the Washington Wizards.
- April 23: The Nets play their final game in New Jersey against the Philadelphia 76ers.

== Draft picks ==
Round	Pick	Player	Position	Nationality	College/Club Team
1	25	MarShon Brooks	G	United States	Providence
2	31	Bojan Bogdanović	F	Croatia	Fenerbahçe Ülker
2	36	Jordan Williams	F	United States	Maryland

The team appeared in the draft for the final time as the New Jersey Nets.

== Roster ==
2011–12 New Jersey Nets roster
Players

Pos.	No.	Player	Height	Weight	DOB	From
G/F	9	MarShon Brooks	6 ft 5 in (1.96 m)	200 lb (91 kg)	1989-01-26	Providence
G	2	Jordan Farmar	6 ft 2 in (1.88 m)	180 lb (82 kg)	1986-11-30	UCLA
PG	1	Sundiata Gaines	6 ft 1 in (1.85 m)	200 lb (91 kg)	1986-04-18	Georgia
SF	14	Gerald Green	6 ft 8 in (2.03 m)	200 lb (91 kg)	1986-01-26	Gulf Shores Academy (TX)
PF	43	Kris Humphries	6 ft 9 in (2.06 m)	235 lb (107 kg)	1985-02-06	Minnesota
SF	10	Damion James	6 ft 7 in (2.01 m)	220 lb (100 kg)	1987-10-07	Texas
PG	7	Armon Johnson	6 ft 3 in (1.91 m)	195 lb (88 kg)	1989-02-23	Nevada
C	11	Brook Lopez	7 ft 0 in (2.13 m)	265 lb (120 kg)	1988-04-01	Stanford
SG	22	Anthony Morrow	6 ft 5 in (1.96 m)	210 lb (95 kg)	1985-09-27	Georgia Tech
C	27	Johan Petro	7 ft 0 in (2.13 m)	247 lb (112 kg)	1986-01-27	France
G/F	92	DeShawn Stevenson	6 ft 5 in (1.96 m)	218 lb (99 kg)	1981-04-03	Washington Union HS (CA)
SF	45	Gerald Wallace	6 ft 7 in (2.01 m)	220 lb (100 kg)	1982-07-03	Alabama
G	8	Deron Williams	6 ft 3 in (1.91 m)	209 lb (95 kg)	1984-06-26	Illinois
F/C	20	Jordan Williams	6 ft 10 in (2.08 m)	260 lb (118 kg)	1990-10-11	Maryland
F/C	33	Shelden Williams	6 ft 9 in (2.06 m)	250 lb (113 kg)	1983-10-21	Duke

Coaches
Head coach
- Avery Johnson
Assistant(s)
- P. J. Carlesimo
- Mario Elie
- Tom Barrise
- Doug Overton
- Popeye Jones

Legend
- (DP) Unsigned draft pick
- (FA) Free agent
- (S) Suspended
- (DL) On assignment to
  D-League affiliate
- Injured

== Pre-season ==
Due to the 2011 NBA lockout negotiations, the programmed pre-season schedule, along with the first two weeks of the regular season were scrapped, and a two-game pre-season was set for each team once the lockout concluded.

2011 pre-season game log
Pre-season: 0–2 (home: 0–1; road: 0–1)

Game	Date	Team	Score	High points	High rebounds	High assists	Location Attendance	Record
1	December 17	New York	L 83–92	Brook Lopez; Anthony Morrow (15)	Brook Lopez (11)	Deron Williams (6)	Prudential Center; 13,027	0–1
2	December 21	@ New York	L 82–88	Deron Williams (21)	Shelden Williams; Johan Petro (10)	Deron Williams (7)	Madison Square Garden	0–2

2011–12 season schedule

== Regular season ==
=== Standings ===
Atlantic Division	W	L	PCT	GB	Home	Road	Div	GP
y-Boston Celtics	39	27	.591	–	24–9	15–18	8–6	66
x-New York Knicks	36	30	.545	3	22–11	14–19	8–6	66
x-Philadelphia 76ers	35	31	.530	4	19–14	16–17	7–6	66
Toronto Raptors	23	43	.348	16	13–20	10–23	7–8	66
New Jersey Nets	22	44	.333	17	9–24	13–20	5–9	66

Eastern Conference
#	Team	W	L	PCT	GB	GP
1	z-Chicago Bulls	50	16	.758	–	66
2	y-Miami Heat *	46	20	.697	4.0	66
3	x-Indiana Pacers *	42	24	.636	8.0	66
4	y-Boston Celtics	39	27	.591	11.0	66
5	x-Atlanta Hawks	40	26	.606	10.0	66
6	x-Orlando Magic	37	29	.561	13.0	66
7	x-New York Knicks	36	30	.545	14.0	66
8	x-Philadelphia 76ers	35	31	.530	15.0	66
9	Milwaukee Bucks	31	35	.470	19.0	66
10	Detroit Pistons	25	41	.379	25.0	66
11	Toronto Raptors	23	43	.348	27.0	66
12	New Jersey Nets	22	44	.333	28.0	66
13	Cleveland Cavaliers	21	45	.318	29.0	66
14	Washington Wizards	20	46	.303	30.0	66
15	Charlotte Bobcats	7	59	.106	43.0	66

=== Game log ===
2011–12 game log
Total: 22–44 (Home: 9–24; Road: 13–20)
December: 1–3 (home: 0–1; road: 1–2)

Game	Date	Team	Score	High points	High rebounds	High assists	Location Attendance	Record
1	December 26	@ Washington	W 90–84	Deron Williams (23)	Kris Humphries (16)	Deron Williams (9)	Verizon Center; 17,102	1–0
2	December 27	Atlanta	L 70–106	Marshon Brooks (17)	Kris Humphries (6)	Sundiata Gaines (4)	Prudential Center; 18,711	1–1
3	December 29	@ Orlando	L 78–94	Marshon Brooks (17)	Kris Humphries (10)	Deron Williams (7)	Amway Center; 18,954	1–2
4	December 30	@ Atlanta	L 98–105	Deron Williams (23)	Kris Humphries (13)	Deron Williams (6)	Philips Arena; 16,300	1–3

January : 6–12 (home: 2–5; road: 4–7)

Game	Date	Team	Score	High points	High rebounds	High assists	Location Attendance	Record
5	January 1	@ Cleveland	L 82–98	Anthony Morrow (15)	Mehmet Okur (8)	Deron Williams (5)	Quicken Loans Arena; 15,084	1–4
6	January 2	Indiana	L 94–108	Deron Williams (22)	Marshon Brooks (7)	Deron Williams (8)	Prudential Center; 12,519	1–5
7	January 4	@ Boston	L 70–89	MarShon Brooks (17)	Shelden Williams (9)	Farmar & Gaines (6)	TD Garden; 18,624	1–6
8	January 6	@ Toronto	W 97–85	Morrow & D. Williams (24)	Kris Humphries (16)	Deron Williams (6)	Air Canada Centre; 16,771	2–6
9	January 7	Miami	L 90–101	Kris Humphries (25)	Shelden Williams (13)	Deron Williams (10)	Prudential Center; 18,711	2–7
10	January 9	Atlanta	L 101–106	Anthony Morrow (20)	Marshon Brooks (10)	Deron Williams (14)	Prudential Center; 12,259	2–8
11	January 11	@ Denver	L 115–123	Jordan Farmar (26)	Kris Humphries (9)	Deron Williams (13)	Pepsi Center; 14,139	2–9
12	January 13	@ Phoenix	W 110–103	Deron Williams (35)	Mehmet Okur (7)	Deron Williams (14)	US Airways Center; 15,191	3–9
13	January 14	@ Utah	L 94–107	Kris Humphries (18)	Kris Humphries (10)	Deron Williams (5)	EnergySolutions Arena; 19,557	3–10
14	January 16	@ L. A. Clippers	L 91–101	Marshon Brooks (19)	Brooks & S. Williams (8)	Jordan Farmar (7)	Staples Center; 19,060	3–11
15	January 18	Golden State	W 107–100	Monta Ellis (30)	Kris Humphries (15)	Deron Williams (10)	Prudential Center	4–11
16	January 21	Oklahoma City	L 74–84	Russell Westbrook (21)	Kris Humphries (16)	Deron Williams (6)	Prudential Center	4–12
17	January 22	Charlotte	W 97–87	MarShon Brooks (20)	Kris Humphries (10)	Deron Williams (10)	Prudential Center	5–12
18	January 23	@ Chicago	L 95–110	Richard Hamilton (22)	Joakim Noah (10)	Richard Hamilton (10)	United Center	5–13
19	January 25	@ Philadelphia	W 97–90 (OT)	Deron Williams (34)	Kris Humphries (19)	Deron Williams (11)	Wells Fargo Center	6–13
20	January 27	@ Cleveland	W 99–96	Kyrie Irving (32)	Kris Humphries (11)	Deron Williams (10)	Quicken Loans Arena	7–13
21	January 29	Toronto	L 73–94	DeMar DeRozan (27)	Shelden Williams (9)	José Calderón (9)	Prudential Center	7–14
22	January 31	@ Indiana	L 99–106	Deron Williams (34)	Roy Hibbert (14)	Deron Williams (7)	Bankers Life Fieldhouse	7–15

February : 4–10 (home: 1–7; road: 3–3)

Game	Date	Team	Score	High points	High rebounds	High assists	Location Attendance	Record
23	February 1	Detroit	W 99–96	Deron Williams (26)	Shelden Williams (11)	Deron Williams (9)	Prudential Center	8–15
24	February 3	Minnesota	L 105–108	Anthony Morrow (42)	Nikola Peković (11)	Deron Williams (14)	Prudential Center	8–16
25	February 4	New York	L 92–99	Jeremy Lin (25)	Kris Humphries (12)	Deron Williams (11)	Madison Square Garden	8–17
26	February 6	Chicago	L 87–108	Deron Williams (25)	Joakim Noah (12)	CJ Watson (11)	Prudential Center	8–18
27	February 8	Detroit	L 92–99	Deron Williams (34)	Kris Humphries (16)	Deron Williams (7)	Prudential Center	8–19
28	February 10	@ Detroit	L 92–109	Jonas Jerebko (20)	Greg Monroe (11)	Sundiata Gaines (6)	The Palace of Auburn Hills	8–20
29	February 11	San Antonio	L 89–103	Deron Williams (27)	Tim Duncan (10)	Deron Williams (8)	Prudential Center	8–21
30	February 15	Memphis	L 100–105	Deron Williams (26)	Marreese Speights (18)	Deron Williams (11)	Prudential Center	8–22
31	February 16	@ Indiana	L 88–93	Danny Granger (32)	Roy Hibbert (11)	Paul George (5)	Bankers Life Fieldhouse	8–23
32	February 18	@ Chicago	W 97–85	Deron Williams (29)	Kris Humphries (18)	Deron Williams (8)	United Center	9–23
33	February 19	Milwaukee	L 85–92	Ersan İlyasova (29)	Ersan İlyasova (25)	Shaun Livingston (6)	Prudential Center	9–24
34	February 20	@ New York	W 100–92	Deron Williams (38)	Kris Humphries (14)	Jeremy Lin (9)	Madison Square Garden	10–24
35	February 22	Orlando	L 91–108	Marshon Brooks (24)	Dwight Howard (17)	Deron Williams (8)	Prudential Center	10–25
All-Star Break
36	February 28	@ Dallas	W 93–92	Brook Lopez (38)	Kris Humphries (15)	Deron Williams (12)	American Airlines Center	11–25

March: 8–10 (home: 4–6; road: 4–4)

Game	Date	Team	Score	High points	High rebounds	High assists	Location Attendance	Record
37	March 2	@ Boston	L 94–107	Brook Lopez (28)	Kevin Garnett (10)	Rajon Rondo (13)	TD Garden	11–26
38	March 4	@ Charlotte	W 104–101	Deron Williams (57)	Kris Humphries (13)	Boris Diaw (8)	Time Warner Cable Arena	12–26
39	March 6	@ Miami	L 78–108	Deron Williams (16)	Johan Petro (8)	Deron Williams (4)	American Airlines Arena; 19,600	12–27
40	March 7	L. A. Clippers	W 101–100	Deron Williams (21)	Kris Humphries (11)	Deron Williams (10)	Prudential Center; 18,711	13–27
41	March 9	@ Charlotte	W 83–74	Kris Humphries (20)	Kris Humphries (15)	Jordan Farmar (7)	Time Warner Cable Arena; 14,672	14–27
42	March 10	Houston	L 106–112	Gerald Green (26)	Johan Petro (9)	MarShon Brooks (7)	Prudential Center; 14,834	14–28
43	March 12	Milwaukee	L 99–105	Kris Humphries (31)	Kris Humphries (18)	Jordan Farmar (7)	Prudential Center; 12,930	14–29
44	March 14	Toronto	W 98–84	Gerald Green (26)	Kris Humphries (21)	Marshon Brooks (5)	Prudential Center; 10,701	15–29
45	March 16	@ Orlando	L 70–86	Dwight Howard (18)	Ryan Anderson (11)	Jameer Nelson (6)	Amway Center; 18,938	15–30
46	March 17	New Orleans	L 94–102	Chris Kaman (20)	Kris Humphries (16)	Deron Williams (12)	Prudential Center; 11,271	15–31
47	March 19	Cleveland	L 100–105	Deron Williams (28)	Antawn Jamison (13)	Deron Williams (8)	Prudential Center; 11,254	15–32
48	March 21	Washington	L 89–108	Jordan Crawford (23)	Kris Humphries (16)	John Wall (8)	Prudential Center; 10,097	15–33
49	March 23	@ Atlanta	L 84–93	Josh Smith (30)	Josh Smith (12)	Deron Williams (8)	Philips Arena; 14,129	15–34
50	March 24	Charlotte	W 102–89	Kris Humphries (20)	Kris Humphries (16)	Deron Williams (14)	Prudential Center; 13,297	16–34
51	March 26	Utah	L 84–105	Paul Millsap (24)	Paul Millsap (13)	Devin Harris (11)	Prudential Center; 10,310	16–35
52	March 28	Indiana	W 100–84	Deron Williams (30)	Kris Humphries (8)	Deron Williams (9)	Prudential Center; 10,817	17–35
53	March 30	@ Golden State	W 102–100	Gerald Wallace (24)	Gerald Wallace (18)	Deron Williams (20)	Oracle Arena; 19,596	18–35
54	March 31	@ Sacramento	W 111–99	Anthony Morrow (24)	Kris Humphries (12)	Deron Williams (15)	Power Balance Pavilion; 14,370	19–35

April : 3–9 (home: 2–5; road: 1–4)

Game	Date	Team	Score	High points	High rebounds	High assists	Location Attendance	Record
55	April 3	@ L. A. Lakers	L 87–91	Deron Williams (20)	Kris Humphries (15)	Deron Williams (6)	Staples Center; 18,997	19–36
56	April 4	@ Portland	L 88–101	Kris Humphries (21)	Kris Humphries (11)	MarShon Brooks (6)	Rose Garden; 20,464	19–37
57	April 6	Washington	W 110–98	Gerald Wallace; Deron Williams (19)	Kris Humphries (12)	Deron Williams (13)	Prudential Center; 12,783	20–37
58	April 8	Cleveland	W 122–117 (OT)	Gerald Green (32)	Kris Humphries (11)	Deron Williams (10)	Prudential Center; 11,341	21–37
59	April 10	Philadelphia	L 88–107	Kris Humphries (20)	Kris Humphries (10)	Deron Williams (5)	Prudential Center; 15,376	21–38
60	April 13	@ Philadelphia	W 95–89	Johan Petro (23)	Kris Humphries (13)	Deron Williams (10)	Wells Fargo Center; 19,169	22–38
61	April 14	Boston	L 82–94	Gerald Green (15)	Jordan Williams (14)	Deron Williams (14)	Prudential Center; 18,711	22–39
62	April 16	Miami	L 98–101	Kris Humphries (29)	Kris Humphries (8)	Sundiata Gaines (7)	Prudential Center; 18,711	22–40
63	April 18	New York	L 95–104	Gerald Wallace (21)	Kris Humphries (15)	Sundiata Gaines (6)	Prudential Center; 18,711	22–41
64	April 21	@ Milwaukee	L 95–106	Gerald Wallace (18)	Gerald Wallace (11)	Gerald Wallace (4)	Bradley Center; 15,939	22–42
65	April 23	Philadelphia	L 87–105	MarShon Brooks (18)	Kris Humphries (12)	MarShon Brooks; Gerald Wallace (4)	Prudential Center; 18,711	22–43
66	April 26	@ Toronto	L 67–98	Armon Johnson; Anthony Morrow (11)	Johan Petro (12)	Armon Johnson (5)	Air Canada Centre; 18,161	22–44

2011–12 season schedule

== Player statistics ==
Legend
GP	Games played	GS	Games started	MPG	Minutes per game
FG%	Field-goal percentage	3P%	3-point field-goal percentage	FT%	Free-throw percentage
RPG	Rebounds per game	APG	Assists per game	SPG	Steals per game
BPG	Blocks per game	PPG	Points per game

=== Season ===
New Jersey Nets statistics
Player	GP	GS	MPG	FG%	3P%	FT%	RPG	APG	SPG	BPG	PPG
Keith Bogans^{[1]}	5	1	18.8	.381	.250	.400	2.2	.6	.4	.0	4.2
MarShon Brooks	56	47	29.4	.428	.313	.764	3.6	2.3	.9	.3	12.6
Andre Emmett^{[1]}	6	0	7.5	.571	.000	.625	1.0	0.2	.3	.2	2.2
Jordan Farmar	39	5	21.3	.467	.440	.905	1.6	3.3	.6	.1	10.4
Sundiata Gaines	57	12	13.9	.376	.341	.615	1.9	2.2	1.0	.0	5.1
Gerald Green	31	2	25.2	.481	.391	.754	3.5	1.1	.9	.5	12.9
Dennis Horner^{[1]}	8	0	2.8	.250	.000	.750	.6	.0	.0	.0	.6
Kris Humphries	62	62	34.9	.481		.752	11.0	1.5	.8	1.2	13.8
Damion James	7	7	24.3	.371	.000	.667	4.7	.4	1.0	1.0	4.9
Armon Johnson^{[1]}	8	0	14.9	.452	.333	1.000	1.5	1.4	.5	.0	5.6
Brook Lopez	5	5	27.2	.494		.625	3.6	1.2	.2	.8	19.2
Anthony Morrow	62	18	26.4	.413	.371	.933	2.0	1.0	.7	.1	12.0
Mehmet Okur	17	14	26.7	.374	.319	.600	4.8	1.8	.5	.3	7.6
Larry Owens^{[1]}	7	0	10.7	.364	.400	.750	1.9	.6	.0	.1	1.9
Johan Petro	59	10	15.6	.419	1.000	.838	3.8	.8	.4	.4	4.2
Jerry Smith^{[1]}	5	0	9.2	.214	.167		1.4	.8	1.0	.0	1.4
DeShawn Stevenson	51	30	18.8	.285	.283	.563	2.0	.8	.4	.1	2.9
Gerald Wallace	16	16	35.8	.416	.385	.859	6.8	3.1	1.4	.7	15.2
Deron Williams	55	55	36.3	.407	.336	.843	3.3	8.7	1.2	.4	21.0
Jordan Williams	43	5	14.8	.507		.652	3.6	.3	.5	.3	4.6
Shawne Williams	25	6	20.6	.286	.241	.727	2.7	.6	.4	.4	4.5
Shelden Williams	58	35	22.0	.478		.731	6.0	.6	.8	.7	4.6

- ^{1} Statistics with the New Jersey Nets.

== Awards, records and milestones ==
- Deron Williams was selected for the 2012 NBA All-Star Game. It was his third appearance.
- On March 4, Deron Williams set a new franchise record for points scored in a game with 57 in a 104–101 win against the Charlotte Bobcats.

== Injuries ==
- Brook Lopez had a fracture in his right foot during the pre-season that required surgery and ended up missing the first 32 games of the regular season. He returned on February 19, 2012, and played five games before twisting his right ankle, an injury that ultimately aggravated the previous one sustained before the regular season. The Nets decided to place him on the injured list for the remainder of the season.
- Shawne Williams had surgery on February to remove bone fragments from his left foot and missed the remainder of the season.
- On February 8, Keith Bogans fractured his left ankle and tore his deltoid ligament in a game against the Detroit Pistons and missed the remainder of the season.
- Damion James had surgery on his right foot and was out for the season after playing in seven games.

== Transactions ==
=== Overview ===
Players Added

Via draft

- MarShon Brooks
- Jordan Williams

Via free agency

- Keith Bogans
- Gerald Green
- Dennis Horner
- Larry Owens
- DeShawn Stevenson
- Shelden Williams
- Shawne Williams

Via trade

- Mehmet Okur
- Gerald Wallace

10-day contracts

- Andre Emmett
- Armon Johnson
- Jerry Smith
Players Lost

Via trade

- Mehmet Okur
- Shawne Williams

Via free agency

- Mario West
- Brandan Wright
- Sasha Vujačić

Waived

- Keith Bogans
- Stephen Graham
- Dennis Horner
- Larry Owens
- Travis Outlaw
- Ben Uzoh

=== Trades ===
June 23, 2011	To New Jersey Nets Draft rights to Bojan Bogdanović	To Minnesota Timberwolves 2013 second-round pick Cash considerations
June 23, 2011	To New Jersey Nets Draft rights to MarShon Brooks	To Boston Celtics Draft rights to JaJuan Johnson; 2014 second-round pick
December 22, 2011	To New Jersey Nets Mehmet Okur	To Utah Jazz Future second-round pick
March 15, 2012	To New Jersey Nets Gerald Wallace	To Portland Trail Blazers Mehmet Okur; Shawne Williams; Conditional 2013 second-round pick

=== Free agents ===
Additions
Player	Date signed	Former team
Dennis Horner	December 9	Springfield Armor (D-League)
Shelden Williams	December 13	New York Knicks
Shawne Williams	December 16	New York Knicks
Kris Humphries	December 21	Re-signed
DeShawn Stevenson	December 23	Dallas Mavericks
Larry Owens	January 18	Tulsa 66ers (D-League)
Keith Bogans	January 31	Chicago Bulls
Gerald Green	March 18	After signing two 10-day contracts

Subtractions
Player	Date signed	New team
Sasha Vujačić	July 15	Anadolu Efes (Turkey)
Mario West	August 2	Tezenis Verona (Italy)
Brandan Wright	December 9	Dallas Mavericks
Ben Uzoh	December 19	Charlotte Bobcats

Many players signed with teams from other leagues due to the 2011 NBA lockout. FIBA allows players under NBA contracts to sign and play for teams from other leagues if the contracts have opt-out clauses that allow the players to return to the NBA if the lockout ends. The Chinese Basketball Association, however, only allows its clubs to sign foreign free agents who could play for at least the entire season.

Played in other leagues during lockout
Player	Date signed	New team	Opt-out clause
Deron Williams	July 16	Beşiktaş Milangaz (Turkey)	Yes
Jordan Farmar	August 3	Maccabi Tel Aviv (Israel)	Yes
Ben Uzoh	October 1	Lokomotiv-Kuban (Russia)	No
Dan Gadzuric	October 4	Jiangsu Dragons (China)	No
Jordan Williams	November 20	Zastal Zielona Góra (Poland)	Yes

== See also ==
- 2011–12 NBA season
