= Keith Bogans =

American basketball player (born 1980)

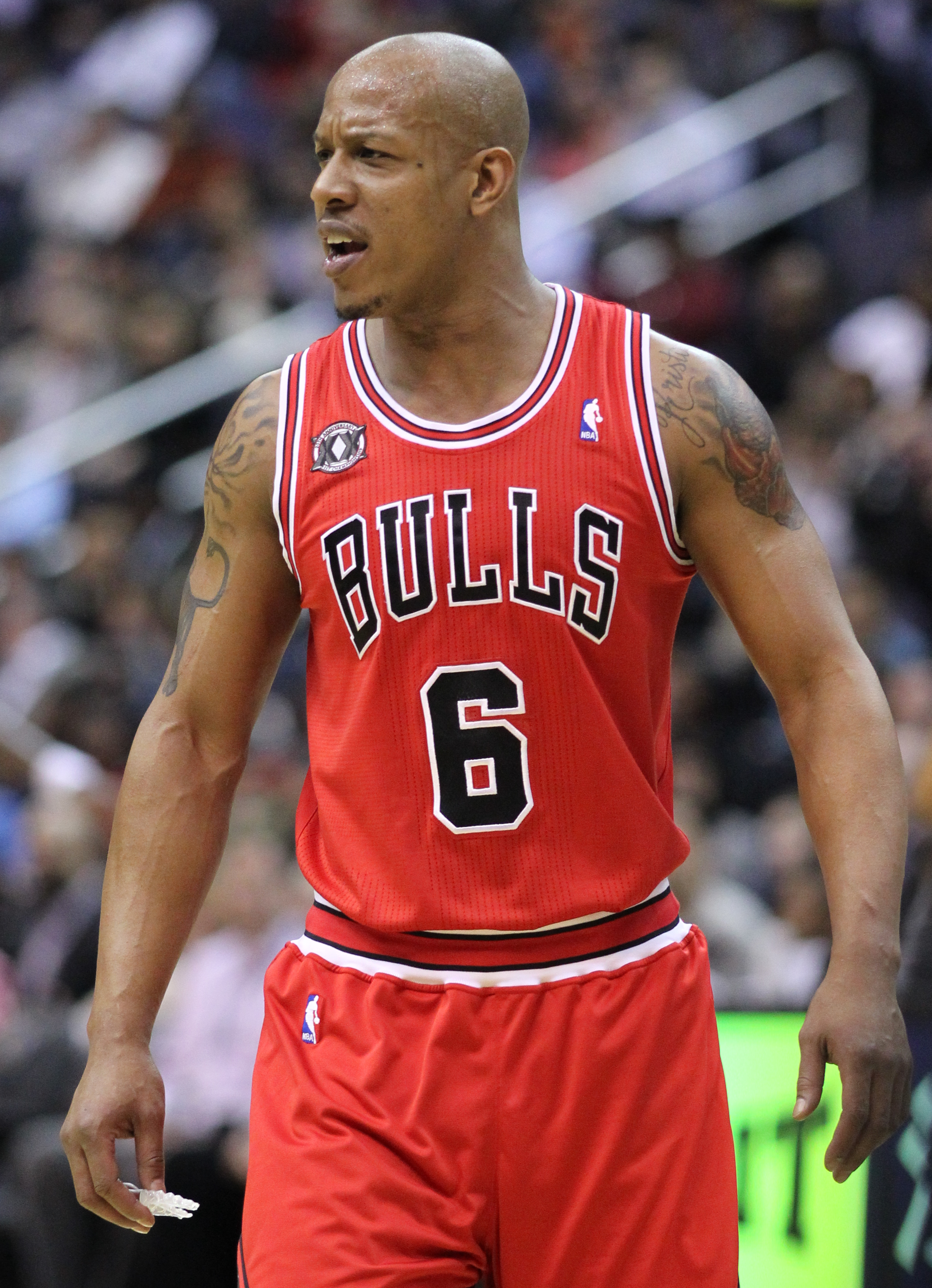
- Bogans with the Chicago Bulls in 2011

Personal information
- Born: May 12, 1980 (age 46) Washington, D.C., U.S.
- Listed height: 6 ft 5 in (1.96 m)
- Listed weight: 215 lb (98 kg)

Career information
- High school: DeMatha Catholic (Hyattsville, Maryland)
- College: Kentucky (1999–2003)
- NBA draft: 2003: 2nd round, 43rd overall pick
- Drafted by: Milwaukee Bucks
- Playing career: 2003–2016
- Position: Shooting guard / small forward
- Number: 3, 10, 6, 4
- Coaching career: 2017–2020

Career history

Playing
- 2003–2004: Orlando Magic
- 2004–2006: Charlotte Bobcats
- 2006: Houston Rockets
- 2006–2009: Orlando Magic
- 2009: Milwaukee Bucks
- 2009–2010: San Antonio Spurs
- 2010–2011: Chicago Bulls
- 2012–2013: New Jersey / Brooklyn Nets
- 2013–2014: Boston Celtics
- 2016: Westchester Knicks

Career highlights
- Second-team All-American – NABC (2003); Third-team All-American – AP, TSN (2003); SEC Player of the Year – Coaches (2003); First-team All-SEC (2003); Second-team All-SEC (2001); McDonald's All-American (1999); First-team Parade All-American (1999); Second-team Parade All-American (1998)
- Stats at NBA.com
- Stats at Basketball Reference

Keith Ramon Bogans (born May 12, 1980) is an American former basketball player who last served as an assistant coach for the New York Knicks of the National Basketball Association (NBA). He played college basketball for the Kentucky Wildcats.

== School and college career ==
Bogans attended The Langley School in McLean, Virginia and DeMatha Catholic High School in Hyattsville, Maryland, and was an All-American first team honoree in his senior year. He was coached by Morgan Wootten, leading DeMatha to a 34–1 record and a number three national ranking in 1999. He was recruited by the University of Kentucky, and was a four-year starter for the Wildcats under coach Tubby Smith. In his senior year at UK, he led the 2002–03 Wildcats to a 16–0 sweep of the Southeastern Conference and the SEC Tournament title, finishing with an Elite Eight run in the NCAA Tournament. He was an All-American as a college senior when he averaged 15.7 points, 3.8 rebounds, 2.7 assists, and 1.2 steals. He was also 80-for-209 from three-point range. His illustrious collegiate career ended as he limped off the court at the Hubert H. Humphrey Metrodome, after playing the game on a severely sprained ankle. The Wildcats ended up losing to Dwyane Wade's Marquette squad in the Elite 8.

On September 26, 2014, Bogans was inducted into the University of Kentucky Athletics Hall of Fame.

== Professional career ==
=== Orlando Magic ===
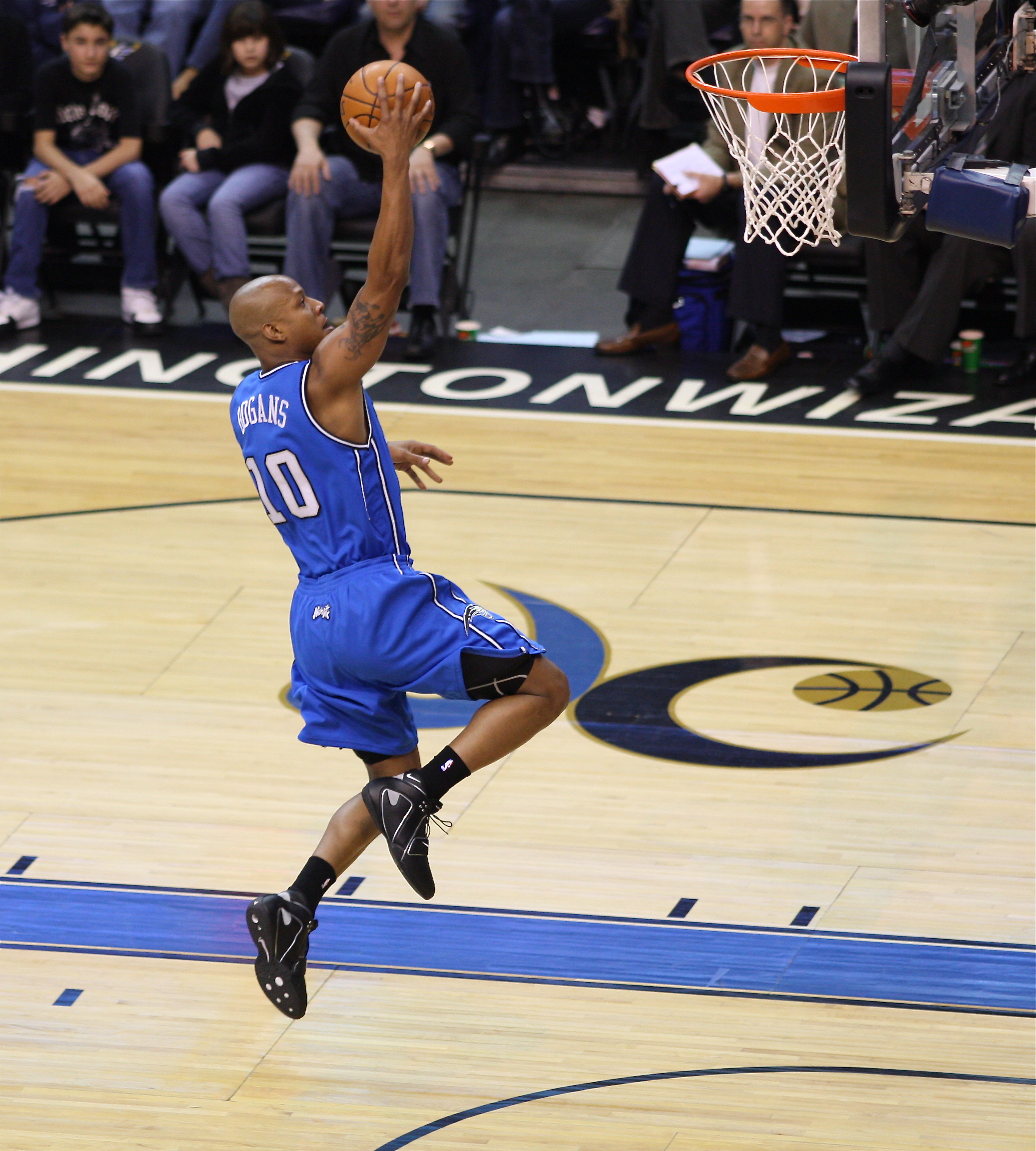
Bogans with the Magic, March 2008

Bogans was chosen in the second round with the 43rd pick in the 2003 NBA draft by the Milwaukee Bucks, but was traded to the Orlando Magic on draft day. Bogans started in half of the games he played in his rookie season, averaging 6.8 points, 4.3 rebounds and 2.9 assists per game.

=== Charlotte Bobcats ===
The Magic traded Bogans to the Charlotte Bobcats in exchange for Brandon Hunter on November 1, 2004. Bogans continued his development as a player for the Bobcats in the 2004–05 season, starting in 42 of his 76 games and averaging 9.6 points per game.

=== Houston Rockets ===
On February 9, 2006, Bogans was traded to the Rockets for Lonny Baxter. Chuck Hayes and Gerald Fitch, Bogans' former teammates at the University of Kentucky, along with himself, were all at one point members of the Rockets (although Fitch never actually played as he was released).

=== Second stint with Orlando ===
Bogans re-signed with the Magic in July 2006 as a free-agent.

On November 22, 2008, Bogans, starting his first game of 2008–09 season, broke his thumb on his non-shooting hand in a game against the Houston Rockets. He was expected to miss 4–6 weeks. However, he had the cast on his thumb removed on December 3 and returned two days later on December 5 against the Oklahoma City Thunder, scoring 9 points in 26 minutes.

=== Milwaukee Bucks ===
On February 5, 2009, Bogans was traded to the Milwaukee Bucks, the team who initially drafted him, for guard Tyronn Lue and cash. Bogans played only 29 games for the Bucks before leaving. In those 29 games Bogans averaged 6.0 points per game.

=== San Antonio Spurs ===
Bogans signed with the San Antonio Spurs in September 2009. During the 2009–10 regular season with the Spurs, Bogans scored a season-high of 17 points against the Minnesota Timberwolves on April 13, 2010. Bogans only played one season with the Spurs. He played 79 games and started in 50 games.

=== Chicago Bulls ===
Bogans signed with the Chicago Bulls on August 11, 2010. During the 2010–11 regular season, Bogans was a starter for the Bulls, and averaged 4.4 points, 1.8 rebounds, and 1.2 assists in 82 games. Though his statistics were considered modest for a starter, coach Tom Thibodeau praised Bogans' defense, saying "If he's guarding you, you know he's guarding you. He's going to make you work. He's a physical player." Bogans said about his offense that people "need to understand that's not why I'm here. I'm on the floor with Luol Deng, Derrick Rose, Carlos Boozer... there aren't a lot of shots for me and [reserve center] Kurt Thomas."

On March 15, 2011, Bogans scored a season-high 17 points in a win against the Washington Wizards to help the Bulls secure the top-seed of the Eastern Conference.

Bogans also scored 15 points in the fifth game of the first playoff series against the Indiana Pacers where the Bulls guaranteed their pass to the second round. The Bulls made it to the Eastern Conference Finals, where they lost to the Miami Heat. Bogans played and started in all postseason games.

On December 9, 2011, facing a $1.73 million option for 2011–12, the Bulls called Bogans off the court minutes before the first practice of the NBA season. The Bulls decided to hold out as long as they could regarding their decision on Bogans' contract, because they were waiting to see how the rest of the market for shooting guards was. On December 16, 2011, Bogans was waived by the Bulls.

=== New Jersey / Brooklyn Nets ===
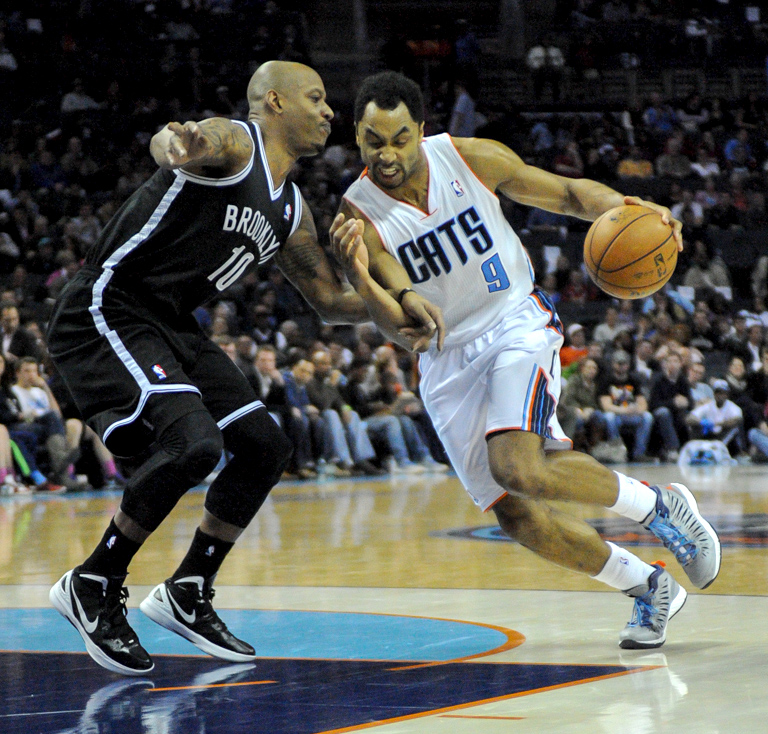
Bogans (left) defending Gerald Henderson, 2013

On February 1, 2012, Bogans signed with the New Jersey Nets. Bogans was injured contesting a dunk by Detroit Pistons forward Greg Monroe on February 8, 2012, tearing a deltoid ligament. He was waived by the team on February 14, 2012, after playing five games.

On July 19, 2012, he re-signed with the Nets for the 2012–13 season. Bogans played in 74 games in 2012–13, starting in 23 of them. He averaged 4.2 points per game.

=== Boston Celtics ===
On July 12, 2013, Bogans was signed and traded to the Boston Celtics as part of a blockbuster deal that sent Celtics stars Kevin Garnett, Paul Pierce, and Jason Terry to the Nets.

Bogans' final NBA game was played on January 7, 2014, in a 98 - 129 loss to the Denver Nuggets where he recorded 9 points, 1 assist and 1 rebound. On January 14, 2014, he was excused from the team indefinitely for personal reasons.

=== Philadelphia 76ers ===
On September 25, 2014, Bogans was traded, along with two future second-round picks, to the Cleveland Cavaliers in exchange for John Lucas III, Erik Murphy, Dwight Powell, Malcolm Thomas and the Cavaliers' 2016 and 2017 second-round picks. On September 27, he was traded to the Philadelphia 76ers, along with a 2018 second-round pick, in exchange for a 2015 protected second-round pick. On October 7, 2014, he was waived by the 76ers before ever playing for the team.

In July 2015, Bogans joined the Portland Trail Blazers for the 2015 NBA Summer League. At age 35, he was the oldest player at the tournament, but he averaged just 0.5 points, 2.8 rebounds and 1.5 assists in four games.

=== Westchester Knicks ===
On January 29, 2016, Bogans was acquired by the Westchester Knicks of the NBA Development League. He made his debut for Westchester later that night in a 128–117 loss to the Sioux Falls Skyforce, recording two rebounds in 12 minutes.

== Coaching career ==
On October 23, 2017, he was hired by the Westchester Knicks to be an assistant coach. Upon the firing of head coach David Fizdale on December 6, 2019, Bogans was promoted to the New York Knicks to serve as an assistant coach to interim head coach Mike Miller. In September 2022 he was hired by the Detroit Pistons as a player-development assistant coach.

== Awards ==
- 2002–03 Third Team All-American by Associated Press
- 2002–03 SEC Player of the Year by coaches
- 2002–03 All-SEC First Team
- 2002–03 SEC Tournament MVP
- 2000–01 Second Team All-SEC by Associated Press
- 2000–01 Second Team All-SEC by coaches
- 2000–01 SEC Tournament MVP
- 2000–01 SEC All-Tournament Team
- 1999–00 All-SEC Freshman Team
- 1998–99 McDonald's All-American
- 1998–99 Parade All-American

== NBA career statistics ==
Legend
GP	Games played	GS	Games started	MPG	Minutes per game
FG%	Field goal percentage	3P%	3-point field goal percentage	FT%	Free throw percentage
RPG	Rebounds per game	APG	Assists per game	SPG	Steals per game
BPG	Blocks per game	PPG	Points per game	**Bold**	Career high
*	Led the league

=== Regular season ===
Year	Team	GP	GS	MPG	FG%	3P%	FT%	RPG	APG	SPG	BPG	PPG
2003–04	Orlando	73	36	24.5	.403	.358	.631	4.3	1.3	.6	.1	6.8
2004–05	Charlotte	74	42	24.2	.381	.329	.727	3.1	1.8	.9	.1	**9.6**
2005–06	Charlotte	39	9	21.7	.396	.337	.762	2.7	1.2	**1.0**	.1	8.7
2005–06	Houston	33	22	**32.2**	.395	.314	.580	**4.5**	**2.5**	**1.0**	**.2**	8.5
2006–07	Orlando	59	18	16.8	.404	.387	.746	1.6	1.0	.5	.0	5.1
2007–08	Orlando	**82***	35	26.8	.410	.362	.736	3.2	1.3	.7	.1	8.7
2008–09	Orlando	36	15	21.9	.360	.333	.875	3.1	.9	.6	.1	5.3
2008–09	Milwaukee	29	0	16.7	.376	.348	.939	3.1	1.1	.7	.1	6.0
2009–10	San Antonio	79	50	19.7	.403	.357	.740	2.2	1.2	.6	**.2**	4.4
2010–11	Chicago	**82**	**82***	17.8	.404	.380	.660	1.8	1.2	.5	.1	4.4
2011–12	New Jersey	5	1	18.8	.381	.250	.400	2.2	.6	.4	.0	4.2
2012–13	Brooklyn	74	23	19.0	.380	.343	.647	1.6	1.0	.4	.1	4.2
2013–14	Boston	6	0	9.2	**.500**	**.500**	**1.000**	.5	.5	.2	.0	2.0
Career		671	333	21.6	.394	.353	.716	2.7	1.3	.6	.1	6.3

=== Playoffs ===
Year	Team	GP	GS	MPG	FG%	3P%	FT%	RPG	APG	SPG	BPG	PPG
2008	Orlando	10	0	**29.3**	.368	.333	**.727**	**4.2**	**1.1**	.4	.0	**7.3**
2010	San Antonio	8	0	6.9	.200	.167	.000	.8	.3	.3	.1	.6
2011	Chicago	**16**	**16**	19.2	**.406**	**.424**	.250	1.3	.8	**.6**	**.2**	5.1
2013	Brooklyn	2	0	11.5	.000	.000	.000	1.0	1.0	.0	.0	.0
Career		36	16	18.8	.372	.369	.600	1.9	.8	.4	.1	4.4
