= Gerald Wallace =

American basketball player (born 1982)

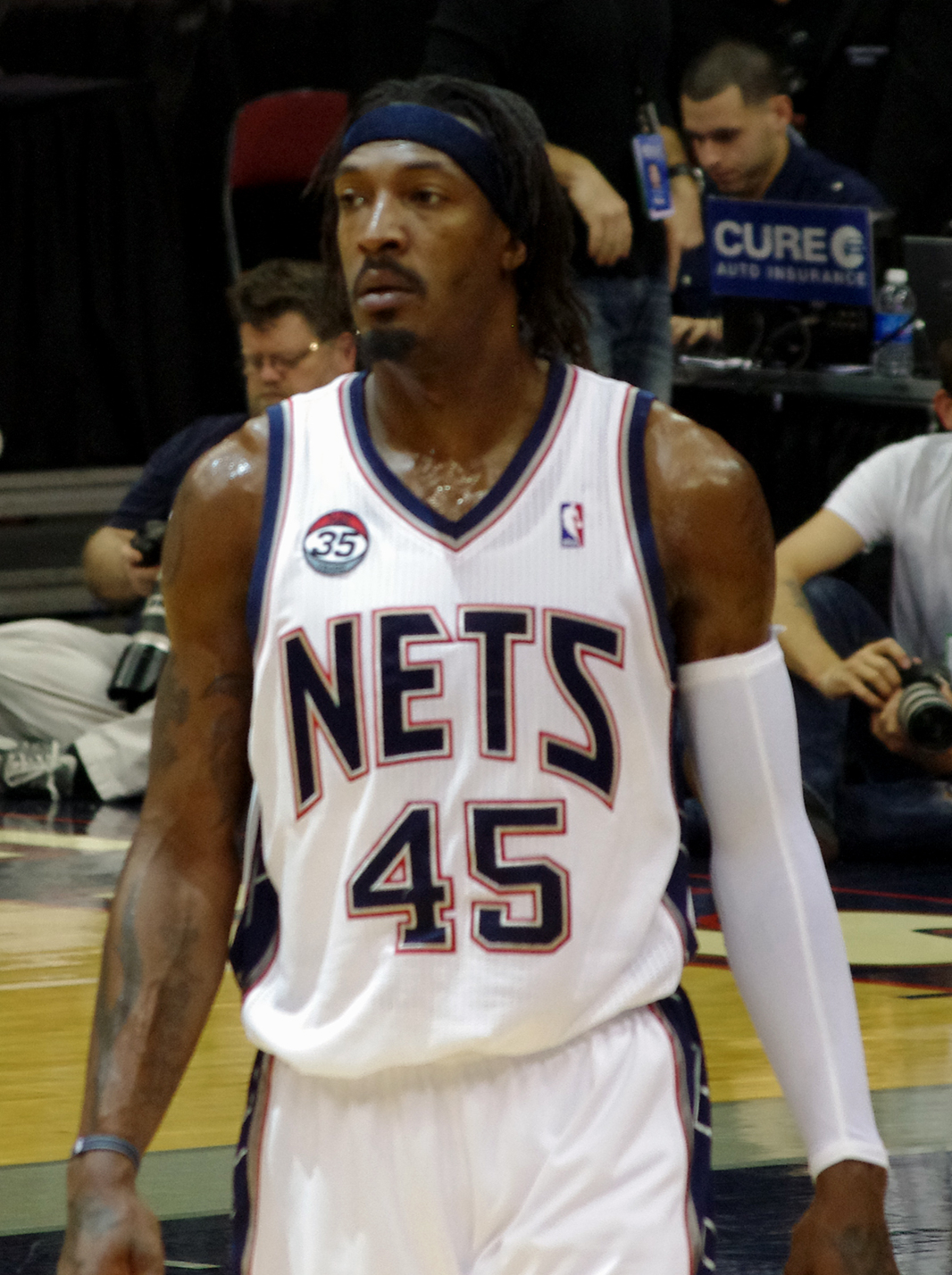
- Wallace with the New Jersey Nets in 2012

Personal information
- Born: July 23, 1982 (age 44) Sylacauga, Alabama, U.S.
- Listed height: 6 ft 7 in (2.01 m)
- Listed weight: 220 lb (100 kg)

Career information
- High school: Childersburg (Childersburg, Alabama)
- College: Alabama (2000–2001)
- NBA draft: 2001: 1st round, 25th overall pick
- Drafted by: Sacramento Kings
- Playing career: 2001–2015
- Position: Small forward
- Number: 45, 3

Career history
- 2001–2004: Sacramento Kings
- 2004–2011: Charlotte Bobcats
- 2011–2012: Portland Trail Blazers
- 2012–2013: New Jersey / Brooklyn Nets
- 2013–2015: Boston Celtics

Career highlights
- NBA All-Star (2010); NBA All-Defensive First Team (2010); NBA steals leader (2006); Naismith Prep Player of the Year (2000); USA Today High School Player of the Year (2000); McDonald's All-American (2000); First-team Parade All-American (2000); Alabama Mr. Basketball (2000)

Career statistics
- Points: 9,933 (11.9 ppg)
- Rebounds: 4,838 (5.8 rpg)
- Assists: 1,725 (2.1 apg)
- Stats at NBA.com
- Stats at Basketball Reference

Gerald Jermaine Wallace (born July 23, 1982) is an American former professional basketball player. Nicknamed "Crash", he was named an NBA All-Star and voted to the NBA All-Defensive First Team while with the Charlotte Bobcats in 2010. He played college basketball for the Alabama Crimson Tide.

== High school and college career ==
Wallace attended Childersburg High School in Childersburg, Alabama, where he had a very successful career. For his senior season efforts, he was named the Naismith Prep Player of the Year, an honor given to the best high school basketball player.

Wallace attended the University of Alabama for one season before declaring himself eligible for the 2001 NBA draft. Wallace was drafted in the first round as the 25th overall pick. In 2000–01, he averaged 9.8 points and 6.0 rebounds per game.

== Professional career ==
=== Sacramento Kings (2001–2004) ===
In three seasons with the Sacramento Kings, Wallace rarely played, but in his brief appearances, he made himself known for his versatility and extraordinary athleticism. In the 2002 Slam Dunk Contest, Wallace finished second to two-time winner Jason Richardson. On December 1, 2002, Wallace led Sacramento in scoring with a then-career-high 21 points, and grabbed eight rebounds, during a 103–84 win over the Houston Rockets. During his tenure with the Kings, Wallace was the odd man out in a deep roster that included All-Stars Chris Webber, Peja Stojaković, and Vlade Divac.

=== Charlotte Bobcats (2004–2011) ===
Wallace was selected by the Charlotte Bobcats as part of the 2004 NBA expansion draft. In his first season he averaged 11.1 points, 5.5 rebounds, 1.7 steals and 1.3 blocks a game. He continued to improve in 2005–06, before getting injured in January, averaging 14.5 points and 7 rebounds, and ranking in the top 10 in the NBA in field goal percentage (54.142), blocks (2.19), and steals per game (2.44). Since the NBA began counting blocks as a statistic in 1973, only two other players (David Robinson and Hakeem Olajuwon) in league history have averaged over 2.0 blocks and 2.0 steals per game in a single season.

Wallace was known for his somewhat reckless style of play that led to frequent injuries and earned him the nickname "Crash". He missed a total of 39 games in his first two years with the Bobcats, but his energetic and sometimes dangerous behavior that may have caused his injuries was also what contributed to his gaudy defensive stats. Coach Bernie Bickerstaff said of Wallace, "Gerald can only play one way and be effective. Energy – that's his game." In 2006, Wallace attempted to refine his game in order to avoid being injured, and as a result his numbers suffered. The first month of the season, Wallace had only five total blocks (an average of .3 per game) and his averages were down across the stat line from 2005. Wallace improved his play in the second month of the season, but he went down with a separated shoulder in a December game against the Indiana Pacers. When he returned, Wallace continued his fine play finishing the season averaging 18.1 points, 7.2 rebounds, 2.6 assists, 2 steals, and 1 block in 72 games.

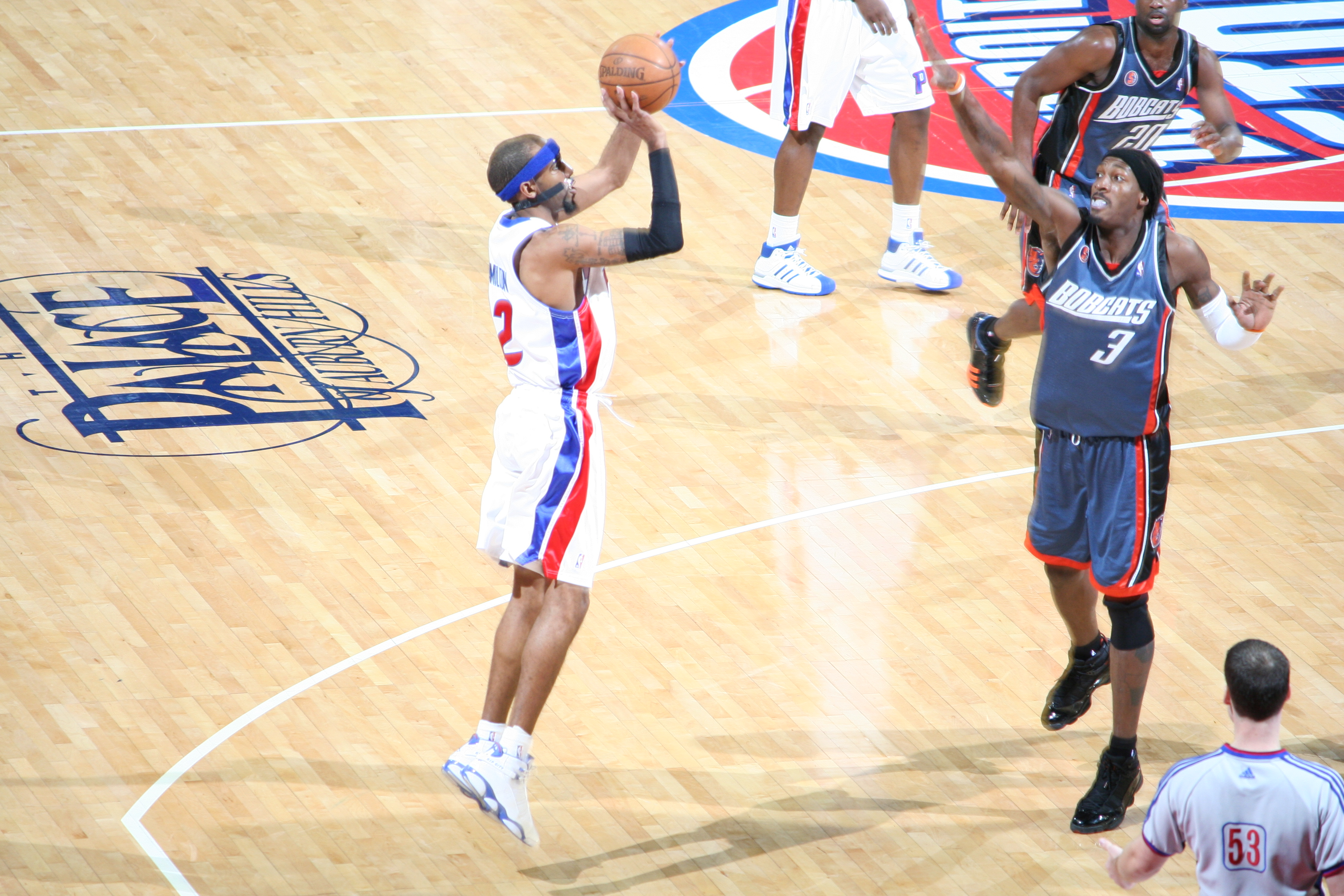
Wallace contesting Richard Hamilton's jump shot in January 2009

Wallace appeared opposite Tim Duncan in the March 2008 "SLAM-UP" centerfold for SLAM Magazine.

Wallace suffered a Grade 3 concussion on February 23, 2008, after taking an unintentional elbow to the face from Sacramento's Mikki Moore. It was his fourth concussion in as many seasons with the Bobcats. It was not clear when he would return, although Grade 3 concussions are defined by the American Association of Neurological Surgeons as ones that "involve post-traumatic amnesia for more than 24 hours or unconsciousness for more than five minutes. Players who sustain this grade of brain injury should be sidelined for at least one month, after which they can return to play if they are asymptomatic for one week." He returned later on in the season, finishing the year with a new career high in points, assists, and minutes.

He suffered a partially collapsed lung and a fractured rib after being flagrantly fouled while driving for a layup by Los Angeles Lakers' Andrew Bynum on January 27, 2009, and was forced to miss seven games. He also was unable to fly and instead crossed the United States en route back to Charlotte by bus.

Wallace was selected to play in the 2010 NBA All-Star Game in Dallas, becoming the first and only Charlotte Bobcat to do so (with the Bobcats changing their name back to their original Hornets name after reclaiming the Charlotte NBA history originally owned by the Pelicans franchise in 2014). Wallace was also selected to participate in the 2010 NBA All-Star Weekend Slam Dunk Contest. He was also selected to the 2010–2012 USA Basketball Men's National Team to represent the United States in the 2010 FIBA World Championship along with a possible trip with the team to the 2012 Olympics.

In the first-ever playoff game for the Bobcats, Wallace led the team with 25 points. This franchise playoff single game scoring record lasted until game 2 of the series, when Stephen Jackson broke the record by scoring 27 points.

In 2010, Wallace was named to the NBA All-Defensive First Team. During the 2010–2011 season as a Bobcat, he averaged 15.6 points per game, 8.2 rebounds per game, and 2.4 assists per game in 39 minutes per game. He played 48 games with the team during the season.

Wallace is one of three players in NBA history (the others being David Robinson and Hakeem Olajuwon) to average at least two steals and two blocks per game over the course of an entire season.

=== Portland Trail Blazers (2011–2012) ===
On February 24, 2011, Wallace was traded to the Portland Trail Blazers for Joel Przybilla, Dante Cunningham, Sean Marks, and two future draft picks. He provided help for the team while Brandon Roy was injured. The Trail Blazers finished 48–34, good for the playoffs. They lost in the opening round to the Dallas Mavericks in 6 games. In the next season as a Trail Blazer, Wallace averaged 13.3 points per game, 6.6 rebounds per game, and 2.7 assists per game in 35.8 minutes per game. He played 42 games with the team that season.

=== New Jersey/Brooklyn Nets (2012–2013) ===
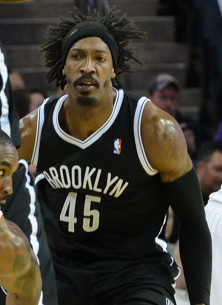
Wallace with the Nets in March 2013

On March 15, 2012, Wallace was traded from the Portland Trail Blazers to the New Jersey Nets in exchange for Shawne Williams, Mehmet Okur and a 2012 top-3 protected 1st round draft pick (which became Damian Lillard). On April 8, 2012, Wallace injured his left leg on a put back dunk and played only two more games that season. Wallace played in 16 total games for the Nets that season and averaged 15.2 points per game. On July 11, 2012, Wallace re-signed with the Nets. The contract was reportedly worth $40 million for four years. In the first game of the season Wallace injured his left ankle. With just 27 seconds left on the game clock, Wallace got hurt trying to block a shot by Raptors point guard Kyle Lowry. After the game the team announced it was a sprained left ankle. Wallace missed six games before making his return. Wallace got injured again when the Nets played the Phoenix Suns on January 11, 2013. Wallace injured his ribs after the Phoenix Suns player P. J. Tucker fouled him hard while attempting a fast break dunk early in the first quarter. Wallace landed awkwardly on the floor and remained on the court for several moments before being helped to get on his feet and to the locker room. He did not return to the game. Wallace missed two games.

=== Boston Celtics (2013–2015) ===
Wallace was traded to the Boston Celtics on July 12, 2013, in a multi-player deal that sent Kevin Garnett, Paul Pierce, and Jason Terry to the Nets.

On February 28, 2014, Wallace was ruled out for the rest of the season after an MRI revealed a torn meniscus in his left knee.

On July 27, 2015, Wallace was traded, along with Chris Babb, to the Golden State Warriors in exchange for David Lee. Four days later, Wallace was traded to the Philadelphia 76ers, along with cash and draft considerations, in exchange for Jason Thompson. On September 27, 2015, he was waived by the 76ers.

Wallace's final NBA game was Game 4 of the 2015 Eastern Conference First Round on April 26, 2015, against the Cleveland Cavaliers. Boston lost the game 93 – 101 with Wallace recording 1 rebound and no other stats in 3 and half minutes of playing time.

== NBA career statistics ==
Legend
GP	Games played	GS	Games started	MPG	Minutes per game
FG%	Field goal percentage	3P%	3-point field goal percentage	FT%	Free throw percentage
RPG	Rebounds per game	APG	Assists per game	SPG	Steals per game
BPG	Blocks per game	PPG	Points per game	**Bold**	Career high
*	Led the league

=== Regular season ===
Year	Team	GP	GS	MPG	FG%	3P%	FT%	RPG	APG	SPG	BPG	PPG
2001–02	Sacramento	54	1	8.0	.429	.000	.500	1.7	.5	.4	.1	3.2
2002–03	Sacramento	47	7	12.1	.492	.250	.527	2.7	.5	.5	.3	4.7
2003–04	Sacramento	37	1	9.1	.360	.000	.458	2.0	.5	.4	.4	2.0
2004–05	Charlotte	70	68	30.7	.449	.274	.661	5.5	2.0	1.7	1.3	11.1
2005–06	Charlotte	55	52	34.5	**.538**	.280	.614	7.5	1.6	**2.5***	**2.1**	15.2
2006–07	Charlotte	72	71	36.7	.502	.325	.691	7.2	2.6	2.0	1.0	18.1
2007–08	Charlotte	62	59	38.3	.449	.321	.731	6.0	**3.5**	2.1	.9	**19.4**
2008–09	Charlotte	71	71	37.6	.480	.298	.804	7.8	2.7	1.7	.9	16.6
2009–10	Charlotte	**76**	**76**	**41.0**	.484	.371	.776	**10.0**	2.1	1.5	1.1	18.2
2010–11	Charlotte	48	48	39.0	.433	.330	.739	8.2	2.4	1.2	1.0	15.6
2010–11	Portland	23	15	35.7	.498	.338	.767	7.6	2.5	2.0	.7	15.8
2011–12	Portland	42	42	35.8	.472	.265	.776	6.6	2.7	1.5	.6	13.3
2011–12	New Jersey	16	16	35.8	.416	**.385**	**.859**	6.8	3.1	1.4	.7	15.2
2012–13	Brooklyn	69	69	30.1	.397	.282	.637	4.6	2.6	1.4	.7	7.7
2013–14	Boston	58	16	24.4	.504	.297	.465	3.7	2.5	1.3	.2	5.1
2014–15	Boston	32	0	8.9	.412	.333	.400	1.8	.3	.5	.1	1.1
Career		832	611	29.7	.469	.312	.709	5.8	2.1	1.4	.8	11.9
All-Star		1	0	15.0	.333	.000	.000	3.0	1.0	.0	.0	2.0

=== Playoffs ===
Year	Team	GP	GS	MPG	FG%	3P%	FT%	RPG	APG	SPG	BPG	PPG
2002	Sacramento	5	0	2.8	.000	.000	**1.000**	.2	.2	.0	.2	.8
2003	Sacramento	**7**	0	2.6	.400	.000	**1.000**	.7	.0	.0	.1	.9
2004	Sacramento	3	0	6.7	**.500**	.000	.500	.7	.3	.3	.3	2.3
2010	Charlotte	4	4	**41.0**	.477	**.455**	.657	9.0	2.3	**1.3**	**1.5**	**17.5**
2011	Portland	6	6	37.7	.448	.176	.875	**9.2**	**2.8**	**1.3**	.5	15.2
2013	Brooklyn	7	**7**	34.7	.463	.379	.550	4.0	2.4	1.1	.7	12.0
2015	Boston	1	0	4.0	.000	.000	.000	1.0	.0	.0	.0	.0
Career		33	17	20.9	.455	.333	.726	3.9	1.4	.7	.5	7.9

== Personal life ==
Wallace started The Gerald Wallace Foundation to provide opportunities for underserved children and their families in his hometown of Childersburg, Alabama, and his former playing city of Portland, Oregon.
