= New Orleans Pelicans all-time roster =

The following is a list of players, both past and current, who appeared at least in one game for the New Orleans Hornets/New Orleans Pelicans NBA franchise.

== Players ==
Note: Statistics are correct through the end of the 2025–26 season.

G	Guard	G/F	Guard-forward	F	Forward	F/C	Forward-center	C	Center

legend
*	Denotes player who has been selected for at least one All-Star Game with the New Orleans Pelicans and is currently on the team roster
^{+}	Denotes player who has been selected for at least one All-Star Game with the New Orleans Pelicans
^{x}	Denotes player who is currently on the New Orleans Pelicans roster
0.0	Denotes the New Orleans Pelicans statistics leader (min. 100 games played for the team for per-game statistics)

=== A to B ===
All-time roster
Player	Pos.	Pre-draft team	Yrs	Seasons	Statistics									Ref.
Player	Pos.	Pre-draft team	Yrs	Seasons	GP	MP	REB	AST	PTS	MPG	RPG	APG	PPG	Ref.
Steven Adams	C	Pittsburgh	1	2020–2021	58	1,605	514	111	438	27.7	8.9	1.9	7.6	
Alexis Ajinça	F/C	(France) Hyères-Toulon	4	2013–2017	222	3,353	1,038	130	1,330	15.1	4.7	0.6	6.0	
Courtney Alexander	G	Fresno State	1	2002–2003	66	1,360	118	79	523	20.6	1.8	1.2	7.9	
Trey Alexander^{x}	G	Creighton	1	2025–2026	9	111	11	9	47	12.3	1.2	1.0	5.2	
Nickeil Alexander-Walker	G	Virginia Tech	3	2019–2022	143	2,915	392	330	1,414	20.4	2.7	2.3	9.9	
Tony Allen	G/F	Oklahoma State	1	2017–2018	22	273	47	9	103	12.4	2.1	0.4	4.7	
Jose Alvarado	G	Georgia Tech	5	2021–2026	268	5,434	619	842	2,180	20.3	2.3	3.1	8.1	
Al-Farouq Aminu	F	Wake Forest	3	2011–2014	222	5,588	1,389	283	1,526	25.2	6.3	1.3	6.9	
Lou Amundson	F/C	UNLV	2	2012–2014	36	393	113	14	82	10.9	3.1	0.4	2.3	
Chris Andersen	F/C	Blinn	3	2004–2006; 2007–2008	104	2,034	574	77	680	19.6	5.5	0.7	6.5	
David Andersen	C	(Spain) FC Barcelona	1	2010–2011	29	223	50	6	78	7.7	1.7	0.2	2.7	
Kenny Anderson	G	Georgia Tech	1	2002–2003	23	446	45	77	139	19.4	2.0	3.3	6.0	
Ryan Anderson	F	California	4	2012–2016	230	6,981	1,352	242	3,702	30.4	5.9	1.1	16.1	
Trevor Ariza	F	UCLA	2	2010–2012	116	3,950	623	297	1,270	34.1	5.4	2.6	10.9	
Darrell Armstrong	G	Fayetteville State	2	2003–2005	93	2,659	274	376	982	28.6	2.9	4.0	10.6	
Hilton Armstrong	F/C	UConn	4	2006–2010	209	2,697	568	78	743	12.9	2.7	0.4	3.6	
Ömer Aşık	C	(Turkey) Fenerbahçe	4	2014–2018	189	3,763	1,362	115	929	19.9	7.2	0.6	4.9	
Stacey Augmon	G/F	UNLV	2	2002–2004	139	2,278	293	154	609	16.4	2.1	1.1	4.4	
Gustavo Ayón	C	(Spain) Fuenlabrada	1	2011–2012	54	1,088	265	74	319	20.1	4.9	1.4	5.9	
Luke Babbitt	F	Nevada	3	2013–2016	137	2,148	347	106	753	15.7	2.5	0.8	5.5	
Lonzo Ball	G	UCLA	2	2019–2021	118	3772	646	754	1,547	32.0	5.5	6.4	13.1	
Mo Bamba	C	Texas	1	2024–2025	4	61	25	2	10	15.3	6.3	0.5	2.5	
Brandon Bass	F	LSU	2	2005–2007	50	430	111	6	110	8.6	2.2	0.1	2.2	
Lonny Baxter	F	Maryland	1	2004–2005	4	36	8	0	6	9.0	2.0	0.0	1.5	
Jerryd Bayless	G	Arizona	1	2010–2011	11	149	15	28	50	13.5	1.4	2.5	4.5	
Marco Belinelli	G/F	(Italy) Fortitudo Bologna	2	2010–2012	146	3,923	323	193	1,616	26.9	2.2	1.3	11.1	
Dairis Bertāns	G	(Italy) Olimpia Milano	1	2018–2019	12	167	9	10	34	13.9	0.8	0.8	2.8	
Saddiq Bey^{x}	F	Villanova	1	2025–2026	72	2,246	400	182	1,271	31.2	5.6	2.5	17.7	
Eric Bledsoe	G	Kentucky	1	2020–2021	71	2,111	244	268	869	29.7	3.4	3.8	12.2	
Brandon Boston Jr.	G/F	Kentucky	1	2024–2025	42	993	134	92	448	23.6	3.2	2.2	10.7	
Ryan Bowen	F	Iowa	2	2007–2009	74	879	124	34	161	11.9	1.7	0.5	2.2	
Izaiah Brockington	G	Iowa State	1	2023–2024	1	3	2	0	4	3.0	2.0	0.0	4.0	
Keion Brooks Jr.	F	Washington	1	2024–2025	14	332	58	13	142	23.7	4.1	0.9	10.1	
Anthony Brown	G/F	Stanford	1	2016–2017	9	143	26	6	34	15.9	2.9	0.7	3.8	
Bobby Brown	G	Cal State Fullerton	1	2009–2010	22	328	18	46	145	14.9	0.8	2.1	6.6	
Devin Brown	G	UTSA	3	2006–2007; 2008–2010	160	3,498	479	261	1,377	21.9	3.0	1.6	8.6	
Bruce Brown	G	Miami (FL)	1	2024–2025	23	569	96	56	189	24.7	4.2	2.4	8.2	
P. J. Brown	F/C	Louisiana Tech	4	2002–2006	315	10,559	2,675	570	3,231	33.5	8.5	1.8	10.3	
Tierre Brown	G	McNeese State	1	2003–2004	3	17	1	2	6	5.7	0.3	0.7	2.0	
Rasual Butler	G/F	La Salle	4	2005–2009	293	7,587	859	214	2,677	25.9	2.9	0.7	9.1	

=== C to D ===
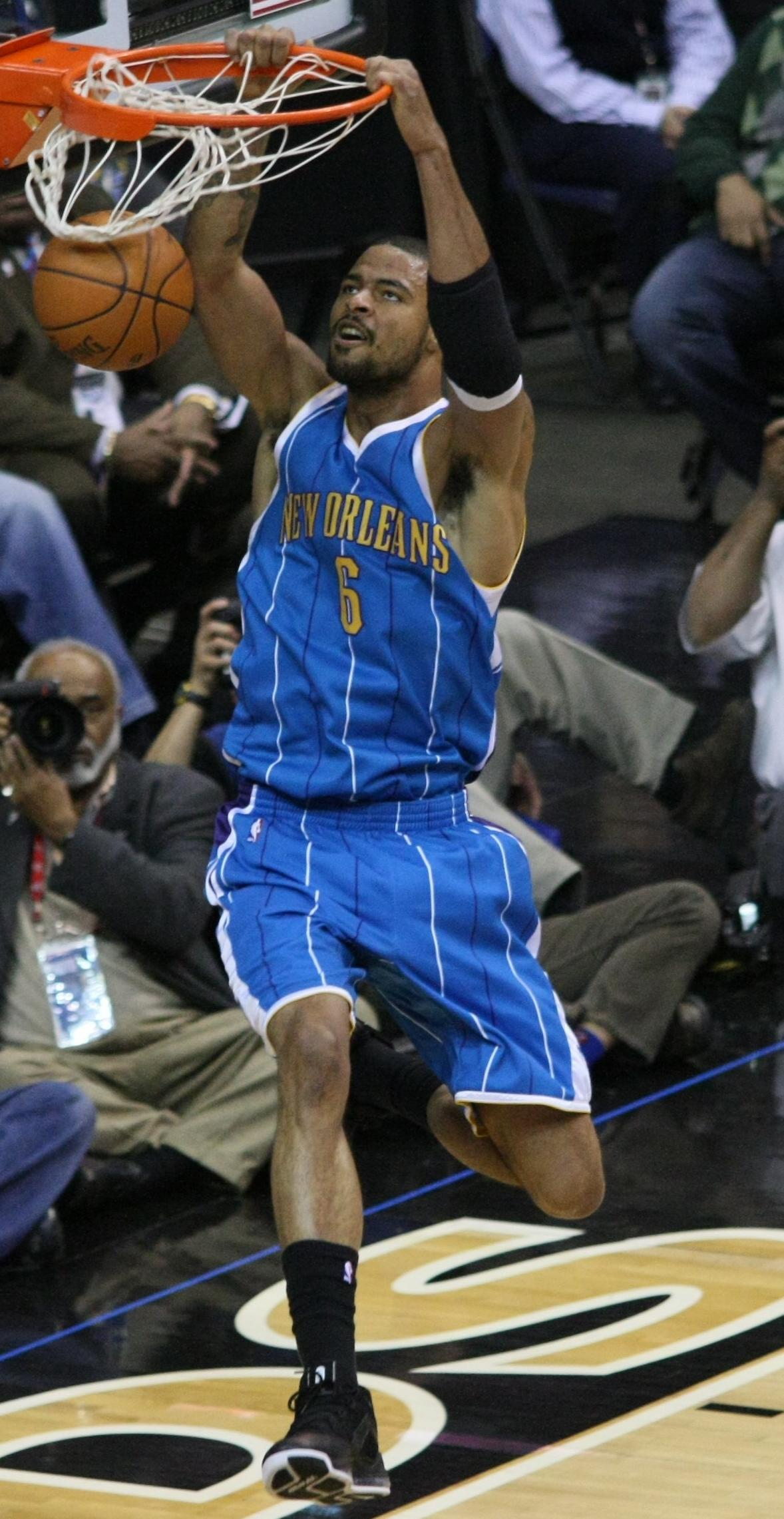
Tyson Chandler, the Pelicans rebounds-per-game leader.

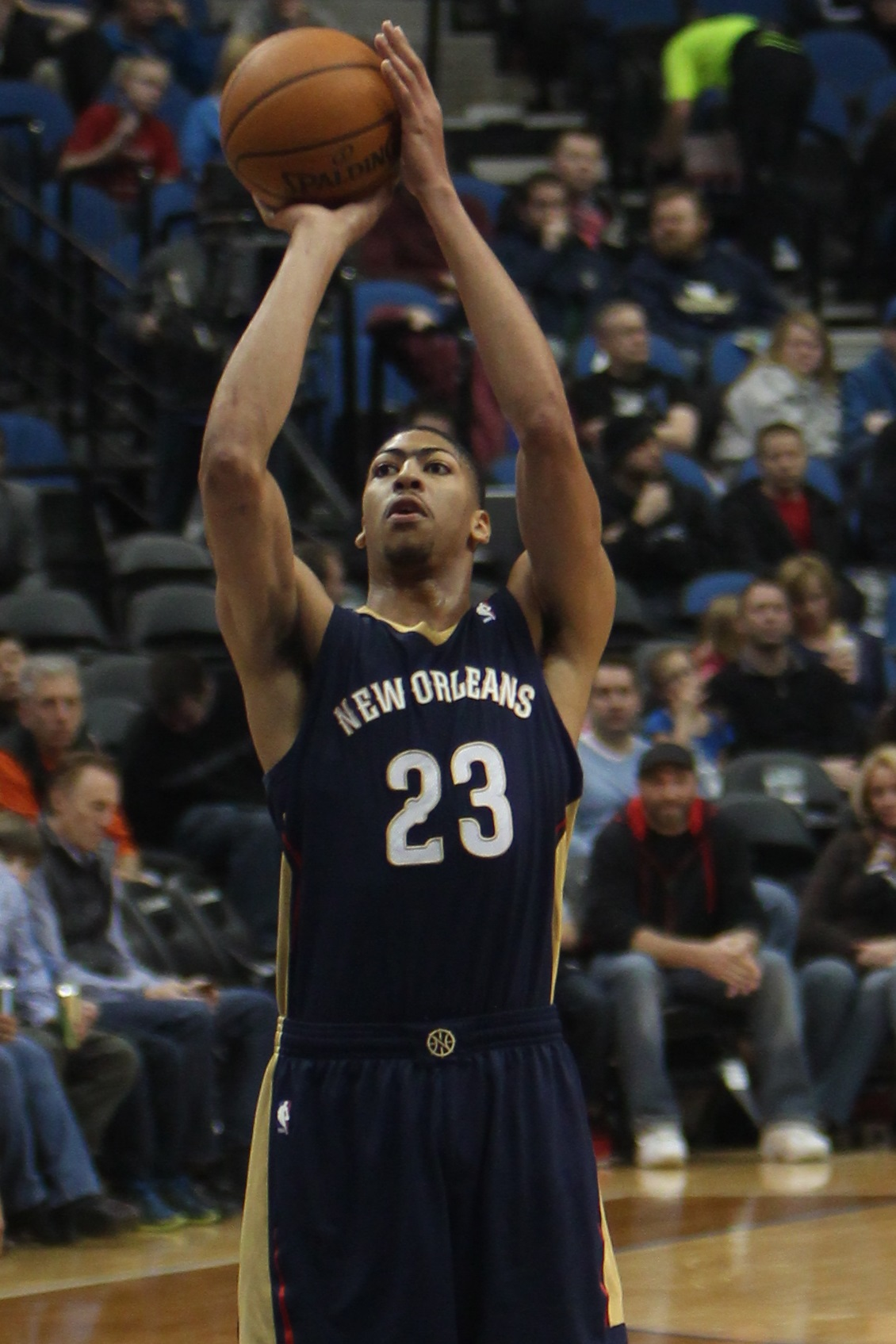
Anthony Davis, the Pelicans total rebounds and total points leader.

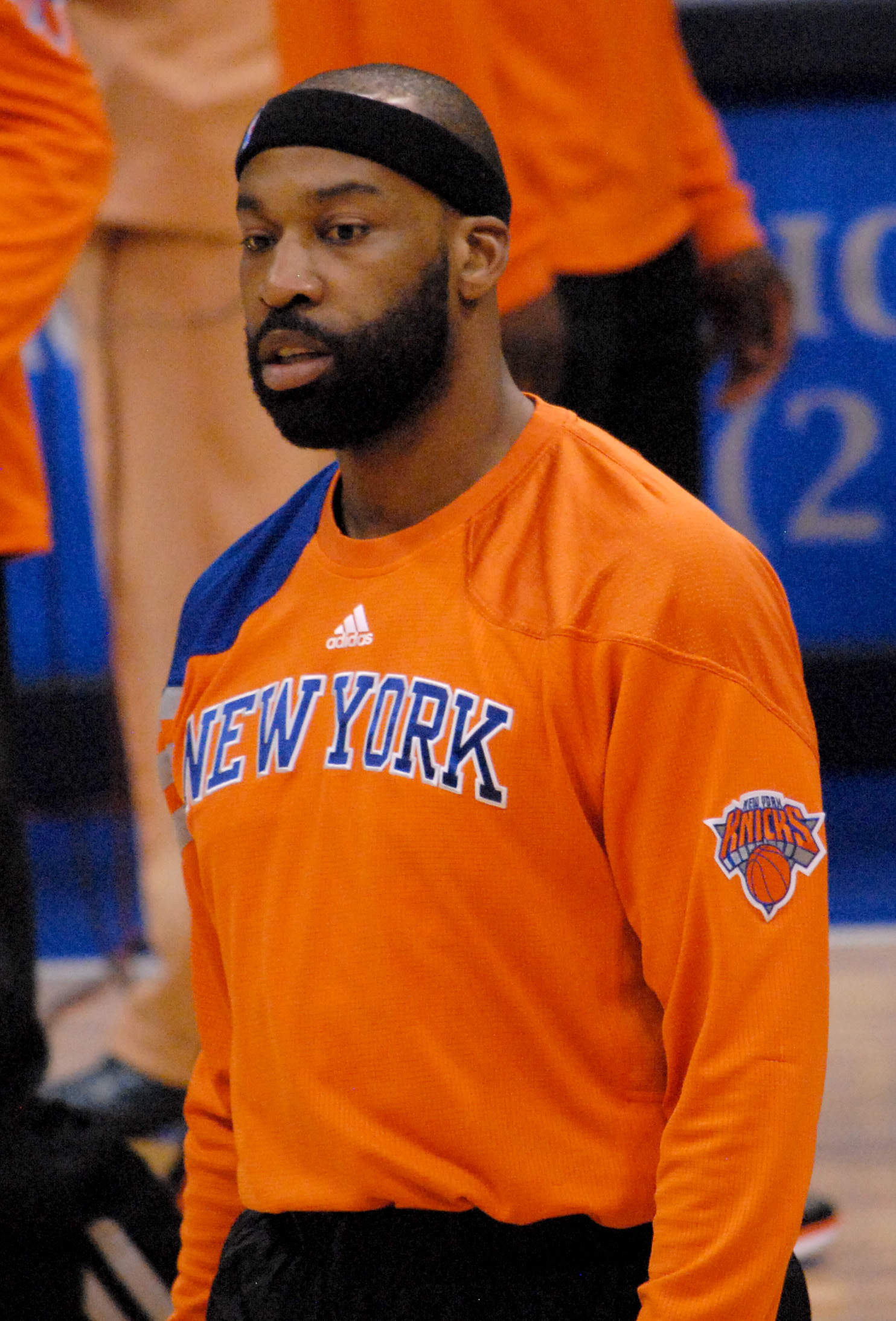
Baron Davis, was selected in 2004 NBA All-Star Game with the Pelicans.

All-time roster
Player	Pos.	Pre-draft team	Yrs	Seasons	Statistics									Ref.
Player	Pos.	Pre-draft team	Yrs	Seasons	GP	MP	REB	AST	PTS	MPG	RPG	APG	PPG	Ref.
Jamal Cain	F	Oakland	1	2024–2025	37	502	85	22	196	13.6	2.3	0.6	5.3	
Elden Campbell	C	Clemson	1	2002–2003	41	685	142	42	295	16.7	3.5	1.0	7.2	
Maurice Carter	G	LSU	1	2003–2004	6	60	8	2	20	10.0	1.3	0.3	3.3	
Omri Casspi	F	(Israel) Maccabi Tel Aviv	1	2016–2017	1	24	2	0	12	24.0	2.0	0.0	12.0	
Tyson Chandler	C	Dominguez (CA)	3	2006–2009	197	6,753	2,225	169	2,016	34.3	11.3	0.9	10.2	
Zylan Cheatham	F	Arizona State	1	2019–2020	4	51	9	3	12	12.8	2.3	0.8	3.0	
Josh Childress	G/F	Stanford	1	2013–2014	4	24	3	2	0	6.0	0.8	0.5	0.0	
Gary Clark	F	Cincinnati	1	2021–2022	38	378	90	18	101	9.9	2.4	0.5	2.7	
Ian Clark	G	Belmont	2	2017–2019	134	2,428	216	204	952	18.1	1.6	1.5	7.1	
Speedy Claxton	G	Hofstra	2	2004–2006	87	2,384	224	427	979	27.4	2.6	4.9	11.3	
Norris Cole	G	Cleveland State	2	2014–2016	73	1,881	202	257	755	25.8	2.8	3.5	10.3	
Darren Collison	G	UCLA	1	2009–2010	76	2,109	192	432	946	27.8	2.5	5.7	12.4	
Quinn Cook	G	Duke	1	2016–2017	9	111	4	14	52	12.3	0.4	1.6	5.8	
Charles Cooke	G	Dayton	1	2017–2018	13	38	2	1	6	2.9	0.2	0.1	0.5	
DeMarcus Cousins^{+}	C	Kentucky	2	2016–2018	65	2,311	828	323	1,624	35.6	12.7	5.0	25.0	
Jordan Crawford	G	Xavier	2	2016–2018	24	495	38	70	300	20.6	1.6	2.9	12.5	
Jalen Crutcher	G	Dayton	1	2023–2024	1	3	0	0	0	3.0	0.0	0.0	0.0	
Dante Cunningham	F	Villanova	4	2014–2018	263	6,387	962	190	1,512	24.3	3.7	0.7	5.7	
Antonio Daniels	G	Bowling Green	1	2008–2009	61	733	55	130	234	12.0	0.9	2.1	3.8	
Dyson Daniels	G	NBA G League Ignite	2	2022–2024	120	2,400	424	298	581	20.0	3.5	2.5	4.8	
Anthony Davis^{+}	F/C	Kentucky	7	2012–2019	466	16,108	4,906	982	11,059	34.6	10.5	2.1	23.7	
Baron Davis^{+}	G	UCLA	3	2002–2005	135	5,168	540	950	2,728	38.3	4.0	7.0	20.2	
Bryce Dejean-Jones	G	Iowa State	1	2015–2016	14	279	48	15	79	19.9	3.4	1.1	5.6	
Cheick Diallo	F	Kansas	3	2016–2019	133	1,676	616	56	728	12.6	4.6	0.4	5.5	
Dan Dickau	G	Gonzaga	1	2004–2005	67	2,074	179	346	882	31.0	2.7	5.2	13.2	
Hunter Dickinson^{x}	C	Kansas	1	2025–2026	5	42	5	2	12	8.4	1.0	0.4	2.4	
Toney Douglas	G	Florida State	2	2014–2016	73	1,439	165	181	582	19.7	2.3	2.5	8.0	
Bryce Drew	G	Valparaiso	2	2002–2004	28	157	19	24	31	5.6	0.7	0.9	1.1	
Larry Drew II	G	UCLA	1	2017–2018	7	55	2	8	15	7.9	0.3	1.1	2.1	
Jerome Dyson	G	UConn	1	2011–2012	9	180	19	18	67	20.0	2.1	2.0	7.4	

=== E to H ===
|-

All-time roster
Player	Pos.	Pre-draft team	Yrs	Seasons	Statistics									Ref.
Player	Pos.	Pre-draft team	Yrs	Seasons	GP	MP	REB	AST	PTS	MPG	RPG	APG	PPG	Ref.
Corsley Edwards	F	Central Connecticut	1	2004–2005	10	110	25	3	27	11.0	2.5	0.3	2.7	
Melvin Ely	C	Fresno State	3	2007–2009; 2013–2014	85	1,021	210	40	305	12.0	2.5	0.5	3.6	
James Ennis III	F	Long Beach State	1	2015–2016	9	282	35	18	143	31.3	3.9	2.0	15.9	
Tyreke Evans	G/F	Memphis	4	2013–2017	202	5,957	972	1,139	2,982	29.5	4.8	5.6	14.8	
Patrick Ewing Jr.	F	Georgetown	1	2010–2011	7	19	2	2	3	2.7	0.3	0.3	0.4	
Derrick Favors	C	Georgia Tech	1	2019–2020	51	1,243	501	81	459	24.4	9.8	1.6	9.0	
Jeremiah Fears^{x}	G	Oklahoma	1	2025–2026	82	2,112	300	279	1,169	25.8	3.7	3.4	14.3	
Marcus Fizer	F	Iowa State	1	2005–2006	3	39	7	1	20	13.0	2.3	0.3	6.7	
Jeff Foote	C	Cornell	1	2011–2012	4	39	6	0	4	9.8	1.5	0.0	1.0	
Tim Frazier	G	Penn State	3	2015–2017; 2018–2019	128	2,903	381	661	909	22.7	3.0	5.2	7.1	
Jimmer Fredette	G	BYU	2	2014–2016	54	522	40	59	180	9.7	0.7	1.1	3.3	
Matt Freije	F	Vanderbilt	1	2004–2005	23	441	61	20	93	19.2	2.7	0.9	4.0	
Wenyen Gabriel	F	Kentucky	1	2020–2021	21	241	54	11	72	11.5	2.5	0.5	3.4	
Langston Galloway	G	Saint Joseph's	1	2016–2017	55	1,120	121	65	471	20.4	2.2	1.2	8.6	
Alex Garcia	G	(Brazil) COC Ribeirão Preto	1	2004–2005	8	146	15	18	44	18.3	1.9	2.3	5.5	
Kaiser Gates	F	Xavier	1	2023–2024	1	7	1	0	0	7.0	1.0	0.0	0.0	
Alonzo Gee	G	Alabama	1	2015–2016	73	1,632	245	72	325	22.4	3.4	1.0	4.5	
Archie Goodwin	G	Kentucky	1	2016–2017	3	30	0	1	15	10.0	0.0	0.3	5.0	
Eric Gordon	G	Indiana	5	2011–2016	221	7,130	525	726	3,390	32.3	2.4	3.3	15.3	
Devonte' Graham	G	Kansas	2	2021–2023	129	2,973	249	432	1,182	23.0	1.9	3.3	9.2	
Aaron Gray	C	Pittsburgh	2	2009–2011	65	792	261	36	215	12.2	4.0	0.6	3.3	
Josh Gray	G	LSU	1	2019–2020	2	23	2	2	2	11.5	1.0	1.0	1.0	
Javonte Green	G/F	Radford	1	2024–2025	50	1,092	178	45	288	21.8	3.6	0.9	5.8	
Willie Green	G	Detroit Mercy	1	2010–2011	77	1,674	161	74	672	21.7	2.1	1.0	8.7	
Jordan Hamilton	G/F	Texas	1	2015–2016	11	304	62	25	125	27.6	5.6	2.3	11.4	
Jared Harper	G	Auburn	1	2021–2022	5	43	2	14	37	8.6	0.4	2.8	7.4	
Lorinza Harrington	G	Wingate	1	2004–2005	29	550	63	62	163	19.0	2.2	2.1	5.6	
Terrel Harris	G	Oklahoma State	1	2012–2013	13	108	17	7	5	8.3	1.3	0.5	0.4	
Andrew Harrison	G	Kentucky	1	2018–2019	6	38	5	7	9	6.3	0.8	1.2	1.5	
Jason Hart	G	Syracuse	1	2009–2010	4	17	2	5	2	4.3	0.5	1.3	0.5	
Josh Hart	F	Villanova	3	2019–2022	153	4,478	1,120	385	1,638	29.3	7.3	2.5	10.7	
Kirk Haston	F	Indiana	1	2002–2003	12	57	7	3	6	4.8	0.6	0.3	0.5	
Jordan Hawkins^{x}	G	UConn	3	2023–2026	174	3,173	394	178	1,386	18.2	2.3	1.0	8.0	
Jaxson Hayes	C	Texas	4	2019–2023	241	4,052	963	168	1,808	16.8	4.0	0.7	7.5	
Xavier Henry	G	Kansas	2	2011–2013	95	1,384	196	48	433	14.6	2.1	0.5	4.6	
Willy Hernangómez	C	(Spain) Real Madrid	3	2020–2023	135	2,143	852	146	1,080	15.9	6.3	1.1	8.0	
Buddy Hield	G	Oklahoma	1	2016–2017	57	1,161	166	77	488	20.4	2.9	1.4	8.6	
Solomon Hill	F	Arizona	3	2016–2019	136	3,439	476	218	783	25.3	3.5	1.6	5.8	
Jrue Holiday	G	UCLA	7	2013–2020	415	13,913	1,728	2,833	7,321	33.5	4.2	6.8	17.6	

=== I to L ===
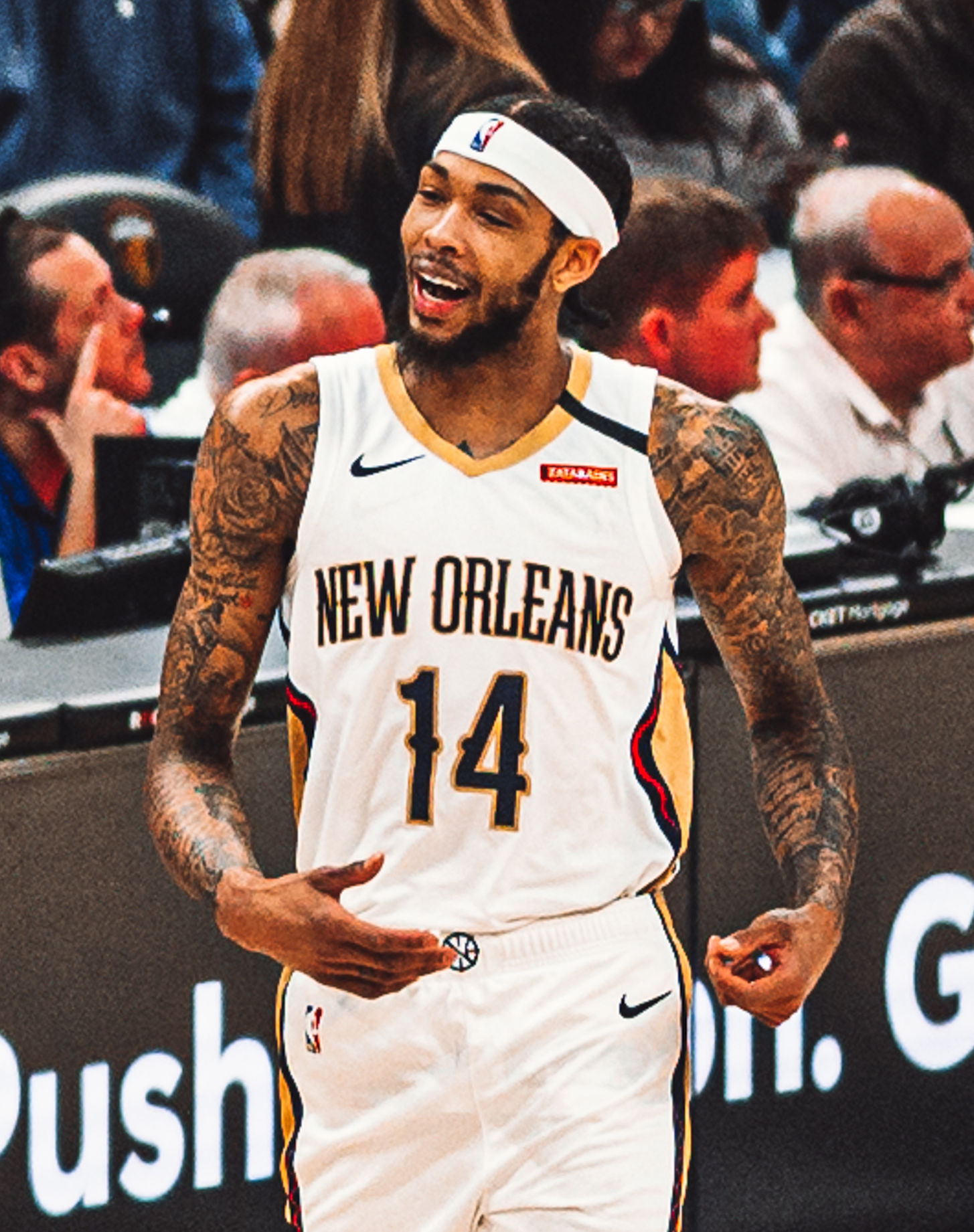
Brandon Ingram was selected to the 2020 NBA All-Star Game with the Pelicans.

All-time roster
Player	Pos.	Pre-draft team	Yrs	Seasons	Statistics									Ref.
Player	Pos.	Pre-draft team	Yrs	Seasons	GP	MP	REB	AST	PTS	MPG	RPG	APG	PPG	Ref.
Brandon Ingram^{+}	F	Duke	6	2019–2025	305	10,302	1,669	1,580	7,017	33.8	5.5	5.2	23.0	
Wes Iwundu	F	Kansas State	1	2020–2021	18	251	46	8	50	13.9	2.6	0.4	2.8	
Jarrett Jack	G	Georgia Tech	3	2010–2012; 2016–2017	117	2,938	307	473	1,301	25.1	2.6	4.0	11.1	
Bobby Jackson	G	Minnesota	2	2006–2008	102	2,221	288	217	917	21.8	2.8	2.1	9.0	
Frank Jackson	G	Duke	2	2018–2020	120	1,966	217	130	866	16.4	1.8	1.1	7.2	
Marc Jackson	C	Temple	2	2005–2007	83	1,619	320	80	653	19.5	3.9	1.0	7.9	
Casey Jacobsen	G/F	Stanford	1	2004–2005	44	1,030	100	76	335	23.4	2.3	1.7	7.6	
Mike James	G	Duquesne	2	2007–2009	29	257	24	14	77	8.9	0.8	0.5	2.7	
Mike James	G	Lamar	1	2017–2018	4	18	1	6	4	4.5	0.3	1.5	1.0	
Trey Jemison III	C	UAB	1	2024–2025	16	166	44	10	38	10.4	2.8	0.6	2.4	
Alize Johnson	F	Missouri State	1	2021–2022	4	28	13	1	9	7.0	3.3	0.3	2.3	
Carldell Johnson	G	UAB	1	2011–2012	15	119	9	22	27	7.9	0.6	1.5	1.8	
Chris Johnson	C	LSU	1	2011–2012	7	82	22	1	23	11.7	3.1	0.1	3.3	
James Johnson	F	Wake Forest	1	2020–2021	22	539	91	48	202	24.5	4.1	2.2	9.2	
Linton Johnson	F	Tulane	2	2005–2007	81	1,209	278	30	368	14.9	3.4	0.4	4.5	
Orlando Johnson	G	UC Santa Barbara	1	2015–2016	5	54	6	2	10	10.8	1.2	0.4	2.0	
Stanley Johnson	F	Arizona	1	2018–2019	18	247	42	28	96	13.7	2.3	1.6	5.3	
Trey Johnson	G	Jackson State	1	2011–2012	11	61	12	4	21	5.5	1.1	0.4	1.9	
Wesley Johnson	G/F	Syracuse	1	2018–2019	26	377	54	16	95	14.5	2.1	0.6	3.7	
Herbert Jones^{x}	F	Alabama	5	2021–2026	296	8,843	1,105	748	2,929	29.9	3.7	2.5	9.9	
Jalen Jones	G	Texas A&M	1	2017–2018	4	19	3	0	5	4.8	0.8	0.0	1.3	
Solomon Jones	F	South Florida	1	2011–2012	11	196	41	7	61	17.8	3.7	0.6	5.5	
Terrence Jones	F	Kentucky	1	2016–2017	51	1,264	303	59	584	24.8	5.9	1.2	11.5	
DeAndre Jordan^{x}	C	Texas A&M	1	2025–2026	12	199	76	11	53	16.6	6.3	0.9	4.4	
Chris Kaman	C	Central Michigan	1	2011–2012	47	1,372	364	101	616	29.2	7.7	2.1	13.1	
Kylor Kelley	C	Oregon State	1	2024–2025	3	59	18	3	10	19.7	6.0	1.3	3.3	
Maciej Lampe	C	(Spain) Real Madrid	2	2004–2006	23	277	61	12	71	12.0	2.7	0.5	3.1	
Carl Landry	F	Purdue	2	2010–2012	64	1,601	308	51	783	25.0	4.8	0.8	12.2	
Walt Lemon Jr.	G	Bradley	1	2017–2018	5	35	2	5	17	7.0	0.4	1.0	3.4	
Kira Lewis Jr.	G	Alabama	4	2020–2024	118	1,624	157	214	642	13.8	1.3	1.8	5.4	
E. J. Liddell	F	Ohio State	1	2023–2024	8	23	5	1	4	2.9	0.6	0.1	0.5	
DeAndre Liggins	G	Kentucky	1	2017–2018	27	244	26	21	44	9.0	1.0	0.8	1.6	
Randy Livingston	G	LSU	1	2002–2003	2	12	0	1	6	6.0	0.0	0.5	3.0	
Kevon Looney^{x}	C	UCLA	1	2025–2026	21	308	118	34	59	14.7	5.6	1.6	2.8	
Robin Lopez	C	Stanford	1	2012–2013	82	2,136	462	64	929	26.0	5.6	0.8	11.3	
Didi Louzada	F	(Australia) Sydney Kings	2	2020–2022	5	63	5	4	8	12.6	1.0	0.8	1.6	
George Lynch	F	North Carolina	3	2002–2005	203	4,131	839	309	902	20.3	4.1	1.5	4.4	

=== M to N ===
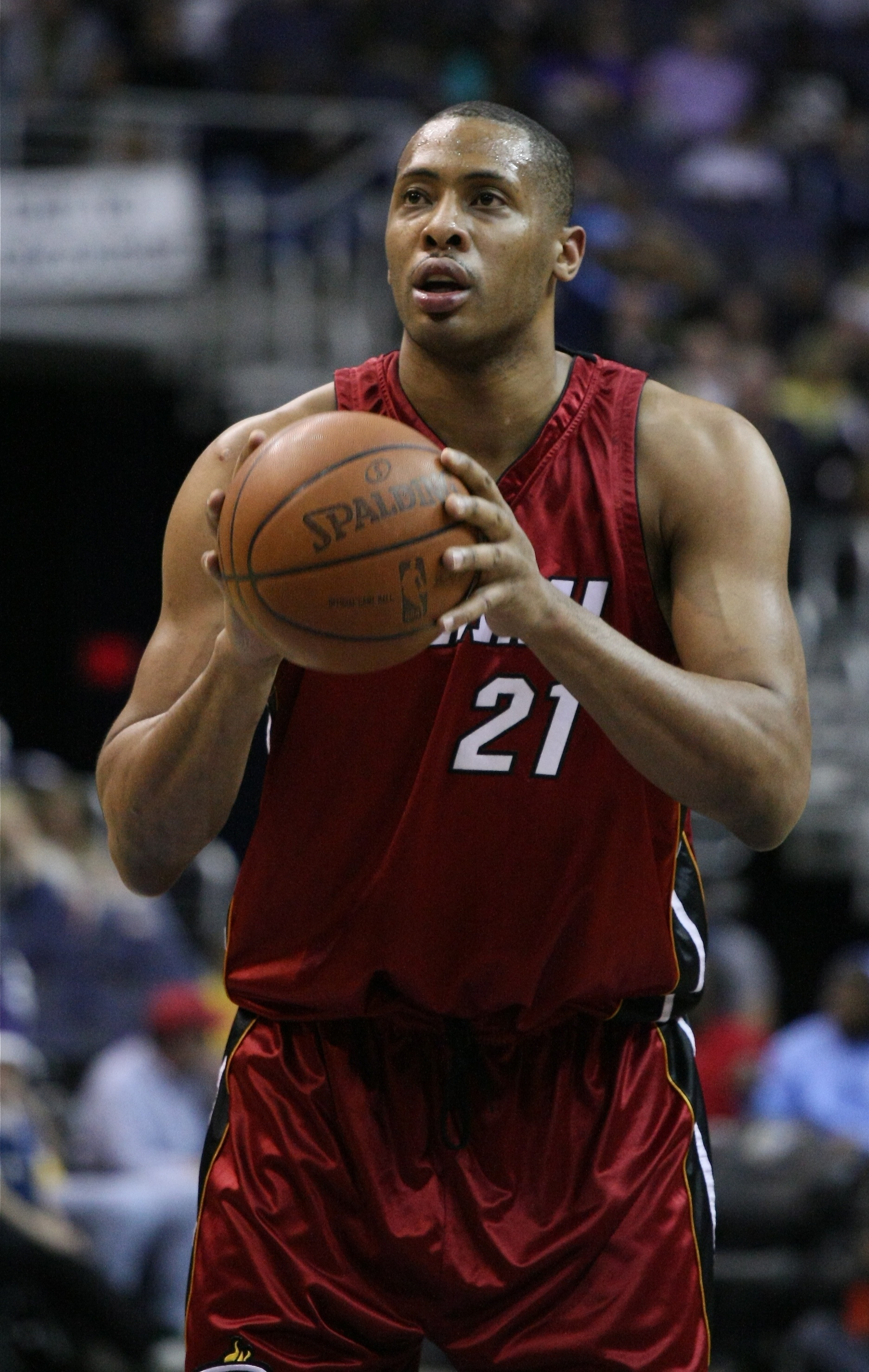
Jamaal Magloire was a 2004 All-Star with the New Orleans Hornets.

All-time roster
Player	Pos.	Pre-draft team	Yrs	Seasons	Statistics									Ref.
Player	Pos.	Pre-draft team	Yrs	Seasons	GP	MP	REB	AST	PTS	MPG	RPG	APG	PPG	Ref.
Arvydas Macijauskas	G	(Spain) Saski Baskonia	1	2005–2006	19	135	10	5	44	7.1	0.5	0.3	2.3	
Jamaal Magloire^{+}	C	Kentucky	3	2002–2005	187	5,923	1,776	203	2,230	31.7	9.5	1.1	11.9	
Will Magnay	C	Tulsa	1	2020–2021	1	3	0	0	0	3.0	0.0	0.0	0.0	
Sean Marks	F/C	California	2	2008–2010	74	913	210	16	202	12.3	2.8	0.2	2.7	
Naji Marshall	F	Xavier	4	2020–2024	230	4,484	809	467	1,723	19.5	3.5	2.0	7.5	
Jamal Mashburn^{+}	F	Kentucky	2	2002–2004	101	4,051	615	509	2,168	40.1	6.1	5.0	21.5	
Desmond Mason	F	Oklahoma State	2	2005–2007	145	4,677	643	181	1,785	32.3	4.4	1.2	12.3	
Roger Mason Jr.	G	Virginia	1	2012–2013	69	1,219	132	74	369	17.7	1.9	1.1	5.3	
Karlo Matković^{x}	F/C	(Serbia) Mega Mozzart	2	2024–2026	104	1,703	438	96	677	16.4	4.2	0.9	6.5	
D. J. Mbenga	C	(Belgium) Spirou Charleroi	1	2010–2011	41	330	86	6	59	8.0	2.1	0.1	1.4	
CJ McCollum	G	Lehigh	4	2021–2025	223	7,518	942	1,113	4,704	33.7	4.2	5.0	21.1	
Bryce McGowens^{x}	G	Nebraska	1	2025–2026	42	880	88	62	340	21.0	2.1	1.5	8.1	
Dominic McGuire	F	Fresno State	1	2012–2013	9	145	28	9	19	16.1	3.1	1.0	2.1	
Gal Mekel	G	Wichita State	1	2014–2015	4	43	1	13	6	10.8	0.3	3.3	1.5	
Nicolò Melli	F/C	(Turkey) Fenerbahçe	2	2019–2021	82	1,283	237	107	438	15.6	2.9	1.3	5.3	
Pops Mensah-Bonsu	F	George Washington	1	2010–2011	7	35	11	2	2	5.0	1.6	0.3	0.3	
Darius Miller	F	Kentucky	5	2012–2015; 2017–2019	253	5,161	423	346	1,524	20.4	1.7	1.4	6.0	
Nikola Mirotić	F	(Spain) Real Madrid	2	2017–2019	62	1,797	510	76	973	29.0	8.2	1.2	15.7	
Yves Missi^{x}	C	Baylor	2	2024–2026	139	3,253	986	183	1,042	23.4	7.1	1.3	7.5	
Jérôme Moïso	F/C	UCLA	1	2002–2003	51	644	178	22	205	12.6	3.5	0.4	4.0	
E'Twaun Moore	G	Purdue	4	2016–2020	264	6,889	658	531	2,821	26.1	2.5	2.0	10.7	
Anthony Morrow	G	Georgia Tech	1	2013–2014	76	1,426	140	59	636	18.8	1.8	0.8	8.4	
Donatas Motiejūnas	F/C	(Italy) Pallacanestro Treviso	1	2016–2017	34	479	101	32	150	14.1	3.0	0.9	4.4	
Trey Murphy III^{x}	F	Virginia	5	2021–2026	317	9,197	1,353	712	4,868	29.0	4.3	2.2	15.4	
Dejounte Murray^{x}	G	Washington	2	2024–2026	45	1,401	275	317	776	31.1	6.1	7.0	17.2	
Boštjan Nachbar	F	(Italy) Pallacanestro Treviso	2	2004–2006	80	1,542	201	87	571	19.3	2.5	1.1	7.1	
Lee Nailon	F	TCU	1	2004–2005	68	2,017	298	109	963	29.7	4.4	1.6	14.2	
Larry Nance Jr.	F/C	Wyoming	3	2021–2024	135	2,779	700	240	857	20.6	5.2	1.8	6.3	
Jameer Nelson	G	Saint Joseph's	1	2017–2018	43	897	96	156	221	20.9	2.2	3.6	5.1	
Moochie Norris	G	West Florida	1	2005–2006	16	183	20	21	60	11.4	1.3	1.3	3.8	
Jaylen Nowell	G	Washington	1	2024–2025	8	168	20	18	67	21.0	2.5	2.3	8.4	
James Nunnally	F	UC Santa Barbara	1	2020–2021	9	48	9	3	15	5.3	1.0	0.3	1.7	

=== O to S ===
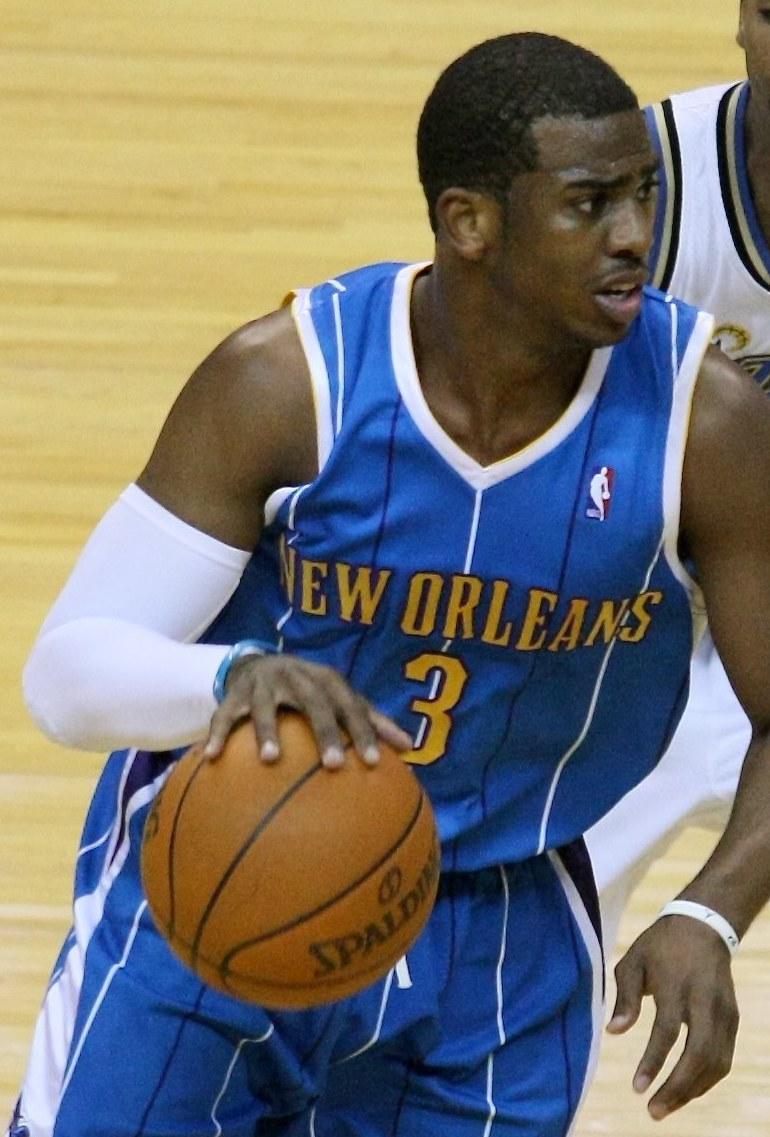
Chris Paul, the Pelicans total assists and assists-per-game leader.

|-

All-time roster
Player	Pos.	Pre-draft team	Yrs	Seasons	Statistics									Ref.
Player	Pos.	Pre-draft team	Yrs	Seasons	GP	MP	REB	AST	PTS	MPG	RPG	APG	PPG	Ref.
Josh Oduro^{x}	F	Providence	1	2025–2026	3	82	23	4	25	27.3	7.7	1.3	8.3	
Emeka Okafor	C	UConn	4	2009–2012; 2017–2018	207	5,791	1,759	129	1,975	28.0	8.5	0.6	9.5	
Jahlil Okafor	C	Duke	2	2018–2020	89	1,402	405	77	727	15.8	4.6	0.9	8.2	
Kelly Olynyk	C	Gonzaga	1	2024–2025	20	508	117	72	213	25.4	5.9	3.6	10.7	
Arinze Onuaku	C	Syracuse	1	2013–2014	3	25	7	3	3	8.3	2.3	1.0	1.0	
Robert Pack	G	USC	1	2002–2003	28	440	51	81	145	15.7	1.8	2.9	5.2	
Jannero Pargo	G	Arkansas	2	2006–2008	162	3,207	310	395	1,395	19.8	1.9	2.4	8.6	
Chris Paul^{+}	G	Wake Forest	6	2005–2011	425	15,761	1,951	4,228	7,936	37.1	4.6	9.9	18.7	
Aleksandar Pavlović	G/F	(Federal Republic of Yugoslavia) KK Budućnost	1	2010–2011	4	50	6	6	4	12.5	1.5	1.5	1.0	
Elfrid Payton	G	Louisiana	2	2018–2019; 2024–2025	60	1,638	286	466	525	27.3	4.8	7.8	8.8	
Micah Peavy^{x}	G	Georgetown	1	2025–2026	61	913	117	61	262	15.0	1.9	1.0	4.3	
Kendrick Perkins	C	Beaumont HS (TX)	1	2015–2016	37	542	128	31	91	14.6	3.5	0.8	2.5	
Morris Peterson	F	Michigan State	3	2007–2010	165	3,284	416	124	1,126	19.9	2.5	0.8	6.8	
Quincy Pondexter	G/F	Washington	2	2010–2011; 2014–2015	111	1,987	226	94	592	17.9	2.0	0.8	5.3	
Jordan Poole^{x}	G	Michigan	1	2025–2026	39	933	77	119	524	23.9	2.0	3.1	13.4	
James Posey	G/F	Xavier	2	2008–2010	152	3,871	691	199	1,067	25.5	4.5	1.3	7.0	
Derik Queen^{x}	C	Maryland	1	2025–2026	81	2,023	572	298	948	25.0	7.1	3.7	11.7	
Lester Quiñones	G	Memphis	1	2024–2025	9	166	15	23	77	18.4	1.7	2.6	8.6	
Julius Randle	F/C	Kentucky	1	2018–2019	73	2,232	634	229	1,565	30.6	8.7	3.1	21.4	
JJ Redick	G	Duke	2	2019–2021	91	2,157	203	159	1,187	23.7	2.2	1.7	13.0	
Antonio Reeves	G	Kentucky	1	2024–2025	44	660	63	39	305	15.0	1.4	0.9	6.9	
Josh Richardson	G/F	Tennessee	1	2022–2023	23	533	56	37	173	23.2	2.4	1.6	7.5	
Austin Rivers	G	Duke	3	2012–2015	165	3,529	306	374	1,146	21.4	1.9	2.3	6.9	
Brian Roberts	G	Dayton	2	2012–2014	150	2,991	233	453	1,232	19.9	1.6	3.0	8.2	
Nate Robinson	G	Washington	1	2015–2016	2	23	0	4	0	11.5	0.0	2.0	0.0	
Jeremiah Robinson-Earl	F	Villanova	2	2023–2025	105	1,573	391	109	533	15.0	3.7	1.0	5.1	
Rodney Rogers	F	Wake Forest	1	2004–2005	30	882	142	60	275	29.4	4.7	2.0	9.2	
Rajon Rondo	G	Kentucky	1	2017–2018	65	1,705	263	533	537	26.2	4.0	8.2	8.3	
Sean Rooks	C	Arizona	1	2003–2004	35	325	50	11	80	9.3	1.4	0.3	2.3	
Matt Ryan	F	Chattanooga	1	2023–2024	28	390	40	18	152	13.9	1.4	0.6	5.4	
John Salmons	G	Miami (FL)	1	2014–2015	21	270	21	13	42	12.9	1.0	0.6	2.0	
Tomáš Satoranský	G	(Spain) FC Barcelona	1	2021–2022	32	481	64	76	88	15.0	2.0	2.4	2.8	
Dereon Seabron	G	NC State	2	2022–2024	11	67	8	5	18	6.1	0.7	0.5	1.6	
Wayne Selden Jr.	G/F	Kansas	1	2016–2017	3	47	5	1	16	15.7	1.7	0.3	5.3	
Cedric Simmons	F	NC State	1	2006–2007	43	534	107	12	126	12.4	2.5	0.3	2.9	
Henry Sims	C	Georgetown	1	2012–2013	2	5	2	0	4	2.5	1.0	0.0	2.0	
Donald Sloan	G	Texas A&M	2	2011–2013	6	47	3	9	12	7.8	0.5	1.5	2.0	
Ish Smith	G	Wake Forest	1	2015–2016	27	617	92	154	239	22.9	3.4	5.7	8.9	
J. R. Smith	G/F	Saint Benedict's Prep. (NJ)	2	2004–2006	131	2,848	262	200	1,205	21.7	2.0	1.5	9.2	
Jason Smith	F/C	Colorado State	5	2010–2014; 2018–2019	201	3,775	808	134	1,456	18.8	4.0	0.7	7.2	
Josh Smith	F	Oak Hill Academy (VA)	1	2017–2018	3	12	4	0	2	4.0	1.3	0.0	0.7	
Russ Smith	G	Louisville	1	2014–2015	6	29	3	2	5	4.8	0.5	0.3	0.8	
Steve Smith	G	Michigan State	1	2003–2004	71	929	81	56	358	13.1	1.1	0.8	5.0	
Tony Snell	G/F	New Mexico	1	2021–2022	15	277	31	8	88	18.5	2.1	0.5	5.9	
Kirk Snyder	G	Nevada	1	2005–2006	68	1,310	161	102	542	19.3	2.4	1.5	8.0	
Darius Songaila	F	Wake Forest	1	2009–2010	75	1,410	232	70	543	18.8	3.1	0.9	7.2	
James Southerland	F	Syracuse	1	2013–2014	3	27	8	0	14	9.0	2.7	0.0	4.7	
Lance Stephenson	G/F	Cincinnati	1	2016–2017	6	162	18	29	58	27.0	3.0	4.8	9.7	
Greg Stiemsma	C	Wisconsin	1	2013–2014	55	1,007	226	36	159	18.3	4.1	0.7	2.9	
Peja Stojaković	G/F	(Greece) PAOK	5	2006–2011	219	7,261	882	280	3,135	33.2	4.0	1.3	14.3	
DaJuan Summers	F	Georgetown	1	2011–2012	15	209	23	10	68	13.9	1.5	0.7	4.5	

=== T to Z ===
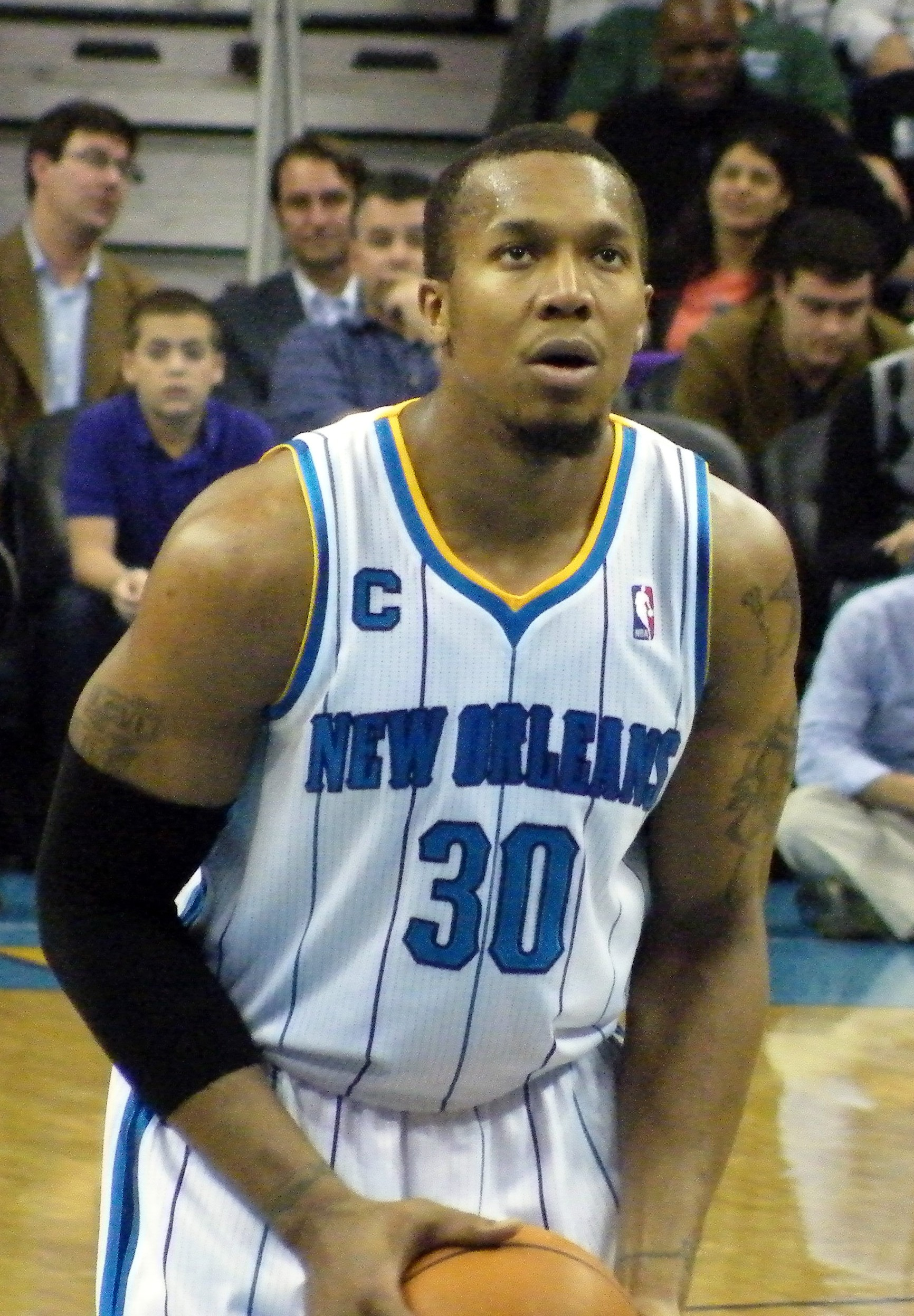
David West, the Pelicans games played and total minutes played leader.

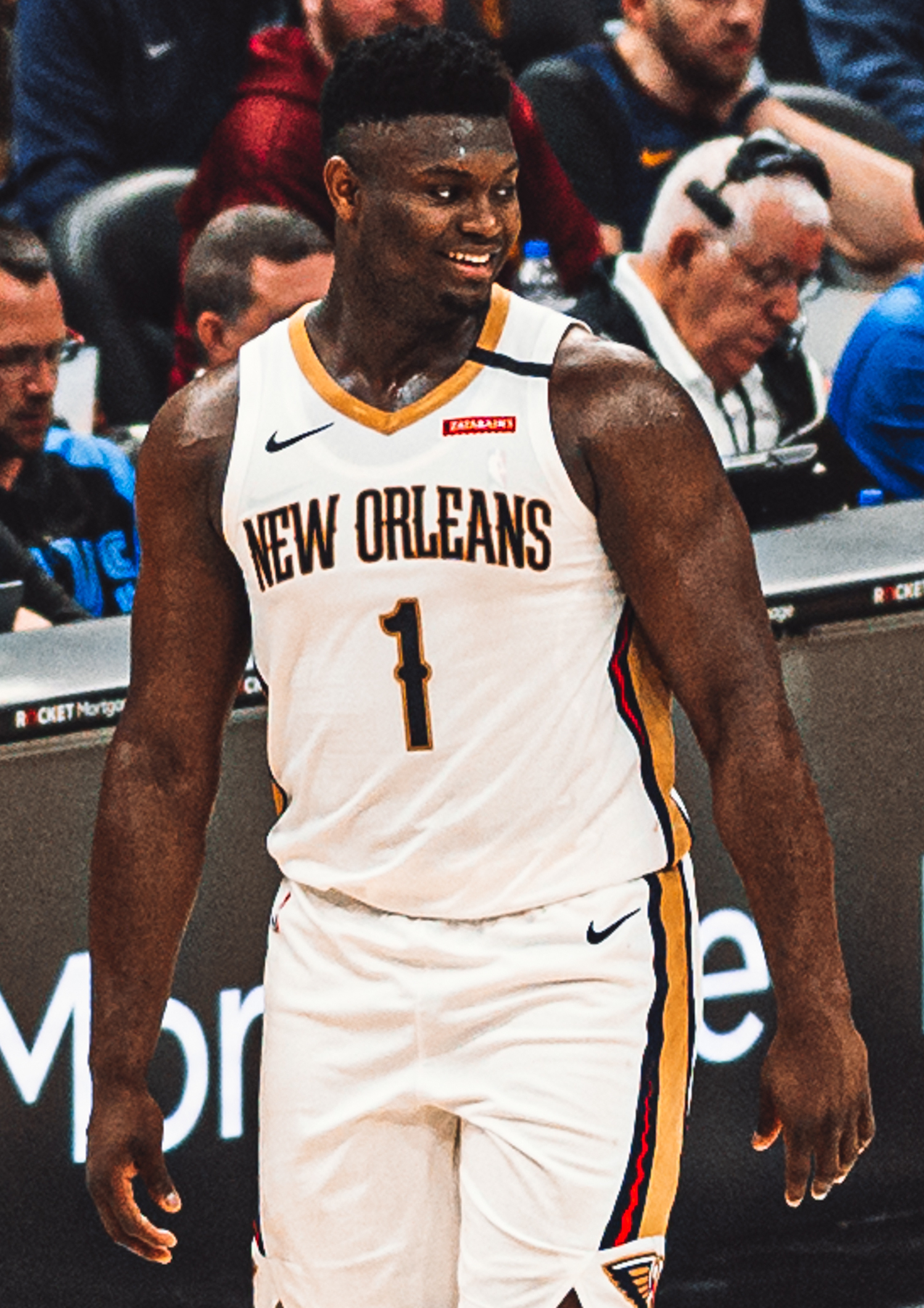
Zion Williamson, the Pelicans points-per-game leader.

All-time roster
Player	Pos.	Pre-draft team	Yrs	Seasons	Statistics									Ref.
Player	Pos.	Pre-draft team	Yrs	Seasons	GP	MP	REB	AST	PTS	MPG	RPG	APG	PPG	Ref.
Garrett Temple	G/F	LSU	2	2021–2023	84	1,260	160	87	359	15.0	1.9	1.0	4.3	
Daniel Theis	C	(Germany) Ratiopharm Ulm	1	2024–2025	38	621	164	60	162	16.3	4.3	1.6	4.3	
Isaiah Thomas	G	Washington	1	2020–2021	3	48	4	5	23	16.0	1.3	1.7	7.7	
Lance Thomas	F	Duke	3	2011–2014	106	1,318	248	32	321	12.4	2.3	0.3	3.0	
Hollis Thompson	G/F	Georgetown	1	2016–2017	9	191	28	9	34	21.2	3.1	1.0	3.8	
Marcus Thornton	G	LSU	2	2009–2011	119	2,617	342	157	1,416	22.0	2.9	1.3	11.9	
Sindarius Thornwell	G/F	South Carolina	2	2019–2021	16	108	9	8	33	6.8	0.6	0.5	2.1	
Axel Toupane	G/F	(France) SIG Strasbourg	1	2016–2017	2	41	1	0	11	20.5	0.5	0.0	5.5	
Robert Traylor	F	Michigan	2	2002–2004	140	1,793	524	93	630	12.8	3.7	0.7	4.5	
Jonas Valančiūnas	C	(Lithuania) Lietuvos rytas Vilnius	3	2021–2024	235	6,133	2,368	503	3,431	26.1	10.1	2.1	14.6	
Greivis Vásquez	G	Maryland	2	2011–2013	144	4,391	510	1,063	1,672	30.5	3.5	7.4	11.6	
Marcus Vinicius	F	(Brazil) São Carlos	2	2006–2008	26	172	19	7	50	6.6	0.7	0.3	1.9	
Jackson Vroman	F/C	Iowa State	2	2004–2006	77	1,054	248	44	269	13.7	3.2	0.6	3.5	
Tyrone Wallace	G	California	1	2021–2022	6	75	8	1	17	12.5	1.3	0.2	2.8	
Hakim Warrick	F	Syracuse	1	2012–2013	1	7	0	0	4	7.0	0.0	0.0	4.0	
Darryl Watkins	C	Syracuse	1	2011–2012	5	98	27	3	23	19.6	5.4	0.6	4.6	
Bonzi Wells	G/F	Ball State	1	2007–2008	22	438	71	17	193	19.9	3.2	0.8	8.8	
David Wesley	G	Baylor	3	2002–2005	160	5,645	394	535	2,429	35.3	2.5	3.3	15.2	
David West^{+}	F/C	Xavier	8	2003–2011	530	17,160	3,853	1,042	8,690	32.4	7.3	2.0	16.4	
Aaron Williams	F/C	Xavier	1	2005–2006	34	692	166	16	197	20.4	4.9	0.5	5.8	
Elliot Williams	G	Memphis	1	2014–2015	8	77	5	8	19	9.6	0.6	1.0	2.4	
Kenrich Williams	F	TCU	2	2018–2020	85	1,911	405	140	415	22.5	4.8	1.6	4.9	
Reggie Williams	G/F	Georgetown	1	2016–2017	6	79	6	4	27	13.2	1.0	0.7	4.5	
Shammond Williams	G	North Carolina	1	2003–2004	16	238	17	52	72	14.9	1.1	3.3	4.5	
Zion Williamson*	F	Duke	6	2019–2021; 2022–2026	276	8,555	1,786	1,119	6,581	31.0	6.4	4.1	23.8	
Jeff Withey	C	Kansas	2	2013–2015	95	943	214	37	288	9.9	2.3	0.4	3.0	
Nate Wolters	G	South Dakota State	1	2014–2015	10	105	18	11	17	10.5	1.8	1.1	1.7	
Christian Wood	F	UNLV	1	2018–2019	8	189	63	6	135	23.6	7.9	0.8	16.9	
Julian Wright	F	Kansas	3	2007–2010	179	2,283	413	124	719	12.8	2.3	0.7	4.0	
Cody Zeller	C	Indiana	1	2023–2024	43	320	112	39	76	7.4	2.6	0.9	1.8	
