= Cotton Ivy =

American politician (1930–2021)

Tennessee Commissioner of Agriculture
- In office January 13, 1989 – 1995
- Preceded by: A. C. Clark
- Succeeded by: Dan Wheeler

Member of the Tennessee House of Representatives from the 63rd district
- In office January 8, 1985 – January 10, 1989
- Preceded by: Martin Sir
- Succeeded by: Steve McDaniel

Personal details
- Born: Lamarse Howard Ivy; May 15, 1930 Decaturville, Tennessee, U.S.
- Died: May 25, 2021 (aged 91) Decaturville, Tennessee, U.S.
- Party: Democratic
- Spouse: Patricia Lou Joyner (m. 1949)
- Children: 4
- Education: University of Tennessee (BS)

Military service
- Allegiance: United States
- Branch/service: United States Air Force

Lamarse Howard "Cotton" Ivy (May 15, 1930 – May 25, 2021) was an American author, educator, entertainer, and politician who served in the Tennessee House of Representatives from the 63rd district from 1985 to 1989, as a member of the Democratic Party. Following his tenure in the state house he served as the Tennessee Commissioner of Agriculture from 1989 to 1995.

Ivy was born in Decaturville, Tennessee, and educated at Decaturville High School and the University of Tennessee. He briefly worked as a teacher for two years before becoming an entertainer. During his entertainment career he recorded four albums, joined the Country Music Association, and appeared on Hee Haw.

He entered politics in the 1980s with his election to the Tennessee House of Representatives in 1984. During his tenure in the state house he attempted to become Speaker of the House and Assistant Majority Leader. In 1989, Governor Ned McWherter appointed him as the Commissioner of Agriculture, a position in which he served until 1995. He died in 2021.

== Early life ==
Lamarse Howard Ivy was born in Decaturville, Tennessee, on May 15, 1930, to Howard Ivy. He was given the nickname Cotton due to his premature white hair. Ivy graduated from Decaturville High School and the University of Tennessee with a degree in agriculture education. He served in the United States Air Force. He married Patricia Lou Joyner, with whom he had four children, on October 26, 1949, in Corinth, Mississippi. Ivy worked as a teacher for two years in the 1950s. He was given the National 4-H Club Alumnus Award in 1986.

== Career ==
=== Entertainment ===
Ivy made four albums with the booking agency Top Billing and was a member of the Country Music Association. During his entertainment career he appeared on Hee Haw. While serving in the state legislature Ivy sponsored a resolution, which was presented by Governor Ned McWherter, alongside Representative John S. Tanner to honor Tandy Clinton Rice Jr. for his contributions to Nashville, entertainment, and the United Cerebral Palsy of Tennessee.

=== Tennessee House of Representatives ===
Ivy ran for a seat in the Tennessee House of Representatives from the 63rd district with the Democratic nomination and defeated Republican nominee G. L. Teague, who had served in the state house in the 1970s. He won reelection in 1986. Ivy announced that he would not seek reelection in the 1988 election and was succeeded by Republican Steve McDaniel.

Ivy was appointed to serve on the Education and Transportation committees in 1985. He sought the position of Speaker of the House following the 1986 elections and wrote to other members of the state house asking for support to become Assistant Majority Leader. He was ranked as the eighty-third best member of the 94th General Assembly by the Nashville Banner. In 1987, Ivy was appointed to serve on the Finance, Ways and Means, and Agriculture committees. During the 1988 presidential election he supported Senator Al Gore for the Democratic nomination.

=== Tennessee Commissioner of Agriculture ===
On October 27, 1988, Governor McWherter announced at a rally at Decatur County Riverside High School that he would appoint Ivy to succeed A.C. Clark as Tennessee's Commissioner of Agriculture. He was the fifth person appointed to the cabinet by McWherter. During his tenure he served as secretary-treasurer for the Southern Association of State Departments of Agriculture. A section of Highway 641 was named in his honor in 1994. Ivy served as Commissioner of Agriculture until Governor Don Sundquist selected Dan Wheeler to succeed him in 1995.

Tommy Hooper, the chair of the Tennessee Republican Party, called for Ivy to resign after Ivy insulted Republicans during a forum in Chester County, Tennessee. Jim Kennedy, McWherter's chief of staff, wrote a letter to Hopper where he stated that no complaints were lodged against Ivy and that McWherter would not dismiss Ivy.

== Later life ==
In 2000, Ivy and former state Senator Roy Herron co-wrote the book Tennessee Political Humor (Some of these Jokes You Voted For.). During the 2000 presidential election he served as master of ceremonies alongside Shirlene Mercer for a campaign event by Gore's presidential campaign.

Ivy died in Decaturville, Tennessee, on May 25, 2021.

== Political positions ==
In 1985, Ivy was given a petition containing 1,243 signatures which opposed legislation requiring people to wear a seat belt. He opposed legislation requiring seat belts to be worn, despite having been hospitalized after a car crash, stating that he understood "that seat belts are important" and that he wished that the "whole country would wear 'em", but that he had a phobia towards wearing a seat belt. The state house voted fifty-three to forty, with Ivy against, in favor of legislation requiring the mandatory usage of seat belts in 1986. Ivy offered an amendment to the legislation which would have excluded pickup trucks from the legislation, but it failed by a vote of forty-five to forty-three.

In 1985, the state house voted sixty-three to thirty, with Ivy voting to table, to table legislation which would allow drunk drivers to continue working while serving the forty-five day sentence given to them for a second offense. In 1986, the state house voted fifty-four to thirty-seven, with Ivy voting against, in favor of legislation that would increase the gas tax by 4¢ and the legislation was approved by the state senate by a vote of twenty-six to six.

Ivy was named Outstanding Legislator of the Year by the Tennessee Forestry Association in 1987. He voted against legislation which would have increased the salaries of state legislators.

== Electoral history ==
1984 Tennessee House of Representatives 63rd district election
Primary election
Party	Candidate	Votes	%
Democratic	Cotton Ivy	2,041	100.00%
Total votes		2,041	100.00%
General election
Democratic	Cotton Ivy	8,851	57.23%
Republican	G. L. Teague	6,615	42.77%
Total votes		15,466	100.00%

1986 Tennessee House of Representatives 63rd district Democratic primary
Party	Candidate	Votes	%
Democratic	Cotton Ivy (incumbent)	4,775	100.00%
Total votes		4,775	100.00%
