= Tennessee House of Representatives 72nd district =

State legislative district in Tennessee

Tennessee's 72nd State House of Representatives district
- Map of Tennessee House districts with the 72nd District shaded in red
Representative
Kirk Haston; R–Lobelville
since 2019
- Demographics: 89.4% White; 4% Black; 2.5% Hispanic; 0.3% Asian; 3.2% Multiracial
- Population (2024): 67,295

The Tennessee House of Representatives 72nd district is one of the 99 legislative districts in the lower house of the Tennessee General Assembly. The district is located in Middle Tennessee and covers all of Chseter, Decatur, Perry counties. It also includes south and east Henderson and most of Hardin counties. The district includes Lobelville, Linden, Decaturville, Parsons, and Scotts Hill. It also includes Sardis, Henderson, Crump and most of Savannah. Kirk Haston has represented the district since 2019.

== Demographics ==
The Tennessee Comptroller estimates the population as of 2024 at 67,295.

- 89.4% of the district is White
- 4% of the district is Black
- 2.5% of the district is Hispanic
- 0.3% of the district is Asian
- 0.4% of the district is some other race alone
- 3.2% of the district is Two or more races

Detailed demographic information is also available through Census Reporter.

== History ==
The 88th Tennessee General Assembly was the first in which all districts were numbered. At this time, the 72nd district was in Chester, Henderson, and Madison counties. From the 89th-92nd GAs, Madison was excluded and Carroll was included. At the 93rd GA, it was made up of Chester, Crockett, Henderson and Madison counties. From the 94th-97th GAs, it was again made up of Chester, Henderson, and Madison counties. From the 98th-101st GAs it was made up of only Henderson and Madison counties. At the 102nd GA, it was made up of Chester, Henderson, and part of Hardeman counties. From the 103rd-107th GAs, it was made up of Chester, Henderson, and parts of Wayne and Decatur counties. From the 108th-112th GAs, it was made up of all of Chester, Decatur, Henderson, and Perry counties. Since the 113th General Assembly, it has been composed of Chester, Decatur, Perry, and parts of Hardin and Henderson counties.

== List of Representatives ==
Representative	Party	Years of Service	General Assembly	Hometown
Kirk Haston	Republican	2019-present	111th-114th	Lobelville
Steve McDaniel	Republican	1993-2018	98th-110th	Parkers Crossroads
Bill Sipes	Republican	1989-1992	96th-97th	Bells
Daniel B. Tankersley	Republican	1985-1988	94th-95th	Jackson
James H. Wallace Jr.	Independent	1983-1984	93rd	Jackson
Dale R. Kelley	Republican	1979-1982	91st-92nd	Huntingdon
Bobby H. Butler	Independent	1977-1978	90th	Huron
Edward Bailey	Republican	1967-1976	85th-89th	Lexington
