= 2013–14 Golden State Warriors season =

- Head coach: Mark Jackson
- General manager: Bob Myers
- Owners: Peter Guber; Joe Lacob
- Arena: Oracle Arena

Results
- Record: 51–31 (.622)
- Place: Division: 2nd (Pacific); Conference: 6th (Western)
- Playoff finish: First Round (lost to Clippers 3–4)
- Stats at Basketball Reference

The 2013–14 Golden State Warriors season was the 68th season of the franchise in the National Basketball Association (NBA), and the 52nd anniversary of their time in the San Francisco Bay Area. Alongside as well as being their 42nd year at Oakland Arena. They finished the regular season with a record of 51–31, clinching the sixth seed in the Western Conference. This was three wins under their projected wins of 54–28. By reaching the 50-win milestone, the Warriors ended the second-longest 50-win drought in the league, behind Washington, which last won 50 games in 1978–79. The Warriors finished the year at a season-high 20 games above .500, their most games above the .500 mark since finishing the 1991–92 season with a 55–27 record. Part of the reason the Warriors were able to get to 50 wins this season was their success on the road. The Warriors tied a franchise record by winning 24 games away from home this season finishing with a 24–17 record on the road for their eighth winning road record in team history. Golden State followed up last season's 47–35 run with a 51–31 mark this year, giving the franchise back-to-back winning seasons for the first time since 2006-07 (42–40) and 2007-08 (48–34). In the playoffs, the Warriors faced the Los Angeles Clippers in the first round, and lost in seven games. Prior to their breakout season the next year and the subsequent dynasty years that followed and lasted until the end of the decade, this was the last season that the Warriors would fail to qualify for the NBA Finals until 2020, as well as the last season that the Warriors would get eliminated in the playoffs before the NBA Finals until 2023.

Following the season, Mark Jackson was dismissed as the Warriors head coach, and Steve Kerr became the new head coach.

== Draft ==
The Warriors did not have a pick in the 2013 NBA draft.

== Preseason ==
2013 pre-season game log
Total: 3–4 (home: 2–1; road: 1–3)
Pre-season: 3–4 (home: 2–1; road: 1–3)

Game	Date	Team	Score	High points	High rebounds	High assists	Location Attendance	Record
1	October 5	@ L.A. Lakers	L 95–104	Klay Thompson (26)	Andrew Bogut (12)	David Lee (5)	Citizens Business Bank Arena; 6,946	0–1
2	October 7	Sacramento	W 94–81	Stephen Curry (23)	David Lee (13)	Curry, Douglas (6)	Oracle Arena; 17,821	1–1
3	October 8	@ Utah	L 78–101	Marreese Speights (13)	Andrew Bogut (10)	Stephen Curry (3)	EnergySolutions Arena; 19,025	1–2
4	October 15	@ L.A. Lakers	W 100–95	David Lee (31)	Andrew Bogut (14)	Stephen Curry (7)	MasterCard Center; 17,114	2–2
5	October 18	L.A. Lakers	W 115–89	Klay Thompson (25)	Andre Iguodala (7)	Andre Iguodala (14)	Mercedes-Benz Arena; 17,482	3–2
6	October 23	@ Sacramento	L 90–91	Stephen Curry (24)	Bogut, O'Neal (7)	Iguodala, Curry (6)	Sleep Train Arena; 12,260	3–3
7	October 24	Portland	L 74–90	Stephen Curry (17)	Andrew Bogut (9)	Stephen Curry (6)	Oracle Arena; 18,307	3–4

2013–14 season schedule

== Regular season ==
=== Standings ===
Pacific Division	W	L	PCT	GB	Home	Road	Div	GP
y-Los Angeles Clippers	57	25	.695	–	34‍–‍7	23‍–‍18	12–4	82
x-Golden State Warriors	51	31	.622	6.0	27‍–‍14	24‍–‍17	11–5	82
Phoenix Suns	48	34	.585	9.0	26‍–‍15	22‍–‍19	8–8	82
Sacramento Kings	28	54	.341	29.0	17‍–‍24	11‍–‍30	3–13	82
Los Angeles Lakers	27	55	.329	30.0	14‍–‍27	13‍–‍28	6–10	82

Western Conference
#	Team	W	L	PCT	GB	GP
1	z-San Antonio Spurs *	62	20	.756	–	82
2	y-Oklahoma City Thunder *	59	23	.720	3.0	82
3	y-Los Angeles Clippers *	57	25	.695	5.0	82
4	x-Houston Rockets	54	28	.659	8.0	82
5	x-Portland Trail Blazers	54	28	.659	8.0	82
6	x-Golden State Warriors	51	31	.622	11.0	82
7	x-Memphis Grizzlies	50	32	.610	12.0	82
8	x-Dallas Mavericks	49	33	.598	13.0	82
9	Phoenix Suns	48	34	.585	14.0	82
10	Minnesota Timberwolves	40	42	.488	22.0	82
11	Denver Nuggets	36	46	.439	26.0	82
12	New Orleans Pelicans	34	48	.415	28.0	82
13	Sacramento Kings	28	54	.341	34.0	82
14	Los Angeles Lakers	27	55	.329	35.0	82
15	Utah Jazz	25	57	.305	37.0	82

=== Game log ===
2013–14 game log
Total: 51–31 (home: 27–14; road: 24–17)
October: 1–1 (home: 1–0; road: 0–1)

Game	Date	Team	Score	High points	High rebounds	High assists	Location Attendance	Record
1	October 30	L.A. Lakers	W 125–94	Klay Thompson (38)	Lee, Bogut, Speights (8)	Stephen Curry (6)	Oracle Arena; 19,596	1–0
2	October 31	@ L.A. Clippers	L 115–126	Stephen Curry (38)	Draymond Green (8)	Andre Iguodala (11)	Staples Center; 19,060	1–1

November : 8–7 (home: 4–2; road: 4–5)

Game	Date	Team	Score	High points	High rebounds	High assists	Location Attendance	Record
3	November 2	Sacramento	W 98–87	Klay Thompson (27)	David Lee (12)	Stephen Curry (12)	Oracle Arena; 19,596	2–1
4	November 4	@ Philadelphia	W 110–90	Andre Iguodala (32)	Stephen Curry (10)	Stephen Curry (12)	Wells Fargo Center; 11,089	3–1
5	November 6	@ Minnesota	W 106–93	Klay Thompson (30)	David Lee (15)	Stephen Curry (7)	Target Center; 15,559	4–1
6	November 8	@ San Antonio	L 74–76	Toney Douglas (21)	Andrew Bogut (13)	Andrew Bogut (5)	AT&T Center; 18,581	4–2
7	November 9	@ Memphis	L 90–108	Stephen Curry (22)	David Lee (9)	Stephen Curry (5)	FedExForum; 16,989	4–3
8	November 12	Detroit	W 113–95	Stephen Curry (25)	Lee & Bogut (9)	Andre Iguodala (11)	Oracle Arena; 19,596	5–3
9	November 14	Oklahoma City	W 116–115	Klay Thompson (27)	Andrew Bogut (7)	Iguodala & Curry (9)	Oracle Arena; 19,596	6–3
10	November 16	Utah	W 102–88	Klay Thompson (25)	Andrew Bogut (11)	Stephen Curry (11)	Oracle Arena; 19,596	7–3
11	November 18	@ Utah	W 98–87	Stephen Curry (22)	David Lee (14)	Stephen Curry (8)	EnergySolutions Arena; 16,051	8–3
12	November 20	Memphis	L 81–88 (OT)	Klay Thompson (21)	Andrew Bogut (14)	Andre Iguodala (14)	Oracle Arena; 19,596	8–4
13	November 22	@ L.A. Lakers	L 95–102	David Lee (21)	Lee & Bogut (13)	Andre Iguodala (6)	Staples Center; 18,997	8–5
14	November 23	Portland	L 101–113	Klay Thompson (30)	Lee & Bogut (12)	Stephen Curry (11)	Oracle Arena; 19,596	8–6
15	November 26	@ New Orleans	W 102–101	Klay Thompson (22)	Jermaine O'Neal (8)	Stephen Curry (9)	New Orleans Arena; 15,330	9–6
16	November 27	@ Dallas	L 99–103	Stephen Curry (29)	David Lee (12)	Stephen Curry (8)	American Airlines Center; 20,211	9–7
17	November 29	@ Oklahoma City	L 112–113 (OT)	Stephen Curry (32)	David Lee (12)	Stephen Curry (5)	Chesapeake Energy Arena; 18,203	9–8

December : 11–5 (home: 6–2; road: 5–3)

Game	Date	Team	Score	High points	High rebounds	High assists	Location Attendance	Record
18	December 1	@ Sacramento	W 115–113	Stephen Curry (36)	Andrew Bogut (12)	Stephen Curry (10)	Sleep Train Arena; 15,588	10–8
19	December 3	Toronto	W 112–103	Stephen Curry (27)	David Lee (8)	Stephen Curry (10)	Oracle Arena; 19,596	11–8
20	December 6	@ Houston	L 83–105	Stephen Curry (22)	Draymond Green (8)	Stephen Curry (5)	Toyota Center; 18,145	11–9
21	December 7	@ Memphis	W 108–82	Klay Thompson (30)	Andrew Bogut (12)	Stephen Curry (15)	FedExForum; 15,088	12–9
22	December 9	@ Charlotte	L 111–115	Stephen Curry (43)	David Lee (16)	Stephen Curry (9)	Time Warner Cable Arena; 13,129	12–10
23	December 11	Dallas	W 95–93	Stephen Curry (33)	Andrew Bogut (18)	Stephen Curry (10)	Oracle Arena; 19,596	13–10
24	December 13	Houston	L 112–116	David Lee (23)	Harrison Barnes (12)	Stephen Curry (9)	Oracle Arena; 19,596	13–11
25	December 15	@ Phoenix	L 102–106	Stephen Curry (30)	Andrew Bogut (14)	Stephen Curry (7)	US Airways Center; 14,393	13–12
26	December 17	New Orleans	W 104–93	Stephen Curry (28)	David Lee (17)	Stephen Curry (12)	Oracle Arena; 19,596	14–12
27	December 19	San Antonio	L 102–104	David Lee (32)	Andrew Bogut (18)	Stephen Curry (15)	Oracle Arena; 19,596	14–13
28	December 21	L.A. Lakers	W 102–83	David Lee (19)	Andrew Bogut (20)	Stephen Curry (9)	Oracle Arena; 19,596	15–13
29	December 23	@ Denver	W 89–81	David Lee (28)	Andrew Bogut (11)	Stephen Curry (7)	Pepsi Center; 18,551	16–13
30	December 25	L.A. Clippers	W 105–103	David Lee (23)	Andrew Bogut (14)	Stephen Curry (11)	Oracle Arena; 19,596	17–13
31	December 27	Phoenix	W 115–86	Klay Thompson (21)	Stephen Curry (13)	Stephen Curry (16)	Oracle Arena; 19,596	18–13
32	December 29	@ Cleveland	W 108–104 (OT)	Stephen Curry (29)	Draymond Green (12)	Stephen Curry (11)	Quicken Loans Arena; 19,384	19–13
33	December 31	@ Orlando	W 94–81	David Lee (22)	Andrew Bogut (11)	Stephen Curry (8)	Amway Center; 15,062	20–13

January : 9–6 (home: 3–4; road: 6–2)

Game	Date	Team	Score	High points	High rebounds	High assists	Location Attendance	Record
34	January 2	@ Miami	W 123–114	Stephen Curry (36)	David Lee (14)	Stephen Curry (12)	American Airlines Arena; 20,350	21–13
35	January 3	@ Atlanta	W 101–100	David Lee (23)	Andrew Bogut (9)	Stephen Curry (9)	Philips Arena; 15,210	22–13
36	January 5	@ Washington	W 112–96	Klay Thompson (26)	Lee & Bogut (11)	Stephen Curry (10)	Verizon Center; 17,390	23–13
37	January 7	@ Milwaukee	W 101–80	David Lee (22)	David Lee (18)	Stephen Curry (6)	BMO Harris Bradley Center; 11,739	24–13
38	January 8	@ Brooklyn	L 98–102	Stephen Curry (34)	Andrew Bogut (9)	Stephen Curry (7)	Barclays Center; 17,732	24–14
39	January 10	Boston	W 99–97	Andre Iguodala (22)	Andrew Bogut (13)	Andre Iguodala (7)	Oracle Arena; 19,596	25–14
40	January 15	Denver	L 116–123	David Lee (28)	David Lee (11)	Stephen Curry (7)	Oracle Arena; 19,596	25–15
41	January 17	@ Oklahoma City	L 121–127	Stephen Curry (37)	David Lee (9)	Stephen Curry (11)	Chesapeake Energy Arena; 18,203	25–16
42	January 18	@ New Orleans	W 97–87	Stephen Curry (28)	Andrew Bogut (15)	Stephen Curry (8)	New Orleans Arena; 18,045	26–16
43	January 20	Indiana	L 94–102	Stephen Curry (24)	Andrew Bogut (13)	Stephen Curry (9)	Oracle Arena; 19,596	26–17
44	January 24	Minnesota	L 120–121	Stephen Curry (33)	Andrew Bogut (11)	Stephen Curry (15)	Oracle Arena; 19,596	26–18
45	January 26	Portland	W 103–88	Stephen Curry (38)	David Lee (12)	Stephen Curry (8)	Oracle Arena; 19,596	27–18
46	January 28	Washington	L 85–88	Stephen Curry (23)	Andrew Bogut (14)	Curry & Thompson (4)	Oracle Arena; 19,596	27–19
47	January 30	L.A. Clippers	W 111–92	Curry & Lee (22)	Andrew Bogut (17)	Stephen Curry (7)	Oracle Arena; 19,596	28–19
48	January 31	@ Utah	W 95–90	Stephen Curry (44)	Andrew Bogut (17)	Andrew Bogut (5)	EnergySolutions Arena; 19,911	29–19

February : 7–4 (home: 4–2; road: 3–2)

Game	Date	Team	Score	High points	High rebounds	High assists	Location Attendance	Record
49	February 4	Charlotte	L 75–91	Stephen Curry (17)	Andrew Bogut (15)	Stephen Curry (11)	Oracle Arena; 19,596	29–20
50	February 6	Chicago	W 102–87	Stephen Curry (34)	Andre Iguodala (8)	Stephen Curry (9)	Oracle Arena; 19,596	30–20
51	February 8	@ Phoenix	L 109–122	Stephen Curry (28)	Andre Iguodala (8)	Stephen Curry (9)	US Airways Center; 17,846	30–21
52	February 10	Philadelphia	W 123–80	Marreese Speights (32)	David Lee (13)	Stephen Curry (8)	Oracle Arena; 19,596	31–21
53	February 12	Miami	L 110–111	Stephen Curry (29)	David Lee (11)	Stephen Curry (7)	Oracle Arena; 19,596	31–22
All-Star Break
54	February 19	@ Sacramento	W 101–92	David Lee (23)	David Lee (11)	Stephen Curry (8)	Sleep Train Arena; 17,317	32–22
55	February 20	Houston	W 102–99 (OT)	David Lee (28)	David Lee (14)	Andre Iguodala (7)	Oracle Arena; 19,596	33–22
56	February 22	Brooklyn	W 93–86	Jermaine O'Neal (23)	Jermaine O'Neal (13)	Stephen Curry (8)	Oracle Arena; 19,596	34–22
57	February 24	@ Detroit	W 104–96	Curry & Thompson (19)	Jermaine O'Neal (10)	Stephen Curry (9)	Palace of Auburn Hills; 14,071	35–22
58	February 26	@ Chicago	L 83–103	Jordan Crawford (16)	Andre Iguodala (7)	Stephen Curry (5)	United Center; 21,701	35–23
59	February 28	@ New York	W 126–103	Stephen Curry (27)	Stephen Curry (11)	Stephen Curry (11)	Madison Square Garden; 19,812	36–23

March : 9–5 (home: 6–3; road: 3–2)

Game	Date	Team	Score	High points	High rebounds	High assists	Location Attendance	Record
60	March 2	@ Toronto	L 98–104	Stephen Curry (34)	David Lee (11)	Stephen Curry (7)	Air Canada Centre; 18,658	36–24
61	March 4	@ Indiana	W 98–96	Klay Thompson (25)	Stephen Curry (8)	Curry & Blake (6)	Bankers Life Fieldhouse; 18,165	37–24
62	March 5	@ Boston	W 108–88	Lee & Thompson (18)	David Lee (10)	Steve Blake (6)	TD Garden; 18,155	38–24
63	March 7	Atlanta	W 111–97	David Lee (18)	Andrew Bogut (9)	Stephen Curry (7)	Oracle Arena; 19,596	39–24
64	March 9	Phoenix	W 113–107	David Lee (26)	David Lee (9)	Stephen Curry (9)	Oracle Arena; 19,596	40–24
65	March 11	Dallas	W 108–85	Jordan Crawford (19)	David Lee (11)	Steve Blake (8)	Oracle Arena; 19,596	41–24
66	March 12	@ L.A. Clippers	L 98–111	Klay Thompson (26)	David Lee (7)	Stephen Curry (11)	Staples Center; 19,570	41–25
67	March 14	Cleveland	L 94–103	Stephen Curry (27)	Andrew Bogut (12)	Stephen Curry (8)	Oracle Arena; 19,596	41–26
68	March 16	@ Portland	W 113–112	Stephen Curry (37)	Draymond Green (8)	Stephen Curry (5)	Moda Center; 20,063	42–26
69	March 18	Orlando	W 103–89	Stephen Curry (23)	David Lee (10)	Stephen Curry (5)	Oracle Arena; 19,596	43–26
70	March 20	Milwaukee	W 115–110	Stephen Curry (31)	Lee & Bogut (12)	Stephen Curry (11)	Oracle Arena; 19,596	44–26
71	March 22	San Antonio	L 90–99	Stephen Curry (20)	Andrew Bogut (17)	Stephen Curry (6)	Oracle Arena; 19,596	44–27
72	March 28	Memphis	W 100–93	Stephen Curry (33)	Draymond Green (9)	Stephen Curry (8)	Oracle Arena; 19,596	45–27
73	March 30	New York	L 84–89	Stephen Curry (32)	Jermaine O'Neal (12)	Andre Iguodala (6)	Oracle Arena; 19,596	45–28

April : 6–3 (home: 3–1; road: 3–2)

Game	Date	Team	Score	High points	High rebounds	High assists	Location Attendance	Record
74	April 1	@ Dallas	W 122–120 (OT)	Klay Thompson (27)	Marreese Speights (9)	Stephen Curry (10)	American Airlines Center; 20,423	46–28
75	April 2	@ San Antonio	L 90–111	Marreese Speights (22)	Speights & Armstrong (9)	Stephen Curry (10)	AT&T Center; 18,581	46–29
76	April 4	Sacramento	W 102–69	Klay Thompson (21)	Speights & Green (10)	Stephen Curry (5)	Oracle Arena; 19,596	47–29
77	April 6	Utah	W 130–102	Klay Thompson (33)	Andrew Bogut (11)	Stephen Curry (16)	Oracle Arena; 19,596	48–29
78	April 10	Denver	L 99–100	Stephen Curry (24)	Andrew Bogut (8)	Stephen Curry (6)	Oracle Arena; 19,596	48–30
79	April 11	@ L.A. Lakers	W 112–95	Stephen Curry (30)	Lee & Curry (10)	Stephen Curry (12)	Staples Center; 18,997	49–30
80	April 13	@ Portland	L 117–119 (OT)	Stephen Curry (47)	Andrew Bogut (9)	Stephen Curry (5)	Moda Center; 19,995	49–31
81	April 14	Minnesota	W 130–120	Stephen Curry (32)	Draymond Green (12)	Stephen Curry (15)	Oracle Arena; 19,596	50–31
82	April 16	@ Denver	W 116–112	Jordan Crawford (41)	Hilton Armstrong (10)	Steve Blake (15)	Pepsi Center; 17,232	51–31

2013–14 season schedule

== Playoffs ==
=== Game log ===
2014 playoff game log
Total: 3–4 (home: 2–1; road: 1–3)
First Round: 3–4 (home: 2–1; road: 1–3)

Game	Date	Team	Score	High points	High rebounds	High assists	Location Attendance	Series
1	April 19	@ L.A. Clippers	W 109–105	Klay Thompson (21)	David Lee (13)	Stephen Curry (7)	Staples Center; 19,339	1–0
2	April 21	@ L.A. Clippers	L 98–138	Stephen Curry (24)	Speights, Barnes (6)	Stephen Curry (8)	Staples Center; 19,570	1–1
3	April 24	L.A. Clippers	L 96–98	Klay Thompson (26)	Draymond Green (11)	Stephen Curry (15)	Oracle Arena; 19,596	1–2
4	April 27	L.A. Clippers	W 118–97	Stephen Curry (33)	Stephen Curry (7)	Andre Iguodala (9)	Oracle Arena; 19,596	2–2
5	April 29	@ L.A. Clippers	L 103–113	Klay Thompson (21)	Draymond Green (11)	Andre Iguodala (8)	Staples Center; 19,657	2–3
6	May 1	L.A. Clippers	W 100–99	Stephen Curry (24)	Draymond Green (14)	Stephen Curry (9)	Oracle Arena; 19,596	3–3
7	May 3	@ L.A. Clippers	L 121–126	Stephen Curry (33)	David Lee (13)	Stephen Curry (9)	Staples Center; 19,543	3–4

2014 playoff schedule

== Roster ==
2013–14 Golden State Warriors roster
Players

Pos.	No.	Player	Height	Weight	DOB	From
F/C	57	Hilton Armstrong	6 ft 11 in (2.11 m)	235 lb (107 kg)	1984-11-23	Connecticut
F	40	Harrison Barnes	6 ft 8 in (2.03 m)	210 lb (95 kg)	1992-05-30	North Carolina
G	25	Steve Blake	6 ft 3 in (1.91 m)	172 lb (78 kg)	1980-02-26	Maryland
C	12	Andrew Bogut	7 ft 0 in (2.13 m)	260 lb (118 kg)	1984-11-28	Utah
G	55	Jordan Crawford	6 ft 4 in (1.93 m)	195 lb (88 kg)	1988-10-23	Xavier
G	30	Stephen Curry	6 ft 3 in (1.91 m)	185 lb (84 kg)	1988-03-14	Davidson
C	31	Festus Ezeli	6 ft 11 in (2.11 m)	255 lb (116 kg)	1989-10-21	Vanderbilt
F	23	Draymond Green	6 ft 7 in (2.01 m)	230 lb (104 kg)	1990-03-04	Michigan State
G/F	9	Andre Iguodala	6 ft 6 in (1.98 m)	207 lb (94 kg)	1984-01-28	Arizona
C	1	Ognjen Kuzmić	7 ft 1 in (2.16 m)	231 lb (105 kg)	1990-05-16	Bosnia and Herzegovina
F/C	10	David Lee	6 ft 9 in (2.06 m)	240 lb (109 kg)	1983-04-29	Florida
G	8	Nemanja Nedović	6 ft 3 in (1.91 m)	192 lb (87 kg)	1991-06-16	Serbia
C	7	Jermaine O'Neal	6 ft 11 in (2.11 m)	255 lb (116 kg)	1978-10-13	Eau Claire HS (SC)
F/C	5	Marreese Speights	6 ft 10 in (2.08 m)	255 lb (116 kg)	1987-08-04	Florida
G/F	11	Klay Thompson	6 ft 7 in (2.01 m)	205 lb (93 kg)	1990-02-08	Washington State

Coaches
Head coach
- Mark Jackson
Assistant(s)
- Lindsey Hunter
- Brian Scalabrine
- Pete Myers
- Jerry DeGregorio

Legend
- (DP) Unsigned draft pick
- (FA) Free agent
- (S) Suspended
- (DL) On assignment to D-League affiliate
- Injured

Roster
Updated: 2014-04-18

== Player statistics ==
Legend
GP	Games played	GS	Games started	MPG	Minutes per game
FG%	Field-goal percentage	3P%	3-point field-goal percentage	FT%	Free-throw percentage
RPG	Rebounds per game	APG	Assists per game	SPG	Steals per game
BPG	Blocks per game	PPG	Points per game

=== Regular season ===
Player	GP	GS	MPG	FG%	3P%	FT%	RPG	APG	SPG	BPG	PPG
Draymond Green	82	12	21.9	.407	.333	.667	5.0	1.9	1.2	.9	6.2
Klay Thompson	81	81	35.4	.444	.417	.795	3.1	2.2	.9	.5	18.4
Marreese Speights	79	3	12.4	.441	.258	.821	3.7	.4	.1	.4	6.4
Stephen Curry	78	78	36.5	.471	.424	.885	4.3	8.5	1.6	.2	24.0
Harrison Barnes	78	24	28.3	.399	.347	.718	4.0	1.5	.8	.3	9.5
David Lee	69	67	33.2	.523	.000	.780	9.3	2.1	.7	.4	18.2
Andrew Bogut	67	67	26.4	.627		.344	10.0	1.7	.7	1.8	7.3
Andre Iguodala	63	63	32.4	.480	.354	.652	4.7	4.2	1.5	.3	9.3
Jermaine O'Neal	44	13	20.1	.504		.750	5.5	.6	.3	.9	7.9
Kent Bazemore^{†}	44	0	6.1	.371	.256	.528	.9	.5	.3	.1	2.3
Jordan Crawford^{†}	42	0	15.7	.417	.313	.837	1.5	1.4	.3	.0	8.4
Steve Blake^{†}	28	1	21.7	.375	.342	.625	2.0	3.6	.7	.2	4.4
Toney Douglas^{†}	24	0	11.0	.372	.322	.625	1.1	.8	.3	.1	3.7
Nemanja Nedović	24	0	5.9	.205	.167	.875	.6	.5	.0	.0	1.1
Ognjen Kuzmić	21	0	4.4	.385		.455	1.0	.1	.1	.2	.7
Hilton Armstrong	15	1	6.5	.474		.438	3.1	.3	.3	.3	1.7
MarShon Brooks^{†}	7	0	2.1	.385	.000	.750	.7	.0	.1	.0	1.9
Dewayne Dedmon^{†}	4	0	1.5	.000		.500	.0	.0	.0	.0	.3

=== Playoffs ===
Player	GP	GS	MPG	FG%	3P%	FT%	RPG	APG	SPG	BPG	PPG
Stephen Curry	7	7	42.3	.440	.386	.881	3.6	8.4	1.7	.1	23.0
Klay Thompson	7	7	36.7	.408	.364	.792	3.4	3.6	1.0	.7	16.4
Andre Iguodala	7	7	35.4	.516	.533	.606	4.7	4.4	1.3	.3	13.1
David Lee	7	7	31.0	.532		.789	9.1	2.6	.6	.0	13.9
Draymond Green	7	4	32.6	.467	.276	.792	8.3	2.9	1.7	1.7	11.9
Jermaine O'Neal	7	3	12.0	.563		.750	3.4	.1	.1	.4	6.0
Harrison Barnes	7	0	22.3	.396	.381	.563	4.0	1.1	.1	.4	7.9
Marreese Speights	7	0	9.7	.528		.500	3.1	.4	.3	.6	6.3
Hilton Armstrong	7	0	2.4	.500	.000	.000	.6	.3	.0	.3	1.1
Jordan Crawford	6	0	9.5	.364	.286	.786	1.5	.3	.2	.0	6.2
Steve Blake	6	0	7.5	.333	.300	.000	.7	.3	.0	.0	1.8
Ognjen Kuzmić	3	0	2.7				1.3	.0	.0	.0	.0
Nemanja Nedović	1	0	0.0				.0	.0	.0	.0	.0

- ^{†} Denotes player spent time with another team in the season. Stats reflect time with the Warriors only.

== Transactions ==
=== Trades ===
June 27, 2013
June 27, 2013	To Golden State Warriors: Draft rights to 30th pick (Serbia) Nemanja Nedović	To Phoenix Suns: Draft rights to 29th pick (United States) Archie Goodwin; (United States) Malcolm Lee

July 10, 2013
July 10, 2013	To Golden State Warriors: (United States) Andre Iguodala (from Denver) (sign and trade); (United States) Kevin Murphy (from Utah)	To Utah Jazz: (Latvia) Andris Biedriņš (from Golden State); (United States) Richard Jefferson (from Golden State); (United States) Brandon Rush (from Golden State); 2014 & 2017 first-round draft picks (from Golden State); 2016 & 2017 second-round draft picks (from Golden State); 2018 second-round draft pick (from Denver); Cash considerations (from Golden State)	To Denver Nuggets: (United States) Randy Foye (from Utah) (sign and trade); 2018 second-round draft pick (from Golden State)

January 15, 2014
January 15, 2014	To Golden State Warriors: (United States) Jordan Crawford (from Boston); (United States) MarShon Brooks (from Boston)	To Boston Celtics: (Canada) Joel Anthony (from Miami); 2016 second-round pick (from Miami); Conditional first-round pick (from Philadelphia via Golden State)	To Miami Heat: (United States) Toney Douglas (from Golden State)

February 19, 2014
February 19, 2014	To Golden State Warriors: (United States) Steve Blake	To Los Angeles Lakers: (United States) MarShon Brooks; (United States) Kent Bazemore

=== Free agency ===
==== Additions ====
Player	Signed	Former team
(United States) Marreese Speights	3-year contract worth $10.9 million	Cleveland Cavaliers
(United States) Toney Douglas	1-year contract worth $1.6 million	Sacramento Kings
(United States) Jermaine O'Neal	1-year contract worth $2 million	Phoenix Suns
(United States) Hilton Armstrong		Santa Cruz Warriors (NBA D-League)

==== Subtractions ====
Player	Reason left	New team
(United States) Jarrett Jack	4-year contract worth $25 million	Cleveland Cavaliers
(United States) Carl Landry	4-year contract worth $26 million	Sacramento Kings
(United States) Hilton Armstrong	Waived	Santa Cruz Warriors (NBA D-League)
