= Jordan Crawford =

American basketball player (born 1988)

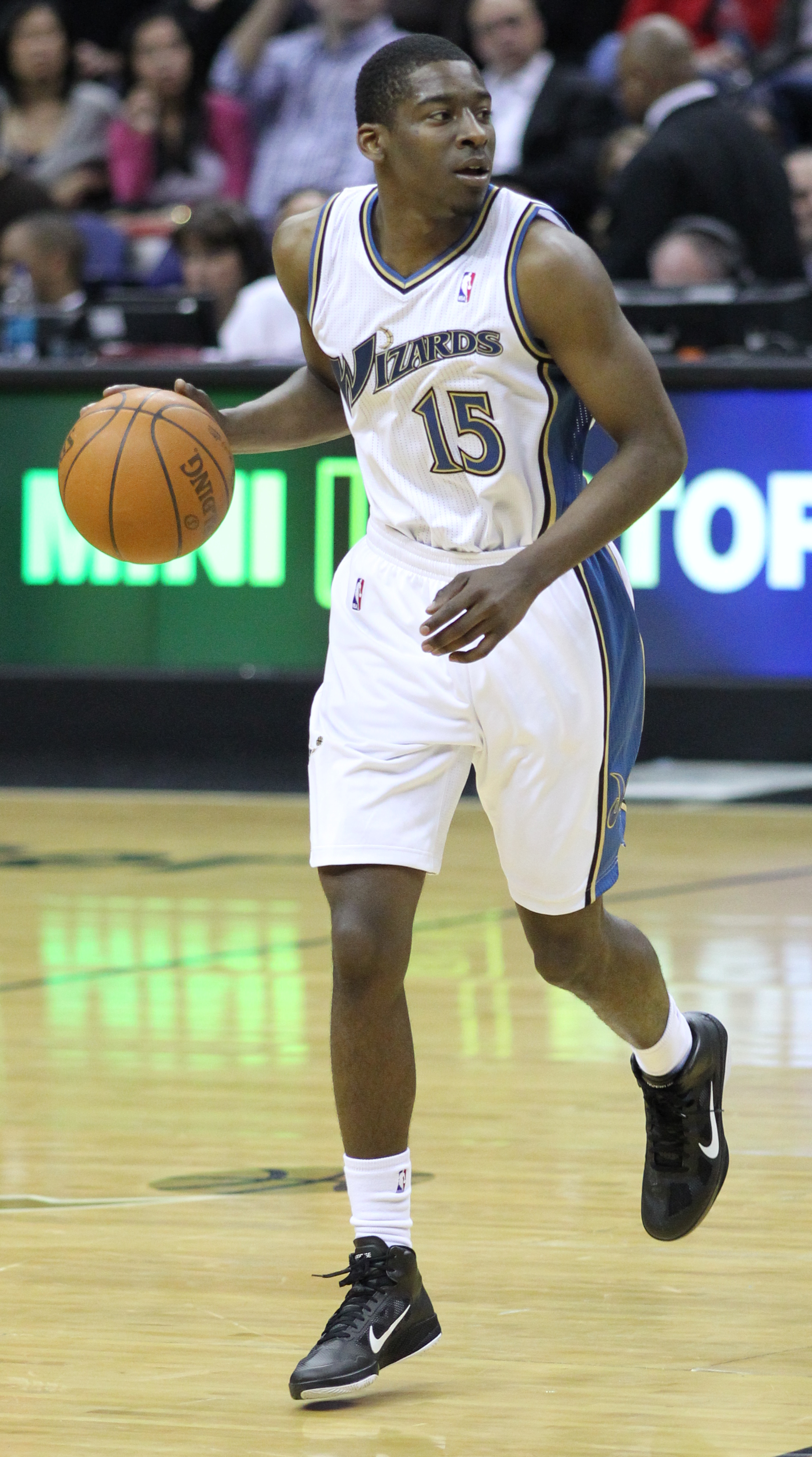
- Crawford with the Washington Wizards in 2011

Personal information
- Born: October 23, 1988 (age 37) Detroit, Michigan, U.S.
- Listed height: 6 ft 4 in (1.93 m)
- Listed weight: 195 lb (88 kg)

Career information
- High school: Communication and Media Arts (Detroit, Michigan); Hargrave Military Academy (Chatham, Virginia)
- College: Indiana (2007–2008); Xavier (2009–2010)
- NBA draft: 2010: 1st round, 27th overall pick
- Drafted by: New Jersey Nets
- Playing career: 2010–2024
- Position: Shooting guard
- Number: 15, 27, 55, 21, 4

Career history
- 2010–2011: Atlanta Hawks
- 2011–2013: Washington Wizards
- 2013–2014: Boston Celtics
- 2014: Golden State Warriors
- 2014: Xinjiang Flying Tigers
- 2015: Fort Wayne Mad Ants
- 2015–2016: Tianjin Ronggang
- 2016–2017: Grand Rapids Drive
- 2017–2018: New Orleans Pelicans
- 2019: Ironi Nahariya
- 2019: Sichuan Blue Whales
- 2020: Brose Bamberg
- 2020–2021: Lokomotiv Kuban
- 2021: Galatasaray
- 2021–2022: Long Island Nets
- 2022: Gigantes de Carolina
- 2022: Manama Club
- 2023: Sichuan Blue Whales
- 2024: Gladiadores de Anzoátegui

Career highlights
- Third-team All-American – SN (2010); First-team All-Atlantic 10 (2010)
- Stats at NBA.com
- Stats at Basketball Reference

Jordan Lee Crawford (born October 23, 1988) is an American former professional basketball player. He played college basketball for the Indiana Hoosiers and the Xavier Musketeers. His brother is Joe Crawford, who has also played in the NBA.

== Early life ==
Crawford was born to parents Joseph Sr. and Sylvia Crawford in Detroit, Michigan in 1988. In high school, he had suffered an ankle injury which forced him to miss his senior year of basketball. He attended Detroit's Communication and Media Arts High School and the prep school, Hargrave Military Academy, in Chatham, Virginia.

== College career ==
=== Indiana University ===
Crawford signed a National Letter of Intent to play at Indiana University and enrolled in 2007. Crawford played 30 games as a freshman at Indiana starting eight times and finished seventh among Big Ten Conference freshmen in scoring with 9.7 points per game, while helping Indiana finish 25–8 overall, 14–4 in the Big Ten and advancing to the NCAA tournament. Crawford scored in double figures 15 times as a freshman, including a career high 21 points in Indiana's win at Northwestern on February 23, 2008, and had a near perfect night from the floor at Northwestern going for 6-for-7 overall and 4-for-5 behind the three-point line while handing out all five of his assists. He also made all five of his free throw attempts at the free throw line. Indiana recorded a 13–2 record when Crawford scored in double figures.

=== Xavier University ===
After fallout from the Kelvin Sampson controversy, Crawford transferred to Xavier University in 2008. Xavier was one of only two nonconference regular season losses for the Hoosiers in the 2007–2008 season when Crawford was at Indiana University. Having been denied immediate eligibility by the NCAA, Crawford had to sit out the 2008–2009 season, but was able to still practice with the Musketeers.

In the summer of 2009, rumors abounded that a college player dunked on LeBron James in a pickup game at a mini-camp cosponsored by James and Nike. Adding to the tale, amateur videos of the game and subsequent dunk were allegedly confiscated by Nike at the behest of James. Later, Nike claimed there was a standing policy of no taping at the camp. It was then reported that it was in fact Jordan Crawford, a sophomore guard at Xavier, that made the feat at the LeBron James Skills Academy. Footage leaked out about a week later on YouTube.

Crawford returned to play for the 2009–2010 season with the Muskies and led Xavier and the Atlantic 10 in scoring with 20.5 points per game, with .462 FG%. He scored in double figures in 31 straight games and 34 of XU's 35. Crawford scored 20+ in 20 games for the Musketeers and landed a spot on the First Team All-Atlantic 10. Xavier won its 4th straight A-10 title and earned a 6-seed in the NCAA tournament. Crawford led the Muskies past the 3-seed Pittsburgh Panthers to its 3rd straight Sweet Sixteen, one of only two teams to accomplish during '08–'10. Xavier lost to the 2-seed Kansas State Wildcats in the West Regional semifinal in what CBSSports.com called "one of the best games in the history of the Sweet 16.". Crawford scored a career high 32 in the double overtime thriller including a deep three-pointer sending the game to the second overtime. Crawford earned a spot on the five-member NCAA Tournament All-West Region Team after averaging 29.0 points per game in the three appearances. Crawford scored more points (718) for a sophomore than any other in Xavier's history. He also finished 4th in the Musketeer's single season scoring history. Crawford was named by Sporting News a Third Team All-American and A-10 Player of the Year. Crawford entered the 2010 NBA draft after two years of college play becoming the first Musketeer to enter the draft before graduating. At Xavier, Crawford wore the number 55.

== Professional career ==
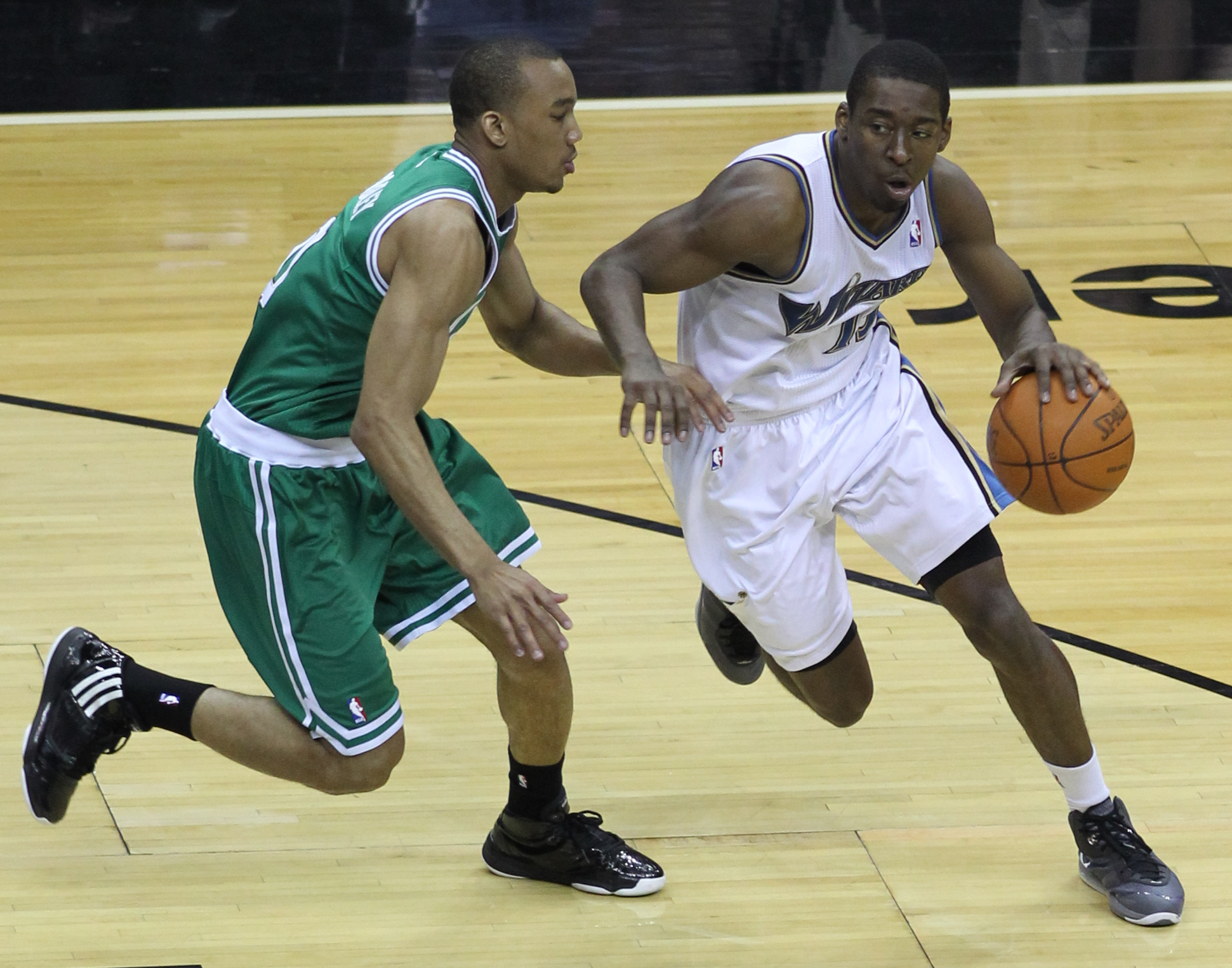
Avery Bradley and Jordan Crawford

=== Atlanta Hawks (2010–2011) ===
Crawford was selected by the New Jersey Nets with the 27th overall pick in the 2010 NBA draft. Due to his play style he was nicknamed "Sizzle". His rights were later traded to the Atlanta Hawks and he joined the team for the 2010 NBA Summer League. On July 9, 2010, he signed his rookie scale contract with the Hawks.

=== Washington Wizards (2011–2013) ===
On February 23, 2011, Crawford was traded to the Washington Wizards along with Maurice Evans and Mike Bibby for Kirk Hinrich and Hilton Armstrong. On March 8, 2011, Crawford scored a then-career high 22 points against the Milwaukee Bucks. On March 15, 2011, he passed his previous career high, scoring 27 points in a loss to the Chicago Bulls. He passed it again on March 30, 2011, by scoring 39 points in a loss to the Miami Heat. On April 1, 2011, Crawford recorded his first triple-double of his professional career in a game against the Cleveland Cavaliers. He had 21 points, 11 assists, and 10 rebounds. Crawford was the second Wizards rookie that season to record a triple double; John Wall had done so earlier that season. In the 2012–13 season, he was moved to point guard when John Wall missed time due to injury. He recorded his second triple-double with 27 points, 11 assists and 11 rebounds in a December game against the Atlanta Hawks.

=== Boston Celtics (2013–2014) ===
On February 21, 2013, Crawford was traded to the Boston Celtics for Leandro Barbosa and Jason Collins. In his debut with the Celtics, he came off the bench to record 2 assists, 3 rebounds, and 10 points, shooting 4 for 9 from the field.

Due to the injury of Rajon Rondo, Crawford became the starting point guard of the team at the beginning of the 2013–14 season. On November 29, 2013, he recorded his third triple-double with 11 points, 11 rebounds and 10 assists in a 103–86 victory over the Cleveland Cavaliers. On December 9, 2013, Crawford was named Eastern Conference Player of the Week after averaging 23.3 points, 6.1 assists, and 3 rebounds on 61 percent shooting, helping the Celtics go 3–0 for the week.

=== Golden State Warriors (2014) ===
On January 15, 2014, a three-team trade was completed involving the Boston Celtics, the Golden State Warriors, and the Miami Heat. The Celtics sent Crawford and MarShon Brooks to the Warriors. In exchange, the Celtics received Joel Anthony, a protected future draft pick Philadelphia sent to Miami in an earlier trade, and a 2016 second-round draft pick from the Heat. The Heat also received Toney Douglas from the Warriors as part of the deal.

On April 16, 2014, Crawford scored a career high 41 points in a 116–112 win over the Denver Nuggets in the final regular season game of the season.

=== Xinjiang Flying Tigers (2014) ===
On September 18, 2014, Crawford signed a one-year deal with the Xinjiang Flying Tigers of the Chinese Basketball Association. However, he left Xinjiang in November 2014 after appearing in just five games.

=== Fort Wayne Mad Ants (2015) ===
On March 10, 2015, Crawford was acquired by the Fort Wayne Mad Ants of the NBA Development League. In 14 games for the Mad Ants, he averaged 24.4 points, 5.7 rebounds, 4.9 assists and 2.2 steals per game.

=== Tianjin Ronggang (2015–2016) ===
In July 2015, Crawford joined the Dallas Mavericks for the 2015 NBA Summer League, where he averaged 10.2 points, 3.0 rebounds, 2.7 assists and 1.5 steals in six games. On September 28, he signed with the Chicago Bulls. However, he was later waived by the Bulls on October 22 after appearing in five preseason games. On November 19, he returned to China, this time signing with Tianjin Ronggang. On January 8, 2016, Crawford scored 72 of the team's 104 points in a loss to the Sichuan Blue Whales. He shot 25-of-52 from the field, including 4-of-12 from three-point range, and was 18-of-20 from the free throw line, while also recording a season-high 16 rebounds.

=== Grand Rapids Drive (2016–2017) ===
On October 30, 2016, Crawford was acquired by the Grand Rapids Drive of the NBA Development League.

=== New Orleans Pelicans (2017–2018) ===
On March 6, 2017, Crawford signed a 10-day contract with the New Orleans Pelicans. That night, he scored 19 points against the Utah Jazz in his first NBA appearance since April 16, 2014. On March 16, 2017, he signed with the Pelicans for the remainder of the 2016–17 season. Three days later, he had a season-high 22 points in 21 minutes in a 123–109 win over the Minnesota Timberwolves.

On October 22, 2017, Crawford was waived by the Pelicans after appearing in the team's first two games of the 2017–18 season. On April 5, 2018, Crawford was signed for the remainder of the season by the Pelicans. Near the end of the season and during the 2018 NBA Playoffs, Crawford would wear the shoes created by the Big Baller Brand, thus being the first NBA player not related to Lonzo Ball's family to wear apparel from the family's company.

=== Ironi Nahariya (2019) ===
On November 19, 2018, Crawford signed a one-month contract with the German team Alba Berlin. However, Crawford had his contract with Alba Berlin rescinded two days later after Crawford didn't pass the physicals.

On January 8, 2019, Crawford signed with the Israeli team Ironi Nahariya for the remainder of the season. On January 27, 2019, Crawford recorded 21 points in his third game with Nahariya, shooting 4-for-9 from three-point range, along with two rebounds and five assists, leading Nahariya to a 86–80 win over Hapoel Jerusalem. On February 13, 2019, Crawford parted ways with Nahariya after appearing in five games.

=== Brose Bamberg (2020) ===
On February 25, 2020, Crawford signed with Brose Bamberg of the German Basketball Bundesliga (BBL).

=== Lokomotiv Kuban (2020–2021) ===
On July 3, 2020, Crawford signed with Lokomotiv Kuban of the VTB United League.

=== Galatasaray (2021) ===
On February 24, 2021, Crawford signed with Galatasaray of the Turkish Basketball Super League (BSL).

=== Long Island Nets (2021–2022) ===
On December 30, 2021, Crawford signed with the Long Island Nets of the NBA G League. In eight games, he averaged 13.4 points, 3.5 rebounds and 2.8 assists per game. Crawford was waived on January 31. Crawford was reacquired by the Long Island Nets on March 11, 2022.

=== Gigantes de Carolina (2022) ===
On April 7, 2022, Crawford signed with Gigantes de Carolina from Puerto Rico.

== Career statistics ==
Legend
GP	Games played	GS	Games started	MPG	Minutes per game
FG%	Field goal percentage	3P%	3-point field goal percentage	FT%	Free throw percentage
RPG	Rebounds per game	APG	Assists per game	SPG	Steals per game
BPG	Blocks per game	PPG	Points per game	**Bold**	Career high

=== NBA ===
==== Regular season ====
Year	Team	GP	GS	MPG	FG%	3P%	FT%	RPG	APG	SPG	BPG	PPG
2010–11	Atlanta	16	0	10.0	.351	.333	.667	1.8	.9	.2	.0	4.2
2010–11	Washington	26	18	**33.3**	.390	.238	.885	3.0	3.9	**1.4**	.1	**16.3**
2011–12	Washington	**64**	32	27.4	.400	.289	.793	2.6	3.0	.9	.1	14.7
2012–13	Washington	43	12	26.2	.415	.345	.821	**3.1**	3.7	.6	.1	13.2
2012–13	Boston	27	2	21.6	.415	.320	.792	2.7	2.5	.4	.1	9.1
2013–14	Boston	39	**35**	30.7	.414	.318	.873	**3.1**	**5.7**	.9	.1	13.7
2013–14	Golden State	42	0	15.7	.417	.313	.837	1.5	1.4	.3	.0	8.4
2016–17	New Orleans	19	0	23.3	**.482**	.389	.769	1.8	3.0	.6	.1	14.1
2017–18	New Orleans	5	0	10.6	.444	**.571**	**1.000**	.8	2.6	.2	**.2**	6.6
Career		281	99	24.4	.411	.317	.826	2.5	3.1	.7	.1	12.2

=== Playoffs ===
Year	Team	GP	GS	MPG	FG%	3P%	FT%	RPG	APG	SPG	BPG	PPG
2013	Boston	5	0	**11.8**	.304	.250	.500	.6	.0	.4	.0	3.6
2014	Golden State	**6**	0	9.5	.364	.286	**.786**	1.5	.3	.2	.0	6.2
2018	New Orleans	2	0	7.5	**.615**	**.375**	–	**2.0**	**.5**	**.5**	.0	**9.5**
Career		13	0	10.1	.391	.296	.750	1.2	.2	.3	.0	5.7

=== College ===
Year	Team	GP	GS	MPG	FG%	3P%	FT%	RPG	APG	SPG	BPG	PPG
2007–08	Indiana	30	8	25.3	.440	.366	.746	3.4	2.3	.9	**.2**	9.7
2008–09	Xavier	Transfer										
2009–10	Xavier	**35**	**34**	**32.8**	**.462**	**.391**	**.773**	**4.7**	**2.9**	**1.3**	**.2**	**20.5**
Career		65	42	29.3	.455	.384	.765	4.1	2.6	1.2	.2	15.5

== Awards and honors ==
- Sporting News Third Team All-American
- Sporting News and foxsports.com Atlantic 10 Conference Player of the Year
- First Team All-Atlantic 10
- NCAA Men's Division I Basketball Tournament All-West Region Team
- USBWA All-District V Team
- NABC All-District 4 First Team

== See also ==
- 2010 NCAA Men's Basketball All-Americans
