= Kirk Haston =

American basketball player and politician (born 1979)

Member of the Tennessee House of Representatives from the 72nd district
- Incumbent
- Assumed office January 8, 2019
- Preceded by: Steve McDaniel

Personal details
- Born: March 10, 1979 (age 47) Lobelville, Tennessee, U.S.
- Party: Republican
- Spouse: Kasey Haston
- Children: 3
- Education: Indiana University (BS); Cumberland University (MAE)
- Basketball career

Personal information
- Listed height: 6 ft 9 in (2.06 m)
- Listed weight: 242 lb (110 kg)

Career information
- High school: Perry County (Lobelville, Tennessee)
- College: Indiana (1998–2001)
- NBA draft: 2001: 1st round, 16th overall pick
- Drafted by: Charlotte Hornets
- Playing career: 2001–2005
- Position: Power forward / small forward
- Number: 35

Career history
- 2001–2002: Charlotte Hornets
- 2002–2003: New Orleans Hornets
- 2004–2005: Florida Flame

Career highlights
- All-NBDL First Team (2005); Third-team All-American – AP (2001); Tennessee Mr. Basketball (1997)

Career statistics
- Points: 32 (1.2 ppg)
- Rebounds: 27 (1.0 rpg)
- Assists: 8 (0.3 apg)
- Stats at NBA.com
- Stats at Basketball Reference

Kirk Haston (born March 10, 1979) is an American former professional basketball player and politician. He played for Indiana University under coach Bobby Knight between 1998–99 and 2000–01. He was subsequently drafted 16th overall in 2001 by the Charlotte Hornets, with whom he played a reserve role for two years during the team's transition to New Orleans.

Since 2019, Haston has been a member of the Tennessee House of Representatives, representing the 72nd district as a Republican.

== Early life ==
Born in Lobelville, Tennessee, he attended Perry County High School in Linden, Tennessee, where, as a senior, he was a part of the 37–0 Class A state championship team, being named Class A "Mr. Basketball". His college career took place under head coach Bob Knight and Mike Davis at Indiana University where, in the 2000–01 season he led the Big Ten Conference in scoring and was a third-team All-American selection. In the 2000–01 season, Haston's buzzer-beating three-pointer helped IU beat the defending champion and top-ranked Michigan State 59–58 at Assembly Hall. During his sophomore year, he lost his mother, Patti Kirk Haston, 48, in a tornado that hit the county seat, Linden, Tennessee on May 5, 1999.

== Basketball career ==
Haston was selected 16th overall by the Charlotte Hornets in the 2001 NBA draft; many analysts, who had pegged Haston in the late first round-early second round area, thought that the Hornets took Haston to be a 'zone breaker', working against the change in rules that allowed some forms of the zone defense in games. Haston was known for his sky hook shot and shooting range for a forward/center.

Haston averaged 1.2 points and 1 rebound per game, playing in 27 games. Haston would only play in the NBA for 2 years as his final NBA game was played on March 7, 2003, in a 102–76 win over the Cleveland Cavaliers. In his final game, Haston recorded 2 points and 1 rebound in 8 minutes of play.

He played the 2004–05 season with the Florida Flame for head coach Dennis Johnson in the NBA D-League. There he averaged 16 points, 7.9 rebounds, 1.2 blocks per game and was selected to the All NBDL First-Team. His season came to an end when he suffered a right knee injury that required season-ending knee surgery with three games remaining.

In 2005, he signed with Upea Capo D'Orlando of the Serie A. He and his wife Kasey soon returned from Sicily to Middle Tennessee when he was waived due to a right knee injury prior to the start of the season.

In 2010, he came back to Perry County High School to coach the boys basketball team. He then led his alma mater to two state appearances in his first seasons. In 2012, the Perry County Vikings finished their season as state runner-up.

== Political career ==
In 2016, he published Days of Knight: How the General Changed My Life in which he details his mostly positive experiences playing for then Indiana Coach Bob Knight. Knight provided assistance and an endorsement during Haston's 2018 campaign to the Tennessee House of Representatives.

In 2018, Haston was elected to the Tennessee House of Representatives, representing District 72. He won with 81% of the vote.

Haston was inaugurated on January 8, 2019. That same month, Haston was appointed as the Vice Chairman of Tennessee's House Education Committee.

In 2023, Haston supported a resolution to expel three Democratic lawmakers from the legislature for violating decorum rules. The expulsion was widely characterized as unprecedented.

== Career statistics ==
Legend
GP	Games played	GS	Games started	MPG	Minutes per game
FG%	Field goal percentage	3P%	3-point field goal percentage	FT%	Free throw percentage
RPG	Rebounds per game	APG	Assists per game	SPG	Steals per game
BPG	Blocks per game	PPG	Points per game	**Bold**	Career high

=== College ===
Year	Team	GP	GS	MPG	FG%	3P%	FT%	RPG	APG	SPG	BPG	PPG
1998–99	Indiana	**34**	13	22.4	**.514**	–	**.753**	6.5	.9	.6	.8	9.9
1999–00	Indiana	29	27	27.4	.496	.000	.730	8.3	**1.4**	.8	**1.2**	15.3
2000–01	Indiana	33	**28**	**30.8**	.440	**.377**	.687	**8.7**	1.2	**1.1**	**1.2**	**19.0**
Career		96	68	26.8	.473	.366	.717	7.8	1.2	.8	1.1	14.6

=== NBA ===
==== Regular season ====
Year	Team	GP	GS	MPG	FG%	3P%	FT%	RPG	APG	SPG	BPG	PPG
2001–02	Charlotte	**15**	0	**5.1**	**.282**	.000	.500	**1.3**	.3	.0	.1	**1.7**
2002–03	New Orleans	12	0	4.8	.118	.000	.500	.6	.3	.0	**.4**	.5
Career		27	0	5.0	.232	.000	.500	1.0	.3	.0	.2	1.2

==== Playoffs ====
Year	Team	GP	GS	MPG	FG%	3P%	FT%	RPG	APG	SPG	BPG	PPG
2002	Charlotte	2	0	2.0	1.000	–	–	.5	.0	.5	.0	1.0

=== NBA D-League ===
==== Regular season ====
Year	Team	GP	GS	MPG	FG%	3P%	FT%	RPG	APG	SPG	BPG	PPG
2004–05	Florida	46	46	36.4	.456	.444	.705	7.9	1.6	1.1	1.6	16.4

== Electoral history ==
=== 2018 ===
2018 Tennessee State House District 72 Republican Primary
Party	Candidate	Votes	%
Republican	Kirk Haston	4,590	37.57
Republican	Dan Hughes	4,401	36.03
Republican	Gordon Wildridge	3,225	26.40
Total votes		12,216	100.00

2018 Tennessee State House District 72
Party	Candidate	Votes	%
Republican	Kirk Haston	16,218	81.53
Democratic	Dan T. Hughes	3,673	18.47
Total votes		19,891	100.00

=== 2020 ===
2020 Tennessee State House District 72 Republican Primary
Party	Candidate	Votes	%
Republican	Kirk Haston	6,870	69.18
Republican	Gordon Wildridge	3,061	30.82
Total votes		9,931	100.00

2020 Tennessee State House District 72
Party	Candidate	Votes	%
Republican	Kirk Haston	24,633	100.00

=== 2022 ===
2022 Tennessee State House District 72 Republican Primary
Party	Candidate	Votes	%
Republican	Kirk Haston	7,831	100.00

2022 Tennessee State House District 72
Party	Candidate	Votes	%
Republican	Kirk Haston	14,780	100.00
