= Hilton Armstrong =

American basketball player (born 1984)

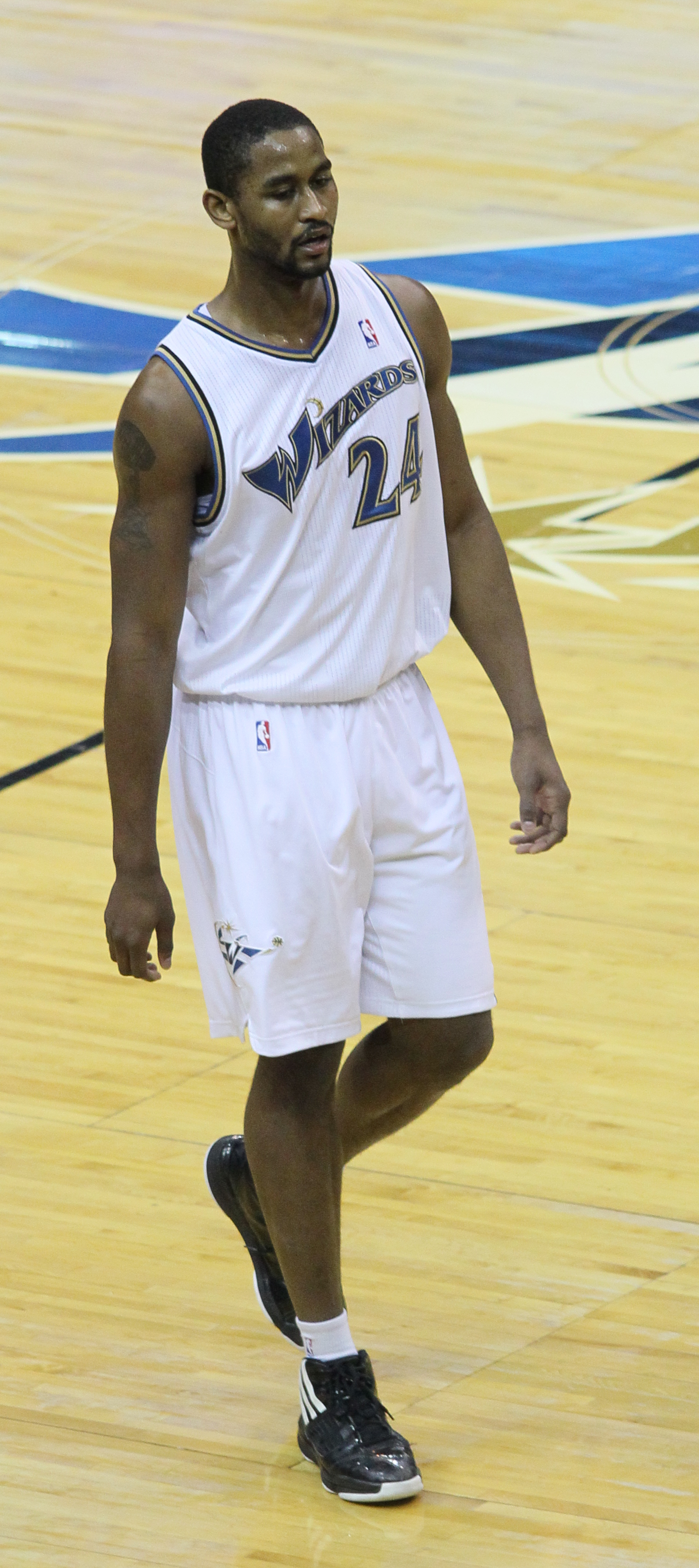
- Armstrong with the Washington Wizards in 2010

Santa Cruz Warriors
- Title: Assistant coach
- League: NBA G League

Personal information
- Born: November 23, 1984 (age 41) Peekskill, New York, U.S.
- Listed height: 6 ft 11 in (2.11 m)
- Listed weight: 235 lb (107 kg)

Career information
- High school: Peekskill (Peekskill, New York)
- College: UConn (2002–2006)
- NBA draft: 2006: 1st round, 12th overall pick
- Drafted by: New Orleans/Oklahoma City Hornets
- Playing career: 2006–2020
- Position: Center / power forward
- Number: 12, 8, 3, 24, 31, 57
- Coaching career: 2024–present

Career history

Playing
- 2006–2010: New Orleans Hornets (Note: During the 2005–06 and 2006–07 seasons, the team was known as the New Orleans/Oklahoma City Hornets during their temporary relocation to Oklahoma City due to Hurricane Katrina.)
- 2010: Sacramento Kings
- 2010: Houston Rockets
- 2010–2011: Washington Wizards
- 2011: Atlanta Hawks
- 2011–2012: ASVEL Basket
- 2012: Panathinaikos
- 2013: Santa Cruz Warriors
- 2013: Golden State Warriors
- 2014: Santa Cruz Warriors
- 2014: Golden State Warriors
- 2014–2015: Beşiktaş
- 2015: Tüyap Büyükçekmece
- 2015–2016: Denizli Basket
- 2016–2017: Chiba Jets
- 2017–2018: Ryukyu Golden Kings
- 2018–2019: Bnei Herzliya
- 2019–2020: Nagoya Diamond Dolphins

Coaching
- 2024–present: Santa Cruz Warriors (assistant)

Career highlights
- All-NBA D-League Second Team (2014); NBA D-League All-Star (2014); 2× NBA D-League All-Defensive Second Team (2013, 2014); Greek Cup champion (2012); NCAA champion (2004); Big East Defensive Player of the Year (2006)
- Stats at NBA.com
- Stats at Basketball Reference

Hilton Julius Armstrong Jr. (born November 23, 1984) is an American former professional basketball player currently working as an assistant coach for the Santa Cruz Warriors of the NBA G League. During his college basketball career, he played as a forward and center for the Connecticut Huskies. He is currently married and is the father of four children.

== College career ==
After graduating from Peekskill High School, Armstrong started off slowly as a college athlete, averaging under 4 points in each of first 3 seasons at UConn with the Huskies. However, he greatly improved in his senior year, averaging 9.7 points, 6.6 rebounds, and 3.1 blocks, and shooting 61% from the field. He followed after his teammate Josh Boone, and won the Big East Defensive Player of the Year award in the 2005–06 season.

== Professional career ==
=== NBA (2006–2011) ===
He was declared eligible for the 2006 NBA draft, and was selected by the New Orleans Hornets with the 12th overall pick. Known for his shot-blocking and athleticism, he was anticipated by analysts to be an instant contributor to the Hornets front line, but the team then traded for the Chicago Bulls center Tyson Chandler. Chandler was named the starting center and Armstrong played a reserve role throughout his time with the Hornets.

On January 11, 2010, Armstrong was traded to the Sacramento Kings for a conditional 2016 second-round draft pick.

On February 18, 2010, Armstrong was traded to the Houston Rockets, along with Kevin Martin, for Carl Landry and Joey Dorsey. He was waived by the Rockets on April 10, 2010.

Armstrong signed with the Washington Wizards on July 13, 2010.

On February 23, 2011, Armstrong was traded to the Atlanta Hawks, along with Kirk Hinrich, in exchange for Mike Bibby, Jordan Crawford, Maurice Evans and a first-round pick in the 2011 NBA draft.

=== France (2011–2012) ===
In July 2011, Armstrong signed with ASVEL Basket of the French Pro A League. In 42 games played for ASVEL, he averaged 10.8 points and 6.7 rebounds per game.

=== Greece (2012) ===
In August 2012, he signed with Panathinaikos of the Greek Basketball League. In December 2012, he parted ways with Panathinaikos after appearing in 10 games.

=== D-League / Return to the NBA (2013–2014) ===
In January 2013, Armstrong was acquired by the Santa Cruz Warriors of the NBA D-League. He played very well for the Warriors, earning 2nd Team All D-League Defensive Team honors.

On September 27, 2013, he signed with the Indiana Pacers. However, he was waived on October 26.

In November 2013, he was re-acquired by the Santa Cruz Warriors.

On December 11, 2013, after playing in six games with Santa Cruz, Armstrong signed with the Golden State Warriors. On December 29, 2013, he was waived by Golden State. On January 3, 2014, he was re-acquired by Santa Cruz.

On February 3, 2014, Armstrong was named to the Futures All-Star roster for the 2014 NBA D-League All-Star Game.

On February 22, 2014, he signed a 10-day contract with the Golden State Warriors. On March 4, 2014, he returned to Santa Cruz after his 10-day contract expired. On March 30, 2014, he signed another 10-day contract with the Golden State Warriors. On April 9, 2014, he signed with Golden State for the rest of the 2013–14 season. He started the final game of the regular season and recorded a double-double. On July 30, 2014, he was waived by Golden State. While playing for Golden State, Armstrong became the first player in NBA history to wear jersey number 57.

=== Turkey (2014–2016) ===
On August 6, 2014, he signed a one-year deal with Turkish team Beşiktaş of the Turkish Basketball Super League. On May 5, 2015, Armstrong recorded a career-high 30 points, shooting 10-of-14 from the field, along with nine rebounds, three assists and three steals in a 74–94 blowout loss to Fenerbahçe.

On July 30, 2015, he signed with Tüyap Büyükçekmece also of Turkey. However, on November 10, 2015, he parted ways with Büyükçekmece and joined Denizli Basket of the Turkish Basketball First League for the rest of the season.

=== Japan (2016–2018) ===
On August 5, 2016, he signed with the Japanese team Chiba Jets of the B.League. In 60 games played for the Jets, Armstrong averaged 10.2 points, 7.7 rebounds, 1.6 assists and 1.4 blocks per game.

On July 28, 2017, he signed with the Ryukyu Golden Kings for the 2017–18 season.

=== Israel (2018–2019) ===
On August 16, 2018, he signed a one-year deal with the Israeli team Bnei Herzliya, joining his former teammate Jeff Adrien. However, on January 10, 2019, Armstrong parted ways with Herzliya after appearing in 13 games.

=== Return to Japan (2019–2020) ===
On January 25, 2019, he returned to Japan for a second stint, joining the Nagoya Diamond Dolphins for the rest of the season.

== Coaching career ==
On October 8, 2024, Armstrong was hired by the Santa Cruz Warriors to be an assistant coach. Prior to this, he was an assistant in the video room and then a player development coach for the Golden State Warrirors.

== Career statistics ==
Legend
GP	Games played	GS	Games started	MPG	Minutes per game
FG%	Field goal percentage	3P%	3-point field goal percentage	FT%	Free throw percentage
RPG	Rebounds per game	APG	Assists per game	SPG	Steals per game
BPG	Blocks per game	PPG	Points per game	**Bold**	Career high

=== NBA ===
==== Regular season ====
Year	Team	GP	GS	MPG	FG%	3P%	FT%	RPG	APG	SPG	BPG	PPG
2006–07	New Orleans/Oklahoma City	56	5	11.3	.544	.000	.597	2.7	.2	.2	.5	3.1
2007–08	New Orleans	65	3	11.3	.453	.000	.629	2.5	.4	.2	.5	2.7
2008–09	New Orleans	**70**	**29**	**15.6**	**.561**	.000	.633	2.8	.4	.4	.6	**4.8**
2009–10	New Orleans	18	0	13.3	.380	.000	.464	**3.4**	**.9**	.4	.4	2.8
2009–10	Sacramento	6	0	9.3	.333	.000	**1.000**	2.3	.3	.3	**.7**	1.7
2009–10	Houston	9	0	4.4	.294	.000	.000	.7	.3	**.6**	.0	1.1
2010–11	Washington	41	2	10.0	.484	.333	.609	2.8	.2	.4	.4	1.9
2010–11	Atlanta	12	0	6.3	.500	**1.000**	.200	1.4	.3	.3	.4	1.3
2013–14	Golden State	15	1	6.5	.474	.000	.438	3.1	.3	.3	.3	1.7
Career		292	40	11.6	.501	.286	.582	2.6	.3	.3	.5	3.0

==== Playoffs ====
Year	Team	GP	GS	MPG	FG%	3P%	FT%	RPG	APG	SPG	BPG	PPG
2008	New Orleans	**8**	0	9.0	**.615**	.000	**.500**	**2.5**	.0	.0	**.8**	2.6
2009	New Orleans	4	**1**	**13.3**	.462	.000	.300	2.0	**.3**	**1.0**	.3	**3.8**
2011	Atlanta	**8**	0	4.4	.200	.000	**.500**	1.9	.1	.4	.0	.6
2014	Golden State	7	0	2.4	.500	.000	.000	.6	.3	.0	.3	1.1
Career		27	1	6.6	.487	.000	.393	1.6	.1	.3	.3	1.8

=== NBA D-League ===
==== Regular season ====
Year	Team	GP	GS	MPG	FG%	3P%	FT%	RPG	APG	SPG	BPG	PPG
2012–13	Santa Cruz	29	**24**	**26.3**	**.628**	.000	.694	6.8	.8	**1.0**	**2.2**	**13.4**
2013–14	Santa Cruz	**32**	23	26.2	.559	**.333**	**.743**	**7.4**	**1.9**	.7	1.8	12.0
Career		61	47	26.3	.592	.333	.718	7.1	1.4	.8	2.0	12.7
All-Star		1	0	19.0	.625	.000	.000	8.0	1.0	.0	1.0	10.0

==== Playoffs ====
Year	Team	GP	GS	MPG	FG%	3P%	FT%	RPG	APG	SPG	BPG	PPG
2013	Santa Cruz	6	6	23.2	.667	.000	.531	5.5	1.0	1.2	2.3	10.2
Career		6	6	23.2	.667	.000	.531	5.5	1.0	1.2	2.3	10.2

=== College ===
Year	Team	GP	GS	MPG	FG%	3P%	FT%	RPG	APG	SPG	BPG	PPG
2002–03	Connecticut Huskies	32	22	10.8	.545	.000	.500	2.8	**.7**	.2	.7	2.8
2003–04	Connecticut Huskies	**35**	1	9.1	.500	.000	.388	2.8	.3	.1	.7	2.4
2004–05	Connecticut Huskies	30	0	12.4	.519	.000	.525	3.4	.6	.3	1.2	3.8
2005–06	Connecticut Huskies	34	**33**	**27.7**	**.608**	**.500**	**.692**	**6.6**	**.7**	**.6**	**3.1**	**9.7**
Career		131	56	15.1	.563	.333	.578	3.9	.6	.3	1.4	4.7

== Acting career ==
Armstrong appeared as himself in the 2015 independent film Four Square Miles to Glory.
