= Steve McDaniel =

American politician (born 1951)

Member of the Tennessee House of Representatives
- In office January 10, 1989 – January 8, 2019
- Preceded by: Cotton Ivy
- Succeeded by: Kirk Haston
- Constituency: 63rd district (1989-1993); 72nd district (1993-2019)

Personal details
- Born: October 20, 1951 (age 75) Huntingdon, Tennessee, U.S.
- Party: Republican
- Spouse: Phyllis Taylor McDaniel (m. 1974)
- Children: 1
- Relatives: Adrian Smith (son-in-law)
- Education: Jackson State Community College; University of Memphis (BS)
- Website: House website

Steve K. McDaniel (born October 20, 1951) is a former Republican Party Representative from the US state of Tennessee, having represented all of Henderson, Chester, Decatur and Perry Counties.

== Biography ==
=== Early life and family ===
Steve K. McDaniel was born on October 20, 1951, in Huntingdon, Tennessee. As a young boy, McDaniel acquired an early interest in the local U.S. Civil War history at Parkers Crossroads as his father once farmed land that was part of a local battleground and that interest was spurred on when the younger McDaniel had found a Civil War-era pistol. McDaniel reportedly would often visit a local historic highway marker to read a brief narrative about the first raid in West Tennessee by Confederate Lt. Gen. Nathan Bedford Forrest at Parkers Crossroads.

McDaniel attended Jackson State Community College, and later graduated from the University of Memphis in 1973 and he reportedly first started participating as a U.S. Civil War re-enactor soon after he graduated from college.

McDaniel and his wife, Phyllis (née Taylor) McDaniel have one daughter, Andrea, who is married to U.S. Rep. Adrian Smith.

=== Political career ===
McDaniel has been city manager of Parkers Crossroads, Tennessee since the Henderson County town was first incorporated in 1981. McDaniel also serves as the City Recorder for Parker's Crossroads.

McDaniel represented House District 72 in the Tennessee House of Representatives from 1988 to 2018 and eventually being appointed during January 2009 as Deputy Speaker by TNGA Speaker of the House Kent Williams. McDaniel also served as both as Assistant Majority Leader and as the House Republican Caucus Chair for the Tennessee Republican Party.

McDaniel was the primary House sponsor within the Tennessee General Assembly of legislation: designing and authorizing a Tennessee specialty license plate featuring the Sons of Confederate Veterans Confederate Battle Flag emblem) that generates income for the organization in Tennessee; creating the Parkers Crossroad Battlefield Park; creating the Tennessee Wars Commission; establishing the bureaucracy of the Tennessee Historical Commission, and; both creating (2013) and amending (2016) the Tennessee Heritage Protection Act.

Within a 2009 American Battlefield Trust interview that was published online, McDaniel briefly responded to the question, "If you could have been a Civil War general, who would it have been?" with his choice of Nathan Bedford Forrest, a Confederate general, noted for his aggressive cavalry tactics and rapid rise from private to general.

In support of Republican Tennessee Governor Bill Haslam during 2010, McDaniel co-sponsored legislation and voted for the creation of a Tennessee state income tax.

McDaniel also presided over a 2016 multi-count sexual harassment investigation by the House Ethics Committee of then-Rep. Jeremy Durham, who reportedly "took advantage of his position to sexually harass at least 22 women" and later became the first sitting Tennessee lawmaker to be expelled from the state Legislature in 36 years.

During the last year of his serving during the 110th Tennessee General Assembly, McDaniel, who agrees with the right to carry concealed firearms, was quoted for his opposition to a 2018 proposal by both House Speaker Beth Harwell and Lt. Gov. Randy McNall to allow licensed concealed-carry permit holders to possess their firearms within the Cordell Hull Building where the state legislative offices are located. "“Just because you have a conceal-carry permit doesn't always mean you're a sane person, because we don't necessarily do psychological checks when you get the permit and you don't do checks as time goes on either. It puts you in a position where you need to carry a gun because some crazy person may come in here with a gun now and start shooting and so you need a gun to protect yourself."

=== Membership in associations ===
McDaniel has membership in several organizations promoting tourism, commerce, and Southern historic preservation.

McDaniel joined the John B. Ingram Sons of Confederate Veterans Camp No. 219 during 1981.

McDaniel also is a member of the Civil War Preservation Trust, the Tennessee Civil War Preservation Association, commissioner and former chair of Douglas Henry State Museum Commission, and serves as a board member and director of the Tennessee History for Kids, Inc. publishing non-profit.

McDaniel was also on the board of directors of the American Legislative Exchange Council (ALEC), a national association of legislators.

=== Business ownership ===
McDaniel was the President and General manager of the Cotton Patch, Incorporated restaurant (assumed name Confederate Bushwhacking, Inc,). McDaniel also reported income from both Forrest Estates and Crossroads Mini-Storage within his last (2018) Statement of Disclosure of Interests (ss-8004) filed with the Tennessee Ethics Commission.
