= Tandy Clinton Rice Jr. =

American talent agent

Tandy Clinton Rice Jr. (August 16, 1938 – August 3, 2015) was an American talent agent who was instrumental in propelling and managing the careers of many well-known country stars including Dolly Parton, Tom T. Hall, Porter Wagoner, Jim Ed Brown, Jeannie C. Riley and comedian Jerry Clower. He served as president of the Country Music Association and was the first inductee into the Nashville Association of Talent Directors Hall of Fame.

Born in Franklin, Tennessee, he was a star athlete at Franklin High School winning a state championship in the mile relay and is a member of the school's Athletic Hall of Fame; after briefly attending Vanderbilt University he graduated from The Citadel in 1961 and was commissioned into the United States Air Force serving for two years as a Public Affairs Officer with the Strategic Air Command. He was encouraged to enter the country music business by a distant cousin, country star Minnie Pearl; he began as a publicist representing artists such as Waylon Jennings, Chet Atkins, Kitty Wells and Hank Williams Jr. As a salesman for Show Biz, Inc. he convinced TV stations to carry syndicated country music shows, most notably “The Porter Wagoner Show” which was the launching pad for Dolly Parton's career; in 1971 he became president of Top Billing International, which he developed into one of Nashville's leading talent agencies representing many well-known country stars. Rice launched the career of Jerry Clower, who became one of the best-known American comedians of the 1970s, selling millions of albums; he also turned Billy Carter, brother of President Jimmy Carter into a major national celebrity.

In addition to his talent management, Rice served as the longtime host of radio and TV shows in Nashville, served twice as a judge for the Miss America pageant and was profiled in numerous major publications, including People Magazine, The Washington Post, Playboy, Newsweek Magazine and The New York Times. He served as a member of the Nashville Chamber of Commerce and for many years hosted the annual United Cerebral Palsy Telethon.

Rice received a master's degree from Vanderbilt and an honorary doctorate from The Citadel; he also served as an adjunct professor of music business at Belmont University and member of the business advisory council at Lipscomb University.
