= Oliynyk =

Oliynyk, also Oliinyk, Oliynik (Ukrainian: Олійник Olíjnyk) is a Ukrainian-language surname derived from the word олія olíja, "oil". The surname may refer to:

- Andriy Oliynyk (disambiguation)
  - Andriy Olehovych Oliynyk, Ukrainian footballer
  - Andriy Petrovych Oliynyk, Ukrainian footballer
- Borys Oliynyk (disambiguation)
  - Borys Oliynyk (poet), Ukrainian poet
  - Borys Oliynyk (Ukrzaliznytsia), director of the Ukrainian Railways
- Denys Oliynyk, Ukrainian footballer
- Harry Oliynek, priest of the Ukrainian Catholic Archeparchy of Winnipeg ()
- Pavlo Oliynyk, Ukrainian Olympian
- Todd Oliynyk, a 2011 recipient of the Australian Mathematical Society Medal
- Volodymyr Oliinyk, Party of Regions politician, 1999 presidential candidate
- Vyacheslav Oliynyk, Ukrainian Olympian
- Yaroslav Oliynyk, Ukrainian footballer
- Yuriy Oliynyk, American musician from Ukraine

== See also ==
- Olenik
- Olynyk
- Olejnik, Polish version
- Oleynik, Russian version
