= Oleynikov =

Oleynikov, also Oleinikov (Russian: Олейников), feminine: Oleynikova, Oleinikova, is a Russian-language occupational surname: the word олей (archaic in Russian, variously spelled in other Slavic languages) means vegetable oil, 'oleynik' is a person who manufactures or sells oil, and Oleynokov is a patronymic surname derived from 'oleynik'. Notable people with the surname include:

- Aleksandr Oleinikov
- Andrey Oleynikov
- Ilya Oleynikov
- Ivan Oleynikov
- Nikolay Oleynikov
- Yelena Oleynikova

== See also ==
- Oleynik
- Aleynikov
- Olejníkov, place in Slovakia
- Oleynikovo, place in Russia
