= Borys Oliynyk =

Borys Oliynyk may refer to:

- Borys Oliynyk (poet) (1935–2017), Ukrainian poet
- Borys Oliynyk (engineer) (1934–1999), director of the Ukrainian Railways
- Borys Oliynyk (footballer) (born 1967), Ukrainian footballer; see List of foreign Ekstraklasa players § Ukraine

== See also ==
- Oliynyk
