= Avery Bradley =

American basketball player (born 1990)

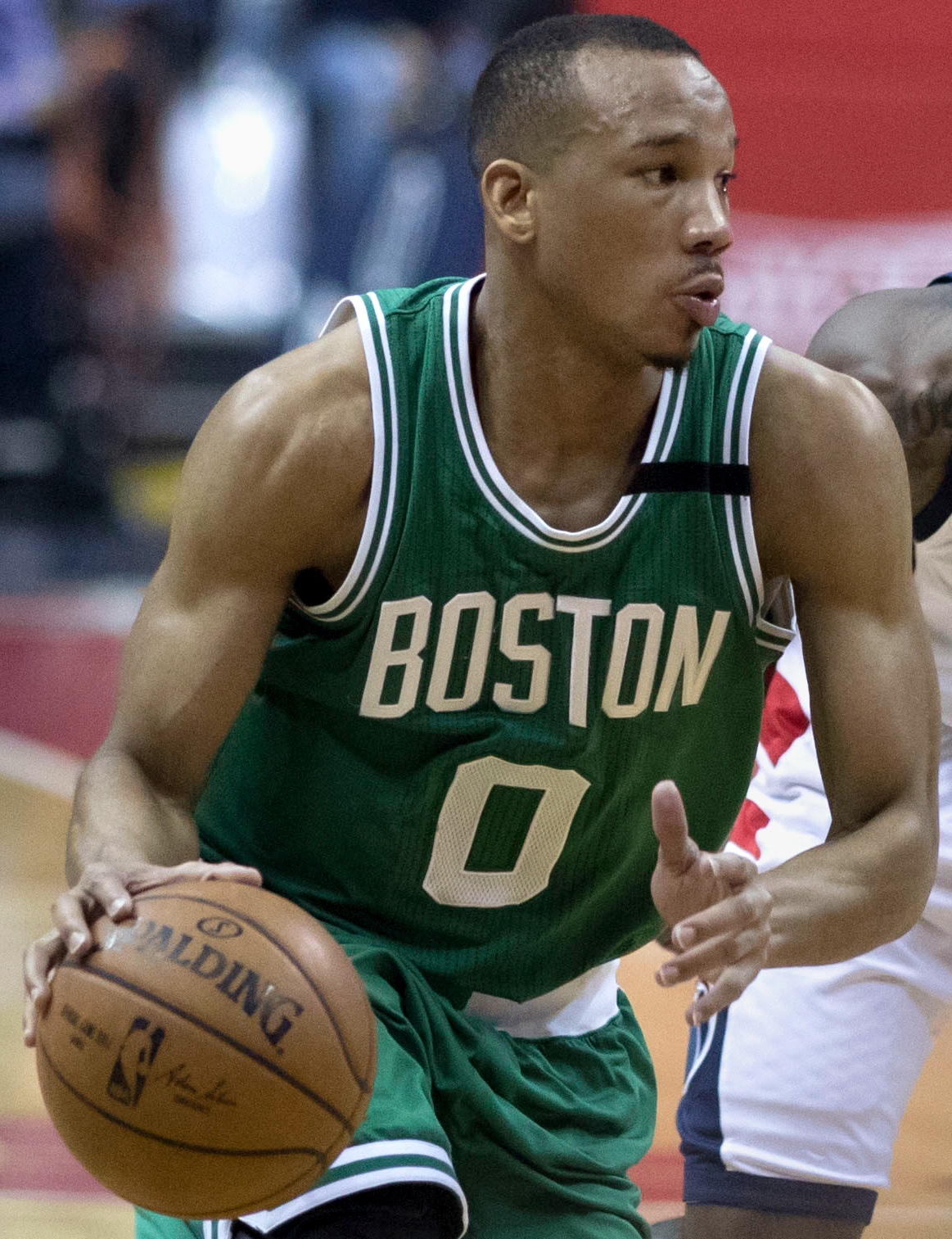
- Bradley with the Boston Celtics in 2017

Utah Jazz
- Title: Vice President of Player Development
- League: NBA

Personal information
- Born: November 26, 1990 (age 35) Tacoma, Washington, U.S.
- Listed height: 6 ft 3 in (1.91 m)
- Listed weight: 180 lb (82 kg)

Career information
- High school: Bellarmine Prep (Tacoma, Washington); Findlay Prep (Henderson, Nevada)
- College: Texas (2009–2010)
- NBA draft: 2010: 1st round, 19th overall pick
- Drafted by: Boston Celtics
- Playing career: 2010–2022
- Position: Shooting guard / point guard
- Number: 0, 9, 11, 13, 14, 20, 22

Career history
- 2010–2017: Boston Celtics
- 2011: →Maine Red Claws
- 2011: Hapoel Jerusalem
- 2017–2018: Detroit Pistons
- 2018–2019: Los Angeles Clippers
- 2019: Memphis Grizzlies
- 2019–2020: Los Angeles Lakers
- 2020–2021: Miami Heat
- 2021: Houston Rockets
- 2021–2022: Los Angeles Lakers

Career highlights
- NBA champion (2020); NBA All-Defensive First Team (2016); NBA All-Defensive Second Team (2013); Big 12 All-Rookie Team (2010); First-team Parade All-American (2009); McDonald's All-American (2009)

Career NBA statistics
- Points: 7,279 (11.0 ppg)
- Rebounds: 1,863 (2.8 rpg)
- Assists: 1,105 (1.7 apg)
- Stats at NBA.com
- Stats at Basketball Reference

Avery Antonio Bradley Jr. (born November 26, 1990) is an American former professional basketball player who is the vice president of player development for the Utah Jazz of the National Basketball Association (NBA). He played college basketball for the Texas Longhorns before being drafted 19th overall by the Boston Celtics in the 2010 NBA draft. With the Celtics, Bradley was twice recognized as an NBA All-Defensive Team member. He also played for the Detroit Pistons, Los Angeles Clippers, Memphis Grizzlies, Miami Heat, Houston Rockets and Los Angeles Lakers.

== Early life ==
Bradley was born on November 26, 1990, in Tacoma, Washington, to Avery Bradley Sr. and Alicia Jones-Bradley. He has two older brothers, and one older sister. Alicia worked in a welfare office, while Avery Sr. had a 22-year military career. After the two divorced in 2001, Bradley lived with his mother but maintained a strong relationship with his father, whose career took him all over the country. Bradley became a Texas Longhorns fan when he lived in Arlington from 2001 to 2004. Bradley and his family left Texas for Tacoma in the summer of 2004, before the start of his eighth grade year. Bradley played on the same AAU team as future Celtics teammate Isaiah Thomas.

== High school career ==
Bradley was ranked among the top high school basketball players in the class of 2009. ESPNU 100 rated him No. 1 nationally, and he was rated No. 4 by Rivals.com and No. 5 by Scout.com. Bradley propelled Findlay College Prep to the National High School Basketball championship game against Oak Hill Academy, winning the contest 56–53. After leading Findlay to the title, Bradley was named National High School Basketball Player of the Year by Parade Magazine. He played against the nation's best high school players at the 2009 McDonald's All-American Game and won the McDonald's All-American Dunk Contest. Before transferring to Findlay Prep for his senior campaign, Bradley was a three-year starter at Bellarmine Preparatory School in Tacoma, Washington. Bradley and University of Washington recruit Abdul Gaddy led Bellarmine Prep to the Class 4A State Semifinals with a 25–4 mark as a junior.

== College career ==
Bradley attended the University of Texas at Austin. He found the Texas Longhorns basketball program appealing in part because he had spent parts of his childhood in Arlington, where Bradley became a fan of T. J. Ford.

As a freshman in 2009–10, Bradley averaged 11.6 points for the Longhorns and established himself as one of the top defensive guards in the country. He subsequently earned Big 12 All-Rookie Team and All-Big 12 Honorable Mention honors.

In April 2010, Bradley declared for the NBA draft, forgoing his final three years of college eligibility.

== Professional career ==
=== Boston Celtics (2010–2011) ===
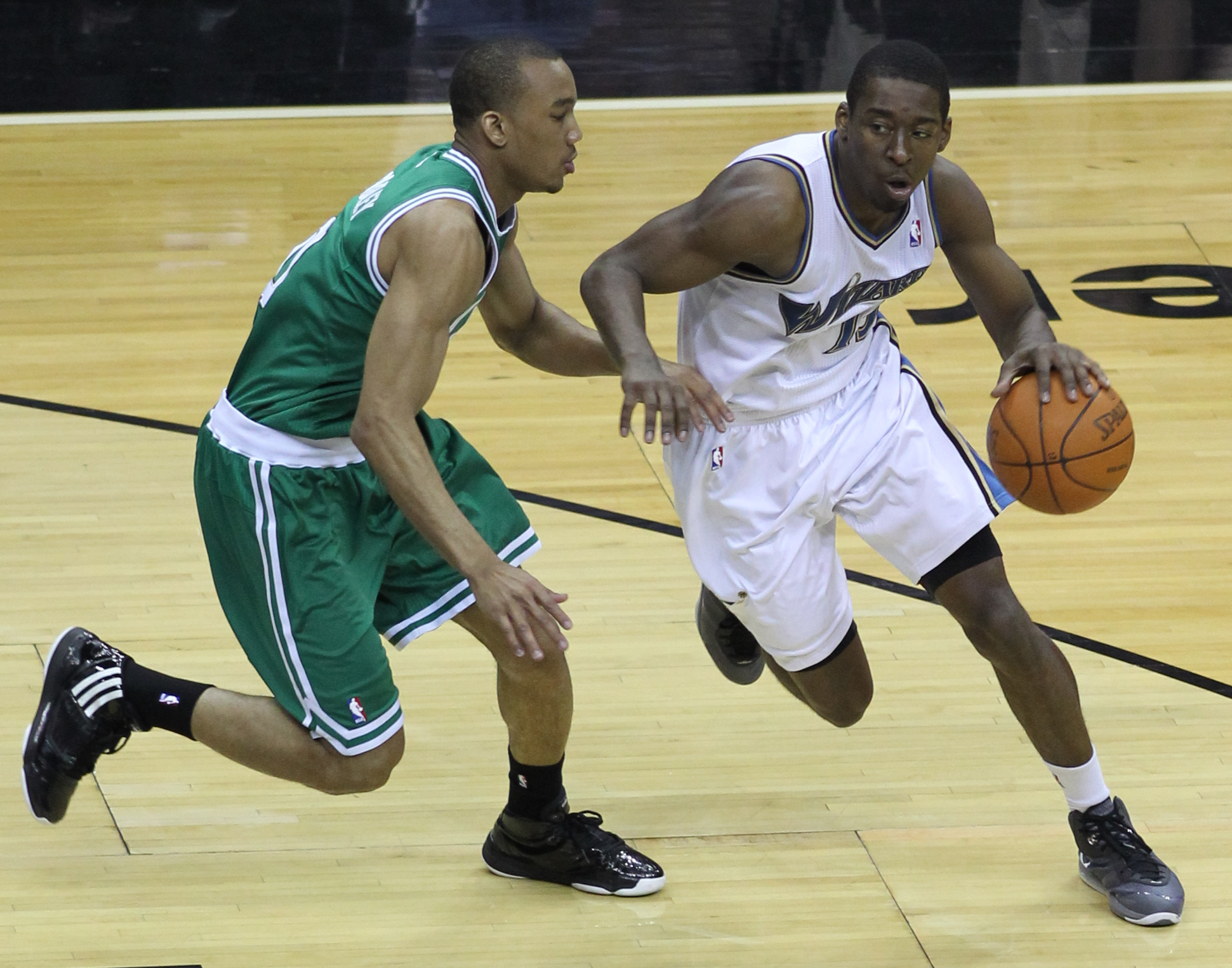
Bradley defending Jordan Crawford in 2011

Bradley was selected with the 19th overall pick in the 2010 NBA draft by the Boston Celtics. On July 2, 2010, he signed his rookie-scale contract with the Celtics. The same day, Bradley underwent successful ankle surgery and subsequently missed the 2010 NBA Summer League.

Still just 19 years old, Bradley joined a Celtics team that was one of the best in the Eastern Conference. He did not see his first regular-season action until the fourteenth game of the season, a 23-point victory over the Atlanta Hawks in which Bradley scored two points and committed two turnovers. On January 14, 2011, Bradley was assigned to the Maine Red Claws of the NBA Development League and on the same day made his debut game for the team, playing 21 minutes and scoring 11 points. Following a spinal cord injury to Marquis Daniels during a game against the Orlando Magic on February 6, Bradley was recalled by the Celtics the next day and joined the team for the game against the Charlotte Bobcats.

In the one Celtics game of Bradley's rookie season in which he played more than 15 minutes, Bradley scored 20 points to go with three rebounds, two assists and two steals. However, he played 10 or more minutes in just two other NBA games and did not appear in any of the Celtics' postseason contests. On June 30, 2011, the Celtics exercised their third-year team option on Bradley's rookie-scale contract, extending the contract through the 2012–13 season.

=== Hapoel Jerusalem (2011) ===
In October 2011, Bradley signed with Hapoel Jerusalem of the Israeli Basketball Premier League for the duration of the NBA lockout. He played three games with the team, averaging 13.7 points per game.

=== Return to Boston (2011–2017) ===
==== 2011–12 season ====
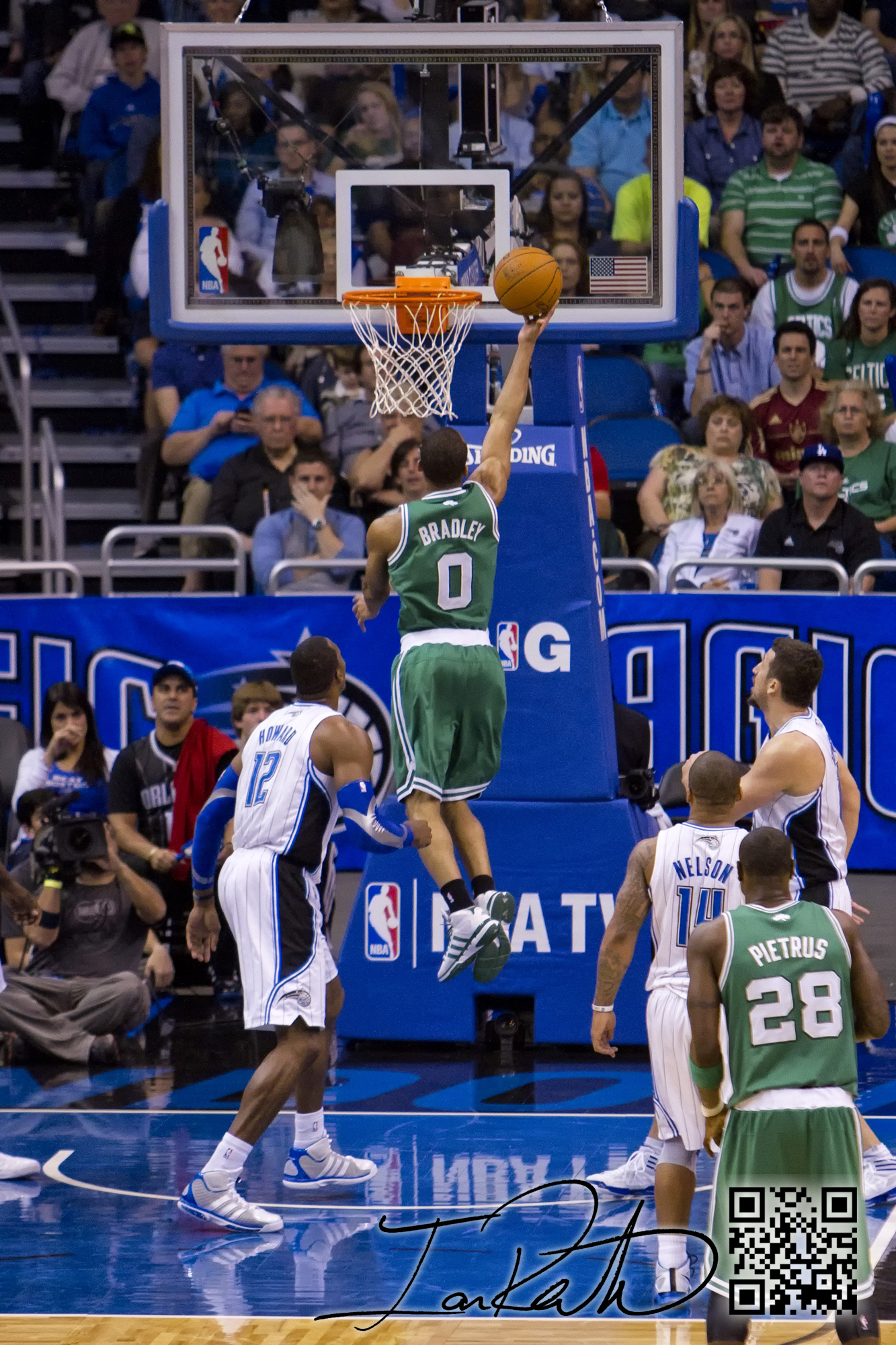
Bradley going up for a layup in 2012

During the 2011–12 NBA season, Bradley enjoyed much more playing time and was promoted to a starting role following an injury to Ray Allen. Bradley's scoring output increased significantly during the season, and he managed a career-high 28 points against the Atlanta Hawks on April 20, 2012. He also received praise for his tremendous hustle and defense, including memorable blocks on Dwyane Wade and Russell Westbrook, among others. However, Bradley suffered a dislocated shoulder during the 2012 NBA playoffs. This injury, which led to season-ending surgery, was a significant setback to the Celtics, who lost in seven games to the Miami Heat in the Conference Finals.

==== 2012–13 season ====
On October 30, 2012, the Celtics exercised their fourth-year team option on Bradley's rookie-scale contract, extending the contract through the 2013–14 season. With Bradley still sidelined for the beginning of the 2012–13 NBA season, the aging Celtics struggled with the duo of Courtney Lee and Jason Terry receiving the majority of minutes at shooting guard. On January 2, 2013, Bradley returned to action against the Memphis Grizzlies, regaining his spot as the starting shooting guard and providing a significant boost to the team, evident by their winning six out of Bradley's first seven games back. However, the season was ultimately a disappointment for both Bradley and the Celtics. Although he led the league in fewest points per play allowed on defense, at 0.697, Bradley struggled offensively, shooting just 40.2 percent from the field and managing 15 or more points just five times in 50 regular-season games. The Celtics lost any realistic chance of contention after point guard Rajon Rondo went down with a torn ACL on January 27, leaving them without their most dynamic player. After falling behind three games to none against the New York Knicks in the first round of the playoffs, Boston mounted a furious comeback, winning two games and narrowly losing Game 6. Bradley, whose play in the series had mirrored the ineffectiveness of the team, provided a gutsy effort at the end of the game, making all four of his shots and stealing the ball three times in the last ten minutes. The Celtics entered the offseason with an eye toward the future and Bradley a vital part of their plans to rebuild a contender.

==== 2013–14 season ====
The Celtics ended an era on the day of the 2013 NBA draft, trading aging stars Kevin Garnett and Paul Pierce, as well as Jason Terry and D. J. White, to the Brooklyn Nets. The Celtics also declined to sign Bradley to a contract extension before the October 31, 2013, deadline, allowing him to become a restricted free agent in 2014. However, new Celtics coach Brad Stevens professed his trust in Bradley, who, in the absence of the injured Rondo, began the 2013–14 NBA season as the team's starting point guard. Bradley's time at point guard lasted just four disappointing games; he had more turnovers than assists, and the Celtics lost all four times. In an effort to turn the team around, Stevens named Jordan Crawford the new point guard, allowing Bradley to move to his natural shooting guard. The move worked brilliantly, as the Celtics immediately went on a four-game winning streak and the more comfortable Bradley settled nicely into his role on the team. Although the Celtics' lack of talent and experience began to show itself as the season went along, particularly with Rondo still out, Bradley was a rare bright spot, increasing his scoring average every month through January. Bradley was especially effective in December, shooting a fantastic 50 percent on three-pointers and making 48.7 percent of his shots overall. Unfortunately, on January 21, in just the third game all season that Rondo was active, Bradley sprained his ankle and ended up missing five games. Shortly after returning, on February 5, Bradley re-sprained the same ankle. Determined to be cautious, Stevens still had not set a return date for Bradley as the Celtics headed into the All-Star break more than a week later.

Bradley ultimately returned to action on March 14. In his fourth game back, a victory over the Miami Heat, Bradley connected on a career-high six three-pointers as part of a 23-point effort, then followed it up with 28 points, matching his career high, the next game. When healthy, Bradley played significant minutes and played effectively in the final stretch of the season, scoring at least 18 points in the team's last five games. He shouldered a higher percentage of the offensive workload for Celtics in 2013–14, and Bradley responded by greatly improving his shooting from the previous season. In a rebuilding year for the team, one that saw them win only 25 games, Bradley stood out as one of their few consistent performers.

==== 2014–15 season ====
With Bradley set to become a restricted free agent in July 2014, the Celtics needed to extend a qualifying offer of $3.6 million in order to be able to match any contract offered by another team, which they did on June 30. On July 15, Bradley re-signed with the Celtics to a four-year, $32 million contract. Although the Celtics had high hopes for their backcourt pairing of Bradley and Rajon Rondo, both now healthy, they were soon dealt a setback when Rondo broke his hand a month before the 2014–15 season. Although the team planned to be cautious with Rondo's injury, Brad Stevens made the decision to keep Bradley at shooting guard even with Rondo out, with a mix of rookie Marcus Smart, second-year guard Phil Pressey and new acquisition Evan Turner playing point guard.

Despite the concerns, Rondo ultimately surprised many by being ready for opening night. Bradley continued to play harassing defense and scored in double digits in 13 of the team's first 15 games, including a career-high 32 points in a loss to the Dallas Mavericks. However, the Celtics struggled to a 4–11 start. Meanwhile, Bradley's offense cooled off in December, as he shot just 39 percent from the field for that month and made just 1-of-21 three-point attempts over a six-game stretch. Faced with a 9–14 record on December 18, Celtics president of basketball operations Danny Ainge made the difficult decision to part with Rondo, trading him and rookie Dwight Powell to the Dallas Mavericks for Brandan Wright, Jae Crowder, Jameer Nelson and two draft picks. Pundits such as Bill Simmons and Jalen Rose portrayed the trade as a surrender to a mediocrity, with the hopes of getting a high draft pick at season's end, and the Celtics continued to struggle after Rondo's exit.

However, under the tutelage of Brad Stevens, and with the help of trade acquisition Isaiah Thomas, the young Celtics gradually improved. After failing to post winning records in November, December or January, they did so in February, March and April, and won eight of the season's last nine games. Bradley's offensive output was especially effective in February, as he managed over 18 points per game in the month while shooting 47 percent from the field and over 40 percent from three-point range. Although a shoulder injury sidelined him for three games between March 6 and 9, he returned to score 17 points against the Memphis Grizzlies on March 11. For the regular season, Bradley led the Celtics in minutes played and points, although his points per game and shooting percentages declined slightly from 2013 to 2014. A 40–42 record saw the Celtics earn the #7 seed in the Eastern Conference. Their playoff series was brief, as the eventual Eastern Conference champion Cleveland Cavaliers swept the Celtics in four games. Bradley played 40 out of the 48 minutes in the last game of the series, but his 16 points was not enough to overcome LeBron James and the Cavaliers. Nevertheless, the 2014–15 season was a surprise success for the Celtics and another solid year, and a relatively healthy year, for Bradley.

==== 2015–16 season ====
Fresh off of their first playoff appearance in the Brad Stevens era, the Celtics entered 2015–16 campaign eager to prove that it had not been a fluke. Acquiring veteran forwards David Lee and Amir Johnson to fortify their frontcourt, the team also hoped to see the continued improvement of their promising young players, including Marcus Smart and Jared Sullinger. They started the year off slow, winning just one of their first four. Bradley provided a rare highlight, however, throwing down a tremendous dunk on reigning Defensive Player of the Year Kawhi Leonard. After missing two games with a calf injury, Bradley returned to action as a sixth man after starting 224 of 226 Celtics games in which he was healthy. Bradley excelled in his new role, improving his scoring, efficiency and defensive rating. He soon returned to the starting lineup on November 22 and proved himself highly capable in either role, immediately managing two games in a row with at least 25 points and 13 in a row with at least 10 points.

Bradley missed three games in early January with a hip injury, and upon his return, the Celtics emerged as one of the top teams in the Eastern Conference. Bradley contributed a number of memorable performances. On January 27, he scored 21 of his season-high-tying 27 points in the first half of a 111–103 victory over the Denver Nuggets. Eight days later, Bradley connected on a game-winning three-pointer to give Boston a narrow 104–103 victory over the Eastern Conference-leading Cleveland Cavaliers. On February 29, he blocked a shot from Utah Jazz forward Gordon Hayward with 23 seconds left in the game to give the Celtics a victory. For the season, Bradley was his team's second leading scorer, behind only All-Star Isaiah Thomas.

With a 48–34 record, the Celtics finished the regular season in a four-way tie for the third seed in Eastern Conference and were assigned the fifth seed based on tiebreaker rules. Drawing the Atlanta Hawks in the first round of the playoffs, the Celtics narrowly lost in Game 1, as Bradley scored 18 points but went down in the fourth quarter with an apparent right hamstring injury. The injury turned out to be serious enough to sideline Bradley for the rest of the series, which turned out to be a crippling blow for the Celtics. They were considerably outplayed by the Hawks in his absence, particularly on offense, and lost the series in six games. However, Bradley's sixth NBA season was both an individual and team success, capped off when he was included in the NBA All-Defensive First Team.

==== 2016–17 season ====
Bradley and the Celtics both continued to improve in 2016–17. Beginning with an opening night 17-point performance that included 3-of-4 three-point shooting, Bradley enjoyed his most effective offensive season, although injuries limited him to just 55 games. Starting every game he played, Bradley was remarkably consistent, with double-digit scoring in 50 of his 55 regular-season contests. At his best, Bradley was an outstanding weapon from three-point range. In the Celtics' third game of the season, for instance, he scored 31 points on a career-high eight three-pointers, also managing 11 rebounds, as the Celtics defeated the Charlotte Hornets. Bradley's season scoring average of 16.3 points per game was a career high, while his 39.0 three-point percentage was his best since 2013–14. Bradley's rebounding totals, meanwhile, saw a dramatic leap, as he averaged 6.1 for the season, nearly double what he ever had before. Bradley managed double-digit rebounds on 10 occasions, including November 16, when he recorded a career-high 13, to go along with 18 points, in a victory over the Dallas Mavericks. Unfortunately, Bradley struggled through several injuries, most notably a right Achilles injury that cost him 22 out of 23 games during a stretch in January and February.

The season was a success for the Celtics, as a 53–29 record earned them the No. 1 seed in the Eastern Conference playoffs. However, in the first round of the postseason, the Celtics initially struggled and fell behind the eighth-seeded Chicago Bulls 2–0. When they managed to win the series in six games, it marked Bradley and the team's first postseason series win since 2012. Bradley scored 24 and 23 points in Games 5 and 6, with the 24 points a playoff career high. He topped that in the next round, with 29 points against the Washington Wizards in Game 5 to help the Celtics take a 3–2 lead in the series, which they ultimately won in seven games. The Celtics' Eastern Conference Finals opponent, the Cleveland Cavaliers, ultimately proved to be too much. In an otherwise one-sided series, the high point for the Celtics came courtesy of Bradley. Playing Game 3 down two games to none and without the injured Isaiah Thomas, Boston stayed unexpectedly close to the Cavaliers throughout the game, then won when Bradley's 3-pointer bounced around the rim and fell with less than a second left. Bradley finished the game with 20 points. The Celtics lost both the fourth and fifth games, bowing out of the playoffs.

=== Detroit Pistons (2017–2018) ===
On July 7, 2017, in a bid to clear enough cap space to sign star free agent Gordon Hayward, as well as an attempt to increase the size of their perimeter defenders, the Celtics traded Bradley and a 2019 second-round draft pick to the Detroit Pistons in exchange for Marcus Morris. Bradley had been the longest tenured Celtic on the team at the time. In his debut for the Pistons in their season opener on October 18, 2017, Bradley scored 15 points in a 102–90 victory over the Charlotte Hornets. On November 15, he scored a season-high 28 points in a 99–95 loss to the Milwaukee Bucks. Bradley missed seven games with a hip-groin injury between late December and early January.

=== Los Angeles Clippers (2018–2019) ===
On January 29, 2018, Bradley, along with Tobias Harris, Boban Marjanović, a future protected first-round draft pick and a future second-round draft pick, was traded to the Los Angeles Clippers in exchange for Blake Griffin, Willie Reed and Brice Johnson. On March 13, he underwent successful surgery to repair adductor and rectus abdominis muscles. Bradley was subsequently ruled out for six to eight weeks.

On July 9, 2018, Bradley re-signed with the Clippers.

=== Memphis Grizzlies (2019) ===
On February 7, 2019, Bradley was traded to the Memphis Grizzlies in exchange for JaMychal Green and Garrett Temple. Five days later, Bradley led Memphis with a career-high 33 points in a narrow 108–107 loss to the San Antonio Spurs.

On July 6, 2019, Bradley was waived by the Grizzlies.

=== Los Angeles Lakers (2019–2020) ===
In July 2019, Bradley signed a two-year deal worth $9.77 million with the Los Angeles Lakers. The 2019–20 season was suspended mid-season due to the COVID-19 pandemic. The season resumed, but Bradley opted out of playing in the restart to remain with his family due to his oldest child, six-year-old son Liam, who had a history of struggling to recover from respiratory illnesses. The Lakers filled his roster spot by signing J. R. Smith. Without Bradley, the Lakers won the 2020 NBA Finals. However, Bradley received a championship ring for the role he played during the 2019–20 regular season. After the season, Bradley declined the $5 million option on the final year of his contract and became a free agent.

=== Miami Heat (2020–2021) ===
On November 23, 2020, Bradley signed with the Miami Heat.

=== Houston Rockets (2021) ===
On March 25, 2021, Bradley, Kelly Olynyk and a 2022 draft pick swap were traded to the Houston Rockets in exchange for Victor Oladipo. The Rockets chose not to pick up his $5.9 million team option which made him a free agent.

=== Golden State Warriors (2021) ===
On September 24, 2021, Bradley signed with the Golden State Warriors. However, he was waived on October 15 after four preseason games.

=== Return to the Lakers (2021–2022) ===
On October 18, 2021, Bradley was claimed off waivers by the Lakers. On December 10, he registered a season-high 22 points, alongside four steals, in a 116–95 victory over the Oklahoma City Thunder. Bradley made 62 appearances (including 45 starts) for Los Angeles, recording averages of 6.4 points, 2.2 rebounds, and 0.8 assists.

== Player profile ==
Although he had a build more typical of a point guard, Bradley played the shooting guard position. Making up for his lack of size at the position with quickness, strength and tenacity, Bradley excelled at defense. Opponents Damian Lillard and CJ McCollum called him the best perimeter defender in the NBA. Bradley had outstanding athleticism and explosiveness, having won the Slam Dunk Contest at the 2009 McDonald's All-American Game. However, he rarely displayed his elite leaping ability in games, occasionally blocking players at the rim or throwing down dunks but more often simply harassing his man on the perimeter and settling for layups. Bradley's intense and frenetic defensive style of play, probably his most valuable asset, may also be partly to blame for the series of injuries he suffered in his career. However, Bradley's most serious injuries, which required three surgeries by the time he was 23, happened early in his career. Due to his defense and his offensive improvement, Bradley became an increasingly important member of the Celtics during his tenure there, and his minutes played per game steadily increased over his time with the team, from just 5.2 to 33.4.

== Career statistics ==
Legend
GP	Games played	GS	Games started	MPG	Minutes per game
FG%	Field goal percentage	3P%	3-point field goal percentage	FT%	Free throw percentage
RPG	Rebounds per game	APG	Assists per game	SPG	Steals per game
BPG	Blocks per game	PPG	Points per game	**Bold**	Career high
†	Won an NBA championship

=== NBA ===
==== Regular season ====
Year	Team	GP	GS	MPG	FG%	3P%	FT%	RPG	APG	SPG	BPG	PPG
2010–11	Boston	31	0	5.2	.343	.000	.500	.5	.4	.3	.0	1.7
2011–12	Boston	64	28	21.4	**.498**	.407	.795	1.8	1.4	.7	.2	7.6
2012–13	Boston	50	50	28.7	.402	.317	.755	2.2	2.1	1.3	**.4**	9.2
2013–14	Boston	60	58	30.9	.438	.395	.804	3.8	1.4	1.1	.2	14.9
2014–15	Boston	**77**	**77**	31.5	.429	.352	.790	3.1	1.8	1.1	.2	13.9
2015–16	Boston	76	72	**33.4**	.447	.361	.780	2.9	2.1	**1.5**	.3	15.2
2016–17	Boston	55	55	**33.4**	.463	.390	.731	**6.1**	2.2	1.2	.2	**16.3**
2017–18	Detroit	40	40	31.7	.409	.381	.763	2.4	2.1	1.2	.2	15.0
2017–18	L.A. Clippers	6	6	27.5	.473	.111	**1.000**	3.7	1.8	.8	.2	9.2
2018–19	L.A. Clippers	49	49	29.9	.383	.337	.800	2.7	2.0	.6	.3	8.2
2018–19	Memphis	14	14	31.6	.463	.384	.920	3.1	**4.0**	1.0	.0	16.1
2019–20†	L.A. Lakers	49	44	24.2	.444	.364	.833	2.3	1.3	.9	.1	8.6
2020–21	Miami	10	1	21.1	.470	**.421**	.778	1.8	1.4	.7	.1	8.5
2020–21	Houston	17	5	23.0	.314	.270	.833	2.3	1.9	.8	.1	5.2
2021–22	L.A. Lakers	62	45	22.7	.423	.390	.889	2.2	.8	.9	.1	6.4
Career		660	544	27.5	.434	.365	.783	2.8	1.7	1.0	.2	11.0

==== Playoffs ====
Year	Team	GP	GS	MPG	FG%	3P%	FT%	RPG	APG	SPG	BPG	PPG
2012	Boston	10	10	24.8	.368	.227	.667	2.0	.8	.8	.6	6.7
2013	Boston	6	6	31.8	.405	.250	**1.000**	2.2	1.3	**1.8**	.2	6.7
2015	Boston	4	4	33.3	.380	.263	.857	3.8	.8	.8	.0	12.3
2016	Boston	1	1	33.0	.438	.143	**1.000**	3.0	1.0	1.0	**1.0**	**18.0**
2017	Boston	**18**	**18**	**35.8**	**.441**	**.351**	.778	**3.9**	**2.3**	1.3	.2	16.7
Career		39	39	32.1	.420	.312	.780	3.1	1.6	1.2	.3	12.2

=== College ===
Year	Team	GP	GS	MPG	FG%	3P%	FT%	RPG	APG	SPG	BPG	PPG
2009–10	Texas	34	32	29.5	.432	.375	.545	2.9	2.1	1.3	.5	11.6

== Post-playing career ==
On April 16, 2024, Bradley was named Vice President of Player Development by the Utah Jazz.

== Personal life ==
Bradley has a son, Avery III, who was born just two weeks after Bradley's mother died, in September 2013. He began hosting a basketball camp, the Avery Bradley Skills Academy, for Boston-area children in the summer of 2014.

=== Legal troubles ===
In December 2017, Bradley reached a settlement with a woman he allegedly sexually assaulted on May 23 of that year, while Bradley was in Cleveland with the Boston Celtics. He denied the allegations.
