= Oleynik =

Oleynik, also Oleinik (Russian: Олейник) is a Russian-language occupational surname: the word олей (archaic in Russian, variously spelled in other Slavic languages) means vegetable oil, and 'oleynik' is a person who manufactures or sells oil. Notable people with the surname include:

- Aleksandr Oleinik (born 1982), Russian footballer
- Aleksei Oleinik (born 1977), Russian mixed martial artist and combat sambo fighter
- Alexander Oleinik (kickboxer), Ukrainian kickboxer
- Anatoly Oleynik, Russian professor of chemistry
- Larisa Oleynik (born 1981), American actress
- Olga Arsenievna Oleinik (1925–2001), Soviet mathematician
- Frank Oleynick (born 1955), American retired basketball player

== See also ==
- Olynyk
- Olenik
- Olejnik, Polish version
- Oliynyk, Ukrainian version
- Oleynikov
