= 2014–15 Boston Celtics season =

Season of National Basketball Association team the Boston Celtic

- Head coach: Brad Stevens
- General manager: Danny Ainge
- Owners: Boston Basketball Partners
- Arena: TD Garden

Results
- Record: 40–42 (.488)
- Place: Division: 2nd (Atlantic); Conference: 7th (Eastern)
- Playoff finish: First Round (lost to Cavaliers 0–4)
- Stats at Basketball Reference

Local media
- Television: Comcast SportsNet New England
- Radio: WBZ-FM

The 2014–15 Boston Celtics season was the 69th season of the franchise in the National Basketball Association (NBA)., The Boston Celtics finished the regular season with a 40–42 win-loss record, which was the second best in the Atlantic division.

The Celtics made several transactions during the season. Rajon Rondo was traded to the Dallas Mavericks on December 18, 2014, Austin Rivers was acquired from the New Orleans Pelicans on January 12, but three days later, he was again traded to the Los Angeles Clippers after refusing to suit up for the Celtics, and in February, Isaiah Thomas was acquired from the Phoenix Suns.

On March 9, 2015, the Celtics passed the previous season's win total of 25 with a 100–90 win over the Miami Heat.

On April 13, 2015, the Celtics qualified for the playoffs for the seventh time in the last eight seasons and for the first time since 2013. Their season ended after being swept in the first round playoff series by the eventual Conference champion Cleveland Cavaliers. As of 2026, this was the last time the Celtics finished below .500 or got swept in the playoffs.

== Preseason ==
=== Draft ===
Round	Pick	Player	Position	Nationality	College
1	6	Marcus Smart	PG	United States	Oklahoma State
1	17	James Young	SG	United States	Kentucky

== Regular season ==
=== Standings ===
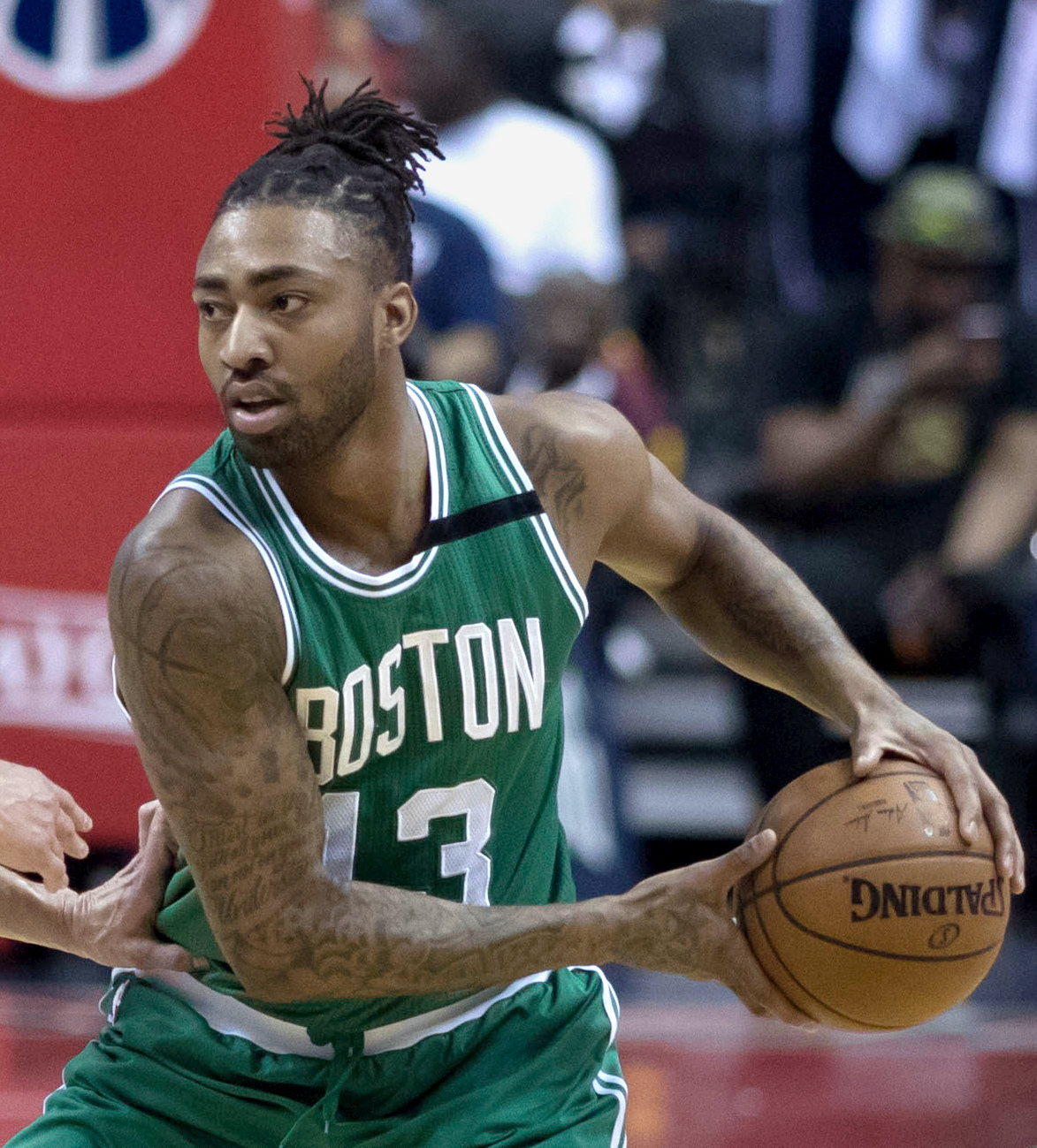
James Young

Atlantic Division	W	L	PCT	GB	Home	Road	Div	GP
y-Toronto Raptors	49	33	.598	–	27‍–‍14	22‍–‍19	11–5	82
x-Boston Celtics	40	42	.488	9.0	21‍–‍20	19‍–‍22	12–4	82
x-Brooklyn Nets	38	44	.463	11.0	19‍–‍22	19‍–‍22	10–6	82
Philadelphia 76ers	18	64	.220	31.0	12‍–‍29	6‍–‍35	2–14	82
New York Knicks	17	65	.207	32.0	10‍–‍31	7‍–‍34	5–11	82

Eastern Conference
#	Team	W	L	PCT	GB	GP
1	c-Atlanta Hawks *	60	22	.732	–	82
2	y-Cleveland Cavaliers *	53	29	.646	7.0	82
3	x-Chicago Bulls	50	32	.610	10.0	82
4	y-Toronto Raptors *	49	33	.598	11.0	82
5	x-Washington Wizards	46	36	.561	14.0	82
6	x-Milwaukee Bucks	41	41	.500	19.0	82
7	x-Boston Celtics	40	42	.488	20.0	82
8	x-Brooklyn Nets	38	44	.463	22.0	82
9	Indiana Pacers	38	44	.463	22.0	82
10	Miami Heat	37	45	.451	23.0	82
11	Charlotte Hornets	33	49	.402	27.0	82
12	Detroit Pistons	32	50	.390	28.0	82
13	Orlando Magic	25	57	.305	35.0	82
14	Philadelphia 76ers	18	64	.220	42.0	82
15	New York Knicks	17	65	.207	43.0	82

== Game log ==
=== Preseason game log ===
2014 pre-season game log
Total: 7–1 (home: 5–0; road: 2–1)
Pre-season: 7–1 (home: 5–0; road: 2–1)

Game	Date	Team	Score	High points	High rebounds	High assists	Location Attendance	Record
1	October 6	Philadelphia	W 92–88	Evan Turner (25)	Jared Sullinger (16)	Evan Turner (10)	TD Garden; 14,143	1–0
2	October 8	New York	W 117–89	Jared Sullinger (33)	Jared Sullinger (7)	Marcus Smart (12)	XL Center; 8,462	2–0
3	October 10	@ Toronto	L 109–133	Avery Bradley (25)	Jared Sullinger (9)	Jared Sullinger (17)	Air Canada Centre; 16,729	2–1
4	October 11	New York	W 99–96	Marcus Smart (25)	Jared Sullinger (9)	Evan Turner (13)	Mohegan Sun Arena; 9,252	3–1
5	October 15	Toronto	W 102–92	Marcus Thornton (27)	Jared Sullinger (15)	Evan Turner (18)	Cumberland County Civic Center; 5,909	4–1
6	October 16	@ Philadelphia	W 113–92	Jared Sullinger (41)	Jared Sullinger (12)	Rajon Rondo (10)	Wells Fargo Center; 8,201	5–1
7	October 19	@ Brooklyn	W 99–91	Jared Sullinger (24)	Jared Sullinger (20)	Marcus Smart (14)	Barclays Center; 13,787	6–1
8	October 22	Brooklyn	W 109–86	Marcus Smart (27)	Jared Sullinger (27)	Phil Pressey (15)	TD Garden; 15,508	7–1

2014–15 season schedule

=== Regular season game log ===
2014–15 game log
Total: 40–42 (home: 21–20; road: 19–22)
October: 1–0 (home: 1–0; road: 0–0)

Game	Date	Team	Score	High points	High rebounds	High assists	Location Attendance	Record
1	October 29	Brooklyn	W 121–105	Kelly Olynyk (19)	Rondo & Turner (7)	Rajon Rondo (12)	TD Garden; 18,624	1–0

November : 3–10 (home: 1–7; road: 2–3)

Game	Date	Team	Score	High points	High rebounds	High assists	Location Attendance	Record
2	November 1	@ Houston	L 90–104	Jeff Green (17)	Rajon Rondo (8)	Rajon Rondo (10)	Toyota Center; 18,309	1–1
3	November 3	@ Dallas	L 113–118	Jeff Green (35)	Rajon Rondo (9)	Rajon Rondo (15)	American Airlines Center; 19,948	1–2
4	November 5	Toronto	L 107–110	Jeff Green (20)	Jared Sullinger (16)	Rajon Rondo (15)	TD Garden; 16,249	1–3
5	November 7	Indiana	W 101–98	Jared Sullinger (17)	Jeff Green (7)	Rajon Rondo (6)	TD Garden; 17,122	2–3
6	November 8	@ Chicago	W 106–101	Evan Turner (19)	Kelly Olynyk (11)	Evan Turner (6)	United Center; 22,104	3–3
7	November 12	Oklahoma City	L 94–109	Rajon Rondo (20)	Jared Sullinger (11)	Rajon Rondo (12)	TD Garden; 17,043	3–4
8	November 14	Cleveland	L 121–122	Kelly Olynyk (21)	Jared Sullinger (10)	Rajon Rondo (16)	TD Garden; 18,624	3–5
9	November 17	Phoenix	L 114–118	Jeff Green (28)	Rajon Rondo (10)	Rajon Rondo (9)	TD Garden; 16,726	3–6
10	November 19	@ Philadelphia	W 101–90	Brandon Bass (23)	Jeff Green (10)	Rajon Rondo (13)	Wells Fargo Center; 12,701	4–6
11	November 21	@ Memphis	L 100–117	Kelly Olynyk (18)	Olynyk, Green, Sullinger & Turner (6)	Evan Turner (5)	FedExForum; 17,712	4–7
12	November 23	Portland	L 88–94	Green, Sullinger (19)	Kelly Olynyk (6)	Rajon Rondo (8)	TD Garden; 16,692	4–8
13	November 28	Chicago	L 102–109	Jared Sullinger (23)	Jared Sullinger (10)	Rajon Rondo (9)	TD Garden; 18,203	4–9
14	November 30	San Antonio	L 89–111	Jeff Green (16)	Tyler Zeller (10)	Rajon Rondo (10)	TD Garden; 17,121	4–10

December : 7–8 (home: 6–2; road: 1–6)

Game	Date	Team	Score	High points	High rebounds	High assists	Location Attendance	Record
15	December 2	@ Atlanta	L 105–109	Jeff Green (25)	Rajon Rondo (12)	Rajon Rondo (19)	Philips Arena; 12,705	4–11
16	December 3	Detroit	W 109–102 (OT)	Jeff Green (32)	Tyler Zeller (10)	Rajon Rondo (8)	TD Garden; 15,870	5–11
17	December 5	L.A. Lakers	W 113–96	Tyler Zeller (24)	Tyler Zeller (14)	Rajon Rondo (16)	TD Garden; 18,624	6–11
18	December 7	Washington	W 101–93	Jeff Green (25)	Rajon Rondo (13)	Rajon Rondo (11)	TD Garden; 16,716	7–11
19	December 8	@ Washington	L 132–133 (2OT)	Jeff Green (28)	Kelly Olynyk (11)	Evan Turner (8)	Verizon Center; 14,828	7–12
20	December 10	@ Charlotte	L 87–96	Green, Thornton (16)	Rajon Rondo (10)	Rajon Rondo (10)	Time Warner Cable Arena; 15,276	7–13
21	December 12	New York	L 95–101	Jeff Green (28)	Rajon Rondo (7)	Rajon Rondo (10)	TD Garden; 17,989	7–14
22	December 15	@ Philadelphia	W 105–87	Kelly Olynyk (30)	Jared Sullinger (11)	Rajon Rondo (7)	Wells Fargo Center; 12,903	8–14
23	December 17	Orlando	W 109–92	Brandon Bass (18)	Zeller, Rondo (7)	Rajon Rondo (15)	TD Garden; 16,764	9–14
24	December 19	Minnesota	W 114–98	Kelly Olynyk (21)	Jared Sullinger (10)	Avery Bradley (7)	TD Garden; 17,042	10–14
25	December 21	@ Miami	L 84–100	Tyler Zeller (22)	Tyler Zeller (8)	Olynyk, Bradley, & Smart (4)	American Airlines Arena; 19,720	10–15
26	December 23	@ Orlando	L 95–100	Tyler Zeller (22)	Tyler Zeller (10)	Jameer Nelson (11)	Amway Center; 17,489	10–16
27	December 26	Brooklyn	L 107–109	Jeff Green (22)	Tyler Zeller (9)	Marcus Smart (6)	TD Garden; 18,624	10–17
28	December 27	@ Washington	L 88–101	Jeff Green (23)	Kelly Olynyk (8)	Evan Turner (4)	Verizon Center; 20,356	10–18
29	December 31	Sacramento	W 106–84	Jared Sullinger (20)	Jared Sullinger (11)	Evan Turner (11)	TD Garden; 18,624	11–18

January : 5–11 (home: 1–5; road: 4–6)

Game	Date	Team	Score	High points	High rebounds	High assists	Location Attendance	Record
30	January 2	Dallas	L 101–119	Avery Bradley (22)	Tyler Zeller (10)	Marcus Smart (7)	TD Garden; 18,624	11–19
31	January 3	@ Chicago	L 104–109	Evan Turner (29)	Jared Sullinger (16)	Evan Turner (6)	United Center; 21,820	11–20
32	January 5	Charlotte	L 95–104	Jared Sullinger (22)	Jared Sullinger (8)	Turner, Bass, & Smart (4)	TD Garden; 16,720	11–21
33	January 7	@ Brooklyn	W 89–81	Avery Bradley (21)	Evan Turner (7)	Evan Turner (8)	Barclays Center; 16,005	12–21
34	January 9	@ Indiana	L 103–107 (OT)	Avery Bradley (23)	Evan Turner (15)	Evan Turner (7)	Bankers Life Fieldhouse; 18,165	12–22
35	January 10	@ Toronto	L 96–109	Kelly Olynyk (23)	Jared Sullinger (10)	Evan Turner (5)	Air Canada Centre; 19,800	12–23
36	January 12	New Orleans	W 108–100	Jared Sullinger (27)	Jared Sullinger (10)	Marcus Smart (6)	TD Garden; 16,905	13–23
37	January 14	Atlanta	L 91–105	Avery Bradley (17)	Jared Sullinger (9)	Evan Turner (6)	TD Garden; 16,067	13–24
38	January 16	Chicago	L 103–119	Jared Sullinger (20)	Kelly Olynyk (9)	Evan Turner (8)	TD Garden; 18,624	13–25
39	January 19	@ L.A. Clippers	L 93–102	Brandon Bass (17)	Evan Turner (10)	Marcus Smart (7)	Staples Center; 19,060	13–26
40	January 22	@ Portland	W 90–89	Avery Bradley (18)	Brandon Bass (10)	Evan Turner (8)	Moda Center; 19,567	14–26
41	January 23	@ Denver	W 100–99	Avery Bradley (18)	Brandon Bass (9)	Evan Turner (6)	Pepsi Center; 16,133	15–26
42	January 25	@ Golden State	L 111–114	Jared Sullinger (25)	Sullinger, Bass (9)	Evan Turner (7)	Oracle Arena; 19,596	15–27
43	January 26	@ Utah	W 99–90	Tayshaun Prince (19)	Jared Sullinger (9)	Prince, Smart (5)	EnergySolutions Arena; 18,947	16–27
44	January 28	@ Minnesota	L 98–110	Jared Sullinger (16)	Tyler Zeller (9)	Turner, Smart (6)	Target Center; 11,434	16–28
45	January 30	Houston	L 87–93	Bass, Thornton (17)	Tyler Zeller (11)	Sullinger, Smart (4)	TD Garden; 17,675	16–29

February : 7–4 (home: 5–1; road: 2–3)

Game	Date	Team	Score	High points	High rebounds	High assists	Location Attendance	Record
46	February 1	Miami	L 75–83	Bradley, Zeller (17)	Bass, Zeller (6)	Marcus Smart (9)	TD Garden; 17,366	16–30
47	February 3	@ New York	W 108–97	Avery Bradley (26)	Jared Sullinger (9)	Jared Sullinger (6)	Madison Square Garden; 17,366	17–30
48	February 4	Denver	W 104–100	Bradley, Thornton (17)	Marcus Smart (10)	Turner, Smart (8)	TD Garden; 15,126	18–30
49	February 6	Philadelphia	W 107–96	Jared Sullinger (22)	Tyler Zeller (9)	Marcus Smart (8)	TD Garden; 18,322	19–30
50	February 7	@ Milwaukee	L 93–96	Jared Sullinger (17)	Jared Sullinger (7)	Evan Turner (7)	BMO Harris Bradley Center; 16,470	19–31
51	February 11	Atlanta	W 89–88	Jared Sullinger (17)	Jared Sullinger (15)	Evan Turner (9)	TD Garden; 16,083	20–31
All-Star Break
52	February 20	@ Sacramento	L 101–109	Avery Bradley (28)	Brandon Bass (10)	Evan Turner (9)	Sleep Train Arena; 17,317	20–32
53	February 22	@ L.A. Lakers	L 111–118 (OT)	Avery Bradley (20)	Tyler Zeller (11)	Evan Turner (12)	Staples Center; 18,997	20–33
54	February 23	@ Phoenix	W 115–110	Avery Bradley (20)	Evan Turner (12)	Isaiah Thomas (7)	US Airways Center; 17,076	21–33
55	February 25	New York	W 115–94	Jonas Jerebko (20)	Evan Turner (12)	Evan Turner (10)	TD Garden; 16,899	22–33
56	February 27	Charlotte	W 106–98	Isaiah Thomas (28)	Jonas Jerebko (10)	Thomas, Turner (7)	TD Garden; 18,624	23–33

March : 10–8 (home: 4–4; road: 6–4)

Game	Date	Team	Score	High points	High rebounds	High assists	Location Attendance	Record
57	March 1	Golden State	L 101–106	Isaiah Thomas (20)	Jae Crowder (17)	Evan Turner (6)	TD Garden; 18,624	23–34
58	March 3	@ Cleveland	L 79–110	Brandon Bass (15)	5 players (5)	Evan Turner (7)	Quicken Loans Arena; 20,562	23–35
59	March 4	Utah	W 85–84	Isaiah Thomas (21)	Tyler Zeller (11)	Isaiah Thomas (7)	TD Garden; 16,354	24–35
60	March 6	@ New Orleans	W 104–98	Isaiah Thomas (27)	Jae Crowder (9)	Evan Turner (6)	Smoothie King Center; 17,274	25–35
61	March 8	@ Orlando	L 98–103	Isaiah Thomas (21)	Brandon Bass (17)	Isaiah Thomas (9)	Amway Center; 17,041	25–36
62	March 9	@ Miami	W 100–90	Isaiah Thomas (25)	Brandon Bass (9)	Thomas, Bass (4)	American Airlines Arena; 19,600	26–36
63	March 11	Memphis	W 95–92	Avery Bradley (17)	Tyler Zeller (9)	Evan Turner (7)	TD Garden; 17,135	27–36
64	March 13	Orlando	W 95–88	Evan Turner (30)	Brandon Bass (7)	Phil Pressey (10)	TD Garden; 18,624	28–36
65	March 14	@ Indiana	W 93–89	Tyler Zeller (18)	Evan Turner (7)	Turner, Smart, Zeller, Crowder (7)	Bankers Life Fieldhouse; 18,165	29–36
66	March 16	Philadelphia	W 108–89	Tyler Zeller (26)	Avery Bradley (10)	Avery Bradley (6)	TD Garden; 16,553	30–36
67	March 18	@ Oklahoma City	L 118–122	Marcus Smart (25)	Smart, Crowder (9)	Evan Turner (10)	Chesapeake Energy Arena; 18,203	30–37
68	March 20	@ San Antonio	L 89–101	Evan Turner (17)	Jonas Jerebko (12)	Smart, Turner (4)	AT&T Center; 18,581	30–38
69	March 22	Detroit	L 97–105 (OT)	Evan Turner (22)	Bass, Jerebko, Olynyk (9)	Evan Turner (8)	TD Garden; 18,624	30–39
70	March 23	@ Brooklyn	W 110–91	Avery Bradley (20)	Evan Turner (10)	Evan Turner (12)	Barclays Center; 16,814	31–39
71	March 25	Miami	L 86–93	Jae Crowder (16)	Tyler Zeller (8)	Phil Pressey (6)	TD Garden; 18,624	31–40
72	March 27	@ New York	W 96–92	Isaiah Thomas (18)	Brandon Bass (10)	Isaiah Thomas (6)	Madison Square Garden; 19,812	32–40
73	March 29	L.A. Clippers	L 106–119	Isaiah Thomas (19)	Jonas Jerebko (8)	Evan Turner (10)	TD Garden; 18,624	32–41
74	March 30	@ Charlotte	W 116–104	Avery Bradley (30)	Avery Bradley (8)	Isaiah Thomas (7)	Time Warner Cable Arena; 15,140	33–41

April : 7–1 (home: 3–1; road: 4–0)

Game	Date	Team	Score	High points	High rebounds	High assists	Location Attendance	Record
75	April 1	Indiana	W 100–87	Olynyk & Zeller (19)	Evan Turner (11)	Evan Turner (12)	TD Garden; 18,624	34–41
76	April 3	Milwaukee	L 101–110	Isaiah Thomas (23)	Tyler Zeller (7)	Thomas & Turner (6)	TD Garden; 18,624	34–42
77	April 4	@ Toronto	W 117–116 (OT)	Isaiah Thomas (25)	Tyler Zeller (9)	Evan Turner (10)	Air Canada Centre; 19,800	35–42
78	April 8	@ Detroit	W 113–103	Isaiah Thomas (34)	Tyler Zeller (6)	Isaiah Thomas (6)	The Palace of Auburn Hills; 14,284	36–42
79	April 10	@ Cleveland	W 99–90	Marcus Smart (19)	Jared Sullinger (8)	Evan Turner (13)	Quicken Loans Arena; 20,562	37–42
80	April 12	Cleveland	W 117–78	Isaiah Thomas (17)	Crowder & Olynyk & Turner (7)	Isaiah Thomas (6)	TD Garden; 18,624	38–42
81	April 14	Toronto	W 95–93	Turner, Bradley (14)	Brandon Bass (9)	Evan Turner (9)	TD Garden; 18,624	39–42
82	April 15	@ Milwaukee	W 105–100	Luigi Datome (22)	Jonas Jerebko (6)	Phil Pressey (7)	BMO Harris Bradley Center; 17,316	40–42

2014–15 season schedule

== Playoffs ==
=== Game log ===
2015 playoff game log
Total: 0–4 (home: 0–2; road: 0–2)
First Round: 0–4 (home: 0–2; road: 0–2)

Game	Date	Team	Score	High points	High rebounds	High assists	Location Attendance	Series
1	April 19	@ Cleveland	L 100–113	Isaiah Thomas (22)	Evan Turner (7)	Isaiah Thomas (10)	Quicken Loans Arena; 20,562	0–1
2	April 21	@ Cleveland	L 91–99	Isaiah Thomas (22)	Evan Turner (12)	Isaiah Thomas (7)	Quicken Loans Arena; 20,562	0–2
3	April 23	Cleveland	L 95–103	Evan Turner (19)	Turner, Sullinger (8)	Evan Turner (8)	TD Garden; 18,624	0–3
4	April 26	Cleveland	L 93–101	Thomas, Sullinger (21)	Jared Sullinger (11)	Isaiah Thomas (9)	TD Garden; 18,624	0–4

2015 playoff schedule

== Player statistics ==
Statistics (Summer League, preseason, and regular season)

Legend
GP	Games played	GS	Games started	MPG	Minutes per game
FG%	Field-goal percentage	3P%	3-point field-goal percentage	FT%	Free-throw percentage
RPG	Rebounds per game	APG	Assists per game	SPG	Steals per game
BPG	Blocks per game	PPG	Points per game

=== Summer League ===
Boston Celtics statistics
Player	GP	GS	MPG	FG%	3P%	FT%	RPG	APG	SPG	BPG	PPG
O. D. Anosike	4	0	13.5	.857	.000	.333	4.8	0.0	1.0	0.5	3.5
Chris Babb	5	2	20.0	.346	.188	.800	2.0	1.6	0.4	0.0	5.0
Dairis Bertāns	3	0	12.3	.667	.429	.250	1.7	1.0	0.0	0.0	6.7
Daniel Coursey	0	0	0.0	.000	.000	.000	0.0	0.0	0.0	0.0	0.0
Colton Iverson	5	3	15.8	.650	.000	.667	2.4	0.4	0.2	0.6	6.4
Edwin Jackson	4	0	12.0	.333	.250	1.000	1.3	1.0	0.3	0.0	6.8
Chris Johnson	5	5	23.8	.306	.188	.727	4.2	1.0	0.4	0.6	6.6
Mike Moser	5	3	26.2	.451	.423	.733	4.8	2.0	2.0	1.0	13.6
Devin Oliver	4	0	4.5	.000	.000	.000	1.8	0.0	1.0	0.0	0.0
Kelly Olynyk	4	4	32.5	.400	.278	.765	7.3	2.0	2.0	0.0	17.5
Phil Pressey	5	3	27.4	.322	.200	.733	3.8	5.4	2.2	0.0	10.6
Marcus Smart	5	5	29.2	.294	.257	.833	4.2	4.2	2.0	0.4	14.8
James Young	0	0	0.0	.000	.000	.000	0.0	0.0	0.0	0.0	0.0

Source: NBA.com

=== Preseason ===
Boston Celtics statistics
Player	GP	GS	MPG	FG%	3P%	FT%	RPG	APG	SPG	BPG	PPG

=== Regular season ===
Boston Celtics statistics
Player	GP	GS	MPG	FG%	3P%	FT%	RPG	APG	SPG	BPG	PPG
Tyler Zeller	82	59	21.1	.549		.823	5.7	1.4	.2	.6	10.2
Evan Turner	82	57	27.6	.429	.277	.752	5.1	5.5	1.0	.2	9.5
Brandon Bass	82	43	23.5	.504	.281	.790	4.9	1.3	.5	.4	10.6
Avery Bradley	77	77	31.5	.429	.352	.790	3.1	1.8	1.1	.2	13.9
Marcus Smart	67	38	27.0	.367	.335	.646	3.3	3.1	1.5	.3	7.8
Kelly Olynyk	64	13	22.2	.475	.349	.684	4.7	1.7	1.0	.6	10.3
Jared Sullinger	58	49	27.0	.439	.283	.744	7.6	2.3	.8	.7	13.3
Jae Crowder^{†}	57	17	24.2	.418	.282	.762	4.6	1.4	1.0	.4	9.5
Phil Pressey	50	0	12.0	.368	.246	.673	1.6	2.3	.6	.1	3.5
Marcus Thornton^{†}	39	0	16.4	.416	.419	.824	1.9	.9	.5	.2	8.9
Jeff Green^{†}	33	33	33.1	.434	.305	.840	4.3	1.6	.8	.4	17.6
Gerald Wallace	32	0	8.9	.412	.333	.400	1.8	.3	.5	.1	1.1
James Young	31	0	10.7	.353	.258	.552	1.4	.4	.3	.1	3.4
Jonas Jerebko^{†}	29	0	18.2	.431	.406	.833	4.8	1.0	.7	.2	7.1
Rajon Rondo^{†}	22	22	31.8	.405	.250	.333	7.5	10.8	1.7	.1	8.3
Isaiah Thomas^{†}	21	0	26.0	.411	.345	.861	2.1	5.4	.6	.0	19.0
Luigi Datome^{†}	18	1	10.7	.494	.472	1.000	1.4	.4	.1	.4	5.2
Tayshaun Prince^{†}	9	0	22.0	.559	.625	.833	3.3	2.0	.6	.2	8.4
Brandan Wright^{†}	8	0	10.8	.571		.500	2.1	1.0	.1	.6	3.3
Jameer Nelson^{†}	6	1	20.2	.220	.200	.667	2.8	5.5	1.2	.0	4.8
Shavlik Randolph^{†}	5	0	5.0	.300	.000	.500	2.4	.2	.2	.2	1.4
Dwight Powell^{†}	5	0	1.8	.800		.500	.2	.0	.4	.0	1.8

=== Playoffs ===
Boston Celtics statistics
Player	GP	GS	MPG	FG%	3P%	FT%	RPG	APG	SPG	BPG	PPG
Avery Bradley	4	4	33.3	.380	.263	.857	3.8	.8	.8	.0	12.3
Evan Turner	4	4	29.5	.364	.500	.889	7.3	4.8	.8	.0	10.5
Tyler Zeller	4	4	22.5	.517		.800	4.5	.5	.5	.3	8.5
Brandon Bass	4	4	21.5	.350		.600	2.0	2.5	.3	.8	5.0
Marcus Smart	4	3	22.5	.483	.231	.533	2.8	1.3	.3	.3	9.8
Jae Crowder	4	1	25.0	.517	.300	.769	5.0	2.0	1.0	.8	10.8
Isaiah Thomas	4	0	29.8	.333	.167	.969	3.0	7.0	.8	.0	17.5
Jared Sullinger	4	0	20.0	.553	.333	.571	7.0	.3	.0	.8	12.3
Jonas Jerebko	4	0	17.0	.333	.000	.500	3.5	.3	.5	.3	2.8
Kelly Olynyk	4	0	13.3	.538	.500	.500	1.3	.5	.5	.5	4.5
Luigi Datome	3	0	4.7	.333	.000		.3	.3	.0	.0	1.3
Phil Pressey	2	0	2.5	.000	.000		.5	.0	.0	.5	.0
Gerald Wallace	1	0	4.0	.000			1.0	.0	.0	.0	.0

- ^{†} Denotes player spent time with another team in the season. Stats reflect time with the Celtics only.

== Injuries ==
Player	Duration		Injury type	Games missed
Player	Start	End	Injury type	Games missed
Jared Sullinger	2015-02-19	2015–4–3	Foot	24

== Roster ==
2014–15 Boston Celtics roster
Players

Pos.	No.	Player	Height	Weight	DOB	From
G	52	Chris Babb	6 ft 5 in (1.96 m)	225 lb (102 kg)	1990–02–14	Iowa State
F	30	Brandon Bass	6 ft 8 in (2.03 m)	250 lb (113 kg)	1985–04–30	LSU
G	0	Avery Bradley	6 ft 2 in (1.88 m)	180 lb (82 kg)	1990–11–26	Texas
F	99	Jae Crowder	6 ft 6 in (1.98 m)	235 lb (107 kg)	1990–07–06	Marquette
F	70	Luigi Datome	6 ft 8 in (2.03 m)	215 lb (98 kg)	1987–11–27	Italy
F	8	Jonas Jerebko	6 ft 10 in (2.08 m)	231 lb (105 kg)	1987–03–02	Sweden
F/C	41	Kelly Olynyk	7 ft 0 in (2.13 m)	238 lb (108 kg)	1991–04–19	Gonzaga
G	26	Phil Pressey	5 ft 11 in (1.80 m)	175 lb (79 kg)	1991–02–17	Missouri
G	36	Marcus Smart	6 ft 4 in (1.93 m)	220 lb (100 kg)	1994–03–06	Oklahoma State
F	7	Jared Sullinger	6 ft 9 in (2.06 m)	260 lb (118 kg)	1992–03–04	Ohio State
G	4	Isaiah Thomas	5 ft 9 in (1.75 m)	185 lb (84 kg)	1989–02–07	Washington
G/F	11	Evan Turner	6 ft 7 in (2.01 m)	220 lb (100 kg)	1988–10–27	Ohio State
F	45	Gerald Wallace	6 ft 7 in (2.01 m)	220 lb (100 kg)	1982–07–23	Alabama
G/F	13	James Young	6 ft 6 in (1.98 m)	215 lb (98 kg)	1995–08–16	Kentucky
F/C	44	Tyler Zeller	7 ft 0 in (2.13 m)	253 lb (115 kg)	1990–01–17	North Carolina

Coaches
Head coach
- Brad Stevens
Assistant(s)
- Darren Erman
- Jay Larranaga
- Walter McCarty
- Micah Shrewsberry
- Jamie Young

Legend
- (DP) Unsigned draft pick
- (FA) Free agent
- (S) Suspended
- (DL) On assignment to D-League affiliate
- Injured

Roster
Updated: 2015–04–12

== Transactions ==
=== Trades ===
July 10, 2014	Three-team trade
July 10, 2014	To Boston Celtics Marcus Thornton (Brooklyn) Tyler Zeller (Cleveland)	To Brooklyn Nets Jarrett Jack (from Cleveland) Sergey Karasev (from Cleveland)
July 10, 2014	To Cleveland Cavaliers Draft rights to İlkan Karaman (Brooklyn) Draft rights to Edin Bavčić (Brooklyn) Future conditional second round pick (Boston)
July 19, 2014	To Boston Celtics Future conditional second-round pick Trade exception	To Washington Wizards Kris Humphries (sign and trade)
December 18, 2014	To Boston Celtics Jameer Nelson Jae Crowder Brandan Wright 2015 first-round pick 2016 second-round pick $12.9 million trade exception	To Dallas Mavericks Rajon Rondo Dwight Powell
January 9, 2015	To Boston Celtics Protected 2015 first-round pick	To Phoenix Suns Brandan Wright
January 12	Three-team trade
January 12	To Boston Celtics Tayshaun Prince (from Memphis) Austin Rivers (from New Orleans) Future first-round pick (from Memphis)	To Memphis Grizzlies Jeff Green (from Boston) Russ Smith (from New Orleans) Trade exception
January 12	To New Orleans Pelicans Quincy Pondexter (from Memphis) 2015 second-round pick (from Memphis)
January 13	To Boston Celtics Nate Robinson	To Denver Nuggets Jameer Nelson
January 15	Three-team trade
January 15	To Boston Celtics Shavlik Randolph (from Phoenix) Chris Douglas-Roberts (from Los Angeles) 2017 second-round pick (from Los Angeles) $2.4 million trade exception	To Los Angeles Clippers Austin Rivers (from Boston)
January 15	To Phoenix Suns Reggie Bullock (from Los Angeles)
February 19	To Boston Celtics Isaiah Thomas	To Phoenix Suns Marcus Thornton 2016 first-round pick
February 19	To Boston Celtics Jonas Jerebko Luigi Datome	To Detroit Pistons Tayshaun Prince

=== Free agents ===
==== Re-signed ====
Player	Signed	Contract	Ref.
Avery Bradley	July 15, 2014	Undisclosed	

==== Additions ====
Player	Signed	Former team	Ref.
Evan Turner	September 19, 2014	Indiana Pacers	

==== Subtractions ====
Player	Reason left	Date	New team	Ref.
