= Olejnik =

Olejnik is a Polish-language surname; it may refer to:

- Bobby Olejnik (born 1986), Austrian professional footballer
- Craig Olejnik, Canadian actor
- Małgorzata Olejnik (born 1966), Polish politician
- Marián Olejník (born 1976), Slovak slalom canoeist
- Monika Olejnik (born 1956), Polish journalist
- Olga Oleinik (1925–2001), Soviet mathematician
- Robert Olejnik (pilot) (1911–1988), German pilot

== See also ==
- Olenik, another surname
- Oleynik, another surname
- Oliynyk, another surname
