= Kelly Olynyk =

Canadian basketball player (born 1991)

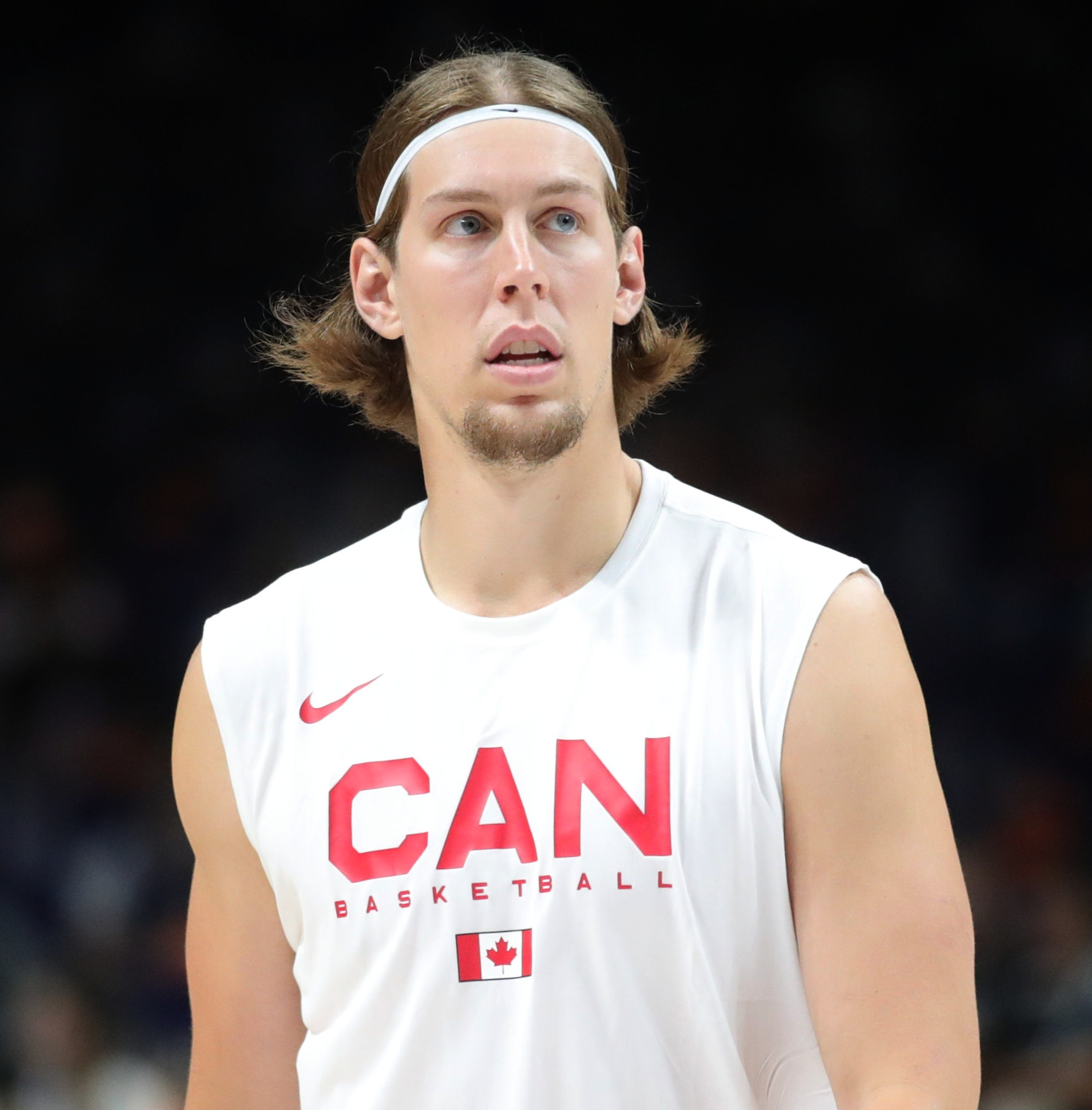
- Olynyk with the Canadian national team in 2023

No. 22 – BC Roma
- Position: Centre / power forward
- League: LBA; EuroCup

Personal information
- Born: April 19, 1991 (age 35) Toronto, Ontario, Canada
- Listed height: 7 ft 0 in (2.13 m)
- Listed weight: 240 lb (109 kg)

Career information
- High school: South Kamloops (Kamloops, British Columbia)
- College: Gonzaga (2009–2013)
- NBA draft: 2013: 1st round, 13th overall pick
- Drafted by: Dallas Mavericks
- Playing career: 2013–present

Career history
- 2013–2017: Boston Celtics
- 2017–2021: Miami Heat
- 2021: Houston Rockets
- 2021–2022: Detroit Pistons
- 2022–2024: Utah Jazz
- 2024–2025: Toronto Raptors
- 2025: New Orleans Pelicans
- 2025–2026: San Antonio Spurs
- 2026–present: BC Roma

Career highlights
- NBA All-Rookie Second Team (2014); Consensus first-team All-American (2013); First-team Academic All-American (2013); WCC Player of the Year (2013); First-team All-WCC (2013); No. 13 retired by Gonzaga Bulldogs
- Stats at NBA.com
- Stats at Basketball Reference
Medals
Men's basketball
Representing Canada
FIBA World Cup
| Bronze medal – third place | 2023 Philippines–Japan–Indonesia |
FIBA AmeriCup
| Bronze medal – third place | 2015 Mexico City |
FIBA Americas U18 Championship
| Bronze medal – third place | 2008 Formosa |

Kelly Tyler Olynyk (/oʊˈlɪnɪk/ oh-LIN-ik; born April 19, 1991) is a Canadian professional basketball player for BC Roma of the Lega Basket Serie A (LBA) and the EuroCup. He played college basketball for the Gonzaga Bulldogs, where he earned All-American honors in 2013.

After forgoing his senior season, Olynyk was selected by the Dallas Mavericks with the 13th overall pick in the 2013 NBA draft before being immediately traded to the Boston Celtics. He spent four seasons with the team, helping them reach the Eastern Conference Finals in 2017. During the 2017 off-season, Olynyk signed with the Miami Heat, with whom he reached the 2020 NBA Finals. He was traded to the Houston Rockets in March 2021.

Olynyk signed with the Detroit Pistons during the 2021 off-season, and was traded to the Utah Jazz during the 2022 off-season. He spent two seasons with the team before being traded to the Toronto Raptors during the 2023–24 season, and then to the New Orleans Pelicans during the 2024–25 season. Olynyk joined the Spurs during the 2025 off-season, with whom he reached the 2026 NBA Finals.

== Early life ==
Olynyk was born on April 19, 1991, in Toronto, Ontario, where he began playing basketball at an early age. Alongside future NBA player Cory Joseph, he played for the Scarborough Blues, a rep basketball team that rarely lost from the late 1990s to the early 2000s. One defeat came against rival Toronto 5-0, a rep team from the city's west end led by Stephen Curry. Olynyk moved with his family to Kamloops, British Columbia, when he was in seventh grade.

== High school career ==
Olynyk did not attend a high school or prep school in the United States; instead, he stayed home at South Kamloops Secondary School. He gained exposure to U.S. competition and coaches by playing on provincial teams, competing in Amateur Athletic Union (AAU) and non-AAU tournaments in the U.S., and representing the Canadian junior national team. Olynyk developed as a point guard, continuing to play that position even after growing from 6'3" (1.90 m) to 6'10" (2.08 m) in grade 11. He was heavily recruited out of high school by programs likes Syracuse, Providence, and North Carolina State. Ultimately, he chose Gonzaga, in part so he could play closer to home.

Olynyk was named Basketball BC's Outstanding High School Player of the Year in his senior season, leading his South Kamloops Titans to a 36–2 record and a third-place finish at the BC AAA High School Boys' Basketball Championships.

Olynyk also played quarterback for the Titans and broke his arm during a playoff game in 2007.

== College career ==
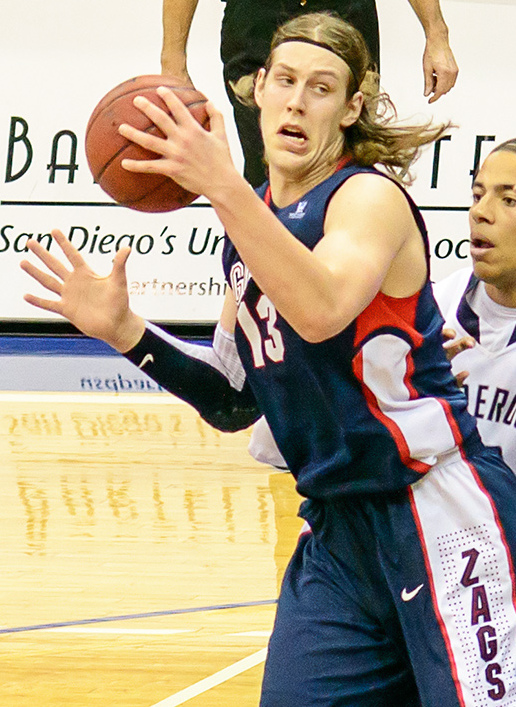
Olynyk at Gonzaga

Olynyk played college basketball at Gonzaga from 2009 to 2013. He was mostly a bench player for the Bulldogs in his freshman and sophomore years, averaging around 12 to 13 minutes per game. In order to improve his game and get stronger, Gonzaga and Olynyk agreed that he would redshirt his junior year (2011–12), meaning he would practice with the team, but not play.

Olynyk returned to the Bulldogs lineup for the first game of the 2012–13 season, and had a great season, being selected as a Consensus First-Team All-American, as well as to the 2012–13 Academic All-America first team. Following the 2012–13 season he opted for the NBA draft, thereby forgoing his senior year of eligibility (though by that time he had already received his bachelor's degree in accounting).

== Professional career ==
=== Boston Celtics (2013–2017) ===
In a draft-night swap, Olynyk was selected by the Dallas Mavericks with the 13th overall pick in the 2013 NBA draft and then traded to the Boston Celtics for the rights to Lucas Nogueira and two future second round picks. On July 7, 2013, Olynyk signed his rookie scale contract with the Celtics. Olynyk was selected alongside teammate Jared Sullinger on Team Webber for the 2014 Rising Stars Challenge. After averaging 8.7 points and 5.2 rebounds in 70 games in 2013–14, he was named to the NBA All-Rookie second team.

On October 29, 2014, the Celtics exercised their third-year team option on Olynyk's rookie scale contract, extending the contract through the 2015–16 season. On December 15, 2014, he scored a career-high 30 points in a 105–87 win over the Philadelphia 76ers. On January 22, 2015, he injured his ankle after landing on the foot of Thomas Robinson in the fourth quarter of the Celtics' 90–89 win over the Portland Trail Blazers. After being projected to return soon after the All-Star break, Olynyk didn't show signs of being ready to return, and subsequently missed 18 games. He returned to action on March 4 against the Utah Jazz. In game 4 of the first round of the 2015 NBA playoffs, against the Cleveland Cavaliers, while grappling, he injured Kevin Love's shoulder. Love did not play the rest of the 2015 playoffs.

Olynyk missed the Celtics' 2015–16 season opener against the Philadelphia 76ers on October 28 after being suspended for his role in Kevin Love's left shoulder injury during the 2015 playoffs. Two days later, the Celtics exercised their fourth-year team option on Olynyk's rookie scale contract, extending the contract through the 2016–17 season. On December 11, 2015, he scored a season-high 28 points in a 124–119 double overtime loss to the Golden State Warriors. On March 16, 2016, he returned to action for the Celtics after missing the previous 12 games with an injured right shoulder.

Olynyk missed the first six games of the 2016–17 season after undergoing right shoulder surgery in May 2016, and subsequently spent a day with the Maine Red Claws of the NBA Development League in early November. He made his season debut for the Celtics on November 9, 2016, playing 25 minutes and scoring two points in a 118–93 loss to the Washington Wizards. On January 13, 2017, he set a new season high with 26 points in a 103–101 win over the Atlanta Hawks. In Game 7 of Boston's second-round playoff series against the Washington Wizards on May 15, he scored 14 of his playoff career-high 26 points in the first 8:34 minutes of the fourth quarter, making five consecutive shots, to help the Celtics advance to the Eastern Conference Finals for the first time since 2012 with a 115–105 win and a 4–3 series victory.

On July 4, 2017, after he became a restricted free agent, the Celtics renounced their rights to Olynyk, thus resulting in him becoming an unrestricted free agent.

=== Miami Heat (2017–2021) ===
On July 7, 2017, Olynyk signed a four-year, $50 million contract with the Miami Heat. In his debut for the Heat in their season opener on October 18, 2017, Olynyk scored 10 points in a 116–109 loss to the Orlando Magic. On December 20, 2017, he scored a career-high 32 points in a 90–89 win over his former team, the Boston Celtics. On March 19, 2018, he scored 30 points off the bench in a 149–141 double-overtime win over the Denver Nuggets, becoming the second bench player in Heat history to score 30 points. Two days later, he recorded 22 points and a career-high 10 assists in a 119–98 win over the New York Knicks.

On February 10, 2020, Olynyk recorded a double-double, which was 12 points and a new career-high 11 assists, along with six rebounds, one steal and one block in a 113–101 win against the Golden State Warriors. Olynyk helped the Heat reach the 2020 NBA Finals, where they lost to the Los Angeles Lakers in six games.

=== Houston Rockets (2021) ===
On March 25, 2021, Olynyk, Avery Bradley, and a 2022 draft pick swap were traded to the Houston Rockets in exchange for Victor Oladipo. Olynyk made his debut in a win over the Minnesota Timberwolves on March 27, recording 16 points, four rebounds, and four assists in 25 minutes. On April 27, he logged a season-high 28 points, alongside nine rebounds, five assists and two steals, in a 107–114 loss to the Timberwolves.

=== Detroit Pistons (2021–2022) ===
On August 6, 2021, Olynyk signed a 3-year, $37 million contract with the Detroit Pistons. On November 10, in a 112–104 win over the Houston Rockets, he suffered a knee injury. Two days later, the injury was diagnosed as a grade 2 medial collateral ligament (MCL) sprain, ruling Olynyk out of action for at least six weeks.

=== Utah Jazz (2022–2024) ===
On September 26, 2022, Olynyk was traded, alongside Saben Lee, to the Utah Jazz in exchange for Bojan Bogdanović. On October 23, Olynyk put up 20 points, including the game-winning layup, in a 122–121 win over the New Orleans Pelicans.

=== Toronto Raptors (2024–2025) ===
On February 8, 2024, Olynyk was traded to his hometown team the Toronto Raptors alongside Ochai Agbaji in exchange for Kira Lewis Jr., Otto Porter Jr., and a 2024 first-round draft pick and on March 4, he signed a two-year, $26.25 million extension with the Raptors.

=== New Orleans Pelicans (2025) ===
On February 6, 2025, the Raptors traded Olynyk, Bruce Brown and multiple draft picks to the New Orleans Pelicans in exchange for Brandon Ingram. In 20 starts for the Pelicans, he averaged 10.7 points, 5.9 rebounds, and 3.6 assists. On April 28, the Pelicans announced that Olynyk had undergone surgery on his left heel and an ultrasound-guided tendon debridement.

=== San Antonio Spurs (2025–2026) ===
On July 6, 2025, Olynyk was traded to the Washington Wizards as part of a three-team trade that also included the Houston Rockets. On July 9, Olynyk was traded to the San Antonio Spurs in exchange for Malaki Branham, Blake Wesley, and a 2026 second-round draft pick.

=== BC Roma (2026–present) ===
On October 4, 2026, Olynyk signed with BC Roma of the Lega Basket Serie A (LBA).

== National team career ==
On July 17, 2019, Olynyk was included on the Canadian national team's training camp roster, but withdrew from the team after being injured in an exhibition game with Nigeria on August 7.

On May 24, 2022, Olynyk agreed to a three-year commitment to play with the Canadian senior men's national team. He was named captain of Canada's team for the 2024 Summer Olympics in Paris.

== Career statistics ==
Legend
| GP | Games played | GS | Games started | MPG | Minutes per game |
| FG% | Field goal percentage | 3P% | 3-point field goal percentage | FT% | Free throw percentage |
| RPG | Rebounds per game | APG | Assists per game | SPG | Steals per game |
| BPG | Blocks per game | PPG | Points per game | **Bold** | Career high |

=== NBA ===
==== Regular season ====
| Year | Team | GP | GS | MPG | FG% | 3P% | FT% | RPG | APG | SPG | BPG | PPG |
|---|---|---|---|---|---|---|---|---|---|---|---|---|
| 2013–14 | Boston | 70 | 9 | 20.0 | .466 | .351 | .811 | 5.2 | 1.6 | .5 | .4 | 8.7 |
| 2014–15 | Boston | 64 | 13 | 22.2 | .475 | .349 | .684 | 4.7 | 1.7 | 1.0 | **.6** | 10.3 |
| 2015–16 | Boston | 69 | 8 | 20.2 | .455 | .405 | .750 | 4.1 | 1.5 | .8 | .5 | 10.0 |
| 2016–17 | Boston | 75 | 6 | 20.5 | .512 | .354 | .732 | 4.8 | 2.0 | .6 | .4 | 9.0 |
| 2017–18 | Miami | 76 | 22 | 23.4 | .497 | .379 | .770 | 5.7 | 2.7 | .8 | .5 | 11.5 |
| 2018–19 | Miami | **79** | 36 | 22.9 | .463 | .354 | .822 | 4.7 | 1.8 | .7 | .5 | 10.0 |
| 2019–20 | Miami | 67 | 9 | 19.4 | .462 | .406 | **.860** | 4.6 | 1.7 | .7 | .3 | 8.2 |
| 2020–21 | Miami | 43 | 38 | 26.9 | .431 | .317 | .775 | 6.1 | 2.1 | .9 | **.6** | 10.0 |
| 2020–21 | Houston | 27 | 24 | **31.1** | .545 | .392 | .835 | **8.4** | 4.1 | **1.4** | **.6** | **19.0** |
| 2021–22 | Detroit | 40 | 1 | 19.1 | .448 | .336 | .775 | 4.4 | 2.8 | .8 | .5 | 9.1 |
| 2022–23 | Utah | 68 | **68** | 28.6 | .499 | .394 | .853 | 6.2 | 3.7 | .9 | .5 | 12.5 |
| 2023–24 | Utah | 50 | 8 | 20.4 | **.562** | .429 | .842 | 5.1 | 4.4 | .7 | .2 | 8.1 |
| 2023–24 | Toronto | 28 | 19 | 26.4 | .548 | .338 | .824 | 5.6 | **4.6** | 1.3 | **.6** | 12.7 |
| 2024–25 | Toronto | 24 | 2 | 16.0 | .500 | **.442** | .791 | 3.7 | 2.3 | .7 | .3 | 7.1 |
| 2024–25 | New Orleans | 20 | 20 | 25.4 | .500 | .389 | .754 | 5.9 | 3.6 | .9 | .6 | 10.7 |
| 2025–26 | San Antonio | 42 | 0 | 8.6 | .490 | .255 | .711 | 1.8 | 1.2 | .4 | .1 | 3.2 |
| Career | | 842 | 283 | 21.8 | .486 | .369 | .794 | 5.0 | 2.4 | .8 | .4 | 9.8 |

==== Playoffs ====
| Year | Team | GP | GS | MPG | FG% | 3P% | FT% | RPG | APG | SPG | BPG | PPG |
|---|---|---|---|---|---|---|---|---|---|---|---|---|
| 2015 | Boston | 4 | 0 | 13.3 | **.538** | .500 | .500 | 1.3 | .5 | .5 | .5 | 4.5 |
| 2016 | Boston | 4 | 0 | 8.0 | .111 | .000 | – | 1.0 | .8 | .3 | .0 | .5 |
| 2017 | Boston | **18** | **2** | 19.2 | .512 | .319 | .733 | 3.2 | 1.9 | .7 | .8 | 9.2 |
| 2018 | Miami | 5 | 0 | **29.2** | .477 | .421 | .700 | **4.6** | **3.8** | **1.4** | **1.2** | **12.8** |
| 2020 | Miami | 17 | 0 | 15.2 | .474 | .347 | **.821** | **4.6** | 1.1 | .2 | .5 | 7.6 |
| 2026 | San Antonio | 9 | 0 | 3.9 | .533 | **.625** | .571 | .8 | .3 | .4 | .0 | 2.8 |
| Career | | 57 | 2 | 15.3 | .485 | .364 | .736 | 3.1 | 1.4 | .5 | .5 | 7.1 |

=== College ===
| Year | Team | GP | GS | MPG | FG% | 3P% | FT% | RPG | APG | SPG | BPG | PPG |
|---|---|---|---|---|---|---|---|---|---|---|---|---|
| 2009–10 | Gonzaga | 34 | 0 | 12.3 | .500 | .222 | .596 | 2.7 | 0.8 | 0.5 | 0.1 | 3.8 |
| 2010–11 | Gonzaga | 35 | 4 | 13.5 | .574 | **.444** | .618 | 3.8 | 0.7 | 0.3 | 0.1 | 5.8 |
| 2011–12 | Gonzaga | Redshirt | | | | | | | | | | |
| 2012–13 | Gonzaga | 32 | **27** | **26.4** | **.629** | .300 | **.776** | **7.3** | **1.7** | **0.7** | **1.1** | **17.8** |
| Career | | 101 | 31 | 17.2 | .594 | .333 | .709 | 4.6 | 1.1 | 0.5 | 0.5 | 8.9 |

== Off the court ==
=== Television ===
Olynyk had a brief cameo appearance as a basketball player who hit a buzzer-beater in the Netflix show Running Point.

== Personal life ==
Olynyk is of Ukrainian descent.

Olynyk's mother, Arlene Olynyk, played college basketball for the Lethbridge Pronghorns and was a Canadian Interuniversity Sport (CIS; now U Sports) women's basketball referee. From 1995 to 2004, she worked for the Toronto Raptors as the NBA’s first female scorekeeper and was the scorekeeper for the Toronto Raptors' first-ever regular season game on November 3, 1995, against the New Jersey Nets. His father, Ken Olynyk, was the head coach of the Lethbridge Pronghorns men's basketball team from 1979 to 1988 and the Toronto Varsity Blues men's basketball team from 1989 to 2002, as well as the Canada junior men's national basketball team from 1983 to 1996, notably cutting future Canadian basketball icon Steve Nash from the team. In 2003, Ken became the athletic director at Thompson Rivers University in Kamloops, British Columbia, with the rest of the family soon joining him in Kamloops. Olynyk has two sisters, Jesse and Maya; Jesse has represented Canada in both wrestling and rugby, while Maya has played CIS basketball for the Saskatchewan Huskies.

== See also ==
- List of Canadians in the National Basketball Association
