= Olenik =

Olenik is a surname. Notable people with the surname include:

- Aleksandar Olenik (born 1973), Serbian politician and lawyer
- Linda Pastan, nee Linda Olenik (1932–2023), American poet
- Valentin Olenik (1939–1987), Russian wrestler

== See also ==
- Olejnik, another surname
- Oleynik, another surname
- Oliynyk, another surname
