= Aleinikov =

Aleinikov (masculine, Russian: Алейников) or Aleinikova (feminine, Russian: Алейникова) is a Russian surname. It is also transliterated as Aleynikov/Aleynikova. Notable people with the surname include:

- Sergei Aleinikov, Belarusian footballer
- Sergey Aleynikov, computer programmer
- Vasili Aleynikov (born 1995), Russian footballer
- Yevgeni Aleinikov (1967–2024), Russian sport-shooter

== See also ==
- Oleynikov
