= Andriy Oliynyk =

Andriy Oliynyk may refer to:

- Andriy Oliynyk (footballer, born 1983), Ukrainian footballer
- Andrii Oliinyk (born 1986), Ukrainian footballer

== See also ==
- Oliynyk
