= Oleynikovo =

Oleynikovo Олейниково
- Settlement
- Location within Astrakhan Oblast Location within Russia
- Coordinates: 45°40′N 46°56′E
- Country: Russia
- Region: Astrakhan Oblast
- District: Limansky District
- Time zone: UTC+4:00

Oleynikovo (Russian: Олейниково) is a rural locality (a settlement) in Promyslovsky Selsoviet, Limansky District, Astrakhan Oblast, Russia. The population was 26 as of 2010. There is 1 street.

== Geography ==
Oleynikovo is located 28 km southwest of Liman (the district's administrative centre) by road. Yandyki is the nearest rural locality.
