= Todd Oliynyk =

Australian mathematician

Todd Oliynyk is a professor in mathematics at Monash University in Melbourne, Australia. He works in the area of mathematical relativity and partial differential equations. In 2011, he was awarded the Australian Mathematical Society Medal. He received a Fulbright Senior Scholarship in 2017.
