= Tyler Zeller =

American basketball player (born 1990)

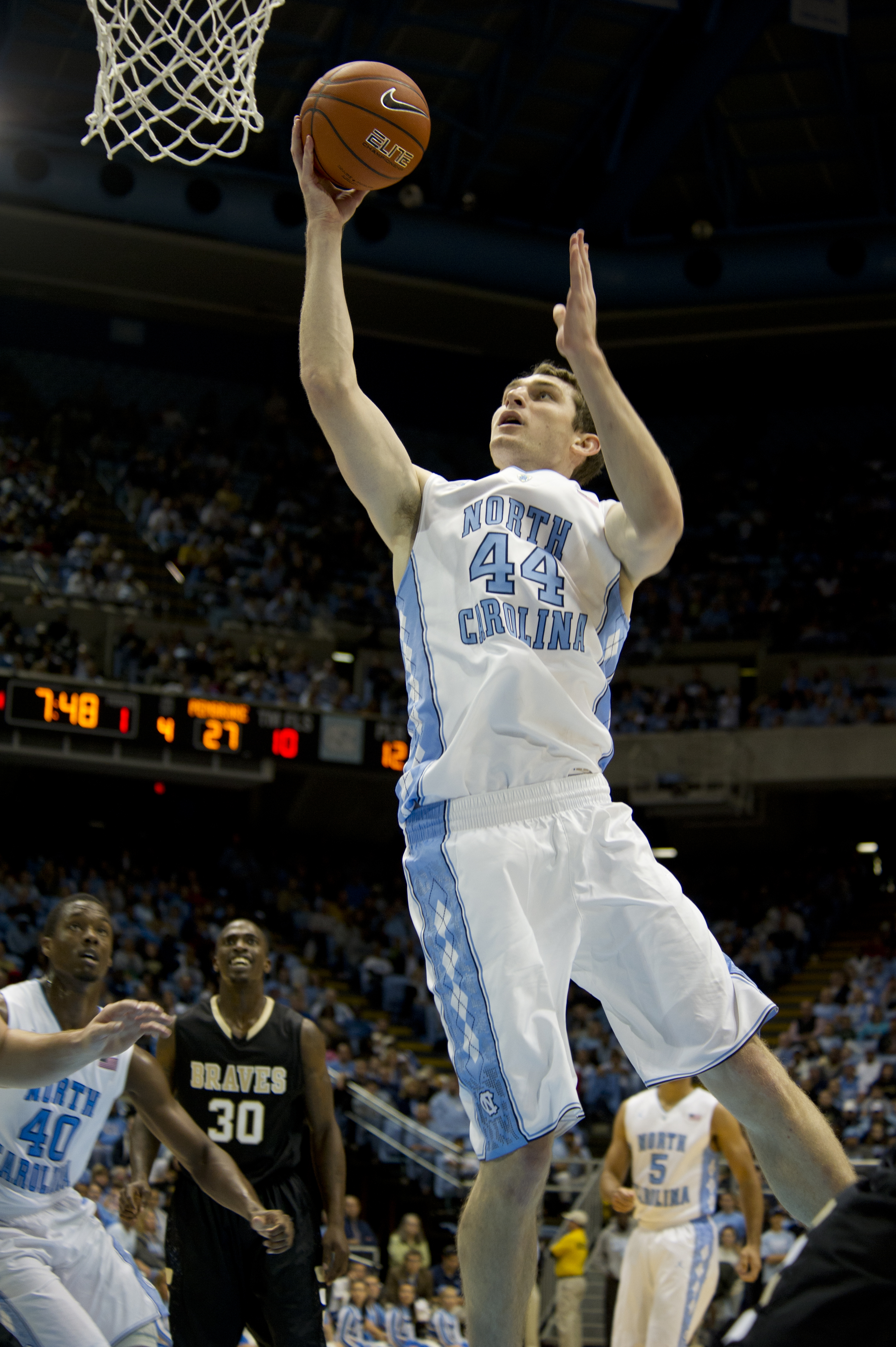
- Zeller with North Carolina in 2011

Personal information
- Born: January 17, 1990 (age 36) Visalia, California, U.S.
- Listed height: 6 ft 11 in (2.11 m)
- Listed weight: 250 lb (113 kg)

Career information
- High school: Washington (Washington, Indiana)
- College: North Carolina (2008–2012)
- NBA draft: 2012: 1st round, 17th overall pick
- Drafted by: Dallas Mavericks
- Playing career: 2012–2020
- Position: Center
- Number: 40, 44, 45

Career history
- 2012–2014: Cleveland Cavaliers
- 2014–2017: Boston Celtics
- 2017–2018: Brooklyn Nets
- 2018: Milwaukee Bucks
- 2019: Atlanta Hawks
- 2019: Memphis Grizzlies
- 2020: San Antonio Spurs

Career highlights
- NBA All-Rookie Second Team (2013); NCAA champion (2009); Consensus second-team All-American (2012); Academic All-American of the Year (2012); ACC Player of the Year (2012); First-team All-ACC (2012); Second-team All-ACC (2011); No. 44 honored by North Carolina Tar Heels; McDonald's All-American (2008); First-team Parade All-American (2008); Indiana Mr. Basketball (2008)

Career NBA statistics
- Points: 2,873 (6.9 ppg)
- Rebounds: 1,820 (4.4 rpg)
- Assists: 367 (0.9 apg)
- Stats at NBA.com
- Stats at Basketball Reference

Tyler Paul Zeller (born January 17, 1990) is an American former professional basketball player. He played college basketball for the North Carolina Tar Heels. As a freshman, he played on their 2009 national championship team and as a senior was an All-American and the Atlantic Coast Conference Player of the Year. He is the nephew of former NBA player Al Eberhard, and the brother of fellow NBA players Cody Zeller and Luke Zeller.

== Early life ==
Born in Visalia, California, Tyler Zeller grew up in Washington, Indiana, attending Washington High School. In his four years at Washington High, his team won four sectional titles, as well as state Class 3A championships in his freshman and senior years (2005 and 2008). In his senior year, he averaged 33.1 points and 11.0 rebounds per game, and also shot 69% from the field and 82% from the free throw line. In his final high school game, the '08 Class 3A final against Fort Wayne Harding, he scored 47 points, which broke a record for scoring by a player in an Indiana boys' state championship game that had stood since 1970. He was not only a basketball superstar, but also played on Washington High's tennis team for three years, and finished his high school career with a 3.99 grade point average on a 4.0 scale, good for third in his graduating class. After the 2008 season, he was named "Mr. Basketball" in Indiana, the state's highest honor for high school players. He received the title three years after his brother Luke and three years before his brother Cody were honored with the same award. He was also named a McDonald's All-American, as well as a first-team Parade All-American.

During the early stages of the signing period in November 2007, Zeller signed a letter of intent to play at the University of North Carolina at Chapel Hill. When the university announced his signing, Tar Heels head coach Roy Williams said about Zeller, "I think he is the finest running big man in the country and he has a tremendous shooting touch to go with that ability to run the floor." Zeller notably exhibited that shooting touch at the 2018 Kentucky Derby Festival Classic, where he won the event's three-point shooting contest.

Considered a four-star recruit by Rivals.com, Zeller was listed as the No. 7 center and the No. 33 player in the nation in 2008.

== College career ==
Zeller started the first two games of the 2008–09 season in place of the previous season's consensus national Player of the Year, Tyler Hansbrough, who was sidelined with a stress reaction in his right shin. In his first game, he scored 18 points in Carolina's season-opening win over Penn.

The Tar Heels' next game, on November 18, was against another equally storied team, Kentucky. The Heels scored a surprisingly easy 77–58 win over the Wildcats, but suffered another injury blow, this time involving Zeller. With 1:26 left in the game, Zeller went for a breakaway dunk off a turnover, but was fouled by Kentucky's Ramon Harris before he could score. Zeller fell to the floor awkwardly, got up, and was taken to the locker room holding his left wrist.

X-rays showed that Zeller had broken both of the major bones in his lower left arm (the radius and ulna). The day after the injury, he had surgery at UNC Hospitals to repair the broken bones. In early January 2009, Zeller's cast was removed.

Zeller made his return during his freshman season on February 18, 2009, in the Tar Heels' home game against North Carolina State, playing 8 minutes and scoring 2 points.

As a sophomore, Zeller averaged 9.3 points per game on 52.1% shooting and 4.6 rebounds per game in limited action off the bench.

Zeller averaged 15.7 points per game during his junior year. He shot 54.7% and averaged 7.2 rebounds per game. He had a more active role, playing an average of 28.1 minutes per game, significantly more than the 17.4 minutes per game during his sophomore campaign.

Zeller averaged 16.5 points per game on 55.3% shooting during his senior season. He also played an average of 28.2 minutes per game.

Zeller was voted to the All-ACC First Team his senior year and was named the ACC Player of the Year. Zeller was also named a second team all American by the Sporting News and the USBWA as a senior. Both accolades made him eligible to have his jersey honored in the rafters of the Smith Center at the conclusion of his college career.

== Professional career ==
=== Cleveland Cavaliers (2012–2014) ===
Zeller announced that he was entering the 2012 NBA draft along with North Carolina teammates Harrison Barnes, Kendall Marshall and John Henson. He was selected by the Dallas Mavericks with the 17th pick in the draft, and was the fourth Tar Heel to be selected in the first round. He was subsequently traded to the Cleveland Cavaliers on draft night, and signed his rookie scale contract with the Cavaliers on July 5, 2012.

On October 11, 2013, Zeller underwent an emergency appendectomy procedure to remove his appendix and was subsequently ruled out indefinitely. He recovered from the surgery in time to face the Brooklyn Nets in the team's 2013–14 season opener on October 30.

On March 22, 2014, Zeller scored a then career-high 23 points in a 118–111 loss to the Houston Rockets.

=== Boston Celtics (2014–2017) ===
On July 10, 2014, Zeller was traded to the Boston Celtics in a three-team trade that also involved the Cavaliers and the Brooklyn Nets. On December 5, 2014, he scored a then career-high 24 points on 10-of-11 shooting in a 113–96 win over the Los Angeles Lakers. He set a new career high on March 16, 2015, against the Philadelphia 76ers, scoring 26 points on 11-of-15 shooting to help the Celtics defeat the 76ers, 108–89.

Zeller started the 2015–16 season as the Celtics' starting center, but moved to the bench after just three games. Over the Celtics' first 25 games of the season, Zeller logged nine DNPs. On December 16, he scored a season-high 12 points in a loss to the Detroit Pistons, hitting 5-of-7 from the field in less than ten minutes. Zeller began to see increased minutes in early February, recording two 16-point games on February 2 against the New York Knicks, and on February 5 against the Cleveland Cavaliers, both wins. On February 7, he again set a season high, scoring 17 points in a 128–119 win over the Sacramento Kings. On April 8, he tied a career high with 26 points in a 124–109 win over the Milwaukee Bucks.

On June 29, 2016, the Celtics tendered a qualifying offer to make Zeller a restricted free agent. He went on to re-sign with the Celtics on July 27, 2016. On July 2, 2017, he was waived by the Celtics.

=== Brooklyn Nets (2017–2018) ===
On September 12, 2017, Zeller signed a multi-year contract with the Brooklyn Nets.

=== Milwaukee Bucks (2018) ===
On February 5, 2018, Zeller was traded to the Milwaukee Bucks in exchange for Rashad Vaughn and the rights to a future second-round draft pick. On October 13, 2018, he was waived by the Bucks.

=== Atlanta Hawks (2019) ===
On March 7, 2019, Zeller signed a 10-day contract with the Atlanta Hawks. He was not retained by the Hawks upon the expiration of the 10-day contract.

=== Memphis Grizzlies (2019) ===
On April 5, 2019, Zeller signed with the Memphis Grizzlies for the remainder of the season.

=== San Antonio Spurs (2020) ===
On September 28, 2019, the Denver Nuggets had announced that Zeller had joined for training camp. On October 18, 2019, the Nuggets waived Zeller.

On June 24, 2020, the San Antonio Spurs signed Zeller to their roster to complete the 2019–20 season following the restart of league play coming out of the COVID-19 pandemic. On December 2, Zeller was included in training camp roster with the Spurs, but was later waived by the San Antonio Spurs on December 19.

== Post-playing career ==
After his NBA career, Zeller and his family moved to Pittsboro, North Carolina, and he soon began serving as an assistant high school basketball coach at Northwood High School. He also participates in UNC alumni games.

In 2024 Zeller joined the Tar Heel Sports Network, serving as a color analysts for Tar Heels basketball games.

== Personal life ==
Zeller is the son of Steve and Lorri Zeller, the nephew of former NBA player Al Eberhard, and is the middle brother of former NBA players Luke and Cody.

Zeller is married and has 3 children.

== Career statistics ==
Legend
GP	Games played	GS	Games started	MPG	Minutes per game
FG%	Field goal percentage	3P%	3-point field goal percentage	FT%	Free throw percentage
RPG	Rebounds per game	APG	Assists per game	SPG	Steals per game
BPG	Blocks per game	PPG	Points per game	**Bold**	Career high

=== NBA ===
==== Regular season ====
Year	Team	GP	GS	MPG	FG%	3P%	FT%	RPG	APG	SPG	BPG	PPG
2012–13	Cleveland	77	55	**26.4**	.438	.000	.764	**5.7**	1.2	**.5**	**.9**	7.9
2013–14	Cleveland	70	9	15.0	.538	.000	.719	4.0	.5	.3	.5	5.7
2014–15	Boston	**82**	**59**	21.1	.549	–	.823	**5.7**	**1.4**	.2	.6	10.2
2015–16	Boston	60	3	11.8	.476	–	.815	3.0	.5	.2	.4	6.1
2016–17	Boston	51	5	10.3	.494	.000	.564	2.4	.8	.1	.4	3.5
2017–18	Brooklyn	42	33	16.7	.546	**.385**	.667	4.6	.7	.2	.5	7.1
2017–18	Milwaukee	24	1	16.9	**.590**	.000	**.895**	4.6	.8	.3	.6	5.9
2018–19	Atlanta	2	0	5.5	.000	.000	–	3.0	.5	.0	.0	0.0
2018–19	Memphis	4	1	20.5	.571	–	.778	4.5	.8	.3	.8	**11.5**
2019–20	San Antonio	2	0	2.0	.250	–	–	2.0	.0	.0	.0	1.0
Career		414	166	17.5	.508	.286	.764	4.4	.9	.3	.6	6.9

==== Playoffs ====
Year	Team	GP	GS	MPG	FG%	3P%	FT%	RPG	APG	SPG	BPG	PPG
2015	Boston	4	**4**	**22.5**	.517	–	**.800**	4.5	.5	.5	.3	**8.5**
2016	Boston	3	0	12.7	.467	–	.667	**5.0**	**.7**	.0	**.7**	6.0
2017	Boston	**11**	0	7.1	.520	–	.750	1.7	**.7**	.0	.2	2.9
2018	Milwaukee	7	3	9.4	**.800**	–	.750	2.0	.4	**.6**	.4	1.6
Career		25	7	10.9	.527	–	.739	2.6	.6	.2	.3	3.8

=== College ===
Year	Team	GP	GS	MPG	FG%	3P%	FT%	RPG	APG	SPG	BPG	PPG
2008–09	North Carolina	15	2	7.8	.472	–	.765	2.0	.2	.2	.2	3.1
2009–10	North Carolina	27	0	17.3	.521	.0	.722	4.6	.3	.5	.9	9.3
2010–11	North Carolina	37	35	28.1	.549	–	.759	7.2	.6	.7	1.2	15.8
2011–12	North Carolina	**38**	**38**	**28.2**	**.553**	–	**.808**	**9.6**	**.9**	**.9**	**1.5**	**16.3**
Career		117	75	23.0	.543	.0	.775	6.7	.6	.7	1.1	12.8

Awards and achievements
Preceded by Eric Gordon	Indiana Mr. Basketball award 2008	Succeeded by Jordan Hulls
