= Olejníkov =

- Municipality
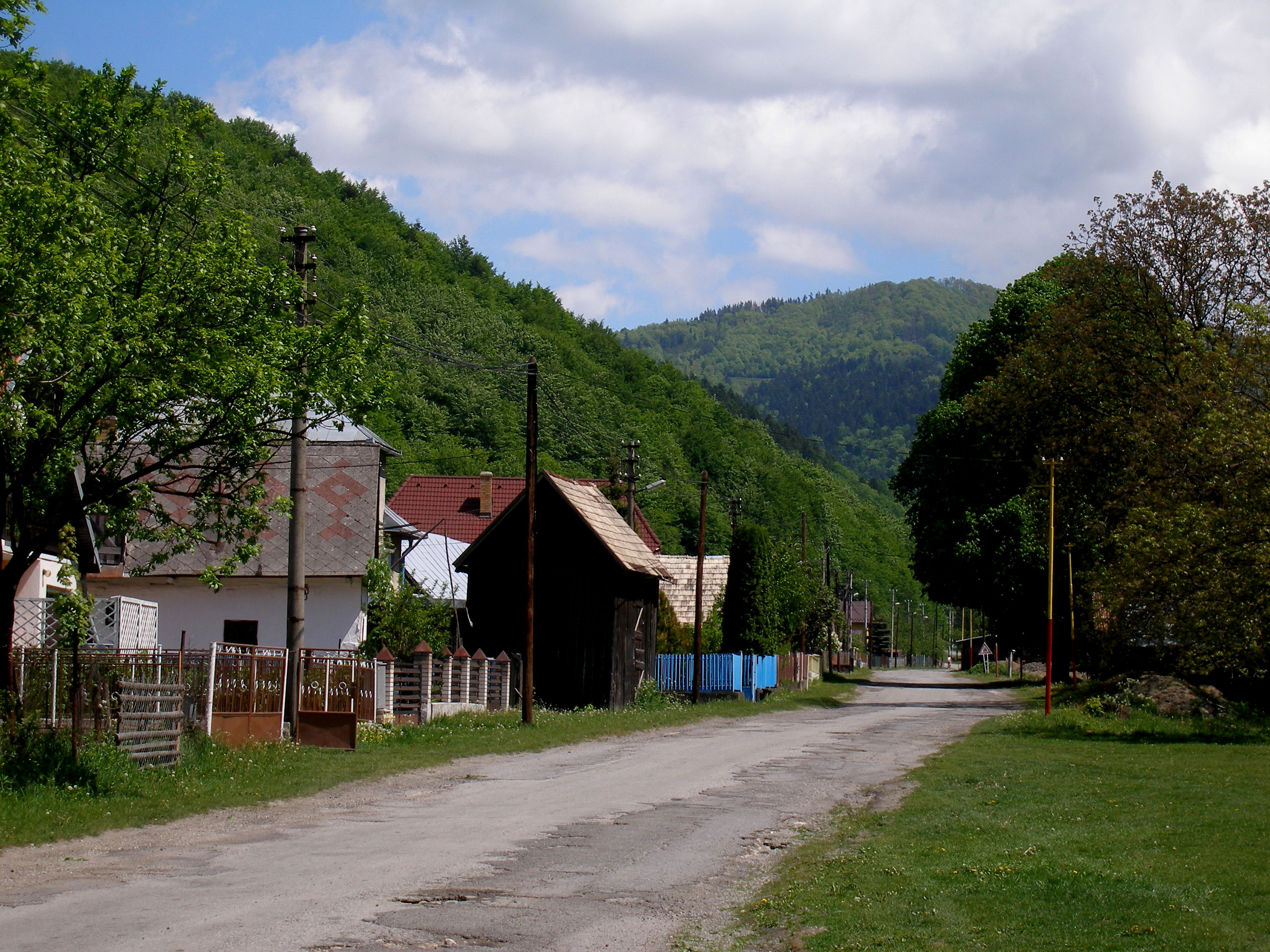

- Flag

- Location of Olejníkov in the Prešov Region Location of Olejníkov in Slovakia
- Coordinates: 49.18°N 21.07°E
- Country: Slovakia
- Region: Prešov Region
- District: Sabinov District
- First mentioned: 1454

Area
  - Total: 44.46 km^{2} (17.17 sq mi)
- Elevation: 683 m (2,241 ft)

Population (2025)
  - Total: 692
- Time zone: UTC+1 (CET)
  - Summer (DST): UTC+2 (CEST)
- Postal code: 825 7
- Area code: +421 51
- Vehicle registration plate (until 2022): SB
- Website: www.olejnikov.sk

Olejníkov is a village and municipality in Sabinov District in the Prešov Region of north-eastern Slovakia.

== History ==
In historical records the village was first mentioned in 1454.

== Geography ==
The municipality lies at an altitude of 683 metres (2,241 ft) and covers an area of 44.46 km^{2} (17.17 sq mi) (2025).

== Population ==
Population statistic (10 years)
Year	1995	2005	2015	2025
Count	278	361	464	692
Difference		+29.85%	+28.53%	+49.13%

Population statistic
Year	2024	2025
Count	675	692
Difference		+2.51%

It has a population of 692 people (31 December 2025).

=== Ethnicity ===
Census 2021 (1+ %)
Ethnicity	Number	Fraction
Slovak	550	96.66%
Romani	296	52.02%
Not found out	22	3.86%
Total	569	

In year 2021 was 569 people by ethnicity 550 as Slovak, 296 as Romani, 22 as Not found out, 2 as Rusyn and 1 as Czech.

Note on population: The difference values of population numbers in the table "Population statistic" and in the sections "Ethnicity" & "Religion" is caused by the use of various statistical methods.

=== Religion ===
Census 2021 (1+ %)
Religion	Number	Fraction
Greek Catholic Church	471	82.78%
Roman Catholic Church	60	10.54%
None	18	3.16%
Not found out	17	2.99%
Total	569	

In year 2021 was 569 people by religion 471 from Greek Catholic Church, 60 from Roman Catholic Church, 18 from None, 17 from Not found out, 2 from Other and 1 from Paganism and natural spirituality.
