= Olynyk =

Olynyk is a surname. Notable people with the surname include:

- Brent Olynyk (born 1971), Canadian badminton player
- Kelly Olynyk (born 1991), Canadian basketball player
- Patricia Olynyk, Canadian-born American multimedia artist, scholar, and educator
