= Jared Sullinger =

American basketball player (born 1992)

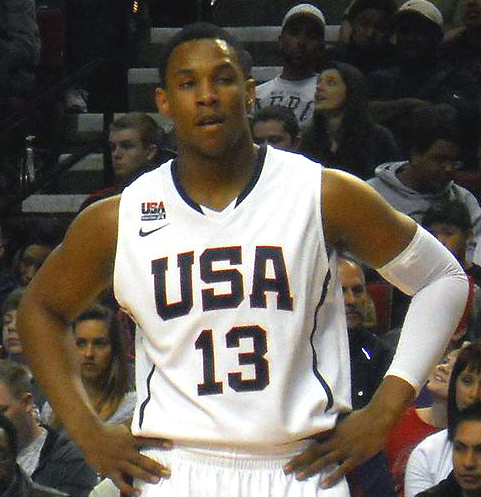
- Sullinger at the 2010 Nike Hoop Summit

Ohio State Buckeyes
- Title: Director of player development
- League: Big Ten Conference

Personal information
- Born: March 4, 1992 (age 34) Columbus, Ohio, U.S.
- Listed height: 6 ft 9 in (2.06 m)
- Listed weight: 260 lb (118 kg)

Career information
- High school: Northland (Columbus, Ohio)
- College: Ohio State (2010–2012)
- NBA draft: 2012: 1st round, 21st overall pick
- Drafted by: Boston Celtics
- Playing career: 2012–2026
- Position: Power forward
- Number: 0, 7, 13

Career history

Playing
- 2012–2016: Boston Celtics
- 2016–2017: Toronto Raptors
- 2017: →Raptors 905
- 2017–2018: Shenzhen Leopards
- 2021: Anyang KGC
- 2021–2024: Shenzhen Leopards
- 2024: Cangrejeros de Santurce
- 2024–2025: Beijing Royal Fighters
- 2025–2026: Guangdong Southern Tigers

Coaching
- 2026–present: Ohio State

Career highlights
- CBA International MVP (2024); 2× CBA rebounding leader (2018, 2023); KBL Playoffs MVP (2021); 2× Consensus first-team All-American (2011, 2012); USBWA National Freshman of the Year (2011); Big Ten Freshman of the Year (2011); 2× First-team All-Big Ten (2011, 2012); Big Ten All-Freshman Team (2011); Big Ten tournament MOP (2011); Naismith Prep Player of the Year (2010); McDonald's All-American Game Co-MVP (2010); First-team Parade All-American (2010); Second-team Parade All-American (2009); 2× Ohio Mr. Basketball (2009, 2010)

Career statistics
- Points: 2,893 (10.8 ppg)
- Rebounds: 2,006 (7.5 rpg)
- Assists: 477 (1.8 apg)
- Stats at NBA.com
- Stats at Basketball Reference

Jared Malcolm Xavier Sullinger (born March 4, 1992) is an American former professional basketball player, and current director of player development for the Ohio State Buckeyes. He played college basketball for Ohio State before being selected 21st overall by the Boston Celtics in the 2012 NBA draft.

== High school career ==
Sullinger was rated as the #2 player in the class of 2010 in the ESPNU 100, the #4 player by Scout.com, and the #5 player by Rivals.com. In his senior year, Sullinger led Northland High School to a 21–0 season and a #1 national ranking. He averaged 24.5 points and 11.7 rebounds for the season. Sullinger played in the 4th annual Boost Mobile Elite 24 Hoops Classic.

Sullinger was selected to play in the 2010 McDonald's All-American Game in Columbus, Ohio, where he was named co-MVP with Harrison Barnes. He was also selected to play in the 2010 Nike Hoop Summit at the Rose Garden in Portland, Oregon and the 2010 Jordan Brand Classic at Madison Square Garden in New York.

On March 10, 2010, Sullinger won the James A. Naismith Award, which goes to the boys' high school basketball player of the year.

=== College recruitment ===
College recruiting
Name	Hometown	School	Height	Weight	Commit date
Jared Sullinger; PF	Columbus, OH	Northland HS	6 ft 9 in (2.06 m)	286 lb (130 kg)	May 10, 2007
Jared Sullinger; PF	Recruit ratings: Scout: Rivals: (98)				
Overall recruit ranking: Scout: 10, 2 (C) Rivals: 5, 1 (C) ESPN: 2, 1 (PF)
Note: In many cases, Scout, Rivals, 247Sports, On3, and ESPN may conflict in their listings of height and weight.; In these cases, the average was taken. ESPN grades are on a 100-point scale.; Sources:

Sullinger committed to Ohio State on May 10, 2007.

== College career ==
=== Freshman ===
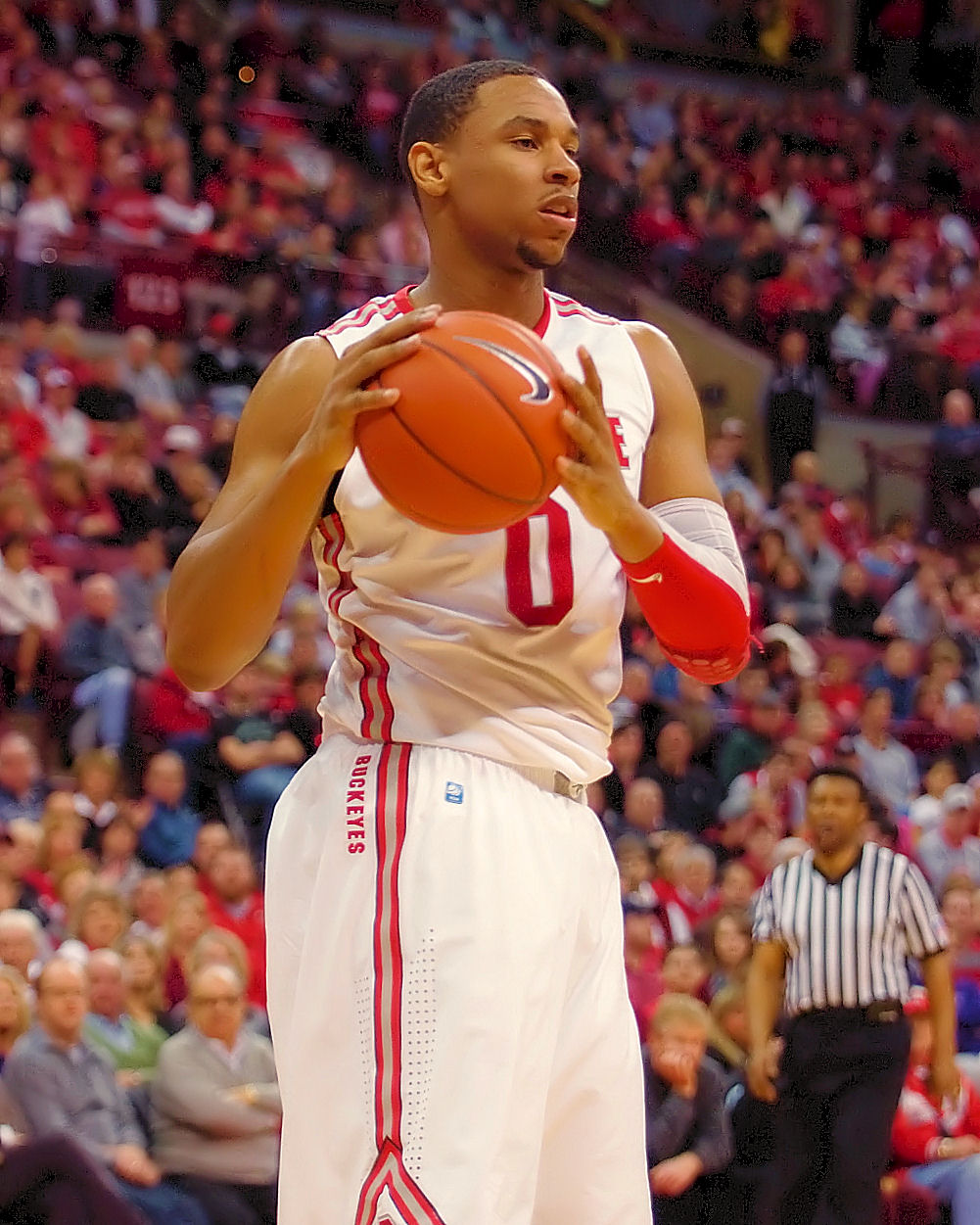
Sullinger at Ohio State

Sullinger had 19 points and 14 rebounds in his Ohio State debut. Sullinger's brother, J.J. Sullinger, also attended Ohio State and played for coach Thad Matta. For the 2010–11 season Jared Sullinger averaged 17.2 points, 10.2 rebounds and 1.2 assists in 31.7 minutes per game for the Buckeyes. Leading the Buckeyes to a 2011 Big Ten men's basketball tournament championship, being named MOP. Ohio State finished the regular season at 32–2 and was selected as the 2011 NCAA tournament's number one overall seed. The Buckeyes made it to the "Sweet Sixteen" where they lost to Kentucky 62–60. Sullinger was named a First Team All-American by Fox Sports.

=== Sophomore ===
In what would be his final year at Ohio State, Sullinger led the Buckeyes to a 31–8 overall record (13–5 Big Ten). He averaged 17.5 points and 9.3 rebounds per game during the 2011–12 season. The Buckeyes advanced to the 'Final Four' of the 2012 NCAA tournament, where the team lost to the Kansas Jayhawks. Sullinger had 13 points in the game and was 5-of-19 shooting with 11 rebounds in the loss. Five days after the loss, the two-time AP All-American declared he was entering the 2012 draft, where he was widely expected to be a lottery pick, until he was reportedly flagged by several teams after the Chicago pre-draft camp due to back issues.

== Professional career ==
=== Boston Celtics (2012–2016) ===
==== 2012–13 season ====
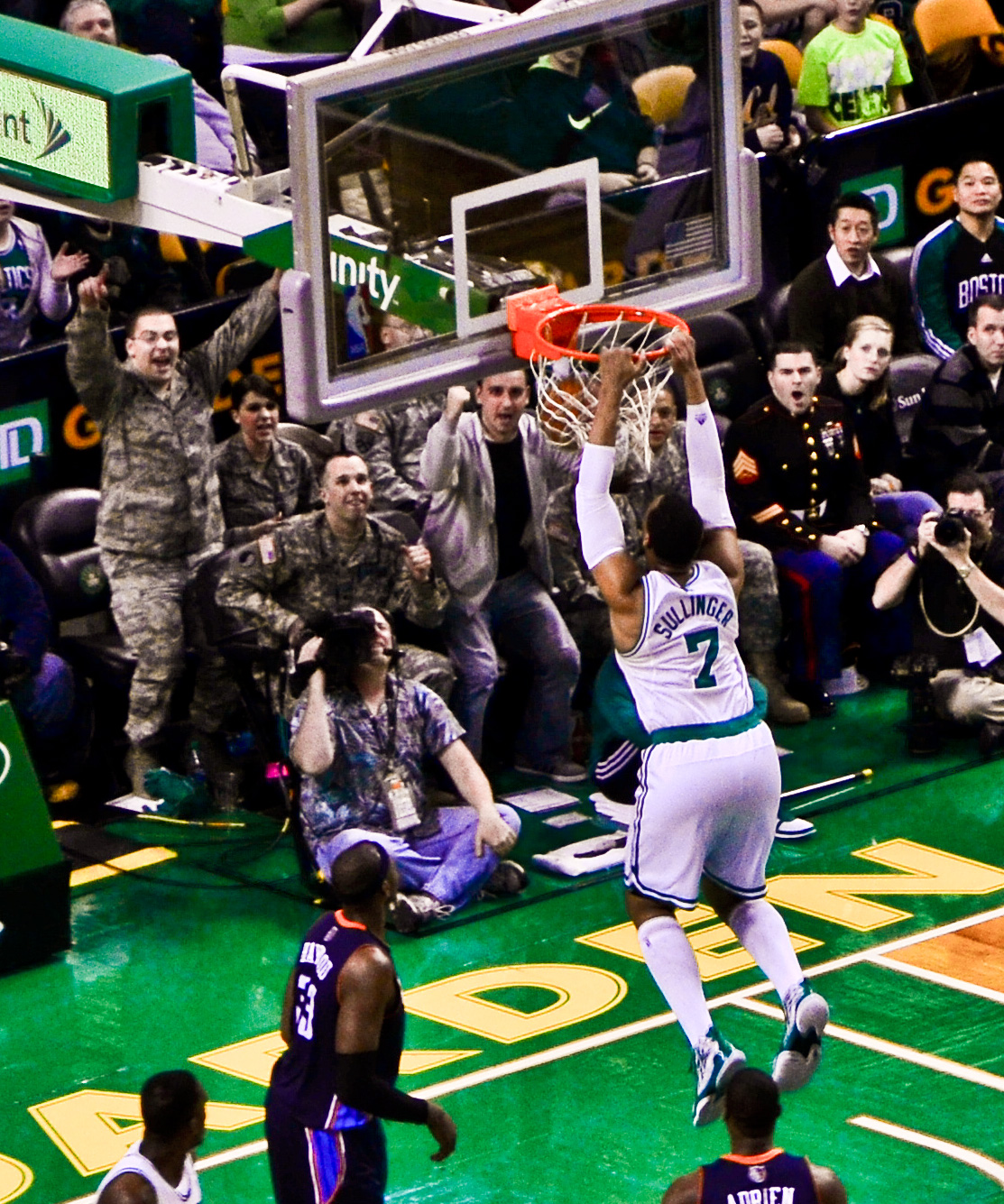
Sullinger going up for a dunk with Boston

On June 29, 2012, Sullinger was selected with the 21st overall pick in the 2012 NBA draft by the Boston Celtics. On July 3, he signed his rookie scale contract with the Celtics. On November 17, he recorded his first double-double with 12 points and 11 rebounds in a 107–89 win over the Toronto Raptors. The following night, he scored a season-high 16 points in a loss to the Detroit Pistons. He tied that mark on December 25, recording 16 points and 7 rebounds in a 93–76 win over the Brooklyn Nets.

On February 1, 2013, Sullinger underwent successful lumbar disk surgery and was subsequently ruled out for the rest of the season.

==== 2013–14 season ====
On January 15, 2014, in a win over the Toronto Raptors, Sullinger recorded 25 points and a career-high 20 rebounds. Sullinger's 20-20 was the first by a Celtics player since Kevin Garnett did so in 2007. On February 7, he scored a career-high 31 points in a 99–89 win over the Sacramento Kings.

==== 2014–15 season ====
After averaging 14.4 points and 8.1 rebounds per game up until the 2015 NBA All-Star Weekend, Sullinger was ruled out indefinitely after X-rays on February 19 revealed a stress reaction in his left foot. Three days later, he was ruled out for the rest of the season after further medical evaluation determined that Sullinger had sustained a left metatarsal stress fracture. However, in a surprising move, Sullinger returned to action on April 3 against the Milwaukee Bucks. He entered the game four minutes into the third quarter, missed both his shots and didn't return as part of a gradual effort to improve his stamina.

==== 2015–16 season ====
Sullinger began the 2015–16 season coming off the bench for the first three games. He started his first game of the season on November 4 against the Indiana Pacers, replacing Tyler Zeller as the starting center. On December 7, 2015, Sullinger scored 11 points and tied a career high with 20 rebounds in a 111–93 win over the New Orleans Pelicans. On February 7, 2016, he tied his season high with 21 points in a 128–119 win over the Sacramento Kings.

On June 29, 2016, the Celtics tendered a qualifying offer to make Sullinger a restricted free agent. The Celtics later withdrew their qualifying offer on July 8, making him an unrestricted free agent.

=== Toronto Raptors (2016–2017) ===
On July 14, 2016, Sullinger signed a one-year, $6 million contract with the Toronto Raptors. On October 24, 2016, he had a screw inserted into the fifth metatarsal in his left foot. As a result, he missed the first half of the 2016–17 season. After missing half the season, Sullinger made his debut for the Raptors on January 18, 2017, scoring eight points in just under 14 minutes off the bench in a 94–89 loss to the Philadelphia 76ers. On January 28, 2017, he was assigned to Toronto's D-League affiliate, Raptors 905, on a rehab assignment. He was recalled by Toronto the next day. Three days later, he had a season-best game with 13 points and six rebounds in a 109–104 loss to the Boston Celtics. He was reassigned to Raptors 905 on February 10, and was recalled on February 12.

On February 23, 2017, Sullinger was traded, along with cash considerations and Toronto's second-round draft picks in 2017 and 2018, to the Phoenix Suns in exchange for P. J. Tucker. However, he was waived by the Suns the following day.

=== Shenzhen Leopards (2017–2018) ===
On September 12, 2017, Sullinger signed a one-year deal with the Shenzhen Leopards of the Chinese Basketball Association. He re-signed with the team on August 6, 2018. On January 16, 2018, Sullinger became one of the few players in the CBA to record 40 points and 30 rebounds in a single game as he posted 40 points and 31 rebounds in a 129–103 victory over the Shandong Golden Stars.

=== Anyang KGC (2021) ===
In February 2021, Sullinger joined Anyang KGC of the Korean league and helped the team capture the league championship. He averaged 27.1 points, 12.3 rebounds, 3.2 assists, and 1.4 steals per game.

=== Return to the Leopards (2021–2024) ===
On December 26, 2021, Sullinger returned to the Shenzhen Leopards of the Chinese Basketball Association (CBA). In April 2024, Sullinger was named CBA International Most Valuable Player for that season after averaging 21.8 points, 11.3 rebounds, and 4 assists per game.

=== Beijing Royal Fighters (2024-2025) ===
In December 2024, Sullinger made his debut with the Beijing Royal Fighters of the Chinese Basketball Association.

=== Guangdong Southern Tigers (2025-2026) ===
On November 16, 2025, Jared signed with Guangdong Southern Tigers of the Chinese Basketball Association (CBA).

=== Retirement ===
On September 3, 2026, Sullinger announced his retirement from professional basketball to take up the position of Director of Player Development as part of the Ohio State Buckeyes men's basketball team under head coach Jake Diebler.

== Career statistics ==
=== NBA ===
Legend
GP	Games played	GS	Games started	MPG	Minutes per game
FG%	Field goal percentage	3P%	3-point field goal percentage	FT%	Free throw percentage
RPG	Rebounds per game	APG	Assists per game	SPG	Steals per game
BPG	Blocks per game	PPG	Points per game	**Bold**	Career high

==== Regular season ====
Year	Team	GP	GS	MPG	FG%	3P%	FT%	RPG	APG	SPG	BPG	PPG
2012–13	Boston	45	5	19.8	**.493**	.200	.746	5.9	.8	.5	.5	6.0
2013–14	Boston	74	44	**27.6**	.427	.269	**.778**	8.1	1.6	.5	**.7**	**13.3**
2014–15	Boston	58	49	27.0	.439	**.283**	.744	7.6	**2.3**	.8	**.7**	**13.3**
2015–16	Boston	**81**	**73**	23.6	.435	.282	.640	**8.3**	**2.3**	**.9**	.6	10.3
2016–17	Toronto	11	1	10.7	.319	.167	.500	2.5	.3	.4	.1	3.4
Career		269	172	24.3	.436	.272	.723	7.5	1.8	.7	.6	10.8

==== Playoffs ====
Year	Team	GP	GS	MPG	FG%	3P%	FT%	RPG	APG	SPG	BPG	PPG
2015	Boston	4	0	**20.0**	**.553**	.333	.571	**7.0**	.3	.0	**.8**	**12.3**
2016	Boston	**6**	**2**	13.5	.310	**.500**	**.750**	4.5	**1.2**	**.2**	.0	5.2
Career		10	2	16.1	.425	.385	.636	5.5	.8	.1	.3	8.0

=== College ===
Year	Team	GP	GS	MPG	FG%	3P%	FT%	RPG	APG	SPG	BPG	PPG
2010–11	Ohio State	37	37	31.7	.541	.250	.704	10.2	1.2	1.0	.5	17.2
2011–12	Ohio State	37	36	30.4	.519	.400	.768	9.2	1.2	1.2	1.1	17.5
Career		74	73	31.0	.530	.365	.733	9.7	1.2	1.1	0.8	17.3

== Awards and honors ==
NBA

- BBVA Rising Stars Challenge Contestant (2014)
- Eastern Conference Player of the Week Award Winner (February 3–9, 2014)

College

- 2011 Big Ten Tournament Most Valuable Player
- 2011 Big Ten Freshman Of the Year
- 2011 Wayman Tisdale Freshman of the Year Award

High school

- 2010 James A. Naismith Award winner
- 2010 McDonald's All-American Game co-MVP
- 2010 McDonald's All-American team selection
- 2010 Jordan Brand High School All-American team selection
- 2010 First-team Parade All-American

== Personal life ==
On September 3, 2013, Sullinger turned himself in to police after an alleged domestic assault on his girlfriend. He was charged with assault and battery, intimidation of a witness, and destruction of property. He pleaded not guilty to the charges, which were later dropped.
