= Borys Oliynyk (engineer) =

Ukrainian politician (1934–1999)

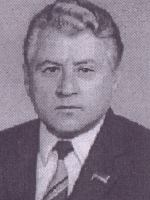
- Born: Borys Stepanovych Oleynik; 23 June 1934; Bozhykivtsi, Derazhnia Raion, Vinnytsia Oblast, Ukraine, Soviet Union
- Died: 1 October 1999 (aged 65); Kyiv, Ukraine
- Cause of death: murder
- Education: Dnipropetrovsk National University of Rail Transport
- Years active: 1957-1999
- Children: 2

Borys Stepanovych Oliynyk (Ukrainian: Борис Степанович Олійник; 23 June 1934 – 1 October 1999) was a Ukrainian political figure and merited rail transport worker. He was a member of first convocation of the Verkhovna Rada.

== Biography ==
Oliynyk was born in a village in historical region of Podillya on territory of the modern Khmelnytskyi Oblast, which at that time was part of Vinnytsia Oblast.

Borys Oliynyk started his professional career soon after graduating from the Dnipropetrovsk National University of Rail Transport as a railway engineer in 1957.

In 1957 he worked as a yardmaster at a train station in Mohyliv-Podilskyi and next year as a director of various other train station of the Zhmerynka department of Southwestern Railway. In 1965-1976 Oliynyk headed a number of regional departments of Southwestern Railway in Hraivoron and Konotop. Since 1976 he served as a top official of Southwestern Railway.

While being a director of the Southwestern Railway, in 1991 he was appointed to the newly established the State Administration of Rail Transport of Ukraine (today known as Ukrzaliznytsia) just before the dissolution of the Soviet Union. During its reorganization Oliynyk refused to continue be in charge of Ukrzaliznytsia and was replaced in August 1993. He continued to be the chief officer of the Southwestern Railway.

In 1957–1991 Oliynyk was a member of the Communist Party of Ukraine, and since 1981 he was a candidate member of the Central Committee of the party. In 1981-1994 he also was a People's Deputy of Ukraine in Verkhovna Rada and attempted to run for parliament in 1998.

On 1 October 1999 Oliynyk was shot two steps away from his own apartment along with his driver Volodymyr Nechai. (Note: "On October 1st 1999 the boss of that company, Borys Oliynyk, died outside his Kyiv apartment building in an apparent mob hit.") It was one of the biggest politically motivated unsolved murders of 1999. Shortly after the murder, Ukrainian law enforcement called it a "matter of honor" to solve the crime.

The People's Deputy of Ukraine Anatoliy Yermak announced that the murder was connected with money laundering of Russian funds in the Bank of New York.

== Gallery ==
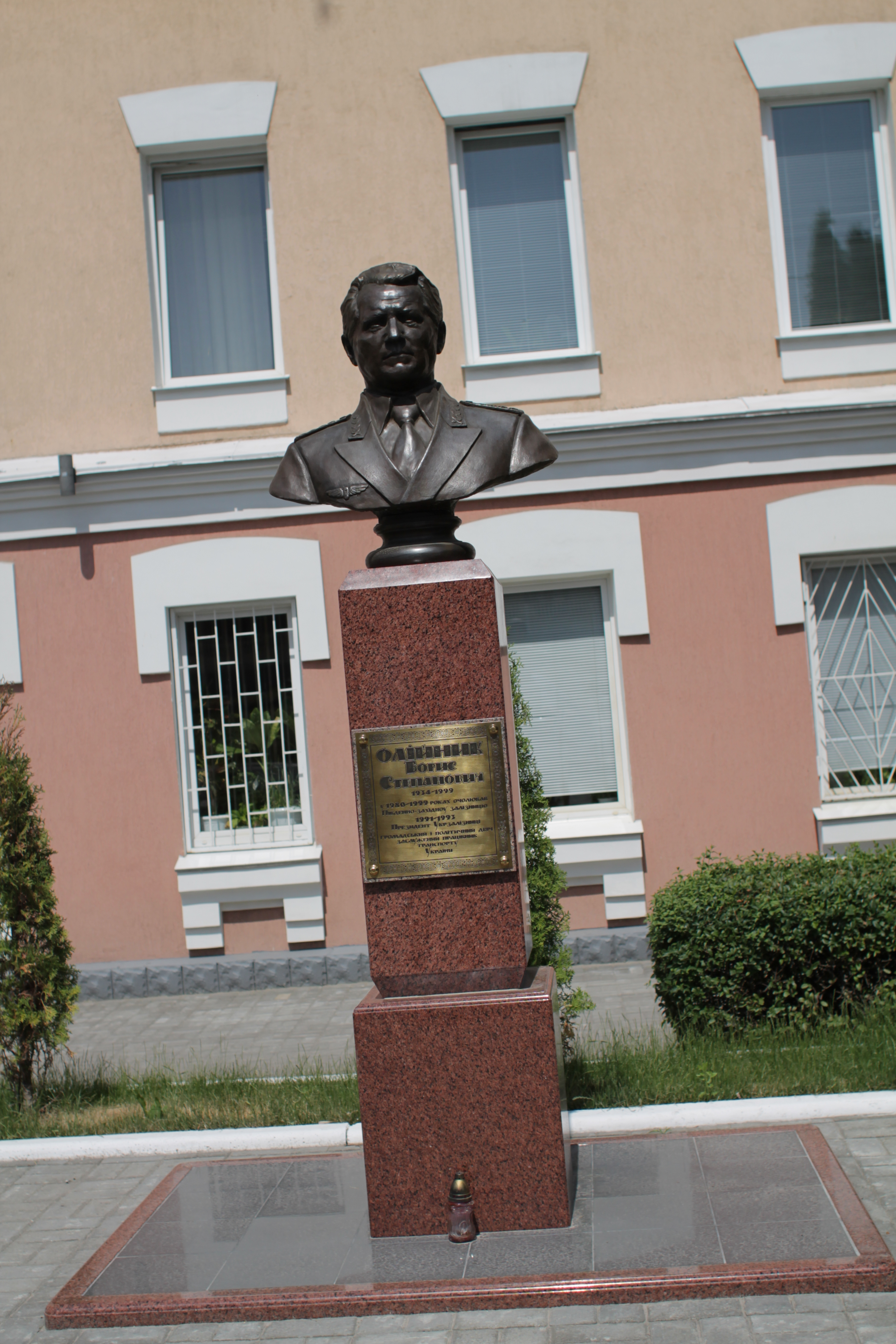
Bust of Borys Oliynyk at a train station in Zhmerynka

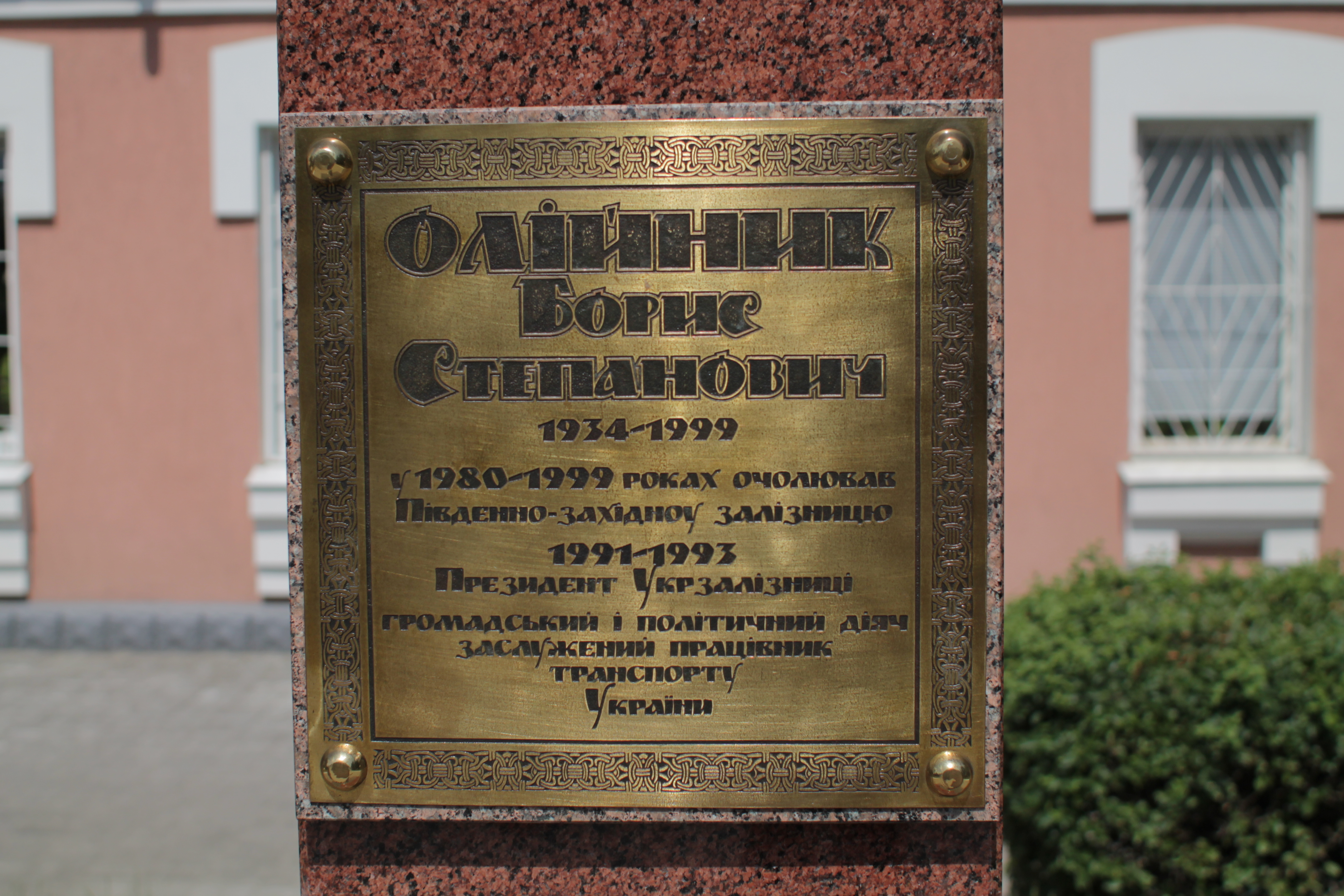
Plackard on the same bust

== See also ==
- Vadym Hetman
- Georgiy Gongadze
- Pavel Sheremet
- Vyacheslav Chornovil
