= List of 2010–11 NBA season transactions =

This is a list of all personnel changes for the 2010 NBA off-season and 2010–11 NBA season.

== Retirement ==
Date	Name	Team(s) played (years)	Age	Notes	Ref.
June 7	Kevin Ollie	Dallas Mavericks (1997); Orlando Magic (1998, 1999); Sacramento Kings (1999); Philadelphia 76ers (1999–2000, 2000–2001, 2004–2008); New Jersey Nets (2000); Chicago Bulls (2001–2002); Indiana Pacers (2002); Milwaukee Bucks (2002–2003); Seattle SuperSonics/Oklahoma City Thunder (2003, 2009–2010); Cleveland Cavaliers (2003–2004); Minnesota Timberwolves (2008–2009)	37	Hired as the Connecticut Huskies assistant coach	
August 10	Rasheed Wallace	Washington Bullets (1995–1996); Portland Trail Blazers (1996–2004); Atlanta Hawks (2004); Detroit Pistons (2004–2009); Boston Celtics (2009–2010)	34	Came out of retirement in 2012.	
August 17	Adonal Foyle	Golden State Warriors (1997–2007); Orlando Magic (2007–2009, 2009–2010); Memphis Grizzlies (2009)	35	Did not play any games in the 2009–10 season due to a knee injury	
November 4	Fabricio Oberto	San Antonio Spurs (2005–2009); Washington Wizards (2009–2010); Portland Trail Blazers (2010)	35	Retired due to recurrent palpitations related to a prior cardiac condition. Made a comeback in 2013.	
December 27	Steve Francis	Houston Rockets (1999–2004, 2007–2008); Orlando Magic (2004–2006); New York Knicks (2006–2007)	33		
May 11	Robert Traylor	Milwaukee Bucks (1998–2000); Cleveland Cavaliers (2000–2001, 2004–2005); Charlotte / New Orleans Hornets (2001–2003)	34	Was reported dead from a heart attack.	

== Front office movements ==
=== Head coach changes ===
Off-season

Date	Team	Outgoing head coach	Reason for departure	Incoming head coach	Last coaching position	Ref.
May 21	Philadelphia 76ers	Eddie Jordan	Fired	Doug Collins	Washington Wizards head coach (2001–2003)	
June 7	New Orleans Hornets	Jeff Bower	Resigned	Monty Williams	Portland Trail Blazers assistant coach (2005–2010)	
June 10	New Jersey Nets	Kiki Vandeweghe	Contract expired	Avery Johnson	Dallas Mavericks head coach (2005–2007)	
June 13	Atlanta Hawks	Mike Woodson	Contract expired	Larry Drew	Atlanta Hawks assistant coach (2004–2010)	
June 23	Chicago Bulls	Vinny Del Negro	Fired	Tom Thibodeau	Boston Celtics assistant coach (2007–2010)	
July 1	Cleveland Cavaliers	Mike Brown	Fired	Byron Scott	New Orleans Hornets head coach (2004–2009)	
July 7	Los Angeles Clippers	Kim Hughes	Fired	Vinny Del Negro	Chicago Bulls head coach (2008–2010)	
September 27	Golden State Warriors	Don Nelson	Resigned	Keith Smart	Golden State Warriors assistant coach (2003–2010)	

In-season

Date	Team	Outgoing head coach	Reason for departure	Incoming head coach	Last coaching position	Ref.
December 22	Charlotte Bobcats	Larry Brown	Departed after a 9–19 start	Paul Silas	Cleveland Cavaliers head coach (2003–2005)	
January 30	Indiana Pacers	Jim O'Brien	Fired	Frank Vogel (interim)	Indiana Pacers assistant coach (2007–2011)	
February 10	Utah Jazz	Jerry Sloan	Resigned	Tyrone Corbin	Utah Jazz assistant coach (2004–2011)	

=== General manager changes ===
Off-season

Date	Team	Outgoing general manager	Reason for departure	Incoming general manager	Last managerial position	Ref.
June 4	Cleveland Cavaliers	Danny Ferry	Resigned	Chris Grant	Cleveland Cavaliers assistant general manager (2005–2010)	
July 15	New Jersey Nets	Rod Thorn	Stepped down	Billy King	Philadelphia 76ers general manager (1998–2007)	
July 19	Portland Trail Blazers	Kevin Pritchard	Fired	Rich Cho	Oklahoma City Thunder assistant general manager (2000–2010)	
July 21	New Orleans Hornets	Jeff Bower	Resigned	Dell Demps	San Antonio Spurs director of pro player personnel (2005–2010)	
August 5	Phoenix Suns	Steve Kerr	Contract expired	Lance Blanks	Cleveland Cavaliers assistant general manager (2005–2010)	
August 27	Denver Nuggets	Mark Warkentien	Contract expired	Masai Ujiri	Toronto Raptors assistant general manager (2007–2010)	

== Player movement ==
The following is a list of player movement via free agency and trades.

=== Trades ===
June
June 17	To Sacramento Kings: Samuel Dalembert	To Philadelphia 76ers: Andrés Nocioni; Spencer Hawes
June 21	To Portland Trail Blazers: The 34th pick in 2010 draft ( Armon Johnson)	To Golden State Warriors: The 44th pick in 2010 draft; Cash considerations
June 22	To Milwaukee Bucks: Corey Maggette; The 44th pick in 2010 draft	To Golden State Warriors: Charlie Bell; Dan Gadzuric
June 23	To Oklahoma City Thunder: Daequan Cook; The 18th pick in 2010 draft	To Miami Heat: The 32nd pick in 2010 draft
June 24	To Portland Trail Blazers: Ryan Gomes; Draft rights to 16th pick Luke Babbitt	To Minnesota Timberwolves: Martell Webster
June 24	To Los Angeles Clippers: Draft rights to 18th pick Eric Bledsoe	To Oklahoma City Thunder: Future conditional first-round pick
June 24	To Washington Wizards: Draft rights to 23rd pick Trevor Booker; Draft rights to 56th pick Hamady N'Diaye	To Minnesota Timberwolves: Draft rights to 30th pick Lazar Hayward; Draft rights to 35th pick Nemanja Bjelica
June 24	To New Jersey Nets: Draft rights to 24th pick Damion James	To Atlanta Hawks: Draft rights to 27th pick Jordan Crawford; Draft rights to 31st pick Tibor Pleiß
June 24	To Dallas Mavericks: Draft rights to 25th pick Dominique Jones	To Memphis Grizzlies: Cash considerations
June 24	To Oklahoma City: Draft rights to 31st pick Tibor Pleiß	To Atlanta Hawks: Cash considerations
June 24	To Oklahoma City Thunder: Draft rights to 48th pick Latavious Williams	To Miami Heat: Future second-round pick
June 24	To Toronto Raptors: Draft rights to 50th pick Solomon Alabi	To Dallas Mavericks: Future conditional second-round pick; Cash considerations
June 24	To Indiana Pacers: Draft rights to 51st pick Magnum Rolle	To Oklahoma City Thunder: Draft rights to 57th pick Ryan Reid; Cash considerations
June 25	To Milwaukee Bucks: Chris Douglas-Roberts	To New Jersey Nets: 2012 second-round pick
June 29	To New Jersey Nets: Quinton Ross	To Washington Wizards: Yi Jianlian; Cash considerations
July
July 8	To Oklahoma City Thunder: Morris Peterson; Draft rights to 11th pick Cole Aldrich	To New Orleans Hornets: Draft rights to 21st pick Craig Brackins; Draft rights to 26th pick Quincy Pondexter
July 8	To Washington Wizards: Kirk Hinrich; Draft rights to 17th pick Kevin Seraphin; Cash considerations	To Chicago Bulls: Draft rights to Vladimir Veremeenko
July 8	To New York Knicks: Draft rights to 44th pick Jerome Jordan	To Milwaukee Bucks: Cash considerations
July 9	To Utah Jazz: Trade exception	To Chicago Bulls: Carlos Boozer (sign and trade); 2011 second-round pick
July 9	To Phoenix Suns: Hakim Warrick (sign and trade)	To Chicago Bulls: 2011 second-round pick
July 9	To Golden State Warriors: David Lee (sign and trade)	To New York Knicks: Kelenna Azubuike; Anthony Randolph; Ronny Turiaf; 2012 second-round pick
July 9	To New York Knicks: Amar'e Stoudemire (sign and trade)	To Phoenix Suns: Future conditional second-round pick; Trade exception
July 10	To Miami Heat: LeBron James (sign and trade)	To Cleveland Cavaliers: Two future conditional first-round picks; Two future second-round picks; Option to swap 2012 first-round pick; Trade exception
July 10	To Miami Heat: Chris Bosh (sign and trade)	To Toronto Raptors: 2011 first-round pick; Future conditional first-round pick; Trade exception
July 12	To Minnesota Timberwolves: Michael Beasley	To Miami Heat: 2011 second-round pick; 2014 second-round pick; Cash considerations
July 13	To Dallas Mavericks: Tyson Chandler; Alexis Ajinça	To Charlotte Bobcats: Matt Carroll; Erick Dampier; Eduardo Nájera; Cash considerations
July 13	To Phoenix Suns: Josh Childress (sign and trade)	To Atlanta Hawks: 2012 second-round pick; Trade exception
July 13	To New Jersey Nets: Anthony Morrow (sign and trade)	To Golden State Warriors: 2011 conditional second-round pick; Trade exception
July 13	To Utah Jazz: Al Jefferson	To Minnesota Timberwolves: Kosta Koufos; Two future conditional first-round picks
July 14	To Phoenix Suns: Hedo Türkoğlu	To Toronto Raptors: Leandro Barbosa; Dwayne Jones
July 21	To Milwaukee Bucks: Jon Brockman (sign and trade)	To Sacramento Kings: Darnell Jackson; 2011 second-round pick
July 22	To Chicago Bulls: C. J. Watson (sign and trade)	To Golden State Warriors: 2011 second-round pick; Trade exception
July 26	To Cleveland Cavaliers: Ramon Sessions; Ryan Hollins; 2013 second-round pick	To Minnesota Timberwolves: Delonte West; Sebastian Telfair
July 28	To Toronto Raptors: David Andersen	To Houston Rockets: Cash considerations; 2015 conditional second-round pick
August
August 11	Four-team trade	
August 11	To Indiana Pacers: Darren Collison (from New Orleans); James Posey (from New Orleans)	To New Orleans Hornets: Trevor Ariza (from Houston)
August 11	To Houston Rockets: Courtney Lee (from New Jersey)	To New Jersey Nets: Troy Murphy (from Indiana)
August 11	To Toronto Raptors: Julian Wright	To New Orleans Hornets: Marco Belinelli
September
September 23	To Philadelphia 76ers: Craig Brackins; Darius Songaila	To New Orleans Hornets: Jason Smith; Willie Green
October
October 18	To New Orleans Hornets: Curtis Jerrells	To San Antonio Spurs: Future conditional second-round pick
October 23	To New Orleans Hornets: Jerryd Bayless	To Portland Trail Blazers: 2011 first-round pick
November
November 20	To Toronto Raptors: Jerryd Bayless; Peja Stojaković	To New Orleans Hornets: David Andersen; Marcus Banks; Jarrett Jack
December
December 15	Three-team trade	
December 15	To New Jersey Nets: Sasha Vujačić (from Los Angeles); 2011 conditional first-round pick (from Los Angeles); 2012 conditional first-round pick (from Houston)	To Houston Rockets: Terrence Williams (from New Jersey)
December 15	To Los Angeles Lakers: Joe Smith (from New Jersey); 2011 second-round pick (from New Jersey); 2012 second-round pick (from New Jersey); Draft rights to Sergei Lishouk (from Houston); Trade exception	
December 15	To Sacramento Kings: Jermaine Taylor; Cash considerations	To Houston Rockets: Future conditional second-round pick
December 18	To Phoenix Suns: Vince Carter; Marcin Gortat; Mickaël Piétrus; 2011 first-round pick; Cash considerations	To Orlando Magic: Hedo Türkoğlu; Jason Richardson; Earl Clark
December 18	To Washington Wizards: Rashard Lewis	To Orlando Magic: Gilbert Arenas
January
January 24	To Toronto Raptors: Alexis Ajinça; Future second-round pick; Cash considerations	To Dallas Mavericks: Draft rights to Georgios Printezis
February
February 22	To Toronto Raptors: James Johnson	To Chicago Bulls: Miami's 2011 first-round pick
February 22	Three-team trade	
February 22	To Denver Nuggets: Wilson Chandler (from New York); Danilo Gallinari (from New York); Raymond Felton (from New York); Timofey Mozgov (from New York); 2014 first-round pick (from New York); 2012 second-round pick (from New York); 2013 second-round pick (from New York); Right to exchange 2016 first-round draft picks (from New York); Kosta Koufos (from Minnesota)	To New York Knicks: Carmelo Anthony (from Denver); Chauncey Billups (from Denver); Shelden Williams (from Denver); Renaldo Balkman (from Denver); Anthony Carter (from Denver); Corey Brewer (from Minnesota)
February 22	To Minnesota Timberwolves: Eddy Curry (from New York); Anthony Randolph (from New York); Cash considerations (from New York); 2015 second-round pick (from Denver)	
February 23	To New Jersey Nets: Deron Williams	To Utah Jazz: Devin Harris; Derrick Favors; 2011 first-round pick; 2012 first-round pick
February 23	To New Jersey Nets: Dan Gadzuric; Brandan Wright	To Golden State Warriors: Troy Murphy; 2012 second-round pick
February 23	To Sacramento Kings: Marcus Thornton; Cash considerations	To New Orleans Hornets: Carl Landry
February 23	To Atlanta Hawks: Kirk Hinrich; Hilton Armstrong	To Washington Wizards: Mike Bibby; Maurice Evans; Jordan Crawford; 2011 first-round pick
February 24	To Los Angeles Clippers: Mo Williams; Jamario Moon	To Cleveland Cavaliers: Baron Davis; 2011 first-round pick
February 24	To Boston Celtics: Jeff Green; Nenad Krstić	To Oklahoma City Thunder: Kendrick Perkins; Nate Robinson
February 24	To Cleveland Cavaliers: Semih Erden; Luke Harangody	To Boston Celtics: 2013 second-round pick
February 24	To Memphis Grizzlies: Shane Battier; Ishmael Smith	To Houston Rockets: Hasheem Thabeet; DeMarre Carroll; 2013 first-round pick
February 24	To Charlotte Bobcats: D. J. White; Morris Peterson	To Oklahoma City Thunder: Nazr Mohammed
February 24	To Houston Rockets: Goran Dragić; 2011 conditional first-round pick	To Phoenix Suns: Aaron Brooks
February 24	To Charlotte Bobcats: Dante Cunningham; Joel Przybilla; Sean Marks; 2011 first-round pick; 2013 first-round pick	To Portland Trail Blazers: Gerald Wallace
February 24	To Sacramento Kings: Marquis Daniels; Cash considerations	To Boston Celtics: 2017 second-round pick

=== Signed from free agency ===
Signed in the off-season
Player	Signed	New team	Former team
Channing Frye	July 8	Phoenix Suns	
Chris Duhon	July 8	Orlando Magic	New York Knicks
Rudy Gay	July 8	Memphis Grizzlies	
Steve Blake	July 8	Los Angeles Lakers	Los Angeles Clippers
Randy Foye	July 8	Los Angeles Clippers	Washington Wizards
Ryan Gomes	July 8	Los Angeles Clippers	Portland Trail Blazers
John Salmons	July 8	Milwaukee Bucks	
Joe Johnson	July 8	Atlanta Hawks	
Drew Gooden	July 8	Milwaukee Bucks	Los Angeles Clippers
Ray Allen	July 8	Boston Celtics	
Carlos Boozer	July 8	Chicago Bulls	Utah Jazz (sign and trade)
Hakim Warrick	July 9	Phoenix Suns	Chicago Bulls (sign and trade)
Amir Johnson	July 9	Toronto Raptors	
Amar'e Stoudemire	July 9	New York Knicks	Phoenix Suns (sign and trade)
Tyrus Thomas	July 9	Charlotte Bobcats	
Brendan Haywood	July 9	Dallas Mavericks	
David Lee	July 9	Golden State Warriors	New York Knicks (sign and trade)
Brian Cook	July 9	Los Angeles Clippers	Houston Rockets
Dwyane Wade	July 10	Miami Heat	
Chris Bosh	July 10	Miami Heat	Toronto Raptors (sign and trade)
LeBron James	July 10	Miami Heat	Cleveland Cavaliers (sign and trade)
Udonis Haslem	July 12	Miami Heat	
Tyrus Thomas	July 12	Charlotte Bobcats	
Darko Miličić	July 12	Minnesota Timberwolves	
Raymond Felton	July 12	New York Knicks	Charlotte Bobcats
Dorell Wright	July 12	Golden State Warriors	Miami Heat
Anthony Morrow	July 13	New Jersey Nets	Golden State Warriors (sign and trade)
Kyle Korver	July 13	Chicago Bulls	Utah Jazz
Matt Bonner	July 13	San Antonio Spurs	
Hilton Armstrong	July 13	Washington Wizards	Houston Rockets
Ian Mahinmi	July 13	Dallas Mavericks	San Antonio Spurs
Timofey Mozgov	July 13	New York Knicks	Khimki
Quentin Richardson	July 13	Orlando Magic	Miami Heat
Josh Childress	July 13	Phoenix Suns	Olympiacos (sign and trade with Hawks)
Tony Allen	July 13	Memphis Grizzlies	Boston Celtics
Jermaine O'Neal	July 14	Boston Celtics	Miami Heat
Derek Fisher	July 14	Los Angeles Lakers	
Kyle Lowry	July 14	Houston Rockets (matched offer sheet from Cavaliers)	
Jordan Farmar	July 14	New Jersey Nets	Los Angeles Lakers
Johan Petro	July 14	New Jersey Nets	Denver Nuggets
Travis Outlaw	July 14	New Jersey Nets	Los Angeles Clippers
Paul Pierce	July 15	Boston Celtics	
Mike Miller	July 15	Miami Heat	Washington Wizards
Anthony Carter	July 15	Denver Nuggets	
Shelden Williams	July 15	Denver Nuggets	Boston Celtics
Al Harrington	July 15	Denver Nuggets	New York Knicks
Raja Bell	July 15	Utah Jazz	Golden State Warriors
Joel Anthony	July 15	Miami Heat	
JJ Redick	July 15	Orlando Magic (matched offer sheet from Bulls)	
Luis Scola	July 15	Houston Rockets	
Žydrūnas Ilgauskas	July 16	Miami Heat	Cleveland Cavaliers
Nate Robinson	July 19	Boston Celtics	
Jamaal Magloire	July 19	Miami Heat	
James Jones	July 19	Miami Heat (previously waived by Heat)	
Craig Smith	July 19	Los Angeles Clippers	
Dirk Nowitzki	July 19	Dallas Mavericks	
Ronnie Brewer	July 19	Chicago Bulls	Memphis Grizzlies
Keyon Dooling	July 19	Milwaukee Bucks	New Jersey Nets
Juwan Howard	July 20	Miami Heat	Portland Trail Blazers
Brad Miller	July 20	Houston Rockets	Chicago Bulls
Wesley Matthews	July 21	Portland Trail Blazers	Utah Jazz
Tony Battie	July 21	Philadelphia 76ers	New Jersey Nets
Luke Ridnour	July 21	Minnesota Timberwolves	Milwaukee Bucks
Richard Jefferson	July 21	San Antonio Spurs	
Royal Ivey	July 21	Oklahoma City Thunder	Milwaukee Bucks
Carlos Arroyo	July 22	Miami Heat	
C. J. Watson	July 22	Chicago Bulls	Golden State Warriors (sign and trade)
Gary Neal	July 22	San Antonio Spurs	Benetton Treviso
Theo Ratliff	July 22	Los Angeles Lakers	Charlotte Bobcats
Matt Barnes	July 23	Los Angeles Lakers	Orlando Magic
Antoine Wright	July 23	Sacramento Kings	Toronto Raptors
Eugene Jeter	July 23	Sacramento Kings	Hapoel Jerusalem
Linas Kleiza	July 26	Toronto Raptors	Olympiacos (Nuggets refused to match the offer sheet)
Marquis Daniels	July 26	Boston Celtics	
Josh Powell	July 26	Atlanta Hawks	Los Angeles Lakers
Kurt Thomas	July 26	Chicago Bulls	Milwaukee Bucks
Shavlik Randolph	July 27	Miami Heat	
Rasual Butler	July 28	Los Angeles Clippers	
Kenny Hasbrouck	July 28	Miami Heat	
Jason Collins	July 29	Atlanta Hawks	
Joey Graham	July 30	Cleveland Cavaliers	Denver Nuggets
Josh Howard	July 30	Washington Wizards	
Eddie House	August 3	Miami Heat	New York Knicks
Von Wafer	August 3	Boston Celtics	Olympiacos
Jason Williams	August 3	Orlando Magic	
Shaquille O'Neal	August 4	Boston Celtics	Cleveland Cavaliers
Ben Wallace	August 4	Detroit Pistons	
Anthony Tolliver	August 10	Minnesota Timberwolves	Golden State Warriors
Sean May	August 10	New Jersey Nets (waived on September 7)	Sacramento Kings
Roger Mason	August 10	New York Knicks	San Antonio Spurs
Keith Bogans	August 11	Chicago Bulls	San Antonio Spurs
Shannon Brown	August 11	Los Angeles Lakers	
Tracy McGrady	August 16	Detroit Pistons	New York Knicks
Tim Thomas	August 18	Dallas Mavericks	
Earl Boykins	August 19	Milwaukee Bucks	Washington Wizards
Kwame Brown	August 19	Charlotte Bobcats	Detroit Pistons
Patrick Ewing Jr.	August 27	New York Knicks	Did not play in the 2009–10 season due to injury
Delonte West	September 1	Boston Celtics	Cleveland Cavaliers
Etan Thomas	September 2	Atlanta Hawks	Oklahoma City Thunder
Rodney Carney	September 8	Golden State Warriors (waived on January 4)	Philadelphia 76ers
Mustafa Shakur	September 8	New Orleans Hornets	Oklahoma City Thunder
Joe Smith	September 10	New Jersey Nets	Atlanta Hawks
Louis Amundson	September 13	Golden State Warriors	Phoenix Suns
Francisco Elson	September 15	Utah Jazz	Philadelphia 76ers
Stephen Graham	September 15	New Jersey Nets	Charlotte Bobcats
Malik Allen	September 16	Orlando Magic	Denver Nuggets
Ronald Dupree	September 16	Toronto Raptors (waived on October 19, then re-signed on December 26; waived on January 5)	Telekom Baskets Bonn
Jawad Williams	September 23	Cleveland Cavaliers (waived on December 27)	
Steve Novak	September 24	Dallas Mavericks	Los Angeles Clippers
Shawne Williams	September 24	New York Knicks	Dallas Mavericks
Jerry Stackhouse	October 23	Miami Heat	Milwaukee Bucks
Fabricio Oberto	October 25	Portland Trail Blazers (retired on November 4)	Washington Wizards
Signed in the regular season
Player	Signed	New team	Former team
Sean Marks	November 6	Portland Trail Blazers	New Orleans Hornets
Chris Quinn	November 8	San Antonio Spurs	New Jersey Nets
Sundiata Gaines	November 12	Minnesota Timberwolves (waived on January 4)	Utah Jazz
Earl Barron	November 16	Phoenix Suns (waived on December 21)	New York Knicks
Danny Green	November 17	San Antonio Spurs (waived on November 23)	Cleveland Cavaliers
Alonzo Gee	November 23	Washington Wizards (waived on December 20)	San Antonio Spurs
Erick Dampier	November 23	Miami Heat	Dallas Mavericks
Ime Udoka	November 24	San Antonio Spurs (waived on January 5)	Sacramento Kings
John Lucas III	November 26	Chicago Bulls (waived on January 4)	Shanghai Sharks
Brian Skinner	December 2	Milwaukee Bucks	Los Angeles Clippers
Damien Wilkins	December 3	Atlanta Hawks (waived on January 5)	Minnesota Timberwolves
Acie Law	December 10	Golden State Warriors	Memphis Grizzlies
Lester Hudson	December 20	Washington Wizards (previously waived on November 22, waived again on January 5)	
Ike Diogu	December 22	Los Angeles Clippers	Did not play in the 2009–10 season due to injury
Alonzo Gee	December 28	Cleveland Cavaliers	Washington Wizards
Peja Stojaković	January 24	Dallas Mavericks	Toronto Raptors
Damien Wilkins	January 28	Atlanta Hawks (previously signed two 10-day contracts)	
Sundiata Gaines	February 2	Toronto Raptors (previously signed two 10-day contracts)	Minnesota Timberwolves
Zabian Dowdell	February 6	Phoenix Suns (previously signed two 10-day contracts)	Tulsa 66ers
Jason Williams	February 7	Memphis Grizzlies	Orlando Magic
Jeff Adrien	February 25	Golden State Warriors (previously waived on December 10)	Rio Grande Valley Vipers
Mustafa Shakur	February 28	Washington Wizards (previously signed two 10-day contracts)	Rio Grande Valley Vipers
Jared Jeffries	March 1	New York Knicks	Houston Rockets
Derrick Brown	March 1	New York Knicks	Charlotte Bobcats
Troy Murphy	March 2	Boston Celtics	New Jersey Nets
Mike Bibby	March 2	Miami Heat	Washington Wizards
Corey Brewer	March 3	Dallas Mavericks	Minnesota Timberwolves
Dominic McGuire	March 3	Charlotte Bobcats (previously waived on February 24)	
Al Thornton	March 3	Golden State Warriors	Washington Wizards
Rasual Butler	March 3	Chicago Bulls	Los Angeles Clippers
Aleksandar Pavlović	March 3	Boston Celtics	New Orleans Hornets
Steve Novak	March 4	San Antonio Spurs (previously signed two 10-day contracts)	Reno Bighorns
Leon Powe	March 5	Memphis Grizzlies	Cleveland Cavaliers
Carlos Arroyo	March 6	Boston Celtics	Miami Heat
Chris Johnson	March 14	Portland Trail Blazers	Dakota Wizards
Danny Green	March 16	San Antonio Spurs	Reno Bighorns
Sundiata Gaines	March 20	New Jersey Nets (previously signed two 10-day contracts)	
John Lucas III	March 20	Chicago Bulls (previously waived on January 4)	
Jannero Pargo	March 20	Chicago Bulls	
Da'Sean Butler	March 25	San Antonio Spurs	Miami Heat
Garrett Temple	March 27	Charlotte Bobcats (previously signed two 10-day contracts)	Erie BayHawks
Patrick Ewing Jr.	April 4	New Orleans Hornets (previously signed two 10-day contracts)	Sioux Falls Skyforce
Robert Vaden	April 9	Oklahoma City Thunder	Tulsa 66ers
Mario West	April 10	New Jersey Nets (previously signed two 10-day contracts)	Maine Red Claws
Marcus Cousin	April 11	Houston Rockets	Austin Toros
Magnum Rolle	April 11	Atlanta Hawks	Reno Bighorns
Earl Barron	April 12	Portland Trail Blazers	Phoenix Suns
Trey Johnson	April 13	Los Angeles Lakers	Bakersfield Jam

==== 10-day contracts ====
Date	Team	D-League Team	Player	Second contract
January 5	Los Angeles Clippers	-	Jarron Collins	January 15
January 8	Atlanta Hawks	-	Damien Wilkins	January 18*
January 9	Phoenix Suns	Tulsa 66ers	Zabian Dowdell**	January 27*
January 10	Dallas Mavericks	-	Aleksandar Pavlović	January 20
January 13	Toronto Raptors	-	Sundiata Gaines	January 24 (waived on January 26)
January 16	San Antonio Spurs	Tulsa 66ers	Larry Owens**	January 26
January 22	Washington Wizards	Rio Grande Valley Vipers	Mustafa Shakur**	February 12*
January 24	Portland Trail Blazers	Dakota Wizards	Chris Johnson**	Not re-signed
January 25	Milwaukee Bucks	Erie BayHawks	Garrett Temple**	February 5
January 26	Toronto Raptors	Bakersfield Jam	Trey Johnson**	February 6
February 1	New Jersey Nets	Utah Flash	Orien Greene**	Not re-signed
February 4	New Orleans Hornets	-	Aleksandar Pavlović	Not re-signed
February 8	San Antonio Spurs	Reno Bighorns	Steve Novak**	February 22*
February 21	Memphis Grizzlies	-	Rodney Carney	Not re-signed
February 24	Boston Celtics	Dakota Wizards	Chris Johnson**	Not re-signed
February 28	New Jersey Nets	-	Sundiata Gaines	March 10*
March 1	Milwaukee Bucks	-	Earl Barron	March 11
March 1	Portland Trail Blazers	-	Jarron Collins	March 11
March 4	San Antonio Spurs	Iowa Energy	Othyus Jeffers**	Not re-signed
March 6	Charlotte Bobcats	Erie BayHawks	Garrett Temple**	March 16*
March 9	Utah Jazz	Austin Toros	Marcus Cousin**	Not re-signed
March 9	New Orleans Hornets	Rio Grande Valley Vipers	Jerel McNeal**	Not re-signed
March 17	Washington Wizards	Iowa Energy	Othyus Jeffers**	March 27
March 23	Houston Rockets	-	Mike Harris	March 2
March 26	New Orleans Hornets	Sioux Falls Skyforce	Patrick Ewing Jr.**	April 4*
March 30	Utah Jazz	Austin Toros	Kyle Weaver**	Not re-signed
March 31	New Jersey Nets	Maine Red Claws	Mario West**	April 10*
April 5	Philadelphia 76ers	Texas Legends	Antonio Daniels**	
April 6	Washington Wizards	Tulsa 66ers	Larry Owens**	

*: Indicates the player getting signed for the remainder of the season.
**: Gatorade NBA D-League call-up.

=== Released ===
==== Waived ====
Player	Date	Team
Keyon Dooling	June 28	New Jersey Nets
James Jones (since re-signed)	June 29	Miami Heat
Ryan Gomes	June 29	Portland Trail Blazers
Rob Kurz	June 30	Chicago Bulls
Chris Richard	June 30	Chicago Bulls
Lester Hudson	July 1	Memphis Grizzlies
Taylor Griffin	July 26	Phoenix Suns
Malik Hairston	July 29	San Antonio Spurs
Kyle Weaver	July 30	Oklahoma City Thunder
Delonte West	August 3	Minnesota Timberwolves
Rasheed Wallace	August 10	Boston Celtics
Dwayne Jones	August 13	Toronto Raptors
Coby Karl	August 15	Denver Nuggets
Brian Butch	August 15	Denver Nuggets
Sean May	September 7	New Jersey Nets
Greg Stiemsma	September 12	Minnesota Timberwolves
Erick Dampier	September 14	Charlotte Bobcats
Maurice Ager	November 11	Minnesota Timberwolves
Garrett Temple	November 11	San Antonio Spurs
Joe Alexander	November 13	New Orleans Hornets
Matt Janning	November 16	Phoenix Suns
Alonzo Gee	November 16	San Antonio Spurs
Lester Hudson	November 22	Washington Wizards
Danny Green	November 23	San Antonio Spurs
Jerry Stackhouse	November 23	Miami Heat
Antoine Wright	November 29	Sacramento Kings
Darington Hobson	December 2	Milwaukee Bucks
Acie Law	December 4	Memphis Grizzlies
Jeff Adrien	December 10	Golden State Warriors
Alonzo Gee	December 20	Washington Wizards
Earl Barron	December 21	Phoenix Suns
Jawad Williams	December 27	Cleveland Cavaliers
Jarron Collins	January 3	Los Angeles Clippers
Rodney Carney	January 4	Golden State Warriors
Pops Mensah-Bonsu	January 4	New Orleans Hornets
John Lucas III	January 4	Chicago Bulls
Sundiata Gaines	January 4	Minnesota Timberwolves
Lester Hudson	January 5	Washington Wizards
Ime Udoka	January 5	San Antonio Spurs
Ronald Dupree	January 5	Toronto Raptors
Damien Wilkins	January 5	Atlanta Hawks
Brian Skinner	January 5	Milwaukee Bucks
Steve Novak	January 5	Dallas Mavericks
Peja Stojaković	January 20	Toronto Raptors
Jason Williams	January 26	Orlando Magic
Leon Powe	February 24	Cleveland Cavaliers
Derrick Brown	February 24	Charlotte Bobcats
Sherron Collins	February 24	Charlotte Bobcats
Dominic McGuire	February 24	Charlotte Bobcats
Jared Jeffries	February 25	Houston Rockets
Troy Murphy	February 27	Golden State Warriors
Kelenna Azubuike	February 28	New York Knicks
Mike Bibby	February 28	Washington Wizards
Rasual Butler	February 28	Los Angeles Clippers
Morris Peterson	February 28	Charlotte Bobcats
Corey Brewer	March 1	New York Knicks
Carlos Arroyo	March 1	Miami Heat
Al Thornton	March 1	Washington Wizards
Eddy Curry	March 1	Minnesota Timberwolves
Sean Marks	March 3	Charlotte Bobcats
Luther Head	March 19	Sacramento Kings
Quinton Ross	March 31	New Jersey Nets
Cartier Martin	April 6	Washington Wizards
DeMarre Carroll	April 11	Houston Rockets

==== Training camp cuts ====
All players listed did not make the final roster.

Atlanta Hawks	Boston Celtics	Charlotte Bobcats	Chicago Bulls	Cleveland Cavaliers
Evan Brock; Richard Delk; Ricardo Marsh	Tony Gaffney; Tiny Gallon; Chris Johnson; Stephane Lasme; Jamar Smith; Mario West	Javaris Crittenton; Darius Miles; Matt Rogers	Chris Richard; John Lucas; Kyle Weaver; Roger Powell	Danny Green; Cedric Jackson; Tasmin Mitchell; Greg Stiemsma; Loren Woods
Dallas Mavericks	Denver Nuggets	Detroit Pistons	Golden State Warriors	Houston Rockets
Dee Brown; Adam Haluska; Rashad McCants; Sean Williams	Eric Boateng; Shane Edwards; Courtney Sims	Ike Diogu; Vernon Hamilton	Cheyne Gadson; Vernon Goodridge; James Mays; Aaron Miles	Antonio Anderson; Jordan Eglseder; Mike Harris; Alexander Johnson; Jerel McNeal; Patrick Sullivan
Indiana Pacers	Los Angeles Clippers	Los Angeles Lakers	Memphis Grizzlies	Miami Heat
Lance Allred; Magnum Rolle	Marqus Blakely; Stephen Dennis; Jon Scheyer; Jake Voskuhl	Russell Hicks; Trey Johnson; Drew Naymick; Anthony Roberson	Josh Davis; Luke Jackson; Tre Kelley; Kenny Thomas; Damien Wilkins	Patrick Beverley; Da'Sean Butler; Mickell Gladness; Kenny Hasbrouck; Anthony Mason, Jr; Shavlik Randolph
Milwaukee Bucks	Minnesota Timberwolves	New Jersey Nets	New Orleans Hornets	New York Knicks
Tiny Gallon; Tory Jackson; Billy Rush; Chris Kramer; Brian Skinner	DerMarr Johnson; Jason Hart; John Thomas	Andre Brown; Eddie Gill; Brian Zoubek	Curtis Jerrells; Jannero Pargo; Mustafa Shakur; D. J. Strawberry; Darryl Watkins	Patrick Ewing Jr.
Oklahoma City Thunder	Orlando Magic	Philadelphia 76ers	Phoenix Suns	Portland Trail Blazers
Tweety Carter; Jerome Dyson; Longar Longar; Elijah Millsap	Stanley Robinson	James Florence; Trent Plaisted; Chris Quinn	Chucky Atkins; Zabian Dowdell; Dwayne Jones	Eric Williams; Steven Hill; Dwight Lewis; Jeff Pendergraph; Raymond Sykes; Seth Tarver
Sacramento Kings	San Antonio Spurs	Toronto Raptors	Utah Jazz	Washington Wizards
Connor Atchley; Joe Crawford; J. R. Giddens; Marcus Landry; Donald Sloan	Marcus Cousin; Thomas Gardner; James Gist; Kevin Palmer; Kirk Penney	Ronald Dupree	Sundiata Gaines; Othyus Jeffers; Demetris Nichols; Ryan Thompson	Mardy Collins; Sean Marks; Adam Morrison; Kevin Palmer

=== NBA Development League assignments ===
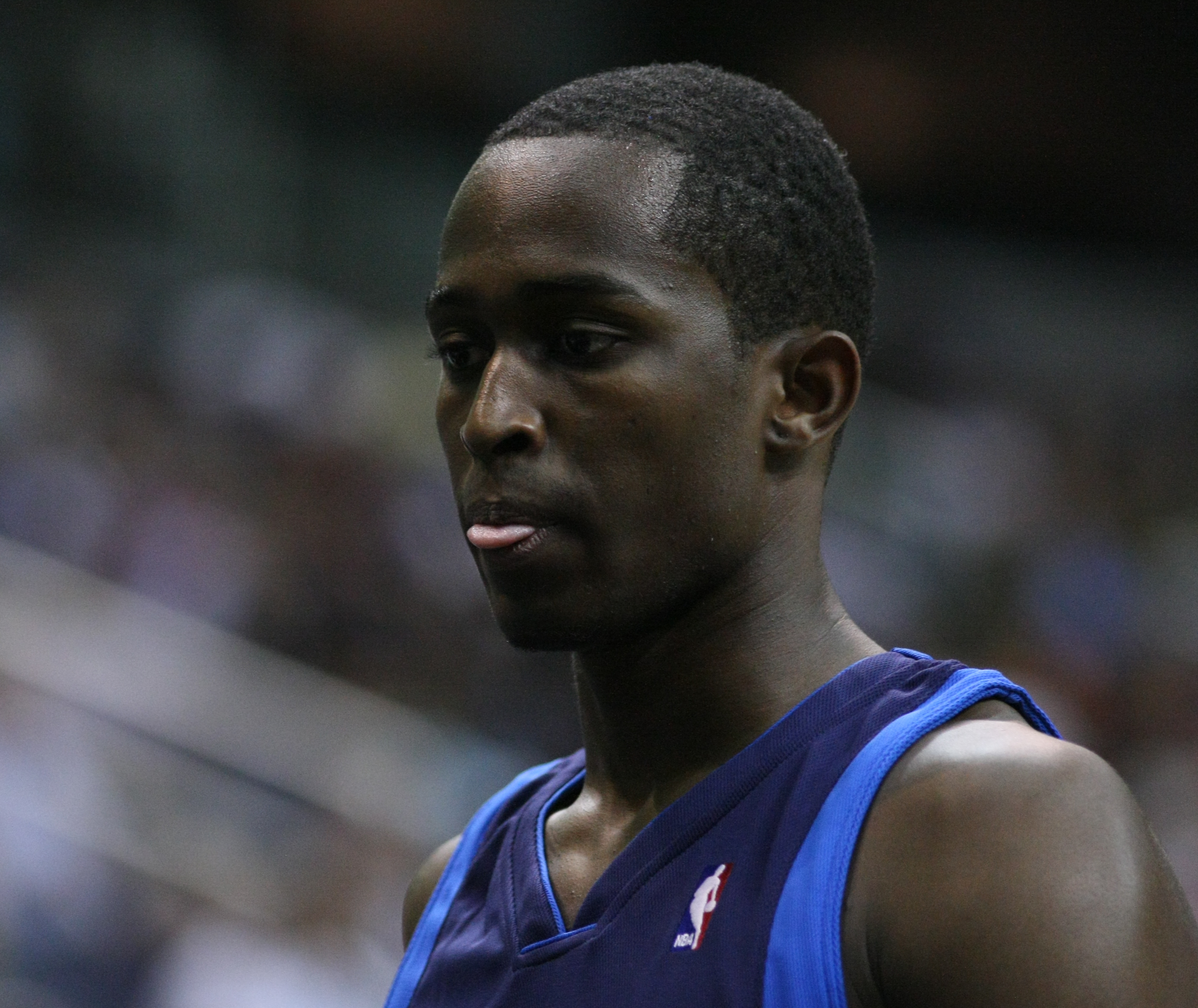
Rodrigue Beaubois was assigned to the Texas Legends.

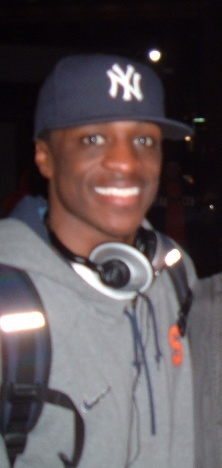
Jonny Flynn was twice assigned to the Sioux Falls Skyforce.

Each NBA team can assign two first or second year players to its affiliated NBA Development League team. A player can be assigned to the Development League only three times in a season.

Player	Date assigned	Team	Assigned to	Date recalled
Patrick Patterson	November 9	Houston Rockets	Rio Grande Valley Vipers	December 13
Solomon Alabi	November 15	Toronto Raptors	Erie Bayhawks	December 9
Gani Lawal	November 16	Phoenix Suns	Iowa Energy	December 18
Christian Eyenga	November 18	Cleveland Cavaliers	Erie Bayhawks	January 2
Ed Davis	November 22	Toronto Raptors	Erie Bayhawks	November 29
Cole Aldrich	November 24	Oklahoma City Thunder	Tulsa 66ers	December 6
Dexter Pittman	November 26	Miami Heat	Sioux Falls Skyforce	December 20
Terrence Williams	November 26	New Jersey Nets	Springfield Armor	December 7
Hassan Whiteside	November 29	Sacramento Kings	Reno Bighorns	January 9
Craig Brackins	November 30	Philadelphia 76ers	Springfield Armor	December 12
Rodrigue Beaubois	November 30	Dallas Mavericks	Texas Legends	January 4
Dominique Jones	November 30	Dallas Mavericks	Texas Legends	January 2
Jonny Flynn	December 1	Minnesota Timberwolves	Sioux Falls Skyforce	December 4
Daniel Orton	December 1	Orlando Magic	New Mexico Thunderbirds	December 6
Luke Babbitt	December 8	Portland Trail Blazers	Idaho Stampede	December 18
Jonny Flynn (2)	December 8	Minnesota Timberwolves	Sioux Falls Skyforce	December 13
Sherron Collins	December 9	Charlotte Bobcats	Maine Red Claws	December 21
Byron Mullens	December 10	Oklahoma City Thunder	Tulsa 66ers	December 12
DeMarre Carroll	December 14	Memphis Grizzlies	Dakota Wizards	January 5
Pape Sy	December 27	Atlanta Hawks	Utah Flash	March 1
Samardo Samuels	December 27	Cleveland Cavaliers	Erie Bayhawks	December 31
Devin Ebanks	December 27	Los Angeles Lakers	Bakersfield Jam	January 9
Jeremy Lin	December 28	Golden State Warriors	Reno Bighorns	January 3
Cole Aldrich (2)	December 30	Oklahoma City Thunder	Tulsa 66ers	February 2
Garret Siler	January 2	Phoenix Suns	Iowa Energy	January 9
Solomon Alabi (2)	January 6	Toronto Raptors	Erie Bayhawks	January 13
Dexter Pittman (2)	January 6	Miami Heat	Sioux Falls Skyforce	February 14
Hamady N'Diaye	January 6	Washington Wizards	Dakota Wizards	February 4
Jeremy Lin (2)	January 9	Golden State Warriors	Reno Bighorns	February 6
Avery Bradley	January 14	Boston Celtics	Maine Red Claws	February 7
Craig Brackins (2)	January 15	Philadelphia 76ers	Springfield Armor	February 7
Ishmael Smith	January 17	Houston Rockets	Rio Grande Valley Vipers	January 24
James Anderson	January 26	San Antonio Spurs	Austin Toros	January 29
James Johnson	January 27	Chicago Bulls	Iowa Energy	February 14
Armon Johnson	January 28	Portland Trail Blazers	Idaho Stampede	February 22
Ishmael Smith (2)	February 1	Houston Rockets	Rio Grande Valley Vipers	February 7
Byron Mullens (2)	February 3	Oklahoma City Thunder	Tulsa 66ers	February 25
Willie Warren	February 3	Los Angeles Clippers	Bakersfield Jam	February 21
James Anderson (2)	February 7	San Antonio Spurs	Austin Toros	February 23
Larry Sanders	February 21	Milwaukee Bucks	Fort Wayne Mad Ants	February 28
Luke Babbitt (2)	March 3	Portland Trail Blazers	Idaho Stampede	March 28
Willie Warren (2)	March 3	Los Angeles Clippers	Bakersfield Jam	March 22
Jeremy Evans	March 5	Utah Jazz	Utah Flash	March 6
Solomon Alabi (3)	March 9	Toronto Raptors	Erie Bayhawks	April 4
Byron Mullens (3)	March 10	Oklahoma City Thunder	Tulsa 66ers	March 27
Ben Uzoh	March 14	New Jersey Nets	Springfield Armor	March 23
Jeremy Lin (3)	March 17	Golden State Warriors	Reno Bighorns	March 27
Hasheem Thabeet	March 21	Houston Rockets	Rio Grande Valley Vipers	April 11
Willie Warren (3)	March 24	Los Angeles Clippers	Bakersfield Jam	April 11
Craig Brackins (3)	March 24	Philadelphia 76ers	Springfield Armor	April 4
Derrick Caracter	March 29	Los Angeles Lakers	Bakersfield Jam	April 5
Da'Sean Butler	March 31	San Antonio Spurs	Austin Toros	April 4
Cole Aldrich (3)	March 31	Oklahoma City Thunder	Tulsa 66ers	April 13
Danny Green	April 2	San Antonio Spurs	Austin Toros	April 4
Derrick Caracter (2)	April 6	Los Angeles Lakers	Bakersfield Jam	April 13
Robert Vaden	April 9	Oklahoma City Thunder	Tulsa 66ers	April 20

() Indicates the number of assignments a player has made.

=== Going overseas ===
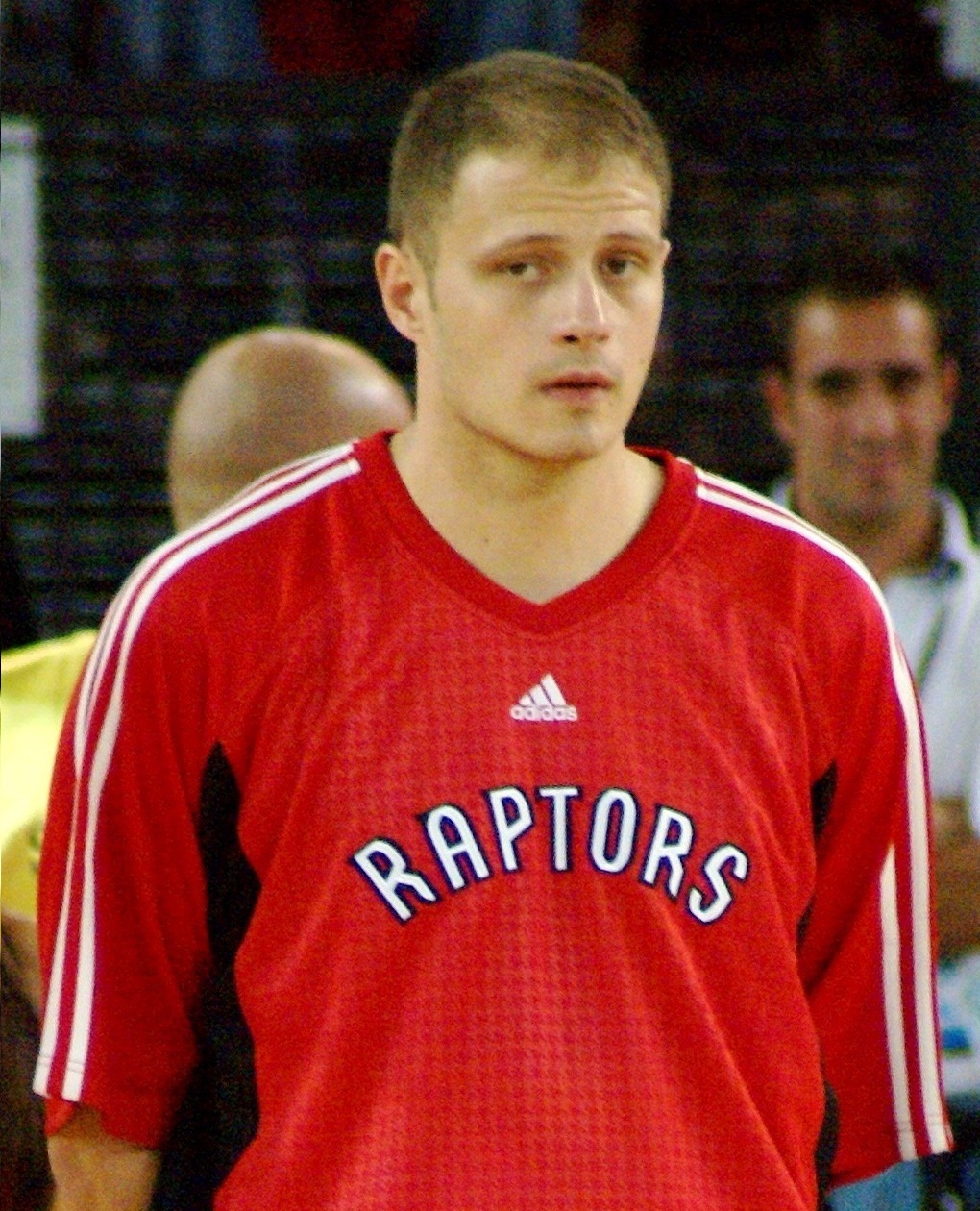
Radoslav Nesterović was signed by Greek club Olympiacos.

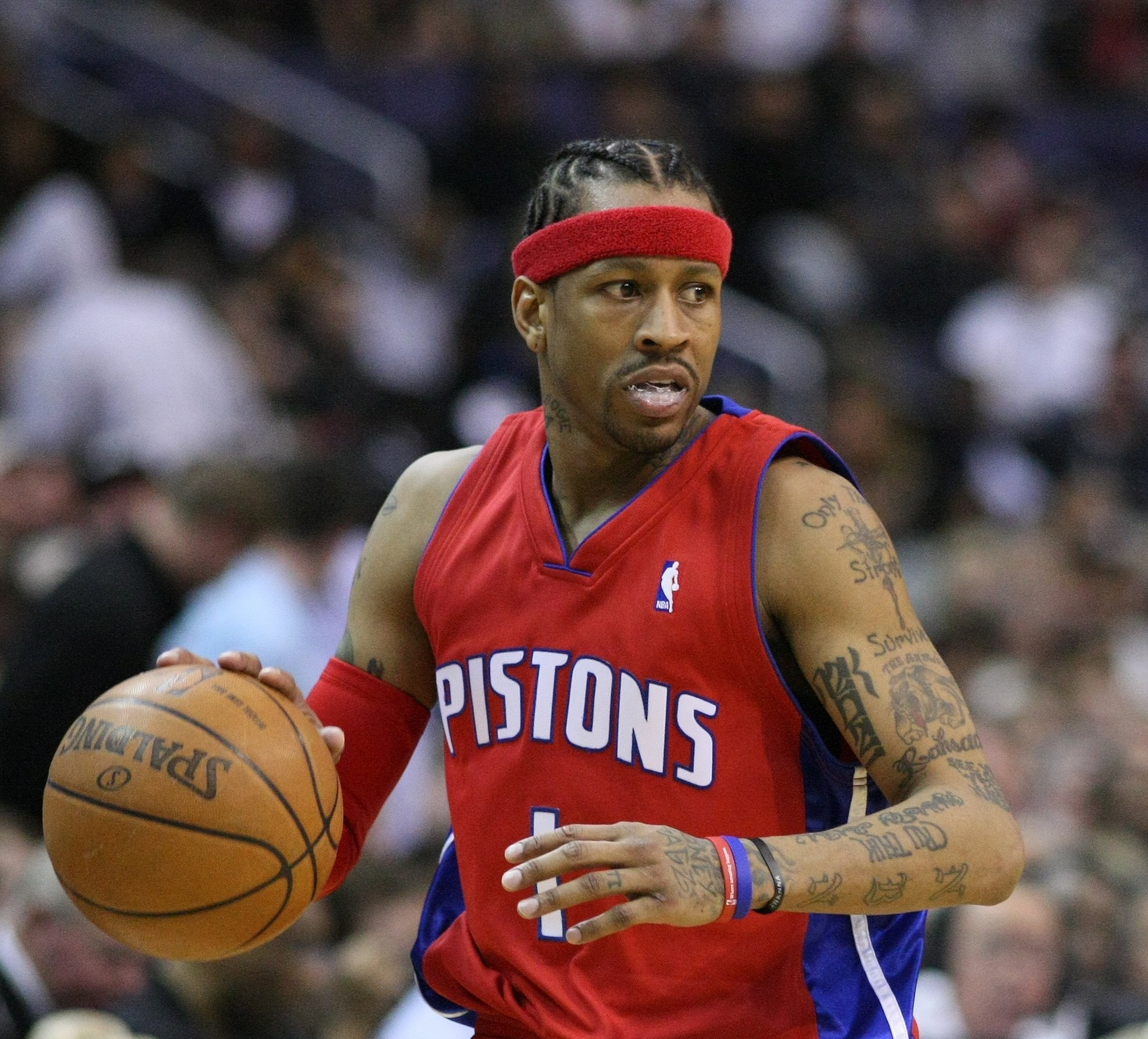
Allen Iverson was signed by Turkish club Beşiktaş Cola Turka.

The following players were on the NBA roster at the end of the previous season and either became a free agent or waived before signed by a team from other leagues.

Player	Signed	New team	Former team	Ref.
(Spain) Sergio Rodríguez	July 1	Real Madrid (Spain)	New York Knicks	
(United States) Malik Hairston	July 29	Montepaschi Siena (Italy)	San Antonio Spurs (waived on July 29)	
(Slovenia) Radoslav Nesterović	July 31	Olympiacos (Greece)	Toronto Raptors	
(United States) Rob Kurz	August 3	CB Granada (Spain)	Chicago Bulls (waived on June 30)	
(United States) Taylor Griffin	August 3	Belgacom Liège (Belgium)	Phoenix Suns (waived on July 26)	
(France) Yakhouba Diawara	August 10	Enel Brindisi (Italy)	Miami Heat	
(United States) Marcus Williams	August 10	Enisey Krasnoyarsk (Russia)	Memphis Grizzlies	
(Ukraine) Oleksiy Pecherov	August 16	Armani Jeans Milano (Italy)	Minnesota Timberwolves	
(United States) Travis Diener	August 17	Banco di Sardegna Sassari (Italy)	Portland Trail Blazers	
(Australia) Nathan Jawai	August 19	KK Partizan (Serbia)	Minnesota Timberwolves	
(United States) Randolph Morris	August 29	Beijing Ducks (China)	Atlanta Hawks	
(United States) James Singleton	September 6	Xinjiang Flying Tigers (China)	Washington Wizards	
(United States) Bobby Brown	September 22	Asseco Prokom Gdynia (Poland)	Los Angeles Clippers	
(United States) Coby Karl	September 23	CB Granada (Spain)	Denver Nuggets (waived on August 15)	
(United States) Patrick O'Bryant	September 28	Fujian Xunxing (China)	Toronto Raptors	
(Slovenia) Primož Brezec	September 29	Krasnye Krylya Samara (Russia)	Milwaukee Bucks	
(United States) Tony Gaffney	October 5	Türk Telekom (Turkey)	Boston Celtics (waived on October 4)	
(United States) Greg Stiemsma	October 5	Türk Telekom (Turkey)	Cleveland Cavaliers (waived on October 2)	
(United States) J. R. Giddens	October 13	Asseco Prokom Gdynia (Poland)	Sacramento Kings (waived on October 4)	
(United States) Oliver Lafayette	October 14	KK Partizan (Serbia)	Boston Celtics (waived on September 25)	
(United States) Mike Harris	October 24	Petrochimi (Iran)	Houston Rockets (waived on October 18)	
(United States) Allen Iverson	October 30	Beşiktaş Cola Turka (Turkey)	Philadelphia 76ers	

== NBA draft ==
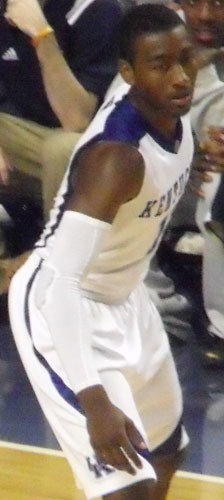
John Wall was selected first by the Washington Wizards.

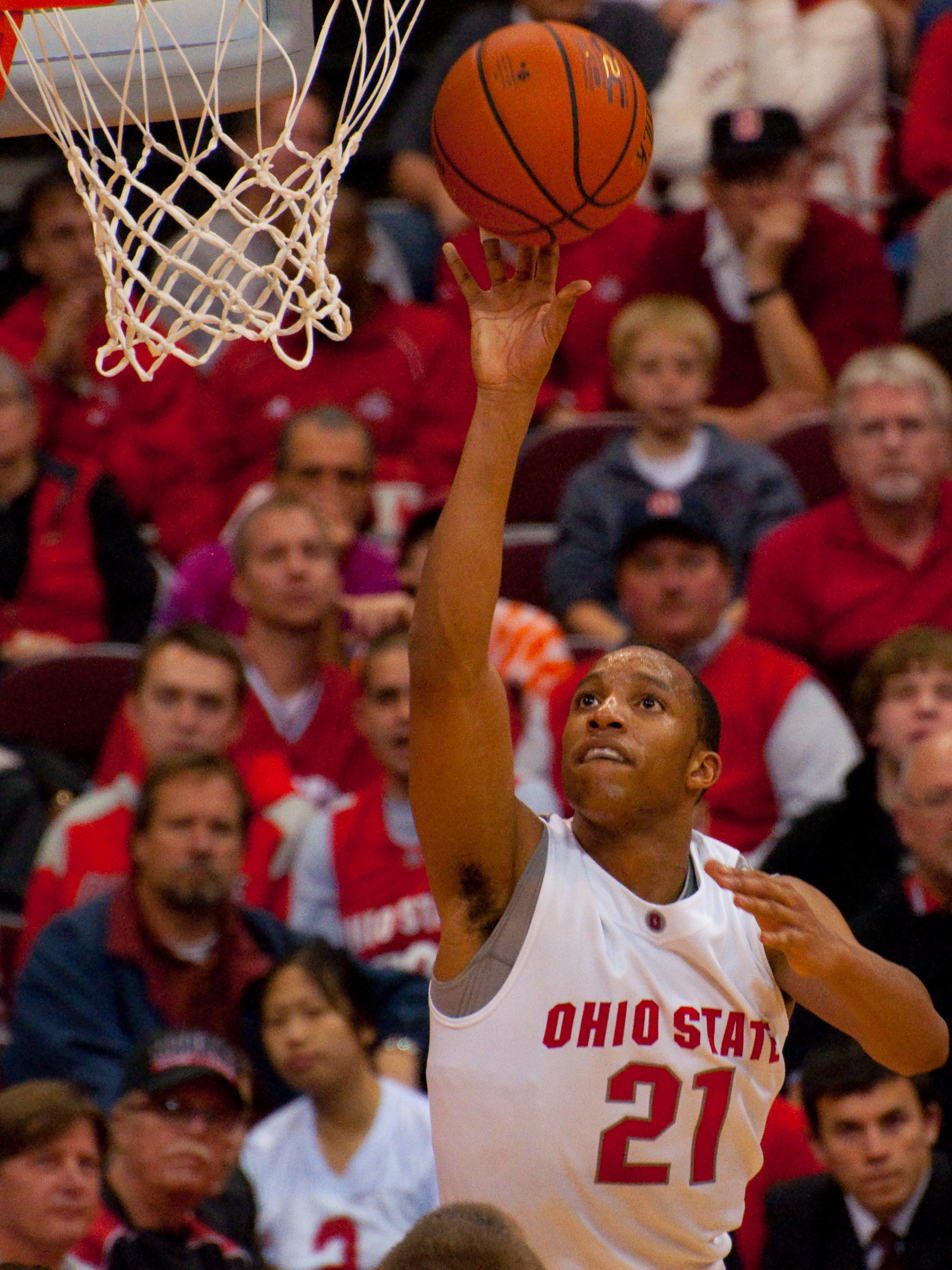
Evan Turner was selected second by the Philadelphia 76ers.

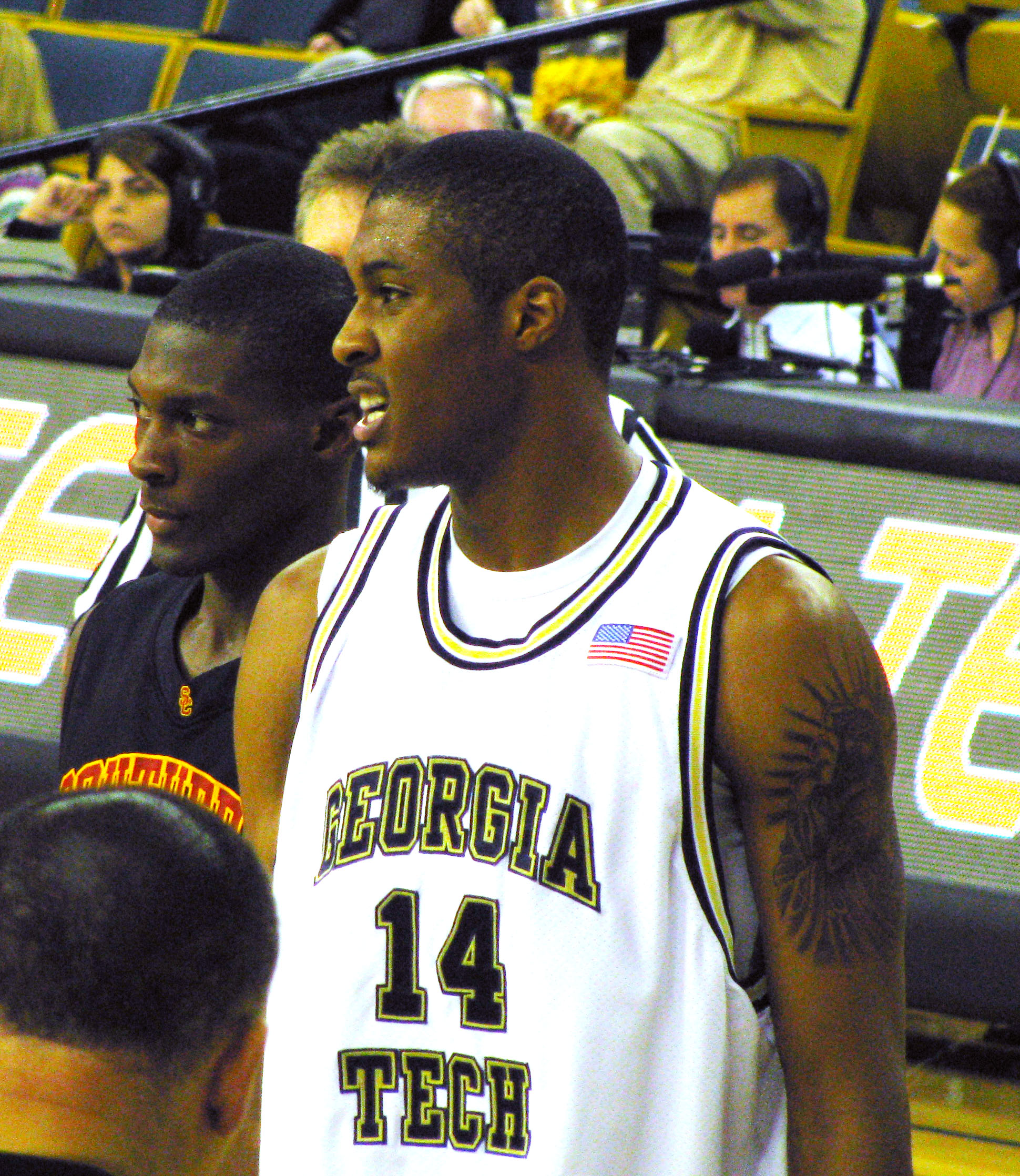
Derrick Favors was selected third by the New Jersey Nets.

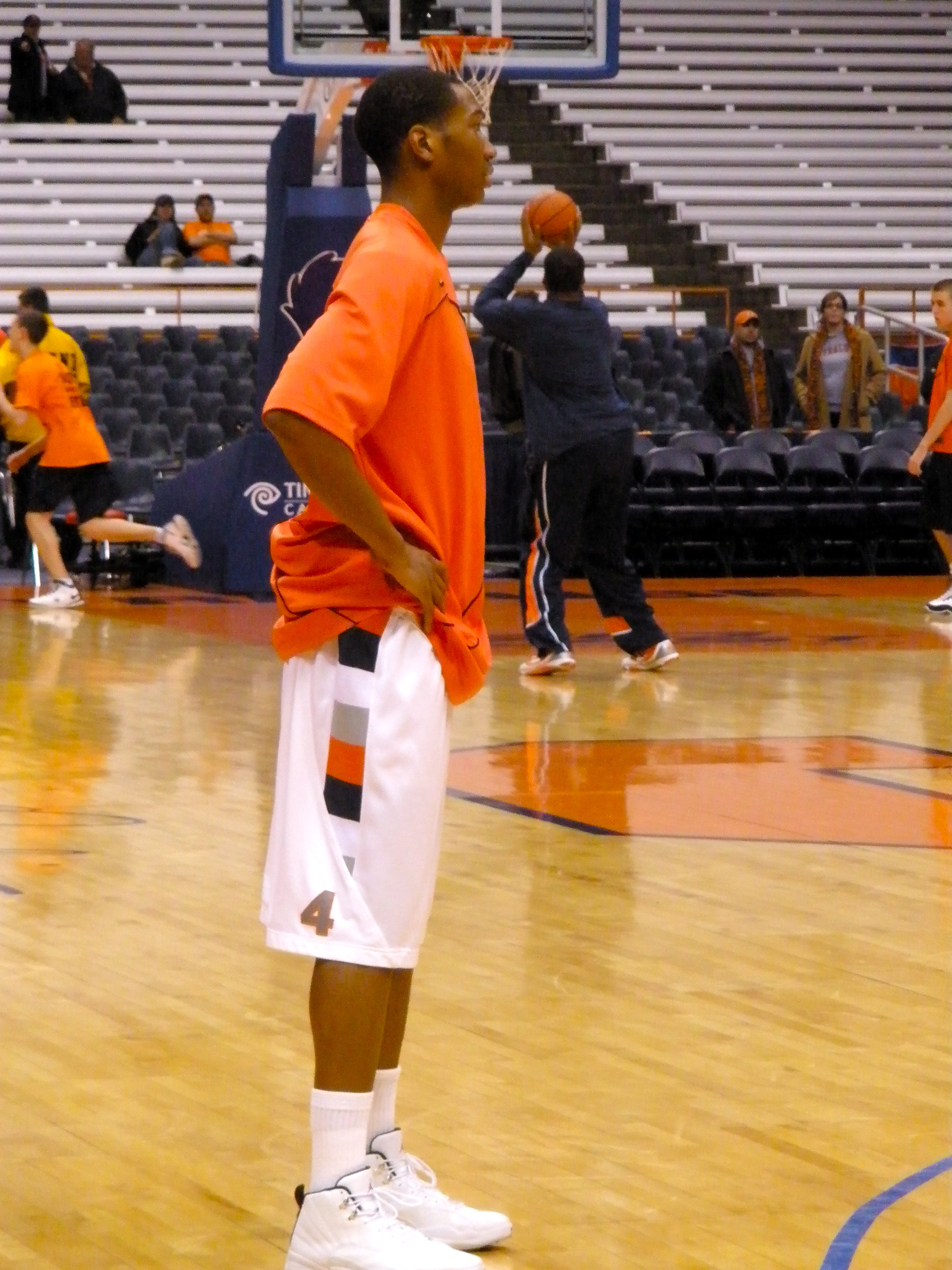
Wesley Johnson was selected fourth by the Minnesota Timberwolves.

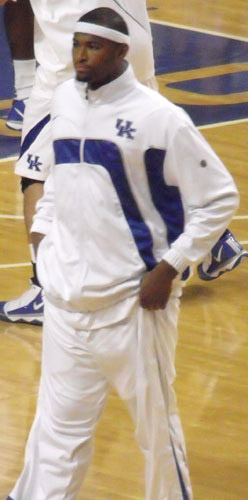
DeMarcus Cousins was selected fifth by the Sacramento Kings.

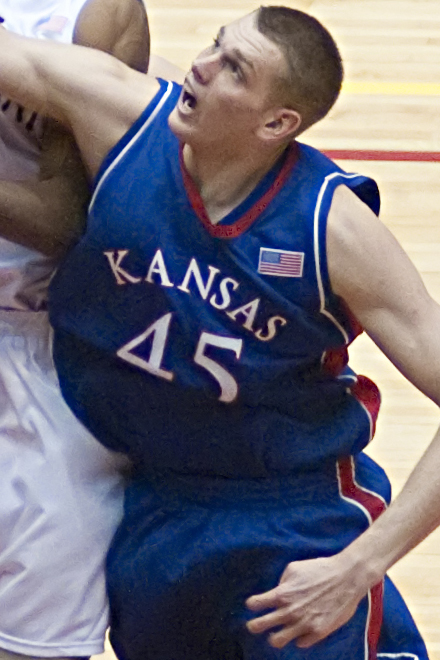
Cole Aldrich was selected eleventh by the New Orleans Hornets and later traded to the Oklahoma City Thunder.

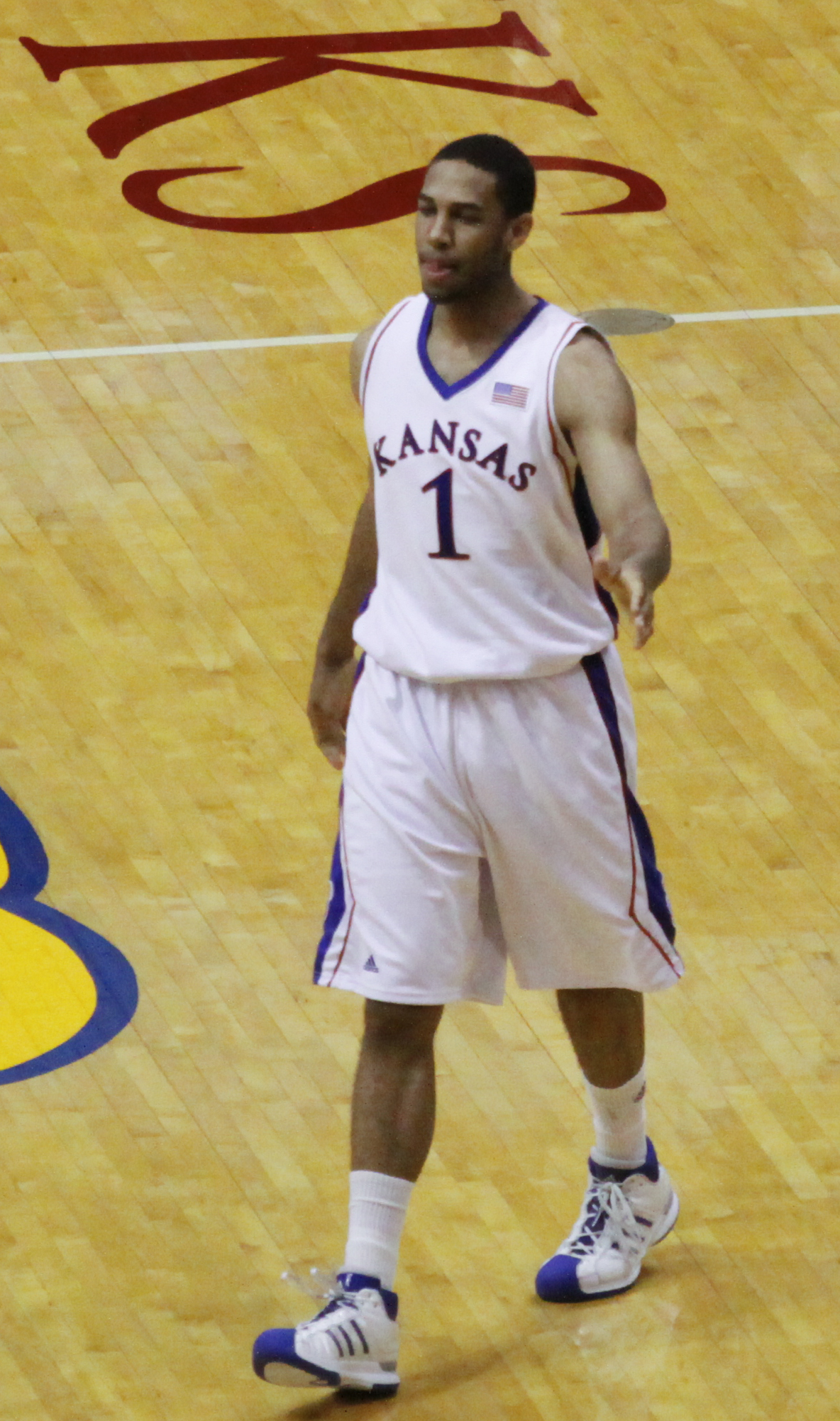
Xavier Henry was selected twelfth by the Memphis Grizzlies.

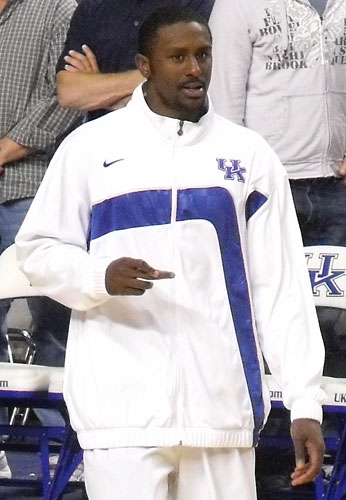
Patrick Patterson was selected fourteenth by the Houston Rockets.

The 2010 NBA Draft was held on June 24, 2010, at Madison Square Garden in New York City. 60 players were selected in the draft. All of the 30 first-round picks signed a rookie contract and was named in the 2010–11 season opening day roster. 21 of the 30 second-round picks also signed a rookie contract, but 4 of them were waived before the start of the season and became free agents. 9 other second-round picks were unsigned but their draft rights are still held by the NBA teams.

=== First round ===
Pick	Player	Signed	Team	School/club team	Ref.
1	(United States) John Wall	July 8	Washington Wizards	Kentucky Wildcats (Fr.)	
2	(United States) Evan Turner	July 14	Philadelphia 76ers	Ohio State Buckeyes (Jr.)	
3	(United States) Derrick Favors	July 15	New Jersey Nets	Georgia Tech Yellow Jackets (Fr.)	
4	(United States) Wesley Johnson	July 12	Minnesota Timberwolves	Syracuse Orange (Jr.)	
5	(United States) DeMarcus Cousins	July 7	Sacramento Kings	Kentucky Wildcats (Fr.)	
6	(United States) Ekpe Udoh	July 7	Golden State Warriors	Baylor Bears (Jr.)	
7	(United States) Greg Monroe	July 6	Detroit Pistons	Georgetown Hoyas (So.)	
8	(United States) Al-Farouq Aminu	July 9	Los Angeles Clippers	Wake Forest Demon Deacons (So.)	
9	(United States) Gordon Hayward	July 1	Utah Jazz	Butler Bulldogs (So.)	
10	(United States) Paul George	July 1	Indiana Pacers	Fresno State Bulldogs (So.)	
11	(United States) Cole Aldrich	August 8	Oklahoma City Thunder (acquired from New Orleans)	Kansas Jayhawks (Jr.)	
12	(United States) Xavier Henry	September 24	Memphis Grizzlies	Kansas Jayhawks (Fr.)	
13	(United States) Ed Davis	July 6	Toronto Raptors	North Carolina Tar Heels (So.)	
14	(United States) Patrick Patterson	July 13	Houston Rockets	Kentucky Wildcats (Jr.)	
15	(United States) Larry Sanders	July 8	Milwaukee Bucks	VCU Rams (Jr.)	
16	(United States) Luke Babbitt	July 6	Portland Trail Blazers (acquired from Minnesota)	Nevada Wolf Pack (So.)	
17	(France) Kevin Seraphin	July 30	Washington Wizards (acquired from Chicago)	Cholet Basket (France) (born 1989)	
18	(United States) Eric Bledsoe	July 9	Los Angeles Clippers (acquired from Oklahoma City)	Kentucky Wildcats (Fr.)	
19	(United States) Avery Bradley	July 2	Boston Celtics	Texas Longhorns (Fr.)	
20	(United States) James Anderson	July 23	San Antonio Spurs	Oklahoma State Cowboys (Jr.)	
21	(United States) Craig Brackins	July 8	New Orleans Hornets (acquired from Oklahoma City)	Iowa State Cyclones (Jr.)	
22	(United States) Elliot Williams	July 7	Portland Trail Blazers	Memphis Tigers (So.)	
23	(United States) Trevor Booker	July 8	Washington Wizards (acquired from Minnesota)	Clemson Tigers (Sr.)	
24	(United States) Damion James	July 15	New Jersey (acquired from Atlanta)	Texas Longhorns (Sr.)	
25	(United States) Dominique Jones	July 13	Dallas Mavericks (acquired from Memphis)	South Florida Bulls (Jr.)	
26	(United States) Quincy Pondexter	July 8	New Orleans Hornets (acquired from Oklahoma City)	Washington Huskies (Sr.)	
27	(United States) Jordan Crawford	July 9	Atlanta Hawks (acquired from New Jersey)	Xavier Musketeers (So.)	
28	(Venezuela) Greivis Vásquez	September 24	Memphis Grizzlies	Maryland Terrapins (Sr.)	
29	(United States) Daniel Orton	July 1	Orlando Magic	Kentucky Wildcats (Fr.)	
30	(United States) Lazar Hayward	July 12	Minnesota Timberwolves (acquired from Washington)	Marquette Golden Eagles (Sr.)	

=== Second round ===
Pick	Player	Signed	Team	School/club team	Ref.
31	(Germany) Tibor Pleiß	unsigned	Oklahoma City Thunder (acquired from New Jersey via Atlanta)	Brose Baskets (Germany) (born 1989)	
32	(United States) Dexter Pittman	July 16	Miami Heat	Texas Longhorns (Sr.)	
33	(United States) Hassan Whiteside	July 8	Sacramento Kings	Marshall Thundering Herd (Fr.)	
34	(United States) Armon Johnson	August 2	Portland Trail Blazers	Nevada Wolf Pack (Jr.)	
35	(Serbia) Nemanja Bjelica	unsigned	Minnesota Timberwolves (acquired from Washington)	KK Crvena zvezda (Serbia) (born 1988)	
36	(United States) Terrico White	August 13	Detroit Pistons	Ole Miss Rebels (So.)	
37	(United States) Darington Hobson	September 3	Milwaukee Bucks	New Mexico Lobos (Jr.)	
38	(Canada) Andy Rautins	August 12	New York Knicks	Syracuse Orange (Sr.)	
39	(United States) Landry Fields	August 26	New York Knicks	Stanford Cardinal (Sr.)	
40	(United States) Lance Stephenson	July 22	Indiana Pacers	Cincinnati Bearcats (Fr.)	
41	(United States) Jarvis Varnado	unsigned	Miami Heat	Mississippi State Bulldogs (Sr.)	
42	(United States) Da'Sean Butler	August 30 (waived on October 25)	Miami Heat	West Virginia Mountaineers (Sr.)	
43	(United States) Devin Ebanks	August 12	Los Angeles Lakers	West Virginia Mountaineers (So.)	
44	(Jamaica) Jerome Jordan	unsigned	New York Knicks (acquired from Milwaukee)	Tulsa Golden Hurricanes (Sr.)	
45	(Brazil) Paulão Prestes	unsigned	Minnesota Timberwolves	CB Murcia (Spain)	
46	(United States) Gani Lawal	August 2	Phoenix Suns	Georgia Tech Yellow Jackets (Jr.)	
47	(United States) Tiny Gallon	September 10 (waived on October 6)	Milwaukee Bucks	Oklahoma Sooners (Fr.)	
48	(United States) Latavious Williams	unsigned	Oklahoma City Thunder (acquired from Miami)	Tulsa 66ers (D-League) (born 1989)	
49	(United Kingdom) Ryan Richards	unsigned	San Antonio Spurs	CB Gran Canaria (Spain) (born 1991)	
50	(Nigeria) Solomon Alabi	July 8	Toronto Raptors (acquired from Dallas)	Florida State Seminoles (So.)	
51	(The Bahamas) Magnum Rolle	September 27 (waived on October 25)	Indiana Pacers (acquired from Oklahoma City)	Louisiana Tech Bulldogs (Sr.)	
52	(United States) Luke Harangody	August 10	Boston Celtics	Notre Dame Fighting Irish (Sr.)	
53	(France) Pape Sy	September 15	Atlanta Hawks	STB Le Havre (France) (born 1988)	
54	(United States) Willie Warren	July 13	Los Angeles Clippers	Oklahoma Sooners (So.)	
55	(United States) Jeremy Evans	July 1	Utah Jazz	Western Kentucky Hilltoppers (Sr.)	
56	(Senegal) Hamady N'Diaye	September 21	Washington Wizards (acquired from Minnesota)	Rutgers Scarlet Knights (Sr.)	
57	(United States) Ryan Reid	unsigned	Oklahoma City Thunder (acquired from Indiana)	Florida State Seminoles (Jr.)	
58	(United States) Derrick Caracter	August 13	Los Angeles Lakers	UTEP Miners (Jr.)	
59	(United States) Stanley Robinson	August 16 (waived on October 20)	Orlando Magic	Connecticut Huskies (Sr.)	
60	(United States) Dwayne Collins	unsigned	Phoenix Suns	Miami Hurricanes (Sr.)	

=== Unsigned draft picks ===
Pick	Player	Team	Note	Ref.
31	(Germany) Tibor Pleiß	Oklahoma City Thunder	Remained with Brose Baskets (Germany)	
35	(Serbia) Nemanja Bjelica	Minnesota Timberwolves	Signed with Caja Laboral (Spain)	
41	(United States) Jarvis Varnado	Miami Heat	Signed with Carmatic Pistoia (Italy)	
44	(Jamaica) Jerome Jordan	New York Knicks	Signed with KK Hemofarm (Serbia)	
45	(Brazil) Paulão Prestes	Minnesota Timberwolves	Signed with CB Granada (Spain)	
48	(United States) Latavious Williams	Oklahoma City Thunder	Remained with Tulsa 66ers (D-League)	
49	(United Kingdom) Ryan Richards	San Antonio Spurs	Remained with CB Gran Canaria (Spain)	
57	(United States) Ryan Reid	Oklahoma City Thunder	Signed with Tulsa 66ers (D-League)	
60	(United States) Dwayne Collins	Phoenix Suns	Signed with Pallacanestro Varese (Italy)	

=== Other draft picks ===
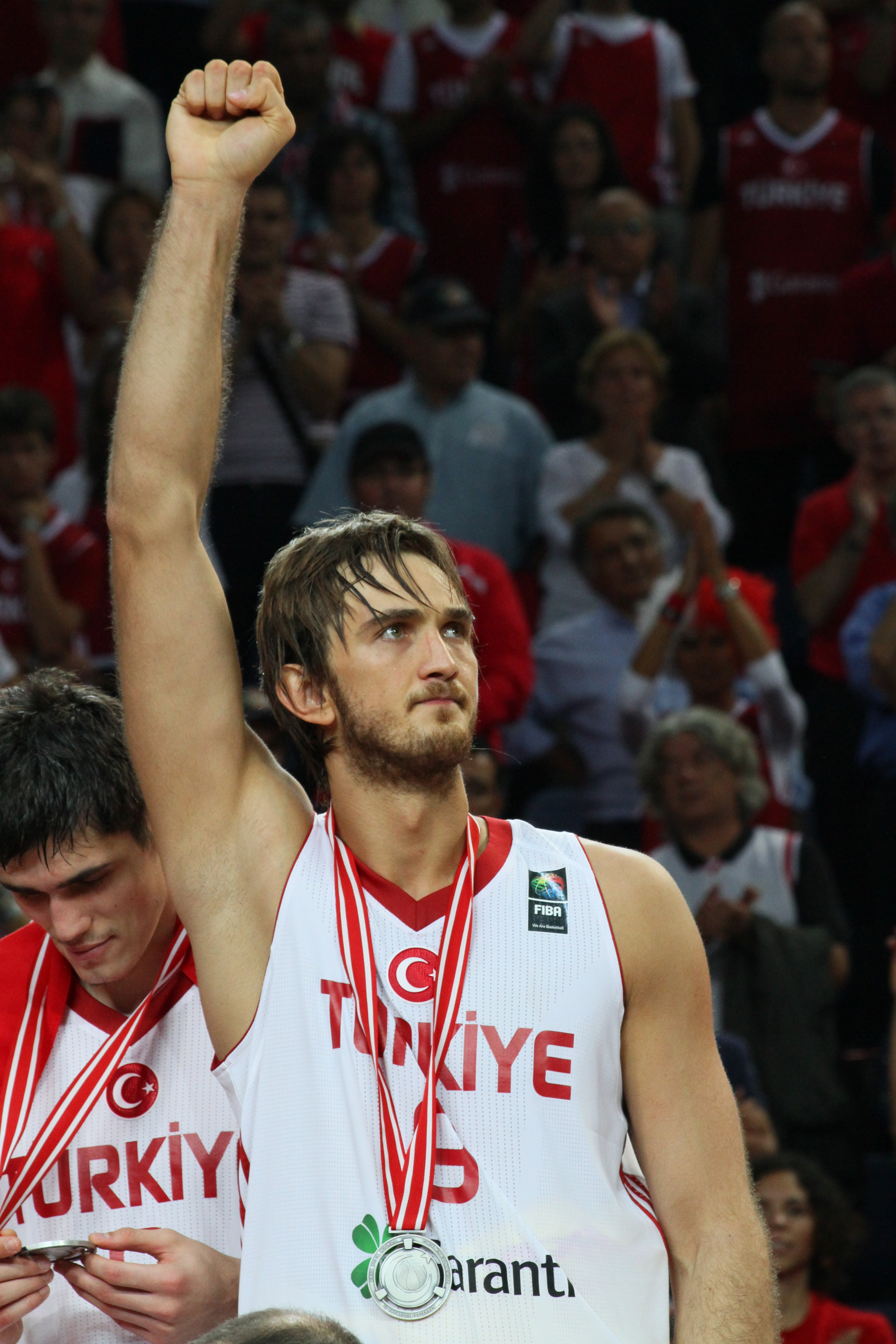
Semih Erden signed with the Boston Celtics.

Draft	Pick	Player	Signed	Team	Former team	Ref.
2007	28	(Brazil) Tiago Splitter	July 12	San Antonio Spurs	Caja Laboral (Spain)	
2008	31	(Montenegro) Nikola Peković	July 28	Minnesota Timberwolves (acquired from Miami via Boston)	Panathinaikos (Greece)	
2008	36	(Turkey) Ömer Aşık	July 13	Chicago Bulls (acquired from Portland)	Fenerbahçe Ülker (Turkey)	
2008	60	(Turkey) Semih Erden	July 5	Boston Celtics	Fenerbahçe Ülker (Turkey)	
2009	30	(Democratic Republic of the Congo) Christian Eyenga	July 23	Cleveland Cavaliers	DKV Joventut (Spain)	
2009	42	(United States) Patrick Beverley	August 2 (waived on October 25)	Miami Heat (acquired from LA Lakers)	Olympiacos (Greece)	

== Undrafted players ==
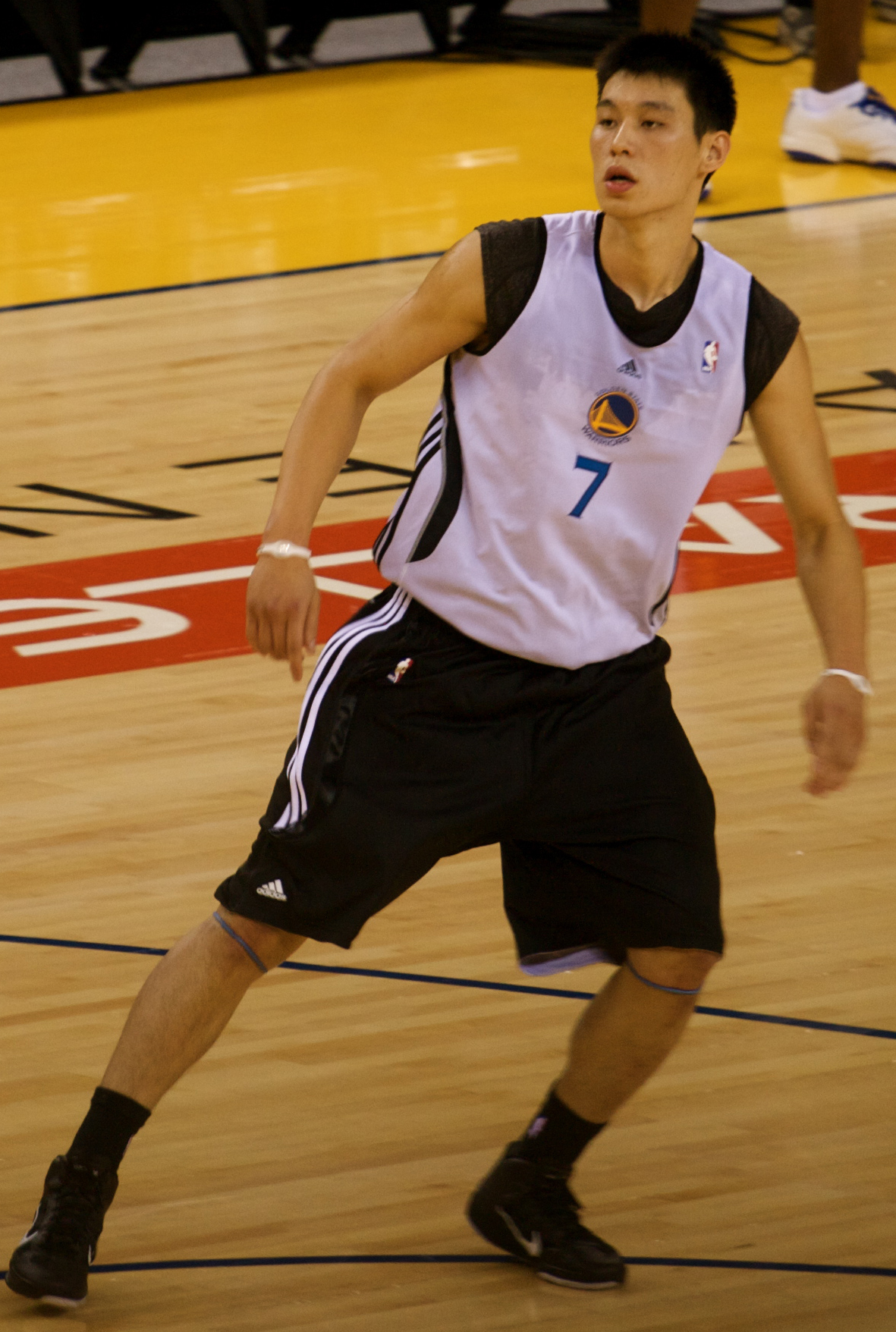
Jeremy Lin was signed by the Golden State Warriors, becoming the first Harvard player to play in the NBA since 1954.

The following players were eligible but went undrafted in the 2010 NBA Draft but were signed with the NBA teams and were named in the opening day roster.

Player	Signed	Team	School/club team	Ref.
(United States) Ben Uzoh	July 1	New Jersey Nets	Tulsa Golden Hurricane (Sr.)	
(United States) Jeremy Lin	July 21	Golden State Warriors	Harvard Crimson (Sr.)	
(United States) Matt Janning	August 4	Phoenix Suns	Northeastern Huskies (Sr.)	
(United States) Sherron Collins	August 6	Charlotte Bobcats	Kansas Jayhawks (Sr.)	
(Jamaica) Samardo Samuels	August 16	Cleveland Cavaliers	Louisville Cardinals (So.)	
(United States) Ishmael Smith	August 23	Houston Rockets	Wake Forest Demon Deacons (Sr.)	
(United States) Manny Harris	September 25	Cleveland Cavaliers	Michigan Wolverines (Jr.)	
