= List of National Basketball League (China) scoring leaders =

The National Basketball League (China) Scoring Leader is an annual basketball award for the season by season individual scoring leaders of the National Basketball League (China) (NBL-China). The NBL China is the 2nd-tier level league of Chinese club basketball. The award was inaugurated during the 2009–10 season. The main criteria for the award is that the player must attain the highest points per game scoring average for the entire season. The present holder of the award is Russ Smith.

== List of NBL China Scoring Champions ==
Season	Player	Team	PPG
2010	(United States) Dante Milligan	Heilongjiang Daqing	30.1
2011	(Nigeria) Ndudi Ebi	Ningxia Hanas	28.3
2012	(United States) Rashaun Freeman	Heilongjiang Daqing	34.7
2013	(United States) Craig Smith	Hong Kong Bulls	30.5
2014	(United States) Tiny Gallon	Henan Shedianlaojiu	38.6
2015	(United States) Tiny Gallon (2×)	Henan Shedianlaojiu	36.2
2016	(United States) Marcus Denmon	Hunan Yongsheng	44.5
2017	(United States) Russ Smith	Luoyang Zhonghe	60.5
2018	(United States) Lamar Patterson	Lhasa Pure Land	45.2
2019	(United States) Russ Smith (2×)	Guizhou White Tigers	43.4
2020	(China) Sun Rongxiao	Wuhan Dangdai	28.8
2021	(China) Wang Siqi	Chongqing Huaxi International	27.6
2022	(China) Yang Wenxue	Shaanxi Xinda	25.5
2023	(United States) Lester Hudson	Liaoning Arctic Wolves	41
2024	(Nigeria) E.J. Anosike	Hefei Kuangfeng	29.9
2025	(United States) Isaiah Briscoe	Jiangxi Ganchi	28.4

== Multiple time winners ==
Total	Player
2	Tiny Gallon
2	Russ Smith
