= Tiny Gallon =

American former professional basketball player

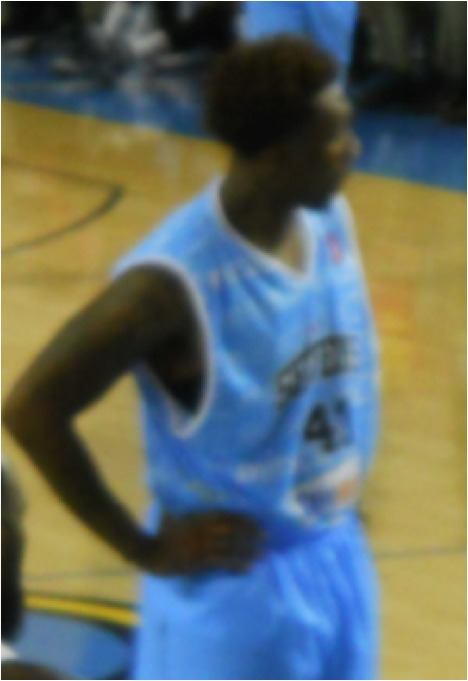
- Gallon with the Delaware 87ers in 2015

Personal information
- Born: January 18, 1991 (age 35) Vallejo, California, U.S.
- Listed height: 6 ft 9 in (2.06 m)
- Listed weight: 275 lb (125 kg)

Career information
- High school: Oak Hill Academy (Mouth of Wilson, Virginia)
- College: Oklahoma (2009–2010)
- NBA draft: 2010: 2nd round, 47th overall pick
- Drafted by: Milwaukee Bucks
- Playing career: 2010–2018
- Position: Power forward / center

Career history
- 2010–2011: Maine Red Claws
- 2011: Bakersfield Jam
- 2013: Atléticos de San Germán
- 2013: Texas Lone Star Strikers
- 2013–2014: Delaware 87ers
- 2014–2015: Henan Shedianlaojiu
- 2014–2015: Delaware 87ers
- 2016: Hebei Xianglan
- 2017–2018: Aomori Wat's

Career highlights
- 2× NBL China scoring champion (2014, 2015); Third-team Parade All-American (2009); McDonald's All-American (2009)
- Stats at Basketball Reference

Keith Lee "Tiny" Gallon (born January 18, 1991) is an American former professional basketball player. He played college basketball for Oklahoma.

== High school career ==
Gallon played in the 2009 McDonald's All-American Game. The 2009 game was held at the BankUnited Center on the University of Miami's Coral Gables campus. The game was played on April 1, 2009, and was nationally televised on ESPN.[2] The All American Boys treated nearly 6,000 fans to one of the best All American Games in recent history. The high scoring, back-and-forth game kept everyone on the edge of their seats. It was not until Morgan Wootten Player of the Year Derrick Favors (Georgia Tech) slammed home an alley oop pass from Lance Stephenson, with just 40 seconds remaining, that the East Team felt in control.

Top contributors to the East victory were John R. Wooden MVP Award winner Derrick Favors, with 19 points and eight rebounds, and Dante Taylor (Pittsburgh), with 15 points and six rebounds. Lance Stephenson added a solid performance that consisted of 12 points, four rebounds, six assists and three steals. Peyton Siva (Louisville) put his name in the record books, as he compiled nine assists.

The West Team used a balanced offensive attack that resulted with six players scoring in double figures. Keith Gallon (Oklahoma) was the top performer for the West Squad in both points (20) and rebounds (7), while Naismith Sportsmanship Award winner Avery Bradley Jr. (Texas) tallied 15 points and six rebounds. John Henson (North Carolina) shot 70% from the field, which led to 14 points.

The East Team came back from an eight-point halftime deficit, due in large part to strong second half shooting (60%) and a 19-point advantage from their bench players. The 113–110 victory increases the East's lead to 18–14 in the overall series.

== College career ==
Gallon was born and raised in Vallejo, California. He played high school basketball at Oak Hill Academy in Mouth of Wilson, Virginia. He played one season for the Oklahoma Sooners in 2009–10.

On December 31, 2009, in a game against the Gonzaga Bulldogs, Gallon shattered the backboard while attempting an alley-oop. While a freshman center for the Sooners, Gallon received a $3,000 wire transfer in August 2009, according to a document obtained by TMZ. The money was deposited in a bank account jointly held by Keith and his mom, Sylvia Wright. The money was sent from Jeffrey Hausinger, a Merrill Lynch financial adviser who reps several professional athletes. As a result, he was deemed "ineligible" by the NCAA. This forced Oklahoma to forfeit the entire 09–10 season.

== Professional career ==
Gallon was selected with the 47th overall pick by the Milwaukee Bucks in the 2010 NBA draft. He joined the Bucks for the 2010 NBA Summer League. On September 3, 2010, he signed with the Bucks. However, he was waived on October 6. On October 19, he signed with the Boston Celtics. However, he was waived on October 21.

On October 30, 2010, Gallon was acquired by the Maine Red Claws. On March 3, 2011, he was traded to the Bakersfield Jam.

In November 2012, Gallon was re-acquired by the Bakersfield Jam. In January 2013, he was waived by the Jam before appearing in a game for them.

In April 2013, Gallon joined Atléticos de San Germán of Puerto Rico. He left after 3 games.

On June 1 and 2 of 2013 he played for the Texas Lone Star Strikers against Portland Chinooks International Basketball League.

On December 30, 2013, Gallon was acquired by the Delaware 87ers. On April 23, 2014, he signed with the Henan Shedianlaojiu for 2014 NBL season.

On November 3, 2014, Gallon was reacquired by the 87ers. He was placed on the inactive list February 12, 2015 due to a season-ending injury and waived. On May 23, 2015, he re-signed with Henan Shedianlaojiu of China for the 2015 NBL season.

On February 8, 2017, Gallon signed with French club Limoges CSP. Seven days later, he left the club after not passing the tryout period.

On August 16, 2017, Gallon signed with the Aomori Wat's of the Japanese B.League for the 2017–18 season.

== Coaching career ==
Gallon signed with Athletes Untapped as a private basketball coach on January 6, 2025.

== Personal life ==
Gallon received his nickname, "Tiny", from his Amateur Athletic Union (AAU) coach who wanted to deceive opponents checking their roster into thinking that Gallon was undersized.
