= Russ Smith (basketball) =

American basketball player (born 1991)

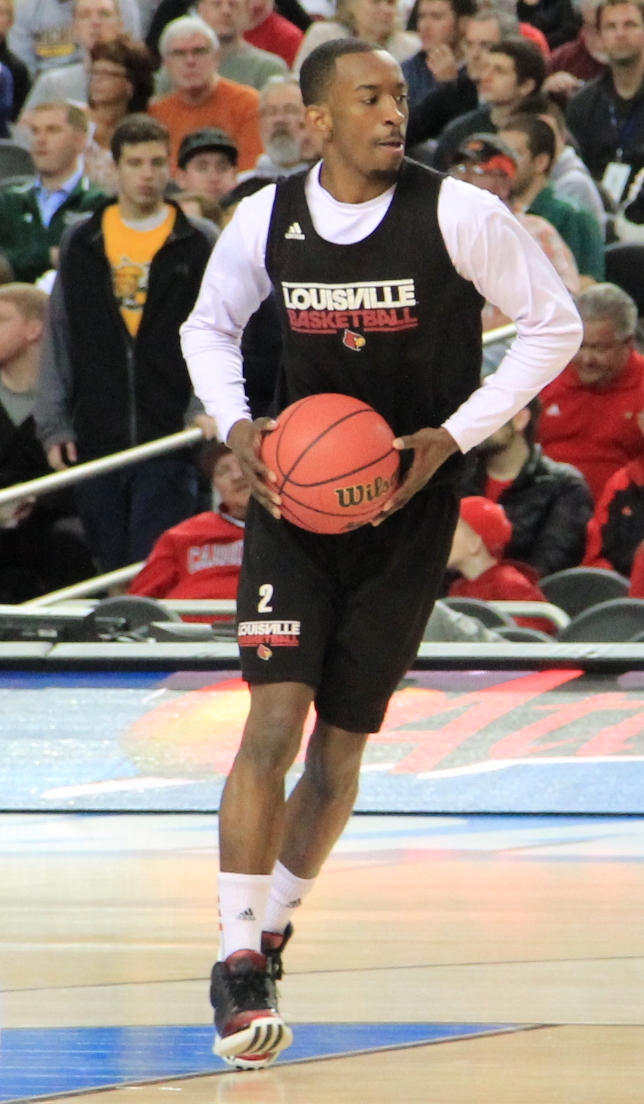
- Smith in 2013

No. 3 – Pallacanestro Nardò
- Position: Point guard
- League: Serie A2

Personal information
- Born: April 19, 1991 (age 35) New York City, New York, U.S.
- Listed height: 6 ft 0 in (1.83 m)
- Listed weight: 166 lb (75 kg)

Career information
- High school: Archbishop Molloy (Queens, New York); South Kent School (South Kent, Connecticut)
- College: Louisville (2010–2014)
- NBA draft: 2014: 2nd round, 47th overall pick
- Drafted by: Philadelphia 76ers
- Playing career: 2014–present

Career history
- 2014–2015: New Orleans Pelicans
- 2014–2015: →Fort Wayne Mad Ants
- 2015: Memphis Grizzlies
- 2015: →Iowa Energy
- 2016: Delaware 87ers
- 2016: Galatasaray Odeabank
- 2017: Delaware 87ers
- 2017: Luoyang Zhonghe
- 2017–2018: Fujian Sturgeons
- 2019: Guizhou White Tigers
- 2020: Cariduros de Fajardo
- 2021: Sichuan Blue Whales
- 2021–2022: Fort Wayne Mad Ants
- 2022: Hapoel Be'er Sheva
- 2022–2024: Pallacanestro Nardò
- 2024–2025: Tabiat Eslamshahr
- 2025–present: Pallacanestro Nardò

Career highlights
- NBL (China) Player of the Year (2017); NBL (China) Guard of the Year (2017); NBL (China) Import of the Year (2017); 2× NBL (China) scoring champion (2017, 2019); NCAA champion (2013)*; Consensus first-team All-American (2014); Third-team All-American - SN, NABC (2013); First-team All-AAC (2014); First-team All-Big East (2013); Frances Pomeroy Naismith Award (2014); AAC tournament MVP (2014); No. 2 retired by Louisville Cardinals; Jordan Brand Classic (2009); *Later vacated
- Stats at NBA.com
- Stats at Basketball Reference

Russ Antoin Smith (born April 19, 1991) is an American professional basketball player for Pallacanestro Nardò of Serie A2 in Italy. He played college basketball for the Louisville Cardinals, playing a starring role as a junior in helping them win the 2013 NCAA championship, while earning third-team All-American by the NABC and the Sporting News. As a senior at Louisville, he was named a consensus first-team All-American. As of March 5, 2023, his 65-point performance remains the NBA G League single game scoring record.

== High school career ==
Smith was born in New York City at NY Presbyterian Hospital to Paulette A. O'Neal and Russell Smith. He went to Archbishop Molloy High School in Queens, N.Y. and played basketball for head coach Jack Curran. He led the New York City Catholic league (CHSAA) in scoring as a junior averaging 24.5 points a game and as a senior averaging 29.6 points, he also had a 7.3 rebound and 3.2 assist average his final season for the Molloy Stanners. His career high in points was 47, which he reached twice as a senior against St. Francis Prep and Christ the King. Smith was named to the 2009 New York State Sportswriters Association all-state team, made the first-team all-CHSAA "AA", and New York Daily News All-Queens first team as a senior. He played in the 2009 Jordan Brand Classic Regional Game at Madision Square Garden on April 18. Where he scored 27 points and earned co-MVP honors as his City team beat the Suburban team 129–120. Russ played prep school basketball at South Kent School in 2010 averaging 19.7 points and 3.9 assists a game as South Kent went 20–12 on the season.

College recruiting
Name	Hometown	School	Height	Weight	Commit date
Russ Smith; G	Brooklyn, NY	Archbishop Molloy High School, NY; South Kent School, CT	6 ft 0 in (1.83 m)	165 lb (75 kg)	Nov 15, 2009
Russ Smith; G	Recruit ratings: Scout: Rivals: (88)				

== College career ==
=== Recruitment ===
Louisville overlooked Smith at first. Assistant coaches Ralph Willard and Steve Masiello were on a recruiting trip in South Kent in September 2009, looking at another player. They saw Smith, who they thought would be perfect for their system. Masiello had also known Smith's father since he was 15. Louisville started looking at Smith seriously, and Smith liked Louisville so much that he tried to commit before he had a scholarship offer.

=== Freshman year ===
Upon coming to school, Smith chose uniform #2. Injuries limited Smith's playing time as a freshman. He had a broken foot, concussion, strained foot, and sore knee during the season and only saw action in 17 games. Smith was so miserable with the injuries and lack of playing time he decided to leave Louisville and go back home. But that day against West Virginia, coach Pitino put him in and told him to play hard. He had 3 points, 2 rebounds, one steal, and played good defense in his nine minutes of action. Helping spark the Cardinals' comeback from down 11 to win by 1, when Peyton Siva hit a layup at the buzzer. After that, he decided to stay. The Cardinals reached the championship game of the 2011 Big East men's basketball tournament but lost to Connecticut. Louisville finished the season 25–10, 12–6 in the 2010–11 Big East season tied for 3rd in the conference. They received an at-large bid and a #4 seed in the 2011 NCAA tournament where they were upset in the second round by #13 seeded Morehead State 61–62.

=== Sophomore year ===
During his sophomore year in 2011–12, Smith provided a spark off the bench. He was second in scoring despite being sixth in mins played for the Cardinals. In January 2012 he earned the nickname "Russdiculous" given to him by head coach Rick Pitino, who has named a race horse "Russdiculous" also. Smith set a school record for steals in a season with 87 steals in his 39 games played. Louisville won four games in four nights to win the 2012 Big East tournament championship. The Cardinals advanced to the Final Four of the 2012 NCAA tournament, upsetting #1 seed Michigan State 57–44 in the sweet sixteen and defeating #7 seed Florida in the regional final, where Smith led Louisville with 19 points in the game. Before losing in the national semifinals to arch-rival and eventual national champion Kentucky. Smith averaged 11.5 points, 2.5 rebounds, 1.9 assists, and 2.2 steals a game for the Cardinals, who finished the season with a 30–10 record.

=== Junior year ===
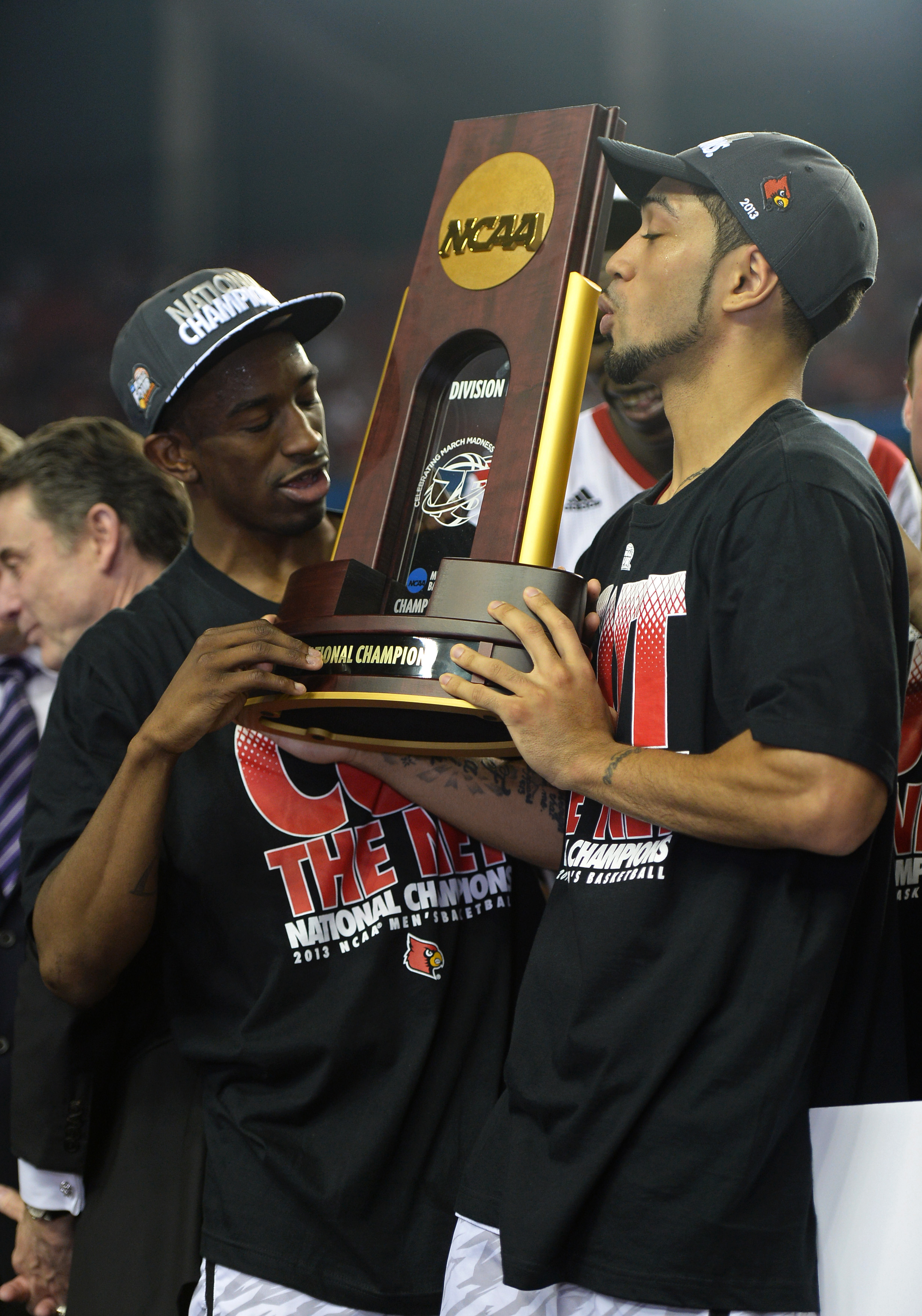
Smith (left) and Peyton Siva (right) with the 2013 NCAA Men's Division I Basketball Tournament trophy.

Before the start of the 2012–13 basketball season the Louisville Cardinals men's basketball team was picked to finish 1st in the Big East Conference in polls done by Big East writers and coaches. Louisville finished the regular season with a 26–5 record and 14–4 in the Big East to tie for a share of the Big East regular season championship with Georgetown and Marquette, who also finished with a 14–4 conference record. Smith learned about the death of his high school coach Jack Curran before the start of the 2013 Big East tournament. Louisville played Villanova in their first game of the tournament, Smith scored 28 points and said "Today was definitely Coach Curran Day for me, and it will be the rest of my life" in postgame interview that aired live on ESPN. Russ was named to the Big East All-Tournament Team and his team won the Big East tournament Championship game versus Syracuse by a score of 78–61 after trailing by 13 at halftime.

Louisville, with a 29–5 record, was selected the #1 overall seed for the 2013 NCAA tournament. In his first two games of the NCAA tournament at Rupp Arena he had 23 points versus North Carolina A&T and had 27 against Colorado State. Louisville fans liked what Smith was doing on the floor so much they started chanting RussArena near the end of the Colorado State game and made a Twitter hashtag #RussArena. He tied his career high of 31 points and the Cardinals beat the Oregon Ducks 77–69 in the Sweet Sixteen. In Louisville's 85–63 regional final win against Duke, Smith recorded 23 points and was subsequently named the Most Outstanding Player of the tournament's Midwest Region. During the Duke game Smith witnessed Kevin Ware suffer a horrible broken leg accident that left the team very emotional. Ware said "Just go win this game for me. Just go win this game. Don't worry about me, I'm fine." while being attended to by medical staff who was preparing him for a trip to the hospital. Louisville outscored Duke 64 to 43 after the Ware injury and credited Ware's positive attitude about his injury for their win. In Louisville's next game Smith had 21 points in a 72–68 win over Wichita State in the Final Four. Smith averaged 18.7 points, 3.3 rebounds, 2.9 assists and 2.1 steals this season for the Cardinals who won the national championship over Michigan with a 35–5 record. The championship was later taken away for recruits receiving impermissible benefits.

=== Senior year ===
On April 24, 2013, Smith announced he would stay at Louisville for his senior year in an attempt to improve his draft stock the upcoming year. On February 28, he was named one of the 10 semi-finalists for Naismith College Player of the Year.

Louisville finished the season with a 31–6 record, earning a 4 seed in the tournament. Louisville opened against Manhattan in the second round, Smith led the game in scoring with 18 points. After Manhattan, Louisville advanced 66–51 against Saint Louis. Smith tallied up 11 points and tied for the most assists with 7. Smith ended his college career with 23 points in the Sweet Sixteen, losing against Kentucky.

Smith was selected on the Associated Press First Team All American list. On January 22, 2022, his No. 2 jersey was retired by the Cardinals.

=== College honors ===
- 2013 NCAA Midwest Regional Most Outstanding Player
- 2013 Big East All-Tournament Team
- 2013 Big East All-Conference First Team
- 2013 Lute Olson All-America Team
- 2013 Sporting News All-American Third Team
- 2013 NABC All-America Third Team
- 2013 College Sports Madness All-America First Team
- 2014 John Wooden Award All-American team

== Professional career ==
=== New Orleans Pelicans (2014–2015) ===
On June 26, 2014, Smith was selected with the 47th overall pick in the 2014 NBA draft by the Philadelphia 76ers. The next day, his rights were traded to the New Orleans Pelicans in exchange for the rights to Pierre Jackson. Following the draft, Smith noted his frustration in some draft analysts questioning his efficiency. He was frustrated by teams waffling over his ability to play point guard at the NBA level, and was frustrated that several unnamed big-time NBA draft prospects avoided workouts with him in the two-month build-up to the draft. He later signed his rookie scale contract with the Pelicans on July 15. During his rookie season with the Pelicans, he had multiple assignments with the Fort Wayne Mad Ants of the NBA Development League.

=== Memphis Grizzlies (2015) ===
On January 12, 2015, Smith was traded to the Memphis Grizzlies in a three-team deal involving the Pelicans and the Boston Celtics. He was assigned multiple times to the Iowa Energy in his rookie season. Smith made his playoff debut on May 3, 2015, in a 101–86 loss to the Golden State Warriors in the Western Conference semi-finals.

On December 17, 2015, Smith was reassigned to the Iowa Energy, but was recalled later that day. He was reassigned again on December 22, and recalled two days later. On December 29, he was waived by the Grizzlies.

=== Delaware 87ers (2016) ===
On January 13, 2016, Smith was acquired by the Delaware 87ers of the NBA Development League. Two days later, he made his debut for the 87ers in a 119–104 win over Raptors 905, scoring a team-high 37 points in 28 minutes of action off the bench. On February 1, 2016, he was named NBA D-League Performer of the Week for games played Monday, January 25 through Sunday, January 31. The honor was the first of Smith's career. He helped Delaware to a 2–1 week, averaging 28.7 points (fifth in the league) on 48 percent shooting (28-for-58) to go with a league-leading 8.7 assists, 4.3 rebounds and 2.0 steals. On March 18, he recorded his first career triple-double after recording 20 points, 13 rebounds and 16 assists in a 116–98 win over the Fort Wayne Mad Ants. On March 23, he set a D-League scoring record with 65 points on 24-of-42 shooting from the field in a 140–129 loss to the Canton Charge. As of March 3, 2022, the record still stood as did his record of 105 points in consecutive games. On March 29, he was waived by the 87ers after being deemed to have a season-ending injury.

=== Europe (2016) ===
On July 27, 2016, Smith signed a one-year contract with Galatasaray Odeabank of the Turkish BSL and EuroLeague. In December 2016, he parted ways with Galatasaray.

=== Return to the Delaware 87ers (2017) ===
On January 20, 2017, Smith was re-acquired by the Delaware 87ers.

=== China (2017–2021) ===
On June 3, 2017, Smith signed with Luoyang Zhonghe of China for the 2017 NBL season. In his debut with Luoyang, Smith scored 62 points (including seven 3-pointers made) and recorded three steals in a 138–123 loss to the Anhui Lightning. On July 5, 2017, Smith scored a career-high 81 points to go along with eight rebounds and seven assists in a 142–130 win over the Henan Golden Elephants. Russ Smith averaged 61.2 points per game that season & applied for a world record.

After that summer league's campaign wrapped up, he signed with the Fujian Sturgeons for the 2017-18 CBA season.

=== Fort Wayne Mad Ants (2021–2022) ===
On December 30, 2021, Smith was acquired and activated by the Fort Wayne Mad Ants of the NBA G League. On January 7, 2022, in his first game in the G League since 2017, Smith scored 43 points in a 94–103 loss to the Raptors 905. On January 31, he suffered a season-ending shoulder injury. Smith averaged 16.4 points, 1.7 rebounds and 1.4 assists per game.

=== Hapoel Be'er Sheva (2022) ===
On September 2, 2022, he signed with Hapoel Be'er Sheva of the Israeli Basketball Premier League.

=== Tabiat Eslamshahr (2024–2025) ===
On November 18, 2024, Smith signed with Tabiat Eslamshahr of Iranian Basketball Super League.

=== Pallacanestro Nardò (2025–present) ===
On February 6, 2025, Smith signed with Pallacanestro Nardò of Serie A2 in Italy.

== The Basketball Tournament ==
Smith joined other Louisville basketball alumni for the 2023 and 2024 The Basketball Tournament aka TBT. He led The Ville team in scoring for the '23 season, losing in the regional championship. He led the team in scoring again for the '24 season, and lost to the Kentucky basketball alumni's team La Familia in the quarterfinals'.

== Career statistics ==
Legend
GP	Games played	GS	Games started	MPG	Minutes per game
FG%	Field goal percentage	3P%	3-point field goal percentage	FT%	Free throw percentage
RPG	Rebounds per game	APG	Assists per game	SPG	Steals per game
BPG	Blocks per game	PPG	Points per game	**Bold**	Career high

=== NBA ===
==== Regular season ====
Year	Team	GP	GS	MPG	FG%	3P%	FT%	RPG	APG	SPG	BPG	PPG
2014–15	New Orleans	6	0	4.8	.200	.167	—	.5	.3	.0	.0	.8
2014–15	Memphis	6	0	6.0	.400	.200	.923	.5	1.0	.5	.0	4.2
2015–16	Memphis	15	0	4.4	.318	.200	.615	.6	.7	.3	.1	1.5
Career		5	0	5.4	.250	.000	1.000	.2	.2	.2	.0	1.2

==== Playoffs ====
Year	Team	GP	GS	MPG	FG%	3P%	FT%	RPG	APG	SPG	BPG	PPG
2015	Memphis	2	0	1.5	—	—	—	.0	1.0	.0	.0	.8
Career		2	0	1.5	—	—	—	.0	1.0	.0	.0	.8
