= Rashaun Freeman =

American professional basketball player

Personal information
- Born: December 15, 1984 (age 41) Schenectady, New York, U.S.
- Listed height: 6 ft 9 in (2.06 m)
- Listed weight: 255.2 lb (116 kg)

Career information
- High school: Schenectady (Schenectady, New York)
- College: UMass (2003–2007)
- NBA draft: 2007: undrafted
- Playing career: 2007–2018
- Position: Power forward / center

Career history
- 2007–2008: Nantes
- 2008–2009: BCM Gravelines
- 2009–2010: EnBW Ludwigsburg
- 2010: Albany Legends
- 2010–2011: RBC Verviers-Pepinster
- 2011: Gallitos de Isabela
- 2011–2012: Habik'a
- 2012: Heilongjiang
- 2012: JSF Nanterre
- 2013: HKK Široki
- 2013–2014: Barak Netanya
- 2014–2015: Tsmoki-Minsk
- 2015: Boca Juniors
- 2016: Hebraica y Macabi
- 2016–2017: Hispano Americano
- 2017: Maccabi Haifa
- 2017: Club Olimpia
- 2017–2018: Hebraica y Macabi
- 2018: Club Olimpia

Career highlights
- Uruguayan League champion (2016); NBL China scoring champion (2012); French 2nd Division Foreign Player's MVP (2008); LNB Pro B Best Scorer (2008); 3× First-team All-Atlantic 10 (2005–2007)

Rashaun Demier Freeman (born December 15, 1984) is an American professional basketball player. He played college basketball at the University of Massachusetts. He was a prospect for the 2007 NBA draft. He received a tryout for the Memphis Grizzlies.

== College basketball ==
Freeman finished 4th in career points for the Minutemen with 1,744 and third in career rebounds with 998. He was on the Atlantic 10 First Team for three years in a row. He scored a career high 31 points vs St. Bonaventure. Throughout his UMass career he averaged 14.8 points and 8.5 rebounds. He was a Senior team tri-captain with Stéphane Lasme and Brandon Thomas.

== Professional career ==
Freeman's professional career began at Hermine de Nantes Atlantique in the French Pro B (2nd Division), before being signed by the French Pro A (1st Division) club BCM Gravelines for the following season. In the 2009–10 season, he played for EnBW Ludwigsburg in the German Bundesliga. Freeman then moved to Belgium, signed by VOO Verviers-Pepinster, and had a short stint in Puerto Rico, where he played for Gallitos de Isabela. For the 2011–12 season, he was signed by Israeli club Maccabi Habik'a.

In July 2013, Freeman signed with Barak Netanya.

In August 2014, he signed with BC Tsmoki-Minsk.

On April 24, 2017, Freeman signed with Maccabi Haifa.
