= Henan Golden Elephants =

- League: National Basketball League
- Founded: February 2006; 20 years ago
- Arena: Nanyang Stadium
- Location: Nanyang, Henan, China
- Affiliation: Shedian Laojiu

The Henan Golden Elephants are a Chinese professional men's basketball club based in Nanyang, Henan, playing in the National Basketball League (NBL). It is also known by the name of its sponsor, Shedian Laojiu (literally, Shedian Old Liquor), a liquor company based in Shedian, Sheqi County, Nanyang, Henan.

== Current players ==
2019 Henan Roaring Elephants roster
Players
Coaches

| Pos. | No. | Nat. | Name | Ht. | Wt. |
|---|---|---|---|---|---|
| F | 7 | (China) | Bo Jiang | 1.92 m (6 ft 4 in) | 85 kg (187 lb) |
| F | 8 | (China) | Cui Xiaolong | 1.92 m (6 ft 4 in) | 84 kg (185 lb) |
| F | 9 | (China) | Jiang Yuxing | 1.93 m (6 ft 4 in) | 90 kg (198 lb) |
| F | 10 | (China) | Jia Hao | 1.98 m (6 ft 6 in) | 84 kg (185 lb) |
| F | 11 | (China) | Wang Longfei | 1.90 m (6 ft 3 in) | 88 kg (194 lb) |
| F | 12 | (China) | Lu Junhu | 2.05 m (6 ft 9 in) | 95 kg (209 lb) |
| F | 13 | (China) | Li Pengpeng | 2.02 m (6 ft 8 in) | 93 kg (205 lb) |
| C | 14 | (China) | Lian Bo | 2.06 m (6 ft 9 in) | 105 kg (231 lb) |
| C | 15 | (China) | Ma Xiaochao | 2.06 m (6 ft 9 in) | 110 kg (243 lb) |
| F | 18 | (China) | Zhang Ge | 2.02 m (6 ft 8 in) | 90 kg (198 lb) |
| C | 21 | (China) | Li Xiaohu | 2.03 m (6 ft 8 in) | 88 kg (194 lb) |

Head coach

- (China) Li Jianxin

Legend

- (C) Team captain
- Injured
