= 2014–15 Brooklyn Nets season =

Season of National Basketball Association team the Brooklyn Nets

- Head coach: Lionel Hollins
- General manager: Billy King
- Owners: Mikhail Prokhorov
- Arena: Barclays Center

Results
- Record: 38–44 (.463)
- Place: Division: 3rd (Atlantic); Conference: 8th (Eastern)
- Playoff finish: First round (lost to Hawks 2–4)
- Stats at Basketball Reference

Local media
- Television: YES Network, WWOR
- Radio: WFAN

The 2014–15 Brooklyn Nets season was the franchise's 48th season, its 39th season in the National Basketball Association (NBA), and its third season playing in the New York City borough of Brooklyn. The city of New York City, New York hosted the 2015 NBA All-Star weekend, with the Nets' home arena Barclays Center used as the venue for the Friday and Saturday events. The Nets finished the regular season with a 38–44 record, securing the eighth seed. In the playoffs, they met the top-seeded Atlanta Hawks in the First Round, losing in six games.

The Nets would not make another playoff appearance until the 2018–19 season.

== Preseason ==
=== NBA draft ===
Round	Pick	Pick traded to
1	17	Boston Celtics (Note: On July 12, 2013, the team traded their first-round draft pick to the Celtics.)
2	47	Boston Celtics (Note: On June 23, 2011, their second-round draft pick was traded to the Boston Celtics.)

Round	Pick	Pick traded from
2	44	Minnesota Timberwolves
2	59	Toronto Raptors
2	60	San Antonio Spurs

=== Pre-season trades ===
On July 1, head coach Jason Kidd, was traded to the Milwaukee Bucks for two second-round draft picks in 2015 and 2019. To replace Kidd, the Nets signed Lionel Hollins as head coach. On July 10, the Nets traded Marcus Thornton to the Boston Celtics and the draft rights to Edin Bavčić and İlkan Karaman to the Cleveland Cavaliers, for Jarrett Jack and Sergey Karasev.

== Regular season ==
=== Standings ===
Atlantic Division	W	L	PCT	GB	Home	Road	Div	GP
y-Toronto Raptors	49	33	.598	–	27‍–‍14	22‍–‍19	11–5	82
x-Boston Celtics	40	42	.488	9.0	21‍–‍20	19‍–‍22	12–4	82
x-Brooklyn Nets	38	44	.463	11.0	19‍–‍22	19‍–‍22	10–6	82
Philadelphia 76ers	18	64	.220	31.0	12‍–‍29	6‍–‍35	2–14	82
New York Knicks	17	65	.207	32.0	10‍–‍31	7‍–‍34	5–11	82

Eastern Conference
#	Team	W	L	PCT	GB	GP
1	c-Atlanta Hawks *	60	22	.732	–	82
2	y-Cleveland Cavaliers *	53	29	.646	7.0	82
3	x-Chicago Bulls	50	32	.610	10.0	82
4	y-Toronto Raptors *	49	33	.598	11.0	82
5	x-Washington Wizards	46	36	.561	14.0	82
6	x-Milwaukee Bucks	41	41	.500	19.0	82
7	x-Boston Celtics	40	42	.488	20.0	82
8	x-Brooklyn Nets	38	44	.463	22.0	82
9	Indiana Pacers	38	44	.463	22.0	82
10	Miami Heat	37	45	.451	23.0	82
11	Charlotte Hornets	33	49	.402	27.0	82
12	Detroit Pistons	32	50	.390	28.0	82
13	Orlando Magic	25	57	.305	35.0	82
14	Philadelphia 76ers	18	64	.220	42.0	82
15	New York Knicks	17	65	.207	43.0	82

== Game log ==
=== Preseason ===
2014 pre-season game log
Total: 4–2 (home: 3–1; road: 1–1)
Pre-season: 4–2 (home: 3–1; road: 1–1)

Game	Date	Team	Score	High points	High rebounds	High assists	Location Attendance	Record
1	October 7	Maccabi Tel Aviv	W 111–94	Brook Lopez (20)	Mirza Teletović (8)	Deron Williams (7)	Barclays Center (15,915)	1–0
2	October 12	@ Sacramento	W 97–95	Brook Lopez (18)	Andrei Kirilenko (9)	Deron Williams (6)	Mercedes-Benz Arena (17,381)	2–0
3	October 15	Sacramento	W 129–117 (OT)	Mirza Teletović (22)	Brook Lopez (6)	Joe Johnson (8)	MasterCard Center (17,130)	3–0
4	October 19	Boston	L 90–95	Jarrett Jack (17)	Mirza Teletović (6)	Deron Williams (4)	Barclays Center (13,787)	3–1
5	October 20	Philadelphia	W 99–88	Mason Plumlee (20)	Mason Plumlee (17)	Jarrett Jack (8)	Barclays Center (12,271)	4–1
6	October 22	@ Boston	L 86–100	Mason Plumlee (15)	Mason Plumlee (11)	Jorge Gutiérrez (5)	TD Garden (15,508)	4–2

2014–15 pre-season schedule

=== Regular season ===
2014–15 game log
Total: 38–44 (home: 19–22; road: 19–22)
October: 0–1 (home: 0–0; road: 0–1)

Game	Date	Team	Score	High points	High rebounds	High assists	Location Attendance	Record
1	October 29	@ Boston	L 105–121	Mirza Teletović (20)	Joe Johnson (6)	Deron Williams (8)	TD Garden; 18,624	0–1

November : 6–8 (home: 3–4; road: 3–4)

Game	Date	Team	Score	High points	High rebounds	High assists	Location Attendance	Record
2	November 1	@ Detroit	W 102–90	Joe Johnson (34)	Kevin Garnett (14)	Joe Johnson (6)	The Palace of Auburn Hills; 19,904	1–1
3	November 3	Oklahoma City	W 116–85	Brook Lopez (18)	Mason Plumlee (8)	Deron Williams (9)	Barclays Center; 17,732	2–1
4	November 5	Minnesota	L 91–98	Joe Johnson (22)	Kevin Garnett (11)	Deron Williams (6)	Barclays Center; 16,302	2–2
5	November 7	New York	W 110–99	Deron Williams (29)	Brook Lopez (9)	Deron Williams (6)	Barclays Center; 17,732	3–2
6	November 9	Orlando	W 104–96	Bojan Bogdanovic (22)	Mason Plumlee (10)	Williams & Garnett (7)	Barclays Center; 16,127	4–2
7	November 12	@ Phoenix	L 104–112	Joe Johnson (21)	Kevin Garnett (10)	Deron Williams (5)	US Airways Center; 15,184	4–3
8	November 13	@ Golden State	L 99–107	Jarrett Jack (23)	Mason Plumlee (8)	Deron Williams (5)	Oracle Arena; 19,596	4–4
9	November 15	@ Portland	L 87–97	Brook Lopez (21)	Kevin Garnett (12)	Deron Williams (6)	Moda Center; 19,441	4–5
10	November 17	Miami	L 83–95	Bojan Bogdanovic (22)	Kevin Garnett (9)	Deron Williams (7)	Barclays Center; 17,732	4–6
11	November 19	Milwaukee	L 118–122 (3OT)	Brook Lopez (26)	Kevin Garnett (9)	Joe Johnson (8)	Barclays Center; 15,694	4–7
12	November 21	@ Oklahoma City	W 94–92	Jarrett Jack (23)	Brook Lopez (10)	Jarrett Jack (5)	Chesapeake Energy Arena; 18,203	5–7
13	November 22	@ San Antonio	L 87–99	Deron Williams (24)	Mirza Teletović (8)	Deron Williams (7)	AT&T Center; 18,581	5–8
14	November 26	@ Philadelphia	W 99–91	Joe Johnson (21)	Kevin Garnett (9)	Deron Williams (10)	Wells Fargo Center; 11,223	6–8
15	November 30	Chicago	L 84–102	Bojan Bogdanovic (13)	Kevin Garnett (7)	Jarrett Jack (4)	Barclays Center; 17,732	6–9

December : 9–7 (home: 5–4; road: 4–3)

Game	Date	Team	Score	High points	High rebounds	High assists	Location Attendance	Record
16	December 2	@ New York	W 98–93	Brook Lopez (23)	Kevin Garnett (13)	Joe Johnson (6)	Madison Square Garden; 19,812	7–9
17	December 3	San Antonio	W 95–93	Mirza Teletović (26)	Brook Lopez (16)	Deron Williams (9)	Barclays Center; 15,989	8–9
18	December 5	Atlanta	L 75–98	Brook Lopez (20)	Lopez, Plumlee (7)	Joe Johnson (4)	Barclays Center; 16,146	8–10
19	December 8	Cleveland	L 88–110	Kevin Garnett (14)	Kevin Garnett (7)	Deron Williams (11)	Barclays Center; 17,732	8–11
20	December 10	@ Chicago	L 80–105	Deron Williams (17)	Mason Plumlee (8)	Deron Williams (5)	United Center; 21,646	8–12
21	December 12	Philadelphia	W 88–70	Mason Plumlee (18)	Kevin Garnett (12)	Deron Williams (10)	Barclays Center; 16,326	9–12
22	December 13	@ Charlotte	W 114–87	Joe Johnson (22)	Mason Plumlee (13)	Deron Williams (10)	Time Warner Cable Arena; 17,113	10–12
23	December 16	Miami	L 91–95	Mason Plumlee (21)	Kevin Garnett (10)	Deron Williams (11)	Barclays Center; 16,827	10–13
24	December 17	@ Toronto	L 89–105	Mason Plumlee (23)	Plumlee, Johnson (8)	Deron Williams (7)	Air Canada Centre; 19,800	10–14
25	December 19	@ Cleveland	L 91–95	Joe Johnson (26)	Mason Plumlee (9)	Johnson, Williams (4)	Quicken Loans Arena; 20,562	10–15
26	December 21	Detroit	W 110–105	Mason Plumlee (21)	Mason Plumlee (12)	Jarrett Jack (10)	Barclays Center; 17,732	11–15
27	December 23	Denver	W 102–96	Joe Johnson (27)	Mason Plumlee (13)	Jarrett Jack (8)	Barclays Center; 17,080	12–15
28	December 26	@ Boston	W 109–107	Jarrett Jack (27)	Mason Plumlee (12)	Jarrett Jack (5)	TD Garden; 18,624	13–15
29	December 27	Indiana	L 85–110	Jarrett Jack (22)	Mason Plumlee (8)	Joe Johnson (6)	Barclays Center; 17,732	13–16
30	December 29	Sacramento	W 107–99	Mason Plumlee (22)	Kevin Garnett (8)	Joe Johnson (6)	Barclays Center; 17,732	14–16
31	December 30	@ Chicago	W 96–82	Brook Lopez (29)	Joe Johnson (11)	Jarrett Jack (5)	United Center; 22,032	15–16

January: 3–12 (home: 0–7; road: 3–5)

Game	Date	Team	Score	High points	High rebounds	High assists	Location Attendance	Record
32	January 2	@ Orlando	W 100–98	Mason Plumlee (18)	Mason Plumlee (9)	Deron Williams (7)	Amway Center; 17,008	16–16
33	January 4	@ Miami	L 84–88	Joe Johnson (19)	Lopez, Garnett (29)	Deron Williams (8)	American Airlines Arena; 20,181	16–17
34	January 5	Dallas	L 88–96 (OT)	Brook Lopez (22)	Brook Lopez (13)	Jarrett Jack (10)	Barclays Center; 17,732	16–18
35	January 7	Boston	L 81–89	Joe Johnson (17)	Mason Plumlee (12)	Jarrett Jack (4)	Barclays Center; 17,732	16–19
36	January 9	Philadelphia	L 88–90	Brook Lopez (18)	Mason Plumlee (15)	Jarrett Jack (10)	Barclays Center; 16,172	16–20
37	January 10	@ Detroit	L 93–98	Joe Johnson (17)	Brook Lopez (15)	Jarrett Jack (8)	The Palace of Auburn Hills; 19,301	16–21
38	January 12	Houston	L 99–113	Mason Plumlee (24)	Mason Plumlee (10)	Jarrett Jack (6)	Barclays Center; 16,115	16–22
39	January 14	Memphis	L 92–103	Mason Plumlee (15)	Mason Plumlee (9)	Jarrett Jack (6)	Barclays Center; 16,516	16–23
40	January 16	@ Washington	W 102–80	Lopez, Jack (26)	Mason Plumlee (10)	Jarrett Jack (7)	Verizon Center; 17,788	17–23
41	January 17	Washington	L 90–99	Jarrett Jack (22)	Kevin Garnett (10)	Jarrett Jack (8)	Barclays Center; 17,732	17–24
42	January 21	@ Sacramento	W 103–100	Brook Lopez (22)	Joe Johnson (8)	Jarrett Jack (8)	Sleep Train Arena; 16,427	18–24
43	January 22	@ L.A. Clippers	L 84–123	Mason Plumlee (16)	Jerome Jordan (11)	Darius Morris (4)	Staples Center; 19,060	18–25
44	January 24	@ Utah	L 73–108	Jarrett Jack (16)	Mason Plumlee (6)	Jarrett Jack (8)	EnergySolutions Arena; 19,352	18–26
45	January 28	@ Atlanta	L 102–113	Joe Johnson (26)	Lopez, Plumlee (7)	Jarrett Jack (13)	Philips Arena; 18,047	18–27
46	January 30	Toronto	L 122–127 (OT)	Lopez, Jack (35)	Brook Lopez (12)	Jarrett Jack (13)	Barclays Center; 17,062	18–28

February : 6–5 (home: 2–0; road: 4–5)

Game	Date	Team	Score	High points	High rebounds	High assists	Location Attendance	Record
47	February 2	L.A. Clippers	W 102–100	Brook Lopez (24)	Kevin Garnett (11)	Jarrett Jack (7)	Barclays Center; 16,037	19–28
48	February 4	@ Toronto	W 109–93	Jarrett Jack (24)	Mason Plumlee (7)	Joe Johnson (7)	Air Canada Centre; 19,800	20–28
49	February 6	New York	W 92–88	Brook Lopez (22)	Joe Johnson (11)	Jarrett Jack (8)	Barclays Center; 17,732	21–28
50	February 7	@ Washington	L 77–114	Brook Lopez (19)	Brook Lopez (8)	Deron Williams (7)	Verizon Center; 17,732	21–29
51	February 9	@ Milwaukee	L 97–103	Jarrett Jack (26)	Mason Plumlee (7)	Jarrett Jack (8)	BMO Harris Bradley Center; 12,431	21–30
52	February 10	@ Memphis	L 86–95	Plumlee, Anderson (15)	Mason Plumlee (14)	Williams, Johnson (4)	FedExForum; 12,431	21–31
All-Star Break
53	February 20	@ L.A. Lakers	W 114–105	Joe Johnson (23)	Brook Lopez (14)	Deron Williams (15)	Staples Center; 18,997	22–31
54	February 23	@ Denver	W 110–82	Brook Lopez (19)	Markel Brown (11)	Deron Williams (11)	Pepsi Center; 13,127	23–31
55	February 25	@ New Orleans	L 96–102	Joe Johnson (21)	Joe Johnson (10)	Deron Williams (6)	Smoothie King Center; 16,097	23–32
56	February 27	@ Houston	L 98–102	Plumlee, Williams (15)	Brook Lopez (12)	Joe Johnson (6)	Toyota Center; 18,139	23–33
57	February 28	@ Dallas	W 104–94	Deron Williams (25)	Mason Plumlee (10)	Anderson, Brown, Jack (4)	American Airlines Center; 20,367	24–33

March : 9–7 (home: 5–5; road: 4–2)

Game	Date	Team	Score	High points	High rebounds	High assists	Location Attendance	Record
58	March 2	Golden State	W 110–108	Brook Lopez (26)	Mason Plumlee (7)	Jarrett Jack (5)	Barclays Center; 17,732	25–33
59	March 4	Charlotte	L 91–115	Deron Williams (12)	Mason Plumlee (7)	Deron Williams (6)	Barclays Center; 16,691	25–34
60	March 6	Phoenix	L 100–108 (OT)	Brook Lopez (19)	Lopez, Jefferson (7)	Deron Williams (7)	Barclays Center; 16,445	25–35
61	March 8	Utah	L 88–95	Lopez, Young (19)	Brook Lopez (10)	Johnson, Jack (5)	Barclays Center; 17,041	25–36
62	March 10	New Orleans	L 91–111	Lopez, Jack (15)	Brook Lopez (9)	Deron Williams (4)	Barclays Center; 16,422	25–37
63	March 11	@ Miami	L 98–104	Williams, Jack (18)	Brook Lopez (14)	Williams, Jack (4)	American Airlines Arena; 19,600	25–38
64	March 14	@ Philadelphia	W 94–87	Thaddeus Young (21)	Thaddeus Young (9)	Jarrett Jack (8)	Wells Fargo Center; 14,865	26–38
65	March 16	@ Minnesota	W 122–106	Joe Johnson (22)	Mason Plumlee (9)	Deron Williams (7)	Target Center; 14,234	27–38
66	March 18	@ Cleveland	L 92–117	Deron Williams (20)	Brook Lopez (8)	Deron Williams (6)	Quicken Loans Arena; 20,562	27–39
67	March 20	Milwaukee	W 129–127 (3OT)	Brook Lopez (32)	Brook Lopez (18)	J.Johnson, Jack (4)	Barclays Center; 16,272	28–39
68	March 21	@ Indiana	W 123–111	Brook Lopez (26)	Thaddeus Young (7)	Deron Williams (6)	Bankers Life Fieldhouse; 16,453	29–39
69	March 23	Boston	L 91–110	Brook Lopez (31)	Williams, Young (7)	Deron Williams (10)	Barclays Center; 16,814	29–40
70	March 25	@ Charlotte	W 91–88	Brook Lopez (34)	Brook Lopez (10)	Deron Williams (14)	Time Warner Cable Arena; 15,091	30–40
71	March 27	Cleveland	W 106–98	Johnson, Lopez (20)	Brook Lopez (9)	Joe Johnson (9)	Barclays Center; 17,732	31–40
72	March 29	L.A. Lakers	W 107–99	Brook Lopez (30)	Brook Lopez (11)	Deron Williams (9)	Barclays Center; 17,732	32–40
73	March 31	Indiana	W 111–106	Brook Lopez (24)	Brook Lopez (11)	Deron Williams (9)	Barclays Center; 16,756	33–40

April : 5–4 (home: 4–2; road: 1–2)

Game	Date	Team	Score	High points	High rebounds	High assists	Location Attendance	Record
74	April 1	@ New York	W 100–98	Deron Williams (26)	Thaddeus Young (9)	Deron Williams (7)	Madison Square Garden; 19,812	34–40
75	April 3	Toronto	W 114–109	Deron Williams (31)	Brook Lopez (17)	Deron Williams (11)	Barclays Center; 17,732	35–40
76	April 4	@ Atlanta	L 99–131	Bojan Bogdanovic (19)	Thaddeus Young (8)	Jarrett Jack (6)	Philips Arena; 18,769	35–41
77	April 6	Portland	W 106–96	Brook Lopez (32)	Brook Lopez (9)	Deron Williams (10)	Barclays Center; 17,416	36–41
78	April 8	Atlanta	L 111–114	Brook Lopez (26)	Thaddeus Young (11)	Deron Williams (13)	Barclays Center; 17,732	36–42
79	April 10	Washington	W 117–80	Brook Lopez (26)	Brook Lopez (9)	Williams, Johnson (9)	Barclays Center; 17,732	37–42
80	April 12	@ Milwaukee	L 73–96	Brook Lopez (12)	Brook Lopez (10)	Deron Williams (7)	BMO Harris Bradley Center; 16,504	37–43
81	April 13	Chicago	L 86–113	Bojan Bogdanovic (17)	Thaddeus Young (11)	Deron Williams (5)	Barclays Center; 17,732	37–44
82	April 15	Orlando	W 101–88	Bojan Bogdanovic (28)	Lopez, Johnson (7)	Deron Williams (7)	Barclays Center; 17,098	38–44

2014–15 season schedule

== Playoffs ==
2015 playoff game log
Total: 2–4 (home: 2–1; road: 0–3)
First Round: 2–4 (home: 2–1; road: 0–3)

Game	Date	Team	Score	High points	High rebounds	High assists	Location Attendance	Series
1	April 19	@ Atlanta	L 92–99	Johnson, Lopez (17)	Brook Lopez (14)	Joe Johnson (6)	Philips Arena; 18,440	0–1
2	April 22	@ Atlanta	L 91–96	Jarrett Jack (23)	Deron Williams (10)	Deron Williams (8)	Philips Arena; 18,207	0–2
3	April 25	Atlanta	W 91–83	Brook Lopez (22)	Brook Lopez (13)	Jarrett Jack (8)	Barclays Center; 17,732	1–2
4	April 27	Atlanta	W 120–115 (OT)	Deron Williams (35)	Brook Lopez (10)	Deron Williams (7)	Barclays Center; 17,732	2–2
5	April 29	@ Atlanta	L 97–107	Alan Anderson (23)	Joe Johnson (9)	Jack, Williams (6)	Philips Arena; 18,105	2–3
6	May 1	Atlanta	L 87–111	Brook Lopez (19)	Jack, Lopez (7)	Joe Johnson (6)	Barclays Center; 17,732	2–4

2015 playoff schedule

== Player statistics ==
Statistics (Summer League, preseason, and regular season)

Legend
GP	Games played	GS	Games started	MPG	Minutes per game
FG%	Field-goal percentage	3P%	3-point field-goal percentage	FT%	Free-throw percentage
RPG	Rebounds per game	APG	Assists per game	SPG	Steals per game
BPG	Blocks per game	PPG	Points per game

=== Summer League ===
Brooklyn Nets statistics
Player	GP	GS	MPG	FG%	3P%	FT%	RPG	APG	SPG	BPG	PPG
Markel Brown	5	5	26.0	.529	.375	.800	4.2	3.2	0.6	0.0	10.0
Kyle Casey	3	0	11.7	.200	.000	.000	2.0	0.3	0.7	1.7	0.7
Daniel Clark	2	0	8.5	.333	.000	.000	1.5	0.0	1.0	0.0	1.0
Donté Greene	5	3	19.4	.333	.294	1.000	3.6	2.8	1.0	0.6	9.4
Jorge Gutiérrez	2	0	9.5	.500	.000	1.000	1.0	1.5	0.5	0.0	4.0
Cory Jefferson	5	2	21.4	.700	.000	.875	6.8	0.2	1.4	1.6	11.2
Michael Jenkins	5	0	15.8	.462	.308	.857	1.8	1.2	0.6	0.0	6.8
Sergey Karasev	1	1	34.0	.444	.500	.500	4.0	3.0	1.0	0.0	11.0
Lasan Kromah	1	0	7.0	.333	.000	.000	1.0	0.0	0.0	0.0	2.0
Nick Minnerath	4	0	8.5	.357	.714	1.000	1.0	0.3	0.0	0.8	4.8
Alen Omic	1	0	10.0	.000	.000	1.000	1.0	0.0	0.0	0.0	2.0
Mason Plumlee	3	3	23.3	.750	.000	.643	4.7	1.7	1.7	0.7	18.0
John Roberson	2	0	6.0	.500	.000	1.000	0.0	0.5	0.0	0.0	2.0
Shane Southwell	0	0	0.0	.000	.000	.000	0.0	0.0	0.0	0.0	0.0
DaJuan Summers	5	4	20.6	.367	.222	.923	4.0	0.6	0.6	0.2	10.4
Marquis Teague	5	3	18.6	.455	.000	.905	1.6	5.8	1.2	0.0	9.8
Xavier Thames	5	2	20.4	.269	.167	.750	1.4	2.4	2.0	0.0	3.6
Adonis Thomas	3	2	17.7	.360	.333	.875	3.3	2.0	0.7	0.0	9.0
Totals	5	—	—	.446	.312	.842	32.4	20.2	10.0	4.4	87.4

Source: NBA.com

=== Regular season ===
Brooklyn Nets statistics
Player	GP	GS	MPG	FG%	3P%	FT%	RPG	APG	SPG	BPG	PPG
Mason Plumlee	82	45	21.3	.573	.000	.495	6.2	.9	.8	.8	8.7
Joe Johnson	80	80	34.9	.435	.359	.801	4.8	3.7	.7	.2	14.4
Jarrett Jack	80	27	28.0	.439	.267	.881	3.1	4.7	.9	.2	12.0
Bojan Bogdanović	78	28	23.8	.453	.355	.821	2.7	.9	.4	.1	9.0
Alan Anderson	74	19	23.6	.443	.348	.812	2.8	1.1	.8	.1	7.4
Brook Lopez	72	44	29.2	.513	.100	.814	7.4	.7	.6	1.8	17.2
Deron Williams	68	55	31.1	.387	.367	.834	3.5	6.6	.9	.3	13.0
Cory Jefferson	50	1	10.6	.449	.133	.574	2.9	.3	.2	.4	3.7
Markel Brown	47	29	16.6	.362	.266	.825	2.3	.8	.7	.3	4.6
Jerome Jordan	44	0	8.7	.532		.864	2.4	.3	.2	.3	3.1
Kevin Garnett^{†}	42	42	20.3	.455	.167	.829	6.8	1.6	1.0	.3	6.8
Mirza Teletović	40	4	22.3	.382	.321	.717	4.9	1.2	.4	.4	8.5
Darius Morris	38	0	7.9	.340	.212	.444	.7	1.3	.2	.0	2.2
Sergey Karasev	33	16	16.8	.403	.296	.763	2.0	1.4	.7	.0	4.6
Thaddeus Young^{†}	28	20	29.6	.495	.380	.606	5.9	1.4	1.4	.3	13.8
Earl Clark	10	0	9.3	.367	.286	.250	2.3	.3	.3	.4	2.7
Jorge Gutiérrez^{†}	10	0	4.4	.500	.000	.667	.7	.7	.1	.0	1.6
Brandon Davies^{†}	7	0	6.3	.333	.250	.750	1.4	.3	.1	.4	2.3
Andrei Kirilenko	7	0	5.1	.000		.750	1.1	.1	.1	.0	.4

=== Playoffs ===
Brooklyn Nets statistics
Player	GP	GS	MPG	FG%	3P%	FT%	RPG	APG	SPG	BPG	PPG
Joe Johnson	6	6	41.5	.362	.293	.792	7.7	4.8	1.2	.0	16.5
Brook Lopez	6	6	39.0	.494		.825	9.0	.8	.7	2.2	19.8
Deron Williams	6	6	32.0	.391	.423	.857	6.2	5.5	1.3	.0	11.8
Thaddeus Young	6	6	31.7	.439	.000	.417	7.2	2.7	.8	.2	10.5
Bojan Bogdanović	6	5	34.3	.390	.333	.714	3.8	1.7	.7	.3	10.3
Jarrett Jack	6	0	25.5	.519	.333	1.000	4.2	4.5	1.2	.2	12.3
Alan Anderson	6	0	23.7	.610	.625	.667	3.5	1.2	.7	.2	11.0
Mason Plumlee	6	0	8.2	.667		.364	1.3	.3	.7	.3	2.0
Mirza Teletović	3	0	5.3	.000	.000		1.3	.0	.3	.0	.0
Markel Brown	2	1	5.0	.400	.000	1.000	1.0	.5	.0	.0	3.0
Earl Clark	2	0	6.5	.200	.667		1.0	.0	.5	.0	3.0
Jerome Jordan	1	0	5.0	.000			2.0	.0	.0	.0	.0
Darius Morris	1	0	5.0	.000			.0	.0	.0	.0	.0

- ^{†} Denotes player spent time with another team in the season. Stats reflect time with the Nets only.

== Roster ==
2014–15 Brooklyn Nets roster
Players

Pos.	No.	Player	Height	Weight	DOB	From
G/F	6	Alan Anderson	6 ft 7 in (2.01 m)	220 lb (100 kg)	1982-10-16	Michigan State
G/F	44	Bojan Bogdanović	6 ft 7 in (2.01 m)	216 lb (98 kg)	1989-04-18	Croatia
G	22	Markel Brown	6 ft 4 in (1.93 m)	185 lb (84 kg)	1992-01-27	Oklahoma State
F	55	Earl Clark	6 ft 9 in (2.06 m)	234 lb (106 kg)	1988-01-17	Louisville
G	0	Jarrett Jack	6 ft 3 in (1.91 m)	200 lb (91 kg)	1983-10-28	Georgia Tech
F/C	21	Cory Jefferson	6 ft 9 in (2.06 m)	220 lb (100 kg)	1990-12-26	Baylor
G/F	7	Joe Johnson	6 ft 7 in (2.01 m)	240 lb (109 kg)	1981-06-29	Arkansas
C	9	Jerome Jordan	7 ft 0 in (2.13 m)	253 lb (115 kg)	1986-09-29	Tulsa
G/F	10	Sergey Karasev (injured)	6 ft 7 in (2.01 m)	196 lb (89 kg)	1993-10-26	Russia
C	11	Brook Lopez	7 ft 0 in (2.13 m)	275 lb (125 kg)	1988-04-01	Stanford
G	14	Darius Morris	6 ft 4 in (1.93 m)	195 lb (88 kg)	1991-01-03	Michigan
F/C	1	Mason Plumlee	6 ft 11 in (2.11 m)	235 lb (107 kg)	1990-03-05	Duke
F	33	Mirza Teletović	6 ft 9 in (2.06 m)	255 lb (116 kg)	1985-09-17	Bosnia and Herzegovina
G	8	Deron Williams	6 ft 3 in (1.91 m)	209 lb (95 kg)	1984-06-26	Illinois
F	30	Thaddeus Young	6 ft 8 in (2.03 m)	221 lb (100 kg)	1988-06-21	Georgia Tech

Coaches
Head coach
- Lionel Hollins
Assistant(s)
- Tony Brown
- Jay Humphries
- John Welch
- Paul Westphal
- Joe Wolf
- Jim Sann (assistant coach/advanced scout)

Legend
- (DP) Unsigned draft pick
- (FA) Free agent
- (S) Suspended
- (DL) On assignment to D-League affiliate
- Injured

Roster
Updated: April 6, 2015

== Transactions ==
=== Trades ===
June 26, 2014	Four-team trade
June 26, 2014	To Brooklyn Nets Draft rights to 44th pick Markel Brown (from Minnesota) Draft rights to 59th pick Xavier Thames (from Toronto) Draft rights to 60th pick Cory Jefferson (from Philadelphia)	To Minnesota Timberwolves Cash considerations (Brooklyn)
June 26, 2014	To Toronto Raptors Cash considerations (Brooklyn)	To Philadelphia 76ers Cash considerations (Brooklyn)
July 1, 2014	To Brooklyn Nets 2015 second-round pick 2019 second-round pick	To Milwaukee Bucks Rights to hire Jason Kidd as head coach
July 10, 2014	Three-team trade
July 10, 2014	To Brooklyn Nets Jarrett Jack (from Cleveland) Sergey Karasev (from Cleveland)	To Boston Celtics Marcus Thornton (Brooklyn) Tyler Zeller (Cleveland)
July 10, 2014	To Cleveland Cavaliers Draft rights to İlkan Karaman (Brooklyn) Draft rights to Edin Bavčić (Brooklyn) Future conditional second round pick (Boston)

=== Free agents ===
==== Re-signed ====
Player	Signed	Contract	Ref.
Andrei Kirilenko	June 24, 2014	Opts in for second year	
Alan Anderson	July 15, 2014	Multi-year deal	

==== Additions ====
Player	Signed	Former team	Ref.
Lionel Hollins (Note: Signed to the team as a coach.)	July 2, 2014	Memphis Grizzlies	
Bojan Bogdanović	July 22, 2014	Fenerbahçe Ülker (TBL)	

==== Subtractions ====
Player	Reason left	Date	New team	Ref.
Shaun Livingston	Free agency	July 11, 2014	Golden State Warriors	
Paul Pierce	Free agency	July 12, 2014	Washington Wizards	

== See also ==
- 2014–15 NBA season
