= Al-Farouq Aminu =

Nigerian-American basketball player (born 1990)

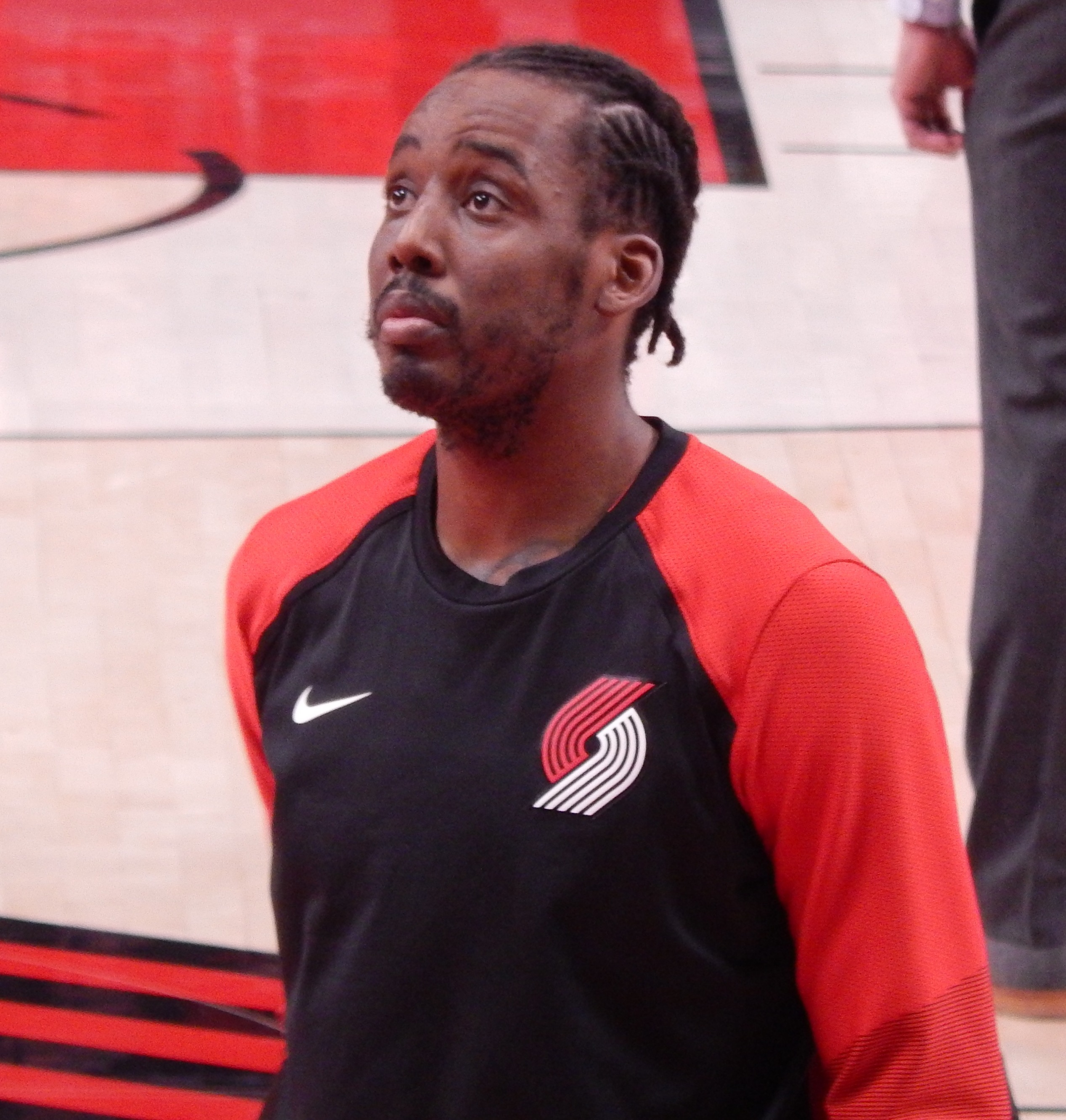
- Aminu with the Portland Trail Blazers in 2019

Personal information
- Born: September 21, 1990 (age 36) Atlanta, Georgia, U.S.
- Listed height: 6 ft 8 in (2.03 m)
- Listed weight: 220 lb (100 kg)

Career information
- High school: Norcross (Norcross, Georgia)
- College: Wake Forest (2008–2010)
- NBA draft: 2010: 1st round, 8th overall pick
- Drafted by: Los Angeles Clippers
- Playing career: 2010–2021
- Position: Small forward / power forward
- Number: 3, 0, 7, 8, 2, 5

Career history
- 2010–2011: Los Angeles Clippers
- 2011–2014: New Orleans Hornets/Pelicans
- 2014–2015: Dallas Mavericks
- 2015–2019: Portland Trail Blazers
- 2019–2021: Orlando Magic
- 2021: Chicago Bulls

Career highlights
- Second-team All-ACC (2010); ACC All-Freshman team (2009); McDonald's All-American (2008); First-team Parade All-American (2008); Mr. Georgia Basketball (2008)
- Stats at NBA.com
- Stats at Basketball Reference
Medals
Men's basketball
Representing Nigeria
FIBA Africa Championship
Gold medal – first place	2015 Tunisia	Team

Al-Farouq Ajadi Aminu (born September 21, 1990) is a Nigerian-American former professional basketball player who played eleven seasons in the National Basketball Association (NBA). He has also represented the Nigeria national basketball team internationally. Aminu was selected by the Los Angeles Clippers in the 2010 NBA draft with the eighth overall pick, and has played for the New Orleans Pelicans, Dallas Mavericks, Portland Trail Blazers, Orlando Magic, and Chicago Bulls.

== High school career ==
Aminu went to Norcross High School and was ranked as one of the top college recruits in the nation from the class of 2008. He was ranked #7 in the nation by Rivals.com and #13 by Scout.com.

Aminu transferred to Norcross between his freshman and sophomore years from Wesleyan School, but was ruled ineligible and had to play on Norcross' JV team his sophomore year. In his junior year, Aminu and teammate Gani Lawal led Norcross to a 30–3 record and a #12 national seed. Aminu averaged 13.7 points and 9.5 rebounds per game in his junior year. He led Norcross to back to back Georgia 5A state titles in 2007 and 2008. He averaged 23.1 points and 11.2 rebounds a game as a senior. Norcross finished 29–2 and ranked #6 in 2008. Aminu was a member of the 2008 McDonald's All-American Team and played in the Jordan Brand Classic where he had 12 points and 13 rebounds.

== College career ==
Aminu committed to Wake Forest in July 2007 and in November 2007 Aminu signed a Letter of Intent to play basketball at Wake Forest. He chose Wake Forest over Georgia Tech.

As a freshman during the 2008–09 season, he was a unanimous selection for the ACC All-Freshman Team. Aminu posted 10 double-doubles on the year, including five in conference action. He led all freshmen and ranked sixth in the ACC with 8.3 rebounds per game. Aminu was also second among all league rookies with 13.0 points per contest.

== Professional career ==
=== Los Angeles Clippers (2010–2011) ===
On April 1, 2010, Aminu hired an agent and declared for the 2010 NBA draft. He was selected with the eighth overall pick by the Los Angeles Clippers. In just his eighth game for the Clippers on November 9, 2010, he had a season-best game with 20 points (a career-high until March 31, 2016) and 8 rebounds against the New Orleans Hornets.

=== New Orleans Hornets/Pelicans (2011–2014) ===
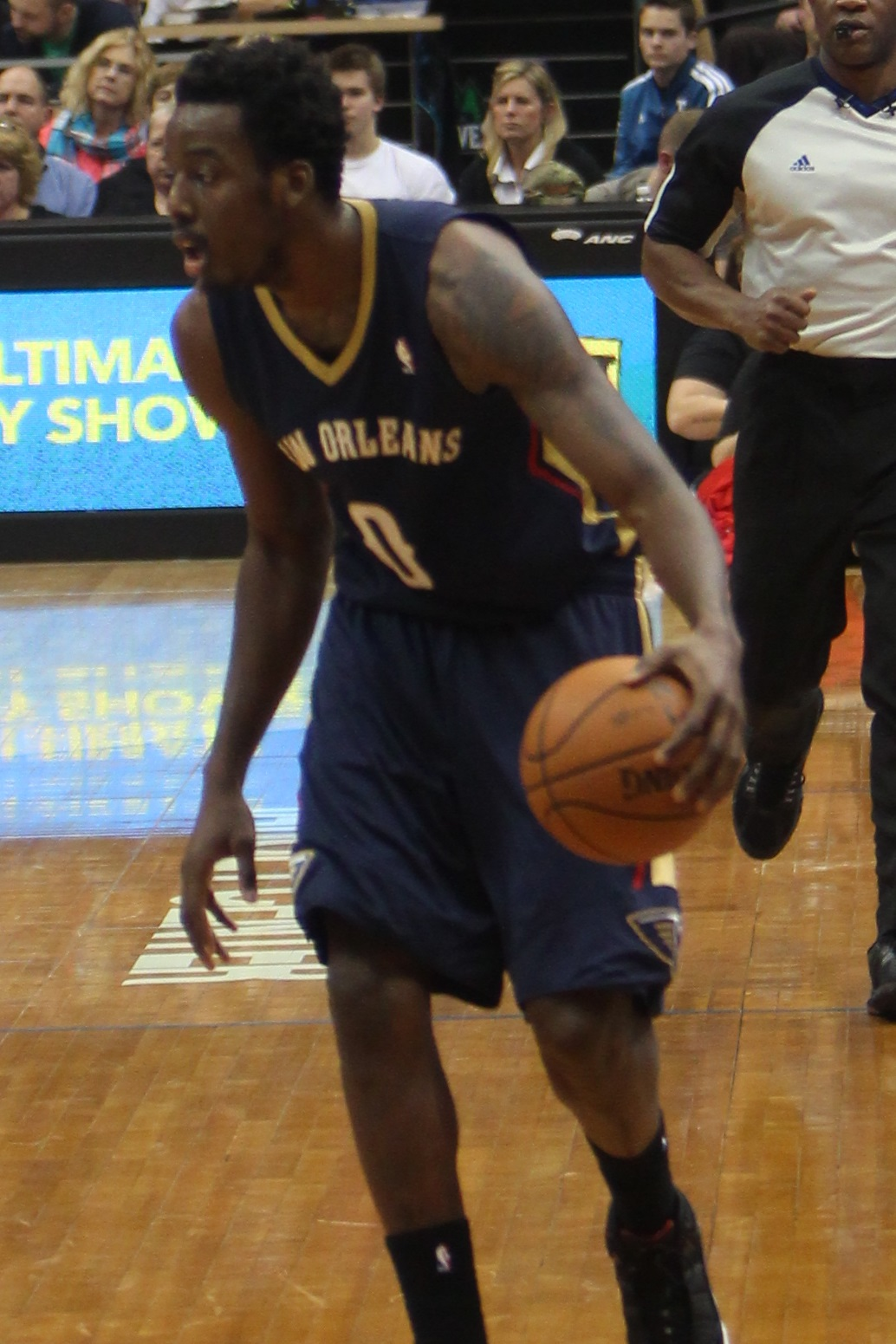
Aminu with the Pelicans in 2014

On December 14, 2011, the Clippers traded Aminu, Chris Kaman, Eric Gordon and a 2012 first-round pick (previously acquired from the Minnesota Timberwolves) to the New Orleans Hornets in exchange for Chris Paul and two future second-round picks.

In the final game of the 2012–13 regular season on April 17, Aminu recorded 16 points and a career-high 20 rebounds in an 87–99 loss to the Dallas Mavericks. The next day, the Hornets changed their name to the Pelicans.

On December 4, 2013, against the Dallas Mavericks once again, Aminu tied his career-best game with 16 points and 20 rebounds in a 97–100 loss.

=== Dallas Mavericks (2014–2015) ===
On July 29, 2014, Aminu signed with the Dallas Mavericks. On February 20, 2015, he had a season-best game with 17 points and 12 rebounds in a 111–100 win over the Houston Rockets.

=== Portland Trail Blazers (2015–2019) ===
On July 9, 2015, Aminu signed a four-year, $30 million contract with the Portland Trail Blazers. On August 1, 2015, he played for Team Africa at the 2015 NBA Africa exhibition game. He made his debut for the Trail Blazers in the team's season opener against the New Orleans Pelicans on October 28, recording 9 points and 8 rebounds in a 112–94 win. On March 26, 2016, Aminu matched his career high with 20 points and grabbed eight rebounds in a 108–105 win over the Philadelphia 76ers. He set a new career high five days later, scoring 28 points while hitting a career-high six three-pointers in a 116–109 win over the Boston Celtics. On April 6, he scored 27 points in a 120–115 win over the Oklahoma City Thunder, helping the Trail Blazers clinch a postseason berth. The Trail Blazers finished the regular season as the fifth seed in the Western Conference with a 44–38 record. In the first round of the playoffs, the Trail Blazers faced the fourth-seeded Los Angeles Clippers, and in a Game 4 win on April 25, Aminu recorded a career-high 30 points and 10 rebounds, helping the team tie the series at 2–2. The Trail Blazers went on to win the series 4–2 and advanced to the second round where they faced the Golden State Warriors. In Game 3 of the series, Aminu recorded 23 points and 10 rebounds to help the Trail Blazers win 120–108, cutting the Warriors' advantage in the series to 2–1. The Trail Blazers went on to lose the series to the Warriors in five games.

After starting in the Trail Blazers' first eight games of the 2016–17 season, Aminu was ruled out for a number of weeks with a calf injury on November 11, 2016. He returned to action on December 5 after missing 13 games and had three points in 17 minutes against the Chicago Bulls. He later missed four games in mid-December with a sore back. On February 9, 2017, he scored a season-high 26 points in a 120–111 loss to the Boston Celtics.

Aminu missed 13 games with a right ankle injury during November 2017. On January 1, 2018, he scored a season-high 24 points in a 124–120 overtime win over the Chicago Bulls.

=== Orlando Magic (2019–2021) ===
On July 6, 2019, Aminu signed with the Orlando Magic. On December 1, 2019, the Orlando Magic announced that Aminu suffered a torn meniscus in his right knee and would be out indefinitely.

=== Chicago Bulls (2021) ===
On March 25, 2021, Aminu and Nikola Vučević were traded to the Chicago Bulls in exchange for Wendell Carter Jr., Otto Porter Jr. and two future first-round picks.

On August 11, 2021, Aminu, Thaddeus Young, and several draft picks were traded to the San Antonio Spurs in exchange for DeMar DeRozan. On October 18, Aminu was waived by the Spurs after appearing in one pre-season game. On December 25, he was signed to a 10-day contract by the Boston Celtics. However, he never played a game in Boston.

== International career ==
Aminu represents the Nigerian national basketball team. He competed at the 2012 Summer Olympics. On August 30, 2015, Aminu with the D'Tigers of Nigeria won the 2015 FIBA Africa Championship (AfroBasket) in Tunisia by defeating Angola 74–65. He was also named in the All-Star Five of the 2015 Afrobasket.

== Personal life ==
Al-Farouq Aminu has one daughter with ex-wife. He is the child of a Yoruba father from Nigeria and an African American mother from New York. Aminu is descended from a line of Nigerian kings. He is a Muslim.

His name translates to "the chief has arrived", leading to the nickname "The Chief." His brother, Alade Aminu, is also a professional basketball forward. Aminu and his wife's foundation, Aminu Good Works Foundation, organizes a yearly basketball camp in Nigeria since 2016. The camp takes place in Ibadan.

== Career statistics ==
Legend
GP	Games played	GS	Games started	MPG	Minutes per game
FG%	Field goal percentage	3P%	3-point field goal percentage	FT%	Free throw percentage
RPG	Rebounds per game	APG	Assists per game	SPG	Steals per game
BPG	Blocks per game	PPG	Points per game	**Bold**	Career high
*	Led the league

=== College ===
Year	Team	GP	GS	MPG	FG%	3P%	FT%	RPG	APG	SPG	BPG	PPG
2008–09	Wake Forest	**31**	**30**	29.0	**.516**	.179	.671	8.2	**1.5**	1.0	1.2	12.9
2009–10	Wake Forest	**31**	**30**	**31.3**	.447	**.273**	**.698**	**10.7**	1.3	**1.4**	**1.4**	**15.8**
Career		62	60	30.1	.476	.238	.687	9.4	1.4	1.2	1.3	14.4

=== NBA ===
==== Regular season ====
Year	Team	GP	GS	MPG	FG%	3P%	FT%	RPG	APG	SPG	BPG	PPG
2010–11	L.A. Clippers	81	14	17.9	.394	.315	.773	3.3	.7	.7	.3	5.6
2011–12	New Orleans	66*	21	22.4	.411	.277	.754	4.7	1.0	.9	.5	6.0
2012–13	New Orleans	76	71	27.2	**.475**	.211	.737	**7.7**	1.4	**1.2**	.7	7.3
2013–14	New Orleans	80	65	25.6	.474	.271	.664	6.2	1.4	1.0	.5	7.2
2014–15	Dallas	74	3	18.5	.412	.274	.712	4.6	.8	.9	**.8**	5.6
2015–16	Portland	**82***	**82***	28.5	.416	.361	.737	6.1	**1.7**	.9	.6	**10.2**
2016–17	Portland	61	25	29.1	.392	.329	.706	7.4	1.6	1.0	.7	8.7
2017–18	Portland	69	67	**30.0**	.395	**.369**	.738	7.6	1.2	1.1	.6	9.3
2018–19	Portland	81	81	28.3	.433	.343	**.867**	7.5	1.3	.8	.4	9.4
2019–20	Orlando	18	2	21.1	.291	.250	.655	4.8	1.2	1.0	.4	4.3
2020–21	Orlando	17	14	21.6	.404	.226	.824	5.4	**1.7**	1.0	.5	5.5
2020–21	Chicago	6	0	11.2	.200	.167	.800	3.2	.3	.3	.0	1.5
Career		711	445	24.9	.420	.332	.746	6.0	1.2	1.0	.6	7.5

==== Playoffs ====
Year	Team	GP	GS	MPG	FG%	3P%	FT%	RPG	APG	SPG	BPG	PPG
2015	Dallas	5	2	30.0	**.548**	**.636**	.789	7.2	1.2	**2.0**	**1.6**	11.2
2016	Portland	11	11	**33.8**	.438	.400	.724	8.6	**1.8**	.7	.9	14.6
2017	Portland	4	0	28.3	.459	.412	.636	6.5	1.0	.8	1.0	12.0
2018	Portland	4	4	32.8	.519	.433	**1.000**	**9.0**	1.3	1.0	.5	**17.3**
2019	Portland	**16**	**16**	24.9	.349	.294	.750	6.3	1.3	.6	.6	7.4
Career		40	33	29.1	.434	.391	.742	7.3	1.4	.9	.9	11.3

== Awards ==
=== College ===
- 2009 Sporting News All-Freshman Team
- 2009 ACC All-Freshman Team (unanimous selection)
- 2009 Runner-up for ACC Freshman of the Year
- 2009 ACC Freshman of the Week (five separate selections)

=== High school ===
- 2008 Named the Atlanta Tipoff Club's Mr. Georgia Basketball
- 2008 Named to the first team all-state by the Atlanta Journal-Constitution
- 2008 McDonald's All American East Squad
- 2008 First-team Parade All-American
- 2008 Jordan Brand All-American Classic
