= 2014–15 San Antonio Spurs season =

- Head coach: Gregg Popovich
- President: Gregg Popovich
- General manager: R. C. Buford
- Owner: Peter Holt
- Arena: AT&T Center

Results
- Record: 55–27 (.671)
- Place: Division: 3rd (Southwest); Conference: 6th (Western)
- Playoff finish: First Round (lost to Clippers 3–4)
- Stats at Basketball Reference

Local media
- Television: FSSW; KENS HD; KMYS
- Radio: 1200 WOAI

The 2014–15 San Antonio Spurs season was the 48th season of the franchise, 39th in the National Basketball Association (NBA) and 42nd in the San Antonio area. The Spurs were the defending NBA Champions, having defeated the Miami Heat in the 2014 NBA Finals 4 games to 1 and winning their fifth NBA championship, and made Tim Duncan the second player in NBA history to win championships in 3 different decades (The first being John Salley). On April 3, 2015, after their victory over the Denver Nuggets they clinched a 50+ win season for the 16th consecutive season. The Spurs started the season slow and exceeded their previous season of 20 losses, but managed an eleven-game winning streak within the last 12 games and finished 55–27, finishing third in the Southwest on a tie breaker to the Memphis Grizzlies.

In the playoffs, the Spurs faced the Los Angeles Clippers in the First Round. The Spurs' season would end in a Game 7 loss, after Chris Paul made a layup with 1 second on the clock and Matt Barnes blocking a desperate final inbound pass as time expired, losing 109–111. It was the first time since 2011 where the Spurs were eliminated in the first round, where they were eliminated by the 8th-seeded Memphis Grizzlies in a shocking upset. They were also the first defending champion since the 2011–12 Dallas Mavericks to be eliminated in the first round. The team hired former WNBA point guard Becky Hammon as an assistant head coach, making her the first full-time female assistant coach in the NBA.

== Preseason ==
=== Draft picks ===
Round	Pick	Player	Position	Nationality	School/club team
1	30	Kyle Anderson	PF	United States	UCLA
2	58	Jordan McRae	SG	United States	Tennessee
2	60	Cory Jefferson	PF	United States	Baylor

== Roster ==
2014–15 San Antonio Spurs roster
Players

Pos.	No.	Player	Height	Weight	DOB	From
SF	1	Kyle Anderson	6 ft 9 in (2.06 m)	235 lb (107 kg)	1993-09-20	UCLA
C	11	Jeff Ayres	6 ft 10 in (2.08 m)	250 lb (113 kg)	1987-04-29	Arizona State
C	16	Aron Baynes	6 ft 10 in (2.08 m)	260 lb (118 kg)	1986-12-09	Washington State
SG	3	Marco Belinelli	6 ft 5 in (1.96 m)	210 lb (95 kg)	1986-03-25	Italy
PF	15	Matt Bonner	6 ft 10 in (2.08 m)	235 lb (107 kg)	1980-04-05	Florida
PF	33	Boris Diaw	6 ft 8 in (2.03 m)	250 lb (113 kg)	1982-04-16	INSEP
PF	21	Tim Duncan	6 ft 11 in (2.11 m)	255 lb (116 kg)	1976-04-25	Wake Forest
SG	20	Manu Ginóbili	6 ft 6 in (1.98 m)	205 lb (93 kg)	1977-07-28	Argentina
SG	14	Danny Green	6 ft 6 in (1.98 m)	210 lb (95 kg)	1987-06-22	North Carolina
PG	5	Cory Joseph	6 ft 3 in (1.91 m)	185 lb (84 kg)	1991-08-20	Texas
SF	2	Kawhi Leonard	6 ft 7 in (2.01 m)	230 lb (104 kg)	1991-06-29	San Diego State
PG	8	Patty Mills	6 ft 0 in (1.83 m)	185 lb (84 kg)	1988-08-11	Saint Mary's
PG	9	Tony Parker	6 ft 2 in (1.88 m)	185 lb (84 kg)	1982-05-17	INSEP
C	22	Tiago Splitter	6 ft 11 in (2.11 m)	245 lb (111 kg)	1985-01-01	Brazil
SF	55	Reggie Williams	6 ft 6 in (1.98 m)	210 lb (95 kg)	1986-09-14	VMI

Coaches
Head coach
- Gregg Popovich
Assistant(s)
- Ettore Messina
- Jim Boylen
- Ime Udoka
- Chip Engelland
- Chad Forcier
- Becky Hammon
- Will Sevening (trainer)

Legend
- (DP) Unsigned draft pick
- (FA) Free agent
- (S) Suspended
- Injured

Roster
Updated: April 21, 2015

== Regular season ==
=== Standings ===
Southwest Division	W	L	PCT	GB	Home	Road	Div	GP
y-Houston Rockets	56	26	.683	–	30‍–‍11	26‍–‍15	8–8	82
x-Memphis Grizzlies	55	27	.671	1.0	31‍–‍10	24‍–‍17	9–7	82
x-San Antonio Spurs	55	27	.671	1.0	33‍–‍8	22‍–‍19	8–8	82
x-Dallas Mavericks	50	32	.610	6.0	27‍–‍14	23‍–‍18	7–9	82
x-New Orleans Pelicans	45	37	.549	11.0	28‍–‍13	17‍–‍24	8–8	82

Western Conference
#	Team	W	L	PCT	GB	GP
1	z-Golden State Warriors *	67	15	.817	–	82
2	y-Houston Rockets *	56	26	.683	11.0	82
3	x-Los Angeles Clippers	56	26	.683	11.0	82
4	y-Portland Trail Blazers *	51	31	.622	16.0	82
5	x-Memphis Grizzlies	55	27	.671	12.0	82
6	x-San Antonio Spurs	55	27	.671	12.0	82
7	x-Dallas Mavericks	50	32	.610	17.0	82
8	x-New Orleans Pelicans	45	37	.549	22.0	82
9	Oklahoma City Thunder	45	37	.549	22.0	82
10	Phoenix Suns	39	43	.476	28.0	82
11	Utah Jazz	38	44	.463	29.0	82
12	Denver Nuggets	30	52	.366	37.0	82
13	Sacramento Kings	29	53	.354	38.0	82
14	Los Angeles Lakers	21	61	.256	46.0	82
15	Minnesota Timberwolves	16	66	.195	51.0	82

== Game log ==
=== Regular season ===
2014–15 game log
Total: 55–27 (home: 33–8; road: 22–19)
October: 1–1 (home: 1–0; road: 0–1)

Game	Date	Team	Score	High points	High rebounds	High assists	Location Attendance	Record
1	October 28	Dallas	W 101–100	Tony Parker (23)	Tim Duncan (13)	Manu Ginóbili (6)	AT&T Center; 19,615	1–0
2	October 31	@ Phoenix	L 89–94	Tony Parker (19)	Tim Duncan (9)	Tony Parker (6)	US Airways Center; 15,050	1–1

November : 11–3 (home: 5–1; road: 6–2)

Game	Date	Team	Score	High points	High rebounds	High assists	Location Attendance	Record
3	November 5	Atlanta	W 94–92	Tim Duncan (17)	Tim Duncan (13)	Tony Parker (7)	AT&T Center; 18,581	2–1
4	November 6	@ Houston	L 81–98	Cory Joseph (18)	Aron Baynes (12)	Kawhi Leonard (5)	Toyota Center; 18,311	2–2
5	November 8	New Orleans	L 99–100	Tony Parker (28)	Kawhi Leonard (14)	Tony Parker (4)	AT&T Center; 18,581	2–3
6	November 10	@ L.A. Clippers	W 89–85	Kawhi Leonard (26)	Tim Duncan (11)	Tony Parker (5)	Staples Center; 19,313	3–3
7	November 11	@ Golden State	W 113–100	Tony Parker (28)	Tim Duncan (13)	Tony Parker (7)	Oracle Arena; 19,596	4–3
8	November 14	@ L.A. Lakers	W 93–80	Cory Joseph (14)	Tim Duncan (11)	Tony Parker (9)	STAPLES Center; 18,997	5–3
9	November 15	@ Sacramento	L 91–94	Manu Ginóbili (21)	Tim Duncan, Boris Diaw (8)	Tony Parker (6)	Sleep Train Arena; 17,317	5–4
10	November 17	Philadelphia	W 100–75	Matt Bonner (18)	Kawhi Leonard (11)	Tony Parker (5)	AT&T Center; 18,581	6–4
11	November 19	@ Cleveland	W 92–90	Tim Duncan, Boris Diaw (19)	Tim Duncan, Kawhi Leonard (10)	Boris Diaw (7)	Quicken Loans Arena; 20,562	7–4
12	November 21	@ Minnesota	W 121–92	Tony Parker (28)	Austin Daye (11)	Tony Parker (5)	Target Center; 12,414	8–4
13	November 22	Brooklyn	W 99–87	Tony Parker (22)	Tim Duncan (10)	Tim Duncan (7)	AT&T Center; 18,581	9–4
14	November 26	Indiana	W 106–100	Manu Ginóbili (28)	Kawhi Leonard (13)	Tony Parker (6)	AT&T Center; 18,581	10–4
15	November 28	Sacramento	W 112–104	Tony Parker (27)	Tim Duncan (8)	Tony Parker, Manu Ginóbili (16)	AT&T Center; 18,581	11–4
16	November 30	@ Boston	W 111–89	Danny Green (18)	Tim Duncan (8)	Tony Parker (9)	TD Garden; 17,121	12–4

December : 8–10 (home: 5–4; road: 3–6)

Game	Date	Team	Score	High points	High rebounds	High assists	Location Attendance	Record
17	December 1	@ Philadelphia	W 109–103	Kawhi Leonard (26)	Kawhi Leonard (10)	Cory Joseph (6)	Wells Fargo Center; 12,843	13–4
18	December 3	@ Brooklyn	L 93–95	Danny Green (20)	Tim Duncan (17)	Tony Parker (6)	Barclays Center; 15,989	13–5
19	December 5	@ Memphis	W 107–101	Manu Ginóbili (17)	Tim Duncan (10)	Tim Duncan (10)	FedExForum; 18,119	14–5
20	December 6	Minnesota	W 123–101	Marco Belinelli (20)	Tim Duncan (10)	Marco Belinelli (6)	AT&T Center; 18,581	15–5
21	December 9	@ Utah	L 96–100	Tim Duncan (23)	Tim Duncan (14)	Manu Ginóbili (8)	EnergySolutions Arena; 18,382	15–6
22	December 10	New York	W 109–95	Marco Belinelli (22)	Jeff Ayres (6)	Cory Joseph (6)	AT&T Center; 18,581	16–6
23	December 12	L. A. Lakers	L 110–112 (OT)	Tim Duncan, Danny Green (19)	Tim Duncan (18)	Cory Joseph (5)	AT&T Center; 18,581	16–7
24	December 14	@ Denver	W 99–91	Kawhi Leonard (18)	Tim Duncan (9)	Manu Ginóbili (6)	Pepsi Center; 16,544	17–7
25	December 15	@ Portland	L 95–108	Kawhi Leonard (21)	Aron Baynes, Kawhi Leonard (9)	Boris Diaw (9)	Moda Center; 19,441	17–8
26	December 17	Memphis	L 116–117 (3OT)	Danny Green (25)	Tim Duncan (16)	Manu Ginóbili (8)	AT&T Center; 18,581	17–9
27	December 19	Portland	L 119–129 (3OT)	Tim Duncan (32)	Tim Duncan, Danny Green (10)	Cory Joseph (7)	AT&T Center; 18,581	17–10
28	December 20	@ Dallas	L 93–99	Marco Belinelli (21)	Aron Baynes (10)	Boris Diaw (4)	American Airlines Center; 20,504	17–11
29	December 22	L.A. Clippers	W 125–118	Tony Parker (26)	Tim Duncan (12)	Manu Ginóbili (10)	AT&T Center; 18,581	18–11
30	December 25	Oklahoma City	L 106–114	Matt Bonner (17)	Tiago Splitter, Manu Ginóbili (7)	Manu Ginóbili (13)	AT&T Center; 18,581	18–12
31	December 26	@ New Orleans	L 90–97	Tim Duncan, Cory Joseph (20)	Tim Duncan (11)	Cory Joseph, Manu Ginóbili (5)	Smoothie King Center; 18,376	18–13
32	December 28	Houston	W 110–106	Danny Green (24)	Tim Duncan (8)	Cory Joseph, Manu Ginóbili (4)	AT&T Center; 18,581	19–13
33	December 30	@ Memphis	L 87–95	Marco Belinelli, Cory Joseph (18)	Tim Duncan (10)	Cory Joseph, Manu Ginóbili, Patty Mills (3)	FedExForum; 18,119	19–14
34	December 31	New Orleans	W 95–93 (OT)	Manu Ginóbili (26)	Tim Duncan (10)	Tim Duncan (5)	AT&T Center; 18,581	20–14

January : 10–4 (home: 7–2; road: 3–2)

Game	Date	Team	Score	High points	High rebounds	High assists	Location Attendance	Record
35	January 3	Washington	W 101–92	Cory Joseph (19)	Tim Duncan (9)	Manu Ginóbili (5)	AT&T Center; 18,581	21–14
36	January 6	Detroit	L 104–105	Jeff Ayres (16)	Tim Duncan, Tiago Splitter (9)	Manu Ginóbili (8)	AT&T Center; 18,581	21–15
37	January 9	Phoenix	W 100–95	Danny Green (20)	Tiago Splitter (14)	Tim Duncan, Boris Diaw, Cory Joseph (5)	AT&T Center; 18,581	22–15
38	January 10	@ Minnesota	W 108–93	Austin Daye (22)	Austin Daye (10)	Cory Joseph (5)	Target Center; 17,871	23–15
39	January 13	@ Washington	L 93–101	Tony Parker (14)	Tim Duncan (12)	Cory Joseph, Manu Ginóbili (5)	Verizon Center; 18,116	23–16
40	January 14	@ Charlotte	W 98–93	Manu Ginóbili (27)	Tim Duncan (10)	Cory Joseph, Tony Parker (5)	Time Warner Cable Arena; 17,309	24–16
41	January 16	Portland	W 110–96	Kawhi Leonard (20)	Tim Duncan (12)	Manu Ginóbili, Tony Parker (7)	AT&T Center; 18,581	25–16
42	January 18	Utah	W 89–69	Tiago Splitter (14)	Aron Baynes (11)	Manu Ginóbili, Tim Duncan, Boris Diaw, Cory Joseph (4)	AT&T Center; 18,581	26–16
43	January 20	@ Denver	W 109–99	Tony Parker (18)	Kawhi Leonard (15)	Manu Ginóbili (8)	Pepsi Center; 14,434	27–16
44	January 22	@ Chicago	L 81–104	Kawhi Leonard (16)	Tim Duncan, Tiago Splitter (7)	Patty Mills (4)	United Center; 21,648	27–17
45	January 23	L. A. Lakers	W 99–85	Tony Parker (17)	Kawhi Leonard (14)	Tony Parker (4)	AT&T Center; 18,581	28–17
46	January 25	Milwaukee	W 101–95	Tim Duncan (20)	Kawhi Leonard (14)	Tony Parker (4)	AT&T Center; 18,581	29–17
47	January 28	Charlotte	W 95–86	Tony Parker (17)	Tim Duncan (14)	Tony Parker (5)	AT&T Center; 18,581	30–17
48	January 31	L.A. Clippers	L 85–105	Kawhi Leonard (24)	Tim Duncan (8)	Tony Parker (8)	AT&T Center; 18,581	30–18

February : 6–5 (home: 2–0; road: 4–5)

Game	Date	Team	Score	High points	High rebounds	High assists	Location Attendance	Record
49	February 4	Orlando	W 110–103	Tim Duncan (26)	Tim Duncan (10)	Manu Ginóbili (10)	AT&T Center; 18,581	31–18
50	February 6	Miami	W 98–85	Kawhi Leonard (24)	Tim Duncan (12)	Manu Ginóbili (9)	AT&T Center; 18,581	32–18
51	February 8	@ Toronto	L 82–87	Tim Duncan, Marco Belinelli (12)	Tim Duncan (12)	Tim Duncan (5)	Air Canada Centre; 19,800	32–19
52	February 9	@ Indiana	W 95–93	Tony Parker (19)	Danny Green (12)	Tony Parker (6)	Bankers Life Fieldhouse; 16,691	33–19
53	February 11	@ Detroit	W 104–87	Danny Green (19)	Danny Green (8)	Tony Parker (6)	The Palace of Auburn Hills; 14,617	34–19
All-Star Break
54	February 19	@ L.A. Clippers	L 115–119	Tim Duncan (30)	Tim Duncan (11)	Tony Parker (13)	STAPLES Center; 19,358	34–20
55	February 20	@ Golden State	L 99–110	Kawhi Leonard, Aron Baynes (12)	Aron Baynes (10)	Tony Parker (6)	Oracle Arena; 19,596	34–21
56	February 23	@ Utah	L 81–90	Tim Duncan (14)	Tim Duncan (10)	Tony Parker (4)	EnergySolutions Arena; 18,782	34–22
57	February 25	@ Portland	L 95–111	Tim Duncan (20)	Tim Duncan, Kawhi Leonard (8)	Tony Parker (4)	Moda Center; 19,650	34–23
58	February 27	@ Sacramento	W 107–96	Tony Parker (19)	Tiago Splitter (9)	Kawhi Leonard (5)	Sleep Train Arena; 17,317	35–23
59	February 28	@ Phoenix	W 101–74	Kawhi Leonard (22)	Kawhi Leonard, Tim Duncan, Aron Baynes (10)	Manu Ginóbili (7)	US Airways Center; 18,055	36–23

March : 12–3 (home: 9–1; road: 3–2)

Game	Date	Team	Score	High points	High rebounds	High assists	Location Attendance	Record
60	March 4	Sacramento	W 112–85	Kawhi Leonard (21)	Aron Baynes (7)	Tim Duncan (4)	AT&T Center; 18,581	37–23
61	March 6	Denver	W 120–112	Kawhi Leonard (25)	Kawhi Leonard (8)	Tony Parker (7)	AT&T Center; 18,581	38–23
62	March 8	Chicago	W 116–105	Kawhi Leonard (25)	Kawhi Leonard, Tim Duncan (8)	Manu Ginóbili (4)	AT&T Center; 18,581	39–23
63	March 10	Toronto	W 117–107	Kawhi Leonard (24)	Tim Duncan (13)	Tony Parker (9)	AT&T Center; 18,581	40–23
64	March 12	Cleveland	L 125–128 (OT)	Tony Parker (31)	Tim Duncan (11)	Tim Duncan (8)	AT&T Center; 18,581	40–24
65	March 15	Minnesota	W 123–97	Kawhi Leonard (15)	Boris Diaw (8)	Tony Parker (8)	AT&T Center; 18,581	41–24
66	March 17	@ New York	L 100–104 (OT)	Tony Parker (21)	Tiago Splitter (13)	Tony Parker (6)	Madison Square Garden; 19,812	41–25
67	March 18	@ Milwaukee	W 114–103	Danny Green (20)	Danny Green (8)	Tim Duncan (7)	BMO Harris Bradley Center; 14,831	42–25
68	March 20	Boston	W 101–89	Kawhi Leonard (22)	Danny Green (7)	Tony Parker (7)	AT&T Center; 18,581	43–25
69	March 22	@ Atlanta	W 114–95	Tiago Splitter (23)	Kawhi Leonard (10)	Kawhi Leonard, Tim Duncan (7)	Philips Arena; 19,193	44–25
70	March 24	@ Dallas	L 94–101	Kawhi Leonard (19)	Kawhi Leonard (9)	Manu Ginóbili, Kawhi Leonard, Patty Mills, Tony Parker (3)	American Airlines Center; 20,328	44–26
71	March 25	Oklahoma City	W 130–91	Tony Parker (21)	Jeff Ayres (8)	Tony Parker (6)	AT&T Center; 18,581	45–26
72	March 27	Dallas	W 94–76	Boris Diaw (19)	Tim Duncan (13)	Manu Ginóbili (6)	AT&T Center; 18,581	46–26
73	March 29	Memphis	W 103–89	Kawhi Leonard (25)	Kawhi Leonard (10)	Tony Parker (6)	AT&T Center; 18,581	47–26
74	March 31	@ Miami	W 95–81	Kawhi Leonard (22)	Tim Duncan (11)	Tony Parker (5)	American Airlines Arena; 20,047	48–26

April : 7–1 (home: 4–0; road: 3–1)

Game	Date	Team	Score	High points	High rebounds	High assists	Location Attendance	Record
75	April 1	@ Orlando	W 103–91	Aron Baynes (18)	Cory Joseph, Kawhi Leonard, Tiago Splitter (7)	Boris Diaw, Tony Parker (4)	Amway Center; 17,229	49–26
76	April 3	Denver	W 123–93	Danny Green (21)	Tim Duncan (7)	Tony Parker (9)	AT&T Center; 18,581	50–26
77	April 5	Golden State	W 107–92	Kawhi Leonard (26)	Tim Duncan (7)	Manu Ginóbili, Tony Parker (5)	AT&T Center; 18,581	51–26
78	April 7	@ Oklahoma City	W 113–88	Kawhi Leonard (26)	Tim Duncan (9)	Boris Diaw, Cory Joseph (6)	Chesapeake Energy Arena; 18,203	52–26
79	April 8	Houston	W 110–98	Tony Parker (27)	Aron Baynes (12)	Cory Joseph (5)	AT&T Center; 18,581	53–26
80	April 10	@ Houston	W 104–103	Tim Duncan (29)	Tim Duncan (10)	Manu Ginóbili, Danny Green, Boris Diaw (4)	Toyota Center; 18,457	54–26
81	April 12	Phoenix	W 107–91	Tim Duncan (22)	Tim Duncan (10)	Tony Parker (5)	AT&T Center; 18,581	55–26
82	April 15	@ New Orleans	L 103–108	Tony Parker (23)	Kawhi Leonard, Tim Duncan (10)	Tim Duncan, Tony Parker (6)	Smoothie King Center; 18,524	55–27

2014–15 season schedule

== Playoffs ==
2015 playoff game log
Total: 3–4 (home: 1–2; road: 2–2)
First Round: 3–4 (home: 1–2; road: 2–2)

Game	Date	Team	Score	High points	High rebounds	High assists	Location Attendance	Series
1	April 19	@ L. A. Clippers	L 92–107	Kawhi Leonard (18)	Tim Duncan (11)	Manu Ginóbili (6)	STAPLES Center; 19,309	0–1
2	April 22	@ L. A. Clippers	W 111–107 (OT)	Tim Duncan (28)	Tim Duncan (11)	Boris Diaw (6)	STAPLES Center; 19,482	1–1
3	April 24	L. A. Clippers	W 100–73	Kawhi Leonard (32)	Tim Duncan (7)	Manu Ginóbili (6)	AT&T Center; 18,581	2–1
4	April 26	L.A. Clippers	L 105–114	Kawhi Leonard (26)	Tim Duncan (14)	Kawhi Leonard (6)	AT&T Center; 18,581	2–2
5	April 28	@ L.A. Clippers	W 111–107	Tim Duncan (21)	Tim Duncan (14)	Manu Ginóbili (6)	STAPLES Center; 19,571	3–2
6	April 30	L.A. Clippers	L 96–102	Marco Belinelli (23)	Tim Duncan (13)	Tony Parker (7)	AT&T Center; 18,581	3–3
7	May 2	@ L.A. Clippers	L 109–111	Tim Duncan (27)	Tim Duncan (11)	Manu Ginóbili (7)	STAPLES Center; 19,588	3–4

2014–15 season schedule

== Player statistics ==
=== Regular season ===
Player	POS	GP	GS	MP	REB	AST	STL	BLK	PTS	MPG	RPG	APG	SPG	BPG	PPG
Danny Green	SG	81	80	2,312	343	158	101	87	946	28.5	4.2	2.0	1.2	1.1	11.7
Boris Diaw	PF	81	15	1,984	348	233	36	23	708	24.5	4.3	2.9	.4	.3	8.7
Cory Joseph	PG	79	14	1,444	192	188	46	17	535	18.3	2.4	2.4	.6	.2	6.8
Tim Duncan	C	77	77	2,227	704	230	63	151	1,070	28.9	9.1	3.0	.8	2.0	13.9
Matt Bonner	PF	72	19	935	115	47	10	12	264	13.0	1.6	.7	.1	.2	3.7
Aron Baynes	C	70	17	1,122	318	35	16	22	461	16.0	4.5	.5	.2	.3	6.6
Manu Ginóbili	SG	70	0	1,587	211	293	67	20	738	22.7	3.0	4.2	1.0	.3	10.5
Tony Parker	PG	68	68	1,953	129	335	44	2	976	28.7	1.9	4.9	.6	.0	14.4
Kawhi Leonard	SF	64	64	2,033	461	161	148	48	1,057	31.8	7.2	2.5	2.3	.8	16.5
Marco Belinelli	SG	62	9	1,388	157	94	31	3	568	22.4	2.5	1.5	.5	.0	9.2
Tiago Splitter	C	52	35	1,030	252	78	35	37	428	19.8	4.8	1.5	.7	.7	8.2
Patty Mills	PG	51	0	801	75	87	28	2	351	15.7	1.5	1.7	.5	.0	6.9
Jeff Ayres	PF	51	0	383	117	14	8	8	137	7.5	2.3	.3	.2	.2	2.7
Kyle Anderson	SF	33	8	358	72	28	15	7	74	10.8	2.2	.8	.5	.2	2.2
Austin Daye^{†}	SF	26	4	268	61	9	8	3	103	10.3	2.3	.3	.3	.1	4.0
Reggie Williams	SF	20	0	105	17	10	1	0	37	5.3	.9	.5	.1	.0	1.9
JaMychal Green^{†}	PF	4	0	25	6	0	0	2	8	6.3	1.5	.0	.0	.5	2.0

- ^{†} Denotes player spent time with another team in the season. Stats reflect time with the Spurs only.

=== Playoffs ===
Player	POS	GP	GS	MP	REB	AST	STL	BLK	PTS	MPG	RPG	APG	SPG	BPG	PPG
Kawhi Leonard	SF	7	7	250	52	18	8	4	142	35.7	7.4	2.6	1.1	.6	20.3
Tim Duncan	C	7	7	250	78	23	9	10	125	35.7	11.1	3.3	1.3	1.4	17.9
Tony Parker	PG	7	7	210	23	25	2	0	76	30.0	3.3	3.6	.3	.0	10.9
Danny Green	SG	7	7	204	22	15	7	7	58	29.1	3.1	2.1	1.0	1.0	8.3
Tiago Splitter	C	7	7	123	31	9	4	1	24	17.6	4.4	1.3	.6	.1	3.4
Boris Diaw	PF	7	0	198	43	25	5	3	81	28.3	6.1	3.6	.7	.4	11.6
Manu Ginóbili	SG	7	0	131	24	32	4	6	56	18.7	3.4	4.6	.6	.9	8.0
Marco Belinelli	SG	7	0	116	13	10	2	0	65	16.6	1.9	1.4	.3	.0	9.3
Patty Mills	PG	7	0	112	19	8	2	0	71	16.0	2.7	1.1	.3	.0	10.1
Matt Bonner	PF	7	0	36	6	1	0	1	6	5.1	.9	.1	.0	.1	.9
Aron Baynes	C	4	0	40	10	1	0	0	9	10.0	2.5	.3	.0	.0	2.3
Cory Joseph	PG	4	0	22	1	0	0	1	11	5.5	.3	.0	.0	.3	2.8
Jeff Ayres	PF	3	0	12	3	2	0	0	0	4.0	1.0	.7	.0	.0	.0

== Transactions ==
=== Free agency ===
==== Re-signed ====
Player	Signed
Patty Mills	3-year contract worth $12 million
Boris Diaw	3-year contract worth $22 million
Matt Bonner	1-year contract worth $1.4 million
Aron Baynes	1-year contract worth $2.1 million

==== Additions ====
Player	Signed	Former team
JaMychal Green		(France) Chorale Roanne
Reggie Williams		Oklahoma City Blue

==== Subtractions ====
Player	Signed	New team
Damion James		Texas Legends
Austin Daye	Waived	Erie BayHawks

== Awards ==
Player Kawhi Leonard	Award Defensive Player of the Year	Date awarded April 23, 2015	Ref.
