= 2014–15 Los Angeles Clippers season =

NBA team season

- Head coach: Doc Rivers
- President: Doc Rivers
- General manager: Doc Rivers
- Owner: Steve Ballmer
- Arena: Staples Center

Results
- Record: 56–26 (.683)
- Place: Division: 2nd (Pacific); Conference: 3rd (Western)
- Playoff finish: Conference Semifinals (lost to Rockets 3–4)
- Stats at Basketball Reference

Local media
- Television: Fox Sports West and Prime Ticket
- Radio: KFWB

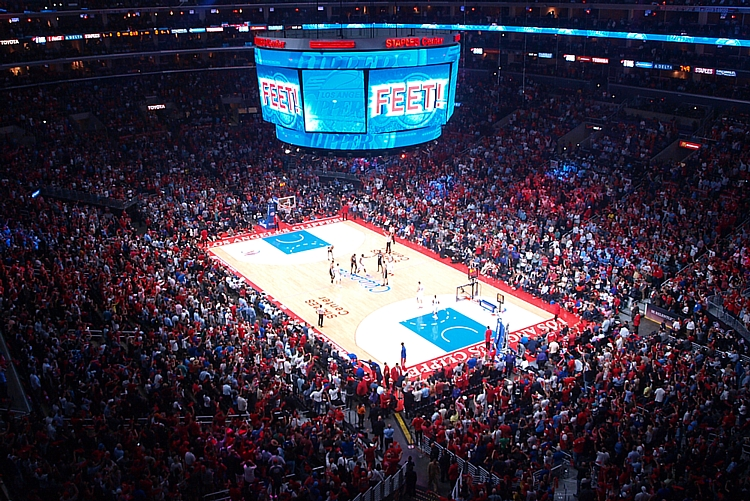
The Clippers hosting the Spurs in game 5 of the 2015 NBA playoffs first-round series

The 2014–15 Los Angeles Clippers season is the 45th season of the franchise in the National Basketball Association (NBA), their 37th season in Southern California, and their 31st season in Los Angeles. Former Microsoft CEO Steve Ballmer became the new owner of Clippers. The team finished 56–26 on the season, only one game fewer than the previous season, clinching the 3rd seed for the NBA playoffs.

In the playoffs, the Clippers faced the defending NBA champion San Antonio Spurs in the first round, winning in seven games after Chris Paul hit a game winning layup with 1 second on the clock and Matt Barnes blocked a desperate final inbound pass by the Spurs as time expired to seal the victory and the series, winning game 7 111–109. The Clippers' season ended with a game 7 loss in the semifinals after leading the series 3–1 over the Houston Rockets, missing out on what could have been the Clippers' first Western Conference finals appearance in franchise history. The Rockets would go on to lose in the Western Conference Finals to the eventual champion Golden State Warriors in 5 games.

== Key dates ==
- June 26, 2014: The 2014 NBA draft took place at Barclays Center in Brooklyn, New York.
- August 12, 2014: Former Microsoft executive Steve Ballmer completes the purchase of the Clippers franchise from the Sterling family trust, for $2 billion.

=== Draft picks ===
| Round | Pick | Player | Position | Nationality | College/Team |
|---|---|---|---|---|---|
| 1 | 28 | C. J. Wilcox | SG | United States | Washington |

== Roster ==
2014–15 Los Angeles Clippers roster
Players

| Pos. | No. | Player | Height | Weight | DOB | From |
|---|---|---|---|---|---|---|
| F | 22 | Matt Barnes | 6 ft 7 in (2.01 m) | 226 lb (103 kg) | 1980-03-09 | UCLA |
| G | 11 | Jamal Crawford | 6 ft 5 in (1.96 m) | 200 lb (91 kg) | 1980-03-20 | Michigan |
| F | 0 | Glen Davis | 6 ft 9 in (2.06 m) | 289 lb (131 kg) | 1986-01-01 | LSU |
| F | 32 | Blake Griffin | 6 ft 10 in (2.08 m) | 251 lb (114 kg) | 1989-03-16 | Oklahoma |
| G/F | 1 | Jordan Hamilton | 6 ft 7 in (2.01 m) | 220 lb (100 kg) | 1990-10-06 | Texas |
| C | 10 | Spencer Hawes | 7 ft 1 in (2.16 m) | 245 lb (111 kg) | 1988-04-28 | Washington |
| G | 14 | Lester Hudson | 6 ft 3 in (1.91 m) | 190 lb (86 kg) | 1984-08-07 | UT Martin |
| G/F | 31 | Dahntay Jones | 6 ft 6 in (1.98 m) | 225 lb (102 kg) | 1980-12-27 | Duke |
| C | 6 | DeAndre Jordan | 6 ft 11 in (2.11 m) | 265 lb (120 kg) | 1988-07-21 | Texas A&M |
| G | 3 | Chris Paul | 6 ft 0 in (1.83 m) | 175 lb (79 kg) | 1985-05-06 | Wake Forest |
| G | 4 | JJ Redick | 6 ft 4 in (1.93 m) | 190 lb (86 kg) | 1984-06-24 | Duke |
| G | 25 | Austin Rivers | 6 ft 4 in (1.93 m) | 200 lb (91 kg) | 1992-08-01 | Duke |
| F | 15 | Hedo Türkoğlu | 6 ft 10 in (2.08 m) | 220 lb (100 kg) | 1979-03-19 | Turkey |
| F/C | 13 | Ekpe Udoh | 6 ft 10 in (2.08 m) | 245 lb (111 kg) | 1987-05-20 | Baylor |
| G | 30 | C. J. Wilcox | 6 ft 5 in (1.96 m) | 201 lb (91 kg) | 1990-12-30 | Washington |

Coaches
Head coach
- Doc Rivers
Assistant(s)
- Sam Cassell
- Lawrence Frank
- Armond Hill
- Brendan O'Connor
- Mike Woodson
- J. P. Clark (player development)
- Dave Severns (player development)

Legend
- (DP) Unsigned draft pick
- (FA) Free agent
- (S) Suspended
- (DL) On assignment to D-League affiliate
- Injured

Roster
Updated: 2015-04-11

=== Roster notes ===
- Guard Jordan Farmar, who had previously played on the Los Angeles Lakers, becomes the 24th player overall to also play for the cross-town rivals, the Clippers. Besides both being based in Los Angeles, the two teams have also played at the Staples Center since 1999. Farmar was later waived after playing in 36 games.
- Assistant coaches Mike Woodson and Sam Cassell previously played for the Clippers franchise. Woodson was on the team from 1986 to 1988, while Cassell played from 2005 to 2008.
- Coach Doc Rivers becomes the first father to coach his son, Austin Rivers, on an NBA team.
- Guard Dahntay Jones currently works as the player development coach for the franchise since 2020.

== Preseason ==
2014 pre-season game log
Total: 2–6 (home: 2–3; road: 0–3)
Pre-season: 2–6 (home: 2–3; road: 0–3)

| Game | Date | Team | Score | High points | High rebounds | High assists | Location Attendance | Record |
|---|---|---|---|---|---|---|---|---|
| 1 | October 7 | Golden State | L 94–112 | Blake Griffin (24) | Griffin (12) | Chris Paul (9) | Staples Center; 13,958 | 0–1 |
| 2 | October 12 | @ Portland | L 114–119 | Jamal Crawford (23) | DeAndre Jordan (8) | Jordan Farmar (7) | Moda Center; 17,784 | 0–2 |
| 3 | October 13 | @ Utah | L 89–102 | Griffin (31) | Jordan (8) | Paul (11) | EnergySolutions Arena; 19,319 | 0–3 |
| 4 | October 17 | Utah | W 101–97 | Jamal Crawford (25) | Jordan (17) | Paul (9) | Staples Center; 13,714 | 1–3 |
| 5 | October 18 | Denver | L 93–104 | Griffin (27) | Jordan (12) | Paul (9) | Mandalay Bay Events Center (Las Vegas); 8,331 | 1–4 |
| 6 | October 21 | @ Golden State | L 107–125 | Jared Cunningham (23) | Jordan (9) | Jordan (5) | Oracle Arena; 19,596 | 1–5 |
| 7 | October 22 | Phoenix | W 108–105 | Griffin (35) | Spencer Hawes (10) | Paul (9) | Staples Center; 13,477 | 2–5 |
| 8 | October 24 | Portland | L 89–99 | Griffin (21) | Jordan (9) | Paul (11) | Staples Center; 15,069 | 2–6 |

2014–15 season schedule

== Regular season ==
=== Standings ===
| Pacific Division | W | L | PCT | GB | Home | Road | Div | GP |
|---|---|---|---|---|---|---|---|---|
| z-Golden State Warriors | 67 | 15 | .817 | – | 39‍–‍2 | 28‍–‍13 | 13–3 | 82 |
| x-Los Angeles Clippers | 56 | 26 | .683 | 11.0 | 30‍–‍11 | 26‍–‍15 | 12–4 | 82 |
| Phoenix Suns | 39 | 43 | .476 | 28.0 | 22‍–‍19 | 17‍–‍24 | 6–10 | 82 |
| Sacramento Kings | 29 | 53 | .354 | 38.0 | 18‍–‍23 | 11‍–‍30 | 7–9 | 82 |
| Los Angeles Lakers | 21 | 61 | .256 | 46.0 | 12‍–‍29 | 9‍–‍32 | 2–14 | 82 |

Western Conference
| # | Team | W | L | PCT | GB | GP |
|---|---|---|---|---|---|---|
| 1 | z-Golden State Warriors * | 67 | 15 | .817 | – | 82 |
| 2 | y-Houston Rockets * | 56 | 26 | .683 | 11.0 | 82 |
| 3 | x-Los Angeles Clippers | 56 | 26 | .683 | 11.0 | 82 |
| 4 | y-Portland Trail Blazers * | 51 | 31 | .622 | 16.0 | 82 |
| 5 | x-Memphis Grizzlies | 55 | 27 | .671 | 12.0 | 82 |
| 6 | x-San Antonio Spurs | 55 | 27 | .671 | 12.0 | 82 |
| 7 | x-Dallas Mavericks | 50 | 32 | .610 | 17.0 | 82 |
| 8 | x-New Orleans Pelicans | 45 | 37 | .549 | 22.0 | 82 |
| 9 | Oklahoma City Thunder | 45 | 37 | .549 | 22.0 | 82 |
| 10 | Phoenix Suns | 39 | 43 | .476 | 28.0 | 82 |
| 11 | Utah Jazz | 38 | 44 | .463 | 29.0 | 82 |
| 12 | Denver Nuggets | 30 | 52 | .366 | 37.0 | 82 |
| 13 | Sacramento Kings | 29 | 53 | .354 | 38.0 | 82 |
| 14 | Los Angeles Lakers | 21 | 61 | .256 | 46.0 | 82 |
| 15 | Minnesota Timberwolves | 16 | 66 | .195 | 51.0 | 82 |

== Game log ==
=== Regular season ===
2014–15 game log
Total: 56–26 (home: 30–11; road: 26–15)
October: 2–0 (home: 1–0; road: 1–0)

| Game | Date | Team | Score | High points | High rebounds | High assists | Location Attendance | Record |
|---|---|---|---|---|---|---|---|---|
| 1 | October 30 | Oklahoma City | W 93–90 | Blake Griffin (23) | DeAndre Jordan (10) | Chris Paul (7) | Staples Center; 19,060 | 1–0 |
| 2 | October 31 | @ L.A. Lakers | W 118–111 | Blake Griffin (39) | DeAndre Jordan (13) | Chris Paul (10) | Staples Center (18,997 | 2–0 |

November : 9–5 (home: 3–3; road: 6–2)

| Game | Date | Team | Score | High points | High rebounds | High assists | Location Attendance | Record |
|---|---|---|---|---|---|---|---|---|
| 3 | November 2 | Sacramento | L 92–98 | Blake Griffin (17) | DeAndre Jordan (9) | Chris Paul (11) | Staples Center; 19,060 | 2–1 |
| 4 | November 3 | Utah | W 107–101 | Blake Griffin (31) | Chris Paul (10) | Chris Paul (12) | Staples Center; 19,060 | 3–1 |
| 5 | November 5 | @ Golden State | L 104–121 | Jamal Crawford (24) | DeAndre Jordan (13) | Chris Paul (12) | Oracle Arena; 19,596 | 3–2 |
| 6 | November 8 | Portland | W 106–102 | JJ Redick (30) | DeAndre Jordan (14) | Chris Paul (11) | Staples Center; 19,060 | 4–2 |
| 7 | November 10 | San Antonio | L 85–89 | Blake Griffin (23) | DeAndre Jordan (13) | Chris Paul (9) | Staples Center; 19,313 | 4–3 |
| 8 | November 15 | Phoenix | W 120–107 | Chris Paul (32) | DeAndre Jordan (18) | Chris Paul (9) | Staples Center; 19,060 | 5–3 |
| 9 | November 17 | Chicago | L 89–105 | Jamal Crawford (24) | DeAndre Jordan (17) | Chris Paul (7) | Staples Center; 19,319 | 5–4 |
| 10 | November 19 | @ Orlando | W 114–90 | Jamal Crawford (22) | DeAndre Jordan (11) | Chris Paul (9) | Amway Center; 16,034 | 6–4 |
| 11 | November 20 | @ Miami | W 110–93 | Blake Griffin & Chris Paul (26 each) | DeAndre Jordan (11) | Chris Paul (12) | American Airlines Arena; 19,685 | 7–4 |
| 12 | November 23 | @ Memphis | L 91–107 | Chris Paul (22) | Spencer Hawes (10) | Chris Paul (5) | FedExForum; 18,119 | 7–5 |
| 13 | November 24 | @ Charlotte | W 113–92 | Blake Griffin & Chris Paul (22) | Blake Griffin (16) | Chris Paul (15) | Time Warner Cable Arena; 17,180 | 8–5 |
| 14 | November 26 | @ Detroit | W 104–98 | Jamal Crawford (25) | DeAndre Jordan (11) | Blake Griffin & Chris Paul (7) | The Palace of Auburn Hills; 13,461 | 9–5 |
| 15 | November 28 | @ Houston | W 102–85 | Blake Griffin (30) | DeAndre Jordan (13) | Chris Paul (7) | Toyota Center; 18,226 | 10–5 |
| 16 | November 29 | @ Utah | W 112–96 | Blake Griffin (28) | DeAndre Jordan (12) | Chris Paul (10) | EnergySolutions Arena; 18,479 | 11–5 |

December : 11–6 (home: 10–1; road: 1–5)

| Game | Date | Team | Score | High points | High rebounds | High assists | Location Attendance | Record |
|---|---|---|---|---|---|---|---|---|
| 17 | December 1 | Minnesota | W 127–101 | Blake Griffin & JJ Redick (23) | DeAndre Jordan (13) | Chris Paul (8) | Staples Center; 19,060 | 12–5 |
| 18 | December 3 | Orlando | W 114–86 | Blake Griffin (21) | DeAndre Jordan (16) | Chris Paul (10) | Staples Center; 19,060 | 13–5 |
| 19 | December 6 | New Orleans | W 120–100 | Blake Griffin (30) | DeAndre Jordan (18) | Chris Paul (16) | Staples Center; 19,060 | 14–5 |
| 20 | December 8 | Phoenix | W 121–120 (OT) | Blake Griffin (45) | DeAndre Jordan (14) | Chris Paul (10) | Staples Center; 19,060 | 15–5 |
| 21 | December 10 | @ Indiana | W 103–96 | Jamal Crawford (18) | DeAndre Jordan (19) | Chris Paul (15) | Bankers Life Fieldhouse; 16,392 | 16–5 |
| 22 | December 12 | @ Washington | L 96–104 | Chris Paul (19) | DeAndre Jordan (8) | Chris Paul (6) | Verizon Center; 17,437 | 16–6 |
| 23 | December 13 | @ Milwaukee | L 106–111 | Matt Barnes (26) | DeAndre Jordan (15) | Blake Griffin (9) | BMO Harris Bradley Center; 16,227 | 16–7 |
| 24 | December 15 | Detroit | W 113–91 | Blake Griffin (18) | DeAndre Jordan (15) | Chris Paul (8) | Staples Center; 19,060 | 17–7 |
| 25 | December 17 | Indiana | W 102–100 | Blake Griffin (31) | DeAndre Jordan (23) | Chris Paul (9) | Staples Center; 19,060 | 18–7 |
| 26 | December 19 | @ Denver | L 106–109 | Blake Griffin (32) | DeAndre Jordan (14) | Chris Paul (15) | Pepsi Center; 15,030 | 18–8 |
| 27 | December 20 | Milwaukee | W 106–102 | Chris Paul (27) | DeAndre Jordan (16) | Chris Paul (9) | Staples Center; 19,060 | 19–8 |
| 28 | December 22 | @ San Antonio | L 118–125 | Chris Paul (25) | DeAndre Jordan (11) | Chris Paul (9) | AT&T Center; 18,581 | 19–9 |
| 29 | December 23 | @ Atlanta | L 104–107 | Blake Griffin (21) | DeAndre Jordan (22) | Blake Griffin (11) | Philips Arena; 19,191 | 19–10 |
| 30 | December 25 | Golden State | W 100–86 | Jamal Crawford (24) | Blake Griffin (15) | Blake Griffin (6) | Staples Center; 19,540 | 20–10 |
| 31 | December 27 | Toronto | L 98–110 | JJ Redick (23) | DeAndre Jordan (20) | Chris Paul (8) | Staples Center; 19,335 | 20–11 |
| 32 | December 29 | Utah | W 101–97 | Blake Griffin (24) | DeAndre Jordan (19) | Chris Paul (8) | Staples Center; 19,060 | 21–11 |
| 33 | December 31 | New York | W 99–78 | JJ Redick (20) | DeAndre Jordan (12) | Blake Griffin (11) | Staples Center; 19,198 | 22–11 |

January : 11–4 (home: 6–3; road: 5–1)

| Game | Date | Team | Score | High points | High rebounds | High assists | Location Attendance | Record |
|---|---|---|---|---|---|---|---|---|
| 34 | January 3 | Philadelphia | W 127–91 | Chris Paul (24) | DeAndre Jordan (10) | Chris Paul (12) | Staples Center; 19,060 | 23–11 |
| 35 | January 5 | Atlanta | L 98–107 | Blake Griffin (26) | DeAndre Jordan (16) | Chris Paul (10) | Staples Center; 19,060 | 23–12 |
| 36 | January 7 | L.A. Lakers | W 114–89 | Blake Griffin (27) | DeAndre Jordan (13) | Chris Paul (11) | Staples Center; 19,487 | 24–12 |
| 37 | January 10 | Dallas | W 120–100 | Blake Griffin (22) | DeAndre Jordan (15) | Chris Paul (13) | Staples Center; 19,060 | 25–12 |
| 38 | January 11 | Miami | L 90–104 | Blake Griffin (26) | Blake Griffin & DeAndre Jordan (6 each) | Chris Paul (9) | Staples Center; 19,060 | 25–13 |
| 39 | January 14 | @ Portland | W 100–94 | Jamal Crawford (25) | DeAndre Jordan (18) | Chris Paul (9) | Moda Center; 19,441 | 26–13 |
| 40 | January 16 | Cleveland | L 121–126 | Blake Griffin (34) | DeAndre Jordan (12) | Chris Paul (14) | Staples Center; 19,380 | 26–14 |
| 41 | January 17 | @ Sacramento | W 117–108 | Blake Griffin (34) | Matt Barnes (10) | Chris Paul (9) | Sleep Train Arena; 16,601 | 27–14 |
| 42 | January 19 | Boston | W 102–93 | Blake Griffin (22) | DeAndre Jordan (12) | Blake Griffin & Chris Paul (6 each) | Staples Center; 19,060 | 28–14 |
| 43 | January 22 | Brooklyn | W 123–84 | Blake Griffin (24) | DeAndre Jordan (12) | Chris Paul (17) | Staples Center; 19,060 | 29–14 |
| 44 | January 25 | @ Phoenix | W 120–100 | Blake Griffin & Chris Paul (23 each) | DeAndre Jordan (14) | Chris Paul (12) | US Airways Center; 17,066 | 30–14 |
| 45 | January 26 | Denver | W 102–98 | Jamal Crawford (23) | DeAndre Jordan (12) | Blake Griffin (10) | Staples Center; 19,060 | 31–14 |
| 46 | January 28 | @ Utah | W 94–89 | Jamal Crawford & Chris Paul (21 each) | DeAndre Jordan (12) | Chris Paul (6) | EnergySolutions Arena; 16,322 | 32–14 |
| 47 | January 30 | @ New Orleans | L 103–108 | Chris Paul (24) | DeAndre Jordan (15) | Chris Paul (7) | Smoothie King Center; 17,932 | 32–15 |
| 48 | January 31 | @ San Antonio | W 105–85 | Blake Griffin (31) | DeAndre Jordan (19) | Chris Paul (6) | AT&T Center; 18,581 | 33–15 |

February : 5–6 (home: 3–1; road: 2–5)

| Game | Date | Team | Score | High points | High rebounds | High assists | Location Attendance | Record |
|---|---|---|---|---|---|---|---|---|
| 49 | February 2 | @ Brooklyn | L 100–102 | DeAndre Jordan (22) | DeAndre Jordan (20) | Chris Paul (8) | Barclays Center; 16,037 | 33–16 |
| 50 | February 5 | @ Cleveland | L 94–105 | Blake Griffin (16) | DeAndre Jordan (14) | Chris Paul (9) | Quicken Loans Arena; 20,562 | 33–17 |
| 51 | February 6 | @ Toronto | L 108–123 | Blake Griffin (26) | Matt Barnes & DeAndre Jordan (7 each) | Chris Paul & DeAndre Jordan (9 each) | Air Canada Centre; 19,800 | 33–18 |
| 52 | February 8 | @ Oklahoma City | L 108–131 | Jamal Crawford (21) | DeAndre Jordan (10) | Chris Paul (13) | Chesapeake Energy Arena; 18,203 | 33–19 |
| 53 | February 9 | @ Dallas | W 115–98 | Chris Paul (25) | DeAndre Jordan (27) | Chris Paul (13) | American Airlines Center; 20,082 | 34–19 |
| 54 | February 11 | Houston | W 110–95 | DeAndre Jordan (24) | DeAndre Jordan (20) | Chris Paul (12) | Staples Center; 19,060 | 35–19 |
All-Star Break
| 55 | February 19 | San Antonio | W 119–115 | DeAndre Jordan & Jamal Crawford (26) | DeAndre Jordan (20) | Chris Paul (12) | Staples Center; 19,358 | 36–19 |
| 56 | February 21 | Sacramento | W 126–99 | Austin Rivers (28) | DeAndre Jordan (15) | Chris Paul (9) | Staples Center; 19,133 | 37–19 |
| 57 | February 23 | Memphis | L 87–90 | Chris Paul (30) | DeAndre Jordan (17) | Chris Paul (10) | Staples Center; 19,161 | 37–20 |
| 58 | February 25 | @ Houston | L 105–110 | Jamal Crawford (24) | DeAndre Jordan (22) | Chris Paul (13) | Toyota Center; 18,154 | 37–21 |
| 59 | February 27 | @ Memphis | W 97–79 | Chris Paul & Jamal Crawford (19) | DeAndre Jordan (19) | Chris Paul (14) | FedExForum; 18,119 | 38–21 |

March : 11–5 (home: 4–3; road: 7–2)

| Game | Date | Team | Score | High points | High rebounds | High assists | Location Attendance | Record |
|---|---|---|---|---|---|---|---|---|
| 60 | March 1 | @ Chicago | W 96–86 | Chris Paul (28) | DeAndre Jordan (26) | Chris Paul (12) | United Center; 21,680 | 39–21 |
| 61 | March 2 | @ Minnesota | W 110–105 | Chris Paul (26) | DeAndre Jordan (18) | Chris Paul (14) | Target Center; 18,239 | 40–21 |
| 62 | March 4 | Portland | L 93–98 (OT) | Chris Paul (36) | DeAndre Jordan (19) | Chris Paul (12) | Staples Center; 19,060 | 40–22 |
| 63 | March 8 | @ Golden State | L 98–106 | Austin Rivers (22) | DeAndre Jordan (14) | Chris Paul (11) | Oracle Arena; 19,596 | 40–23 |
| 64 | March 9 | Minnesota | W 89–76 | DeAndre Jordan (20) | DeAndre Jordan (17) | Chris Paul (11) | Staples Center; 19,060 | 41–23 |
| 65 | March 11 | @ Oklahoma City | W 120–108 | Chris Paul (33) | DeAndre Jordan (17) | Chris Paul (9) | Chesapeake Energy Arena; 18,203 | 42–23 |
| 66 | March 13 | @ Dallas | L 99–129 | JJ Redick (17) | DeAndre Jordan (8) | Chris Paul (7) | American Airlines Center; 20,444 | 42–24 |
| 67 | March 15 | Houston | L 98–100 | Chris Paul (23) | DeAndre Jordan (20) | Blake Griffin (8) | Staples Center; 19,211 | 42–25 |
| 68 | March 17 | Charlotte | W 99–92 | JJ Redick (23) | DeAndre Jordan (14) | Chris Paul (8) | Staples Center; 19,060 | 43–25 |
| 69 | March 18 | @ Sacramento | W 116–105 | Chris Paul (30) | DeAndre Jordan (15) | Chris Paul (11) | Sleep Train Arena; 16,785 | 44–25 |
| 70 | March 20 | Washington | W 113–99 | Chris Paul (30) | DeAndre Jordan (23) | Chris Paul (15) | Staples Center; 19,218 | 45–25 |
| 71 | March 22 | New Orleans | W 107–100 | Chris Paul & Blake Griffin (23) | DeAndre Jordan (16) | Chris Paul (11) | Staples Center; 19,299 | 46–25 |
| 72 | March 25 | @ New York | W 111–80 | Austin Rivers (21) | DeAndre Jordan (10) | Chris Paul (16) | Madison Square Garden; 19,812 | 47–25 |
| 73 | March 27 | @ Philadelphia | W 119–98 | Chris Paul (25) | DeAndre Jordan (20) | Chris Paul (7) | Wells Fargo Center; 16,070 | 48–25 |
| 74 | March 29 | @ Boston | W 119–106 | JJ Redick (27) | DeAndre Jordan (14) | Chris Paul (10) | TD Garden; 18,624 | 49–25 |
| 75 | March 31 | Golden State | L 106–110 | Blake Griffin (40) | Blake Griffin (12) | Chris Paul (9) | Staples Center; 19,601 | 49–26 |

April : 7–0 (home: 3–0; road: 4–0)

| Game | Date | Team | Score | High points | High rebounds | High assists | Location Attendance | Record |
|---|---|---|---|---|---|---|---|---|
| 76 | April 1 | @ Portland | W 126–122 | Chris Paul (41) | DeAndre Jordan (13) | Chris Paul (17) | Moda Center; 19,639 | 50–26 |
| 77 | April 4 | @ Denver | W 107–92 | JJ Redick (25) | DeAndre Jordan (22) | Chris Paul (9) | Pepsi Center; 15,566 | 51–26 |
| 78 | April 5 | @ L.A. Lakers | W 106–78 | Blake Griffin (18) | DeAndre Jordan (11) | Chris Paul (15) | Staples Center; 18,997 | 52–26 |
| 79 | April 7 | L.A. Lakers | W 105–100 | Blake Griffin & JJ Redick (27) | DeAndre Jordan (17) | Chris Paul (10) | Staples Center; 19,438 | 53–26 |
| 80 | April 11 | Memphis | W 94–86 | Blake Griffin & JJ Redick (18) | DeAndre Jordan (16) | Chris Paul (14) | Staples Center; 19,401 | 54–26 |
| 81 | April 13 | Denver | W 110–103 | DeAndre Jordan & JJ Redick (20) | DeAndre Jordan (21) | Chris Paul (9) | Staples Center; 19,060 | 55–26 |
| 82 | April 14 | @ Phoenix | W 112–101 | Chris Paul (22) | DeAndre Jordan (14) | Chris Paul (6) | US Airways Center; 18,055 | 56–26 |

2014–15 season schedule

== Playoffs ==
2015 playoff game log
Total: 7–7 (home: 4–3; road: 3–4)
First Round: 4–3 (home: 2–2; road: 2–1)

| Game | Date | Team | Score | High points | High rebounds | High assists | Location Attendance | Series |
|---|---|---|---|---|---|---|---|---|
| 1 | April 19 | San Antonio | W 107–92 | Chris Paul (32) | DeAndre Jordan (14) | Griffin & Paul (6) | Staples Center; 19,309 | 1–0 |
| 2 | April 22 | San Antonio | L 107–111 (OT) | Blake Griffin (29) | DeAndre Jordan (15) | Blake Griffin (11) | Staples Center; 19,482 | 1–1 |
| 3 | April 24 | @ San Antonio | L 73–100 | Blake Griffin (14) | Blake Griffin (10) | Blake Griffin (6) | AT&T Center; 18,581 | 1–2 |
| 4 | April 26 | @ San Antonio | W 114–105 | Chris Paul (34) | Blake Griffin (17) | Chris Paul (7) | AT&T Center; 18,581 | 2–2 |
| 5 | April 28 | San Antonio | L 107–111 | Blake Griffin (30) | Jordan, Griffin (14) | Chris Paul (10) | Staples Center; 19,571 | 2–3 |
| 6 | April 30 | @ San Antonio | W 102–96 | Blake Griffin (26) | DeAndre Jordan (14) | Chris Paul (15) | AT&T Center; 18,581 | 3–3 |
| 7 | May 2 | San Antonio | W 111–109 | Chris Paul (27) | DeAndre Jordan (14) | Blake Griffin (10) | Staples Center; 19,588 | 4–3 |

Conference Semifinals: 3–4 (home: 2–1; road: 1–3)

| Game | Date | Team | Score | High points | High rebounds | High assists | Location Attendance | Series |
|---|---|---|---|---|---|---|---|---|
| 1 | May 4 | @ Houston | W 117–101 | Blake Griffin (26) | Blake Griffin (14) | Blake Griffin (13) | Toyota Center; 18,231 | 1–0 |
| 2 | May 6 | @ Houston | L 109–115 | Blake Griffin (34) | Blake Griffin (15) | Jamal Crawford (5) | Toyota Center; 18,310 | 1–1 |
| 3 | May 8 | Houston | W 124–99 | JJ Redick (31) | DeAndre Jordan (14) | Chris Paul (7) | Staples Center; 19,367 | 2–1 |
| 4 | May 10 | Houston | W 128–95 | DeAndre Jordan (26) | DeAndre Jordan (17) | Chris Paul (12) | Staples Center; 19,490 | 3–1 |
| 5 | May 12 | @ Houston | L 103–124 | Blake Griffin (30) | Blake Griffin (16) | Chris Paul (10) | Toyota Center; 18,142 | 3–2 |
| 6 | May 14 | Houston | L 107–119 | Chris Paul (31) | Matt Barnes (10) | Chris Paul (11) | Staples Center; 19,417 | 3–3 |
| 7 | May 17 | @ Houston | L 100–113 | Blake Griffin (27) | DeAndre Jordan (17) | Chris Paul (10) | Toyota Center; 18,463 | 3–4 |

2014–15 season schedule

== Player statistics ==
Legend
| GP | Games played | GS | Games started | MPG | Minutes per game |
| FG% | Field-goal percentage | 3P% | 3-point field-goal percentage | FT% | Free-throw percentage |
| RPG | Rebounds per game | APG | Assists per game | SPG | Steals per game |
| BPG | Blocks per game | PPG | Points per game |

=== Regular season ===
| Player | GP | GS | MPG | FG% | 3P% | FT% | RPG | APG | SPG | BPG | PPG |
|---|---|---|---|---|---|---|---|---|---|---|---|
| Chris Paul | 82 | 82 | 34.8 | .485 | .398 | .900 | 4.6 | 10.2 | 1.9 | .2 | 19.1 |
| DeAndre Jordan | 82 | 82 | 34.4 | .710 | .250 | .397 | 15.0 | .7 | 1.0 | 2.2 | 11.5 |
| JJ Redick | 78 | 78 | 30.9 | .477 | .437 | .901 | 2.1 | 1.8 | .5 | .1 | 16.4 |
| Matt Barnes | 76 | 74 | 29.9 | .444 | .362 | .779 | 4.0 | 1.5 | .9 | .7 | 10.1 |
| Glen Davis | 74 | 0 | 12.2 | .459 | .000 | .632 | 2.3 | .5 | .6 | .3 | 4.0 |
| Spencer Hawes | 73 | 15 | 17.5 | .393 | .313 | .647 | 3.5 | 1.2 | .3 | .7 | 5.8 |
| Blake Griffin | 67 | 67 | 35.2 | .502 | .400 | .728 | 7.6 | 5.3 | .9 | .5 | 21.9 |
| Jamal Crawford | 64 | 4 | 26.6 | .396 | .327 | .901 | 1.9 | 2.5 | .9 | .2 | 15.8 |
| Hedo Türkoğlu | 62 | 2 | 11.4 | .441 | .432 | .545 | 1.6 | .6 | .3 | .1 | 3.7 |
| Austin Rivers^{†} | 41 | 2 | 19.3 | .427 | .309 | .582 | 2.0 | 1.7 | .7 | .2 | 7.1 |
| Jordan Farmar | 36 | 0 | 14.7 | .386 | .361 | .909 | 1.2 | 1.9 | .6 | .1 | 4.6 |
| Ekpe Udoh | 33 | 0 | 3.9 | .458 | | .778 | .8 | .2 | .2 | .2 | .9 |
| Dahntay Jones | 33 | 0 | 3.7 | .286 | .000 | .818 | .3 | .1 | .1 | .0 | .6 |
| Reggie Bullock^{†} | 25 | 2 | 10.5 | .426 | .385 | .800 | 1.6 | .2 | .4 | .1 | 2.6 |
| C. J. Wilcox | 21 | 0 | 4.8 | .421 | .368 | 1.000 | .3 | .4 | .1 | .0 | 2.0 |
| Jared Cunningham | 19 | 0 | 4.7 | .364 | .308 | .538 | .5 | .5 | .2 | .0 | 1.8 |
| Jordan Hamilton | 14 | 2 | 8.7 | .400 | .476 | | 1.1 | .5 | .1 | .0 | 2.7 |
| Chris Douglas-Roberts | 12 | 0 | 8.6 | .238 | .143 | 1.000 | 1.0 | .3 | .1 | .0 | 1.6 |
| Nate Robinson^{†} | 9 | 0 | 14.0 | .333 | .350 | .833 | 1.2 | 2.2 | .7 | .0 | 5.1 |
| Lester Hudson | 5 | 0 | 11.2 | .429 | .500 | .750 | 1.6 | 1.0 | 1.2 | .2 | 3.6 |

=== Playoffs ===
| Player | GP | GS | MPG | FG% | 3P% | FT% | RPG | APG | SPG | BPG | PPG |
|---|---|---|---|---|---|---|---|---|---|---|---|
| Blake Griffin | 14 | 14 | 39.8 | .511 | .143 | .717 | 12.7 | 6.1 | 1.0 | 1.0 | 25.5 |
| JJ Redick | 14 | 14 | 38.6 | .435 | .398 | .943 | 2.1 | 1.7 | .7 | .4 | 14.9 |
| DeAndre Jordan | 14 | 14 | 34.4 | .716 | | .427 | 13.4 | 1.1 | 1.1 | 2.4 | 13.1 |
| Matt Barnes | 14 | 14 | 29.2 | .380 | .267 | .750 | 5.1 | 1.6 | 1.4 | .7 | 7.6 |
| Austin Rivers | 14 | 2 | 17.9 | .438 | .371 | .632 | 1.7 | 1.1 | .7 | .3 | 8.4 |
| Jamal Crawford | 14 | 0 | 27.1 | .360 | .243 | .867 | 2.1 | 1.9 | .9 | .2 | 12.7 |
| Glen Davis | 14 | 0 | 10.3 | .447 | .000 | .778 | 1.9 | .2 | .4 | .4 | 2.9 |
| Chris Paul | 12 | 12 | 37.1 | .503 | .415 | .941 | 4.4 | 8.8 | 1.8 | .3 | 22.1 |
| Hedo Türkoğlu | 11 | 0 | 5.0 | .235 | .154 | | .6 | .4 | .4 | .1 | .9 |
| Dahntay Jones | 11 | 0 | 1.6 | 1.000 | | | .1 | .0 | .2 | .0 | .4 |
| Spencer Hawes | 8 | 0 | 7.1 | .529 | .500 | 1.000 | 1.6 | .6 | .3 | .4 | 2.9 |
| Lester Hudson | 7 | 0 | 5.4 | .429 | .286 | | .1 | 1.0 | .3 | .1 | 2.0 |
| Ekpe Udoh | 4 | 0 | 3.0 | .333 | | | .8 | .0 | .0 | .0 | .5 |

- ^{†} Denotes player spent time with another team in the season. Stats reflect time with the Clippers only.

== Transactions ==
=== Trades ===
August 26, 2014
To Los Angeles Clippers

Carlos Delfino

Miroslav Raduljica

2015 2nd-round draft pick
To Milwaukee Bucks

Jared Dudley

2017 1st-round draft pick
January 7, 2015
To Los Angeles Clippers

Draft rights to Sergei Lishouk

To Philadelphia 76ers

Jared Cunningham

Draft rights to Cenk Akyol

Cash considerations
January 15, 2015
To Los Angeles Clippers

Austin Rivers (from Boston)

To Boston Celtics

Chris Douglas-Roberts (from Los Angeles)

2017 2nd-round draft pick (from Los Angeles)

Shavlik Randolph (from Phoenix)
To Phoenix Suns

Reggie Bullock (from Los Angeles)

=== Free agents ===
==== Re-signed ====
| Player | Signed | Contract |
|---|---|---|
| Glen Davis | July 18, 2014 | 1-year deal |
| Hedo Türkoğlu | September 12, 2014 | 1-year deal |

==== Additions ====
| Player | Signed | Former team |
|---|---|---|
| Jordan Farmar | July 9, 2014 | Los Angeles Lakers |
| Spencer Hawes | July 9, 2014 | Cleveland Cavaliers |
| Chris Douglas-Roberts | September 3, 2014 | Charlotte Bobcats |
| Ekpe Udoh | September 3, 2014 | Milwaukee Bucks |
| Jared Cunningham | September 29, 2013 | Sacramento Kings |
| Dahntay Jones | January 14, 2015 | Fort Wayne Mad Ants (NBDL) |
| Jordan Hamilton | February 24, 2015 | Reno Bighorns (NBDL) |
| Nate Robinson | March 7, 2015 | Boston Celtics |
| Lester Hudson | March 29, 2015 | Liaoning Flying Leopards (CBA) |

==== Subtractions ====
| Player | Reason left | New team |
|---|---|---|
| Willie Green | Waived, June 29, 2014 | Orlando Magic |
| Darren Collison | Free agency, July 12, 2014 | Sacramento Kings |
| Danny Granger | Free agency, July 14, 2014 | Miami Heat |
| Carlos Delfino | Waived, August 29, 2014 | Argentina national basketball team |
| Miroslav Raduljica | Waived, August 29, 2014 | Shandong Lions (CBA) |
| Ryan Hollins | Free agency, September 18, 2014 | Sacramento Kings |
| Jordan Farmar | Waived, January 16, 2015 | Darüşşafaka Doğuş (TBL) |
| Nate Robinson | Contract expired, March 27, 2015 | New Orleans Pelicans |
