= 2014–15 Dallas Mavericks season =

NBA professional basketball team season

- Head coach: Rick Carlisle
- President: Donnie Nelson
- General manager: Donnie Nelson
- Owner: Mark Cuban
- Arena: American Airlines Center

Results
- Record: 50–32 (.610)
- Place: Division: 4th (Southwest); Conference: 7th (Western)
- Playoff finish: First Round (lost to Rockets 1–4)
- Stats at Basketball Reference

Local media
- Television: FS Southwest; KTXA
- Radio: KESN

The 2014–15 Dallas Mavericks season was the 35th season of the franchise in the National Basketball Association (NBA). The Mavericks finished fourth in the Southwest Division and seventh in the Western Conference with a 50–32 record. The Mavs' season ended with a 1–4 first round playoff series loss to the Houston Rockets.

The Mavericks acquired Rajon Rondo from the Boston Celtics in a mid-season trade. However, Rondo ran into problems with head coach Rick Carlisle including engaging in a shouting match with Carlisle after being benched. Rondo left the team at the end of the season to join the Sacramento Kings. Monta Ellis led the team in scoring which marked the first time since 1999-2000 someone other than Dirk Nowitzki led the Mavericks in scoring.

== Draft ==
Both second-round picks the Mavericks had were traded one day prior to the draft to the New York Knicks along with José Calderón, Samuel Dalembert, Shane Larkin, and Wayne Ellington for Tyson Chandler and Raymond Felton.

== Offseason ==
The Mavericks went into the offseason with six free agents. Being on the Mavs for his whole career, Dirk Nowitzki agreed to a new three-year contract on July 4. One day later, Devin Harris accepted a new four-year deal with the Mavs.

On July 10, the Mavs submitted a three-year, $46 million offer sheet signed by restricted free agent Chandler Parsons to the Houston Rockets. Three days later, the Rockets announced they would not match the offer, leaving Parsons to play in Dallas.

Richard Jefferson agreed to a one-year minimum contract on July 13.

On July 14, Greg Smith came to the Mavs through a trade with the Chicago Bulls for the rights to Tadija Dragićević.

Rashard Lewis agreed to a one-year minimum contract on July 16. After closing the deal on July 19, his contract was voided four days later, as it was announced that he failed the physical test and required a knee surgery.

On July 18, the Mavs signed Eric Griffin to a nonguaranteed contract.

Al-Farouq Aminu agreed to a two-year minimum contract on July 24. On the same day, Jameer Nelson agreed to a two-year contract.

On July 29, the Mavs signed Ivan Johnson to a partially guaranteed contract.

Bernard James signed a new one-year contract on September 3.

On September 8, the Mavs signed Charlie Villanueva to a nonguaranteed contract.

Doron Lamb signed a nonguaranteed contract on September 22.

Yuki Togashi was signed on October 15.

On October 21, 2014, the Mavericks waived Yuki Togashi and Eric Griffin.

The Mavericks waived Bernard James, Ivan Johnson and Doron Lamb on October 25, 2014.

On October 29, 2014, the Mavericks signed José Juan Barea and waived Gal Mekel.

== Roster ==
2014–15 Dallas Mavericks roster
Players

Pos.	No.	Player	Height	Weight	DOB	From
F	7	Al-Farouq Aminu	6 ft 9 in (2.06 m)	215 lb (98 kg)	1990–09–21	Wake Forest
G	5	José Juan Barea	6 ft 0 in (1.83 m)	183 lb (83 kg)	1984–06–26	Northeastern
C	6	Tyson Chandler	7 ft 1 in (2.16 m)	245 lb (111 kg)	1982–10–02	Dominguez HS (CA)
G	11	Monta Ellis	6 ft 3 in (1.91 m)	185 lb (84 kg)	1985–10–26	Lanier HS (MS)
G	2	Raymond Felton	6 ft 1 in (1.85 m)	205 lb (93 kg)	1984–06–26	North Carolina
G	20	Devin Harris	6 ft 3 in (1.91 m)	192 lb (87 kg)	1983–02–27	Wisconsin
C	55	Bernard James	6 ft 10 in (2.08 m)	240 lb (109 kg)	1985–02–07	Florida State
F	24	Richard Jefferson	6 ft 7 in (2.01 m)	234 lb (106 kg)	1980–06–21	Arizona
F	41	Dirk Nowitzki	7 ft 0 in (2.13 m)	245 lb (111 kg)	1978–06–19	Germany
F	25	Chandler Parsons	6 ft 9 in (2.06 m)	227 lb (103 kg)	1988–10–25	Florida
F	8	Dwight Powell	6 ft 11 in (2.11 m)	240 lb (109 kg)	1991–07–20	Stanford
G	9	Rajon Rondo	6 ft 1 in (1.85 m)	186 lb (84 kg)	1986–02–22	Kentucky
F	4	Greg Smith	6 ft 10 in (2.08 m)	250 lb (113 kg)	1991–01–08	Fresno State
F/C	1	Amar'e Stoudemire	6 ft 11 in (2.11 m)	245 lb (111 kg)	1982–11–16	Cypress Creek HS (FL)
F	3	Charlie Villanueva	6 ft 11 in (2.11 m)	232 lb (105 kg)	1984–08–24	Connecticut

Coaches
Head coach
- Rick Carlisle
Assistant(s)
- Darrell Armstrong
- Kaleb Canales
- Monte Mathis
- Jamahl Mosley

Legend
- (DP) Unsigned draft pick
- (FA) Free agent
- (S) Suspended
- Injured

Roster
Updated: 2015–04–04

== Standings ==
=== Conference ===
Western Conference
#	Team	W	L	PCT	GB	GP
1	z-Golden State Warriors *	67	15	.817	–	82
2	y-Houston Rockets *	56	26	.683	11.0	82
3	x-Los Angeles Clippers	56	26	.683	11.0	82
4	y-Portland Trail Blazers *	51	31	.622	16.0	82
5	x-Memphis Grizzlies	55	27	.671	12.0	82
6	x-San Antonio Spurs	55	27	.671	12.0	82
7	x-Dallas Mavericks	50	32	.610	17.0	82
8	x-New Orleans Pelicans	45	37	.549	22.0	82
9	Oklahoma City Thunder	45	37	.549	22.0	82
10	Phoenix Suns	39	43	.476	28.0	82
11	Utah Jazz	38	44	.463	29.0	82
12	Denver Nuggets	30	52	.366	37.0	82
13	Sacramento Kings	29	53	.354	38.0	82
14	Los Angeles Lakers	21	61	.256	46.0	82
15	Minnesota Timberwolves	16	66	.195	51.0	82

=== Division ===
Southwest Division	W	L	PCT	GB	Home	Road	Div	GP
y-Houston Rockets	56	26	.683	–	30‍–‍11	26‍–‍15	8–8	82
x-Memphis Grizzlies	55	27	.671	1.0	31‍–‍10	24‍–‍17	9–7	82
x-San Antonio Spurs	55	27	.671	1.0	33‍–‍8	22‍–‍19	8–8	82
x-Dallas Mavericks	50	32	.610	6.0	27‍–‍14	23‍–‍18	7–9	82
x-New Orleans Pelicans	45	37	.549	11.0	28‍–‍13	17‍–‍24	8–8	82

== Game log ==
=== Preseason ===
The pre-season schedule was released on July 31.

2014 pre-season game log
Pre-season: 4–4 (home: 2–2; road: 2–2)

Game	Date	Team	Score	High points	High rebounds	High assists	Location Attendance	Record
1	October 7	Houston	L 108–111	Chandler Parsons (14)	Al-Farouq Aminu (11)	Monta Ellis (3)	American Airlines Center; 17,227	0–1
2	October 10	Oklahoma City	L 109–118	Al-Farouq Aminu; Jae Crowder (14)	Tyson Chandler; Chandler Parsons (6)	Devin Harris (8)	American Airlines Center; 18,397	0–2
3	October 12	Indiana	W 106–98	Dirk Nowitzki; Charlie Villanueva (16)	three players (7)	Jameer Nelson (10)	American Airlines Center; 17,971	1–2
4	October 17	@ Cleveland	W 108–102	Jameer Nelson; Chandler Parsons (19)	Dirk Nowitzki (9)	Monta Ellis (8)	Quicken Loans Arena; 20,562	2–2
5	October 18	@ Indiana	L 93–98	Richard Jefferson; Gal Mekel (19)	Al-Farouq Aminu (12)	Gal Mekel (9)	Bankers Life Fieldhouse; 15,748	2–3
6	October 20	Memphis	W 108–103	Tyson Chandler; Monta Ellis (14)	Tyson Chandler (8)	Jameer Nelson (6)	American Airlines Center; 16,402	3–3
7	October 23	@ New Orleans	L 85–88	Gal Mekel (17)	Bernard James (10)	Gal Mekel (8)	CenturyLink Center; 10,658	3–4
8	October 24	@ Orlando	W 117–92	Chandler Parsons (24)	Tyson Chandler (5)	Monta Ellis; Jameer Nelson (7)	Amway Center; 15,633	4–4

2014–15 season schedule

=== Regular season ===
The schedule was announced on August 13.

2014–15 game log
Total: 50–32 (home: 27–14; road: 23–18)
October: 1–1 (home: 1–0; road: 0–1)

Game	Date	Team	Score	High points	High rebounds	High assists	Location Attendance	Record
1	October 28	@ San Antonio	L 100–101	Monta Ellis (26)	Tyson Chandler (10)	Monta Ellis (6)	AT&T Center; 19,615	0–1
2	October 30	Utah	W 120–102	Dirk Nowitzki; Chandler Parsons (21)	Al-Farouq Aminu (10)	Monta Ellis (6)	American Airlines Center; 19,697	1–1

November : 12–4 (home: 6–2; road: 6–2)

Game	Date	Team	Score	High points	High rebounds	High assists	Location Attendance	Record
3	November 1	@ New Orleans	W 109–104	Chandler Parsons (20)	Tyson Chandler; Monta Ellis (10)	Devin Harris (6)	Smoothie King Center; 14,547	2–1
4	November 3	Boston	W 118–113	Chandler Parsons (29)	Tyson Chandler (12)	Monta Ellis; Devin Harris (6)	American Airlines Center; 19,948	3–1
5	November 6	@ Portland	L 87–108	Dirk Nowitzki (17)	four players (4)	Devin Harris (4)	Moda Center; 19,441	3–2
6	November 7	@ Utah	W 105–82	Dirk Nowitzki (27)	Tyson Chandler (13)	Monta Ellis; Devin Harris (6)	EnergySolutions Arena; 18,419	4–2
7	November 9	Miami	L 96–105	Monta Ellis (23)	Tyson Chandler (15)	Monta Ellis; Jameer Nelson (5)	American Airlines Center; 20,195	4–3
8	November 11	Sacramento	W 106–98	Dirk Nowitzki (23)	Tyson Chandler (11)	Devin Harris; Jameer Nelson (5)	American Airlines Center; 19,663	5–3
9	November 13	Philadelphia	W 123–70	Dirk Nowitzki (21)	Tyson Chandler (10)	José Juan Barea (11)	American Airlines Center; 19,604	6–3
10	November 15	Minnesota	W 131–117	Monta Ellis (30)	Tyson Chandler (16)	Jameer Nelson (6)	American Airlines Center; 19,730	7–3
11	November 17	@ Charlotte	W 107–80	Monta Ellis (18)	Al-Farouq Aminu (11)	Jameer Nelson (8)	Time Warner Cable Arena; 15,345	8–3
12	November 19	@ Washington	W 105–102	Monta Ellis (34)	Tyson Chandler (16)	José Juan Barea (6)	Verizon Center; 16,374	9–3
13	November 21	LA Lakers	W 140–106	Dirk Nowitzki (23)	Al-Farouq Aminu (6)	Monta Ellis (10)	American Airlines Center; 20,353	10–3
14	November 22	@ Houston	L 92–95	Monta Ellis (17)	Tyson Chandler (13)	Jameer Nelson (6)	Toyota Center; 20,353	10–4
15	November 24	Indiana	L 100–111	Monta Ellis (24)	Dirk Nowitzki (11)	Monta Ellis (6)	American Airlines Center; 19,850	10–5
16	November 26	New York	W 109–102 (OT)	Dirk Nowitzki (30)	Tyson Chandler (25)	Devin Harris (8)	American Airlines Center; 20,352	11–5
17	November 28	@ Toronto	W 106–102	Monta Ellis (30)	Tyson Chandler (10)	José Juan Barea (9)	Air Canada Centre; 19,800	12–5
18	November 29	@ Philadelphia	W 110–103	Tyson Chandler (20)	Tyson Chandler (13)	Monta Ellis (5)	Wells Fargo Center; 16,145	13–5

December : 10–5 (home: 6–3; road: 4–2)

Game	Date	Team	Score	High points	High rebounds	High assists	Location Attendance	Record
19	December 2	@ Chicago	W 132–129 (2OT)	Monta Ellis (38)	Tyson Chandler (14)	Dirk Nowitzki (10)	United Center; 22,042	14–5
20	December 3	@ Milwaukee	W 107–105	Monta Ellis (23)	Tyson Chandler (20)	Monta Ellis (7)	BMO Harris Bradley Center; 13,568	15–5
21	December 5	Phoenix	L 106–118	Monta Ellis (33)	Tyson Chandler (18)	José Juan Barea; Jameer Nelson (3)	American Airlines Center; 20,010	15–6
22	December 7	Milwaukee	W 125–102	Chandler Parsons (28)	Tyson Chandler; Brandan Wright (7)	José Juan Barea (9)	American Airlines Center; 19,413	16–6
23	December 9	@ Memphis	L 105–114	Chandler Parsons (30)	Tyson Chandler (9)	Jameer Nelson; Dirk Nowitzki (4)	FedExForum; 19,413	16–7
24	December 10	New Orleans	W 112–107	Monta Ellis (26)	Tyson Chandler; Dirk Nowitzki (6)	Monta Ellis (5)	American Airlines Center; 19,988	17–7
25	December 13	Golden State	L 98–105	Monta Ellis (24)	Tyson Chandler; Richard Jefferson (12)	Monta Ellis; Jameer Nelson (5)	American Airlines Center; 20,317	17–8
26	December 16	@ New York	W 107–87	Dirk Nowitzki (16)	Tyson Chandler (14)	Monta Ellis; Chandler Parsons (6)	Madison Square Garden; 19,812	18–8
27	December 17	@ Detroit	W 117–106	Chandler Parsons (32)	Dirk Nowitzki (10)	Devin Harris (9)	The Palace of Auburn Hills; 12,287	19–8
28	December 20	San Antonio	W 99–93	Monta Ellis (38)	Tyson Chandler (14)	Rajon Rondo (9)	American Airlines Center; 20,504	20–8
29	December 22	Atlanta	L 102–105	Monta Ellis (18)	Tyson Chandler (19)	Rajon Rondo (11)	American Airlines Center; 20,339	20–9
30	December 23	@ Phoenix	L 115–124	Tyson Chandler; Dirk Nowitzki (22)	Tyson Chandler (14)	Rajon Rondo (8)	US Airways Center; 18,055	20–10
31	December 26	LA Lakers	W 102–98	Rajon Rondo (21)	Tyson Chandler (12)	Monta Ellis; Rajon Rondo (7)	American Airlines Center; 20,424	21–10
32	December 28	Oklahoma City	W 112–107	Dirk Nowitzki (30)	Greg Smith (8)	Rajon Rondo (7)	American Airlines Center; 20,417	22–10
33	December 30	Washington	W 114–87	Monta Ellis (20)	Tyson Chandler (12)	José Juan Barea; Rajon Rondo (5)	American Airlines Center; 20,397	23–10

January : 9–7 (home: 1–3; road: 8–4)

Game	Date	Team	Score	High points	High rebounds	High assists	Location Attendance	Record
34	January 2	@ Boston	W 119–101	Rajon Rondo (29)	Tyson Chandler (16)	Rajon Rondo (5)	TD Garden; 18,624	24–10
35	January 4	@ Cleveland	W 109–90	Monta Ellis (20)	Tyson Chandler (8)	Rajon Rondo (8)	Quicken Loans Arena; 20,562	25–10
36	January 5	@ Brooklyn	W 96–88 (OT)	Monta Ellis (19)	Tyson Chandler (13)	Rajon Rondo (14)	Barclays Center; 17,732	26–10
37	January 7	Detroit	L 95–108	Dirk Nowitzki (19)	Tyson Chandler (15)	Rajon Rondo (8)	American Airlines Center; 20,279	26–11
38	January 10	@ LA Clippers	L 100–120	Dirk Nowitzki (25)	Tyson Chandler (10)	Rajon Rondo (8)	Staples Center; 19,060	26–12
39	January 13	@ Sacramento	W 108–104 (OT)	Monta Ellis (28)	Tyson Chandler (17)	Monta Ellis (10)	Sleep Train Arena; 15,747	27–12
40	January 14	@ Denver	L 107–114	José Juan Barea (17)	Richard Jefferson (6)	José Juan Barea (6)	Pepsi Center; 14,022	27–13
41	January 16	Denver	W 97–89	Dirk Nowitzki (25)	Tyson Chandler (16)	Rajon Rondo (8)	American Airlines Center; 20,337	28–13
42	January 19	@ Memphis	W 103–95	Monta Ellis (25)	Tyson Chandler (16)	Monta Ellis (7)	FedExForum; 18,119	29–13
43	January 21	@ Minnesota	W 98–75	Chandler Parsons (22)	Dwight Powell (10)	José Juan Barea (10)	Target Center; 13,737	30–13
44	January 23	Chicago	L 98–102	Dirk Nowitzki (24)	Tyson Chandler (12)	Monta Ellis; Rajon Rondo (4)	American Airlines Center; 20,408	30–14
45	January 25	@ New Orleans	L 106–109	Monta Ellis (36)	Rajon Rondo (8)	Rajon Rondo (9)	Smoothie King Center; 17,687	30–15
46	January 27	Memphis	L 90–109	Monta Ellis; Chandler Parsons (19)	Rajon Rondo (7)	Rajon Rondo (5)	American Airlines Center; 20,160	30–16
47	January 28	@ Houston	L 94–99	Monta Ellis (33)	Tyson Chandler (15)	Rajon Rondo (6)	Toyota Center; 18,237	30–17
48	January 30	@ Miami	W 93–72	Charlie Villanueva (20)	Tyson Chandler (13)	Monta Ellis (7)	American Airlines Arena; 19,823	31–17
49	January 31	@ Orlando	W 108–93	Monta Ellis (25)	Tyson Chandler (9)	Monta Ellis (13)	Amway Center; 17,626	32–17

February : 7–5 (home: 6–2; road: 1–3)

Game	Date	Team	Score	High points	High rebounds	High assists	Location Attendance	Record
50	February 2	Minnesota	W 100–94	Monta Ellis (23)	Tyson Chandler (10)	José Juan Barea (8)	American Airlines Center; 19,989	33–17
51	February 4	@ Golden State	L 114–128	Chandler Parsons (24)	Tyson Chandler (17)	Devin Harris (7)	Oracle Arena; 19,596	33–18
52	February 5	@ Sacramento	W 101–78	Monta Ellis (21)	Tyson Chandler (16)	Monta Ellis (6)	Sleep Train Arena; 16,993	34–18
53	February 7	Portland	W 111–101 (OT)	Dirk Nowitzki (25)	Tyson Chandler (13)	José Juan Barea (7)	American Airlines Center; 20,398	35–18
54	February 9	LA Clippers	L 98–115	Charlie Villanueva (26)	Chandler Parsons (12)	José Juan Barea (7)	American Airlines Center; 20,082	35–19
55	February 11	Utah	W 87–82	José Juan Barea (22)	Dirk Nowitzki (14)	Devin Harris (6)	American Airlines Center; 19,947	36–19
All-Star Break
56	February 19	@ Oklahoma City	L 89–104	Dirk Nowitzki (14)	Tyson Chandler (13)	Rajon Rondo (6)	Chesapeake Energy Arena; 18,203	36–20
57	February 20	Houston	W 111–100	Al-Farouq Aminu; Devin Harris (17)	Tyson Chandler (14)	Devin Harris (7)	American Airlines Center; 20,389	37–20
58	February 22	Charlotte	W 92–81	Monta Ellis (23)	Dirk Nowitzki (12)	four players (4)	American Airlines Center; 20,347	38–20
59	February 24	Toronto	W 99–92	Monta Ellis (20)	Al-Farouq Aminu (12)	Devin Harris (5)	American Airlines Center; 20,151	39–20
60	February 25	@ Atlanta	L 87–104	Monta Ellis (19)	Bernard James (11)	José Juan Barea (7)	Philips Arena; 16,126	39–21
61	February 28	Brooklyn	L 94–104	Dirk Nowitzki (20)	Rajon Rondo (7)	Rajon Rondo (6)	American Airlines Center; 20,367	39–22

March : 6–7 (home: 5–2; road: 1–5)

Game	Date	Team	Score	High points	High rebounds	High assists	Location Attendance	Record
62	March 2	New Orleans	W 102–93	Monta Ellis (20)	Dirk Nowitzki (8)	four players (2)	American Airlines Center; 20,367	40–22
63	March 5	@ Portland	L 75–94	Monta Ellis; Amar'e Stoudemire (12)	Tyson Chandler (14)	Rajon Rondo (9)	Moda Center; 19,499	40–23
64	March 6	@ Golden State	L 89–104	Dirk Nowitzki; Rajon Rondo (14)	three players (5)	Rajon Rondo (6)	Oracle Arena; 19,596	40–24
65	March 8	@ LA Lakers	W 100–93	Monta Ellis (31)	Tyson Chandler; Chandler Parsons (6)	Rajon Rondo (9)	Staples Center; 18,997	41–24
66	March 10	Cleveland	L 94–127	Chandler Parsons (18)	Tyson Chandler (10)	José Juan Barea (5)	American Airlines Center; 20,501	41–25
67	March 13	LA Clippers	W 129–99	Chandler Parsons (22)	Tyson Chandler (12)	Rajon Rondo (7)	American Airlines Center; 20,444	42–25
68	March 16	Oklahoma City	W 119–115	Chandler Parsons (31)	Tyson Chandler (7)	Rajon Rondo (13)	American Airlines Center; 20,231	43–25
69	March 18	Orlando	W 107–102	Dirk Nowitzki (25)	three players (8)	Rajon Rondo (11)	American Airlines Center; 20,294	44–25
70	March 20	Memphis	L 101–112	Devin Harris; Dirk Nowitzki (16)	Tyson Chandler (13)	Rajon Rondo (4)	American Airlines Center; 20,399	44–26
71	March 22	@ Phoenix	L 92–98	Chandler Parsons (19)	Tyson Chandler (11)	Rajon Rondo (6)	US Airways Center; 17,435	44–27
72	March 24	San Antonio	W 101–94	Monta Ellis (38)	Dirk Nowitzki (13)	Monta Ellis; Rajon Rondo (5)	American Airlines Center; 20,328	45–27
73	March 27	@ San Antonio	L 76–94	Tyson Chandler; Monta Ellis (10)	Tyson Chandler (14)	Rajon Rondo (5)	AT&T Center; 18,581	45–28
74	March 29	@ Indiana	L 99–104	Chandler Parsons (27)	Tyson Chandler (11)	Rajon Rondo (10)	Bankers Life Fieldhouse; 17,358	45–29

April : 5–3 (home: 2–2; road: 3–1)

Game	Date	Team	Score	High points	High rebounds	High assists	Location Attendance	Record
75	April 1	@ Oklahoma City	W 135–131	Monta Ellis (26)	Tyson Chandler (10)	Rajon Rondo (10)	Chesapeake Energy Arena; 18,203	46–29
76	April 2	Houston	L 101–108	Dirk Nowitzki (21)	Tyson Chandler (8)	Rajon Rondo (6)	American Airlines Center; 20,062	46–30
77	April 4	Golden State	L 110–123	Dirk Nowitzki (18)	Tyson Chandler (13)	Rajon Rondo (5)	American Airlines Center; 20,407	46–31
78	April 8	Phoenix	W 107–104	Monta Ellis (20)	Tyson Chandler (23)	Rajon Rondo (7)	American Airlines Center; 20,262	47–31
79	April 10	@ Denver	W 144–143 (2OT)	Dirk Nowitzki (25)	Tyson Chandler (11)	José Juan Barea; Devin Harris (9)	Pepsi Center; 14,041	48–31
80	April 12	@ LA Lakers	W 120–106	Tyson Chandler (20)	Al-Farouq Aminu (10)	Rajon Rondo (11)	Staples Center; 18,071	49–31
81	April 13	@ Utah	L 92–109	José Juan Barea (18)	Al-Farouq Aminu (10)	Raymond Felton; Rajon Rondo (5)	EnergySolutions Arena; 19,911	49–32
82	April 15	Portland	W 114–98	Tyson Chandler (22)	Tyson Chandler (15)	Rajon Rondo (7)	American Airlines Center; 20,352	50–32

2014–15 season schedule

=== Playoffs ===
2014 playoff game log
Total: 1–4 (home: 1–1; road: 0–3)
First Round: 1–4 (home: 1–1; road: 0–3)

Game	Date	Team	Score	High points	High rebounds	High assists	Location Attendance	Series
1	April 18	@ Houston	L 108–118	Dirk Nowitzki (24)	Tyson Chandler (18)	Rajon Rondo (5)	Toyota Center; 18,231	0–1
2	April 21	@ Houston	L 99–111	Monta Ellis (24)	Dirk Nowitzki (13)	Ellis, Felton (3)	Toyota Center; 18,243	0–2
3	April 24	Houston	L 128–130	Ellis, Nowitzki (34)	Chandler, Nowitzki (8)	Ellis, Barea (9)	American Airlines Center; 20,651	0–3
4	April 26	Houston	W 121–109	Monta Ellis (31)	Tyson Chandler (14)	J. J. Barea (10)	American Airlines Center; 20,589	1–3
5	April 28	@ Houston	L 94–103	Monta Ellis (25)	Dirk Nowitzki (14)	J. J. Barea (9)	Toyota Center; 18,231	1–4

2015 playoff schedule

== Player statistics ==
=== Ragular season ===
Player	POS	GP	GS	MP	REB	AST	STL	BLK	PTS	MPG	RPG	APG	SPG	BPG	PPG
Monta Ellis	SG	80	80	2,699	190	329	148	25	1,513	33.7	2.4	4.1	1.9	.3	18.9
Dirk Nowitzki	PF	77	77	2,282	457	143	39	33	1,333	29.6	5.9	1.9	.5	.4	17.3
J. J. Barea	PG	77	10	1,362	134	263	33	1	580	17.7	1.7	3.4	.4	.0	7.5
Devin Harris	PG	76	3	1,685	135	237	78	14	665	22.2	1.8	3.1	1.0	.2	8.8
Tyson Chandler	C	75	75	2,286	864	84	42	91	771	30.5	11.5	1.1	.6	1.2	10.3
Richard Jefferson	SF	74	18	1,244	183	61	32	11	432	16.8	2.5	.8	.4	.1	5.8
Al-Farouq Aminu	SF	74	3	1,366	342	59	70	62	412	18.5	4.6	.8	.9	.8	5.6
Chandler Parsons	SF	66	66	2,186	323	161	69	19	1,037	33.1	4.9	2.4	1.0	.3	15.7
Charlie Villanueva	PF	64	1	678	149	19	15	22	403	10.6	2.3	.3	.2	.3	6.3
Rajon Rondo^{†}	PG	46	46	1,319	208	301	54	4	426	28.7	4.5	6.5	1.2	.1	9.3
Greg Smith	PF	42	2	363	79	9	7	11	80	8.6	1.9	.2	.2	.3	1.9
Raymond Felton	PG	29	3	281	26	41	11	4	108	9.7	.9	1.4	.4	.1	3.7
Brandan Wright^{†}	PF	27	0	505	110	10	17	42	238	18.7	4.1	.4	.6	1.6	8.8
Jae Crowder^{†}	SF	25	0	265	29	12	15	5	89	10.6	1.2	.5	.6	.2	3.6
Dwight Powell^{†}	PF	24	0	227	49	9	7	6	81	9.5	2.0	.4	.3	.3	3.4
Jameer Nelson^{†}	PG	23	23	584	63	95	15	2	167	25.4	2.7	4.1	.7	.1	7.3
Amar'e Stoudemire^{†}	PF	23	1	380	84	8	9	4	248	16.5	3.7	.3	.4	.2	10.8
Bernard James	C	16	2	158	39	4	2	15	44	9.9	2.4	.3	.1	.9	2.8
Ricky Ledo^{†}	SG	5	0	11	2	1	0	0	1	2.2	.4	.2	.0	.0	.2

- ^{†} Denotes player spent time with another team in the season. Stats reflect time with the Mavericks only.

=== Playoffs ===
Player	POS	GP	GS	MP	REB	AST	STL	BLK	PTS	MPG	RPG	APG	SPG	BPG	PPG
Monta Ellis	SG	5	5	197	16	26	10	3	130	39.4	3.2	5.2	2.0	.6	26.0
Dirk Nowitzki	PF	5	5	181	52	12	2	2	106	36.2	10.4	2.4	.4	.4	21.2
Tyson Chandler	C	5	5	160	54	1	3	6	51	32.0	10.8	.2	.6	1.2	10.2
J. J. Barea	PG	5	2	154	24	37	4	0	59	30.8	4.8	7.4	.8	.0	11.8
Al-Farouq Aminu	SF	5	2	150	36	6	10	8	56	30.0	7.2	1.2	2.0	1.6	11.2
Amar'e Stoudemire	PF	5	0	75	16	3	1	3	39	15.0	3.2	.6	.2	.6	7.8
Charlie Villanueva	PF	5	0	43	13	3	1	1	30	8.6	2.6	.6	.2	.2	6.0
Richard Jefferson	SF	4	2	51	2	1	2	0	15	12.8	.5	.3	.5	.0	3.8
Devin Harris	PG	4	0	74	8	4	2	0	24	18.5	2.0	1.0	.5	.0	6.0
Raymond Felton	PG	3	1	36	7	4	0	0	11	12.0	2.3	1.3	.0	.0	3.7
Rajon Rondo	PG	2	2	37	2	6	0	0	19	18.5	1.0	3.0	.0	.0	9.5
Dwight Powell	PF	2	0	3	1	1	0	0	0	1.5	.5	.5	.0	.0	.0
Chandler Parsons	SF	1	1	37	6	2	0	0	10	37.0	6.0	2.0	.0	.0	10.0
Bernard James	C	1	0	2	0	0	0	0	0	2.0	.0	.0	.0	.0	.0
Greg Smith	PF	1	0	1	0	0	0	0	0	1.0	.0	.0	.0	.0	.0

== Injuries ==
Player	Duration		Injury type	Games missed
Player	Start	End	Injury type	Games missed
Raymond Felton	October 28, 2014	December 28, 2014	Sprained right ankle	31
Devin Harris	November 17, 2014	November 22, 2014	Soreness in his lower right leg	2
Jameer Nelson	November 26, 2014	December 2, 2014	Back spasms	3
Jameer Nelson	December 10, 2014	December 13, 2014	Jammed right shoulder	1
Chandler Parsons	December 13, 2014	December 16, 2014	Sore lower back	1
Tyson Chandler	December 28, 2014	December 30, 2014	Back spasms	1
Chandler Parsons	January 30, 2015	February 2, 2015	Stomach flu	2
Rajon Rondo	January 31, 2015	February 19, 2015	Left eye orbital and nasal fracture	6
Devin Harris	February 2, 2015	February 4, 2015	Knee and ankle injury	0
Tyson Chandler	February 9, 2015	February 19, 2015	Sprained left ankle	1
Monta Ellis	February 9, 2015	February 11, 2015	Left hip injury	0
Chandler Parsons	February 20, 2015	March 8, 2015	Sprained left ankle	7
Tyson Chandler	February 25, 2015	March 5, 2015	Left hip injury	3
Devin Harris	March 5, 2015	March 10, 2015	Right hand injury	2
Al-Farouq Aminu	March 13, 2015	March 18, 2015	Sore left shoulder	2
Devin Harris	March 16, 2015	March 18, 2015	Illness	0
José Juan Barea	March 21, 2015	April 1, 2015	Sprained left ankle	4
Devin Harris	March 22, 2015	March 24, 2015	Illness	0
Richard Jefferson	March 24, 2015	March 27, 2015	Back spasms	0
Monta Ellis	March 27, 2015	April 1, 2015	Right calf injury	1
Chandler Parsons	April 2, 2015	April 18, 2015	Right knee soreness	6
Devin Harris	April 12, 2015	April 18, 2015	Left big toe injury	1
Chandler Parsons	April 18, 2015		Right knee injury	Out for season
Devin Harris	April 21, 2015	April 24, 2015	Left big toe injury	1
Rajon Rondo	April 21, 2015		Back injury	Out for season

== Milestones ==
- Dirk Nowitzki passed Hakeem Olajuwon on November 11, 2014, heading into ninth place on the all-time scoring list.
- Nowitzki scored his 27,000th point for one franchise on November 17, 2014.
- Nowitzki passed Elvin Hayes on December 26, 2014, heading into eighth place on the all-time scoring list.
- Nowitzki passed Moses Malone on January 5, 2015, heading into seventh place on the all-time scoring list.
- Nowitzki recorded his 10,000th career rebound on March 24, 2015.
- Nowitzki scored his 28,000th career point on April 1, 2015.

== Awards ==
Recipient	Award(s)
Dirk Nowitzki	All-Star

== Transactions ==
=== Overview ===
Players Added

Via trade

- Tyson Chandler
- Raymond Felton
- Rajon Rondo
- Dwight Powell
- Greg Smith

Via free agency

- Al-Farouq Aminu
- J. J. Barea
- Chandler Parsons
- Richard Jefferson
- Jameer Nelson
- Charlie Villanueva
Players Lost

Via trade

- DeJuan Blair
- Jose Calderon
- Jae Crowder
- Samuel Dalembert
- Wayne Ellington
- Shane Larkin
- Jameer Nelson
- Brandan Wright

Via free agency

- Vince Carter
- Shawn Marion

Waived

- Gal Mekel

=== Trades ===
June 25, 2014	To Dallas Mavericks Tyson Chandler; Raymond Felton	To New York Knicks José Calderón; Samuel Dalembert; Wayne Ellington; Shane Larkin; 2014 34th and 51st draft pick
July 14, 2014	To Dallas Mavericks Greg Smith	To Chicago Bulls Rights to Tadija Dragićević
July 16, 2014	To Dallas Mavericks Rights to Emir Preldžić	To Washington Wizards DeJuan Blair
December 18, 2014	To Dallas Mavericks Dwight Powell; Rajon Rondo	To Boston Celtics Jae Crowder; Jameer Nelson; Brandan Wright; 2015 first-round and 2016 second-round draft pick

=== Free agents ===
==== Additions ====
Player	Signed	Former Team
Dirk Nowitzki	Signed 3-year contract worth $25 million	Dallas Mavericks
Devin Harris	Signed 4-year contract worth $16.5 million	Dallas Mavericks
Chandler Parsons	Signed 3-year contract worth $46 million	Houston Rockets
Richard Jefferson	Signed 1-year contract worth the veteran minimum	Utah Jazz
Rashard Lewis	Signed 1-year contract worth the veteran minimum	Miami Heat
Eric Griffin	Signed 1-year nonguaranteed contract	Guaros de Lara
Al-Farouq Aminu	Signed 2-year contract worth the veteran minimum	New Orleans Pelicans
Jameer Nelson	Signed 2-year contract worth $6 million	Orlando Magic
Ivan Johnson	Signed 2-year partially guaranteed contract	Zhejiang Golden Bulls
Bernard James	Signed 1-year contract worth the veteran minimum	Dallas Mavericks
Charlie Villanueva	Signed 1-year contract worth the veteran minimum	Detroit Pistons
Doron Lamb		Orlando Magic
Yuki Togashi		Akita Northern Happinets
José Juan Barea		Minnesota Timberwolves
Bernard James	Signed 1-year contract worth the veteran minimum	Shanghai Sharks
Amar'e Stoudemire	Signed 1-year contract worth the veteran minimum	New York Knicks

==== Subtractions ====
Player	Reason Left	New Team
Vince Carter	Signed 3-year contract worth $12.2 million	Memphis Grizzlies
Rashard Lewis	Contract voided	
Shawn Marion	Signed 1-year contract worth the veteran minimum	Cleveland Cavaliers
Eric Griffin	Waived	Texas Legends
Yuki Togashi	Waived	Texas Legends
Bernard James	Waived	Texas Legends
Ivan Johnson	Waived	Texas Legends
Doron Lamb	Waived	Texas Legends
Gal Mekel	Waived	New Orleans Pelicans
Ricky Ledo	Waived	Texas Legends
