= 2014–15 Denver Nuggets season =

NBA professional basketball team season

- Head coach: Brian Shaw (fired on March 3); Melvin Hunt (interim)
- Arena: Pepsi Center

Results
- Record: 30–52 (.366)
- Place: Division: 4th (Northwest); Conference: 12th (Western)
- Playoff finish: Did not qualify
- Stats at Basketball Reference

Local media
- Television: Altitude Sports and Entertainment
- Radio: KCKK

The 2014–15 Denver Nuggets season was the franchise's 39th season in the National Basketball Association (NBA). The Nuggets were eliminated from postseason contention for the second season in a row on March 20, 2015, following a loss to the Miami Heat.

== Preseason ==
=== Draft picks ===
Round	Pick	Player	Position	Nationality	School/Club team
1	11	Doug McDermott	SF	United States	Creighton
2	41	Nikola Jokić	PF	Serbia	Mega Vizura (Serbia)
2	56	Roy Devyn Marble	SG/SF	United States	Iowa

== Regular season ==
=== Standings ===
Northwest Division	W	L	PCT	GB	Home	Road	Div	GP
y-Portland Trail Blazers	51	31	.622	–	32‍–‍9	19‍–‍22	11–5	82
Oklahoma City Thunder	45	37	.549	6.0	29‍–‍12	16‍–‍25	10–6	82
Utah Jazz	38	44	.463	13.0	21‍–‍20	17‍–‍24	9–7	82
Denver Nuggets	30	52	.366	21.0	19‍–‍22	11‍–‍30	6–10	82
Minnesota Timberwolves	16	66	.195	35.0	9‍–‍32	7‍–‍34	4–12	82

Western Conference
#	Team	W	L	PCT	GB	GP
1	z-Golden State Warriors *	67	15	.817	–	82
2	y-Houston Rockets *	56	26	.683	11.0	82
3	x-Los Angeles Clippers	56	26	.683	11.0	82
4	y-Portland Trail Blazers *	51	31	.622	16.0	82
5	x-Memphis Grizzlies	55	27	.671	12.0	82
6	x-San Antonio Spurs	55	27	.671	12.0	82
7	x-Dallas Mavericks	50	32	.610	17.0	82
8	x-New Orleans Pelicans	45	37	.549	22.0	82
9	Oklahoma City Thunder	45	37	.549	22.0	82
10	Phoenix Suns	39	43	.476	28.0	82
11	Utah Jazz	38	44	.463	29.0	82
12	Denver Nuggets	30	52	.366	37.0	82
13	Sacramento Kings	29	53	.354	38.0	82
14	Los Angeles Lakers	21	61	.256	46.0	82
15	Minnesota Timberwolves	16	66	.195	51.0	82

== Game log ==
2014–15 game log
Total: 30–52 (Home: 19–22; Road: 11–30)
October: 1–0 (home: 1–0; road: 0–0)

Game	Date	Team	Score	High points	High rebounds	High assists	Location Attendance	Record
1	October 29	Detroit	W 89–79	Kenneth Faried (22)	Kenneth Faried (17)	Ty Lawson (5)	Pepsi Center; 17,136	1–0

November: 7–8 (home: 4–3; road: 3–5)

Game	Date	Team	Score	High points	High rebounds	High assists	Location Attendance	Record
2	November 1	@ Oklahoma City	L 91–102	Ty Lawson (25)	Wilson Chandler (7)	Ty Lawson (5)	Chesapeake Energy Arena; 18,203	1–1
3	November 3	Sacramento	L 105–110	Arron Afflalo (16)	Kenneth Faried (10)	Ty Lawson (12)	Pepsi Center; 12,516	1–2
4	November 5	@ Sacramento	L 109–131	Randy Foye (19)	K. Faried & J. Nurkić (5)	Ty Lawson (9)	Sleep Train Arena; 14,539	1–3
5	November 7	Cleveland	L 101–110	Randy Foye (28)	Wilson Chandler (10)	Randy Foye (9)	Pepsi Center; 19,623	1–4
6	November 9	@ Portland	L 100–116	Kenneth Faried (19)	Timofey Mozgov (16)	Ty Lawson (8)	Moda Center; 19,411	1–5
7	November 12	Portland	L 113–130	Ty Lawson (32)	J.J. Hickson (11)	Ty Lawson (6)	Pepsi Center; 12,611	1–6
8	November 14	@ Indiana	W 108–87	Arron Afflalo (17)	K. Faried & T. Mozgov (6)	Ty Lawson (10)	Bankers Life Fieldhouse; 16,286	2–6
9	November 16	@ New York	L 93–109	Arron Afflalo (18)	Kenneth Faried (9)	Ty Lawson (9)	Madison Square Garden; 19,812	2–7
10	November 17	@ Cleveland	W 106–97	Ty Lawson (24)	D. Arthur & T. Mozgov (11)	Ty Lawson (12)	Quicken Loans Arena; 20,562	3–7
11	November 19	Oklahoma City	W 107–100	Wilson Chandler (21)	Kenneth Faried (10)	Ty Lawson (15)	Pepsi Center; 14,140	4–7
12	November 21	New Orleans	W 117–97	K. Faried & A. Afflalo (19)	K. Faried & J. McGee (8)	Ty Lawson (15)	Pepsi Center; 15,232	5–7
13	November 23	@ LA Lakers	W 101–94 (OT)	Wilson Chandler (19)	Timofey Mozgov (13)	Ty Lawson (16)	Staples Center; 18,997	6–7
14	November 25	Chicago	W 114–109	Ty Lawson (20)	K. Faried & T. Mozgov (9)	Ty Lawson (12)	Pepsi Center; 17,033	7–7
15	November 26	@ Phoenix	L 112–120	Wilson Chandler (19)	Timofey Mozgov (13)	Ty Lawson (12)	Talking Stick Resort Arena; 16,099	7–8
16	November 28	Phoenix	W 122–97	Arron Afflalo (22)	J.J. Hickson (11)	Ty Lawson (10)	Pepsi Center; 15,509	8–8

December: 5–11 (home: 4–5; road: 1–6)

Game	Date	Team	Score	High points	High rebounds	High assists	Location Attendance	Record
17	December 1	@ Utah	W 103–101	T. Lawson & W. Chandler (15)	Timofey Mozgov (10)	Ty Lawson (12)	EnergySolutions Arena; 16,768	9–8
18	December 2	Portland	L 103–105	Ty Lawson (24)	Wilson Chandler (10)	Ty Lawson (13)	Pepsi Center; 12,822	9–9
19	December 5	@ Washington	L 89–119	Wilson Chandler (20)	J.J. Hickson & T. Mozgov (6)	Ty Lawson (10)	Verizon Center; 19,451	9–10
20	December 7	@ Atlanta	L 84–96	Wilson Chandler (29)	Timofey Mozgov (11)	Ty Lawson (10)	Philips Arena; 12,143	9–11
21	December 8	@ Toronto	L 107–112 (OT)	Arron Afflalo (25)	Darrell Arthur (13)	Ty Lawson (10)	Air Canada Centre; 19,800	9–12
22	December 10	Miami	W 102–82	Wilson Chandler (17)	Timofey Mozgov (10)	Ty Lawson (9)	Pepsi Center; 13,433	10–12
23	December 13	@ Houston	L 96–108	Darrell Arthur (20)	J.J. Hickson (10)	Ty Lawson (12)	Toyota Center; 18,136	10–13
24	December 14	San Antonio	L 91–99	Arron Afflalo (31)	Timofey Mozgov (13)	Ty Lawson (10)	Pepsi Center; 16,544	10–14
25	December 17	Houston	L 111–115 (OT)	Wilson Chandler (23)	Kenneth Faried (11)	Ty Lawson (16)	Pepsi Center; 12,107	10–15
26	December 19	LA Clippers	W 109–106	Nate Robinson (20)	Timofey Mozgov (8)	Ty Lawson (14)	Pepsi Center; 15,030	11–15
27	December 20	Indiana	W 76–73	Danilo Gallinari (19)	Timofey Mozgov (15)	Ty Lawson (10)	Pepsi Center; 14,125	12–15
28	December 22	@ Charlotte	L 82–110	Ty Lawson (18)	Kenneth Faried (9)	Ty Lawson (4)	Time Warner Cable Arena; 16,913	12–16
29	December 23	@ Brooklyn	L 96–102	Ty Lawson (29)	Kenneth Faried (14)	Ty Lawson (9)	Barclays Center; 17,080	12–17
30	December 26	Minnesota	W 106–102	Kenneth Faried (26)	Kenneth Faried (25)	Ty Lawson (11)	Pepsi Center; 14,516	13–17
31	December 28	Toronto	L 102–116	Ty Lawson (25)	Kenneth Faried (16)	Ty Lawson (7)	Pepsi Center; 14,216	13–18
32	December 30	LA Lakers	L 103–111	T. Lawson & J. Nurkic (16)	T. Mozgov & J. Nurkic (8)	Ty Lawson (9)	Pepsi Center; 17,248	13–19

January: 6–10 (home: 3–5; road: 3–5)

Game	Date	Team	Score	High points	High rebounds	High assists	Location Attendance	Record
33	January 1	@ Chicago	L 101–106	Wilson Chandler (22)	Kenneth Faried (19)	Ty Lawson (7)	United Center; 21,794	13–20
34	January 3	Memphis	W 114–85	Ty Lawson (25)	Kenneth Faried (13)	Ty Lawson (11)	Pepsi Center; 16,350	14–20
35	January 5	@ Minnesota	W 110–101	Arron Afflalo (34)	J.J. Hickson (11)	Ty Lawson (12)	Target Center; 10,386	15–20
36	January 7	Orlando	W 93–90	Ty Lawson (23)	Kenneth Faried (12)	Nate Robinson (7)	Pepsi Center; 13,513	16–20
37	January 9	@ Sacramento	W 118–108	T. Lawson & A. Afflalo (22)	Kenneth Faried (13)	Ty Lawson (8)	Sleep Train Arena; 16,029	17–20
38	January 14	Dallas	W 114–107	Ty Lawson (29)	Kenneth Faried (14)	Ty Lawson (12)	Pepsi Center; 14,022	18–20
39	January 16	@ Dallas	L 89–97	Arron Afflalo (16)	J.J. Hickson (14)	Ty Lawson (12)	American Airlines Center; 20,337	18–21
40	January 17	Minnesota	L 105–113	Ty Lawson (22)	J.J. Hickson (10)	Ty Lawson (7)	Pepsi Center; 14,821	18–22
41	January 19	@ Golden State	L 79–122	Ty Lawson (19)	Kenneth Faried (9)	Ty Lawson (6)	Oracle Arena; 19,596	18–23
42	January 20	San Antonio	L 99–109	Kenneth Faried (26)	Kenneth Faried (14)	Ty Lawson (8)	Pepsi Center; 14,434	18–24
43	January 23	Boston	L 99–100	Jameer Nelson (23)	Kenneth Faried (14)	Jameer Nelson (7)	Pepsi Center; 16,133	18–25
44	January 25	Washington	L 115–117 (OT)	Ty Lawson (31)	Kenneth Faried (11)	Ty Lawson (12)	Pepsi Center; 15,410	18–26
45	January 26	@ L.A. Clippers	L 98–102	Ty Lawson (31)	K. Faried & W. Chandler (10)	Ty Lawson (12)	Staples Center; 19,060	18–27
46	January 28	@ New Orleans	W 93–85	Arron Afflalo (20)	Jusuf Nurkic (9)	Ty Lawson (12)	Smoothie King Center; 16,055	19–27
47	January 29	@ Memphis	L 69–99	K. Faried & W. Chandler (10)	Kenneth Faried (7)	Ty Lawson (6)	FedExForum; 16,736	19–28
48	January 31	Charlotte	L 86–104	Danilo Gallinari (15)	J.J. Hickson & W. Chandler (8)	Ty Lawson (9)	Pepsi Center; 13,302	19–29

February: 1–9 (home: 0–4; road: 1–5)

Game	Date	Team	Score	High points	High rebounds	High assists	Location Attendance	Record
49	February 3	@ Philadelphia	L 98–105	Danilo Gallinari (15)	Ty Lawson & W. Chandler (6)	Ty Lawson (14)	Wells Fargo Center; 10,290	19–30
50	February 4	@ Boston	L 100–104	Ty Lawson (23)	Kenneth Faried (11)	Ty Lawson (8)	TD Garden; 15,126	19–31
51	February 6	@ Detroit	L 88–98	Ty Lawson (20)	Jusuf Nurkic (13)	Ty Lawson (9)	The Palace of Auburn Hills; 17,035	19–32
52	February 9	Oklahoma City	L 114–124	Wilson Chandler (23)	Jusuf Nurkic (14)	Ty Lawson (9)	Pepsi Center; 16,511	19–33
53	February 10	@ L.A. Lakers	W 106–96	Ty Lawson (32)	J.J. Hickson (7)	Ty Lawson (16)	STAPLES Center; 18,466	20–33
All-Star Break
54	February 20	@ Milwaukee	L 81–89	Wilson Chandler (19)	Jusuf Nurkic (15)	Ty Lawson (7)	BMO Harris Bradley Center; 16,110	20–34
55	February 22	@ Oklahoma City	L 94–119	Ty Lawson (17)	J. Nurkic & K. Faried (7)	Jameer Nelson (5)	Chesapeake Energy Arena; 18,203	20–35
56	February 23	Brooklyn	L 82–110	Danilo Gallinari (22)	Jusuf Nurkic (10)	Ty Lawson (10)	Pepsi Center; 13,127	20–36
57	February 25	Phoenix	L 96–110	Will Barton (22)	Joffrey Lauvergne (9)	Ty Lawson (7)	Pepsi Center; 12,813	20–37
58	February 27	Utah	L 82–104	Will Barton (22)	K. Faried & W. Chandler (8)	Ty Lawson (6)	Pepsi Center; 15,002	20–38

March: 8–8 (home: 5–3; road: 3–5)

Game	Date	Team	Score	High points	High rebounds	High assists	Location Attendance	Record
59	March 1	New Orleans	L 92–99	Danilo Gallinari (21)	J.J. Hickson & Will Barton (10)	Ty Lawson (11)	Pepsi Center; 13,109	20–39
60	March 3	Milwaukee	W 106–95	Danilo Gallinari (26)	Kenneth Faried (14)	Ty Lawson (10)	Pepsi Center; 12,234	21–39
61	March 4	@ Minnesota	W 100–85	Will Barton (17)	Kenneth Faried (14)	Ty Lawson & Jameer Nelson (9)	Target Center; 13,848	22–39
62	March 6	@ San Antonio	L 112–120	Ty Lawson (23)	Kenneth Faried (10)	Ty Lawson (9)	AT&T Center; 18,581	22–40
63	March 7	Houston	L 100–114	Wilson Chandler (26)	J.J. Hickson (10)	Ty Lawson (10)	Pepsi Center; 15,231	22–41
64	March 9	New York	W 106–78	Kenneth Faried (19)	Kenneth Faried (11)	Ty Lawson (6)	Pepsi Center; 14,153	23–41
65	March 11	Atlanta	W 115–102	Danilo Gallinari (23)	J.J. Hickson (9)	Ty Lawson (9)	Pepsi Center; 13,217	24–41
66	March 13	Golden State	W 114–103	Danilo Gallinari & Kenneth Faried (24)	Kenneth Faried (17)	Randy Foye (8)	Pepsi Center; 19,155	25–41
67	March 15	@ New Orleans	W 118–111 (2OT)	Will Barton (25)	Kenneth Faried (10)	Ty Lawson (9)	Smoothie King Center; 17,248	26–41
68	March 16	@ Memphis	L 81–92	Jameer Nelson (24)	Wilson Chandler (8)	Will Barton (4)	FedExForum; 17,248	26–42
69	March 19	@ Houston	L 108–118	Danilo Gallinari & Randy Foye (23)	Kenneth Faried (12)	Ty Lawson (10)	Toyota Center; 18,456	26–43
70	March 20	@ Miami	L 91–108	Kenneth Faried (20)	J. Nurkic & W. Chandler (7)	Ty Lawson (12)	AmericanAirlines Arena; 19,710	26–44
71	March 22	@ Orlando	W 119–100	Danilo Gallinari (40)	J.J. Hickson (8)	Ty Lawson (8)	Amway Center; 15,788	27–44
72	March 25	Philadelphia	L 85–99	Ty Lawson (19)	Wilson Chandler (11)	Ty Lawson (6)	Pepsi Center; 14,068	27–45
73	March 27	Utah	W 107–91	Ty Lawson & Jameer Nelson (18)	Will Barton (10)	Ty Lawson (9)	Pepsi Center; 15,312	28–45
74	March 28	@ Portland	L 114–120	Jameer Nelson (22)	Kenneth Faried (10)	Ty Lawson (7)	Moda Center; 19,769	28–46

April: 2–6 (home: 2–2; road: 0–4)

Game	Date	Team	Score	High points	High rebounds	High assists	Location Attendance	Record
75	April 1	@ Utah	L 84–98	Kenneth Faried (19)	Kenneth Faried (10)	Ty Lawson (3)	EnergySolutions Arena; 18,275	28–47
76	April 3	@ San Antonio	L 93–123	Danilo Gallinari (20)	Jusuf Nurkic (9)	Ty Lawson (7)	AT&T Center; 18,581	28–48
77	April 4	L.A. Clippers	L 92–107	Wilson Chandler (17)	Kenneth Faried (14)	Randy Foye (5)	Pepsi Center; 15,566	28–49
78	April 8	L.A. Lakers	W 119–101	Kenneth Faried (29)	Kenneth Faried (11)	Ty Lawson (8)	Pepsi Center; 13,338	29–49
79	April 10	Dallas	L 143–144 (2OT)	Danilo Gallinari (47)	Wilson Chandler (11)	Ty Lawson (18)	Pepsi Center; 14,041	29–50
80	April 12	Sacramento	W 122–111	Kenneth Faried (30)	Jusuf Nurkic & Wilson Chandler (9)	Ty Lawson (11)	Pepsi Center; 14,004	30–50
81	April 13	@ L.A. Clippers	L 103–110	Wilson Chandler (32)	Kenneth Faried (17)	Randy Foye (8)	Staples Center; 19,060	30–51
82	April 15	@ Golden State	L 126–133	Wilson Chandler & Danilo Gallinari (18)	Jusuf Nurkic (9)	Ty Lawson (8)	Oracle Arena; 19,596	30–52

2014–15 season schedule

== Player statistics ==
Legend
GP	Games played	GS	Games started	MPG	Minutes per game
FG%	Field-goal percentage	3P%	3-point field-goal percentage	FT%	Free-throw percentage
RPG	Rebounds per game	APG	Assists per game	SPG	Steals per game
BPG	Blocks per game	PPG	Points per game

=== Regular season ===
Player	GP	GS	MPG	FG%	3P%	FT%	RPG	APG	SPG	BPG	PPG
Arron Afflalo	53	53	33.0	.428	.337	.841	3.4	1.9	.6	.1	14.5
Darrell Arthur	58	4	17.0	.404	.236	.780	2.9	1.0	.8	.4	6.6
Will Barton^{a}	28	0	24.4	.443	.284	.810	4.6	1.9	1.2	.5	11.0
Ian Clark^{a}	7	0	4.4	.364	.200	1.000	.4	.3	.4	.1	1.9
Wilson Chandler	78	75	31.7	.429	.342	.775	6.1	1.7	.7	.4	13.9
Kenneth Faried	75	71	27.8	.507	.125	.691	8.9	1.2	.8	.8	12.6
Jamaal Franklin	3	0	4.3	.500	.500	.000	.7	1.0	.00	.3	1.0
Randy Foye	50	21	21.7	.368	.357	.818	1.7	2.4	.7	.2	8.7
Danilo Gallinari	59	27	24.2	.401	.355	.895	3.7	1.4	.8	.3	12.4
Alonzo Gee	39	0	13.1	.482	.417	.738	1.8	.5	.7	.2	4.9
Erick Green	43	1	9.5	.377	.298	.833	.7	.9	.3	.00	3.4
Gary Harris	55	6	13.1	.304	.204	.745	1.2	.5	.7	.1	3.4
JJ Hickson	73	8	19.3	.475	.000	.577	6.2	.8	.5	.5	7.6
Joffrey Lauvergne	24	1	11.2	.404	.188	.643	3.2	.5	.3	.4	3.9
Ty Lawson	75	75	35.5	.436	.341	.730	3.1	9.6	1.2	.1	15.2
JaVale McGee	27	17	11.5	.557	.000	.690	2.8	.1	.1	1.1	5.2
Timofey Mozgov	35	35	25.6	.504	.333	.733	7.8	.5	.4	1.2	8.5
Jameer Nelson^{a}	34	5	20.6	.450	.354	.579	1.9	3.7	.7	.1	9.6
Jusuf Nurkic	62	27	17.8	.446	.000	.636	6.2	.8	.8	1.1	6.9
Nate Robinson	33	1	14.1	.348	.261	.650	1.2	2.3	.4	.1	5.8

^{a} Statistics with the Denver Nuggets.

== Injuries ==
Player	Duration		Injury type	Games missed
Player	Start	End	Injury type	Games missed

== Roster ==
2014–15 Denver Nuggets roster
Players

Pos.	No.	Player	Height	Weight	DOB	From
PF	00	Darrell Arthur	6 ft 9 in (2.06 m)	235 lb (107 kg)	1988–03–25	Kansas
SG	5	Will Barton	6 ft 6 in (1.98 m)	175 lb (79 kg)	1991–01–06	Memphis
SF	21	Wilson Chandler	6 ft 8 in (2.03 m)	225 lb (102 kg)	1987–05–10	DePaul
SG	20	Ian Clark	6 ft 3 in (1.91 m)	173 lb (78 kg)	1991–03–07	Belmont
PF	35	Kenneth Faried	6 ft 8 in (2.03 m)	228 lb (103 kg)	1989–11–18	Morehead State
SG	22	Jamaal Franklin	6 ft 5 in (1.96 m)	191 lb (87 kg)	1991–07–21	San Diego State
SG	4	Randy Foye	6 ft 4 in (1.93 m)	213 lb (97 kg)	1983–09–24	Villanova
SF	8	Danilo Gallinari	6 ft 10 in (2.08 m)	225 lb (102 kg)	1988–08–08	Italy
PG	11	Erick Green	6 ft 3 in (1.91 m)	185 lb (84 kg)	1991–05–09	Virginia Tech
SG	14	Gary Harris	6 ft 4 in (1.93 m)	210 lb (95 kg)	1994–09–14	Michigan State
PF	7	JJ Hickson	6 ft 9 in (2.06 m)	242 lb (110 kg)	1988–09–04	NC State
C	77	Joffrey Lauvergne	7 ft 0 in (2.13 m)	240 lb (109 kg)	1991–09–30	France
PG	3	Ty Lawson	5 ft 11 in (1.80 m)	195 lb (88 kg)	1987–11–03	North Carolina
PG	28	Jameer Nelson	6 ft 0 in (1.83 m)	190 lb (86 kg)	1982–02–09	Saint Joseph's
C	23	Jusuf Nurkić	7 ft 0 in (2.13 m)	280 lb (127 kg)	1994–08–23	Bosnia and Herzegovina

Coaches
Head coach
- Melvin Hunt (interim)
Assistant(s)
- Lester Conner
- Noel Gillespie
- Patrick Mutombo

Legend
- (DP) Unsigned draft pick
- (FA) Free agent
- (S) Suspended
- (DL) On assignment to D-League affiliate
- Injured

Roster
Updated: 2015–04–12

== Transactions ==
=== Trades ===
June 26, 2014	To Denver Nuggets (United States) Arron Afflalo	To Orlando Magic (France) Evan Fournier 56th pick in 2014 NBA draft
June 26, 2014	To Denver Nuggets Draft rights to 16th pick Jusuf Nurkić Draft rights to 19th pick Gary Harris 2nd-round pick in 2015 NBA draft	To Chicago Bulls Draft rights to 11th pick Doug McDermott Anthony Randolph
January 7, 2015	To Denver Nuggets MEM's protected 1st-round pick in 2015 NBA draft OKC's protected 1st-round pick in 2015 NBA draft	To Cleveland Cavaliers (Russia) Timofey Mozgov 2nd-round pick in 2015 NBA draft
January 13, 2015	To Denver Nuggets (United States) Jameer Nelson	To Boston Celtics (United States) Nate Robinson
February 19, 2015	To Denver Nuggets (United States) Will Barton (Spain) Víctor Claver (United States) Thomas Robinson Protected 1st-round pick in 2016 NBA draft	To Portland Trail Blazers (United States) Arron Afflalo (United States) Alonzo Gee
February 19, 2015	To Denver Nuggets (Turkey) Cenk Akyol	To Philadelphia 76ers (United States) JaVale McGee (Nigeria) Chukwudiebere Maduabum OKC's protected 1st-round pick in 2015 NBA draft

=== Free agents ===
==== Signings ====
Player	Signed	Contract	Ref.
Darrell Arthur	June 24, 2014	Player option $3.45 million	
Nate Robinson	June 24, 2014	Player option $2 million	
Gary Harris	July 31, 2014	Rookie contract 4 years, $7.3 million Team Option in 2016–17, 2017–18	
Jusuf Nurkic	July 31, 2014	Rookie contract 4 years, $8.5 million Team Option in 2016–17, 2017–18	
Erick Green	August 1, 2014	Rookie contract 3 years, $2.33 million	
Jerrelle Benimon	September 29, 2014	Training camp signing	
Alonzo Gee	September 29, 2014	Training camp signing	
Pops Mensah-Bonsu	September 29, 2014	Training camp signing	
Marcus Williams	September 29, 2014	Training camp signing	
Kenneth Faried	October 6, 2014	4-year extension, $50 million	
Joffrey Lauvergne	February 19, 2015	Rookie contract 4 years, $7.3 million 2016–17 and 2017–18 are not guaranteed	

==== Subtractions ====
Player	Reason left	Date	New team	Ref.
Aaron Brooks	Free Agency	July 22, 2014	Chicago Bulls	
Jan Veselý	Free Agency	August 5, 2014	Fenerbahçe Ülker	
Pops Mensah-Bonsu	Personal Reasons	October 1, 2014	A.E.K. Athens B.C.	
Jerrelle Benimon	Waived	October 22, 2014	Idaho Stampede	
Marcus Williams	Waived	October 22, 2014	Free Agent	
Quincy Miller	Waived	October 27, 2014	Reno Bighorns	
Víctor Claver	Waived	February 22, 2015	BC Khimki	
Thomas Robinson	Waived	February 22, 2015	Philadelphia 76ers	

== Awards ==
Player	Award	Date awarded	Ref.
