= Melvin Hunt =

American basketball coach

Baylor Bears
- Position: Assistant coach
- League: Big 12

Personal information
- Born: December 15, 1969 (age 56) Tallulah, Louisiana, U.S.

Career information
- College: Baylor (1987–1991)

Career history

Coaching
- –: Temple HS (assistant)
- –1999: Incarnate Word (assistant)
- 1999–2001: Houston Rockets (scout)
- 2002–2003: Houston Rockets (assistant)
- 2003–2004: Houston Rockets (scout)
- 2004–2005: Los Angeles Lakers (assistant)
- 2005–2010: Cleveland Cavaliers (assistant)
- 2010–2015: Denver Nuggets (assistant)
- 2015: Denver Nuggets (interim)
- 2015–2018: Dallas Mavericks (assistant)
- 2018–2021: Atlanta Hawks (assistant)
- 2024–present: Baylor (assistant)

Melvin Hunt (born December 15, 1969) is an American college assistant basketball coach of Baylor Bears men's basketball. He was previously an assistant coach of the Atlanta Hawks of the National Basketball Association (NBA).

== Early life ==
A native of Tallulah, Louisiana, Hunt earned his bachelor's degree in business administration and a master's degree in education from Baylor University where he spent four years on the basketball team. He was a four-year letterman and a three-year starter for the Bears from 1987 to 1991 and helped lead his team to both the NCAA and NIT tournaments. Following his graduation, Hunt played professional basketball in the Caribbean and Mexico.

== Coaching career ==
Hunt began his coaching career as an assistant coach at Temple High School (TX) before moving to the college ranks where he was the lead assistant coach at University of the Incarnate Word in San Antonio.

On 1999 he signed with the Houston Rockets, where he spent five years, serving his first two years as a video coordinator/scout and his second two as an assistant coach, before spending his final year as the team's college and international scout. After this, he spent a year as an assistant for the Los Angeles Lakers and then five years as an assistant in the Cleveland Cavaliers; there he helped to lead the Cavaliers to one of the most successful stretches in franchise history. In 2008–09, the Cavs won a franchise and NBA-best 66 games, while Hunt and the coaching staff earned the honor of coaching the Eastern Conference in the 2009 NBA All-Star Game in Phoenix. Cleveland also enjoyed great postseason success during Hunt's tenure with the team, reaching the 2007 NBA Finals, the 2009 Eastern Conference Finals and four consecutive appearances in the Eastern Conference Semifinals from 2007 to 2010. On 2010, after finishing his contract with Cleveland, he signed with the Denver Nuggets, spending the next few years as an assistant coach.

He was appointed the interim head coach of the Nuggets after Brian Shaw was fired on March 3, 2015. On March 3, he made his coaching debut against the Milwaukee Bucks, winning 106–95.

On June 30, 2015, he joined the Dallas Mavericks to become an assistant coach.

On June 8, 2018, Hunt was hired by the Atlanta Hawks as an assistant coach.

== Head coaching record ==
Legend
Regular season	G	Games coached	W	Games won	L	Games lost	W–L %	Win–loss %
Playoffs	PG	Playoff games	PW	Playoff wins	PL	Playoff losses	PW–L %	Playoff win–loss %

Team	Year	G	W	L	W–L%	Finish	PG	PW	PL	PW–L%	Result
Denver	2014–15	23	10	13	.435	4th in Northwest	—	—	—	—	Missed playoffs
Career		23	10	13	.435		—	—	—	—	

== Personal life ==
Hunt and his wife have two children.
