= 2014–15 Toronto Raptors season =

NBA professional basketball team season

- Division champions
- Head coach: Dwane Casey
- Owners: Maple Leaf Sports & Entertainment
- Arena: Air Canada Centre

Results
- Record: 49–33 (.598)
- Place: Division: 1st (Atlantic); Conference: 4th (Eastern)
- Playoff finish: First Round (lost to Wizards 0–4)
- Stats at Basketball Reference

The 2014–15 Toronto Raptors season was the 20th season of the franchise in the National Basketball Association (NBA). In honor of the Raptors 20th season, they revealed the throwback purple "dino" jerseys to wear on several nights. The Raptors repeated as Atlantic Division champions for the first time in franchise history, and finished in fourth place in Eastern conference, winning 49 games during the regular season, breaking their franchise record of 48 wins in the previous season. Despite this achievement, the fourth-seeded Raptors were unexpectedly swept in the opening round of the playoffs by the fifth-seeded Washington Wizards as they extended their post-season series victory drought. Their all-time playoff series record dipped to one and seven, now having lost their last six consecutive series, and their lone series win coming in 2001 against the Knicks. This year's defeat was primarily blamed on the team's poor defense which was notably exploited by the Wizards.

== Draft picks ==
Round	Pick	Player	Position	Nationality	College/Club Team
1	20	Bruno Caboclo	SF	Brazil	E.C. Pinheiros (Brazil)
2	37	DeAndre Daniels	SF	United States	Connecticut
2	59	Xavier Thames	SG	United States	San Diego State

== Regular season ==
The Raptors took advantage of a favourable early schedule to reach the top spot in the Eastern Conference for the first time in franchise history as well as having the best start in franchise history with a 9–2 record. They briefly fell back to second after a loss to the Chicago Bulls, but regained the number one position one game later, which was followed by six-game winning streak. The Raptors remained as Eastern Conference leaders, but on November 28, 2014, the Raptors not only lost their position as NBA-leaders in a 106–102 loss to the Dallas Mavericks that dropped them to a 13–3 record but also faced a major setback when All-Star DeMar DeRozan tore his left adductor longus tendon in the third quarter of the game. This was followed by another loss to the Los Angeles Lakers in overtime two nights later when Kobe Bryant recorded his first triple double of the season defeating the Raptors 129–122. The Raptors also fell to the Cleveland Cavaliers in back-to-back games before entering a six-game winning streak without DeRozan. However, things began to fall apart after a six-game road trip during the winter holidays where they lost 4 of those 6 games as poor defense led to a 2–8 record in their first ten games in January. The downfall dropped the team from first place to the Atlanta Hawks and found themselves battling for second with the Washington Wizards as DeRozan returned to the lineup on January 14. On January 22, Kyle Lowry was named as a starter for the 2015 NBA All-Star Game after a last-minute voting rally by fans with help by Canadian Prime Minister Stephen Harper and celebrity Justin Bieber (who tweeted his support on Twitter but failed to include '#NBAballot' in his tweet) helped Lowry overtake Dwyane Wade who was second in the backcourt votes. This makes him the third Raptor to start in the all-star game after Chris Bosh and Vince Carter. The Raptors ended the month of January on a positive note with a six-game winning streak which included back-to-back overtime victories to the Brooklyn Nets and Washington Wizards however, struggled in February as the Raptors went 4–7. The rest of the season represented a decline for the Raptors as they won just 13 of 29 games after the all-star break and all-star point guard Lowry averaged 15.3 PPG while struggling with back spasms in the latter part of the season. Despite the lows, the Raptors finished once again as Atlantic Division Champions finishing with a franchise-high 49 wins while clinching the fourth seed.

== Standings ==
The Raptors faced off against the Wizards in the opening round of the playoffs where they once again faced Paul Pierce who faced the Raptors in the previous year with the Brooklyn Nets where he blocked a potential game-winning shot by Lowry. Much of the anticipation for the playoffs were created by Pierce who stated that the Raptors 'did not have it' which disgruntled many Raptor fans.

=== Standings ===
Atlantic Division	W	L	PCT	GB	Home	Road	Div	GP
y-Toronto Raptors	49	33	.598	–	27‍–‍14	22‍–‍19	11–5	82
x-Boston Celtics	40	42	.488	9.0	21‍–‍20	19‍–‍22	12–4	82
x-Brooklyn Nets	38	44	.463	11.0	19‍–‍22	19‍–‍22	10–6	82
Philadelphia 76ers	18	64	.220	31.0	12‍–‍29	6‍–‍35	2–14	82
New York Knicks	17	65	.207	32.0	10‍–‍31	7‍–‍34	5–11	82

Eastern Conference
#	Team	W	L	PCT	GB	GP
1	c-Atlanta Hawks *	60	22	.732	–	82
2	y-Cleveland Cavaliers *	53	29	.646	7.0	82
3	x-Chicago Bulls	50	32	.610	10.0	82
4	y-Toronto Raptors *	49	33	.598	11.0	82
5	x-Washington Wizards	46	36	.561	14.0	82
6	x-Milwaukee Bucks	41	41	.500	19.0	82
7	x-Boston Celtics	40	42	.488	20.0	82
8	x-Brooklyn Nets	38	44	.463	22.0	82
9	Indiana Pacers	38	44	.463	22.0	82
10	Miami Heat	37	45	.451	23.0	82
11	Charlotte Hornets	33	49	.402	27.0	82
12	Detroit Pistons	32	50	.390	28.0	82
13	Orlando Magic	25	57	.305	35.0	82
14	Philadelphia 76ers	18	64	.220	42.0	82
15	New York Knicks	17	65	.207	43.0	82

== Game log ==
=== Preseason ===
2014 pre-season game log
Total: 6–1 (home: 4–0; road: 2–1)
Pre-season: 6–1 (home: 4–0; road: 2–1)

Game	Date	Team	Score	High points	High rebounds	High assists	Location Attendance	Record
1	October 5	Sacramento	W 99–94	DeMar DeRozan (21)	Amir Johnson (8)	Greivis Vásquez (5)	Rogers Arena 19,908	1–0
2	October 7	@ Sacramento	L 106–113	Kyle Lowry (25)	Hansbrough, Johnson & Valančiūnas (5)	Kyle Lowry (6)	Sleep Train Arena 12,546	1–1
3	October 10	Boston	W 116–109	DeRozan & Lowry (18)	Jonas Valančiūnas (9)	Kyle Lowry (6)	Air Canada Centre 18,201	2–1
4	October 13	@ New York	W 81–76	Louis Williams (21)	Tyler Hansbrough (6)	Louis Williams (3)	Madison Square Garden 19,867	3–1
5	October 15	@ Boston	W 92–89	Jordan Hamilton (16)	Johnson, Ross & Vásquez (5)	Vásquez, Fields & Hamilton (3)	TD Garden 14,309	4–1
6	October 17	Oklahoma City	W 109–90	Terrence Ross (22)	7 Players Tied (4)	DeRozan & Lowry (4)	Intrust Bank Arena 9,534	5–1
7	October 24	New York	W 83–80	DeMar DeRozan (15)	Kyle Lowry & Patrick Patterson (7)	Kyle Lowry (8)	Bell Centre 20,738	6–1

2014–15 season schedule

=== Regular season ===
2014–15 game log
Total: 49–33 (home: 27–14; road: 22–19)
October: 1–0 (home: 1–0; road: 0–0)

Game	Date	Team	Score	High points	High rebounds	High assists	Location Attendance	Record
1	October 29	Atlanta	W 109–102	Jonas Valančiūnas (17)	DeMar DeRozan (11)	Kyle Lowry (10)	Air Canada Centre; 19,800	1–0

November : 12–4 (home: 8–2; road: 4–2)

Game	Date	Team	Score	High points	High rebounds	High assists	Location Attendance	Record
2	November 1	@ Orlando	W 108–95	DeMar DeRozan (26)	Jonas Valančiūnas (11)	Kyle Lowry (5)	Amway Center; 16,141	2–0
3	November 2	@ Miami	L 102–107	DeMar DeRozan (30)	Jonas Valančiūnas (8)	Kyle Lowry (3)	American Airlines Arena; 19,666	2–1
4	November 4	Oklahoma City	W 100–88	DeMar DeRozan (16)	Patrick Patterson (8)	Kyle Lowry & James Johnson (5)	Air Canada Centre; 18,877	3–1
5	November 5	@ Boston	W 110–107	Kyle Lowry (35)	Tyler Hansbrough (5)	DeMar DeRozan (6)	TD Garden; 16,249	4–1
6	November 7	Washington	W 103–84	DeMar DeRozan (25)	Kyle Lowry (11)	Kyle Lowry (10)	Air Canada Centre; 19,800	5–1
7	November 9	Philadelphia	W 120–88	DeMar DeRozan (24)	Tyler Hansbrough (6)	Greivis Vásquez (6)	Air Canada Centre; 18,470	6–1
8	November 11	Orlando	W 104–100	Kyle Lowry (19)	James Johnson (10)	Kyle Lowry (7)	Air Canada Centre; 19,800	7–1
9	November 13	Chicago	L 93–100	Kyle Lowry (20)	Lowry & Jonas Valančiūnas (8)	Kyle Lowry (8)	Air Canada Centre; 19,800	7–2
10	November 15	Utah	W 111–93	DeMar DeRozan (27)	Jonas Valančiūnas (14)	Kyle Lowry (4)	Air Canada Centre; 19,800	8–2
11	November 19	Memphis	W 96–92	DeMar DeRozan (21)	Amir Johnson (9)	Kyle Lowry (7)	Air Canada Centre; 19,800	9–2
12	November 21	Milwaukee	W 124–82	Louis Williams (22)	Jonas Valančiūnas (12)	Greivis Vásquez (6)	Air Canada Centre; 19,800	10–2
13	November 22	@ Cleveland	W 110–93	Louis Williams (36)	Patrick Patterson (6)	Kyle Lowry (8)	Quicken Loans Arena; 20,562	11–2
14	November 24	Phoenix	W 104–100	Jonas Valančiūnas (27)	Jonas Valančiūnas (11)	Kyle Lowry (8)	Air Canada Centre; 19,800	12–2
15	November 26	@ Atlanta	W 126–115	DeMar DeRozan (27)	Valančiūnas & Patterson (7)	Kyle Lowry (13)	Philips Arena; 16,253	13–2
16	November 28	Dallas	L 102–106	Kyle Lowry (25)	Jonas Valančiūnas (13)	Greivis Vásquez (6)	Air Canada Centre; 19,800	13–3
17	November 30	@ LA Lakers	L 122–129 (OT)	Kyle Lowry (29)	Valančiūnas & Patterson (13)	Kyle Lowry (9)	Staples Center; 18,997	13–4

December : 11–4 (home: 5–1; road: 6–3)

Game	Date	Team	Score	High points	High rebounds	High assists	Location Attendance	Record
18	December 2	@ Sacramento	W 117–109	Kyle Lowry (27)	Jonas Valančiūnas (8)	Kyle Lowry (13)	Sleep Train Arena; 15,552	14–4
19	December 3	@ Utah	W 123–104	Kyle Lowry (39)	Jonas Valančiūnas (6)	Greivis Vásquez (5)	EnergySolutions Arena; 16,667	15–4
20	December 5	Cleveland	L 91–105	Amir Johnson (27)	Patrick Patterson (8)	Kyle Lowry (9)	Air Canada Centre; 20,077	15–5
21	December 8	Denver	W 112–107 (OT)	Louis Williams (26)	Jonas Valančiūnas (12)	Kyle Lowry (13)	Air Canada Centre; 19,800	16–5
22	December 9	@ Cleveland	L 101–105	Terrence Ross (18)	Jonas Valančiūnas (15)	Kyle Lowry (14)	Quicken Loans Arena; 20,562	16–6
23	December 12	Indiana	W 106–94	Louis Williams (26)	Jonas Valančiūnas (14)	Kyle Lowry (7)	Air Canada Centre; 19,800	17–6
24	December 14	@ New York	W 95–90 (OT)	Terrence Ross (22)	Jonas Valančiūnas (13)	Kyle Lowry (11)	Madison Square Garden; 19,812	18–6
25	December 15	Orlando	W 95–82	Louis Williams (18)	Jonas Valančiūnas (8)	Kyle Lowry (8)	Air Canada Centre; 19,800	19–6
26	December 17	Brooklyn	W 105–89	Kyle Lowry (20)	Jonas Valančiūnas (10)	Kyle Lowry (12)	Air Canada Centre; 19,800	20–6
27	December 19	@ Detroit	W 110–100	Jonas Valančiūnas (17)	A. Johnson & J. Johnson (8)	Kyle Lowry (7)	The Palace of Auburn Hills; 16,274	21–6
28	December 21	New York	W 118–108	Lowry & Williams (22)	Amir Johnson (9)	Kyle Lowry (9)	Air Canada Centre; 19,800	22–6
29	December 22	@ Chicago	L 120–129	Kyle Lowry (34)	Valančiūnas & Patterson (9)	Vásquez & Williams (4)	United Center; 21,846	22–7
30	December 27	@ LA Clippers	W 110–98	Kyle Lowry (25)	Amir Johnson (12)	Kyle Lowry (7)	Staples Center; 19,335	23–7
31	December 28	@ Denver	W 116–102	Louis Williams (31)	Terrence Ross (8)	Kyle Lowry (11)	Pepsi Center; 14,216	24–7
32	December 30	@ Portland	L 97–102 (OT)	Kyle Lowry (25)	James Johnson (11)	Kyle Lowry (5)	Moda Center; 20,053	24–8

January : 9–7 (home: 4–4; road: 5–3)

Game	Date	Team	Score	High points	High rebounds	High assists	Location Attendance	Record
33	January 2	@ Golden State	L 105–126	Greivis Vásquez (25)	James Johnson (10)	Kyle Lowry (8)	Oracle Arena; 19,596	24–9
34	January 4	@ Phoenix	L 109–125	Jonas Valančiūnas (21)	Jonas Valančiūnas (10)	Kyle Lowry (7)	US Airways Center; 17,166	24–10
35	January 8	Charlotte	L 95–103	Kyle Lowry (24)	Kyle Lowry (7)	Kyle Lowry (7)	Air Canada Centre; 19,800	24–11
36	January 10	Boston	W 109–96	Lowry, Williams (19)	James Johnson (10)	Kyle Lowry (7)	Air Canada Centre; 19,800	25–11
37	January 12	Detroit	L 111–114	Jonas Valančiūnas (31)	Jonas Valančiūnas (12)	Kyle Lowry (12)	Air Canada Centre; 19,800	25–12
38	January 14	Philadelphia	W 100–84	DeMar DeRozan (20)	Amir Johnson (16)	Kyle Lowry (12)	Air Canada Centre; 19,800	26–12
39	January 16	Atlanta	L 89–110	DeMar DeRozan (20)	Valančiūnas, Johnson (6)	Greivis Vásquez (6)	Air Canada Centre; 19,800	26–13
40	January 18	New Orleans	L 93–95	DeMar DeRozan (22)	James Johnson (10)	Greivis Vásquez (10)	Air Canada Centre; 19,800	26–14
41	January 19	@ Milwaukee	W 92–89	Kyle Lowry (18)	Valančiūnas & Patterson (13)	DeMar DeRozan (4)	BMO Harris Bradley Center; 12,707	27–14
42	January 21	@ Memphis	L 86–92	Louis Williams (21)	Jonas Valančiūnas (10)	Lowry, Vásquez, Johnson (19)	FedExForum; 15,112	27–15
43	January 23	@ Philadelphia	W 91–86	Kyle Lowry (21)	Patrick Patterson (13)	Kyle Lowry (5)	Wells Fargo Center; 13,640	28–15
44	January 25	Detroit	W 114–110	DeMar DeRozan (25)	Jonas Valančiūnas (11)	Kyle Lowry (8)	Air Canada Centre; 19,800	29–15
45	January 27	@ Indiana	W 104–91	DeMar DeRozan (24)	Jonas Valančiūnas (8)	Kyle Lowry (8)	Bankers Life Fieldhouse; 16,204	30–15
46	January 28	Sacramento	W 119–102	Louis Williams (27)	Jonas Valančiūnas (9)	Kyle Lowry (7)	Air Canada Centre; 19,800	31–15
47	January 30	@ Brooklyn	W 127–122 (OT)	DeMar DeRozan (26)	Jonas Valančiūnas (11)	DeMar DeRozan (9)	Barclays Center; 17,062	32–15
48	January 31	@ Washington	W 120–116 (OT)	Kyle Lowry (23)	DeMar DeRozan (8)	DeMar DeRozan (10)	Verizon Center; 20,356	33–15

February : 4–7 (home: 3–3; road: 1–4)

Game	Date	Team	Score	High points	High rebounds	High assists	Location Attendance	Record
49	February 2	Milwaukee	L 75–82	DeMar DeRozan (16)	Jonas Valančiūnas (13)	Kyle Lowry (5)	Air Canada Centre; 19,800	33–16
50	February 4	Brooklyn	L 93–109	Terrence Ross (23)	Jonas Valančiūnas (10)	Kyle Lowry (10)	Air Canada Centre; 19,800	33–17
51	February 6	LA Clippers	W 123–107	DeMar DeRozan (24)	DeMar DeRozan (9)	DeMar DeRozan (8)	Air Canada Centre; 19,800	34–17
52	February 8	San Antonio	W 87–82	James Johnson (20)	Jonas Valančiūnas (16)	Kyle Lowry (7)	Air Canada Centre; 19,800	35–17
53	February 11	Washington	W 95–93	Louis Williams (27)	Patrick Patterson (8)	Kyle Lowry (6)	Air Canada Centre; 19,800	36–17
All-Star Break
54	February 20	@ Atlanta	W 105–80	Louis Williams (26)	Jonas Valančiūnas (13)	Kyle Lowry (9)	Philips Arena; 18,968	37–17
55	February 21	@ Houston	L 76–98	James Johnson (27)	Valančiūnas, Johnson (7)	Kyle Lowry (6)	Toyota Center; 18,329	37–18
56	February 23	@ New Orleans	L 97–100	Kyle Lowry (22)	Jonas Valančiūnas (14)	Kyle Lowry (5)	Smoothie King Center; 16,514	37–19
57	February 24	@ Dallas	L 92–99	DeMar DeRozan (18)	Jonas Valančiūnas (9)	Kyle Lowry (6)	American Airlines Center; 20,151	37–20
58	February 27	Golden State	L 89–113	Terrence Ross (18)	Jonas Valančiūnas (12)	Greivis Vásquez (4)	Air Canada Centre; 19,800	37–21
59	February 28	@ New York	L 98–103	Louis Williams (22)	Jonas Valančiūnas (8)	Greivis Vásquez (6)	Madison Square Garden; 19,812	37–22

March : 7–8 (home: 5–3; road: 2–5)

Game	Date	Team	Score	High points	High rebounds	High assists	Location Attendance	Record
60	March 2	@ Philadelphia	W 114–103	DeMar DeRozan (35)	DeMar DeRozan (9)	Vásquez, DeRozan, Williams (5)	Wells Fargo Center; 10,742	38–22
61	March 4	Cleveland	L 112–120	Williams, Valančiūnas (26)	Jonas Valančiūnas (11)	Greivis Vásquez (13)	Air Canada Centre; 19,800	38–23
62	March 6	@ Charlotte	L 94–103	DeMar DeRozan (30)	Jonas Valančiūnas (6)	Terrence Ross (7)	Time Warner Cable Arena; 19,080	38–24
63	March 8	@ Oklahoma City	L 104–108	DeMar DeRozan (24)	Patrick Patterson (8)	DeMar DeRozan (9)	Chesapeake Energy Arena; 18,203	38–25
64	March 10	@ San Antonio	L 107–117	Kyle Lowry (32)	Amir Johnson (14)	Kyle Lowry (5)	AT&T Center; 18,581	38–26
65	March 13	Miami	W 102–92	Kyle Lowry (19)	Kyle Lowry (8)	Kyle Lowry (8)	Air Canada Centre; 19,800	39–26
66	March 15	Portland	L 97–113	DeMar DeRozan (22)	Jonas Valančiūnas (9)	Kyle Lowry (6)	Air Canada Centre; 19,800	39–27
67	March 16	@ Indiana	W 117–98	Louis Williams (24)	Jonas Valančiūnas (12)	Kyle Lowry (10)	Bankers Life Fieldhouse; 17,060	40–27
68	March 18	Minnesota	W 105–100	DeMar DeRozan (21)	Jonas Valančiūnas (15)	Kyle Lowry (6)	Air Canada Centre; 19,800	41–27
69	March 20	@ Chicago	L 92–108	DeMar DeRozan (27)	DeMar DeRozan (6)	Greivis Vásquez (6)	United Center; 21,998	41–28
70	March 22	New York	W 106–89	DeMar DeRozan (23)	Jonas Valančiūnas (10)	DeMar DeRozan (5)	Air Canada Centre; 19,800	42–28
71	March 24	@ Detroit	L 104–108	DeMar DeRozan (22)	DeMar DeRozan (10)	DeRozan, Patterson (4)	The Palace of Auburn Hills; 14,420	42–29
72	March 25	Chicago	L 103–116	Greivis Vásquez (22)	Jonas Valančiūnas (12)	DeMar DeRozan (5)	Air Canada Centre; 19,800	42–30
73	March 27	LA Lakers	W 94–83	Jonas Valančiūnas (19)	DeMar DeRozan (10)	DeMar DeRozan (9)	Air Canada Centre; 19,800	43–30
74	March 30	Houston	W 99–96	DeMar DeRozan (42)	Amir Johnson (16)	Greivis Vásquez (7)	Air Canada Centre; 19,800	44–30

April : 5–3 (home: 1–1; road: 4–2)

Game	Date	Team	Score	High points	High rebounds	High assists	Location Attendance	Record
75	April 1	@ Minnesota	W 113–99	Louis Williams (18)	Tyler Hansbrough (11)	Patterson, Johnson (6)	Target Center; 12,699	45–30
76	April 3	@ Brooklyn	L 109–114	Louis Williams (23)	Patterson, Valančiūnas (9)	DeMar DeRozan (8)	Barclays Center; 17,732	45–31
77	April 4	Boston	L 116–117 (OT)	Louis Williams (27)	Jonas Valančiūnas (14)	Louis Williams (4)	Air Canada Centre; 19,800	45–32
78	April 8	@ Charlotte	W 92–74	DeMar DeRozan (18)	Tyler Hansbrough (12)	DeMar DeRozan (7)	Time Warner Cable Arena; 15,593	46–32
79	April 10	@ Orlando	W 101–99	DeMar DeRozan (29)	Jonas Valančiūnas (13)	Kyle Lowry (7)	Amway Center; 16,227	47–32
80	April 11	@ Miami	W 107–104	DeMar DeRozan (24)	Tyler Hansbrough (10)	Patrick Patterson (3)	American Airlines Arena; 19,689	48–32
81	April 14	@ Boston	L 93–95	Lowry, Williams (14)	Valančiūnas, Johnson (8)	Greivis Vásquez (7)	TD Garden; 18,624	48–33
82	April 15	Charlotte	W 92–87	Kyle Lowry (26)	Amir Johnson (6)	Kyle Lowry (7)	Air Canada Centre; 19,800	49–33

2014–15 season schedule

== Playoffs ==
=== Game log ===
2015 playoff game log
Total: 0–4 (home: 0–2; road: 0–2)
First Round: 0–4 (home: 0–2; road: 0–2)

Game	Date	Team	Score	High points	High rebounds	High assists	Location Attendance	Series
1	April 18	Washington	L 86–93 (OT)	Amir Johnson (18)	DeMar DeRozan (11)	DeMar DeRozan (6)	Air Canada Centre; 19,800	0–1
2	April 21	Washington	L 106–117	DeRozan, Williams (20)	Jonas Valančiūnas (10)	DeMar DeRozan (7)	Air Canada Centre; 19,800	0–2
3	April 24	@ Washington	L 99–106	DeMar DeRozan (32)	Amir Johnson (12)	Kyle Lowry (7)	Verizon Center; 20,356	0–3
4	April 26	@ Washington	L 94–125	Kyle Lowry (21)	Jonas Valančiūnas (9)	DeRozan, Lowry, Vásquez (4)	Verizon Center; 20,356	0–4

2015 playoff schedule

== Player statistics ==
=== Regular season ===
Player	POS	GP	GS	MP	REB	AST	STL	BLK	PTS	MPG	RPG	APG	SPG	BPG	PPG
Terrence Ross	SF	82	61	2,092	226	86	53	25	807	25.5	2.8	1.0	.6	.3	9.8
Greivis Vásquez	PG	82	29	1,991	216	302	46	10	775	24.3	2.6	3.7	.6	.1	9.5
Patrick Patterson	PF	81	4	2,156	433	155	60	44	648	26.6	5.3	1.9	.7	.5	8.0
Jonas Valančiūnas	C	80	80	2,096	693	39	33	95	963	26.2	8.7	.5	.4	1.2	12.0
Lou Williams	SG	80	0	2,016	151	164	88	10	1,242	25.2	1.9	2.1	1.1	.1	15.5
Amir Johnson	PF	75	72	1,979	456	117	44	59	694	26.4	6.1	1.6	.6	.8	9.3
Tyler Hansbrough	PF	74	8	1,058	265	21	30	15	270	14.3	3.6	.3	.4	.2	3.6
Kyle Lowry	PG	70	70	2,414	328	473	109	13	1,244	34.5	4.7	6.8	1.6	.2	17.8
James Johnson	PF	70	17	1,370	257	95	54	70	554	19.6	3.7	1.4	.8	1.0	7.9
DeMar DeRozan	SG	60	60	2,100	277	210	73	11	1,204	35.0	4.6	3.5	1.2	.2	20.1
Chuck Hayes	C	29	0	255	51	20	10	4	50	8.8	1.8	.7	.3	.1	1.7
Landry Fields	SF	26	9	216	26	15	11	0	46	8.3	1.0	.6	.4	.0	1.8
Greg Stiemsma	C	17	0	66	15	3	2	0	14	3.9	.9	.2	.1	.0	.8
Bruno Caboclo	SF	8	0	23	2	0	0	1	10	2.9	.3	.0	.0	.1	1.3
Lucas Nogueira	C	6	0	23	11	1	2	0	6	3.8	1.8	.2	.3	.0	1.0

=== Playoffs ===
Player	POS	GP	GS	MP	REB	AST	STL	BLK	PTS	MPG	RPG	APG	SPG	BPG	PPG
DeMar DeRozan	SG	4	4	159	25	23	6	0	81	39.8	6.3	5.8	1.5	.0	20.3
Kyle Lowry	PG	4	4	131	22	19	5	0	49	32.8	5.5	4.8	1.3	.0	12.3
Terrence Ross	SF	4	4	107	6	4	3	4	28	26.8	1.5	1.0	.8	1.0	7.0
Jonas Valančiūnas	C	4	4	106	37	2	2	1	45	26.5	9.3	.5	.5	.3	11.3
Amir Johnson	PF	4	2	112	28	4	1	3	46	28.0	7.0	1.0	.3	.8	11.5
Tyler Hansbrough	PF	4	2	48	6	3	2	1	5	12.0	1.5	.8	.5	.3	1.3
Patrick Patterson	PF	4	0	106	14	5	3	0	41	26.5	3.5	1.3	.8	.0	10.3
Lou Williams	SG	4	0	102	7	5	6	0	51	25.5	1.8	1.3	1.5	.0	12.8
Greivis Vásquez	PG	4	0	101	7	12	2	0	30	25.3	1.8	3.0	.5	.0	7.5
James Johnson	PF	2	0	12	2	1	0	0	4	6.0	1.0	.5	.0	.0	2.0
Greg Stiemsma	C	1	0	2	0	0	0	0	5	2.0	.0	.0	.0	.0	5.0

- ^{†} Denotes player spent time with another team in the season. Stats reflect time with the Raptors only.

== Injuries ==
Player	Duration		Injury type	Games missed
Start	End		Injury type	Games missed
DeMar DeRozan	November 28, 2014	January 14, 2015	Torn left adductor longus tendon	21 games

== Roster ==
2014–15 Toronto Raptors roster
Players

Pos.	No.	Player	Height	Weight	DOB	From
SF	5	Bruno Caboclo	6 ft 9 in (2.06 m)	200 lb (91 kg)	1995–09–21	Brazil
SG	10	DeMar DeRozan	6 ft 7 in (2.01 m)	220 lb (100 kg)	1989–08–07	USC
SF	2	Landry Fields	6 ft 7 in (2.01 m)	215 lb (98 kg)	1988–06–27	Stanford
PF	50	Tyler Hansbrough	6 ft 9 in (2.06 m)	250 lb (113 kg)	1985–11–03	North Carolina
C	44	Chuck Hayes	6 ft 6 in (1.98 m)	250 lb (113 kg)	1983–06–11	Kentucky
PF	15	Amir Johnson	6 ft 9 in (2.06 m)	210 lb (95 kg)	1987–05–01	Westchester HS (CA)
SF	3	James Johnson	6 ft 9 in (2.06 m)	248 lb (112 kg)	1987–02–20	Wake Forest
PG	7	Kyle Lowry	6 ft 0 in (1.83 m)	205 lb (93 kg)	1986–03–25	Villanova
C	92	Lucas Nogueira	7 ft 0 in (2.13 m)	220 lb (100 kg)	1992–07–26	Brazil
PF	54	Patrick Patterson	6 ft 9 in (2.06 m)	235 lb (107 kg)	1989–03–14	Kentucky
SF	31	Terrence Ross	6 ft 6 in (1.98 m)	195 lb (88 kg)	1991–02–05	Washington
C	34	Greg Stiemsma	6 ft 11 in (2.11 m)	260 lb (118 kg)	1985–09–26	Wisconsin
C	17	Jonas Valančiūnas	7 ft 0 in (2.13 m)	255 lb (116 kg)	1992–05–06	Lithuania
PG	21	Greivis Vásquez	6 ft 6 in (1.98 m)	211 lb (96 kg)	1987–01–16	Maryland
SG	23	Louis Williams	6 ft 2 in (1.88 m)	175 lb (79 kg)	1986–10–27	South Gwinnett HS (GA)

Coaches
Head coach
- Dwane Casey
Assistant(s)
- Bill Bayno
- Jamaal Magloire
- Jama Mahlalela
- Jesse Mermuys
- Nick Nurse
- Tom Sterner

Legend
- (DP) Unsigned draft pick
- (FA) Free agent
- (S) Suspended
- (DL) On assignment to
  D-League affiliate
- Injured

Roster
Updated: 2015–03–26

== Transactions ==
=== Free agents ===
==== Re-signed ====
Player	Signed	Contract	Ref.

==== Additions ====
Player	Signed	Former team	Ref.

==== Subtractions ====
Player	Reason left	Date	New team	Ref.

== Awards ==
Player	Award	Date awarded	Ref.
