= 2014–15 Atlanta Hawks season =

NBA professional basketball team season

- Division champions
- Head coach: Mike Budenholzer
- Owners: Atlanta Hawks, LLC
- Arena: Philips Arena

Results
- Record: 60–22 (.732)
- Place: Division: 1st (Southeast); Conference: 1st (Eastern)
- Playoff finish: Eastern Conference Finals (lost to Cavaliers 0–4)
- Stats at Basketball Reference

Local media
- Television: Fox Sports South
- Radio: 92.9 FM "The Game"

The 2014–15 Atlanta Hawks season was the 66th season of the franchise in the National Basketball Association (NBA) and the 47th in Atlanta. Their Southeast Division championship was the first for the Hawks since winning the Central Division in 1994. It was the best finish by the team since finishing first in the Eastern Conference during the 1993–94 season. This was the first time since the Southeast Division was created for the 2004–05 season that the division title was not won by a team from the state of Florida.

The Hawks finished the season with a 60–22 record for a franchise high in wins, earning them the first seed in the Eastern Conference and home court advantage for the Conference. The Hawks would reach their first-ever Conference finals since the NBA was split into two conferences, but their season ended with a four-game sweep against the Cleveland Cavaliers, the team that swept them in the 2009 Conference Semi-finals. The Cavaliers would go on to lose to the Golden State Warriors in the Finals in six games. The Hawks became the first #1 seed to get swept in a playoff series since the Detroit Pistons in 2003 as well as the first #1 seed since the 2011–12 San Antonio Spurs to lose in the conference finals. Their 22 wins improvement was the second largest by a team that made playoffs in consecutive non-lockout seasons behind 25 wins by the 1995–96 Chicago Bulls.

The Hawks would not return to the conference finals until 2021 where they were defeated by the eventual champion Milwaukee Bucks, led by former Hawks coach Mike Budenholzer, in six games.

== Preseason ==
=== Draft picks ===
Round	Pick	Player	Position	Nationality	School/Club team
1	15	Adreian Payne	PF	United States	Michigan State
2	43	Walter Tavares	C	Cape Verde	Gran Canaria (Spain)

== Roster ==
2014–15 Atlanta Hawks roster
Players

Pos.	No.	Player	Height	Weight	DOB	From
C	6	Pero Antić	6 ft 11 in (2.11 m)	260 lb (118 kg)	1982–07–29	Macedonia
G	24	Kent Bazemore	6 ft 5 in (1.96 m)	201 lb (91 kg)	1989–07–01	Old Dominion
F	7	Elton Brand	6 ft 9 in (2.06 m)	254 lb (115 kg)	1979–03–11	Duke
F	5	DeMarre Carroll	6 ft 8 in (2.03 m)	212 lb (96 kg)	1986–07–27	Missouri
F	3	Austin Daye	6 ft 11 in (2.11 m)	220 lb (100 kg)	1988–06–05	Gonzaga
C	15	Al Horford	6 ft 10 in (2.08 m)	250 lb (113 kg)	1986–06–03	Florida
G	12	John Jenkins	6 ft 4 in (1.93 m)	215 lb (98 kg)	1991–03–06	Vanderbilt
G	26	Kyle Korver	6 ft 7 in (2.01 m)	212 lb (96 kg)	1981–03–17	Creighton
G	8	Shelvin Mack	6 ft 3 in (1.91 m)	207 lb (94 kg)	1990–04–22	Butler
F	4	Paul Millsap	6 ft 8 in (2.03 m)	263 lb (119 kg)	1985–02–10	Louisiana Tech
C	31	Mike Muscala	6 ft 11 in (2.11 m)	239 lb (108 kg)	1991–07–01	Bucknell
G	17	Dennis Schröder	6 ft 1 in (1.85 m)	168 lb (76 kg)	1993–09–15	Germany
F	32	Mike Scott	6 ft 8 in (2.03 m)	237 lb (108 kg)	1988–07–16	Virginia
F	25	Thabo Sefolosha	6 ft 7 in (2.01 m)	222 lb (101 kg)	1984–05–02	Switzerland
G	0	Jeff Teague	6 ft 2 in (1.88 m)	181 lb (82 kg)	1988–06–10	Wake Forest

Coaches
Head coach
- Mike Budenholzer
Assistant(s)
- Kenny Atkinson
- Darvin Ham
- Taylor Jenkins
- Charles Lee
- Neven Spahija
- Ben Sullivan
- Pete Radulovic (player development)

Legend
- (DP) Unsigned draft pick
- (FA) Free agent
- (S) Suspended
- (DL) On assignment to D-League affiliate
- Injured

Roster
Updated: 2015–04–04

== Regular season ==
=== Standings ===
Southeast Division	W	L	PCT	GB	Home	Road	Div	GP
c-Atlanta Hawks	60	22	.732	–	35‍–‍6	25‍–‍16	12–4	82
x-Washington Wizards	46	36	.561	14.0	29‍–‍12	17‍–‍24	10–6	82
Miami Heat	37	45	.451	23.0	20‍–‍21	17‍–‍24	6–10	82
Charlotte Hornets	33	49	.402	27.0	19‍–‍22	14‍–‍27	8–8	82
Orlando Magic	25	57	.305	35.0	13‍–‍28	12‍–‍29	4–12	82

Eastern Conference
#	Team	W	L	PCT	GB	GP
1	c-Atlanta Hawks *	60	22	.732	–	82
2	y-Cleveland Cavaliers *	53	29	.646	7.0	82
3	x-Chicago Bulls	50	32	.610	10.0	82
4	y-Toronto Raptors *	49	33	.598	11.0	82
5	x-Washington Wizards	46	36	.561	14.0	82
6	x-Milwaukee Bucks	41	41	.500	19.0	82
7	x-Boston Celtics	40	42	.488	20.0	82
8	x-Brooklyn Nets	38	44	.463	22.0	82
9	Indiana Pacers	38	44	.463	22.0	82
10	Miami Heat	37	45	.451	23.0	82
11	Charlotte Hornets	33	49	.402	27.0	82
12	Detroit Pistons	32	50	.390	28.0	82
13	Orlando Magic	25	57	.305	35.0	82
14	Philadelphia 76ers	18	64	.220	42.0	82
15	New York Knicks	17	65	.207	43.0	82

== Game log ==
=== Pre-season ===
2014 pre-season game log
Total: 4–3 (home: 2–1; road: 4–2)
Pre-season: 4–3 (home: 2–1; road: 2–2)

Game	Date	Team	Score	High points	High rebounds	High assists	Location Attendance	Record
1	October 6	New Orleans	W 93–87	John Jenkins (13)	Mike Muscala (10)	Schröder, Millsap (4)	Philips Arena; 10,146	1–0
2	October 11	@ Memphis	L 88–93	John Jenkins (15)	Adreian Payne (8)	Shelvin Mack (8)	FedExForum; 11,867	1–1
3	October 14	@ Miami	W 109–103	Paul Millsap (23)	DeMarre Carroll (6)	Jeff Teague (5)	American Airlines Arena; 19,600	2–1
4	October 16	@ Chicago	L 84–85	Mike Scott (15)	Horford & Brand (6)	Dennis Schröder (6)	United Center; 21,405	2–2
5	October 18	Detroit	L 100–104	Jeff Teague (16)	Millsap, Korver (7)	Jeff Teague (10)	Philips Arena; 10,560	2–3
6	October 20	Charlotte	W 117–114 (OT)	Paul Millsap (21)	Thabo Sefolosha (8)	Sefolosha & Schröder (5)	Philips Arena; 8,148	3–3
7	October 22	@ San Antonio	W 117–107	Jeff Teague (21)	Paul Millsap (8)	Paul Millsap (5)	AT&T Center; 16,711	4–3

2014–15 season schedule

=== Regular season ===
2014–15 game log
Total: 60–22 (home: 35–6; road: 25–16)
October: 0–1 (home: 0–0; road: 0–1)

Game	Date	Team	Score	High points	High rebounds	High assists	Location Attendance	Record
1	October 29	@ Toronto	L 102–109	Korver, Scott, & Teague (20)	Al Horford (13)	Jeff Teague (8)	Air Canada Centre; 19,800	0–1

November: 9–5 (home: 7–2; road: 2–3)

Game	Date	Team	Score	High points	High rebounds	High assists	Location Attendance	Record
2	November 1	Indiana	W 102–92	Jeff Teague (25)	DeMarre Carroll (9)	Jeff Teague (6)	Philips Arena; 19,118	1–1
3	November 5	@ San Antonio	L 92–94	Millsap & Carroll (17)	Millsap & Horford (7)	Jeff Teague (7)	AT&T Center; 18,581	1–2
4	November 7	@ Charlotte	L 119–122 (2OT)	Al Horford (24)	Al Horford (10)	Jeff Teague (15)	Time Warner Cable Arena; 15,891	1–3
5	November 8	New York	W 103–96	Kyle Korver (27)	Paul Millsap (13)	Jeff Teague (5)	Philips Arena; 17,521	2–3
6	November 10	@ New York	W 91–85	Paul Millsap (19)	DeMarre Carroll (10)	Jeff Teague (6)	Madison Square Garden; 19,812	3–3
7	November 12	Utah	W 100–97	Paul Millsap (30)	Paul Millsap (17)	Jeff Teague (8)	Philips Arena; 12,595	4–3
8	November 14	Miami	W 114–103	Millsap & Horford (19)	Paul Millsap (9)	Jeff Teague (9)	Philips Arena; 17,090	5–3
9	November 15	@ Cleveland	L 94–127	Paul Millsap (16)	Paul Millsap (7)	Shelvin Mack (6)	Quicken Loans Arena; 20,562	5–4
10	November 18	LA Lakers	L 109–114	Paul Millsap (29)	Thabo Sefolosha (9)	Shelvin Mack (5)	Philips Arena; 17,848	5–5
11	November 21	Detroit	W 99–89	Jeff Teague (28)	Paul Millsap (12)	Jeff Teague (6)	Philips Arena; 16,517	6–5
12	November 25	@ Washington	W 107–102	Jeff Teague (28)	Paul Millsap (11)	Shelvin Mack (5)	Verizon Center; 15,440	7–5
13	November 26	Toronto	L 115–126	Jeff Teague (24)	Al Horford (9)	Jeff Teague (12)	Philips Arena; 16,253	7–6
14	November 28	New Orleans	W 100–91	Jeff Teague (26)	Al Horford (10)	Jeff Teague (7)	Philips Arena; 17,079	8–6
15	November 29	Charlotte	W 105–75	Paul Millsap (18)	Elton Brand (9)	Jeff Teague (10)	Philips Arena; 14,185	9–6

December: 14–2 (home: 7–1; road: 7–1)

Game	Date	Team	Score	High points	High rebounds	High assists	Location Attendance	Record
16	December 2	Boston	W 109–105	Kyle Korver (24)	Millsap, Horford, Korver (6)	Jeff Teague (9)	Philips Arena; 12,705	10–6
17	December 3	@ Miami	W 112–102	Jeff Teague (27)	Millsap, Korver (6)	Jeff Teague (6)	American Airlines Arena; 19,600	11–6
18	December 5	@ Brooklyn	W 98–75	DeMarre Carroll (18)	Paul Millsap (9)	Teague, Schroder (5)	Barclays Center; 16,146	12–6
19	December 7	Denver	W 96–84	Paul Millsap (23)	DeMarre Carroll (9)	Jeff Teague (7)	Philips Arena; 12,143	13–6
20	December 8	@ Indiana	W 108–92	Al Horford (25)	Horford, Millsap (8)	Jeff Teague (7)	Bankers Life Fieldhouse; 14,519	14–6
21	December 10	Philadelphia	W 95–79	Korver, Millsap (17)	DeMarre Carroll (11)	Jeff Teague (6)	Philips Arena; 11,733	15–6
22	December 12	Orlando	W 87–81	Paul Millsap (23)	Paul Millsap (8)	Teague, Schroder (5)	Philips Arena; 13,247	16–6
23	December 13	@ Orlando	L 99–100	Jeff Teague (24)	Paul Millsap (10)	Jeff Teague (8)	Amway Center; 15,939	16–7
24	December 15	Chicago	W 93–86	Al Horford (21)	Al Horford (10)	Jeff Teague (7)	Philips Arena; 16,805	17–7
25	December 17	@ Cleveland	W 127–98	Shelvin Mack (24)	Paul Millsap (8)	Dennis Schroder (10)	Quicken Loans Arena; 20,562	18–7
26	December 20	@ Houston	W 104–97	Kyle Korver (22)	Al Horford (8)	Dennis Schroder (6)	Toyota Center; 16,998	19–7
27	December 22	@ Dallas	W 105–102	Dennis Schroder (22)	Paul Millsap (12)	Paul Millsap (7)	American Airlines Center; 20,339	20–7
28	December 23	LA Clippers	W 107–104	DeMarre Carroll (25)	DeMarre Carroll (10)	Paul Millsap (7)	Philips Arena; 19,191	21–7
29	December 26	Milwaukee	L 77–107	Paul Millsap (22)	Paul Millsap (11)	Teague, Korver, Mack (4)	Philips Arena; 19,016	21–8
30	December 27	@ Milwaukee	W 90–85	Jeff Teague (25)	Al Horford (9)	Jeff Teague (7)	BMO Harris Bradley Center; 16,788	22–8
31	December 30	Cleveland	W 109–101	Paul Millsap (26)	Millsap, Carroll (9)	Jeff Teague (11)	Philips Arena; 19,215	23–8

January: 17–0 (home: 9–0; road: 8–0)

Game	Date	Team	Score	High points	High rebounds	High assists	Location Attendance	Record
32	January 2	@ Utah	W 98–92	Jeff Teague (26)	Paul Millsap (11)	Jeff Teague (8)	EnergySolutions Arena; 19,029	24–8
33	January 3	@ Portland	W 115–107	Paul Millsap (27)	Thabo Sefolosha (12)	Jeff Teague (6)	Moda Center; 19,829	25–8
34	January 5	@ LA Clippers	W 107–98	Paul Millsap (23)	Millsap, Carroll (8)	Jeff Teague (9)	Staples Center; 19,060	26–8
35	January 7	Memphis	W 96–86	Jeff Teague (25)	Paul Millsap (9)	Jeff Teague (6)	Philips Arena; 17,126	27–8
36	January 9	@ Detroit	W 106–103	Al Horford (19)	Al Horford (16)	Jeff Teague (11)	The Palace of Auburn Hills; 18,859	28–8
37	January 11	Washington	W 120–89	Kyle Korver (19)	Thabo Sefolosha (8)	Jeff Teague (10)	Philips Arena; 18,057	29–8
38	January 13	@ Philadelphia	W 105–87	Al Horford (21)	Al Horford (10)	Horford, Mack (10)	Wells Fargo Center; 10,466	30–8
39	January 14	@ Boston	W 105–91	Teague, Carroll (22)	Paul Millsap (10)	Jeff Teague (6)	TD Garden; 16,067	31–8
40	January 16	@ Toronto	W 110–89	Al Horford (22)	Paul Millsap (8)	Jeff Teague (9)	Air Canada Centre; 19,800	32–8
41	January 17	@ Chicago	W 107–99	Kyle Korver (24)	Al Horford (9)	Jeff Teague (11)	United Center; 22,024	33–8
42	January 19	Detroit	W 93–82	Millsap, Scott (20)	Paul Millsap (7)	Teague, Horford (7)	Philips Arena; 19,108	34–8
43	January 21	Indiana	W 110–91	Carroll, Teague (17)	Paul Millsap (9)	Jeff Teague (11)	Philips Arena; 15,045	35–8
44	January 23	Oklahoma City	W 103–93	Paul Millsap (22)	Al Horford (12)	Jeff Teague (9)	Philips Arena; 19,203	36–8
45	January 25	Minnesota	W 112–100	Paul Millsap (20)	Horford, Carroll (6)	Jeff Teague (7)	Philips Arena; 18,049	37–8
46	January 28	Brooklyn	W 113–102	Paul Millsap (28)	Paul Millsap (15)	Jeff Teague (11)	Philips Arena; 18,047	38–8
47	January 30	Portland	W 105–99	Paul Millsap (21)	Millsap, Horford (8)	Jeff Teague (8)	Philips Arena; 19,018	39–8
48	January 31	Philadelphia	W 91–85	Al Horford (23)	Al Horford (11)	Jeff Teague (7)	Philips Arena; 19,006	40–8

February: 7–4 (home: 4–1; road: 3–3)

Game	Date	Team	Score	High points	High rebounds	High assists	Location Attendance	Record
49	February 2	@ New Orleans	L 100–115	Jeff Teague (21)	Al Horford (9)	Jeff Teague (7)	Smoothie King Center; 15,487	40–9
50	February 4	Washington	W 105–96	Jeff Teague (26)	Al Horford (13)	Jeff Teague (8)	Philips Arena; 18,047	41–9
51	February 6	Golden State	W 124–116	Jeff Teague (23)	Al Horford (14)	Teague, Schroder (7)	Philips Arena; 19,225	42–9
52	February 8	@ Memphis	L 88–94	Jeff Teague (22)	Al Horford (12)	Jeff Teague (6)	FedExForum; 18,119	42–10
53	February 9	@ Minnesota	W 117–105	Al Horford (28)	Paul Millsap (9)	Teague, Millsap (7)	Target Center; 10,987	43–10
54	February 11	@ Boston	L 88–89	Al Horford (22)	Al Horford (12)	Jeff Teague (8)	TD Garden; 16,083	43–11
All-Star Break
55	February 20	Toronto	L 80–105	Millsap, Teague, Korver (11)	Al Horford (12)	Jeff Teague (5)	Philips Arena; 18,968	43–12
56	February 22	@ Milwaukee	W 97–86	Paul Millsap (23)	Paul Millsap (16)	Dennis Schröder (9)	BMO Harris Bradley Center; 14,787	44–12
57	February 25	Dallas	W 104–87	Dennis Schröder (17)	Millsap & Horford (8)	Al Horford (6)	Philips Arena; 16,126	45–12
58	February 27	Orlando	W 95–88	Paul Millsap (20)	Al Horford (13)	Jeff Teague (7)	Philips Arena; 18,968	46–12
59	February 28	@ Miami	W 93–91	Paul Millsap (22)	Elton Brand (8)	Dennis Schröder (10)	American Airlines Arena; 19,733	47–12

March : 9–7 (home: 5–1; road: 4–6)

Game	Date	Team	Score	High points	High rebounds	High assists	Location Attendance	Record
60	March 3	Houston	W 104–96	Jeff Teague (25)	Paul Millsap (14)	Dennis Schröder (8)	Philips Arena; 18,968	48–12
61	March 6	Cleveland	W 106–97	Al Horford (19)	Al Horford (9)	Dennis Schröder (8)	Philips Arena; 19,244	49–12
62	March 7	@ Philadelphia	L 84–92	Jeff Teague (17)	Kent Bazemore (9)	Dennis Schröder (6)	Wells Fargo Center; 17,624	49–13
63	March 9	Sacramento	W 130–105	Korver & Carroll (20)	Carroll & Teague (5)	Jeff Teague (13)	Philips Arena; 18,047	50–13
64	March 11	@ Denver	L 102–115	Kyle Korver (18)	Paul Millsap (5)	Shelvin Mack (5)	Pepsi Center; 13,217	50–14
65	March 13	@ Phoenix	W 96–87	Paul Millsap (23)	Paul Millsap (9)	Jeff Teague (9)	US Airways Center; 17,136	51–14
66	March 15	@ LA Lakers	W 91–86	Dennis Schroder (24)	Kent Bazemore (9)	Dennis Schroder (10)	Staples Center; 17,422	52–14
67	March 16	@ Sacramento	W 110–103	Jeff Teague (23)	Paul Millsap (10)	Teague & Schröder (6)	Sleep Train Arena; 16,835	53–14
68	March 18	@ Golden State	L 95–114	Carroll & Millsap (16)	DeMarre Carroll (12)	Shelvin Mack (5)	Oracle Arena; 19,596	53–15
69	March 20	@ Oklahoma City	L 115–123	Pero Antic (22)	Al Horford (11)	Horford & Mack & Schröder (4)	Chesapeake Energy Arena; 18,203	53–16
70	March 22	San Antonio	L 95–114	Paul Millsap (22)	Paul Millsap (7)	Jeff Teague (6)	Philips Arena; 19,193	53–17
71	March 25	@ Orlando	W 95–83	Paul Millsap (25)	Paul Millsap (11)	Jeff Teague (9)	Amway Center; 17,224	54–17
72	March 27	Miami	W 99–86	DeMarre Carroll (24)	Paul Millsap (9)	Dennis Schröder (11)	Philips Arena; 19,233	55–17
73	March 28	@ Charlotte	L 100–115	Kent Bazemore (20)	Mike Muscala (10)	Dennis Schroder (11)	Time Warner Cable Arena; 19,122	55–18
74	March 30	Milwaukee	W 101–88	DeMarre Carroll (23)	Paul Millsap (9)	Jeff Teague (9)	Philips Arena; 18,453	56–18
75	March 31	@ Detroit	L 95–105	Thabo Sefolosha (19)	Mike Muscala (13)	Shelvin Mack (5)	The Palace of Auburn Hills; 14,242	56–19

April : 4–3 (home: 3–1; road: 1–2)

Game	Date	Team	Score	High points	High rebounds	High assists	Location Attendance	Record
76	April 4	Brooklyn	W 131–99	Carroll & Horford (20)	DeMarre Carroll (8)	Jeff Teague (8)	Philips Arena; 18,769	57–19
77	April 7	Phoenix	W 96–69	Carroll & Muscala & Teague (16)	Kent Bazemore (9)	Mack & Schroder (4)	Philips Arena; 18,650	58–19
78	April 8	@ Brooklyn	W 114–111	Al Horford (24)	DeMarre Carroll (9)	Jeff Teague (12)	Barclays Center; 17,732	59–19
79	April 10	Charlotte	W 104–80	Mike Muscala (17)	Al Horford (8)	Jeff Teague (8)	Philips Arena; 18,452	60–19
80	April 12	@ Washington	L 99–108	Mike Scott (19)	Pero Antic (7)	Shelvin Mack (6)	Verizon Center; 19,041	60–20
81	April 13	New York	L 108–112	Korver & Teague (19)	Bazemore & Horford & Scott (6)	Jeff Teague (9)	Philips Arena; 18,265	60–21
82	April 15	@ Chicago	L 85–91	Dennis Schroder (21)	Al Horford (7)	Horford & Millsap & Teaguet (4)	United Center; 22,172	60–22

2014–15 season schedule

== Playoffs ==
2015 playoff game log
Total: 8–8 (home: 5–3; road: 3–5)
First Round: 4–2 (home: 3–0; road: 1–2)

Game	Date	Team	Score	High points	High rebounds	High assists	Location Attendance	Series
1	April 19	Brooklyn	W 99–92	Kyle Korver (21)	Al Horford (10)	Carroll, Korver, Teague (3)	Philips Arena; 18,440	1–0
2	April 22	Brooklyn	W 96–91	Paul Millsap (19)	Al Horford (13)	Al Horford (7)	Philips Arena; 18,207	2–0
3	April 25	@ Brooklyn	L 83–91	DeMarre Carroll (22)	Paul Millsap (17)	Jeff Teague (6)	Barclays Center; 17,732	2–1
4	April 27	@ Brooklyn	L 115–120 (OT)	Carroll, Teague (20)	Paul Millsap (12)	Jeff Teague (11)	Barclays Center; 17,732	2–2
5	April 29	Brooklyn	W 107–97	DeMarre Carroll (24)	Al Horford (15)	Jeff Teague (8)	Philips Arena; 18,105	3–2
6	May 1	@ Brooklyn	W 111–87	Paul Millsap (25)	Paul Millsap (9)	Jeff Teague (13)	Barclays Center; 17,732	4–2

Conference Semifinals: 4–2 (home: 2–1; road: 2–1)

Game	Date	Team	Score	High points	High rebounds	High assists	Location Attendance	Series
1	May 3	Washington	L 98–104	DeMarre Carroll (24)	Al Horford (17)	Paul Millsap (8)	Philips Arena; 18,148	0–1
2	May 5	Washington	W 106–90	DeMarre Carroll (22)	Paul Millsap (11)	Jeff Teague (8)	Philips Arena; 18,131	1–1
3	May 9	@ Washington	L 101–103	Teague, Schroder (18)	Al Horford (10)	Jeff Teague (7)	Verizon Center; 20,356	1–2
4	May 11	@ Washington	W 106–101	Jeff Teague (26)	Al Horford (10)	Teague, Schroder (8)	Verizon Center; 20,356	2–2
5	May 13	Washington	W 82–81	Al Horford (23)	Al Horford (11)	Dennis Schroder (7)	Philips Arena; 18,854	3–2
6	May 15	@ Washington	W 94–91	DeMarre Carroll (25)	Paul Millsap (13)	Jeff Teague (7)	Verizon Center; 20,356	4–2

Conference Finals: 0–4 (home: 0–2; road: 0–2)

Game	Date	Team	Score	High points	High rebounds	High assists	Location Attendance	Record
1	May 20	Cleveland	L 89–97	Jeff Teague (27)	Millsap, Horford, Korver (7)	Teague, Schroder (4)	Philips Arena; 18,489	0–1
2	May 22	Cleveland	L 82–94	Dennis Schröder (13)	Mike Scott (7)	Jeff Teague (6)	Philips Arena; 18,670	0–2
3	May 24	@ Cleveland	L 111–114 (OT)	Jeff Teague (30)	Millsap, Scott (9)	Jeff Teague (7)	Quicken Loans Arena; 20,562	0–3
4	May 26	@ Cleveland	L 88–118	Jeff Teague (17)	Paul Millsap (10)	Millsap, Horford (5)	Quicken Loans Arena; 20,562	0–4

2015 playoff schedule

== Player statistics ==
Legend
GP	Games played	GS	Games started	MPG	Minutes per game
FG%	Field-goal percentage	3P%	3-point field-goal percentage	FT%	Free-throw percentage
RPG	Rebounds per game	APG	Assists per game	SPG	Steals per game
BPG	Blocks per game	PPG	Points per game

=== Regular season ===
Player	GP	GS	MPG	FG%	3P%	FT%	RPG	APG	SPG	BPG	PPG
Pero Antić	63	3	16.5	.365	.301	.720	3.0	0.8	0.3	0.2	5.7
Kent Bazemore	75	10	17.7	.426	.364	.600	3.0	1.0	0.7	0.4	5.2
Elton Brand	36	4	13.5	.442	.000	.520	2.8	0.6	0.5	0.7	2.7
DeMarre Carroll	70	69	31.3	.487	.395	.700	5.3	1.7	1.3	0.2	12.6
Austin Daye	8	0	9.5	.385	.387	.500	1.8	1.0	0.5	0.8	3.3
Jarell Eddie*	0	0	0	.000	.000	.000	0	0	0	0	0
Al Horford	76	76	30.5	.538	.306	.760	7.2	3.2	0.9	1.3	15.2
John Jenkins	24	3	12.4	.495	.404	.840	1.6	0.5	0.4	0.0	5.6
Kyle Korver	75	75	32.2	.487	.492	.900	4.1	2.6	0.7	0.6	12.1
Shelvin Mack	55	0	15.1	.401	.315	.810	1.4	2.8	0.6	0.0	5.4
Paul Millsap	73	73	32.7	.476	.356	.760	7.8	3.1	1.8	1.0	16.7
Mike Muscala	40	8	12.6	.550	.409	.880	3.0	0.6	0.4	0.5	4.9
Adreian Payne*	3	0	6.3	.286	.000	.500	1.3	0.0	0.3	0.0	1.7
Dennis Schröder	77	10	19.7	.427	.351	.830	2.1	4.1	0.6	0.1	10.0
Mike Scott	68	0	16.5	.444	.344	.790	2.9	1.1	0.4	0.0	7.8
Thabo Sefolosha	52	7	18.8	.418	.321	.780	4.3	1.4	1.0	0.4	5.3
Jeff Teague	73	72	30.5	.460	.343	.860	2.5	7.0	1.7	0.4	15.9

=== Playoffs ===
Player	GP	GS	MPG	FG%	3P%	FT%	RPG	APG	SPG	BPG	PPG
DeMarre Carroll	16	16	34.9	.486	.403	.780	6.1	2.0	1.1	.3	14.6
Jeff Teague	16	16	33.1	.410	.323	.867	3.2	6.7	1.5	.4	16.8
Al Horford	16	16	32.6	.507	.222	.750	8.6	3.7	.8	1.4	14.4
Paul Millsap	16	15	35.4	.407	.306	.744	8.7	3.4	1.6	.9	15.2
Kent Bazemore	16	2	18.9	.423	.214	.677	3.3	.8	.7	.6	5.4
Dennis Schröder	16	0	18.1	.386	.235	.857	1.8	3.9	.6	.0	9.0
Pero Antić	15	1	13.3	.320	.344	.800	2.9	.3	.1	.2	4.2
Kyle Korver	14	14	37.6	.391	.355	.813	5.0	2.4	1.4	1.1	11.1
Mike Scott	11	0	15.6	.382	.154	1.000	4.2	.5	.5	.0	4.5
Mike Muscala	10	0	10.2	.606	.250		1.8	.1	.1	.3	4.2
Shelvin Mack	10	0	9.9	.385	.286	.500	1.1	1.0	.8	.0	3.9
John Jenkins	4	0	5.3	.667	.500		.8	.0	.0	.0	2.5
Elton Brand	3	0	1.3	.000		.500	.3	.0	.0	.0	.3

== Injuries ==
Player	Duration		Injury type	Games missed
Player	Start	End	Injury type	Games missed
Adreian Payne	November 1, 2014	November 23, 2014	Plantar fasciitis	10
DeMarre Carroll	November 12, 2014	November 18, 2014	Strained groin	4
Mike Scott	November 12, 2014	November 13, 2014	Bruised lower back	1
Thabo Sefolosha	November 26, 2014	November 29, 2014	Illness	2
Mike Scott	December 10, 2014	December 12, 2014	Flu-like symptoms	1
Pero Antić	December 12, 2014	December 16, 2014	Flu-like symptoms	3
Jeff Teague	December 17, 2014	December 22, 2014	Hamstring	3
Pero Antić	December 23, 2014	December 24, 2014	Sprained right ankle	1
Shelvin Mack	January 17, 2015	February 5, 2015	Strained left calf	9
DeMarre Carroll	January 30, 2015	February 2, 2015	Strained left Achilles	3
Thabo Sefolosha	January 30, 2015	March 24, 2015	Strained right calf	23
Mike Scott	March 12, 2015	April 4, 2015	Left big toe strain	12
Kyle Korver	March 15, 2015	March 21, 2015	Broken nose	3
Jeff Teague	March 27, 2015	March 29, 2015	Ankle soreness	2
Dennis Schröder	March 31, 2015	April 6, 2015	Sprained left toe	2
Paul Millsap	April 6, 2015	TBD	Shoulder sprain	TBD
Thabo Sefolosha	April 8, 2015	TBD	Broken Ankle	Season

== Transactions ==
=== Trades ===
June 26, 2014	To Atlanta Hawks Draft rights to 48th pick Lamar Patterson	To Milwaukee Bucks 2015 second-round pick
June 30, 2014	To Atlanta Hawks John Salmons; 2015 second-round pick	To Toronto Raptors Louis Williams; Rights to Lucas Nogueira
July 15, 2014	To Atlanta Hawks Thabo Sefolosha (sign and trade); Rights to Georgios Printezis; Cash considerations	To Oklahoma City Thunder Rights to Sofoklis Schortsanitis; Trade exception
February 10, 2015	To Atlanta Hawks 2017 first-round pick	To Minnesota Timberwolves Adreian Payne

=== Free agents ===
==== Re-signed ====
Player	Signed	Contract	Ref.
Shelvin Mack	August 22, 2014	3 Year, $7.3 Million	
Mike Scott	August 26, 2014	3 Year, $10 Million	
Elton Brand	September 10, 2014	1 Year, $2 Million	
Austin Daye	March 25, 2015	10 Day, $30 Thousand	
Austin Daye	April 3, 2015	1 Year, $125 Thousand	

==== Additions ====
Player	Signed	Former team	Contract	Ref.
Adreian Payne	July 25, 2014	Michigan State Spartans (DP)	2 Year, $1.5 Million	
Kent Bazemore	September 10, 2014	Los Angeles Lakers	2 Year, $4 Million	
Jarell Eddie *	September 29, 2014	Virginia Tech Hokies	Training Camp	
Dexter Pittman *	September 29, 2014	(Puerto Rico) Caciques Humacao	Training Camp	
Jarell Eddie	March 5, 2015	Austin Spurs (D-League)	10 Day, $30 Thousand	
Austin Daye	March 15, 2015	Erie BayHawks (D-League)	10 Day, $30 Thousand	

* = Cut before regular season

==== Subtractions ====
Player	Reason left	Date	New team	Ref.
Gustavo Ayón	Free Agent	July 1, 2014	(Spain) Real Madrid	
Cartier Martin	Free Agent	July 1, 2014	Detroit Pistons	
John Salmons	Waived	July 10, 2014	New Orleans Pelicans	
Jarell Eddie	Free Agent	March 14, 2015	Austin Spurs (D-League)	
