= 2014–15 Miami Heat season =

NBA professional basketball team season

- Head coach: Erik Spoelstra
- President: Pat Riley
- General manager: Andy Elisburg
- Owner: Micky Arison
- Arena: American Airlines Arena

Results
- Record: 37–45 (.451)
- Place: Division: 3rd (Southeast); Conference: 10th (Eastern)
- Playoff finish: Did not qualify
- Stats at Basketball Reference

The 2014–15 Miami Heat season was the 27th season of the franchise in the National Basketball Association (NBA). For the first time since 2010, LeBron James was not on the roster as he returned to the Cleveland Cavaliers. The Heat entered the 2014–15 season as the four-time defending Eastern Conference champions without LeBron, and were coming off of an NBA Finals loss in five games to the San Antonio Spurs. Although they remained in playoff contention until early April, the Heat were eliminated from playoff contention after their game 80 loss to the Toronto Raptors. The Heat failed to make the playoffs for the first time since 2008 after a four-year trip to the Finals, winning two in 2012 and 2013, and the first team since the 2004–05 Los Angeles Lakers and last until the 2018–19 Cleveland Cavaliers to fail to make the playoffs after making it to the NBA Finals from the previous season as well as the first since the 2004–05 Lakers and last until the 2018–19 Cavaliers to miss the playoffs after losing the previous year's Finals.

For the first time since 1995–96, Ray Allen was not in the NBA as he sat out this season as a free agent and retired in 2016. Allen played with the Heat for 2 seasons where he helped them win a championship in 2013, his second ring after winning one in 2008 with the Boston Celtics.

== Preseason ==
=== Draft picks ===
Round	Pick	Player	Position	Nationality	College/Team
1	26	P. J. Hairston	SG	United States	Texas Legends (D-League)
2	55	Semaj Christon	PG	United States	Xavier

== Regular season ==
=== Standings ===
Eastern Conference
#	Team	W	L	PCT	GB	GP
1	c-Atlanta Hawks *	60	22	.732	–	82
2	y-Cleveland Cavaliers *	53	29	.646	7.0	82
3	x-Chicago Bulls	50	32	.610	10.0	82
4	y-Toronto Raptors *	49	33	.598	11.0	82
5	x-Washington Wizards	46	36	.561	14.0	82
6	x-Milwaukee Bucks	41	41	.500	19.0	82
7	x-Boston Celtics	40	42	.488	20.0	82
8	x-Brooklyn Nets	38	44	.463	22.0	82
9	Indiana Pacers	38	44	.463	22.0	82
10	Miami Heat	37	45	.451	23.0	82
11	Charlotte Hornets	33	49	.402	27.0	82
12	Detroit Pistons	32	50	.390	28.0	82
13	Orlando Magic	25	57	.305	35.0	82
14	Philadelphia 76ers	18	64	.220	42.0	82
15	New York Knicks	17	65	.207	43.0	82

== Game log ==
=== Preseason ===
2014 pre-season game log
Total: 4–4 (Home: 2–4; Road: 2–0)
Pre-season: 4–4 (home: 2–4; road: 2–0)

Game	Date	Team	Score	High points	High rebounds	High assists	Location Attendance	Record
1	October 4	New Orleans	L 86–98	James Ennis (17)	Bosh, Jones, Ennis (6)	Danny Granger (4)	KFC Yum! Center; 20,074	0–1
2	October 7	Orlando	L 101–108 (OT)	Bosh, Deng (18)	James Ennis (10)	Norris Cole (6)	American Airlines Arena; 19,600	0–2
3	October 11	Cleveland	L 119–122 (OT)	Chris Bosh (19)	Chris Bosh (8)	Wade, Napier (7)	HSBC Arena; 15,411	0–3
4	October 14	Atlanta	L 103–109	Chris Bosh (22)	Chris Bosh (9)	Dwyane Wade (5)	American Airlines Arena; 19,600	0–4
5	October 17	Golden State	W 115–108	Chris Bosh (21)	Bosh, Williams (7)	Wade, Deng (3)	Sprint Center; 12,783	1–4
6	October 18	@ San Antonio	W 111–108 (OT)	Shabazz Napier (25)	Khem Birch (13)	Shabazz Napier (4)	AT&T Center; 18,581	2–4
7	October 21	Houston	W 90–85	Dwyane Wade (26)	Chris Andersen (7)	Dwyane Wade (6)	American Airlines Arena; 19,600	3–4
8	October 24	@ Memphis	W 104–98	Chris Bosh (21)	Bosh, Birch (6)	Norris Cole (7)	FedEx Forum; 10,843	4-4

2014–15 pre-season schedule

=== Regular season ===
2014–15 game log
Total: 37–45 (Home: 20–21; Road: 17–24)
October: 1–0 (home: 1–0; road: 0–0)

Game	Date	Team	Score	High points	High rebounds	High assists	Location Attendance	Record
1	October 29	Washington	W 107–95	Chris Bosh (26)	Chris Bosh (15)	Bosh & Chalmers (4)	American Airlines Arena; 19,744	1–0

November : 8–7 (home: 3–5; road: 5–2)

Game	Date	Team	Score	High points	High rebounds	High assists	Location Attendance	Record
2	November 1	@ Philadelphia	W 114–96	Chris Bosh (30)	Chris Bosh (8)	Dwyane Wade (10)	Wells Fargo Center; 19,753	2–0
3	November 2	Toronto	W 107–102	Chris Bosh (21)	Bosh & Wade (11)	Dwyane Wade (7)	American Airlines Arena; 19,666	3–0
4	November 4	Houston	L 91–108	Chris Bosh (21)	Chris Bosh (8)	Shabazz Napier (4)	American Airlines Arena; 19,666	3–1
5	November 5	@ Charlotte	L 89–96	Dwyane Wade (25)	Chris Bosh (13)	Dwyane Wade (7)	Time Warner Cable Arena; 15,874	3–2
6	November 8	Minnesota	W 102–92	Dwyane Wade (25)	Bosh & Williams (7)	Dwyane Wade (8)	American Airlines Arena; 19,735	4–2
7	November 9	@ Dallas	W 105–96	Luol Deng (30)	Chris Bosh (10)	Dwyane Wade (10)	American Airlines Center; 20,195	5–2
8	November 12	Indiana	L 75–81	Dwyane Wade (20)	Luol Deng (7)	Norris Cole (7)	American Airlines Arena; 19,658	5–3
9	November 14	@ Atlanta	L 103–114	Mario Chalmers (23)	Chris Bosh (8)	Mario Chalmers (11)	Philips Arena; 17,090	5–4
10	November 16	Milwaukee	L 84–91	Mario Chalmers (18)	Shawne Williams (11)	Bosh & Chalmers (5)	American Airlines Arena; 19,680	5–5
11	November 17	@ Brooklyn	W 95–83	Mario Chalmers (22)	Chris Bosh (9)	Mario Chalmers (5)	Barclays Center; 17,732	6–5
12	November 20	L.A. Clippers	L 93–110	Chris Bosh (28)	Chris Bosh (7)	Chalmers & Napier (3)	American Airlines Arena; 19,685	6–6
13	November 22	@ Orlando	W 99–92	Chris Bosh (32)	Chris Bosh (10)	Mario Chalmers (8)	Amway Center; 18,846	7–6
14	November 23	Charlotte	W 94–93	Luol Deng (26)	Chris Bosh (10)	Mario Chalmers (10)	American Airlines Arena; 19,639	8–6
15	November 25	Golden State	L 97–114	Chris Bosh (26)	Chris Bosh (9)	Chalmers & Ennis (4)	American Airlines Arena; 19,647	8–7
16	November 30	@ New York	W 86–79	Dwyane Wade (27)	Luol Deng (10)	Dwyane Wade (5)	Madison Square Garden; 19,812	9–7

December : 5–12 (home: 2–7; road: 3–5)

Game	Date	Team	Score	High points	High rebounds	High assists	Location Attendance	Record
17	December 1	@ Washington	L 86–107	Chris Bosh (21)	Chris Bosh (8)	Josh McRoberts (4)	Verizon Center; 15,150	9–8
18	December 3	Atlanta	L 102–112	Dwyane Wade (28)	Chris Bosh (11)	Mario Chalmers (11)	American Airlines Arena; 19,600	9–9
19	December 5	@ Milwaukee	L 85–109	Dwyane Wade (28)	Chris Bosh (6)	Dwyane Wade (8)	BMO Harris Bradley Center; 16,325	9–10
20	December 7	@ Memphis	L 87–103	Dwyane Wade (25)	Udonis Haslem (8)	Dwyane Wade (6)	FedExForum; 16,572	9–11
21	December 9	@ Phoenix	W 103–97	Chris Bosh (34)	Chris Bosh (9)	Josh McRoberts (7)	US Airways Center; 14,963	10–11
22	December 10	@ Denver	L 82–102	Chris Bosh (14)	Norris Cole (8)	Norris Cole (8)	Pepsi Center; 13,433	10–12
23	December 12	@ Utah	W 100–95	Dwyane Wade (29)	Chris Bosh (9)	Dwyane Wade (7)	EnergySolutions Arena; 19,911	11–12
24	December 14	Chicago	L 75–93	Deng & Wade (17)	Luol Deng (10)	Norris Cole (6)	American Airlines Arena; 19,600	11–13
25	December 16	@ Brooklyn	W 95–91	Dwyane Wade (28)	Chris Andersen (9)	Mario Chalmers (5)	Barclays Center; 16,827	12–13
26	December 17	Utah	L 87–105	Dwyane Wade (42)	Chris Andersen (9)	Dwyane Wade (3)	American Airlines Arena; 19,633	12–14
27	December 19	Washington	L 103–105	Dwyane Wade (28)	Hassan Whiteside (7)	Dwyane Wade (8)	American Airlines Arena; 19,600	12–15
28	December 21	Boston	W 100–84	Luol Deng (23)	James Ennis (8)	Mario Chalmers (10)	American Airlines Arena; 19,720	13–15
29	December 23	Philadelphia	L 87–91	Dwyane Wade (23)	Udonis Haslem (8)	Dwyane Wade (6)	American Airlines Arena; 19,600	13–16
30	December 25	Cleveland	W 101–91	Dwyane Wade (31)	Deng & Andersen (8)	Luol Deng (8)	American Airlines Arena; 19,817	14–16
31	December 27	Memphis	L 95–103	Dwyane Wade (25)	Hassan Whiteside (7)	Dwyane Wade (7)	American Airlines Arena; 19,744	14–17
32	December 29	Orlando	L 101–102	Dwyane Wade (25)	Chris Bosh (8)	Dwyane Wade (6)	American Airlines Arena; 19,887	14–18
33	December 31	@ Indiana	L 95–106	Dwyane Wade (20)	Chris Bosh (8)	Dwyane Wade (7)	Bankers Life Fieldhouse; 18,165	14–19

January : 6–7 (home: 2–3; road: 4–4)

Game	Date	Team	Score	High points	High rebounds	High assists	Location Attendance	Record
34	January 3	@ Houston	L 79–115	Bosh & Wade (15)	Deng & Whiteside (6)	Mario Chalmers (5)	Toyota Center; 18,338	14–20
35	January 4	Brooklyn	W 88–84	Chris Bosh (26)	Hassan Whiteside (10)	Dwyane Wade (7)	American Airlines Arena; 20,181	15–20
36	January 8	@ Portland	L 83–99	Dwyane Wade (23)	Hassan Whiteside (8)	Chris Bosh (5)	Moda Center; 19,441	15–21
37	January 11	@ L.A. Clippers	W 104–90	Chris Bosh (34)	Hassan Whiteside (16)	Dwyane Wade (10)	Staples Center; 19,060	16–21
38	January 13	@ L.A. Lakers	W 78–75	Mario Chalmers (19)	Hassan Whiteside (9)	Mario Chalmers (8)	Staples Center; 18,997	17–21
39	January 14	@ Golden State	L 89–104	Chris Bosh (26)	Hassan Whiteside (12)	Shabazz Napier (6)	Oracle Arena; 19,596	17–22
40	January 16	@ Sacramento	W 95–83	Chris Bosh (30)	Chris Bosh (7)	Shabazz Napier (5)	Sleep Train Arena; 16,350	18–22
41	January 20	Oklahoma City	L 86–94	Dwyane Wade (18)	Chris Bosh (7)	Dwyane Wade (6)	American Airlines Arena; 19,735	18–23
42	January 21	@ Charlotte	L 76–78	Bosh & Wade (17)	Bosh & Wade & Napier (5)	Wade & Napier (4)	Time Warner Cable Arena; 16,914	18–24
43	January 23	Indiana	W 89–87	Luol Deng (23)	Chris Andersen (13)	Dwyane Wade (4)	American Airlines Arena; 19,693	19–24
44	January 25	@ Chicago	W 96–84	Dwyane Wade (26)	Hassan Whiteside (13)	Mario Chalmers (5)	United Center; 21,918	20–24
45	January 27	Milwaukee	L 102–109	Chris Bosh (26)	Hassan Whiteside (16)	Mario Chalmers (8)	American Airlines Arena; 21,918	20–25
46	January 30	Dallas	L 72–93	Hassan Whiteside (16)	Hassan Whiteside (24)	Mario Chalmers (6)	American Airlines Arena; 19,823	20–26

February : 5–7 (home: 2–2; road: 3–5)

Game	Date	Team	Score	High points	High rebounds	High assists	Location Attendance	Record
47	February 1	@ Boston	W 83–75	Hassan Whiteside (20)	Whiteside & Johnson (9)	Cole & Johnson (4)	TD Garden; 19,823	21–26
48	February 3	@ Detroit	L 91–108	Chris Bosh (34)	Hassan Whiteside (10)	Norris Cole (8)	Palace of Auburn Hills; 12,768	21–27
49	February 4	@ Minnesota	L 101–102	Hassan Whiteside (24)	Hassan Whiteside (20)	Shabazz Napier (7)	Target Center; 12,768	21–28
50	February 6	@ San Antonio	L 85–98	Tyler Johnson (18)	James Ennis (8)	Cole & Napier (5)	AT&T Center; 18,581	21–29
51	February 9	New York	W 109–95	Chris Bosh (32)	Hassan Whiteside (9)	Norris Cole (8)	American Airlines Arena; 19,851	22–29
52	February 11	@ Cleveland	L 93–113	Mario Chalmers (18)	Hassan Whiteside (14)	Shabazz Napier (8)	Quicken Loans Arena; 20,562	22–30
All-Star Break
53	February 20	@ New York	W 111–87	Shabazz Napier (18)	Hassan Whiteside (14)	Luol Deng (8)	Madison Square Garden; 19,812	23–30
54	February 21	New Orleans	L 91–105	Mario Chalmers (20)	Hassan Whiteside (16)	Wade & Andersen (4)	American Airlines Arena; 19,982	23–31
55	February 23	Philadelphia	W 119–108	Luol Deng (29)	Hassan Whiteside (14)	Goran Dragić (10)	American Airlines Arena; 19,802	24–31
56	February 25	@ Orlando	W 93–90 (OT)	Luol Deng (21)	Hassan Whiteside (13)	Dwyane Wade (6)	Amway Center; 18,309	25–31
57	February 27	@ New Orleans	L 102–104	Luol Deng (22)	Hassan Whiteside (7)	Dwyane Wade (8)	Smoothie King Center; 17,797	25–32
58	February 28	Atlanta	L 91–93	Dwyane Wade (22)	Hassan Whiteside (24)	Goran Dragić (6)	American Airlines Arena; 19,733	25–33

March : 9–7 (home: 8–2; road: 1–5)

Game	Date	Team	Score	High points	High rebounds	High assists	Location Attendance	Record
59	March 2	Phoenix	W 115–98	Tyler Johnson (26)	Hassan Whiteside (10)	Dwyane Wade (9)	American Airlines Arena; 19,600	26–33
60	March 4	L.A. Lakers	W 100–94	Dwyane Wade (25)	Hassan Whiteside (25)	Dragić & Wade (6)	American Airlines Arena; 19,600	27–33
61	March 6	@ Washington	L 97–99	Goran Dragić (18)	Chris Andersen (6)	Goran Dragić (7)	Verizon Center; 20,356	27–34
62	March 7	Sacramento	W 114–109 (OT)	Dwyane Wade (28)	Michael Beasley (7)	Mario Chalmers (7)	American Airlines Arena; 19,600	28–34
63	March 9	Boston	L 90–100	Dwyane Wade (34)	Hassan Whiteside (9)	Chalmers & Deng (4)	American Airlines Arena; 19,600	28–35
64	March 11	Brooklyn	W 104–98	Dwyane Wade (28)	Chris Andersen (14)	Dwyane Wade (9)	American Airlines Arena; 19,600	29–35
65	March 13	@ Toronto	L 92–102	Dwyane Wade (25)	Hassan Whiteside (5)	Goran Dragić (5)	Air Canada Centre; 19,800	29–36
66	March 16	Cleveland	W 106–92	Dwyane Wade (32)	Hassan Whiteside (11)	Goran Dragić (9)	American Airlines Arena; 19,626	30–36
67	March 18	Portland	W 108–104	Dwyane Wade (32)	Hassan Whiteside (10)	Goran Dragić (11)	American Airlines Arena; 19,621	31–36
68	March 20	Denver	W 108–91	Dwyane Wade (22)	Hassan Whiteside (10)	Michael Beasley (7)	American Airlines Arena; 19,710	32–36
69	March 22	@ Oklahoma City	L 75–93	Hassan Whiteside (13)	Udonis Haslem (7)	Dwyane Wade (4)	Chesapeake Energy Arena; 18,203	32–37
70	March 24	@ Milwaukee	L 88–89	Dwyane Wade (21)	Hassan Whiteside (8)	Goran Dragić (6)	BMO Harris Bradley Center; 12,313	32–38
71	March 25	@ Boston	W 93–86	Goran Dragić (22)	Udonis Haslem (12)	Chalmers & Dragić (7)	TD Garden; 18,624	33–38
72	March 27	@ Atlanta	L 86–99	Luol Deng (17)	Luol Deng (10)	Chalmers & Walker (5)	Philips Arena; 19,233	33–39
73	March 29	Detroit	W 109–102	Dwyane Wade (40)	Udonis Haslem (13)	Goran Dragić (5)	American Airlines Arena; 19,685	34–39
74	March 31	San Antonio	L 81–95	Goran Dragić (19)	Chris Andersen (10)	Chalmers & Dragić (3)	American Airlines Arena; 20,047	34–40

April : 3–5 (home: 2–2; road: 1–3)

Game	Date	Team	Score	High points	High rebounds	High assists	Location Attendance	Record
75	April 2	@ Cleveland	L 88–114	Deng & Whiteside (17)	Deng & Whiteside (8)	Goran Dragić (7)	Quicken Loans Arena; 20,562	34–41
76	April 4	@ Detroit	L 98–99	Dwyane Wade (24)	Hassan Whiteside (12)	Goran Dragić (7)	Palace of Auburn Hills; 16,133	34–42
77	April 5	@ Indiana	L 89–112	Dwyane Wade (27)	Udonis Haslem (10)	Goran Dragić (5)	Bankers Life Fieldhouse; 18,165	34–43
78	April 7	Charlotte	W 105–100	Goran Dragić (28)	Haslem & Whiteside (8)	Dragić & Wade (5)	American Airlines Arena; 19,694	35–43
79	April 9	Chicago	L 78–89	Dwyane Wade (19)	Hassan Whiteside (16)	Luol Deng (4)	American Airlines Arena; 19,641	35–44
80	April 11	Toronto	L 104–107	Dwyane Wade (30)	Hassan Whiteside (18)	Wade & Dragić (5)	American Airlines Arena; 19,689	35–45
81	April 13	Orlando	W 100–93	Hassan Whiteside (24)	Hassan Whiteside (13)	Goran Dragic (8)	American Airlines Arena; 19,600	36–45
82	April 15	@ Philadelphia	W 105–101	Michael Beasley (34)	James Ennis (12)	James Ennis (6)	Wells Fargo Center; 14,476	37–45

2014–15 season schedule

== Player statistics ==
=== Regular season ===
Player	POS	GP	GS	MP	REB	AST	STL	BLK	PTS	MPG	RPG	APG	SPG	BPG	PPG
Mario Chalmers	PG	80	37	2,368	206	307	122	10	813	29.6	2.6	3.8	1.5	.1	10.2
Luol Deng	SF	72	72	2,421	376	139	65	22	1,007	33.6	5.2	1.9	.9	.3	14.0
Dwyane Wade	SG	62	62	1,971	219	299	73	21	1,331	31.8	3.5	4.8	1.2	.3	21.5
Udonis Haslem	PF	62	25	995	258	46	21	13	261	16.0	4.2	.7	.3	.2	4.2
James Ennis III	SF	62	3	1,051	176	48	25	17	312	17.0	2.8	.8	.4	.3	5.0
Chris Andersen	C	60	20	1,132	299	43	26	61	320	18.9	5.0	.7	.4	1.0	5.3
Shabazz Napier	PG	51	10	1,012	113	130	40	4	261	19.8	2.2	2.5	.8	.1	5.1
Hassan Whiteside	C	48	32	1,142	482	6	27	123	564	23.8	10.0	.1	.6	2.6	11.8
Norris Cole^{†}	PG	47	23	1,148	108	165	42	8	295	24.4	2.3	3.5	.9	.2	6.3
Chris Bosh	C	44	44	1,556	310	95	41	25	928	35.4	7.0	2.2	.9	.6	21.1
Shawne Williams^{†}	SF	44	22	924	139	36	21	17	292	21.0	3.2	.8	.5	.4	6.6
Tyler Johnson	SG	32	2	603	81	42	33	9	190	18.8	2.5	1.3	1.0	.3	5.9
Danny Granger	SF	30	6	613	80	17	13	6	188	20.4	2.7	.6	.4	.2	6.3
Goran Dragić^{†}	PG	26	26	905	89	139	28	6	432	34.8	3.4	5.3	1.1	.2	16.6
Henry Walker	SF	24	13	628	82	29	24	9	175	26.2	3.4	1.2	1.0	.4	7.3
Justin Hamilton^{†}	C	24	5	289	48	12	8	5	66	12.0	2.0	.5	.3	.2	2.8
Michael Beasley	PF	24	1	505	89	32	15	13	212	21.0	3.7	1.3	.6	.5	8.8
Josh McRoberts	PF	17	4	296	45	33	12	3	72	17.4	2.6	1.9	.7	.2	4.2
Zoran Dragić^{†}	SG	10	1	62	5	4	2	0	22	6.2	.5	.4	.2	.0	2.2
Shannon Brown	SG	5	2	89	1	3	4	0	20	17.8	.2	.6	.8	.0	4.0
Andre Dawkins	SG	4	0	22	2	1	0	0	3	5.5	.5	.3	.0	.0	.8

- ^{†} Denotes player spent time with another team in the season. Stats reflect time with the Heat only.

== Injuries ==
Player	Duration		Injury type	Games missed
Player	Start	End	Injury type	Games missed

Josh McRoberts
Chris Bosh
Shabazz Napier

== Roster ==
2014–15 Miami Heat roster
Players

Pos.	No.	Player	Height	Weight	DOB	From
C	11	Chris Andersen	6 ft 10 in (2.08 m)	245 lb (111 kg)	1978-07-07	Blinn
F	30	Michael Beasley	6 ft 9 in (2.06 m)	235 lb (107 kg)	1989-01-09	Kansas State
F/C	1	Chris Bosh	6 ft 11 in (2.11 m)	235 lb (107 kg)	1984-03-24	Georgia Tech
G	15	Mario Chalmers	6 ft 2 in (1.88 m)	190 lb (86 kg)	1986-05-19	Kansas
F	9	Luol Deng	6 ft 9 in (2.06 m)	220 lb (100 kg)	1985-04-16	Duke
G	7	Goran Dragić	6 ft 3 in (1.91 m)	190 lb (86 kg)	1986-05-06	Slovenia
G	12	Zoran Dragić	6 ft 5 in (1.96 m)	200 lb (91 kg)	1989-06-22	Slovenia
F	32	James Ennis	6 ft 7 in (2.01 m)	208 lb (94 kg)	1990-07-01	Long Beach State
F	40	Udonis Haslem	6 ft 8 in (2.03 m)	235 lb (107 kg)	1980-06-09	Florida
G	8	Tyler Johnson	6 ft 4 in (1.93 m)	186 lb (84 kg)	1992-05-07	Fresno State
F	4	Josh McRoberts	6 ft 10 in (2.08 m)	240 lb (109 kg)	1987-02-28	Duke
G	13	Shabazz Napier	6 ft 1 in (1.85 m)	170 lb (77 kg)	1991-07-14	Connecticut
G	3	Dwyane Wade	6 ft 4 in (1.93 m)	220 lb (100 kg)	1982-01-17	Marquette
F	5	Henry Walker	6 ft 6 in (1.98 m)	220 lb (100 kg)	1987-10-09	Kansas State
C	21	Hassan Whiteside	7 ft 0 in (2.13 m)	260 lb (118 kg)	1989-06-13	Marshall

Coaches
Head coach
- Erik Spoelstra
Assistant(s)
- Dan Craig
- Keith Smart
- Juwan Howard
- David Fizdale (associate head coach)
- Chris Quinn (player development)

Legend
- (DP) Unsigned draft pick
- (FA) Free agent
- (S) Suspended
- (DL) On assignment to D-League affiliate
- Injured

Roster
Updated: 2015–03–18

== Transactions ==
=== Free agents ===
==== Re-signed ====
Signed	Contract	Ref.

==== Additions ====
Signed	Miami Heat	Ref.

==== Subtractions ====
LeBron James Cleveland Cavaliers

== Awards ==
James Ennis	Award	1/31/15	Ref.
