= 2014–15 Washington Wizards season =

Season of National Basketball Association team the Washington Wizards

- Head coach: Randy Wittman
- General manager: Ernie Grunfeld
- Owners: Monumental Sports & Entertainment
- Arena: Verizon Center

Results
- Record: 46–36 (.561)
- Place: Division: 2nd (Southeast); Conference: 5th (Eastern)
- Playoff finish: Conference Semifinals (lost to Hawks 2–4)
- Stats at Basketball Reference

Local media
- Television: CSN Mid-Atlantic; The CW Washington; TBD TV
- Radio: 106.7 The Fan

The 2014–15 Washington Wizards season was the 54th season of the franchise in the National Basketball Association (NBA) and 42nd in the Washington, D.C. area. The Wizards recorded their best regular season record since 1978–79 and secured a place in the NBA playoffs, but despite sweeping the Toronto Raptors in their first round playoff series, they were eliminated in a 2–4 loss in the Eastern Conference semifinals by the top-seeded Atlanta Hawks.

== Preseason ==
=== Draft picks ===
| Round | Pick | Player | Position | Nationality | College |
|---|---|---|---|---|---|
| 2 | 46 | Jordan Clarkson | PG | United States | Missouri |

== Regular season ==
=== Standings ===
| Southeast Division | W | L | PCT | GB | Home | Road | Div | GP |
|---|---|---|---|---|---|---|---|---|
| c-Atlanta Hawks | 60 | 22 | .732 | – | 35‍–‍6 | 25‍–‍16 | 12–4 | 82 |
| x-Washington Wizards | 46 | 36 | .561 | 14.0 | 29‍–‍12 | 17‍–‍24 | 10–6 | 82 |
| Miami Heat | 37 | 45 | .451 | 23.0 | 20‍–‍21 | 17‍–‍24 | 6–10 | 82 |
| Charlotte Hornets | 33 | 49 | .402 | 27.0 | 19‍–‍22 | 14‍–‍27 | 8–8 | 82 |
| Orlando Magic | 25 | 57 | .305 | 35.0 | 13‍–‍28 | 12‍–‍29 | 4–12 | 82 |

Eastern Conference
| # | Team | W | L | PCT | GB | GP |
|---|---|---|---|---|---|---|
| 1 | c-Atlanta Hawks * | 60 | 22 | .732 | – | 82 |
| 2 | y-Cleveland Cavaliers * | 53 | 29 | .646 | 7.0 | 82 |
| 3 | x-Chicago Bulls | 50 | 32 | .610 | 10.0 | 82 |
| 4 | y-Toronto Raptors * | 49 | 33 | .598 | 11.0 | 82 |
| 5 | x-Washington Wizards | 46 | 36 | .561 | 14.0 | 82 |
| 6 | x-Milwaukee Bucks | 41 | 41 | .500 | 19.0 | 82 |
| 7 | x-Boston Celtics | 40 | 42 | .488 | 20.0 | 82 |
| 8 | x-Brooklyn Nets | 38 | 44 | .463 | 22.0 | 82 |
| 9 | Indiana Pacers | 38 | 44 | .463 | 22.0 | 82 |
| 10 | Miami Heat | 37 | 45 | .451 | 23.0 | 82 |
| 11 | Charlotte Hornets | 33 | 49 | .402 | 27.0 | 82 |
| 12 | Detroit Pistons | 32 | 50 | .390 | 28.0 | 82 |
| 13 | Orlando Magic | 25 | 57 | .305 | 35.0 | 82 |
| 14 | Philadelphia 76ers | 18 | 64 | .220 | 42.0 | 82 |
| 15 | New York Knicks | 17 | 65 | .207 | 43.0 | 82 |

== Game log ==
=== Regular season ===
2014–15 game log
Total: 46–36 (home: 29–12; road: 17–24)
October: 1–1 (home: 0–0; road: 1–1)

| Game | Date | Team | Score | High points | High rebounds | High assists | Location Attendance | Record |
|---|---|---|---|---|---|---|---|---|
| 1 | October 29 | @ Miami | L 95–107 | Drew Gooden; Marcin Gortat (18) | Marcin Gortat; Garrett Temple (7) | John Wall (11) | AmericanAirlines Arena; 19,744 | 0–1 |
| 2 | October 30 | @ Orlando | W 105–98 | John Wall (30) | Marcin Gortat (12) | John Wall (12) | Amway Center; 18,846 | 1–1 |

November : 9–4 (home: 6–2; road: 3–2)

| Game | Date | Team | Score | High points | High rebounds | High assists | Location Attendance | Record |
|---|---|---|---|---|---|---|---|---|
| 3 | November 1 | Milwaukee | W 108–97 | Nenê (22) | Marcin Gortat (9) | John Wall (10) | Verizon Center; 17,992 | 2–1 |
| 4 | November 4 | @ New York | W 98–83 | Pierce & Temple (17) | Nenê, Gortat & Porter (7) | John Wall (7) | Madison Square Garden; 19,812 | 3–1 |
| 5 | November 5 | Indiana | W 96–94 (OT) | John Wall (31) | Marcin Gortat (10) | John Wall (10) | Verizon Center; 15,268 | 4–1 |
| 6 | November 7 | @ Toronto | L 84–103 | Otto Porter (13) | Marcin Gortat (10) | John Wall (7) | Air Canada Centre; 19,800 | 4–2 |
| 7 | November 8 | @ Indiana | W 97–90 | John Wall (18) | Kris Humphries (9) | Nenê (5) | Bankers Life Fieldhouse; 17,302 | 5–2 |
| 8 | November 12 | Detroit | W 107–103 | John Wall (27) | Marcin Gortat (13) | John Wall (11) | Verizon Center; 14,708 | 6–2 |
| 9 | November 15 | Orlando | W 98–93 | Nenê & Humphries (16) | Marcin Gortat (7) | John Wall (10) | Verizon Center; 19,110 | 7–2 |
| 10 | November 19 | Dallas | L 102–105 | Bradley Beal (21) | Gortat, Wall & Humphries (6) | John Wall (11) | Verizon Center; 16,374 | 7–3 |
| 11 | November 21 | Cleveland | W 91–78 | John Wall (28) | Nenê (7) | John Wall (7) | Verizon Center; 20,356 | 8–3 |
| 12 | November 22 | @ Milwaukee | W 111–100 | Paul Pierce (25) | Marcin Gortat (13) | John Wall (9) | BMO Harris Bradley Center; 14,254 | 9–3 |
| 13 | November 25 | Atlanta | L 102–106 | John Wall (21) | Marcin Gortat (11) | John Wall (13) | Verizon Center; 15,440 | 9–4 |
| 14 | November 26 | @ Cleveland | L 87–113 | Rasual Butler (23) | John Wall (4) | John Wall (7) | Quicken Loans Arena; 20,562 | 9–5 |
| 15 | November 29 | New Orleans | W 83–80 | Marcin Gortat (24) | Marcin Gortat (13) | John Wall (7) | Verizon Center; 17,581 | 10–5 |

December : 12–4 (home: 8–2; road: 4–2)

| Game | Date | Team | Score | High points | High rebounds | High assists | Location Attendance | Record |
|---|---|---|---|---|---|---|---|---|
| 16 | December 1 | Miami | W 107–86 | Rasual Butler (23) | Marcin Gortat (10) | John Wall (13) | Verizon Center; 15,150 | 11–5 |
| 17 | December 3 | L.A. Lakers | W 111–95 | Bradley Beal (21) | Kris Humphries (20) | John Wall (15) | Verizon Center; 18,490 | 12–5 |
| 18 | December 5 | Denver | W 119–89 | Kris Humphries (20) | Wall & Nenê (8) | John Wall (12) | Verizon Center; 19,451 | 13–5 |
| 19 | December 7 | @ Boston | L 93–101 | Rasual Butler (22) | Kris Humphries (14) | John Wall (14) | TD Garden; 16,716 | 13–6 |
| 20 | December 8 | Boston | W 133–132 (2OT) | Paul Pierce (28) | Marcin Gortat (12) | John Wall (17) | Verizon Center; 14,828 | 14–6 |
| 21 | December 10 | @ Orlando | W 91–89 | John Wall (21) | Pierce, Wall & Nenê (6) | John Wall (11) | Amway Center; 16,081 | 15–6 |
| 22 | December 12 | L.A. Clippers | W 104–96 | Bradley Beal (29) | Kris Humphries (8) | John Wall (11) | Verizon Center; 17,437 | 16–6 |
| 23 | December 14 | Utah | W 93–84 | Bradley Beal (22) | Gortat & Beal (7) | John Wall (8) | Verizon Center; 15,220 | 17–6 |
| 24 | December 16 | Minnesota | W 109–95 | Rasual Butler (23) | Kris Humphries (10) | John Wall (17) | Verizon Center; 15,823 | 18–6 |
| 25 | December 19 | @ Miami | W 105–103 | Wall & Nenê (20) | Gortat & Beal (7) | John Wall (10) | American Airlines Arena; 19,600 | 19–6 |
| 26 | December 21 | Phoenix | L 92–104 | Rasual Butler (17) | Gortat & Beal (7) | John Wall (8) | Verizon Center; 18,207 | 19–7 |
| 27 | December 23 | Chicago | L 91–99 | John Wall (18) | Gortat (11) | John Wall (9) | Verizon Center; 20,356 | 19–8 |
| 28 | December 25 | @ New York | W 102–91 | John Wall (24) | Gortat (9) | John Wall (11) | Madison Square Garden; 19,812 | 20–8 |
| 29 | December 27 | Boston | W 101–88 | Paul Pierce (17) | Gortat (10) | Wall & Miller (7) | Verizon Center; 20,356 | 21–8 |
| 30 | December 29 | @ Houston | W 104–103 | Bradley Beal (33) | Marcin Gortat (7) | John Wall (12) | Toyota Center; 18,322 | 22–8 |
| 31 | December 30 | @ Dallas | L 87–114 | John Wall (11) | Kris Humphries (7) | John Wall (8) | American Airlines Center; 20,397 | 22–9 |

January : 9–8 (home: 4–3; road: 5–5)

| Game | Date | Team | Score | High points | High rebounds | High assists | Location Attendance | Record |
|---|---|---|---|---|---|---|---|---|
| 32 | January 2 | @ Oklahoma City | L 102–109 | Bradley Beal (21) | Bradley Beal (10) | John Wall (12) | Chesapeake Energy Arena; 18,203 | 22–10 |
| 33 | January 3 | @ San Antonio | L 92–101 | Beal & Wall (15) | Kris Humphries (8) | John Wall (8) | AT&T Center; 18,581 | 22–11 |
| 34 | January 5 | @ New Orleans | W 92–85 | John Wall (15) | Nenê & Porter (7) | John Wall (12) | Smoothie King Center; 16,182 | 23–11 |
| 35 | January 7 | New York | W 101–91 | Nenê (20) | Marcin Gortat (11) | John Wall (8) | Verizon Center; 16,902 | 24–11 |
| 36 | January 9 | Chicago | W 102–86 | Marcin Gortat (21) | Marcin Gortat (13) | John Wall (12) | Verizon Center; 20,356 | 25–11 |
| 37 | January 11 | @ Atlanta | L 86–102 | John Wall (15) | Nenê & Seraphin (6) | John Wall (8) | Philips Arena; 18,057 | 25–12 |
| 38 | January 13 | San Antonio | W 101–93 | John Wall (25) | Marcin Gortat (11) | John Wall (8) | Verizon Center; 18,116 | 26–12 |
| 39 | January 14 | @ Chicago | W 105–99 | Paul Pierce (22) | Gortat & Humphries (9) | John Wall (9) | United Center; 21,498 | 27–12 |
| 40 | January 16 | Brooklyn | L 80–102 | John Wall (13) | Kris Humphries (8) | John Wall (6) | Verizon Center; 17,788 | 27–13 |
| 41 | January 17 | @ Brooklyn | W 99–90 | Nenê (20) | Marcin Gortat (16) | Bradley Beal (8) | Barclays Center; 17,732 | 28–13 |
| 42 | January 19 | Philadelphia | W 111–76 | Marcin Gortat (20) | Humphries & Seraphin (9) | John Wall (10) | Verizon Center; 19,040 | 29–13 |
| 43 | January 21 | Oklahoma City | L 103–105 (OT) | Nenê (24) | Paul Pierce (12) | John Wall (13) | Verizon Center; 20,356 | 29–14 |
| 44 | January 24 | @ Portland | L 96–103 | John Wall (25) | Marcin Gortat (7) | John Wall (9) | Moda Center; 19,775 | 29–15 |
| 45 | January 25 | @ Denver | W 117–115 (OT) | Kris Humphries (21) | Kris Humphries (14) | John Wall (16) | Pepsi Center; 15,410 | 30–15 |
| 46 | January 27 | @ L.A. Lakers | W 98–92 | John Wall (21) | Kris Humphries (11) | John Wall (13) | Staples Center; 18,997 | 31–15 |
| 47 | January 28 | @ Phoenix | L 98–106 | Gortat & Porter (14) | Kris Humphries (15) | John Wall (7) | US Airways Center; 16,209 | 31–16 |
| 48 | January 31 | Toronto | L 116–120 (OT) | John Wall (28) | Kris Humphries (14) | John Wall (12) | Verizon Center; 20,356 | 31–17 |

February : 3–9 (home: 3–4; road: 0–5)

| Game | Date | Team | Score | High points | High rebounds | High assists | Location Attendance | Record |
|---|---|---|---|---|---|---|---|---|
| 49 | February 2 | Charlotte | L 88–92 | Bradley Beal (18) | Bradley Beal (11) | John Wall (10) | Verizon Center; 15,816 | 31–18 |
| 50 | February 4 | @ Atlanta | L 96–105 | John Wall (24) | Marcin Gortat (9) | John Wall (9) | Philips Arena; 18,047 | 31–19 |
| 51 | February 5 | @ Charlotte | L 87–94 | Paul Pierce (19) | Marcin Gortat (7) | John Wall (13) | Time Warner Cable Arena; 17,019 | 31–20 |
| 52 | February 7 | Brooklyn | W 114–77 | John Wall (17) | Kris Humphries (11) | John Wall (7) | Verizon Center; 15,816 | 32–20 |
| 53 | February 9 | Orlando | W 96–80 | Rasual Butler (15) | Marcin Gortat (14) | John Wall (10) | Verizon Center; 16,031 | 33–20 |
| 54 | February 11 | @ Toronto | L 93–95 | John Wall (21) | Drew Gooden (12) | John Wall (8) | Air Canada Centre; 19,800 | 33–21 |
All-Star Break
| 55 | February 20 | Cleveland | L 89–127 | Wall & Nenê (18) | Gortat & Humphries (6) | John Wall (9) | Verizon Center; 20,356 | 33–22 |
| 56 | February 22 | @ Detroit | L 89–106 | Gortat (24) | Gortat (10) | John Wall (12) | The Palace of Auburn Hills; 18,371 | 33–23 |
| 57 | February 24 | Golden State | L 107–114 | Paul Pierce (25) | Marcin Gortat (11) | John Wall (11) | Verizon Center; 20,356 | 33–24 |
| 58 | February 25 | Minnesota | L 77–97 | Otto Porter Jr. (13) | Marcin Gortat (15) | John Wall (10) | Target Center; 19,856 | 33–25 |
| 59 | February 27 | @ Philadelphia | L 81–89 | John Wall (21) | Marcin Gortat (14) | John Wall (11) | Wells Fargo Center; 18,089 | 33–26 |
| 60 | February 28 | Detroit | W 99–95 | John Wall (22) | Marcin Gortat (17) | John Wall (6) | Verizon Center; 20,356 | 34–26 |

March : 7–7 (home: 5–2; road: 2–5)

| Game | Date | Team | Score | High points | High rebounds | High assists | Location Attendance | Record |
|---|---|---|---|---|---|---|---|---|
| 61 | March 3 | @ Chicago | L 92–97 | John Wall (21) | Marcin Gortat (12) | John Wall (11) | United Center; 21,468 | 34–27 |
| 62 | March 6 | Miami | W 99–97 | Nenê (20) | Marcin Gortat (17) | John Wall (12) | Verizon Center; 20,356 | 35–27 |
| 63 | March 7 | @ Milwaukee | L 85–91 | Paul Pierce (14) | Drew Gooden (10) | John Wall (6) | BMO Harris Bradley Center; 16,216 | 35–28 |
| 64 | March 9 | @ Charlotte | W 95–69 | Marcin Gortat (20) | Kevin Seraphin & Marcin Gortat (7) | John Wall (9) | Time Warner Cable Arena; 15,119 | 36–28 |
| 65 | March 12 | Memphis | W 107–87 | Marcin Gortat (22) | Marcin Gortat (9) | John Wall & Sessions (6) | Verizon Center; 18,186 | 37–28 |
| 66 | March 14 | Sacramento | W 113–97 | John Wall (31) | Drew Gooden (9) | John Wall (12) | Verizon Center; 20,356 | 38–28 |
| 67 | March 16 | Portland | W 105–97 | John Wall (21) | Gortat & Wall (9) | John Wall (11) | Verizon Center; 17,324 | 39–28 |
| 68 | March 18 | @ Utah | W 88–84 | John Wall (24) | Gortat & Wall (9) | John Wall (6) | Energy Solutions Arena; 19,498 | 40–28 |
| 69 | March 20 | @ L.A. Clippers | L 99–113 | John Wall (19) | Nene Hilario (7) | John Wall (10) | Staples Center; 19,218 | 40–29 |
| 70 | March 22 | @ Sacramento | L 86–109 | Bradley Beal (19) | Marcin Gortat (7) | John Wall (8) | Sleep Train Arena; 17,008 | 40–30 |
| 71 | March 23 | @ Golden State | L 76–107 | Beal & Seraphin & Sessions (12) | Kevin Seraphin (8) | John Wall (5) | Oracle Arena; 19,596 | 40–31 |
| 72 | March 25 | Indiana | L 101–103 | John Wall (34) | Kevin Seraphin & Marcin Gortat (7) | John Wall (6) | Verizon Center; 18,514 | 40–32 |
| 73 | March 27 | Charlotte | W 110–107 (2OT) | John Wall (32) | Drew Gooden (17) | Beal & Wall (6) | Verizon Center; 18,441 | 41–32 |
| 74 | March 29 | Houston | L 91–99 | John Wall (25) | Marcin Gortat (10) | John Wall (12) | Verizon Center; 20,356 | 41–33 |

April : 5–3 (home: 3–0; road: 2–3)

| Game | Date | Team | Score | High points | High rebounds | High assists | Location Attendance | Record |
|---|---|---|---|---|---|---|---|---|
| 75 | April 1 | Philadelphia | W 106–93 | Marcin Gortat (23) | Marcin Gortat (14) | John Wall (15) | Verizon Center; 17,501 | 42–33 |
| 76 | April 3 | New York | W 101–87 | Marcin Gortat (19) | Drew Gooden (13) | John Wall (18) | Verizon Center; 19,389 | 43–33 |
| 77 | April 4 | @ Memphis | W 92–83 | Bradley Beal (20) | Marcin Gortat (8) | John Wall (14) | FedExForum; 18,119 | 44–33 |
| 78 | April 8 | @ Philadelphia | W 119–90 | Bradley Beal (21) | Gortat & Humphries (7) | Sessions & Bynum (7) | Wells Fargo Center; 12,611 | 45–33 |
| 79 | April 10 | @ Brooklyn | L 80–117 | Bradley Beal (24) | Marcin Gortat (16) | John Wall (10) | Barclays Center; 17,732 | 45–34 |
| 80 | April 12 | Atlanta | W 108–99 | John Wall (24) | Nene Hilario (10) | John Wall (9) | Verizon Center; 19,041 | 46–34 |
| 81 | April 14 | @ Indiana | L 95–99 (2OT) | Beal & Gortat (19) | Gooden & Gortat (10) | John Wall (11) | Bankers Life Fieldhouse; 18,165 | 46–35 |
| 82 | April 15 | @ Cleveland | L 108–113 (OT) | Martell Webster (20) | Kevin Seraphin (12) | Will Bynum (8) | Quicken Loans Arena; 20,562 | 46–36 |

2014–15 season schedule

== Playoffs ==
=== Game log ===
2015 playoff game log
Total: 6–4 (home: 3–2; road: 3–2)
First Round: 4–0 (home: 2–0; road: 2–0)

| Game | Date | Team | Score | High points | High rebounds | High assists | Location Attendance | Series |
|---|---|---|---|---|---|---|---|---|
| 1 | April 18 | @ Toronto | W 93–86 (OT) | Paul Pierce (20) | Nenê (13) | John Wall (8) | Air Canada Centre; 19,800 | 1–0 |
| 2 | April 21 | @ Toronto | W 117–106 | Bradley Beal (28) | Nenê & Porter (9) | John Wall (17) | Air Canada Centre; 19,800 | 2–0 |
| 3 | April 24 | Toronto | W 106–99 | Marcin Gortat (24) | Marcin Gortat (13) | John Wall (15) | Verizon Center; 20,356 | 3–0 |
| 4 | April 26 | Toronto | W 125–94 | Bradley Beal (23) | Marcin Gortat (11) | John Wall (10) | Verizon Center; 20,356 | 4–0 |

Conference Semifinals: 2–4 (home: 1–2; road: 1–2)

| Game | Date | Team | Score | High points | High rebounds | High assists | Location Attendance | Series |
|---|---|---|---|---|---|---|---|---|
| 1 | May 3 | @ Atlanta | W 104–98 | Bradley Beal (28) | Marcin Gortat (12) | John Wall (13) | Philips Arena; 18,148 | 1–0 |
| 2 | May 5 | @ Atlanta | L 90–106 | Ramon Sessions (21) | Marcin Gortat (9) | Bradley Beal (7) | Philips Arena; 18,131 | 1–1 |
| 3 | May 9 | Atlanta | W 103–101 | Beal, Nene, Porter Jr. (17) | Otto Porter Jr. (9) | Bradley Beal (8) | Verizon Center; 20,356 | 2–1 |
| 4 | May 11 | Atlanta | L 101–106 | Bradley Beal (34) | Marcin Gortat (8) | Bradley Beal (7) | Verizon Center; 20,356 | 2–2 |
| 5 | May 13 | @ Atlanta | L 81–82 | Bradley Beal (23) | Otto Porter Jr. (10) | John Wall (7) | Philips Arena; 18,854 | 2–3 |
| 6 | May 15 | Atlanta | L 91–94 | Bradley Beal (29) | Nene Hilario (11) | John Wall (13) | Verizon Center; 20,356 | 2–4 |

2015 playoff schedule

== Player statistics ==
Legend
| GP | Games played | GS | Games started | MPG | Minutes per game |
| FG% | Field-goal percentage | 3P% | 3-point field-goal percentage | FT% | Free-throw percentage |
| RPG | Rebounds per game | APG | Assists per game | SPG | Steals per game |
| BPG | Blocks per game | PPG | Points per game |

=== Regular season ===
Washington Wizards statistics
| Player | GP | GS | MPG | FG% | 3P% | FT% | RPG | APG | SPG | BPG | PPG |
|---|---|---|---|---|---|---|---|---|---|---|---|
| Marcin Gortat | 82 | 82 | 29.9 | .566 | .000 | .703 | 8.7 | 1.2 | .6 | 1.3 | 12.2 |
| John Wall | 79 | 79 | 35.9 | .445 | .300 | .785 | 4.6 | 10.0 | 1.7 | .6 | 17.6 |
| Kevin Séraphin | 79 | 0 | 15.6 | .513 | .000 | .707 | 3.6 | .7 | .1 | .7 | 6.6 |
| Rasual Butler | 75 | 1 | 20.1 | .422 | .387 | .791 | 2.6 | .8 | .4 | .3 | 7.7 |
| Otto Porter Jr. | 74 | 13 | 19.4 | .450 | .337 | .734 | 3.0 | .9 | .6 | .4 | 6.0 |
| Paul Pierce | 73 | 73 | 26.2 | .447 | .389 | .781 | 4.0 | 2.0 | .6 | .3 | 11.9 |
| Nenê | 67 | 58 | 25.3 | .511 | .200 | .604 | 5.1 | 1.8 | 1.0 | .3 | 11.0 |
| Kris Humphries | 64 | 17 | 21.0 | .473 | .000 | .744 | 6.5 | .9 | .5 | .4 | 8.0 |
| Bradley Beal | 63 | 59 | 33.4 | .427 | .409 | .783 | 3.8 | 3.1 | 1.2 | .3 | 15.3 |
| Garrett Temple | 52 | 18 | 14.1 | .400 | .375 | .729 | 1.7 | 1.1 | .8 | .2 | 3.9 |
| Drew Gooden | 51 | 7 | 16.9 | .399 | .390 | .773 | 4.4 | 1.0 | .4 | .2 | 5.4 |
| Andre Miller^{†} | 51 | 0 | 12.4 | .542 | .125 | .718 | 1.5 | 2.8 | .3 | .0 | 3.6 |
| Martell Webster | 32 | 0 | 11.0 | .264 | .233 | .750 | 1.4 | .5 | .2 | .0 | 3.3 |
| DeJuan Blair | 29 | 0 | 6.2 | .456 | | .667 | 1.9 | .1 | .2 | .0 | 1.9 |
| Ramon Sessions^{†} | 28 | 3 | 19.5 | .411 | .406 | .812 | 2.7 | 3.1 | .6 | .0 | 7.4 |
| Will Bynum | 7 | 0 | 9.6 | .323 | .000 | .500 | .9 | 2.6 | .1 | .1 | 3.1 |
| Glen Rice Jr. | 5 | 0 | 8.6 | .200 | .143 | .667 | .8 | .4 | .0 | .0 | 2.2 |
| Toure' Murry^{†} | 4 | 0 | 4.3 | .500 | | 1.000 | .3 | .3 | .3 | .0 | 1.5 |

=== Playoffs ===
Washington Wizards statistics
| Player | GP | GS | MPG | FG% | 3P% | FT% | RPG | APG | SPG | BPG | PPG |
|---|---|---|---|---|---|---|---|---|---|---|---|
| Bradley Beal | 10 | 10 | 41.8 | .405 | .365 | .831 | 5.5 | 4.6 | 1.6 | .7 | 23.4 |
| Marcin Gortat | 10 | 10 | 30.7 | .628 | | .667 | 8.8 | 2.2 | .6 | 1.1 | 12.4 |
| Paul Pierce | 10 | 10 | 29.8 | .485 | .524 | .850 | 4.2 | .9 | .6 | .7 | 14.6 |
| Nenê | 10 | 10 | 25.7 | .447 | | .478 | 6.6 | 1.5 | .9 | .3 | 7.9 |
| Ramon Sessions | 10 | 3 | 21.8 | .371 | .400 | .684 | 2.4 | 2.3 | .4 | .1 | 7.5 |
| Otto Porter Jr. | 10 | 0 | 33.1 | .443 | .375 | .476 | 8.0 | 1.8 | 1.2 | .2 | 10.0 |
| Drew Gooden | 10 | 0 | 17.8 | .377 | .462 | .769 | 5.5 | .8 | .2 | 1.0 | 6.8 |
| John Wall | 7 | 7 | 39.0 | .391 | .176 | .846 | 4.7 | 11.9 | 1.4 | 1.4 | 17.4 |
| Kevin Séraphin | 6 | 0 | 12.0 | .484 | | .500 | 3.2 | .3 | .3 | .2 | 5.5 |
| Garrett Temple | 4 | 0 | 6.5 | .167 | .000 | .625 | .8 | .3 | .5 | .0 | 1.8 |
| Will Bynum | 3 | 0 | 10.3 | .500 | .500 | .800 | 1.0 | 1.0 | .7 | .3 | 6.3 |
| Rasual Butler | 2 | 0 | 3.5 | .000 | .000 | | .5 | .5 | .0 | .0 | .0 |
| Kris Humphries | 1 | 0 | 5.0 | 1.000 | | | 3.0 | .0 | .0 | .0 | 2.0 |
| Martell Webster | 1 | 0 | 4.0 | .500 | .000 | | .0 | .0 | .0 | .0 | 2.0 |

- ^{†} Denotes player spent time with another team in the season. Stats reflect time with the Wizards only.

== Injuries ==
| Player | Duration | | Injury type | Games missed |
| Player | Start | End | Injury type | Games missed |
|---|---|---|---|---|
| Bradley Beal | February 5, 2015 | TBD | Stressed lower-right fibula; toe | TBD |
| Paul Pierce | February 24, 2015 | TBD | Knee | TBD |
| Kris Humphries | February 25, 2015 | TBD | Hamstring | TBD |

== Roster ==
2014–15 Washington Wizards roster
Players

| Pos. | No. | Player | Height | Weight | DOB | From |
|---|---|---|---|---|---|---|
| SG | 3 | Bradley Beal | 6 ft 3 in (1.91 m) | 207 lb (94 kg) | 1993-06-28 | Florida |
| PF | 45 | DeJuan Blair | 6 ft 7 in (2.01 m) | 270 lb (122 kg) | 1989-04-22 | Pittsburgh |
| SF | 8 | Rasual Butler | 6 ft 7 in (2.01 m) | 215 lb (98 kg) | 1979-05-23 | La Salle |
| SG | 1 | Will Bynum | 6 ft 0 in (1.83 m) | 185 lb (84 kg) | 1983-01-04 | Georgia Tech |
| PF | 90 | Drew Gooden | 6 ft 10 in (2.08 m) | 250 lb (113 kg) | 1981-09-24 | Kansas |
| C | 4 | Marcin Gortat | 6 ft 11 in (2.11 m) | 240 lb (109 kg) | 1984-02-17 | Poland |
| PF | 43 | Kris Humphries | 6 ft 10 in (2.08 m) | 235 lb (107 kg) | 1985-02-06 | Minnesota |
| PF | 42 | Nenê | 6 ft 11 in (2.11 m) | 250 lb (113 kg) | 1982-09-13 | Brazil |
| SF | 34 | Paul Pierce | 6 ft 7 in (2.01 m) | 235 lb (107 kg) | 1977-10-13 | Kansas |
| SF | 22 | Otto Porter | 6 ft 8 in (2.03 m) | 198 lb (90 kg) | 1993-06-03 | Georgetown |
| C | 13 | Kevin Séraphin | 6 ft 9 in (2.06 m) | 275 lb (125 kg) | 1989-12-07 | France |
| PG | 7 | Ramon Sessions | 6 ft 3 in (1.91 m) | 190 lb (86 kg) | 1986-04-11 | Nevada |
| SG | 17 | Garrett Temple | 6 ft 6 in (1.98 m) | 195 lb (88 kg) | 1986-05-08 | LSU |
| PG | 2 | John Wall | 6 ft 4 in (1.93 m) | 195 lb (88 kg) | 1990-09-06 | Kentucky |
| SF | 9 | Martell Webster | 6 ft 7 in (2.01 m) | 230 lb (104 kg) | 1986-12-04 | Seattle Preparatory (WA) |

Coaches
Head coach
- Randy Wittman
Assistant(s)
- David Adkins (player development)
- Don Newman
- Don Zierden
- Roy Rogers
- Pat Sullivan
- Howard Eisley
- Eric Waters (trainer)

Legend
- (DP) Unsigned draft pick
- (FA) Free agent
- (S) Suspended
- (DL) On assignment to D-League affiliate
- Injured

Roster
Updated: April 6, 2015

== Transactions ==
=== Trades ===
| February 19, 2015 | To Washington Wizards Ramon Sessions | To Sacramento Kings Andre Miller |

=== Free agents ===
==== Re-signed ====
| Player | Signed | Contract | Ref. |
|---|---|---|---|
| Marcin Gortat | July 10, 2014 | 5 years, $60,000,000 | |
| Drew Gooden | July 18, 2014 | 1 year, $1,448,000 | |
| Garrett Temple | July 18, 2014 | 2 years, $2,081,686 | |
| Kevin Seraphin | July 18, 2014 | 1 year, $3,898,692 | |

==== Additions ====
| Player | Signed | Former team | Contract | Ref. |
|---|---|---|---|---|
| Paul Pierce | July 15, 2014 | Brooklyn Nets | 2 years, $11,000,000 | |
| Kris Humphries | July 15, 2014 | Boston Celtics | 3 years, $13,000,000 | |
| DeJuan Blair | July 16, 2014 | Dallas Mavericks | 3 years, $6,000,000 | |
| Rasual Butler | September 22, 2014 | Indiana Pacers | 1 year, $1,448,490 | |

==== Subtractions ====
| Player | Reason left | Date | New team | Contract | Ref. |
|---|---|---|---|---|---|
| Trevor Ariza | Free Agent | July 12, 2014 | Houston Rockets | 4 years, $32,000,000 | |
| Trevor Booker | Free Agent | July 21, 2014 | Utah Jazz | 2 years, $9,775,000 | |
| Al Harrington | Free Agent | | Fujian Sturgeons (Chinese Basketball Association) | | |
| Chris Singleton | Free Agent | | | | |

== Awards ==
| Player | Award | Date awarded | Ref. |
