= 2014–15 Sacramento Kings season =

NBA professional basketball team season

- Head coach: Michael Malone until Dec. '14; Tyrone Corbin Dec. '14 - Feb. '15; George Karl
- General manager: Pete D'Alessandro
- Owner: Vivek Ranadivé
- Arena: Sleep Train Arena

Results
- Record: 29–53 (.354)
- Place: Division: 4th (Pacific); Conference: 13th (Western)
- Playoff finish: Did not qualify
- Stats at Basketball Reference

Local media
- Television: Comcast Sports Net California & KXTV
- Radio: KHTK Sports 1140

The 2014–15 Sacramento Kings season was the platina Jubilee of the franchise, and the 66th season in the National Basketball Association (NBA), and its 30th in Sacramento. The Kings finished 29–53, improving by one win with a defeat of the Los Angeles Lakers on the final day of the regular season.

== Preseason ==
=== Draft picks ===
Round	Pick	Player	Position	Nationality	College
1	8	Nik Stauskas	SG	Canada	Michigan

== Regular season ==
=== Standings ===
Pacific Division	W	L	PCT	GB	Home	Road	Div	GP
z-Golden State Warriors	67	15	.817	–	39‍–‍2	28‍–‍13	13–3	82
x-Los Angeles Clippers	56	26	.683	11.0	30‍–‍11	26‍–‍15	12–4	82
Phoenix Suns	39	43	.476	28.0	22‍–‍19	17‍–‍24	6–10	82
Sacramento Kings	29	53	.354	38.0	18‍–‍23	11‍–‍30	7–9	82
Los Angeles Lakers	21	61	.256	46.0	12‍–‍29	9‍–‍32	2–14	82

Western Conference
#	Team	W	L	PCT	GB	GP
1	z-Golden State Warriors *	67	15	.817	–	82
2	y-Houston Rockets *	56	26	.683	11.0	82
3	x-Los Angeles Clippers	56	26	.683	11.0	82
4	y-Portland Trail Blazers *	51	31	.622	16.0	82
5	x-Memphis Grizzlies	55	27	.671	12.0	82
6	x-San Antonio Spurs	55	27	.671	12.0	82
7	x-Dallas Mavericks	50	32	.610	17.0	82
8	x-New Orleans Pelicans	45	37	.549	22.0	82
9	Oklahoma City Thunder	45	37	.549	22.0	82
10	Phoenix Suns	39	43	.476	28.0	82
11	Utah Jazz	38	44	.463	29.0	82
12	Denver Nuggets	30	52	.366	37.0	82
13	Sacramento Kings	29	53	.354	38.0	82
14	Los Angeles Lakers	21	61	.256	46.0	82
15	Minnesota Timberwolves	16	66	.195	51.0	82

== Game log ==
2014–15 game log
Total: 29–53 (Home: 18–23; Road: 11–30)
October: 1–1 (home: 1–1; road: 0–0)

Game	Date	Team	Score	High points	High rebounds	High assists	Location Attendance	Record
1	October 29	Golden State	L 77–95	DeMarcus Cousins (20)	DeMarcus Cousins (11)	Darren Collison (8)	Sleep Train Arena; 17,317	0–1
2	October 31	Portland	W 103–94	Rudy Gay (40)	DeMarcus Cousins (9)	Darren Collison (8)	Sleep Train Arena; 14,648	1–1

November : 8–7 (home: 3–2; road: 5–5)

Game	Date	Team	Score	High points	High rebounds	High assists	Location Attendance	Record
3	November 2	@ L.A. Clippers	W 98–92	DeMarcus Cousins (34)	DeMarcus Cousins (17)	Rudy Gay (6)	Staples Center; 19,060	2–1
4	November 3	@ Denver	W 110–105	Darren Collison (21)	Reggie Evans (14)	Darren Collison (6)	Pepsi Center; 12,516	3–1
5	November 5	Denver	W 131–109	DeMarcus Cousins (30)	DeMarcus Cousins (11)	Darren Collison (8)	Sleep Train Arena; 14,539	4–1
6	November 7	@ Phoenix	W 114–112 (OT)	DeMarcus Cousins (25)	DeMarcus Cousins (18)	Ramon Sessions (4)	US Airways Center; 15,476	5–1
7	November 9	@ Oklahoma City	L 93–101	Rudy Gay (23)	Rudy Gay (10)	Darren Collison (7)	Chesapeake Energy Arena; 18,203	5–2
8	November 11	@ Dallas	L 98–106	Rudy Gay (26)	DeMarcus Cousins (11)	Rudy Gay (8)	American Airlines Center; 19,663	5–3
9	November 13	@ Memphis	L 110–111	Rudy Gay (25)	DeMarcus Cousins (12)	Darren Collison (5)	FedExForum; 15,666	5–4
10	November 15	San Antonio	W 94–91	DeMarcus Cousins (25)	DeMarcus Cousins (10)	Rudy Gay (6)	Sleep Train Arena; 17,317	6–4
11	November 18	New Orleans	L 100–106	DeMarcus Cousins (24)	DeMarcus Cousins (17)	Darren Collison (11)	Sleep Train Arena; 16,526	6–5
12	November 20	Chicago	W 103–88	DeMarcus Cousins (22)	DeMarcus Cousins (14)	Darren Collison (12)	Sleep Train Arena; 17,317	7–5
13	November 22	@ Minnesota	W 113–101	DeMarcus Cousins (31)	DeMarcus Cousins (18)	Darren Collison (7)	Target Center; 13,191	8–5
14	November 25	@ New Orleans	W 99–89	Casspi & Cousins (22)	DeMarcus Cousins (12)	Ramon Sessions (6)	Smoothie King Center; 17,037	9–5
15	November 26	@ Houston	L 89–102	DeMarcus Cousins (29)	DeMarcus Cousins (17)	DeMarcus Cousins (6)	Toyota Center; 18,058	9–6
16	November 28	@ San Antonio	L 104–112	Rudy Gay (23)	Jason Thompson (9)	Rudy Gay (8)	AT&T Center; 18,581	9–7
17	November 30	Memphis	L 85–97	Rudy Gay (20)	Reggie Evans (20)	Darren Collison (7)	Sleep Train Arena; 16,240	9–8

December : 4–11 (home: 4–7; road: 0–4)

Game	Date	Team	Score	High points	High rebounds	High assists	Location Attendance	Record
18	December 2	Toronto	L 109–117	Ben McLemore (21)	Reggie Evans (7)	Rudy Gay (10)	Sleep Train Arena; 15,522	9–9
19	December 5	Indiana	W 102–101 (OT)	Rudy Gay (27)	Jason Thompson (10)	Darren Collison (6)	Sleep Train Arena; 15,512	10–9
20	December 6	Orlando	L 96–105	Darren Collison (22)	Jason Thompson (9)	Ramon Sessions (7)	Sleep Train Arena; 16,021	10–10
21	December 8	Utah	W 101–92	Rudy Gay (29)	Reggie Evans (13)	Darren Collison (6)	Sleep Train Arena; 16,511	11–10
22	December 9	@ L. A. Lakers	L 95–98	Darren Collison (29)	Reggie Evans (13)	Darren Collison (6)	Staples Center; 18,267	11–11
23	December 11	Houston	L 109–113 (OT)	Darren Collison (24)	Jason Thompson (15)	Rudy Gay (8)	Sleep Train Arena; 16,676	11–12
24	December 13	Detroit	L 90–95	Rudy Gay (20)	Carl Landry (11)	Rudy Gay (8)	Sleep Train Arena; 16,242	11–13
25	December 16	Oklahoma City	L 92–104	Rudy Gay (22)	Thompson & Hollins (9)	Ramon Sessions (4)	Sleep Train Arena; 17,317	11–14
26	December 18	Milwaukee	L 107–108	DeMarcus Cousins (27)	DeMarcus Cousins (11)	Rudy Gay (6)	Sleep Train Arena; 17,317	11–15
27	December 21	L.A. Lakers	W 108–101	DeMarcus Cousins (29)	DeMarcus Cousins (14)	Rudy Gay (6)	Sleep Train Arena; 17,317	12–15
28	December 22	@ Golden State	L 108–128	DeMarcus Cousins (22)	Rudy Gay (9)	Ray McCallum, Jr. (7)	Oracle Arena; 19,596	12–16
29	December 26	Phoenix	L 106–115	Darren Collison (19)	Reggie Evans (16)	Gay & McCallum, Jr. (5)	Sleep Train Arena; 17,317	12–17
30	December 27	New York	W 135–129 (OT)	DeMarcus Cousins (39)	DeMarcus Cousins (11)	Darren Collison (10)	Sleep Train Arena; 17,317	13–17
31	December 29	@ Brooklyn	L 99–107	Rudy Gay (25)	DeMarcus Cousins (13)	Darren Collison (8)	Barclays Center; 17,732	13–18
32	December 31	@ Boston	L 84–106	Rudy Gay (25)	DeMarcus Cousins (13)	Darren Collison (8)	TD Garden; 18,624	13–19

January : 4–9 (home: 2–3; road: 2–6)

Game	Date	Team	Score	High points	High rebounds	High assists	Location Attendance	Record
33	January 1	@ Minnesota	W 110–107	Gay & Collison (21)	Carl Landry (9)	Darren Collison (6)	Target Center; 12,254	14–19
34	January 4	@ Detroit	L 95–114	DeMarcus Cousins (18)	DeMarcus Cousins (15)	Cousins & McLemore (4)	The Palace of Auburn Hills; 13,337	14–20
35	January 7	Oklahoma City	W 104–83	Rudy Gay (28)	DeMarcus Cousins (15)	Darren Collison (7)	Sleep Train Arena; 16,037	15–20
36	January 9	Denver	L 108–118	DeMarcus Cousins (32)	DeMarcus Cousins (13)	Darren Collison (7)	Sleep Train Arena; 16,029	15–21
37	January 11	Cleveland	W 103–84	DeMarcus Cousins (32)	DeMarcus Cousins (13)	Darren Collison (7)	Sleep Train Arena; 16,143	16–21
38	January 13	Dallas	L 104–108 (OT)	DeMarcus Cousins (32)	DeMarcus Cousins (16)	DeMarcus Cousins (9)	Sleep Train Arena; 15,747	16–22
39	January 16	Miami	L 83–95	DeMarcus Cousins (17)	DeMarcus Cousins (11)	Darren Collison (6)	Sleep Train Arena; 16,350	16–23
40	January 17	L.A. Clippers	L 108–117	Jason Thompson (23)	Jason Thompson (22)	Darren Collison (4)	Sleep Train Arena; 16,601	16–24
41	January 19	@ Portland	L 94–98	DeMarcus Cousins (22)	DeMarcus Cousins (19)	Darren Collison (8)	Moda Center; 19,441	16–25
42	January 21	Brooklyn	L 100–103	DeMarcus Cousins (22)	DeMarcus Cousins (19)	Darren Collison (8)	Sleep Train Arena; 16,427	16–26
43	January 23	@ Golden State	L 101–126	DeMarcus Cousins (28)	DeMarcus Cousins (11)	Collison & Gay (8)	Oracle Arena; 19,596	16–27
44	January 28	@ Toronto	L 102–119	Rudy Gay (28)	Carl Landry (7)	DeMarcus Cousins (4)	Air Canada Centre; 19,800	16–28
45	January 30	@ Cleveland	L 90–101	DeMarcus Cousins (21)	DeMarcus Cousins (13)	Cousins & Collison (4)	Quicken Loans Arena; 20,562	16–29
46	January 31	@ Indiana	W 99–94	Rudy Gay (31)	DeMarcus Cousins (19)	Darren Collison (5)	Bankers Life Fieldhouse; 18,165	17–29

February : 3–7 (home: 3–3; road: 0–4)

Game	Date	Team	Score	High points	High rebounds	High assists	Location Attendance	Record
47	February 3	Golden State	L 96–121	DeMarcus Cousins (26)	DeMarcus Cousins (11)	Darren Collison (7)	Sleep Train Arena; 17,317	17–30
48	February 5	Dallas	L 78–101	DeMarcus Cousins (23)	DeMarcus Cousins (11)	Rudy Gay (4)	Sleep Train Arena; 16,993	17–31
49	February 7	@ Utah	L 90–102	DeMarcus Cousins (27)	Reggie Evans (11)	Ramon Sessions (5)	EnergySolutions Arena; 19,128	17–32
50	February 8	Phoenix	W 85–83	DeMarcus Cousins (28)	DeMarcus Cousins (12)	Ramon Sessions (6)	Sleep Train Arena; 17,013	18–32
51	February 10	@ Chicago	L 86–104	Rudy Gay (24)	DeMarcus Cousins (8)	DeMarcus Cousins (8)	United Center; 21,560	18–33
52	February 11	@ Milwaukee	L 103–111	DeMarcus Cousins (28)	DeMarcus Cousins (19)	Ramon Sessions (6)	BMO Harris Bradley Center; 13,046	18–34
All-Star Break
53	February 20	Boston	W 109–101	DeMarcus Cousins (32)	DeMarcus Cousins (15)	Omri Casspi (6)	Sleep Train Arena; 17,317	19–34
54	February 21	@ L.A. Clippers	L 99–126	DeMarcus Cousins (21)	Omri Casspi (17)	Ray McCallum, Jr. (5)	Staples Center; 19,133	19–35
55	February 25	Memphis	W 102–90	Rudy Gay (28)	Thompson & Evans (11)	Andre Miller (7)	Sleep Train Arena; 16,794	20–35
56	February 27	San Antonio	L 96–107	Ben McLemore (21)	Thompson & Evans (11)	Rudy Gay (4)	Sleep Train Arena; 17,317	20–36

March : 6–11 (home: 3–2; road: 3–9)

Game	Date	Team	Score	High points	High rebounds	High assists	Location Attendance	Record
57	March 1	Portland	L 99–110	Rudy Gay (24)	Rudy Gay (8)	Andre Miller (10)	Sleep Train Arena; 16,776	20–37
58	March 3	@ New York	W 124–86	Rudy Gay (25)	DeMarcus Cousins (10)	Gay & McCallum, Jr. & McLemore (4)	Madison Square Garden; 19,812	21–37
59	March 4	@ San Antonio	L 85–112	DeMarcus Cousins (10)	McCallum, Jr. & Thompson (7)	McCallum, Jr. & Miller (4)	AT&T Center; 18,581	21–38
60	March 6	@ Orlando	L 114–119	Rudy Gay (39)	DeMarcus Cousins (12)	Andre Miller (8)	Amway Center; 15,112	21–39
61	March 7	@ Miami	L 109–114 (OT)	Gay & Cousins (27)	DeMarcus Cousins (12)	Andre Miller (8)	AmericanAirlines Arena; 19,600	21–40
62	March 9	@ Atlanta	L 105–130	Rudy Gay (23)	DeMarcus Cousins (14)	DeMarcus Cousins (6)	Philips Arena; 18,418	21–41
63	March 11	@ Charlotte	W 113–106	Ben McLemore (27)	DeMarcus Cousins (14)	Ray McCallum, Jr. (9)	Time Warner Cable Arena; 15,885	22–41
64	March 13	@ Philadelphia	L 107–114	DeMarcus Cousins (39)	DeMarcus Cousins (24)	Ray McCallum, Jr. (9)	Wells Fargo Center; 12,331	22–42
65	March 14	@ Washington	L 97–113	DeMarcus Cousins (30)	Cousins & McCallum, Jr. & Evans (6)	Andre Miller (7)	Verizon Center; 20,356	22–43
66	March 16	Atlanta	L 103–110	DeMarcus Cousins (20)	DeMarcus Cousins (13)	Andre Miller (7)	Sleep Train Arena; 16,835	22–44
67	March 18	L.A. Clippers	L 105–116	Rudy Gay (23)	Reggie Evans (11)	Gay & Miller (4)	Sleep Train Arena; 16,785	22–45
68	March 20	Charlotte	W 101–91	Rudy Gay (33)	Reggie Evans (16)	Andre Miller (7)	Sleep Train Arena; 16,799	23–45
69	March 22	Washington	W 109–86	Rudy Gay (26)	DeMarcus Cousins (7)	McCallum, Jr. (6)	Sleep Train Arena; 17,008	24–45
70	March 24	Philadelphia	W 107–106	DeMarcus Cousins (33)	DeMarcus Cousins (17)	Andre Miller (6)	Sleep Train Arena; 16,636	25–45
71	March 25	@ Phoenix	W 108–99	DeMarcus Cousins (24)	DeMarcus Cousins (11)	Andre Miller (7)	US Airways Center; 17,589	26–45
72	March 27	@ New Orleans	L 88–102	DeMarcus Cousins (39)	DeMarcus Cousins (20)	McCallum, Jr. (5)	Smoothie King Center; 17,669	26–46
73	March 30	@ Memphis	L 83–97	Rudy Gay (24)	Reggie Evans (7)	McCallum, Jr. & Stauskas (3)	FedExForum; 17,218	26–47

April : 3–6 (home: 2–2; road: 1–4)

Game	Date	Team	Score	High points	High rebounds	High assists	Location Attendance	Record
74	April 1	@ Houston	L 111–115	DeMarcus Cousins (24)	DeMarcus Cousins (21)	DeMarcus Cousins (10)	Toyota Center; 18,312	26–48
75	April 3	New Orleans	L 95–101	DeMarcus Cousins (24)	DeMarcus Cousins (20)	DeMarcus Cousins (13)	Sleep Train Arena; 17,021	26–49
76	April 5	Utah	L 95–101	DeMarcus Cousins (26)	DeMarcus Cousins (12)	Ray McCallum, Jr. (7)	Sleep Train Arena; 16,716	26–50
77	April 7	Minnesota	W 116–111	Rudy Gay (32)	Ray McCallum, Jr. (9)	Andre Miller (8)	Sleep Train Arena; 16,770	27–50
78	April 8	@ Utah	L 91–103	Casspi & Landry & McLemore (16)	Jason Thompson (11)	Omri Casspi (5)	EnergySolutions Arena; 18,351	27–51
79	April 10	@ Oklahoma City	L 103–116	Ben McLemore (20)	Jason Thompson (14)	Andre Miller (8)	Chesapeake Energy Arena; 18,203	27–52
80	April 12	@ Denver	L 111–122	Omri Casspi (22)	Omri Casspi (7)	Casspi & McLemore (7)	Pepsi Center; 14,004	27–53
81	April 13	L.A. Lakers	W 102–92	Omri Casspi (26)	Jason Thompson (10)	Casspi & Miller (6)	Sleep Train Arena; 17,317	28–53
82	April 15	@ L.A. Lakers	W 122–99	Ben McLemore (24)	Carl Landry (9)	McLemore & Stockton (7)	Staples Center; 18,997	29–53

2014–15 season schedule

== Player statistics ==
Legend
GP	Games played	GS	Games started	MPG	Minutes per game
FG%	Field-goal percentage	3P%	3-point field-goal percentage	FT%	Free-throw percentage
RPG	Rebounds per game	APG	Assists per game	SPG	Steals per game
BPG	Blocks per game	PPG	Points per game

=== Regular season ===
Player	GP	GS	MPG	FG%	3P%	FT%	RPG	APG	SPG	BPG	PPG
Ben McLemore	82	82	32.6	.437	.358	.813	2.9	1.7	.9	.2	12.1
Jason Thompson	81	63	24.6	.470	.000	.622	6.5	1.0	.4	.7	6.1
Derrick Williams	74	6	19.8	.447	.314	.684	2.7	.7	.5	.1	8.3
Nik Stauskas	73	1	15.4	.365	.322	.859	1.2	.9	.3	.2	4.4
Carl Landry	70	15	17.0	.515		.820	3.8	.4	.2	.2	7.2
Rudy Gay	68	67	35.4	.455	.359	.858	5.9	3.7	1.0	.6	21.1
Ray McCallum Jr.	68	30	21.1	.438	.306	.679	2.6	2.8	.7	.2	7.4
Omri Casspi	67	19	21.1	.489	.402	.733	3.9	1.5	.5	.1	8.9
DeMarcus Cousins	59	59	34.1	.467	.250	.782	12.7	3.6	1.5	1.7	24.1
Reggie Evans	47	7	16.3	.423	.000	.619	6.4	.7	.5	.1	3.7
Ryan Hollins	46	9	9.6	.646		.574	2.2	.3	.1	.4	3.0
Darren Collison	45	45	34.8	.473	.373	.788	3.2	5.6	1.5	.3	16.1
Ramon Sessions^{†}	36	7	17.8	.344	.214	.727	1.9	2.7	.4	.0	5.4
Andre Miller^{†}	30	0	20.7	.459	.231	.789	2.5	4.7	.6	.1	5.7
Quincy Miller^{†}	6	0	10.2	.222	.143	.727	2.0	.5	1.0	.5	2.8
David Stockton	3	0	11.0	.333	.500	.500	.7	3.0	.7	.0	2.7
Sim Bhullar	3	0	1.0	.500			.3	.3	.0	.3	.7
Eric Moreland	3	0	0.7	1.000			.3	.0	.0	.0	.7
David Wear	2	0	3.5	.000	.000		1.0	.5	.0	.0	.0

- ^{†} Denotes player spent time with another team in the season. Stats reflect time with the Kings only.

== Roster ==
2014–15 Sacramento Kings roster
Players

Pos.	No.	Player	Height	Weight	DOB	From
SF	18	Omri Casspi	6 ft 9 in (2.06 m)	225 lb (102 kg)	1988-06-22	Israel
PG	7	Darren Collison	6 ft 0 in (1.83 m)	175 lb (79 kg)	1987-08-23	UCLA
C	15	DeMarcus Cousins	6 ft 11 in (2.11 m)	270 lb (122 kg)	1990-08-13	Kentucky
PF	30	Reggie Evans	6 ft 8 in (2.03 m)	245 lb (111 kg)	1980-05-18	Iowa
SF	8	Rudy Gay	6 ft 8 in (2.03 m)	230 lb (104 kg)	1986-08-17	Connecticut
C	5	Ryan Hollins	7 ft 0 in (2.13 m)	240 lb (109 kg)	1984-10-10	UCLA
PF	24	Carl Landry	6 ft 9 in (2.06 m)	248 lb (112 kg)	1983-09-19	Purdue
PG	3	Ray McCallum	6 ft 3 in (1.91 m)	190 lb (86 kg)	1991-06-12	Detroit Mercy
SG	23	Ben McLemore	6 ft 5 in (1.96 m)	195 lb (88 kg)	1993-02-11	Kansas
PG	22	Andre Miller	6 ft 2 in (1.88 m)	200 lb (91 kg)	1976-03-19	Utah
PF	25	Eric Moreland	6 ft 10 in (2.08 m)	218 lb (99 kg)	1991-12-24	Oregon State
SG	10	Nik Stauskas	6 ft 6 in (1.98 m)	207 lb (94 kg)	1993-10-07	Michigan
PG	9	David Stockton	5 ft 11 in (1.80 m)	165 lb (75 kg)	1991-06-24	Gonzaga
PF	34	Jason Thompson	6 ft 11 in (2.11 m)	250 lb (113 kg)	1986-07-21	Rider
PF	13	Derrick Williams	6 ft 8 in (2.03 m)	240 lb (109 kg)	1991-05-25	Arizona

Coaches
Head coach
- Michael Malone (fired)
- Tyrone Corbin (interim)
- George Karl
Assistant(s)
- Dee Brown (player development)
- Chris Jent
- Corliss Williamson
- Micah Nori
- Ryan Bowen

Legend
- (DP) Unsigned draft pick
- (FA) Free agent
- (S) Suspended
- (GL) On assignment to G League affiliate
- Injured

Roster
Updated: April 12, 2015

== Transactions ==
=== Free agents ===
==== Re-signed ====
Player	Signed	Contract	Ref.

==== Additions ====
Player	Signed	Former team	Ref.

==== Subtractions ====
Player	Reason left	Date	New team	Ref.

== Awards ==
Player	Award	Date awarded	Ref.
