= 2014–15 Charlotte Hornets season =

NBA professional basketball team season

- Head coach: Steve Clifford
- Owners: Michael Jordan
- Arena: Time Warner Cable Arena

Results
- Record: 33–49 (.402)
- Place: Division: 4th (Southeast); Conference: 11th (Eastern)
- Playoff finish: Did not qualify
- Stats at Basketball Reference

Local media
- Television: Fox Sports Carolinas, SportSouth
- Radio: WFNZ

The 2014–15 Charlotte Hornets season was the franchise's 25th season in the National Basketball Association (NBA) and their eleventh since their return in 2003–04. On May 20, 2014, the team formally changed its name to "Charlotte Hornets", and acquired the history and records of the original Charlotte Hornets franchise (1988–2002) from the New Orleans Pelicans. The team was led by head coach Steve Clifford and assistant coaches Patrick Ewing, Pat Delany, Stephen Silas, Bob Weiss, and Mark Price.

== Preseason ==
=== Key dates ===
- June 26: The 2014 NBA draft took place at the Barclays Center in Brooklyn, New York.
- July 1: 2014 NBA Free Agency begins.

=== Draft picks ===
Round	Pick	Player	Position	Nationality	College/Club Team
1	9	Noah Vonleh	PF	United States	Indiana
1	24	Shabazz Napier	PG	United States	Connecticut
2	45	Dwight Powell	PF	Canada	Stanford

The team entered the draft for the first time as Charlotte Hornets since 2001 with two first-round selections, both conveyed through previous trades with the Detroit Pistons and Portland Trail Blazers as these fell outside their respective lottery protections, and one original second-round selection. Their original first-round selection was finally conveyed to the Chicago Bulls via the 2010 Tyrus Thomas trade, falling outside its top-10 protection when Charlotte made the 2014 NBA playoffs as the Bobcats after having been deferred in 2012 and 2013 due to poor regular-season finishes.

== Regular season ==
=== Standings ===
Southeast Division	W	L	PCT	GB	Home	Road	Div	GP
c-Atlanta Hawks	60	22	.732	–	35‍–‍6	25‍–‍16	12–4	82
x-Washington Wizards	46	36	.561	14.0	29‍–‍12	17‍–‍24	10–6	82
Miami Heat	37	45	.451	23.0	20‍–‍21	17‍–‍24	6–10	82
Charlotte Hornets	33	49	.402	27.0	19‍–‍22	14‍–‍27	8–8	82
Orlando Magic	25	57	.305	35.0	13‍–‍28	12‍–‍29	4–12	82

Eastern Conference
#	Team	W	L	PCT	GB	GP
1	c-Atlanta Hawks *	60	22	.732	–	82
2	y-Cleveland Cavaliers *	53	29	.646	7.0	82
3	x-Chicago Bulls	50	32	.610	10.0	82
4	y-Toronto Raptors *	49	33	.598	11.0	82
5	x-Washington Wizards	46	36	.561	14.0	82
6	x-Milwaukee Bucks	41	41	.500	19.0	82
7	x-Boston Celtics	40	42	.488	20.0	82
8	x-Brooklyn Nets	38	44	.463	22.0	82
9	Indiana Pacers	38	44	.463	22.0	82
10	Miami Heat	37	45	.451	23.0	82
11	Charlotte Hornets	33	49	.402	27.0	82
12	Detroit Pistons	32	50	.390	28.0	82
13	Orlando Magic	25	57	.305	35.0	82
14	Philadelphia 76ers	18	64	.220	42.0	82
15	New York Knicks	17	65	.207	43.0	82

== Game log ==
=== Preseason ===
The pre-season schedule was released on July 31.

2014 pre-season game log
Pre-season: 3–5 (home: 2–2; road: 1–3)

Game	Date	Team	Score	High points	High rebounds	High assists	Location Attendance	Record
1	October 8	@ Philadelphia	L 92–106	Gary Neal (14)	Jefferson & Marvin Williams (8)	Kemba Walker (3)	Wells Fargo Center	0–1
2	October 10	@ Washington	W 99–86	Gary Neal (19)	Al Jefferson (10)	Kemba Walker (6)	Bon Secours Wellness Arena	1–1
3	October 13	Orlando	W 99–97	Al Jefferson (20)	3 Tied (7)	Brian Roberts (6)	Time Warner Cable Arena	2–1
4	October 15	Detroit	L 84–104	Gary Neal (20)	Jefferson & Kidd-Gilchrist (7)	Stephenson & Pargo (3)	Time Warner Cable Arena	2–2
5	October 17	Washington	W 96–86	Al Jefferson (20)	Michael Kidd-Gilchrist (11)	Marvin Williams (5)	Verizon Center	3–2
6	October 19	@ Chicago	L 96–101	Stephenson & Kidd-Gilchrist (14)	Marvin Williams (9)	Kemba Walker (7)	United Center	3–3
7	October 20	@ Atlanta	L 114–117	Gary Neal (21)	Bismack Biyombo (10)	Kemba Walker (8)	Philips Arena	3–4
8	October 23	Indiana	L 79–88	Brian Roberts (19)	Jefferson & Kidd-Gilchrist (7)	Gary Neal (6)	Time Warner Cable Arena	3–5

2014–15 season schedule

=== Regular season ===
The schedule was announced on August 13.

2014–15 game log
Total: 33–49 (Home: 19–22; Road: 14–27)
October: 1–0 (home: 1–0; road: 0–0)

Game	Date	Team	Score	High points	High rebounds	High assists	Location Attendance	Record
1	October 29	Milwaukee	W 108–106 (OT)	Kemba Walker (26)	Lance Stephenson (13)	Lance Stephenson (8)	Time Warner Cable Arena; 19,439	1–0

November : 3–14 (home: 2–6; road: 1–8)

Game	Date	Team	Score	High points	High rebounds	High assists	Location Attendance	Record
2	November 1	Memphis	L 69–71	Al Jefferson (19)	Michael Kidd-Gilchrist (12)	Stephenson & Walker (4)	Time Warner Cable Arena; 18,133	1–1
3	November 2	@ New York	L 93–96	Al Jefferson (21)	Lance Stephenson (9)	Lance Stephenson (8)	Madison Square Garden; 19,812	1–2
4	November 4	@ New Orleans	L 91–100	Gary Neal (21)	Lance Stephenson (7)	Brian Roberts (6)	Smoothie King Center; 14,840	1–3
5	November 5	Miami	W 96–89	Al Jefferson (28)	Lance Stephenson (13)	Kemba Walker (7)	Time Warner Cable Arena; 15,874	2–3
6	November 7	Atlanta	W 122–119 (2OT)	Al Jefferson (34)	Lance Stephenson (13)	Kemba Walker (10)	Time Warner Cable Arena; 15,891	3–3
7	November 9	@ L.A. Lakers	L 92–107	Al Jefferson (23)	Lance Stephenson (10)	Lance Stephenson (5)	Staples Center; 18,997	3–4
8	November 11	@ Portland	L 100–102	Al Jefferson (22)	Lance Stephenson (14)	Neal, Stephenson, Walker, Marvin Williams(3)	Moda Center; 18,495	3–5
9	November 14	@ Phoenix	W 103–95	Kemba Walker (19)	Bismack Biyombo (10)	Lance Stephenson (7)	Talking Stick Resort Arena; 16,291	4–5
10	November 15	@ Golden State	L 87–112	Al Jefferson (19)	Cody Zeller (10)	Kemba Walker (5)	Oracle Arena; 19,596	4–6
11	November 17	Dallas	L 80–107	Gerald Henderson (18)	Bismack Biyombo (8)	Lance Stephenson (7)	Time Warner Cable Arena; 15,345	4–7
12	November 19	@ Indiana	L 86–88	Al Jefferson (28)	Stephenson & Jefferson (8)	Stephenson & Walker (7)	Bankers Life Fieldhouse; 14,748	4–8
13	November 21	Orlando	L 100–105	Al Jefferson (24)	Kemba Walker (12)	Kemba Walker (8)	Time Warner Cable Arena; 18,126	4–9
14	November 23	@ Miami	L 93–94	Al Jefferson (22)	Al Jefferson (12)	Lance Stephenson (5)	AmericanAirlines Arena; 19,639	4–10
15	November 24	L.A. Clippers	L 92–113	Cody Zeller (17)	Jefferson & Biyombo (9)	Stephensno & Walker (6)	Time Warner Cable Arena; 17,180	4–11
16	November 26	Portland	L 97–105	Al Jefferson (23)	Al Jefferson (14)	Kemba Walker (9)	Time Warner Cable Arena; 16,972	4–12
17	November 28	Golden State	L 101–106	Brian Roberts (20)	Cody Zeller (14)	Kemba Walker (13)	Time Warner Cable Arena; 19,381	4–13
18	November 29	@ Atlanta	L 75–105	P.J. Hairston (15)	Bismack Biyombo (11)	Kemba Walker (6)	Philips Arena; 14,185	4–14

December : 6–9 (home: 4–5; road: 2–4)

Game	Date	Team	Score	High points	High rebounds	High assists	Location Attendance	Record
19	December 3	Chicago	L 95–102	Kemba Walker (23)	Stephenson & Zeller (7)	Stephenson & Walker (4)	Time Warner Cable Arena; 16,887	4–15
20	December 5	New York	W 103–102	Gerald Henderson (22)	Al Jefferson (13)	Lance Stephenson (6)	Time Warner Cable Arena; 19,102	5–15
21	December 10	Boston	W 96–87	Al Jefferson (23)	Al Jefferson (14)	Kemba Walker (7)	Time Warner Cable Arena; 15,276	6–15
22	December 12	@ Memphis	L 107–113 (OT)	Kemba Walker (28)	Al Jefferson (9)	Kemba Walker (7)	FedExForum; 15,897	6–16
23	December 13	Brooklyn	L 87–114	Michael Kidd-Gilchrist (15)	Bismack Biyombo (10)	Kemba Walker (4)	Time Warner Cable Arena; 17,113	6–17
24	December 15	@ Cleveland	L 88–97	Kemba Walker (24)	Al Jefferson (8)	Gary Neal (6)	Quicken Loans Arena; 20,562	6–18
25	December 17	Phoenix	L 106–111	Al Jefferson (28)	Al Jefferson (10)	Kemba Walker (7)	Time Warner Cable Arena; 15,459	6–19
26	December 19	@ Philadelphia	W 109–91	Kemba Walker (30)	Al Jefferson (12)	Gary Neal (6)	Wells Fargo Center; 13,398	7–19
27	December 20	Utah	W 104–86	Kemba Walker (20)	Michael Kidd-Gilchrist (11)	Kemba Walker (6)	Time Warner Cable Arena; 17,384	8–19
28	December 22	Denver	W 110–82	Al Jefferson (22)	P.J. Hairston (10)	Kemba Walker (9)	Time Warner Cable Arena; 17,384	9–19
29	December 23	@ Milwaukee	W 108–101	Kemba Walker (21)	Al Jefferson (9)	Henderson, Roberts, Walker (4)	BMO Harris Bradley Center; 14,653	10–19
30	December 26	@ Oklahoma City	L 75–98	Brian Roberts (17)	Biyombo, Henderson, Jefferon (7)	Gerald Hendeson (5)	Chesapeake Energy Arena; 18,203	10–20
31	December 27	Orlando	L 94–102	Kemba Walker (42)	Al Jefferson (9)	Kemba Walker (7)	Time Warner Cable Arena; 19,085	10–21
32	December 29	Milwaukee	L 94–104 (OT)	Kemba Walker (28)	Marvin Williams (14)	Jefferson & Henderson (5)	Time Warner Cable Arena; 17,430	10–22
33	December 31	@ Houston	L 83–102	Kidd-Gilchrist & Henderson (16)	Michael Kidd-Gilchrist (8)	Kemba Walker (5)	Toyota Center; 18,276	10–23

January : 10–4 (home: 5–2; road: 5–2)

Game	Date	Team	Score	High points	High rebounds	High assists	Location Attendance	Record
34	January 2	Cleveland	L 87–91	Gerald Henderson (14)	Henderson (8)	Kemba Walker (5)	Time Warner Cable Arena; 19,307	10–24
35	January 3	@ Orlando	W 98–90	Kemba Walker (30)	Michael Kidd-Gilchrist (12)	Kemba Walker (6)	Amway Center; 15,274	11–24
36	January 5	@ Boston	W 104–95	Kemba Walker (33)	Bismack Biyombo (10)	Gerald Henderson (8)	TD Garden; 16,720	12–24
37	January 7	New Orleans	W 98–94	Kemba Walker (31)	Michael Kidd-Gilchrist (12)	Gerald Henderson (6)	Time Warner Cable Arena; 15,171	13–24
38	January 8	@ Toronto	W 103–95	Gerald Henderson (31)	Michael Kidd-Gilchrist (12)	Kemba Walker (8)	Air Canada Centre; 19,800	14–24
39	January 10	@ New York	W 110–82	Kemba Walker (28)	Bismack Biyombo (10)	Brian Roberts (5)	Madison Square Garden; 19,812	15–24
40	January 14	San Antonio	L 93–98	Kemba Walker (28)	Bismack Biyombo (15)	Cody Zeller (4)	Time Warner Cable Arena; 17,309	15–25
41	January 17	Indiana	W 80–71 (OT)	Gerald Henderson (20)	Michael Kidd-Gilchrist (16)	Henderson & Roberts(4)	Time Warner Cable Arena; 19,285	16–25
42	January 19	Minnesota	W 105–80	Gerald Henderson (17)	Marvin Williams (11)	Lance Stephenson (9)	Time Warner Cable Arena; 17,989	17–25
43	January 21	Miami	W 78–76	Kemba Walker (15)	Michael Kidd-Gilchrist (14)	Cody Zeller (6)	Time Warner Cable Arena; 16,914	18–25
44	January 23	@ Cleveland	L 90–129	Al Jefferson (22)	Al Jefferson (11)	Lance Stephenson (9)	Quicken Loans Arena; 20,562	18–26
45	January 24	New York	W 76–71	Brian Roberts (17)	Cody Zeller (8)	Lance Stephenson (4)	Time Warner Cable Arena; 19,117	19–26
46	January 28	@ San Antonio	L 86–95	Gerald Henderson (18)	Al Jefferson (16)	Cody Zeller (7)	AT&T Center; 18,581	19–27
47	January 31	@ Denver	W 104–86	Cody Zeller (21)	Michael Kidd-Gilchrist (13)	Lance Stephenson (13)	Pepsi Center; 13,302	20–27

February : 3–6 (home: 1–3; road: 2–3)

Game	Date	Team	Score	High points	High rebounds	High assists	Location Attendance	Record
48	February 2	@ Washington	W 92–85	Jefferson & Roberts (18)	Michael Kidd-Gilchrist (13)	Gerald Henderson (18)	Verizon Center; 15,816	21–27
49	February 5	Washington	W 94–87	Gerald Henderson (27)	Al Jefferson (10)	Brian Roberts (5)	Time Warner Cable Arena; 17,019	22–27
50	February 7	@ Philadelphia	L 81–89	Al Jefferson (18)	Al Jefferson (9)	Gerald Henderson (9)	Wells Fargo Center; 16,739	22–28
51	February 8	Indiana	L 102–103	Al Jefferson (30)	Al Jefferson (13)	Gerald Henderson (8)	Time Warner Cable Arena; 16,991	22–29
52	February 10	Detroit	L 78–106	Gerald Henderson (17)	Al Jefferson (10)	Henderson & Roberts (5)	Time Warner Cable Arena; 15,876	22–30
All-Star Break
53	February 21	Oklahoma City	L 103–110	Mo Williams (24)	Al Jefferson (12)	Mo Williams (12)	Time Warner Cable Arena; 19,303	22–31
54	February 22	@ Dallas	L 81–92	Mo Williams (22)	Al Jefferson (17)	Lance Stephenson (5)	American Airlines Center; 20,347	22–32
55	February 25	@ Chicago	W 98–86	Michael Kidd-Gilchrist (18)	Michael Kidd-Gilchrist (12)	Mo Williams (5)	United Center; 21,509	23–32
56	February 27	@ Boston	L 98–106	Mo Williams (31)	Michael Kidd-Gilchrist (11)	Lance Stephenson (7)	TD Garden; 18,624	23–33

March : 8–9 (home: 4–4; road: 4–5)

Game	Date	Team	Score	High points	High rebounds	High assists	Location Attendance	Record
57	March 1	@ Orlando	W 98–83	Mo Williams (23)	Michael Kidd-Gilchrist (13)	Mo Williams (11)	Amway Center; 15,422	24–33
58	March 3	L.A. Lakers	W 104–103	Henderson & Jefferson (21)	Al Jefferson (16)	Mo Williams (13)	Time Warner Cable Arena; 16,947	25–33
59	March 4	@ Brooklyn	W 115–91	Henderson & Jefferson (19)	Al Jefferson (13)	Mo Williams (14)	Barclays Center; 16,691	26–33
60	March 6	Toronto	W 103–94	Jefferson & Mo Williams (23)	Al Jefferson (13)	Mo Williams (7)	Time Warner Cable Arena; 19,080	27–33
61	March 8	@ Detroit	W 108–101	Al Jefferson (24)	Al Jefferson (8)	Henderson & Mo Williams (9)	The Palace of Auburn Hills; 15,673	28–33
62	March 9	Washington	L 69–95	Mo Williams (19)	Bismack Biyombo (9)	Mo Williams (7)	Time Warner Cable Arena; 15,119	28–34
63	March 11	Sacramento	L 106–113	Michael Kidd-Gilchrist (23)	Michael Kidd-Gilchrist (9)	Gerald Henderson (11)	Time Warner Cable Arena; 15,885	28–35
64	March 13	Chicago	W 101–91	Gerald Henderson (20)	Bismack Biyombo (10)	Kemba Walker (7)	Time Warner Cable Arena; 19,183	29–35
65	March 16	@ Utah	L 66–94	Lance Stephenson (17)	Al Jefferson (7)	Walker & Mo Williams (3)	EnergySolutions Arena; 16,743	29–36
66	March 17	@ L.A. Clippers	L 92–99	Al Jefferson (21)	Marvin Williams (11)	Mo Williams (8)	Staples Center; 19,060	29–37
67	March 20	@ Sacramento	L 91–101	Gerald Henderson (20)	Henderson & Jefferson & Walker (5)	Walker & Cody Zeller (4)	Sleep Train Arena; 16,799	29–38
68	March 22	@ Minnesota	W 107–98	Mo Williams (24)	Al Jefferson (11)	Kemba Walker (8)	Target Center; 15,262	30–38
69	March 23	@ Chicago	L 86–98	Kemba Walker (29)	Gilchrist & Henderson (9)	Mo Williams (5)	United Center; 21,646	30–39
70	March 25	Brooklyn	L 88–91	Henderson & Jefferson (23)	Gilchrist & Jefferson (10)	Walker & Mo Williams (6)	Time Warner Cable Arena; 15,091	30–40
71	March 27	@ Washington	L 107–110 (2OT)	Al Jefferson (31)	Gerald Henderson (14)	Walker & Mo Williams (10)	Verizon Center; 18,441	30–41
72	March 28	Atlanta	W 115–100	Kemba Walker (29)	Bismack Biyombo (11)	Kemba Walker (6)	Time Warner Cable Arena; 19,122	31–41
73	March 30	Boston	L 104–116	Kemba Walker (28)	Jason Maxiell (8)	Kemba Walker (120	Time Warner Cable Arena; 15,140	31–42

April : 2–7 (home: 2–2; road: 0–5)

Game	Date	Team	Score	High points	High rebounds	High assists	Location Attendance	Record
74	April 1	Detroit	W 102–78	Marvin Williams (18)	Al Jefferson (9)	Mo Williams (6)	Time Warner Cable Arena; 15,372	32–42
75	April 3	@ Indiana	L 74–93	Gerald Henderson (12)	Bismack Biyombo (9)	Marvin Williams (4)	Bankers Life Fieldhouse; 18,165	32–43
76	April 4	Philadelphia	W 92–91	Kemba Walker (24)	Bismack Biyombo (9)	Mo Williams (5)	Time Warner Cable Arena; 17,286	33–43
77	April 7	@ Miami	L 100–105	Gerald Henderson (29)	Marvin Williams (13)	Walker & Mo Williams (4)	American Airlines Arena; 19,694	33–44
78	April 8	Toronto	L 74–92	Kemba Walker (15)	Bismack Biyombo (7)	Henderson, Roberts, Walker & Mo Williams (3)	Time Warner Cable Arena	33–45
79	April 10	@ Atlanta	L 80–104	Troy Daniels (15)	Bismack Biyombo (11)	Kemba Walker (6)	Philips Arena; 18,462	33–46
80	April 12	@ Detroit	L 77–116	Noah Vonleh (16)	Noah Vonleh (12)	Kemba Walker (7)	The Palace of Auburn Hills; 17,297	33–47
81	April 13	Houston	L 90–100	Brian Roberts (23)	Bismack Biyombo (13)	Henderson, Walker (5)	Time Warner Cable Arena; 15,797	33–48
82	April 15	@ Toronto	L 87–92	Troy Daniels (24)	Noah Vonleh (12)	Brian Roberts (5)	Air Canada Centre; 19,800	33–49

2014–15 season schedule

== Player statistics ==
Statistics (Summer League, preseason, and regular season)

Legend
GP	Games played	GS	Games started	MPG	Minutes per game
FG%	Field-goal percentage	3P%	3-point field-goal percentage	FT%	Free-throw percentage
RPG	Rebounds per game	APG	Assists per game	SPG	Steals per game
BPG	Blocks per game	PPG	Points per game

=== Summer League ===
Charlotte Hornets statistics
Player	GP	GS	MPG	FG%	3P%	FT%	RPG	APG	SPG	BPG	PPG
Justin Burrell	5	0	11.2	.400	.500	.500	3.0	0.8	0.2	0.0	2.2
Justin Cobbs	3	0	13.3	.143	.000	1.000	0.3	2.0	0.3	0.0	1.3
Troy Daniels	4	4	30.8	.439	.545	.750	7.8	2.5	0.5	0.0	13.5
P.J. Hairston	5	5	29.2	.333	.294	.813	5.2	2.0	1.0	0.0	12.2
Aaron Harrison	5	4	29.0	.421	.238	.667	4.8	3.4	1.4	0.6	13.4
Frank Kaminsky	5	5	32.6	.438	.389	.765	7.8	0.8	1.0	0.6	15.2
Kevin Murphy	5	1	20.6	.455	.333	.818	2.8	1.4	0.8	0.2	6.2
Brian Qvale	5	5	21.6	.583	.000	.500	5.2	1.4	1.0	1.6	6.0
Keith Rendleman	3	0	5.3	1.000	.000	.000	0.7	0.0	0.3	0.3	1.3
Ralston Turner	2	0	7.5	.000	.000	.000	1.0	0.0	1.0	0.5	0.0
Jonathan Wallace	4	1	15.2	.364	.429	.000	1.0	2.0	0.2	0.2	5.5

=== Preseason ===
Charlotte Hornets statistics
Player	GP	GS	MPG	FG%	3P%	FT%	RPG	APG	SPG	BPG	PPG
Bismack Biyombo	7	1	17.3	.326	.000	.625	5.4	0.4	0.1	1.0	3.6
Justin Cobbs	0	0	0.0	.000	.000	.000	0.0	0.0	0.0	0.0	0.0
P.J. Hairston	8	0	19.1	.391	.421	.846	2.6	0.9	0.8	0.4	9.6
Gerald Henderson	8	8	27.4	.371	.167	.759	1.4	1.6	0.9	0.0	11.3
Al Jefferson	7	7	28.9	.396	.000	.824	7.4	1.6	0.7	1.6	14.0
Michael Kidd-Gilchrist	8	8	29.4	.429	.000	.722	6.8	2.0	1.4	1.0	10.8
Dallas Lauderdale	0	0	0.0	.000	.000	.000	0.0	0.0	0.0	0.0	0.0
Jason Maxiell	5	0	14.2	.429	.000	.667	3.0	0.0	0.0	1.0	4.0
Gary Neal	8	0	26.3	.402	.222	.933	3.9	3.5	0.3	0.1	12.5
Jannero Pargo	6	0	15.2	.426	.375	.600	1.8	2.8	0.3	0.0	9.7
Brian Roberts	8	0	23.8	.397	.250	1.000	1.1	2.9	0.5	0.0	9.0
Lance Stephenson	4	4	30.0	.425	.286	.700	3.3	2.8	0.5	0.0	10.8
Noah Vonleh	1	0	19.0	.400	.000	.000	4.0	0.0	2.0	0.0	4.0
Kemba Walker	6	6	26.7	.438	.318	.944	4.2	5.5	0.7	0.5	13.3
Marvin Williams	7	7	26.7	.341	.269	.333	5.9	2.1	1.7	0.3	5.6
Cody Zeller	8	1	21.6	.477	.000	.867	4.5	2.1	0.3	0.4	6.9

=== Regular season ===
Charlotte Hornets statistics
Player	GP	GS	MPG	FG%	3P%	FT%	RPG	APG	SPG	BPG	PPG
Bismack Biyombo	64	21	19.4	.543	.000	.580	6.4	0.3	0.3	1.5	4.8
Troy Daniels	11	0	12.3	.458	.472	.860	0.7	0.5	0.3	0.1	7.0
P.J. Hairston	45	2	15.3	.323	.301	.860	2.0	0.5	0.5	0.3	5.6
Gerald Henderson	80	72	28.9	.437	.331	.850	3.4	2.6	0.6	0.3	12.1
Al Jefferson	65	61	30.6	.481	.400	.650	8.4	1.7	0.7	1.3	16.6
Michael Kidd-Gilchrist	55	51	28.9	.465	.000	.700	7.6	1.4	0.5	0.7	10.9
Jason Maxiell	61	0	14.4	.422	.000	.580	3.3	0.3	0.3	0.7	3.3
Gary Neal	43	0	21.7	.359	.293	0.860	2.2	1.9	0.4	0.0	9.6
Jannero Pargo	9	0	8.1	.429	.409	1.000	0.3	0.9	0.0	0.0	4.6
Brian Roberts	72	10	18.5	.389	.321	.890	1.5	2.3	0.5	0.1	6.7
Lance Stephenson	61	25	25.8	.376	.171	.630	4.5	3.9	0.6	0.1	8.2
Jeff Taylor	29	13	14.8	.395	.306	.630	1.8	0.8	0.4	0.0	4.4
Noah Vonleh	25	0	10.4	.395	.385	.690	3.4	0.2	0.2	0.4	3.3
Kemba Walker	62	58	34.2	.385	.304	.830	3.5	5.1	1.4	0.6	17.3
Marvin Williams	78	37	26.1	.424	.358	.710	4.9	1.3	0.9	0.5	7.4
Mo Williams	27	14	30.8	.390	.337	.890	2.8	6.0	0.6	0.2	17.2
Cody Zeller	62	45	24.0	.461	1.000	.770	5.8	1.6	0.6	0.8	7.6

== Injuries ==
Player	Duration		Injury type	Games missed
Player	Start	End	Injury type	Games missed

== Roster ==
2014–15 Charlotte Hornets roster
Players

Pos.	No.	Player	Height	Weight	DOB	From
C	8	Bismack Biyombo	6 ft 9 in (2.06 m)	245 lb (111 kg)	1992–08–28	DR Congo
SG	30	Troy Daniels	6 ft 4 in (1.93 m)	205 lb (93 kg)	1991–07–15	VCU
SG	19	P. J. Hairston	6 ft 6 in (1.98 m)	230 lb (104 kg)	1992–12–24	North Carolina
SG	9	Gerald Henderson	6 ft 5 in (1.96 m)	215 lb (98 kg)	1987–12–09	Duke
C	25	Al Jefferson	6 ft 10 in (2.08 m)	289 lb (131 kg)	1985–01–04	Prentiss HS (MS)
SF	14	Michael Kidd-Gilchrist	6 ft 7 in (2.01 m)	232 lb (105 kg)	1993–09–26	Kentucky
PF	54	Jason Maxiell	6 ft 7 in (2.01 m)	260 lb (118 kg)	1983–02–18	Cincinnati
PG	22	Brian Roberts	6 ft 1 in (1.85 m)	173 lb (78 kg)	1985–12–03	Dayton
SG	1	Lance Stephenson	6 ft 5 in (1.96 m)	230 lb (104 kg)	1990–09–05	Cincinnati
SF	44	Jeffery Taylor	6 ft 7 in (2.01 m)	225 lb (102 kg)	1989–05–23	Vanderbilt
PF	11	Noah Vonleh	6 ft 10 in (2.08 m)	247 lb (112 kg)	1995–08–24	Indiana
PG	15	Kemba Walker	6 ft 1 in (1.85 m)	184 lb (83 kg)	1990–05–08	Connecticut
PF	2	Marvin Williams	6 ft 9 in (2.06 m)	237 lb (108 kg)	1986–06–19	North Carolina
PG	7	Mo Williams	6 ft 1 in (1.85 m)	198 lb (90 kg)	1982–12–19	Alabama
PF	40	Cody Zeller	7 ft 0 in (2.13 m)	240 lb (109 kg)	1992–10–05	Indiana

Coaches
Head coach
- Steve Clifford
Assistant(s)
- Pat Delany
- Mark Price
- Stephen Silas
- Bob Weiss
- Patrick Ewing (associate head coach)

Legend
- (DP) Unsigned draft pick
- (FA) Free agent
- (S) Suspended
- (DL) On assignment to D-League affiliate
- Injured

Roster
Updated: 2015–02–10

== Transactions ==
=== Trades ===
June 26 (Draft-day trade)	To Charlotte Hornets: Draft rights to 26th pick P. J. Hairston; Draft rights to 55th pick Semaj Christon; 2019 second-round pick; Cash considerations	To Miami Heat: Draft rights to 24th pick Shabazz Napier
June 26 (Draft-day trade)	To Charlotte Hornets: Cash considerations	To Oklahoma City Thunder: Draft rights to 55th pick Semaj Christon
July 12	To Charlotte Hornets: Scotty Hopson; Cash considerations	To Phoenix Suns: Isaiah Thomas (sign and trade)
July 12	To Sacramento Kings: Rights to Alex Oriakhi	To Cleveland Cavaliers: Brendan Haywood; Draft rights to 45th pick Dwight Powell
July 13	To Charlotte Hornets: Cash considerations	To Los Angeles Lakers: Jeremy Lin; 2015 first-round pick; 2015 second-round pick
July 13	To New Orleans Pelicans: Scotty Hopson	To Houston Rockets: Rights to Sergei Lishchuk
February 10	To Charlotte Hornets: Mo Williams and Troy Daniels	To Minnesota Timberwolves: Gary Neal and Draft considerations

=== Free agents ===
==== Re-signed ====
Player	Signed	Contract	Ref.
Jannero Pargo	July 25, 2014	One-year	

==== Additions ====
Player	Signed	Former team	Ref.
Marvin Williams	July 21, 2014	Utah Jazz	
Lance Stephenson	July 18, 2014	Indiana Pacers	
Brian Roberts	July 23, 2014	New Orleans Pelicans	
Jason Maxiell	September 28, 2014	Orlando Magic	

==== Subtractions ====
Player	Reason left	Date	New team	Ref.
Josh McRoberts	Free Agent	June 18, 2014	Miami Heat	
Chris Douglas-Roberts	Free Agent	September 3, 2014	Los Angeles Clippers	
Anthony Tolliver	Free Agent	July 21, 2014	Phoenix Suns	
Brendan Haywood	Trade	July 12, 2014	Cleveland Cavaliers	
Luke Ridnour	Free Agent	July 25, 2014	Orlando Magic	
D. J. White	Free Agent	October 4, 2014	(Spain) Laboral Kuxta Vitoria	

== Awards ==
Player	Award	Date awarded	Ref.
