= P. J. Hairston =

American basketball player (born 1992)

Personal information
- Born: December 24, 1992 (age 33) Greensboro, North Carolina, U.S.
- Listed height: 6 ft 6 in (1.98 m)
- Listed weight: 230 lb (104 kg)

Career information
- High school: Dudley (Greensboro, North Carolina); Hargrave (Chatham, Virginia)
- College: North Carolina (2011–2013)
- NBA draft: 2014: 1st round, 26th overall pick
- Drafted by: Miami Heat
- Playing career: 2014–2017
- Position: Small forward / shooting guard
- Number: 19

Career history
- 2014: Texas Legends
- 2014–2016: Charlotte Hornets
- 2016: Memphis Grizzlies
- 2016–2017: Rio Grande Valley Vipers

Career highlights
- NBA D-League All-Rookie Second Team (2014); McDonald's All-American (2011); Third-team Parade All-American (2011)
- Stats at NBA.com
- Stats at Basketball Reference

Samuel Peterson "P. J." Hairston Jr. (born December 24, 1992) is an American former professional basketball player. He played college basketball for the North Carolina Tar Heels. He finished his sophomore season in 2013 and was eligible for the 2014 NBA draft. He was selected with the 26th overall pick in the 2014 NBA draft by the Miami Heat, and was later traded to the Charlotte Hornets in exchange for Shabazz Napier.

== High school career ==
Hairston attended Dudley High School in Greensboro for his first three years of high school. He scored 53 points in one game as a junior. For his senior year of high school, he played at Hargrave Military Academy in Chatham, Virginia and averaged 25.6 points, 9.2 rebounds, and 4.7 assists. He scored 15 points in the 2011 McDonald's All-American Boys Game.

Considered a five-star recruit by ESPN.com, Hairston was listed as the No. 3 shooting guard and the No. 13 player in the nation in 2011.

== College career ==
In 2011, Hairston joined the North Carolina Tar Heels for the 2011–12 season as a freshman. He was the team's eighth-leading scorer at 5.7 points per game and led the team in free-throw percentage.

In the 2012–13 season, Hairston's playing time increased significantly in the second half of the season. In the last five games of the regular season, he averaged 32 minutes of playing time, up 60% from 20 minutes of average playing time in the first 29 games of the season. Hairston led UNC in scoring in the last five games of the season with 19.6 points per game. He earned ACC Co-Player of the Week honors for his play against Duke and Virginia in February 2013. North Carolina coaches also selected Hairston as the defensive player of the game in the win over Virginia.

In Hairston's sophomore season, he was in the starting line-up for the second time in his college career against Duke in February 2013. He scored a then career high 23 points. In his next game in the starting line-up versus Virginia he set a new high with 29 points, just four games after returning the court after missing a game due to a concussion. In UNC's first game of the ACC tournament on March 15, 2013, Hairston was holding the basketball in the second half when a Florida State player swiped Hairston's hand. Either from the swipe, or from his fingers extending on the basketball, Hairston split the webbing between the middle and ring fingers on his non-shooting left hand. Hairston left the game and received eight stitches. He still led UNC with 21 points after making five of six three point shots.

After getting the stitches, Hairston returned to play in UNC's next two games in the ACC tournament. He played 36 minutes in the next game against Maryland and scored 13 points. In the next day's game against Miami he scored 28 points.

Suspended in 2013, Hairston did not return to North Carolina for the 2013–14 season. On December 20, 2013, the school announced that they would not seek his reinstatement.

== Professional career ==
=== Texas Legends (2014) ===
After his suspension was confirmed, Hairston filed paperwork to join the NBA Development League. On January 14, 2014, he was acquired by the Texas Legends. He went on to play 26 games for Texas while averaging 21.8 points, 3.5 rebounds and 1.5 steals per game.

=== Charlotte Hornets (2014–2016) ===
On June 26, 2014, Hairston was selected with the 26th overall pick in the 2014 NBA draft by the Miami Heat on behalf of the Charlotte Hornets. In doing so, Hairston became the first NBA D-League player to be drafted in the first round of an NBA draft. On August 22, he signed with the Hornets after averaging an impressive 18.3 points in seven Summer League games. On December 22, Hairston recorded his first career double-double with 10 points and 10 rebounds to help the Hornets defeat the Denver Nuggets, 110–82. On February 10, 2015, he scored a season-high 16 points in a loss to the Detroit Pistons.

On June 30, 2015, Hairston re-joined the Hornets for the 2015 NBA Summer League. On January 23, 2016, he scored a then career-high 20 points and tied a career-high with 10 rebounds in a 97–84 win over the New York Knicks.

=== Memphis Grizzlies (2016) ===
On February 16, 2016, the Hornets traded Hairston to the Memphis Grizzlies in a three-way deal also involving the Miami Heat. He made an impression early for the Grizzlies, earning the starting shooting guard role and subsequently scoring 17 points on February 24 against the Los Angeles Lakers in just his third game for the team. He went on to score a career-high 21 points on February 26, helping the Grizzlies defeat the Lakers for the second time in three days.

=== Rio Grande Valley Vipers (2016–2017) ===
On September 30, 2016, Hairston signed with the Houston Rockets, but was waived on October 24, 2016. Seven days later, he was acquired by the Rio Grande Valley Vipers of the NBA Development League as an affiliate player of the Rockets.

Hairston announced his retirement from basketball in 2018, having been out of the game for a season.

== Career statistics ==
=== NBA ===
Legend
GP	Games played	GS	Games started	MPG	Minutes per game
FG%	Field goal percentage	3P%	3-point field goal percentage	FT%	Free throw percentage
RPG	Rebounds per game	APG	Assists per game	SPG	Steals per game
BPG	Blocks per game	PPG	Points per game	**Bold**	Career high

==== Regular season ====
Year	Team	GP	GS	MPG	FG%	3P%	FT%	RPG	APG	SPG	BPG	PPG
2014–15	Charlotte	45	2	15.3	.323	.301	**.861**	2.0	.5	**.5**	**.3**	5.6
2015–16	Charlotte	**48**	**43**	19.5	**.359**	**.314**	.810	**2.7**	**.6**	**.5**	.1	6.0
2015–16	Memphis	18	9	**20.9**	.348	.232	.727	2.6	.5	.4	.2	**6.9**
Career		111	54	18.0	.343	.295	.810	2.4	.5	.5	.2	6.0

==== Playoffs ====
Year	Team	GP	GS	MPG	FG%	3P%	FT%	RPG	APG	SPG	BPG	PPG
2016	Memphis	2	0	11.0	.333	.333	.000	.0	.0	.5	.0	2.5
Career		2	0	11.0	.333	.333	.000	.0	.0	.5	.0	2.5

=== College ===
Year	Team	GP	GS	MPG	FG%	3P%	FT%	RPG	APG	SPG	BPG	PPG
2011–12	North Carolina	37	0	13.0	.308	.273	.839	2.2	.8	.4	.2	5.7
2012–13	North Carolina	34	14	23.6	.431	.396	.779	4.3	1.4	1.3	.4	14.6
