= 2014–15 Indiana Pacers season =

NBA professional basketball team season

- Head coach: Frank Vogel
- General manager: Larry Bird
- Owners: Herb Simon
- Arena: Bankers Life Fieldhouse

Results
- Record: 38–44 (.463)
- Place: Division: 4th (Central); Conference: 9th (Eastern)
- Playoff finish: Did not qualify
- Stats at Basketball Reference

The 2014–15 Indiana Pacers season was Indiana's 48th season as a franchise and 39th season in the National Basketball Association (NBA). The Pacers finished fourth in Central Division and ninth in Eastern Conference. The Pacers missed the playoffs for the first time since 2010 after a 56–26 mark from the previous season, following two-straight Eastern Conference Finals appearances. Before the start of the season, storm clouds gathered when superstar forward Paul George seriously injured his leg during a Team USA scrimmage. The injury required immediate surgery. George was originally to be ruled out for the entire season, but as the season progressed, he was talking about returning. He also announced before the season that he would be wearing number 13 and earned the nickname 'PG-13' (his initials and New Jersey number). As the season winded down and after months of rehabilitation, George made his regular-season debut on April 5 in a home game against the Miami Heat. He finished the game with 13 points off the bench and received a standing ovation. George was only able to play the final six games of the season.

This was the last time the Pacers missed the playoffs until 2021.

== Offseason ==
=== Draft picks ===
| Round | Pick | Player | Position | Nationality | School/club team |
|---|---|---|---|---|---|
| 2 | 57 | Louis Labeyrie | PF/C | France | Paris-Levallois Basket (France) |

== Standings ==
| Central Division | W | L | PCT | GB | Home | Road | Div | GP |
|---|---|---|---|---|---|---|---|---|
| y-Cleveland Cavaliers | 53 | 29 | .646 | – | 31‍–‍10 | 22‍–‍19 | 11–5 | 82 |
| x-Chicago Bulls | 50 | 32 | .610 | 3.0 | 27‍–‍14 | 23‍–‍18 | 8–8 | 82 |
| x-Milwaukee Bucks | 41 | 41 | .500 | 12.0 | 23‍–‍18 | 18‍–‍23 | 7–9 | 82 |
| Indiana Pacers | 38 | 44 | .463 | 15.0 | 23‍–‍18 | 15‍–‍26 | 8–8 | 82 |
| Detroit Pistons | 32 | 50 | .390 | 21.0 | 18‍–‍23 | 14‍–‍27 | 6–10 | 82 |

Eastern Conference
| # | Team | W | L | PCT | GB | GP |
|---|---|---|---|---|---|---|
| 1 | c-Atlanta Hawks * | 60 | 22 | .732 | – | 82 |
| 2 | y-Cleveland Cavaliers * | 53 | 29 | .646 | 7.0 | 82 |
| 3 | x-Chicago Bulls | 50 | 32 | .610 | 10.0 | 82 |
| 4 | y-Toronto Raptors * | 49 | 33 | .598 | 11.0 | 82 |
| 5 | x-Washington Wizards | 46 | 36 | .561 | 14.0 | 82 |
| 6 | x-Milwaukee Bucks | 41 | 41 | .500 | 19.0 | 82 |
| 7 | x-Boston Celtics | 40 | 42 | .488 | 20.0 | 82 |
| 8 | x-Brooklyn Nets | 38 | 44 | .463 | 22.0 | 82 |
| 9 | Indiana Pacers | 38 | 44 | .463 | 22.0 | 82 |
| 10 | Miami Heat | 37 | 45 | .451 | 23.0 | 82 |
| 11 | Charlotte Hornets | 33 | 49 | .402 | 27.0 | 82 |
| 12 | Detroit Pistons | 32 | 50 | .390 | 28.0 | 82 |
| 13 | Orlando Magic | 25 | 57 | .305 | 35.0 | 82 |
| 14 | Philadelphia 76ers | 18 | 64 | .220 | 42.0 | 82 |
| 15 | New York Knicks | 17 | 65 | .207 | 43.0 | 82 |

== Game log ==
=== Preseason ===
2014 pre-season game log
Total: 3–4 (Home: 2–1; Road: 1–3)
Pre-season: 3–4 (home: 2–1; road: 1–3)

| Game | Date | Team | Score | High points | High rebounds | High assists | Location Attendance | Record |
|---|---|---|---|---|---|---|---|---|
| 1 | October 7 | Minnesota | W 103–90 | George Hill (17) | Lavoy Allen (7) | George Hill (7) | Bankers Life Fieldhouse 13,160 | 1–0 |
| 2 | October 10 | Orlando | L 93–96 | Donald Sloan (16) | Luis Scola (9) | George Hill (4) | Bankers Life Fieldhouse 16,111 | 1–1 |
| 3 | October 12 | @ Dallas | L 98–106 | C. J. Miles (19) | Lavoy Allen (8) | Damjan Rudež (6) | American Airlines Center 17,971 | 1–2 |
| 4 | October 15 | @ Cleveland | L 93–98 | Chris Copeland (16) | Ian Mahinmi (7) | George Hill (5) | Cintas Center 10,250 | 1–3 |
| 5 | October 18 | Dallas | W 98–93 | Chris Copeland (22) | George Hill (9) | George Hill (6) | Bankers Life Fieldhouse 15,748 | 2–3 |
| 6 | October 21 | @ Minnesota | L 89–107 | Donald Sloan (19) | Roy Hibbert (9) | Donald Sloan (5) | Target Center 8,660 | 2–4 |
| 7 | October 23 | @ Charlotte | W 88–79 | C. J. Miles (23) | Luis Scola (12) | Donald Sloan (8) | Time Warner Cable Arena 8,529 | 3–4 |

2014–15 season schedule

=== Regular season ===
2014–15 game log
Total: 38–44 (Home: 23–18; Road: 15–26)
October: 1–1 (home: 1–1; road: 0–0)

| Game | Date | Team | Score | High points | High rebounds | High assists | Location Attendance | Record |
|---|---|---|---|---|---|---|---|---|
| 1 | October 29 | Philadelphia | W 103–91 | Roy Hibbert (22) | Donald Sloan (10) | Donald Sloan (6) | Bankers Life Fieldhouse; 18,165 | 1–0 |
| 2 | October 31 | Memphis | L 89–97 | Chris Copeland (16) | Lavoy Allen (10) | Donald Sloan (7) | Bankers Life Fieldhouse; 14,441 | 1–1 |

November : 6–9 (home: 3–4; road: 3–5)

| Game | Date | Team | Score | High points | High rebounds | High assists | Location Attendance | Record |
|---|---|---|---|---|---|---|---|---|
| 3 | November 1 | @ Atlanta | L 92–102 | Chris Copeland (21) | Roy Hibbert (12) | Donald Sloan (7) | Philips Arena; 19,118 | 1–2 |
| 4 | November 4 | Milwaukee | L 81–87 | Chris Copeland (19) | Lavoy Allen (12) | Donald Sloan (6) | Bankers Life Fieldhouse; 15,012 | 1–3 |
| 5 | November 5 | @ Washington | L 94–96 (OT) | Donald Sloan (31) | Chris Copeland (12) | Donald Sloan (7) | Verizon Center; 15,268 | 1–4 |
| 6 | November 7 | @ Boston | L 98–101 | Roy Hibbert (22) | Roy Hibbert (11) | Sloan, Copeland, Price (4) | TD Garden; 17,122 | 1–5 |
| 7 | November 8 | Washington | L 90–97 | Solomon Hill (28) | Luis Scola (8) | A. J. Price (4) | Bankers Life Fieldhouse; 17,302 | 1–6 |
| 8 | November 10 | Utah | W 97–86 | Roy Hibbert (29) | Lavoy Allen (15) | Sloan, Scola, Allen (3) | Bankers Life Fieldhouse; 12,513 | 2–6 |
| 9 | November 12 | @ Miami | W 81–75 | Chris Copeland (17) | Roy Hibbert (15) | Sloan & Scola (3) | AmericanAirlines Arena; 19,658 | 3–6 |
| 10 | November 14 | Denver | L 87–108 | A. J. Price (14) | Ian Mahinmi (10) | Sloan & Price (4) | Bankers Life Fieldhouse; 16,286 | 3–7 |
| 11 | November 15 | @ Chicago | W 99–90 | S. Hill, Scola, Price (21) | Solomon Hill (12) | Donald Sloan (7) | United Center; 22,248 | 4–7 |
| 12 | November 19 | Charlotte | W 88–86 | Roy Hibbert (18) | Roy Hibbert (11) | Donald Sloan (6) | Bankers Life Fieldhouse; 14,748 | 5–7 |
| 13 | November 22 | Phoenix | L 83–106 | Rodney Stuckey (14) | Mahinmi, Scola (10) | Donald Sloan (6) | Bankers Life Fieldhouse; 16,870 | 5–8 |
| 14 | November 24 | @ Dallas | W 111–100 | Donald Sloan (29) | Luis Scola (11) | Sloan & Stuckey (5) | American Airlines Center; 19,850 | 6–8 |
| 15 | November 26 | @ San Antonio | L 100–107 | Rodney Stuckey (22) | Lavoy Allen (9) | Donald Sloan (6) | AT&T Center; 18,581 | 6–9 |
| 16 | November 28 | Orlando | W 98–83 | Rodney Stuckey (24) | Lavoy Allen (14) | Donald Sloan (6) | Bankers Life Fieldhouse; 18,165 | 7–9 |
| 17 | November 29 | @ Cleveland | L 97–109 | David West (14) | Ian Mahinmi (10) | Donald Sloan (6) | Quicken Loans Arena; 20,562 | 7–10 |

December : 5–11 (home: 3–4; road: 2–7)

| Game | Date | Team | Score | High points | High rebounds | High assists | Location Attendance | Record |
|---|---|---|---|---|---|---|---|---|
| 18 | December 2 | @ Phoenix | L 99–116 | C.J. Miles (17) | Roy Hibbert (10) | C.J. Watson (7) | US Airways Center; 15,059 | 7–11 |
| 19 | December 4 | @ Portland | L 82–88 | Rodney Stuckey (16) | Ian Mahinmi (10) | Rodney Stuckey (5) | Moda Center; 19,191 | 7–12 |
| 20 | December 5 | @ Sacramento | L 101–102 (OT) | David West (16) | West & Scola (8) | Stuckey, S. Hill & Watson (3) | Sleep Train Arena1; 5,512 | 7–13 |
| 21 | December 8 | Atlanta | L 92–108 | Stuckey & Miles (15) | Luis Scola (9) | Solomon Hill (6) | Bankers Life Fieldhouse; 14,519 | 7–14 |
| 22 | December 10 | L.A. Clippers | L 96–103 | C.J. Miles (30) | Luis Scola (14) | C.J. Watson (7) | Bankers Life Fieldhouse; 16,392 | 7–15 |
| 23 | December 12 | @ Toronto | L 94–106 | Solomon Hill (16) | David West (7) | David West (5) | Air Canada Centre; 19,800 | 7–16 |
| 24 | December 13 | Portland | L 85–95 | C.J. Watson (23) | Rodney Stuckey (14) | David West (6) | Bankers Life Fieldhouse; 17,206 | 7–17 |
| 25 | December 15 | L.A. Lakers | W 110–91 | Stuckey & Miles (20) | Rodney Stuckey (10) | Rodney Stuckey (7) | Bankers Life Fieldhouse; 15,261 | 8–17 |
| 26 | December 17 | @ L.A. Clippers | L 100–102 | West & Miles (20) | Lavoy Allen (14) | Solomon Hill (6) | Staples Center; 19,060 | 8–18 |
| 27 | December 20 | @ Denver | L 73–76 | David West (19) | West & Allen (20) | David West (5) | Pepsi Center; 14,125 | 8–19 |
| 28 | December 21 | @ Minnesota | W 100–96 | C.J. Miles (28) | Roy Hibbert (8) | Donald Sloan (7) | Target Center; 12,687 | 9–19 |
| 29 | December 23 | New Orleans | W 96–84 | George Hill (15) | West & Allen (7) | David West (5) | Bankers Life Fieldhouse; 17,336 | 10–19 |
| 30 | December 26 | @ Detroit | L 109–119 | Roy Hibbert (19) | David West (11) | C.J. Watson (6) | The Palace of Auburn Hills; 13,408 | 10–20 |
| 31 | December 27 | @ Brooklyn | W 110–85 | Rodney Stuckey (20) | C.J. Watson (9) | Rodney Stuckey (8) | Barclays Center; 17,732 | 11–20 |
| 32 | December 29 | Chicago | L 90–92 | Chris Copeland (17) | Scola & Allen (8) | Lavoy Allen (6) | Bankers Life Fieldhouse; 18,165 | 11–21 |
| 33 | December 31 | Miami | W 106–95 | C.J. Miles (25) | Roy Hibbert (10) | West, Miles & Watson (4) | Bankers Life Fieldhouse; 18,165 | 12–21 |

January : 5–11 (home: 2–4; road: 3–7)

| Game | Date | Team | Score | High points | High rebounds | High assists | Location Attendance | Record |
|---|---|---|---|---|---|---|---|---|
| 34 | January 2 | @ Milwaukee | W 94–91 | C.J. Miles (22) | West & Sloan (8) | Donald Sloan (6) | BMO Harris Bradley Center; 16,238 | 13–21 |
| 35 | January 4 | @ L.A. Lakers | L 87–88 | C.J. Miles (19) | Roy Hibbert (11) | Donald Sloan (9) | Staples Center; 18,997 | 13–22 |
| 36 | January 5 | @ Utah | W 105–101 | Roy Hibbert (22) | Roy Hibbert (8) | David West (6) | EnergySolutions Arena; 17,378 | 14–22 |
| 37 | January 7 | @ Golden State | L 102–117 | Solomon Hill (21) | Lavoy Allen (9) | David West (6) | Oracle Arena; 19,596 | 14–23 |
| 38 | January 9 | Boston | W 107–103 (OT) | Roy Hibbert (19) | Roy Hibbert (11) | Stuckey, Sloan & Hibbert (4) | Bankers Life Fieldhouse; 18,165 | 15–23 |
| 39 | January 10 | @ Philadelphia | L 92–93 | David West (28) | Roy Hibbert (13) | C.J. Watson (4) | Wells Fargo Center; 17,496 | 15–24 |
| 40 | January 13 | Minnesota | L 101–110 | C.J. Miles (22) | Roy Hibbert (8) | Sloan & Watson (5) | Bankers Life Fieldhouse; 16,781 | 15–25 |
| 41 | January 16 | Detroit | L 96–98 | Roy Hibbert (14) | Ian Mahinmi (9) | Sloan & Stuckey (5) | Bankers Life Fieldhouse; 17,558 | 15–26 |
| 42 | January 17 | @ Charlotte | L 71–80 (OT) | David West (19) | Roy Hibbert (14) | Sloan & Stuckey (4) | Time Warner Cable Arena; 19,285 | 15–27 |
| 43 | January 19 | @ Houston | L 98–110 | C.J. Miles (23) | Ian Mahinmi (14) | Donald Sloan (6) | Toyota Center; 18,266 | 15–28 |
| 44 | January 21 | @ Atlanta | L 91–110 | C.J. Miles (18) | David West (11) | Donald Sloan (5) | Philips Arena; 15,045 | 15–29 |
| 45 | January 23 | @ Miami | L 87–89 | Luis Scola (14) | David West (9) | Rodney Stuckey (3) | AmericanAirlines Arena; 19,693 | 15–30 |
| 46 | January 25 | @ Orlando | W 106–99 | David West (20) | Roy Hibbert (13) | C.J. Watson (8) | Amway Center; 16,704 | 16–30 |
| 47 | January 27 | Toronto | L 91–104 | Rodney Stuckey (22) | Roy Hibbert (8) | David West (5) | Bankers Life Fieldhouse; 16,204 | 16–31 |
| 48 | January 29 | New York | W 103–82 | Rodney Stuckey (22) | Roy Hibbert (8) | David West (6) | Bankers Life Fieldhouse; 15,665 | 17–31 |
| 49 | January 31 | Sacramento | L 94–99 | West & Miles (17) | Roy Hibbert (7) | C.J. Watson (5) | Bankers Life Fieldhouse; 18,165 | 17–32 |

February : 7–2 (home: 4–1; road: 3–1)

| Game | Date | Team | Score | High points | High rebounds | High assists | Location Attendance | Record |
|---|---|---|---|---|---|---|---|---|
| 50 | February 4 | Detroit | W 114–109 | George Hill (20) | Roy Hibbert (12) | George Hill (6) | Bankers Life Fieldhouse; 15,892 | 18–32 |
| 51 | February 6 | Cleveland | W 103–99 | C.J. Miles (26) | David West (13) | George Hill (7) | Bankers Life Fieldhouse; 18,165 | 19–32 |
| 52 | February 8 | @ Charlotte | W 103–102 | C.J. Watson (22) | Luis Scola (14) | G. Hill, Scola, S. Hill & Watson (3) | Time Warner Cable Arena; 16,991 | 20–32 |
| 53 | February 9 | San Antonio | L 93–95 | Rodney Stuckey (18) | David West (18) | David West (7) | Bankers Life Fieldhouse; 16,691 | 20–33 |
| 54 | February 11 | @ New Orleans | W 106–93 | G. Hill & West (17) | Ian Mahinmi (8) | George Hill (9) | Smoothie King Center; 17,074 | 21–33 |
All-Star Break
| 55 | February 20 | @ Philadelphia | W 106–95 | Rodney Stuckey (30) | West & Hibbert & Scola (4) | G. Hill & West & Stuckey & Miles (4) | Wells Fargo Center; 16,777 | 22–33 |
| 56 | February 22 | Golden State | W 104–98 | Rodney Stuckey (30) | C.J. Miles (9) | Stuckey & Miles (5) | Bankers Life Fieldhouse; 16,777 | 23–33 |
| 57 | February 24 | @ Oklahoma City | L 92–105 | C.J. Miles (21) | Roy Hibbert (10) | George Hill (8) | Chesapeake Energy Arena; 18,203 | 23–34 |
| 58 | February 27 | Cleveland | W 93–86 | Rodney Stuckey (19) | George Hill (10) | George Hill (12) | Bankers Life Fieldhouse; 18,165 | 24–34 |

March : 8–8 (home: 6–4; road: 2–4)

| Game | Date | Team | Score | High points | High rebounds | High assists | Location Attendance | Record |
|---|---|---|---|---|---|---|---|---|
| 59 | March 1 | Philadelphia | W 94–74 | George Hill (17) | Roy Hibbert (15) | Stuckey & Hill (4) | Bankers Life Fieldhouse; 16,581 | 25–34 |
| 60 | March 4 | New York | W 105–82 | George Hill (21) | Ian Mahinmi (8) | George Hill (6) | Bankers Life Fieldhouse; 15,981 | 26–34 |
| 61 | March 6 | Chicago | W 98–84 | Solomon Hill (16) | David West (10) | George Hill (9) | Bankers Life Fieldhouse; 18,165 | 27–34 |
| 62 | March 7 | @ New York | W 92–86 | Rodney Stuckey (17) | West & Hibbert (11) | Rodney Stuckey (4) | Madison Square Garden; 19,812 | 28–34 |
| 63 | March 10 | Orlando | W 118–86 | Rodney Stuckey (34) | Scola & Mahinmi (10) | Rodney Stuckey (7) | Bankers Life Fieldhouse; 17,295 | 29–34 |
| 64 | March 12 | Milwaukee | W 109–103 (OT) | Rodney Stuckey (25) | Luis Scola (15) | Rodney Stuckey (6) | Bankers Life Fieldhouse; 15,729 | 30–34 |
| 65 | March 14 | Boston | L 89–93 | George Hill (30) | Hibbert & Mahinmi (7) | George Hill (8) | Bankers Life Fieldhouse; 18,165 | 30–35 |
| 66 | March 16 | Toronto | L 98–117 | George Hill (23) | David West (9) | Stuckey & Hill (4) | Bankers Life Fieldhouse; 17,060 | 30–36 |
| 67 | March 18 | @ Chicago | L 86–103 | Solomon Hill (17) | Luis Scola (7) | David West (7) | United Center; 21,753 | 30–37 |
| 68 | March 20 | @ Cleveland | L 92–95 | George Hill (24) | Luis Scola (11) | Watson & Hill (5) | Quicken Loans Arena; 20,562 | 30–38 |
| 69 | March 21 | Brooklyn | L 111–123 | George Hill (18) | Ian Mahinmi (7) | George Hill (9) | Bankers Life Fieldhouse; 16,453 | 30–39 |
| 70 | March 23 | Houston | L 100–110 | C.J. Watson (23) | Roy Hibbert (10) | West & Watson (5) | Bankers Life Fieldhouse; 16,201 | 30–40 |
| 71 | March 25 | @ Washington | W 103–101 | George Hill (29) | David West (11) | George Hill (9) | Verizon Center; 18,514 | 31–40 |
| 72 | March 26 | @ Milwaukee | L 107–111 | C.J. Miles (26) | Luis Scola (9) | C.J. Watson (7) | BMO Harris Bradley Center; 15,366 | 31–41 |
| 73 | March 29 | Dallas | W 104–99 | C.J. Miles (28) | Roy Hibbert (7) | Solomon Hill (6) | Bankers Life Fieldhouse; 17,358 | 32–41 |
| 74 | March 31 | @ Brooklyn | L 106–111 | George Hill (28) | Luis Scola (9) | Watson & David West (6) | Barclays Center; 16,756 | 32–42 |

April : 6–2 (home: 4–0; road: 2–2)

| Game | Date | Team | Score | High points | High rebounds | High assists | Location Attendance | Record |
|---|---|---|---|---|---|---|---|---|
| 75 | April 1 | @ Boston | L 87–100 | George Hill (21) | David West (8) | George Hill (6) | TD Garden; 18,624 | 32–43 |
| 76 | April 3 | Charlotte | W 93–74 | Rodney Stuckey (15) | Luis Scola (11) | George Hill (10) | Bankers Life Fieldhouse; 18,165 | 33–43 |
| 77 | April 5 | Miami | W 112–89 | Luis Scola (23) | Luis Scola (12) | Rodney Stuckey (7) | Bankers Life Fieldhouse; 18,165 | 34–43 |
| 78 | April 8 | @ New York | W 101–86 | George Hill (20) | Roy Hibbert (11) | Donald Sloan (6) | Madison Square Garden; 19,812 | 35–43 |
| 79 | April 10 | @ Detroit | W 107–103 | Stuckey & Miles (24) | Roy Hibbert (11) | George Hill (9) | Palace of Auburn Hills; 18,561 | 36–43 |
| 80 | April 12 | Oklahoma City | W 116–104 | C.J. Miles (30) | Hibbert & Miles (10) | George Hill (7) | Bankers Life Fieldhouse; 18,165 | 37–43 |
| 81 | April 14 | Washington | W 99–95 (2OT) | C.J. Miles (25) | Roy Hibbert (12) | George Hill (10) | Bankers Life Fieldhouse; 18,165 | 38–43 |
| 82 | April 15 | @ Memphis | L 83–95 | C.J. Miles (26) | G. Hill & Mahinmi (5) | George Hill (6) | FedExForum; 17,109 | 38–44 |

2014–15 season schedule

== Injuries ==
| Player | Duration | | Injury type | Games missed |
| Player | Start | End | Injury type | Games missed |

== Roster ==
2014–15 Indiana Pacers roster
Players

| Pos. | No. | Player | Height | Weight | DOB | From |
|---|---|---|---|---|---|---|
| F/C | 5 | Lavoy Allen | 6 ft 9 in (2.06 m) | 255 lb (116 kg) | 1989–02–04 | Temple |
| F | 22 | Chris Copeland | 6 ft 8 in (2.03 m) | 235 lb (107 kg) | 1984–03–17 | Colorado |
| G/F | 13 | Paul George | 6 ft 9 in (2.06 m) | 220 lb (100 kg) | 1990–05–02 | Fresno State |
| C | 55 | Roy Hibbert | 7 ft 2 in (2.18 m) | 290 lb (132 kg) | 1986–12–11 | Georgetown |
| G | 3 | George Hill | 6 ft 3 in (1.91 m) | 188 lb (85 kg) | 1986–05–04 | IUPUI |
| F | 44 | Solomon Hill | 6 ft 7 in (2.01 m) | 225 lb (102 kg) | 1991–03–18 | Arizona |
| C | 28 | Ian Mahinmi | 6 ft 11 in (2.11 m) | 250 lb (113 kg) | 1986–11–05 | France |
| G/F | 0 | C. J. Miles | 6 ft 6 in (1.98 m) | 231 lb (105 kg) | 1987–03–18 | Skyline HS (TX) |
| F | 9 | Damjan Rudež | 6 ft 10 in (2.08 m) | 201 lb (91 kg) | 1986–06–17 | Croatia |
| F | 4 | Luis Scola | 6 ft 9 in (2.06 m) | 240 lb (109 kg) | 1980–04–30 | Argentina |
| G | 15 | Donald Sloan (waived) | 6 ft 3 in (1.91 m) | 205 lb (93 kg) | 1988–01–15 | Texas A&M |
| G | 2 | Rodney Stuckey | 6 ft 5 in (1.96 m) | 205 lb (93 kg) | 1986–04–21 | Eastern Washington |
| G | 32 | C. J. Watson | 6 ft 2 in (1.88 m) | 175 lb (79 kg) | 1984–04–17 | Tennessee |
| F | 21 | David West | 6 ft 9 in (2.06 m) | 250 lb (113 kg) | 1980–08–29 | Xavier |
| C | 42 | Shayne Whittington (DL) | 7 ft 2 in (2.18 m) | 250 lb (113 kg) | 1991–03–03 | Western Michigan |

Coaches
Head coach
- Frank Vogel
Assistant(s)
- Dan Burke
- Popeye Jones
- Nate McMillan

Legend
- (DP) Unsigned draft pick
- (FA) Free agent
- (S) Suspended
- (DL) On assignment to D-League affiliate
- Injured

Roster
Updated: April 8, 2015

== Player statistics ==
=== Regular season ===
| Player | POS | GP | GS | MP | REB | AST | STL | BLK | PTS | MPG | RPG | APG | SPG | BPG | PPG |
|---|---|---|---|---|---|---|---|---|---|---|---|---|---|---|---|
| Solomon Hill | SF | 82 | 78 | 2,381 | 314 | 184 | 66 | 18 | 729 | 29.0 | 3.8 | 2.2 | .8 | .2 | 8.9 |
| Luis Scola | PF | 81 | 16 | 1,659 | 526 | 105 | 47 | 18 | 763 | 20.5 | 6.5 | 1.3 | .6 | .2 | 9.4 |
| Roy Hibbert | C | 76 | 76 | 1,926 | 540 | 84 | 18 | 125 | 802 | 25.3 | 7.1 | 1.1 | .2 | 1.6 | 10.6 |
| Rodney Stuckey | PG | 71 | 36 | 1,874 | 248 | 219 | 56 | 10 | 896 | 26.4 | 3.5 | 3.1 | .8 | .1 | 12.6 |
| C. J. Miles | SG | 70 | 40 | 1,841 | 214 | 75 | 60 | 26 | 942 | 26.3 | 3.1 | 1.1 | .9 | .4 | 13.5 |
| Damjan Rudež | SF | 68 | 2 | 1,047 | 47 | 53 | 16 | 5 | 323 | 15.4 | .7 | .8 | .2 | .1 | 4.8 |
| David West | PF | 66 | 66 | 1,895 | 449 | 223 | 48 | 48 | 769 | 28.7 | 6.8 | 3.4 | .7 | .7 | 11.7 |
| Lavoy Allen | C | 63 | 0 | 1,070 | 323 | 73 | 15 | 42 | 315 | 17.0 | 5.1 | 1.2 | .2 | .7 | 5.0 |
| Ian Mahinmi | C | 61 | 6 | 1,146 | 356 | 33 | 30 | 46 | 265 | 18.8 | 5.8 | .5 | .5 | .8 | 4.3 |
| C. J. Watson | PG | 57 | 21 | 1,422 | 163 | 208 | 57 | 9 | 570 | 24.9 | 2.9 | 3.6 | 1.0 | .2 | 10.0 |
| Donald Sloan | PG | 53 | 21 | 1,107 | 143 | 190 | 23 | 0 | 391 | 20.9 | 2.7 | 3.6 | .4 | .0 | 7.4 |
| Chris Copeland | SF | 50 | 12 | 828 | 111 | 51 | 11 | 11 | 309 | 16.6 | 2.2 | 1.0 | .2 | .2 | 6.2 |
| George Hill | PG | 43 | 36 | 1,267 | 179 | 220 | 44 | 14 | 692 | 29.5 | 4.2 | 5.1 | 1.0 | .3 | 16.1 |
| Shayne Whittington | PF | 20 | 0 | 108 | 29 | 6 | 5 | 2 | 57 | 5.4 | 1.5 | .3 | .3 | .1 | 2.9 |
| A. J. Price^{†} | PG | 10 | 0 | 193 | 14 | 27 | 4 | 0 | 105 | 19.3 | 1.4 | 2.7 | .4 | .0 | 10.5 |
| Paul George | SF | 6 | 0 | 91 | 22 | 6 | 5 | 1 | 53 | 15.2 | 3.7 | 1.0 | .8 | .2 | 8.8 |

- ^{†} Denotes player spent time with another team in the season. Stats reflect time with the Pacers only.

== Transactions ==
=== Free agents ===
==== Re-signed ====
| Player | Signed | Contract | Ref. |

==== Additions ====
| Player | Signed | Former team | Ref. |

==== Subtractions ====
| Player | Reason left | Date | New team | Ref. |

== Awards ==
| Player | Award | Date awarded | Ref. |
