= 2014–15 Orlando Magic season =

NBA professional basketball team season

- Head coach: Jacque Vaughn (fired on February 5); James Borrego
- Owners: RDV Sports, Inc.
- Arena: Amway Center

Results
- Record: 25–57 (.305)
- Place: Division: 5th (Southeast); Conference: 13th (Eastern)
- Playoff finish: Did not qualify
- Stats at Basketball Reference

Local media
- Television: Fox Sports Florida, Sun Sports
- Radio: WDBO

The 2014–15 Orlando Magic season was the 26th season of the franchise in the National Basketball Association (NBA). The Magic looked to improve on their 23–59 record the previous season where they had finished 5th in the Southeastern division and 13th in the Eastern Conference. While they did improve their record by two games, they still finished 5th and 13th in the division and conference, respectively.

== Preseason ==
=== Draft picks ===
| Round | Pick | Player | Position | Nationality | College |
|---|---|---|---|---|---|
| 1 | 4 | Aaron Gordon | PF | United States | Arizona |
| 1 | 12 | Dario Šarić | SF | Croatia | Anadolu Efes (Turkey) |
| 2 | 56 | Roy Devyn Marble | SG | United States | Iowa |

== Regular season ==
| Southeast Division | W | L | PCT | GB | Home | Road | Div | GP |
|---|---|---|---|---|---|---|---|---|
| c-Atlanta Hawks | 60 | 22 | .732 | – | 35‍–‍6 | 25‍–‍16 | 12–4 | 82 |
| x-Washington Wizards | 46 | 36 | .561 | 14.0 | 29‍–‍12 | 17‍–‍24 | 10–6 | 82 |
| Miami Heat | 37 | 45 | .451 | 23.0 | 20‍–‍21 | 17‍–‍24 | 6–10 | 82 |
| Charlotte Hornets | 33 | 49 | .402 | 27.0 | 19‍–‍22 | 14‍–‍27 | 8–8 | 82 |
| Orlando Magic | 25 | 57 | .305 | 35.0 | 13‍–‍28 | 12‍–‍29 | 4–12 | 82 |

=== Standings ===
Eastern Conference
| # | Team | W | L | PCT | GB | GP |
|---|---|---|---|---|---|---|
| 1 | c-Atlanta Hawks * | 60 | 22 | .732 | – | 82 |
| 2 | y-Cleveland Cavaliers * | 53 | 29 | .646 | 7.0 | 82 |
| 3 | x-Chicago Bulls | 50 | 32 | .610 | 10.0 | 82 |
| 4 | y-Toronto Raptors * | 49 | 33 | .598 | 11.0 | 82 |
| 5 | x-Washington Wizards | 46 | 36 | .561 | 14.0 | 82 |
| 6 | x-Milwaukee Bucks | 41 | 41 | .500 | 19.0 | 82 |
| 7 | x-Boston Celtics | 40 | 42 | .488 | 20.0 | 82 |
| 8 | x-Brooklyn Nets | 38 | 44 | .463 | 22.0 | 82 |
| 9 | Indiana Pacers | 38 | 44 | .463 | 22.0 | 82 |
| 10 | Miami Heat | 37 | 45 | .451 | 23.0 | 82 |
| 11 | Charlotte Hornets | 33 | 49 | .402 | 27.0 | 82 |
| 12 | Detroit Pistons | 32 | 50 | .390 | 28.0 | 82 |
| 13 | Orlando Magic | 25 | 57 | .305 | 35.0 | 82 |
| 14 | Philadelphia 76ers | 18 | 64 | .220 | 42.0 | 82 |
| 15 | New York Knicks | 17 | 65 | .207 | 43.0 | 82 |

== Game log ==
=== Regular season ===
2014–15 game log
-Total: 25–57 (Home: 13–28; Road: 12–29)
October: 0–2 (home: 0–1; road: 0–1)

| Game | Date | Team | Score | High points | High rebounds | High assists | Location Attendance | Record |
|---|---|---|---|---|---|---|---|---|
| 1 | October 28 | @ New Orleans | L 84–101 | Tobias Harris (25) | Nikola Vučević (23) | Elfrid Payton (7) | Smoothie King Center; 17,907 | 0–1 |
| 2 | October 30 | Washington | L 98–105 | Nikola Vučević (23) | Nikola Vučević (12) | Elfrid Payton (7) | Amway Center; 18,846 | 0–2 |

November : 7–10 (home: 2–4; road: 5–6)

| Game | Date | Team | Score | High points | High rebounds | High assists | Location Attendance | Record |
|---|---|---|---|---|---|---|---|---|
| 3 | November 1 | Toronto | L 95–108 | Evan Fournier (18) | Nikola Vučević (12) | Elfrid Payton (9) | Amway Center; 16,141 | 0–3 |
| 4 | November 4 | @ Chicago | L 90–98 | Tobias Harris (21) | Nikola Vučević (13) | Elfrid Payton (7) | United Center; 21,809 | 0–4 |
| 5 | November 5 | @ Philadelphia | W 91–89 | Tobias Harris (18) | Channing Frye (11) | Elfrid Payton (5) | Wells Fargo Center; 12,111 | 1–4 |
| 6 | November 7 | Minnesota | W 112–103 (OT) | Evan Fournier (20) | Tobias Harris (16) | Elfrid Payton (4) | Amway Center; 16,379 | 2–4 |
| 7 | November 9 | @ Brooklyn | L 96–104 | Nikola Vučević (27) | Nikola Vučević (12) | Elfrid Payton (6) | Barclays Center; 16,127 | 2–5 |
| 8 | November 11 | @ Toronto | L 100–104 | Evan Fournier (24) | Tobias Harris (13) | Ridnour, Vučević (6) | Air Canada Centre; 19,800 | 2–6 |
| 9 | November 12 | @ New York | W 97–95 | Evan Fournier (28) | Nikola Vučević (13) | Elfrid Payton (8) | Madison Square Garden; 19,812 | 3–6 |
| 10 | November 14 | Milwaukee | W 101–85 | Tobias Harris (26) | Tobias Harris (10) | Nikola Vučević (4) | Amway Center; 15,957 | 4–6 |
| 11 | November 15 | @ Washington | L 93–98 | Tobias Harris (19) | Nikola Vučević (11) | Victor Oladipo (7) | Verizon Center; 19,110 | 4–7 |
| 12 | November 17 | @ Detroit | W 107–93 | Nikola Vučević (25) | Nikola Vučević (14) | Evan Fournier (8) | The Palace of Auburn Hills; 11,619 | 5–7 |
| 13 | November 19 | L.A. Clippers | L 90–114 | Tobias Harris (25) | Nikola Vučević (14) | Elfrid Payton (5) | Amway Center; 16,034 | 5–8 |
| 14 | November 21 | @ Charlotte | W 105–100 | Evan Fournier (21) | Tobias Harris (16) | Elfrid Payton (5) | Time Warner Cable Arena; 18,126 | 6–8 |
| 15 | November 22 | Miami | L 92–99 | Nikola Vučević (33) | Nikola Vučević (17) | Evan Fournier (6) | Amway Center; 18,846 | 6–9 |
| 16 | November 24 | @ Cleveland | L 74–106 | Victor Oladipo (22) | Nikola Vučević (13) | Maurice Harkless (4) | Quicken Loans Arena; 20,562 | 6–10 |
| 17 | November 26 | Golden State | L 96–111 | Tobias Harris (16) | Nikola Vučević (13) | Elfrid Payton (5) | Amway Center; 17,202 | 6–11 |
| 18 | November 28 | @ Indiana | L 83–98 | Nikola Vučević (16) | Nikola Vučević (7) | Elfrid Payton (6) | Bankers Life Fieldhouse; 18,165 | 6–12 |
| 19 | November 30 | @ Phoenix | W 93–90 | Tobias Harris (21) | Elfrid Payton (9) | Oladipo, Payton (4) | US Airways Center; 15,558 | 7–12 |

December : 6–10 (home: 2–5; road: 4–5)

| Game | Date | Team | Score | High points | High rebounds | High assists | Location Attendance | Record |
|---|---|---|---|---|---|---|---|---|
| 20 | December 2 | @ Golden State | L 97–98 | Victor Oladipo (27) | Kyle O'Quinn (11) | Elfrid Payton (6) | Oracle Arena; 19,596 | 7–13 |
| 21 | December 3 | @ L.A. Clippers | L 86–114 | Tobias Harris (16) | Dedmon, Harris (8) | Elfrid Payton (6) | Staples Center; 19,060 | 7–14 |
| 22 | December 5 | @ Utah | W 98–93 | Tobias Harris (22) | Dewayne Dedmon (9) | Victor Oladipo (6) | EnergySolutions Arena; 18,997 | 8–14 |
| 23 | December 6 | @ Sacramento | W 105–96 | Tobias Harris (27) | Dewayne Dedmon (8) | Victor Oladipo (7) | Sleep Train Arena; 16,021 | 9–14 |
| 24 | December 10 | Washington | L 89–91 | Victor Oladipo (17) | Dewayne Dedmon (7) | O'Quinn, Payton (4) | Amway Center; 16,081 | 9–15 |
| 25 | December 12 | @ Atlanta | L 81–87 | Victor Oladipo (21) | Tobias Harris (11) | Evan Fournier (4) | Philips Arena; 13,247 | 9–16 |
| 26 | December 13 | Atlanta | W 100–99 | Tobias Harris (20) | Nikola Vučević (11) | Oladipo, Payton (7) | Amway Center; 15,939 | 10–16 |
| 27 | December 15 | @ Toronto | L 82–95 | Tobias Harris (18) | Nikola Vučević (9) | Victor Oladipo (4) | Air Canada Centre; 19,800 | 10–17 |
| 28 | December 17 | @ Boston | L 92–109 | Nikola Vučević (18) | Nikola Vučević (13) | Fournier, Payton (4) | TD Garden; 16,764 | 10–18 |
| 29 | December 19 | Utah | L 94–101 | Tobias Harris (24) | Nikola Vučević (9) | Elfrid Payton (11) | Amway Center; 16,032 | 10–19 |
| 30 | December 21 | Philadelphia | L 88–96 | Victor Oladipo (23) | Nikola Vučević (17) | Elfrid Payton (6) | Amway Center; 15,682 | 10–20 |
| 31 | December 23 | Boston | W 100–95 | Tobias Harris (19) | Kyle O'Quinn (13) | Elfrid Payton (7) | Amway Center; 17,489 | 11–20 |
| 32 | December 26 | Cleveland | L 89–98 | Tobias Harris (16) | Nikola Vučević (8) | Victor Oladipo (8) | Amway Center; 18,846 | 11–21 |
| 33 | December 27 | @ Charlotte | W 102–94 | Nikola Vučević (22) | Nikola Vučević (11) | Elfrid Payton (8) | Time Warner Cable Arena; 19,085 | 12–21 |
| 34 | December 29 | @ Miami | W 102–101 | Nikola Vučević (26) | Nikola Vučević (9) | Elfrid Payton (8) | American Airlines Arena; 19,887 | 13–21 |
| 35 | December 30 | Detroit | L 86–109 | Victor Oladipo (16) | Dewayne Dedmon (10) | Elfrid Payton (6) | Amway Center; 17,414 | 13–22 |

January : 2–13 (home: 1–7; road: 1–6)

| Game | Date | Team | Score | High points | High rebounds | High assists | Location Attendance | Record |
|---|---|---|---|---|---|---|---|---|
| 36 | January 2 | Brooklyn | L 98–100 | Victor Oladipo (17) | Elfrid Payton (9) | Elfrid Payton (10) | Amway Center; 17,008 | 13–23 |
| 37 | January 3 | Charlotte | L 90–98 | Victor Oladipo (21) | Tobias Harris (11) | Elfrid Payton (7) | Amway Center; 15,274 | 13–24 |
| 38 | January 7 | @ Denver | L 90–93 | Nikola Vučević (20) | Nikola Vučević (11) | Oladipo, Payton (6) | Pepsi Center; 13,513 | 13–25 |
| 39 | January 9 | @ L.A. Lakers | L 84–101 | Victor Oladipo (17) | Nikola Vučević (11) | Frye, Harris, O'Quinn, Oladipo (3) | Staples Center; 18,997 | 13–26 |
| 40 | January 10 | @ Portland | L 92–103 | Nikola Vučević (36) | Nikola Vučević (16) | Oladipo, Payton, Ridnour (4) | Moda Center; 19,546 | 13–27 |
| 41 | January 12 | @ Chicago | W 121–114 | Oladipo, Vučević (33) | Nikola Vučević (11) | Elfrid Payton (7) | United Center; 21,302 | 14–27 |
| 42 | January 14 | Houston | W 120–113 | Victor Oladipo (32) | Nikola Vučević (12) | Victor Oladipo (6) | Amway Center; 16,828 | 15–27 |
| 43 | January 16 | Memphis | L 96–106 | Elfrid Payton (22) | Nikola Vučević (9) | Elfrid Payton (12) | Amway Center; 18,141 | 15–28 |
| 44 | January 18 | Oklahoma City | L 99–127 | Victor Oladipo (23) | Nikola Vučević (7) | Elfrid Payton (8) | Amway Center; 16,128 | 15–29 |
| 45 | January 21 | @ Detroit | L 118–128 | Nikola Vučević (26) | Nikola Vučević (15) | Elfrid Payton (8) | The Palace of Auburn Hills; 12,148 | 15–30 |
| 46 | January 23 | @ New York | L 106–113 | Nikola Vučević (34) | Nikola Vučević (18) | Elfrid Payton (11) | Madison Square Garden; 19,812 | 15–31 |
| 47 | January 25 | Indiana | L 99–106 | Nikola Vučević (27) | Nikola Vučević (7) | Elfrid Payton (8) | Amway Center; 16,704 | 15–32 |
| 48 | January 26 | @ Memphis | L 94–103 | Oladipo, Vučević (18) | Nikola Vučević (12) | Elfrid Payton (6) | FedExForum; 15,407 | 15–33 |
| 49 | January 29 | Milwaukee | L 100–115 | Victor Oladipo (21) | Nikola Vučević (14) | Elfrid Payton (6) | Amway Center; 16,071 | 15–34 |
| 50 | January 31 | Dallas | L 93–108 | Nikola Vučević (15) | Nikola Vučević (13) | Payton, Harris (6) | Amway Center; 17,626 | 15–35 |

February : 4–6 (home: 4–2; road: 0–4)

| Game | Date | Team | Score | High points | High rebounds | High assists | Location Attendance | Record |
|---|---|---|---|---|---|---|---|---|
| 51 | February 2 | @ Oklahoma City | L 97–104 | Victor Oladipo (22) | Gordon, O'Quinn (8) | Oladipo, Harris (4) | Chesapeake Energy Arena; 18,203 | 15–36 |
| 52 | February 4 | @ San Antonio | L 103–110 | Nikola Vučević (25) | Nikola Vučević (13) | Elfrid Payton (9) | AT&T Center; 18,581 | 15–37 |
| 53 | February 6 | L.A. Lakers | W 103–97 (OT) | Tobias Harris (34) | Nikola Vučević (13) | Elfrid Payton (6) | Amway Center; 16,206 | 16–37 |
| 54 | February 8 | Chicago | L 97–98 | Victor Oladipo (18) | Elfrid Payton (9) | Victor Oladipo (6) | Amway Center; 16,944 | 16–38 |
| 55 | February 9 | @ Washington | L 80–96 | Evan Fournier (18) | Nikola Vučević (8) | Elfrid Payton (6) | Verizon Center; 16,031 | 16–39 |
| 56 | February 11 | New York | W 89–83 | Nikola Vučević (28) | Nikola Vučević (18) | Payton, Oladipo (4) | Amway Center; 15,473 | 17–39 |
All-Star Break
| 57 | February 20 | New Orleans | W 95–84 | Victor Oladipo (22) | Nikola Vučević (13) | Payton, Oladipo (11) | Amway Center; 18,259 | 18–39 |
| 58 | February 22 | Philadelphia | W 103–98 | Nikola Vučević (31) | Nikola Vučević (14) | Elfrid Payton (7) | Amway Center; 16,108 | 19–39 |
| 59 | February 25 | Miami | L 90–93 (OT) | Nikola Vučević (26) | Victor Oladipo (13) | Elfrid Payton (9) | Amway Center; 18,309 | 19–40 |
| 60 | February 27 | @ Atlanta | L 88–95 | Nikola Vučević (21) | Nikola Vučević (15) | Victor Oladipo (6) | Philips Arena; 18,968 | 19–41 |

March : 3–11 (home: 3–6; road: 0–5)

| Game | Date | Team | Score | High points | High rebounds | High assists | Location Attendance | Record |
|---|---|---|---|---|---|---|---|---|
| 61 | March 1 | Charlotte | L 83–98 | Victor Oladipo (21) | Vučević, Dedmon, Harris (9) | Victor Oladipo (5) | Amway Center; 15,422 | 19–42 |
| 62 | March 4 | Phoenix | L 100–105 | Victor Oladipo (38) | Dewayne Dedmon (8) | Elfrid Payton (10) | Amway Center; 15,822 | 19–43 |
| 63 | March 6 | Sacramento | W 119–114 | Victor Oladipo (32) | Channing Frye (10) | Elfrid Payton (12) | Amway Center; 15,112 | 20–43 |
| 64 | March 8 | Boston | W 103–98 | Victor Oladipo (22) | Dewayne Dedmon (16) | Elfrid Payton (7) | Amway Center; 17,041 | 21–43 |
| 65 | March 10 | @ Indiana | L 86–118 | Tobias Harris (22) | Dewayne Dedmon (8) | Elfrid Payton (6) | Bankers Life Fieldhouse; 17,295 | 21–44 |
| 66 | March 11 | @ Milwaukee | L 91–97 | Nikola Vučević (19) | Nikola Vučević (14) | Victor Oladipo (6) | BMO Harris Bradley Center; 12,593 | 21–45 |
| 67 | March 13 | @ Boston | L 88–95 | Elfrid Payton (20) | Nikola Vučević (11) | Elfrid Payton (9) | TD Garden; 18,624 | 21–46 |
| 68 | March 15 | Cleveland | L 108–123 | Victor Oladipo (25) | Nikola Vučević (15) | Elfrid Payton (10) | Amway Center; 17,786 | 21–47 |
| 69 | March 17 | @ Houston | L 94–107 | Victor Oladipo (29) | Nikola Vučević (15) | Elfrid Payton (7) | Toyota Center; 18,235 | 21–48 |
| 70 | March 18 | @ Dallas | L 102–107 | Victor Oladipo (19) | Elfrid Payton (12) | Elfrid Payton (10) | American Airlines Center; 20,294 | 21–49 |
| 71 | March 20 | Portland | W 111–104 | Oladipo, Payton, Vučević (22) | Elfrid Payton (10) | Elfrid Payton (10) | Amway Center; 16,203 | 22–49 |
| 72 | March 22 | Denver | L 100–119 | Victor Oladipo (21) | Payton, Vučević (8) | Elfrid Payton (8) | Amway Center; 15,788 | 22–50 |
| 73 | March 25 | Atlanta | L 83–95 | Elfrid Payton (19) | Nikola Vučević (12) | Elfrid Payton (7) | Amway Center; 17,224 | 22–51 |
| 74 | March 27 | Detroit | L 97–111 | Tobias Harris (21) | Nikola Vučević (14) | Elfrid Payton (13) | Amway Center; 16,427 | 22–52 |

April : 3–5 (home: 1–3; road: 2–2)

| Game | Date | Team | Score | High points | High rebounds | High assists | Location Attendance | Record |
|---|---|---|---|---|---|---|---|---|
| 75 | April 1 | San Antonio | L 91–103 | Victor Oladipo (24) | Nikola Vučević (11) | Oladipo, Payton (7) | Amway Center; 17,229 | 22–53 |
| 76 | April 3 | @ Minnesota | W 97–84 | Nikola Vučević (37) | Nikola Vučević (17) | Elfrid Payton (13) | Target Center; 18,334 | 23–53 |
| 77 | April 4 | @ Milwaukee | W 97–90 | Tobias Harris (23) | Tobias Harris (10) | Elfrid Payton (11) | BMO Harris Bradley Center; 14,090 | 24–53 |
| 78 | April 8 | Chicago | W 105–103 | Victor Oladipo (23) | Dewayne Dedmon (11) | Elfrid Payton (9) | Amway Center; 18,249 | 25–53 |
| 79 | April 10 | Toronto | L 99–101 | Victor Oladipo (19) | Tobias Harris (7) | Elfrid Payton (8) | Amway Center; 16,227 | 25–54 |
| 80 | April 11 | New York | L 79–80 | Victor Oladipo (21) | Nikola Vučević (13) | Elfrid Payton (9) | Amway Center; 17,207 | 25–55 |
| 81 | April 13 | @ Miami | L 93–100 | Victor Oladipo (30) | Tobias Harris (12) | Victor Oladipo (4) | American Airlines Arena; 19,600 | 25–56 |
| 82 | April 15 | @ Brooklyn | L 88–101 | Nikola Vučević (26) | Nikola Vučević (11) | Elfrid Payton (6) | Barclays Center; 17,098 | 25–57 |

2014–15 season schedule

== Player statistics ==
=== Ragular season ===
| Player | POS | GP | GS | MP | REB | AST | STL | BLK | PTS | MPG | RPG | APG | SPG | BPG | PPG |
|---|---|---|---|---|---|---|---|---|---|---|---|---|---|---|---|
| Elfrid Payton | PG | 82 | 63 | 2,489 | 349 | 533 | 142 | 20 | 731 | 30.4 | 4.3 | 6.5 | 1.7 | .2 | 8.9 |
| Channing Frye | PF | 75 | 51 | 1,870 | 293 | 94 | 47 | 39 | 549 | 24.9 | 3.9 | 1.3 | .6 | .5 | 7.3 |
| Nikola Vučević | C | 74 | 74 | 2,529 | 810 | 147 | 54 | 54 | 1,428 | 34.2 | 10.9 | 2.0 | .7 | .7 | 19.3 |
| Victor Oladipo | SG | 72 | 71 | 2,573 | 302 | 295 | 120 | 19 | 1,292 | 35.7 | 4.2 | 4.1 | 1.7 | .3 | 17.9 |
| Tobias Harris | SF | 68 | 63 | 2,369 | 430 | 124 | 69 | 36 | 1,164 | 34.8 | 6.3 | 1.8 | 1.0 | .5 | 17.1 |
| Dewayne Dedmon | C | 59 | 15 | 845 | 295 | 9 | 16 | 50 | 216 | 14.3 | 5.0 | .2 | .3 | .8 | 3.7 |
| Evan Fournier | SG | 58 | 32 | 1,661 | 153 | 120 | 40 | 2 | 698 | 28.6 | 2.6 | 2.1 | .7 | .0 | 12.0 |
| Ben Gordon | SG | 56 | 0 | 790 | 63 | 50 | 14 | 1 | 349 | 14.1 | 1.1 | .9 | .3 | .0 | 6.2 |
| Willie Green | SG | 52 | 2 | 951 | 79 | 68 | 26 | 5 | 306 | 18.3 | 1.5 | 1.3 | .5 | .1 | 5.9 |
| Kyle O'Quinn | PF | 51 | 17 | 824 | 199 | 59 | 31 | 39 | 294 | 16.2 | 3.9 | 1.2 | .6 | .8 | 5.8 |
| Aaron Gordon | PF | 47 | 8 | 797 | 169 | 33 | 21 | 22 | 243 | 17.0 | 3.6 | .7 | .4 | .5 | 5.2 |
| Luke Ridnour | PG | 47 | 0 | 683 | 68 | 96 | 20 | 4 | 188 | 14.5 | 1.4 | 2.0 | .4 | .1 | 4.0 |
| Maurice Harkless | SF | 45 | 4 | 674 | 106 | 25 | 32 | 9 | 158 | 15.0 | 2.4 | .6 | .7 | .2 | 3.5 |
| Andrew Nicholson | PF | 40 | 3 | 492 | 82 | 22 | 6 | 12 | 194 | 12.3 | 2.1 | .6 | .2 | .3 | 4.9 |
| Devyn Marble | SG | 16 | 7 | 208 | 31 | 17 | 9 | 2 | 37 | 13.0 | 1.9 | 1.1 | .6 | .1 | 2.3 |

== Roster ==
2014–15 Orlando Magic roster
Players

| Pos. | No. | Player | Height | Weight | DOB | From |
|---|---|---|---|---|---|---|
| C | 3 | Dewayne Dedmon | 7 ft 0 in (2.13 m) | 245 lb (111 kg) | 1989-08-12 | USC |
| SG | 10 | Evan Fournier | 6 ft 7 in (2.01 m) | 205 lb (93 kg) | 1992-10-29 | France |
| PF | 8 | Channing Frye | 6 ft 11 in (2.11 m) | 255 lb (116 kg) | 1983-05-17 | Arizona |
| PF | 00 | Aaron Gordon | 6 ft 9 in (2.06 m) | 220 lb (100 kg) | 1995-09-16 | Arizona |
| SG | 7 | Ben Gordon | 6 ft 3 in (1.91 m) | 205 lb (93 kg) | 1983-04-04 | Connecticut |
| SG | 34 | Willie Green | 6 ft 3 in (1.91 m) | 205 lb (93 kg) | 1981-07-28 | Detroit Mercy |
| SF | 21 | Maurice Harkless | 6 ft 9 in (2.06 m) | 215 lb (98 kg) | 1993-05-11 | St. John's |
| SF | 12 | Tobias Harris | 6 ft 9 in (2.06 m) | 235 lb (107 kg) | 1992-07-15 | Tennessee |
| SG | 11 | Devyn Marble (injured) | 6 ft 6 in (1.98 m) | 200 lb (91 kg) | 1992-09-21 | Iowa |
| PF | 44 | Andrew Nicholson | 6 ft 9 in (2.06 m) | 250 lb (113 kg) | 1989-12-08 | St. Bonaventure |
| PF/C | 2 | Kyle O'Quinn | 6 ft 10 in (2.08 m) | 250 lb (113 kg) | 1990-03-26 | Norfolk State |
| SG | 5 | Victor Oladipo | 6 ft 4 in (1.93 m) | 210 lb (95 kg) | 1992-05-04 | Indiana |
| PG | 4 | Elfrid Payton | 6 ft 4 in (1.93 m) | 185 lb (84 kg) | 1994-02-22 | Louisiana |
| PG | 13 | Luke Ridnour | 6 ft 2 in (1.88 m) | 175 lb (79 kg) | 1981-02-13 | Oregon |
| C | 9 | Nikola Vučević | 7 ft 0 in (2.13 m) | 260 lb (118 kg) | 1990-10-24 | USC |

Coaches
Head coach
- Scott Skiles
Assistant(s)
- Igor Kokoškov
- Jay Hernandez (player development)
- Laron Profit (player development)
- Keon Weise (trainer)

Legend
- (DP) Unsigned draft pick
- (FA) Free agent
- (S) Suspended
- (DL) On assignment to D-League affiliate
- Injured

Roster
Updated: February 17, 2015

== Transactions ==
=== Free agents ===
==== Re-signed ====
| Player | Signed | Contract | Ref. |

==== Additions ====
| Player | Signed | Former team | Ref. |

==== Subtractions ====
| Player | Reason left | Date | New team | Ref. |

== Awards and honors ==
- Elfrid Payton – All-Rookie 1st Team
