= 2014–15 Detroit Pistons season =

NBA team season

- Head coach: Stan Van Gundy
- President: Stan Van Gundy
- General manager: Jeff Bower
- Owner: Tom Gores
- Arena: The Palace of Auburn Hills

Results
- Record: 32–50 (.390)
- Place: Division: 5th (Central); Conference: 12th (Eastern)
- Playoff finish: Did not qualify
- Stats at Basketball Reference

The 2014–15 Detroit Pistons season was the 74th season of the franchise, the 67th in the National Basketball Association (NBA), and the 58th in Detroit.

== Draft picks ==
Round	Pick	Player	Position	Nationality	College/Team
2	38	Spencer Dinwiddie	PG	United States	Colorado

The Pistons entered the draft with one second-round selection. Their first-round selection was conveyed to the Charlotte Hornets after falling outside its top-8 protection in the NBA draft lottery, due to a 2012 Ben Gordon trade when the franchise was still known as the Bobcats, after having been deferred from 2013 when the team missed that year's playoffs to keep its lottery protection.

== Roster ==
2014–15 Detroit Pistons roster
Players

Pos.	No.	Player	Height	Weight	DOB	From
C	50	Joel Anthony	6 ft 9 in (2.06 m)	245 lb (111 kg)	1982-08-09	UNLV
SF	31	Caron Butler	6 ft 7 in (2.01 m)	221 lb (100 kg)	1980-03-13	Connecticut
SG	5	Kentavious Caldwell-Pope	6 ft 5 in (1.96 m)	205 lb (93 kg)	1993-02-18	Georgia
PG	8	Spencer Dinwiddie	6 ft 6 in (1.98 m)	205 lb (93 kg)	1993-04-06	Colorado
C	0	Andre Drummond	6 ft 11 in (2.11 m)	270 lb (122 kg)	1993-08-10	Connecticut
PG	1	Reggie Jackson	6 ft 3 in (1.91 m)	208 lb (94 kg)	1990-04-16	Boston College
PG	7	Brandon Jennings (injured)	6 ft 1 in (1.85 m)	169 lb (77 kg)	1989-09-23	Oak Hill Academy (VA)
PG	9	John Lucas III	5 ft 11 in (1.80 m)	166 lb (75 kg)	1982-11-21	Oklahoma State
SF	35	Cartier Martin	6 ft 7 in (2.01 m)	220 lb (100 kg)	1984-11-20	Kansas State
SG	20	Jodie Meeks	6 ft 4 in (1.93 m)	208 lb (94 kg)	1987-08-21	Kentucky
PF	34	Quincy Miller	6 ft 9 in (2.06 m)	210 lb (95 kg)	1992-11-18	Baylor
PF	10	Greg Monroe	6 ft 11 in (2.11 m)	250 lb (113 kg)	1990-06-04	Georgetown
SF	22	Tayshaun Prince	6 ft 9 in (2.06 m)	215 lb (98 kg)	1980-02-28	Kentucky
PF	43	Anthony Tolliver	6 ft 8 in (2.03 m)	240 lb (109 kg)	1985-06-01	Creighton
SF	3	Shawne Williams	6 ft 9 in (2.06 m)	230 lb (104 kg)	1986-02-16	Memphis

Coaches
Head coach
- Stan Van Gundy
Assistant(s)
- Malik Allen
- Bob Beyer
- Tim Hardaway
- Charles Klask
- Brendan Malone
- Anthony Harvey (strength and conditioning)
- Jon Ishop (trainer)

Legend
- (DP) Unsigned draft pick
- (FA) Free agent
- (S) Suspended
- (DL) On assignment to D-League affiliate
- Injured

Roster
Updated: March 26, 2015

== Standings ==
=== Central Division ===
Central Division	W	L	PCT	GB	Home	Road	Div	GP
y-Cleveland Cavaliers	53	29	.646	–	31‍–‍10	22‍–‍19	11–5	82
x-Chicago Bulls	50	32	.610	3.0	27‍–‍14	23‍–‍18	8–8	82
x-Milwaukee Bucks	41	41	.500	12.0	23‍–‍18	18‍–‍23	7–9	82
Indiana Pacers	38	44	.463	15.0	23‍–‍18	15‍–‍26	8–8	82
Detroit Pistons	32	50	.390	21.0	18‍–‍23	14‍–‍27	6–10	82

=== Eastern Conference ===
Eastern Conference
#	Team	W	L	PCT	GB	GP
1	c-Atlanta Hawks *	60	22	.732	–	82
2	y-Cleveland Cavaliers *	53	29	.646	7.0	82
3	x-Chicago Bulls	50	32	.610	10.0	82
4	y-Toronto Raptors *	49	33	.598	11.0	82
5	x-Washington Wizards	46	36	.561	14.0	82
6	x-Milwaukee Bucks	41	41	.500	19.0	82
7	x-Boston Celtics	40	42	.488	20.0	82
8	x-Brooklyn Nets	38	44	.463	22.0	82
9	Indiana Pacers	38	44	.463	22.0	82
10	Miami Heat	37	45	.451	23.0	82
11	Charlotte Hornets	33	49	.402	27.0	82
12	Detroit Pistons	32	50	.390	28.0	82
13	Orlando Magic	25	57	.305	35.0	82
14	Philadelphia 76ers	18	64	.220	42.0	82
15	New York Knicks	17	65	.207	43.0	82

== Pre-season ==
2014 pre-season game log
Total: 5–2 (Home: 3–0; Road: 2–2)
Pre-season: 5–2 (home: 3–0; road: 2–2)

Game	Date	Team	Score	High points	High rebounds	High assists	Location Attendance	Record
1	October 7	Chicago	W 111–109 (OT)	Greg Monroe (24)	Greg Monroe (9)	Brandon Jennings (10)	Palace of Auburn Hills; 11,081	1–0
2	October 9	Milwaukee	W 94–80	Kentavious Caldwell-Pope (20)	Andre Drummond (16)	D. J. Augustin (7)	Palace of Auburn Hills; 8,472	2–0
3	October 12	@ Washington	L 89–91	Andre Drummond (21)	Greg Monroe (10)	Augustin & Jennings (7)	Verizon Center; 11,415	2–1
4	October 15	@ Charlotte	W 104–84	D. J. Augustin (16)	Greg Monroe (14)	Brandon Jennings (9)	Time Warner Cable Arena; 19,081	3–1
5	October 17	@ Orlando	L 87–99	Greg Monroe (24)	Greg Monroe (10)	Josh Smith (7)	Amway Center; 14,707	3–2
6	October 18	@ Atlanta	W 104–100	Andre Drummond (19)	Andre Drummond (17)	Brandon Jennings (11)	Philips Arena; 10,560	4–2
7	October 23	Philadelphia	W 109–103	Caron Butler (18)	Andre Drummond (11)	D. J. Augustin (11)	Palace of Auburn Hills; 11,666	5–2

2014–15 season schedule

== Regular season ==
=== Game log ===
2014–15 game log
Total: 32–50 (Home: 18–23; Road: 14–27)
October: 0–2 (home: 0–0; road: 0–2)

Game	Date	Team	Score	High points	High rebounds	High assists	Location Attendance	Record
1	October 29	@ Denver	L 79–89	Josh Smith (25)	Andre Drummond (9)	Smith, Caldwell-Pope & Augustin (3)	Pepsi Center; 17,136	0–1
2	October 30	@ Minnesota	L 91–97	Caron Butler (24)	Andre Drummond (12)	D. J. Augustin (6)	Target Center; 18,296	0–2

November : 3–12 (home: 2–7; road: 1–5)

Game	Date	Team	Score	High points	High rebounds	High assists	Location Attendance	Record
3	November 1	Brooklyn	L 90–102	Monroe & Butler (18)	Greg Monroe (11)	Brandon Jennings (9)	Palace of Auburn Hills; 19,904	0–3
4	November 5	New York	W 98–95	Greg Monroe (23)	Greg Monroe (18)	Smith & Jennings (5)	Palace of Auburn Hills; 11,915	1–3
5	November 7	Milwaukee	W 98–95	Kentavious Caldwell-Pope (19)	Andre Drummond (10)	Brandon Jennings (6)	Palace of Auburn Hills; 16,102	2–3
6	November 9	Utah	L 96–97	Brandon Jennings (23)	Andre Drummond (18)	Brandon Jennings (5)	Palace of Auburn Hills; 12,888	2–4
7	November 10	@ Chicago	L 91–102	Josh Smith (19)	Andre Drummond (12)	Brandon Jennings (8)	United Center; 21,431	2–5
8	November 12	@ Washington	L 103–107	Brandon Jennings (32)	Smith & Monroe (9)	Brandon Jennings (10)	Verizon Center; 14,708	2–6
9	November 14	@ Oklahoma City	W 96–89 (OT)	Brandon Jennings (29)	Andre Drummond (15)	Monroe, Jennings & Augustin (5)	Chesapeake Energy Arena; 18,203	3–6
10	November 15	@ Memphis	L 88–95	Kyle Singler (21)	Greg Monroe (11)	D. J. Augustin (5)	FedExForum; 17,215	3–7
11	November 17	Orlando	L 93–107	Caron Butler (20)	Andre Drummond (10)	Brandon Jennings (6)	Palace of Auburn Hills; 11,619	3–8
12	November 19	Phoenix	L 86–88	Brandon Jennings (19)	Andre Drummond (13)	Brandon Jennings (7)	Palace of Auburn Hills; 10,686	3–9
13	November 21	@ Atlanta	L 89–99	Josh Smith (16)	Andre Drummond (16)	Josh Smith (5)	Philips Arena; 16,517	3–10
14	November 25	@ Milwaukee	L 86–98	Andre Drummond (23)	Smith & Drummond (10)	Josh Smith (8)	BMO Harris Bradley Center; 15,265	3–11
15	November 26	L.A. Clippers	L 98–104	D. J. Augustin (19)	Andre Drummond (13)	Smith & Augustin (6)	Palace of Auburn Hills; 13,461	3–12
16	November 28	Milwaukee	L 88–104	Andre Drummond (26)	Andre Drummond (20)	Josh Smith (9)	Palace of Auburn Hills; 13,127	3–13
17	November 30	Golden State	L 93–104	Kentavious Caldwell-Pope (23)	Greg Monroe (10)	Josh Smith (12)	Palace of Auburn Hills; 12,737	3–14

December : 5–9 (home: 1–6; road: 4–3)

Game	Date	Team	Score	High points	High rebounds	High assists	Location Attendance	Record
18	December 2	L.A. Lakers	L 96–106	Josh Smith (18)	Andre Drummond (13)	Josh Smith (6)	Palace of Auburn Hills; 14,083	3–15
19	December 3	@ Boston	L 102–109 (OT)	Greg Monroe (29)	Andre Drummond (14)	Brandon Jennings (12)	TD Garden; 15,870	3–16
20	December 6	Philadelphia	L 101–108 (OT)	Josh Smith (23)	Greg Monroe (9)	Josh Smith (7)	Palace of Auburn Hills; 16,514	3–17
21	December 7	Oklahoma City	L 94–96	Kentavious Caldwell-Pope (19)	Andre Drummond (9)	Brandon Jennings (9)	Palace of Auburn Hills; 13,090	3–18
22	December 9	Portland	L 86–98	Greg Monroe (22)	Andre Drummond (15)	Jennings & Augustin (6)	Palace of Auburn Hills; 12,813	3–19
23	December 12	@ Phoenix	W 105–102	Andre Drummond (23)	Andre Drummond (14)	D. J. Augustin (6)	US Airways Center; 17,007	4–19
24	December 13	@ Sacramento	W 95–90	Greg Monroe (24)	Josh Smith (13)	Brandon Jennings (8)	Sleep Train Arena; 16,242	5–19
25	December 15	@ L.A. Clippers	L 91–113	Jodie Meeks (20)	Andre Drummond (13)	Brandon Jennings (6)	Staples Center; 19,060	5–20
26	December 17	Dallas	L 106–117	Andre Drummond (19)	Andre Drummond (24)	Brandon Jennings (7)	Palace of Auburn Hills; 12,287	5–21
27	December 19	Toronto	L 100–110	Brandon Jennings (22)	Andre Drummond (11)	Brandon Jennings (8)	Palace of Auburn Hills; 16,274	5–22
28	December 21	@ Brooklyn	L 105–110	Kentavious Caldwell-Pope (20)	Andre Drummond (20)	Brandon Jennings (9)	Barclays Center; 17,732	5–23
29	December 26	Indiana	W 119–109	Andre Drummond (20)	Greg Monroe (15)	Brandon Jennings (10)	Palace of Auburn Hills; 13,408	6–23
30	December 28	@ Cleveland	W 103–80	Brandon Jennings (25)	Andre Drummond (17)	Brandon Jennings (6)	Quicken Loans Arena; 20,562	7–23
31	December 30	@ Orlando	W 109–86	Jodie Meeks (34)	Andre Drummond (22)	D. J. Augustin (10)	Amway Center; 17,414	8–23

January : 10–7 (home: 5–3; road: 5–4)

Game	Date	Team	Score	High points	High rebounds	High assists	Location Attendance	Record
32	January 2	@ New York	W 97–81	Brandon Jennings (29)	Andre Drummond (20)	D. J. Augustin (9)	Madison Square Garden; 19,812	9–23
33	January 4	Sacramento	W 114–95	Brandon Jennings (35)	Andre Drummond (14)	Brandon Jennings (7)	Palace of Auburn Hills; 12,254	10–23
34	January 6	@ San Antonio	W 105–104	Andre Drummond (20)	Andre Drummond (17)	Brandon Jennings (7)	AT&T Center; 18,581	11–23
35	January 7	@ Dallas	W 108–95	Greg Monroe (27)	Andre Drummond (19)	Monroe & Jennings (6)	American Airlines Center; 20,279	12–23
36	January 9	Atlanta	L 103–106	Kentavious Caldwell-Pope (20)	Greg Monroe (12)	Brandon Jennings (8)	Palace of Auburn Hills; 18,859	12–24
37	January 10	Brooklyn	W 98–93	Brandon Jennings (20)	Greg Monroe (17)	Brandon Jennings (11)	Palace of Auburn Hills; 19,301	13–24
38	January 12	@ Toronto	W 114–111	Brandon Jennings (34)	Andre Drummond (14)	Brandon Jennings (10)	Air Canada Centre; 19,800	14–24
39	January 14	New Orleans	L 94–105	Brandon Jennings (19)	Greg Monroe (8)	Greg Monroe (5)	Palace of Auburn Hills; 12,016	14–25
40	January 16	@ Indiana	W 98–96	Brandon Jennings (37)	Andre Drummond (16)	Brandon Jennings (2)	Bankers Life Fieldhouse; 17,558	15–25
41	January 17	Philadelphia	W 107–89	Kyle Singler (20)	Andre Drummond (15)	D. J. Augustin (10)	Palace of Auburn Hills; 15,496	16–25
42	January 19	@ Atlanta	L 82–93	Greg Monroe (16)	Greg Monroe (20)	Brandon Jennings (5)	Philips Arena; 19,108	16–26
43	January 21	Orlando	W 128–118	Andre Drummond (26)	Andre Drummond (16)	Brandon Jennings (21)	Palace of Auburn Hills; 12,148	17–26
44	January 24	@ Milwaukee	L 86–101	Brandon Jennings (16)	Greg Monroe (16)	Brandon Jennings (4)	BMO Harris Bradley Center; 16,388	17–27
45	January 25	@ Toronto	L 110–114	D. J. Augustin (35)	Greg Monroe (16)	D. J. Augustin (8)	Air Canada Centre; 19,800	17–28
46	January 27	Cleveland	L 95–103	D. J. Augustin (19)	Andre Drummond (17)	D. J. Augustin (9)	Palace of Auburn Hills; 18,178	17–29
47	January 28	@ Philadelphia	L 69–89	Greg Monroe (20)	Greg Monroe (11)	D. J. Augustin (4)	Wells Fargo Center; 11,213	17–30
48	January 31	Houston	W 114–101	Caldwell-Pope & Augustin (28)	Andre Drummond (16)	D. J. Augustin (12)	Palace of Auburn Hills; 18,213	18–30

February : 5–6 (home: 4–4; road: 1–2)

Game	Date	Team	Score	High points	High rebounds	High assists	Location Attendance	Record
49	February 3	Miami	W 108–91	D. J. Augustin (25)	Andre Drummond (14)	D. J. Augustin (13)	Palace of Auburn Hills; 12,768	19–30
50	February 4	@ Indiana	L 109–114	Andre Drummond (18)	Andre Drummond (16)	D. J. Augustin (6)	Bankers Life Fieldhouse; 15,892	19–31
51	February 6	Denver	W 98–88	D. J. Augustin (22)	Greg Monroe (21)	D. J. Augustin (11)	Palace of Auburn Hills; 17,035	20–31
52	February 8	Minnesota	L 101–112	D. J. Augustin (20)	Andre Drummond (14)	D. J. Augustin (8)	Palace of Auburn Hills; 16,075	20–32
53	February 10	@ Charlotte	W 106–78	Greg Monroe (23)	Greg Monroe (12)	D. J. Augustin (5)	Time Warner Cable Arena; 15,876	21–32
54	February 11	San Antonio	L 87–104	D. J. Augustin (22)	Andre Drummond (9)	Augustin & Lucas (6)	Palace of Auburn Hills; 14,617	21–33
All-Star Break
55	February 20	Chicago	W 100–91	Butler & Monroe (20)	Andre Drummond (20)	Spencer Dinwiddie (9)	Palace of Auburn Hills; 19,053	22–33
56	February 22	Washington	W 106–89	Kentavious Caldwell-Pope (26)	Andre Drummond (16)	Spencer Dinwiddie (7)	Palace of Auburn Hills; 18,371	23–33
57	February 24	Cleveland	L 93–102	Reggie Jackson (22)	Greg Monroe (14)	Reggie Jackson (9)	Palace of Auburn Hills; 19,087	23–34
58	February 27	New York	L 115–121 (2OT)	Greg Monroe (28)	Andre Drummond (15)	Jackson & Lucas (5)	Palace of Auburn Hills; 16,182	23–35
59	February 28	@ Washington	L 95–99	Greg Monroe (21)	Greg Monroe (10)	Spencer Dinwiddie (8)	Verizon Center; 20,356	23–36

March : 6–9 (home: 4–1; road: 2–8)

Game	Date	Team	Score	High points	High rebounds	High assists	Location Attendance	Record
60	March 4	@ New Orleans	L 85–88	Jodie Meeks (20)	Andre Drummond (18)	Reggie Jackson (11)	New Orleans Arena; 16,925	23–37
61	March 6	@ Houston	L 93–103	Greg Monroe (19)	Andre Drummond (21)	Reggie Jackson (7)	Toyota Center; 18,193	23–38
62	March 8	Charlotte	L 101–108	Reggie Jackson (25)	Greg Monroe (11)	Reggie Jackson (7)	Palace of Auburn Hills; 15,673	23–39
63	March 10	@ L.A. Lakers	L 85–93	Greg Monroe (24)	Andre Drummond (21)	Spencer Dinwiddie (6)	Staples Center; 17,771	23–40
64	March 11	@ Golden State	L 98–105	Andre Drummond (22)	Andre Drummond (27)	Reggie Jackson (9)	Oracle Arena; 19,596	23–41
65	March 13	@ Portland	L 99–118	Greg Monroe (19)	Andre Drummond (17)	Reggie Jackson (10)	Moda Center; 19,486	23–42
66	March 14	@ Utah	L 85–88	Greg Monroe (16)	Greg Monroe (13)	Spencer Dinwiddie (6)	EnergySolutions Arena; 19,911	23–43
67	March 17	Memphis	W 105–95	Kentavious Caldwell-Pope (24)	Andre Drummond (16)	Reggie Jackson (20)	Palace of Auburn Hills; 14,399	24–43
68	March 18	@ Philadelphia	L 83–94	Kentavious Caldwell-Pope (20)	Andre Drummond (14)	Reggie Jackson (10)	Wells Fargo Center; 10,776	24–44
69	March 21	Chicago	W 107–91	Reggie Jackson (22)	Tayshaun Prince (10)	Reggie Jackson (11)	Palace of Auburn Hills; 20,347	25–44
70	March 22	@ Boston	W 105–97 (OT)	Kentavious Caldwell-Pope (27)	Andre Drummond (22)	Reggie Jackson (11)	TD Garden; 18,624	26–44
71	March 24	Toronto	W 108–104	Reggie Jackson (28)	Andre Drummond (18)	Reggie Jackson (9)	Palace of Auburn Hills; 14,420	27–44
72	March 27	@ Orlando	W 111–97	Reggie Jackson (26)	Reggie Jackson (11)	Reggie Jackson (10)	Amway Center; 16,427	28–44
73	March 29	@ Miami	L 102–109	Andre Drummond (32)	Andre Drummond (14)	Reggie Jackson (9)	American Airlines Arena; 19,685	28–45
74	March 31	Atlanta	W 105–95	Andre Drummond (22)	Andre Drummond (13)	Reggie Jackson (11)	Palace of Auburn Hills; 14,242	29–45

April : 3–5 (home: 2–2; road: 1–3)

Game	Date	Team	Score	High points	High rebounds	High assists	Location Attendance	Record
75	April 1	@ Charlotte	L 78–102	Jodie Meeks (15)	Andre Drummond (9)	Reggie Jackson (8)	Time Warner Cable Arena; 15,372	29–46
76	April 3	@ Chicago	L 82–88	Reggie Jackson (22)	Andre Drummond (22)	Reggie Jackson (9)	United Center; 22,058	29–47
77	April 4	Miami	W 99–98	Reggie Jackson (29)	Andre Drummond (17)	Reggie Jackson (11)	Palace of Auburn Hills; 16,133	30–47
78	April 8	Boston	L 103–113	Andre Drummond (22)	Andre Drummond (14)	Reggie Jackson (15)	Palace of Auburn Hills; 14,284	30–48
79	April 10	Indiana	L 103–107	Reggie Jackson (21)	Andre Drummond (15)	Reggie Jackson (9)	Palace of Auburn Hills; 18,561	30–49
80	April 12	Charlotte	W 116–77	Jodie Meeks (24)	Andre Drummond (19)	Reggie Jackson (13)	Palace of Auburn Hills; 17,297	31–49
81	April 13	@ Cleveland	L 97–109	Andre Drummond (20)	Andre Drummond (9)	Reggie Jackson (8)	Quicken Loans Arena; 20,562	31–50
82	April 15	@ New York	W 112–90	Reggie Jackson (24)	Andre Drummond (12)	Reggie Jackson (11)	Madison Square Garden; 19,812	32–50

2014–15 season schedule

== Player statistics ==
Legend
GP	Games played	GS	Games started	MPG	Minutes per game
FG%	Field-goal percentage	3P%	3-point field-goal percentage	FT%	Free-throw percentage
RPG	Rebounds per game	APG	Assists per game	SPG	Steals per game
BPG	Blocks per game	PPG	Points per game

=== Season ===
Player	GP	GS	MPG	FG%	3P%	FT%	RPG	APG	SPG	BPG	PPG
Reggie Jackson	27	27	32.2	.436	.337	.800	7.7	9.2	.74	.15	17.6
Greg Monroe	69	57	31.0	.496	.000	.750	10.2	2.1	1.13	.49	15.9
Brandon Jennings	41	41	28.6	.401	.360	.839	2.5	6.6	1.07	.10	15.4
Andre Drummond	82	82	30.5	.514	.000	.389	13.5	.7	.89	1.87	13.8
Josh Smith	28	28	32.0	.391	.243	.470	7.2	4.7	1.32	1.71	13.1
Kentavious Caldwell-Pope	82	82	31.5	.401	.345	.696	3.1	1.3	1.13	.22	12.7
Jodie Meeks	60	0	24.4	.416	.349	.906	1.7	1.3	.98	.10	11.1
D. J. Augustin	54	13	23.8	.410	.327	.870	1.9	4.9	.61	.04	10.6
Anthony Tolliver	52	11	22.3	.423	.360	.783	3.7	.9	.38	.29	7.7
Tayshaun Prince	23	7	24.8	.431	.423	.754	4.2	1.7	.65	.35	7.3
Kyle Singler	54	40	23.8	.400	.406	.810	2.6	1.2	.61	.26	7.1
Caron Butler	78	21	20.8	.407	.379	.902	2.5	1.0	.55	.05	5.9
Jonas Jerebko	46	0	15.3	.460	.368	.860	3.1	.9	.59	.24	5.2
John Lucas III	21	0	13.0	.404	.310	1.000	.08	2.9	.38	.00	4.7
Spencer Dinwiddie	34	1	13.4	.302	.185	.912	1.4	3.1	.56	.18	4.3
Luigi Datome	3	0	5.7	.417	.250	.000	1.3	.7	.33	.00	3.7
Quincy Miller	4	0	14.5	.250	.182	.727	2.0	1.3	.25	.50	3.0
Shawne Williams	19	0	8.6	.317	.154	.875	1.4	.4	.21	.21	2.6
Joel Anthony	49	0	8.3	.581	.000	.682	1.9	.1	.24	1.00	1.8
Cartier Martin	23	0	8.6	.283	.182	.182	.9	.5	.13	.04	1.6

== Transactions ==
=== Overview ===
Players Added

Via draft

- Spencer Dinwiddie

Via trade

- Joel Anthony
- Reggie Jackson
- Tayshaun Prince
- Anthony Tolliver

Via free agency

- Jodie Meeks
- D. J. Augustin
- Caron Butler
Players Lost

Via trade

- D. J. Augustin
- Will Bynum
- Luigi Datome
- Jonas Jerebko
- Tony Mitchell
- Kyle Singler

Via free agency

- Rodney Stuckey

Waived

- Josh Harrellson
- Peyton Siva
- Josh Smith

=== Trades ===
October 17, 2014	To Detroit Pistons Joel Anthony	To Boston Celtics Will Bynum
December 24, 2014	To Detroit Pistons Anthony Tolliver	To Phoenix Suns Tony Mitchell
February 19, 2015	To Detroit Pistons Tayshaun Prince	To Boston Celtics Jonas Jerebko; Luigi Datome
February 19, 2015	Three-team trade
February 19, 2015	To Utah Jazz Kendrick Perkins (from Oklahoma City) Grant Jerrett (from Oklahoma City) Rights to Tibor Pleiß (from Oklahoma City) 2018 first-round pick (from Oklahoma City) 2017 second-round pick (from Detroit)	To Oklahoma City Thunder Enes Kanter (from Utah); Steve Novak (from Utah) D. J. Augustin (from Detroit) Kyle Singler (from Detroit) 2019 second-round pick (from Detroit)
February 19, 2015	To Detroit Pistons Reggie Jackson (from Oklahoma City)

=== Players added ===
Date	Player	Former team	Contract terms	Ref
July 14	Jodie Meeks	Los Angeles Lakers	3-years, $19.5 million	
July 15	D. J. Augustin	Chicago Bulls	2-years, $6 million	
July 15	Caron Butler	Oklahoma City Thunder	2-years, $9 million	

=== Players lost ===
Date	Player	Reason left	New team	Contract terms	Ref
July 15	Josh Harrellson	waived	Chongqing Flying Dragons (CBA)	n/a	
July 15	Peyton Siva	waived	Orlando Magic	n/a	
July 21	Rodney Stuckey	free agency	Indiana Pacers	1-year, $1,227,985	
December 22	Josh Smith	waived	Houston Rockets	1-year, $2,077,000	
