= 2014–15 Memphis Grizzlies season =

- Head coach: Dave Joerger
- General manager: Chris Wallace
- Owners: Robert Pera
- Arena: FedExForum

Results
- Record: 55–27 (.671)
- Place: Division: 2nd (Southwest); Conference: 5th (Western)
- Playoff finish: Conference Semifinals (lost to Warriors 2–4)
- Stats at Basketball Reference

Local media
- Television: Fox Sports Tennessee; Fox Sports Southeast
- Radio: WMFS-FM

The 2014–15 Memphis Grizzlies season was the 20th season of the franchise in the NBA and their 14th in Memphis.

The Grizzlies opened the season with a franchise-best 6–0 start, a feat that they later tied in 2026–27. They were strong for most of the season, and led the Southwest Division for most of the season, but faltered during the month of April and surrendered the division lead to the Rockets. The Grizzlies finished second in the Southwest Division with the second best record in franchise history at 55–27 and fifth in the Western Conference.

In the first round, they defeated the Portland Trail Blazers in five games. The Grizzlies' season ended with a 2–4 Semifinals loss to eventual NBA champion Golden State Warriors.

== Preseason ==
=== Draft picks ===
Round	Pick	Player	Position	Nationality	School
1	22	Jordan Adams	SG	United States	UCLA

== Regular season ==
=== Standings ===
Southwest Division	W	L	PCT	GB	Home	Road	Div	GP
y-Houston Rockets	56	26	.683	–	30‍–‍11	26‍–‍15	8–8	82
x-Memphis Grizzlies	55	27	.671	1.0	31‍–‍10	24‍–‍17	9–7	82
x-San Antonio Spurs	55	27	.671	1.0	33‍–‍8	22‍–‍19	8–8	82
x-Dallas Mavericks	50	32	.610	6.0	27‍–‍14	23‍–‍18	7–9	82
x-New Orleans Pelicans	45	37	.549	11.0	28‍–‍13	17‍–‍24	8–8	82

Western Conference
#	Team	W	L	PCT	GB	GP
1	z-Golden State Warriors *	67	15	.817	–	82
2	y-Houston Rockets *	56	26	.683	11.0	82
3	x-Los Angeles Clippers	56	26	.683	11.0	82
4	y-Portland Trail Blazers *	51	31	.622	16.0	82
5	x-Memphis Grizzlies	55	27	.671	12.0	82
6	x-San Antonio Spurs	55	27	.671	12.0	82
7	x-Dallas Mavericks	50	32	.610	17.0	82
8	x-New Orleans Pelicans	45	37	.549	22.0	82
9	Oklahoma City Thunder	45	37	.549	22.0	82
10	Phoenix Suns	39	43	.476	28.0	82
11	Utah Jazz	38	44	.463	29.0	82
12	Denver Nuggets	30	52	.366	37.0	82
13	Sacramento Kings	29	53	.354	38.0	82
14	Los Angeles Lakers	21	61	.256	46.0	82
15	Minnesota Timberwolves	16	66	.195	51.0	82

== Game log ==
=== Preseason ===
2014 pre-season game log
Total: 3–5 (home: 3–1; road: 0–4)
Pre-season: 3–5 (home: 3–1; road: 0–4)

Game	Date	Team	Score	High points	High rebounds	High assists	Location Attendance	Record
1	October 8	@ Milwaukee	L 83–86	Jon Leuer (11)	Marc Gasol (7)	Conley, Adams & Udrih (3)	BMO Harris Bradley Center; 4,685	0–1
2	October 9	@ Houston	L 93–113	Jarnell Stokes (12)	Earl Clark (6)	Leuer, Clark, Pondexter & Calathes (3)	Toyota Center; 15,301	0–2
3	October 11	Atlanta	W 93–88	Mike Conley Jr. (23)	Marc Gasol (13)	Zach Randolph (5)	FedExForum; 11,867	1–2
4	October 14	@ Oklahoma City	L 107–117	Quincy Pondexter (16)	Jon Leuer (7)	Jon Leuer (4)	Chesapeake Energy Arena unknown	1–3
5	October 17	Flamengo	W 112–72	Marc Gasol (15)	Zach Randolph (8)	Mike Conley Jr. (7)	FedExForum; 10,969	2–3
6	October 20	@ Dallas	L 103–108	Quincy Pondexter (18)	Gasol & Whiteside (7)	Mike Conley Jr. (4)	American Airlines Center; 16,402	2–4
7	October 22	Cleveland	W 96–92	Marc Gasol (16)	Marc Gasol (9)	Conley & Calathes (4)	FedExForum; 12,073	3–4
8	October 24	Miami	L 98–104	Jon Leuer (21)	Kosta Koufos (8)	Mike Conley Jr. (4)	FedExForum; 10,843	3–5

2014–15 pre-season schedule

=== Regular season ===
2014–15 game log
Total: 55–27 (home: 31–10; road: 24–17)
October: 2–0 (home: 1–0; road: 1–0)

Game	Date	Team	Score	High points	High rebounds	High assists	Location Attendance	Record
1	October 29	Minnesota	W 105–101	Marc Gasol (32)	Zach Randolph (13)	Mike Conley Jr. (6)	FedExForum; 17,731	1–0
2	October 31	@ Indiana	W 97–89	Zach Randolph (22)	Zach Randolph (13)	Mike Conley Jr. (4)	Bankers Life Fieldhouse; 14,441	2–0

November : 13–2 (home: 7–0; road: 6–2)

Game	Date	Team	Score	High points	High rebounds	High assists	Location Attendance	Record
3	November 1	@ Charlotte	W 71–69	Marc Gasol (22)	Zach Randolph (12)	Mike Conley Jr. (7)	Time Warner Cable Arena; 18,133	3–0
4	November 3	New Orleans	W 93–81	Marc Gasol (16)	Randolph, Gasol & Allen (11)	Mike Conley Jr. (5)	FedExForum; 15,302	4–0
5	November 5	@ Phoenix	W 102–91	Mike Conley Jr. (24)	Randolph & Leuer (6)	Mike Conley Jr. (11)	US Airways Center; 15,377	5–0
6	November 7	@ Oklahoma City	W 91–89	Mike Conley Jr. (20)	Marc Gasol (9)	Mike Conley Jr. (5)	Chesapeake Energy Arena; 18,203	6–0
7	November 8	@ Milwaukee	L 92–93	Zach Randolph (22)	Zach Randolph (14)	Mike Conley Jr. (4)	BMO Harris Bradley Center; 13,841	6–1
8	November 11	L.A. Lakers	W 107–102	Mike Conley Jr. (23)	Zach Randolph (10)	Marc Gasol (9)	FedExForum; 17,618	7–1
9	November 13	Sacramento	W 111–110	Mike Conley Jr. (22)	Zach Randolph (8)	Mike Conley Jr. (11)	FedExForum; 15,666	8–1
10	November 15	Detroit	W 95–88	Marc Gasol (23)	Zach Randolph (22)	Randolph & Conley (4)	FedExForum; 17,215	9–1
11	November 17	Houston	W 119–93	Mike Conley Jr. (19)	Zach Randolph (7)	Conley & Udrih (6)	FedExForum; 17,012	10–1
12	November 19	@ Toronto	L 92–96	Marc Gasol (22)	Zach Randolph (18)	Mike Conley Jr. (5)	Air Canada Centre; 19,800	10–2
13	November 21	Boston	W 117–100	Marc Gasol (30)	Zach Randolph (12)	Mike Conley Jr. (7)	FedExForum; 17,712	11–2
14	November 23	L.A. Clippers	W 107–91	Marc Gasol (30)	Marc Gasol (12)	Mike Conley Jr. (8)	FedExForum; 18,119	12–2
15	November 26	@ L.A. Lakers	W 99–93	Conley & Gasol (19)	Marc Gasol (11)	Mike Conley Jr. (7)	Staples Center; 18,997	13–2
16	November 28	@ Portland	W 112–99	Marc Gasol (26)	Zach Randolph (13)	Conley & Gasol (9)	Moda Center; 19,459	14–2
17	November 30	@ Sacramento	W 97–85	Zach Randolph (22)	Zach Randolph (12)	Mike Conley Jr. (6)	Sleep Train Arena; 16,240	15–2

December : 8–6 (home: 5–3; road: 3–3)

Game	Date	Team	Score	High points	High rebounds	High assists	Location Attendance	Record
18	December 3	@ Houston	L 96–105	Mike Conley Jr. (15)	Marc Gasol (7)	Conley & Calathes (6)	Toyota Center; 18,151	15–3
19	December 5	San Antonio	L 101–107	Marc Gasol (28)	Marc Gasol (12)	Mike Conley Jr. (10)	FedExForum; 18,119	15–4
20	December 7	Miami	W 103–87	Jon Leuer (20)	Jon Leuer (12)	Marc Gasol (7)	FedExForum; 16,572	16–4
21	December 9	Dallas	W 114–105	Marc Gasol (30)	Zach Randolph (13)	Marc Gasol (6)	FedExForum; 16,512	17–4
22	December 12	Charlotte	W 113–107 (2OT)	Zach Randolph (20)	Zach Randolph (11)	Conley & Udrih (6)	FedExForum; 15,897	18–4
23	December 13	@ Philadelphia	W 120–115 (OT)	Mike Conley Jr. (36)	Zach Randolph (11)	Mike Conley Jr. (9)	Wells Fargo Center; 13,698	19–4
24	December 16	Golden State	W 105–98	Marc Gasol (24)	Zach Randolph (10)	Beno Udrih (8)	FedExForum; 18,119	20–4
25	December 17	@ San Antonio	W 117–116 (3OT)	Marc Gasol (26)	Zach Randolph (21)	Mike Conley Jr. (10)	AT&T Center; 18,581	21–4
26	December 19	Chicago	L 97–103	Mike Conley Jr. (21)	Zach Randolph (12)	Marc Gasol (3)	FedExForum; 18,119	21–5
27	December 21	@ Cleveland	L 91–105	Marc Gasol (23)	Marc Gasol (11)	Gasol, Conley & Udrih (5)	Quicken Loans Arena; 20,562	21–6
28	December 22	Utah	L 91–97	Mike Conley Jr. (28)	Marc Gasol (12)	Marc Gasol (5)	FedExForum; 16,991	21–7
29	December 26	Houston	L 111–117 (OT)	Marc Gasol (29)	Tayshaun Prince (9)	Mike Conley Jr. (7)	FedExForum; 18,119	21–8
30	December 27	@ Miami	W 103–95	Mike Conley Jr. (24)	Marc Gasol (10)	Tayshaun Prince (5)	American Airlines Arena; 19,744	22–8
31	December 30	San Antonio	W 95–87	Mike Conley Jr. (30)	Marc Gasol (9)	Mike Conley Jr. (6)	FedExForum; 18,119	23–8

January : 12–4 (home: 8–1; road: 4–3)

Game	Date	Team	Score	High points	High rebounds	High assists	Location Attendance	Record
32	January 2	@ L.A. Lakers	W 109–106	Mike Conley Jr. (30)	Marc Gasol (10)	Mike Conley Jr. (9)	Staples Center; 18,997	24–8
33	January 3	@ Denver	L 85–114	Marc Gasol (18)	Kosta Koufos (9)	Conley & Calathes (5)	Pepsi Center; 16,350	24–9
34	January 5	New York	W 105–83	Mike Conley Jr. (22)	Marc Gasol (8)	Mike Conley Jr. (7)	FedExForum; 16,888	25–9
35	January 7	@ Atlanta	L 86–96	Mike Conley Jr. (17)	Mike Conley Jr. (9)	Mike Conley Jr. (6)	Philips Arena; 17,126	25–10
36	January 9	@ New Orleans	L 95–106	Conley & Gasol (19)	Zach Randolph (11)	Mike Conley Jr. (7)	Smoothie King Center; 17,639	25–11
37	January 11	Phoenix	W 122–110 (2OT)	Zach Randolph (27)	Zach Randolph (17)	Mike Conley Jr. (8)	FedExForum; 17,212	26–11
38	January 14	@ Brooklyn	W 103–92	Zach Randolph (20)	Zach Randolph (14)	Randolph, Lee & Calathes (3)	Barclays Center; 16,516	27–11
39	January 16	@ Orlando	W 106–96	Jeff Green (21)	Marc Gasol (16)	Marc Gasol (8)	Amway Center; 18,141	28–11
40	January 17	Portland	W 102–98	Zach Randolph (20)	Zach Randolph (15)	Marc Gasol (6)	FedExForum; 18,119	29–11
41	January 19	Dallas	L 95–103	Mike Conley Jr. (22)	Zach Randolph (15)	Conley & Gasol (4)	FedExForum; 18,119	29–12
42	January 21	Toronto	W 92–86	Marc Gasol (26)	Zach Randolph (13)	Marc Gasol (5)	FedExForum; 15,112	30–12
43	January 24	Philadelphia	W 101–83	Jeff Green (18)	Zach Randolph (14)	Beno Udrih (5)	FedExForum; 17,579	31–12
44	January 26	Orlando	W 103–94	Zach Randolph (24)	Randolph & Gasol (10)	Zach Randolph (6)	FedExForum; 15,407	32–12
45	January 27	@ Dallas	W 109–90	Zach Randolph (22)	Zach Randolph (10)	Marc Gasol (6)	American Airlines Center; 20,160	33–12
46	January 29	Denver	W 99–69	Zach Randolph (15)	Zach Randolph (17)	Nick Calathes (9)	FedExForum; 16,736	34–12
47	January 31	Oklahoma City	W 85–74	Zach Randolph (21)	Zach Randolph (18)	Marc Gasol (5)	FedExForum; 18,119	35–12

February : 6–4 (home: 1–1; road: 5–3)

Game	Date	Team	Score	High points	High rebounds	High assists	Location Attendance	Record
48	February 2	@ Phoenix	W 102–101	Mike Conley Jr. (23)	Kosta Koufos (11)	Marc Gasol (8)	US Airways Center; 17,199	36–12
49	February 4	@ Utah	W 100–90	Marc Gasol (23)	Zach Randolph (11)	Nick Calathes (7)	EnergySolutions Arena; 19,911	37–12
50	February 6	@ Minnesota	L 89–90	Green, Conley & Gasol (15)	Zach Randolph (10)	Mike Conley Jr. (7)	Target Center; 14,388	37–13
51	February 8	Atlanta	W 94–88	Mike Conley Jr. (21)	Zach Randolph (15)	Mike Conley Jr. (6)	FedExForum; 18,119	38–13
52	February 10	Brooklyn	W 95–86	Zach Randolph (19)	Marc Gasol (11)	Conley, Green & Allen (4)	FedExForum; 16,901	39–13
53	February 11	@ Oklahoma City	L 89–105	Zach Randolph (19)	Zach Randolph (19)	Randolph & Calathes (4)	Chesapeake Energy Arena; 18,203	39–14
All-Star Break
54	February 22	@ Portland	W 98–92	Marc Gasol (21)	Zach Randolph (9)	Mike Conley Jr. (8)	Moda Center; 19,782	40–14
55	February 23	@ L.A. Clippers	W 90–87	Mike Conley Jr. (18)	Zach Randolph (10)	Mike Conley Jr. (7)	Staples Center; 19,161	41–14
56	February 25	@ Sacramento	L 90–102	Zach Randolph (20)	Kosta Koufos (9)	Mike Conley Jr. (7)	Sleep Train Arena; 16,794	41–15
57	February 27	L.A. Clippers	L 79–97	Zach Randolph (20)	Zach Randolph (10)	Courtney Lee (4)	FedExForum; 18,119	41–16
58	February 28	@ Minnesota	W 101–97	Marc Gasol (27)	Randolph & Gasol (11)	Nick Calathes (6)	Target Center; 19,356	42–16

March : 9–8 (home: 5–3; road: 4–5)

Game	Date	Team	Score	High points	High rebounds	High assists	Location Attendance	Record
59	March 3	Utah	L 82–93	Courtney Lee (18)	Kosta Koufos (10)	Green & Conley (4)	FedExForum; 16,779	42–17
60	March 4	@ Houston	W 102–100	Marc Gasol (21)	Randolph & Allen (8)	Randolph, Gasol & Conley (6)	Toyota Center; 18,224	43–17
61	March 6	L.A. Lakers	W 97–90	Zach Randolph (24)	Zach Randolph (13)	Mike Conley Jr. (6)	FedExForum; 17,399	44–17
62	March 7	@ New Orleans	L 89–95	Jeff Green (20)	Tony Allen (8)	Nick Calathes (7)	Smoothie King Center; 17,346	44–18
63	March 9	@ Chicago	W 101–91	Marc Gasol (23)	Zach Randolph (9)	Mike Conley Jr. (9)	United Center; 21,815	45–18
64	March 11	@ Boston	L 92–95	Mike Conley Jr. (20)	Zach Randolph (8)	Zach Randolph (5)	TD Garden; 17,135	45–19
65	March 12	@ Washington	L 87–107	Stokes & Green (13)	Jarnell Stokes (8)	Beno Udrih (5)	Verizon Center; 18,186	45–20
66	March 14	Milwaukee	W 96–83	Courtney Lee (18)	Gasol & Koufos (7)	Marc Gasol (7)	FedExForum; 18,119	46–20
67	March 16	Denver	W 92–81	Zach Randolph (21)	Zach Randolph (16)	Gasol & Calathes (3)	FedExForum; 16,614	47–20
68	March 17	@ Detroit	L 95–105	Jeff Green (21)	Marc Gasol (11)	Beno Udrih (9)	The Palace of Auburn Hills; 14,399	47–21
69	March 20	@ Dallas	W 112–101	Zach Randolph (21)	Marc Gasol (10)	Zach Randolph (5)	American Airlines Center; 20,399	48–21
70	March 21	Portland	W 97–86	Jeff Green (23)	Tony Allen (11)	Mike Conley Jr. (9)	FedExForum; 17,898	49–21
71	March 23	@ New York	W 103–82	Zach Randolph (23)	Marc Gasol (8)	Zach Randolph (5)	Madison Square Garden; 19,812	50–21
72	March 25	Cleveland	L 89–111	Marc Gasol (18)	Tony Allen (8)	Conley & Calathes (9)	FedExForum; 18,119	50–22
73	March 27	Golden State	L 84–107	Conley & Green (16)	Jeff Green (8)	Mike Conley Jr. (5)	FedExForum; 18,119	50–23
74	March 29	@ San Antonio	L 89–103	Zach Randolph (20)	Zach Randolph (13)	Mike Conley Jr. (9)	AT&T Center; 18,581	50–24
75	March 30	Sacramento	W 97–83	Mike Conley Jr. (18)	Kosta Koufos (12)	Marc Gasol (6)	FedExForum; 17,218	51–24

April : 4–3 (home: 3–1; road: 1–2)

Game	Date	Team	Score	High points	High rebounds	High assists	Location Attendance	Record
76	April 3	Oklahoma City	W 100–92	Jeff Green (22)	Kosta Koufos (11)	Mike Conley Jr. (7)	FedExForum; 18,119	52–24
77	April 4	Washington	L 83–92	Marc Gasol (18)	Marc Gasol (14)	Mike Conley Jr. (8)	FedExForum; 18,119	52–25
78	April 8	New Orleans	W 110–74	Gasol & Green & Randolph (15)	Zach Randolph (13)	Gasol & Randolph (6)	FedExForum; 17,518	53–25
79	April 10	@ Utah	W 89–88	Marc Gasol (22)	Zach Randolph (10)	Zach Randolph (6)	EnergySolutions Arena; 18,873	54–25
80	April 11	@ L.A. Clippers	L 86–94	Zach Randolph (21)	Zach Randolph (13)	Zach Randolph (5)	Staples Center; 19,401	54–26
81	April 13	@ Golden State	L 107–111	Jordan Adams (19)	JaMychal Green (8)	Gasol & Randolph & Smith (4)	Oracle Arena; 19,596	54–27
82	April 15	Indiana	W 95–83	Marc Gasol (33)	Marc Gasol (13)	Nick Calathes (6)	FedExForum; 17,109	55–27

2014–15 season schedule

== Playoffs ==
2015 playoff game log
Total: 6–5 (home: 4–2; road: 2–3)
First Round: 4–1 (home: 3–0; road: 1–1)

Game	Date	Team	Score	High points	High rebounds	High assists	Location Attendance	Series
1	April 19	Portland	W 100–86	Beno Udrih (20)	Gasol & Randolph (11)	Gasol, Udrih (7)	FedExForum; 18,119	1–0
2	April 22	Portland	W 97–82	Conley & Lee (18)	Zach Randolph (10)	Mike Conley (6)	FedExForum; 18,119	2–0
3	April 25	@ Portland	W 115–109	Marc Gasol (25)	Marc Gasol (7)	Conley, Gasol & Randolph (4)	Moda Center; 19,945	3–0
4	April 27	@ Portland	L 92–99	Marc Gasol (21)	Tony Allen (10)	Marc Gasol (6)	Moda Center; 19,541	3–1
5	April 30	Portland	W 99–93	Marc Gasol (26)	Marc Gasol (14)	Allen & Calathes (4)	FedExForum; 18,119	4–1

Conference Semifinals: 2–4 (home: 1–2; road: 1–2)

Game	Date	Team	Score	High points	High rebounds	High assists	Location Attendance	Series
1	May 3	@ Golden State	L 86–101	Marc Gasol (21)	Gasol & Randolph (9)	Zach Randolph (5)	Oracle Arena; 19,596	0–1
2	May 5	@ Golden State	W 97–90	Mike Conley (22)	Carter & Randolph (7)	Zach Randolph (4)	Oracle Arena; 19,596	1–1
3	May 9	Golden State	W 99–89	Zach Randolph (22)	Marc Gasol (15)	Mike Conley (5)	FedEx Forum; 18,119	2–1
4	May 11	Golden State	L 84–101	Marc Gasol (22)	Zach Randolph (11)	Mike Conley (7)	FedEx Forum; 18,119	2–2
5	May 13	@ Golden State	L 78–98	Marc Gasol (18)	Marc Gasol (12)	Marc Gasol (6)	Oracle Arena; 19,596	2–3
6	May 15	Golden State	L 95–108	Marc Gasol (21)	Marc Gasol (12)	Mike Conley (9)	FedEx Forum; 18,119	2–4

2015 playoff schedule

== Player statistics ==
=== Ragular season ===
Player	POS	GP	GS	MP	REB	AST	STL	BLK	PTS	MPG	RPG	APG	SPG	BPG	PPG
Marc Gasol	C	81	81	2,687	630	307	70	131	1,413	33.2	7.8	3.8	.9	1.6	17.4
Kosta Koufos	C	81	3	1,348	426	37	29	63	419	16.6	5.3	.5	.4	.8	5.2
Beno Udrih	PG	79	12	1,494	143	220	46	8	605	18.9	1.8	2.8	.6	.1	7.7
Courtney Lee	SG	77	74	2,354	178	151	75	12	777	30.6	2.3	2.0	1.0	.2	10.1
Zach Randolph	PF	71	71	2,304	747	153	69	14	1,143	32.5	10.5	2.2	1.0	.2	16.1
Mike Conley Jr.	PG	70	70	2,225	209	375	89	14	1,107	31.8	3.0	5.4	1.3	.2	15.8
Vince Carter	SG	66	1	1,091	133	79	43	14	384	16.5	2.0	1.2	.7	.2	5.8
Tony Allen	SG	63	41	1,648	280	86	129	30	539	26.2	4.4	1.4	2.0	.5	8.6
Jon Leuer	PF	63	6	824	207	46	17	9	286	13.1	3.3	.7	.3	.1	4.5
Nick Calathes	SG	58	0	838	106	146	63	5	243	14.4	1.8	2.5	1.1	.1	4.2
Jeff Green^{†}	SF	45	37	1,361	187	81	26	21	588	30.2	4.2	1.8	.6	.5	13.1
Quincy Pondexter^{†}	SG	30	2	540	57	28	5	5	134	18.0	1.9	.9	.2	.2	4.5
Jordan Adams	SG	30	0	248	28	16	16	7	94	8.3	.9	.5	.5	.2	3.1
Tayshaun Prince^{†}	SF	26	9	628	83	37	9	6	190	24.2	3.2	1.4	.3	.2	7.3
JaMychal Green^{†}	PF	20	1	139	39	4	5	3	54	7.0	2.0	.2	.3	.2	2.7
Jarnell Stokes	PF	19	2	126	34	4	5	5	57	6.6	1.8	.2	.3	.3	3.0
Russ Smith^{†}	PG	6	0	36	3	6	3	0	25	6.0	.5	1.0	.5	.0	4.2
Tyrus Thomas	PF	2	0	7	0	1	0	0	4	3.5	.0	.5	.0	.0	2.0
Kalin Lucas	PG	1	0	6	0	0	1	0	0	6.0	.0	.0	1.0	.0	.0

- ^{†} Denotes player spent time with another team in the season. Stats reflect time with the Grizzlies only.

=== Playoffs ===
Player	POS	GP	GS	MP	REB	AST	STL	BLK	PTS	MPG	RPG	APG	SPG	BPG	PPG
Marc Gasol	C	11	11	416	113	49	10	19	217	37.8	10.3	4.5	.9	1.7	19.7
Zach Randolph	PF	11	11	382	93	23	6	0	172	34.7	8.5	2.1	.5	.0	15.6
Courtney Lee	SG	11	11	367	28	24	12	0	146	33.4	2.5	2.2	1.1	.0	13.3
Jeff Green	SF	11	2	298	52	19	5	5	98	27.1	4.7	1.7	.5	.5	8.9
Vince Carter	SG	11	0	196	47	11	7	2	69	17.8	4.3	1.0	.6	.2	6.3
Kosta Koufos	C	11	0	127	39	4	4	6	37	11.5	3.5	.4	.4	.5	3.4
Tony Allen	SG	10	9	279	52	15	24	11	66	27.9	5.2	1.5	2.4	1.1	6.6
Beno Udrih	PG	10	0	175	20	21	5	0	76	17.5	2.0	2.1	.5	.0	7.6
Nick Calathes	SG	9	3	126	16	16	9	1	33	14.0	1.8	1.8	1.0	.1	3.7
Mike Conley Jr.	PG	8	8	243	9	40	11	0	115	30.4	1.1	5.0	1.4	.0	14.4
JaMychal Green	PF	5	0	8	3	0	1	1	2	1.6	.6	.0	.2	.2	.4
Jordan Adams	SG	4	0	10	1	0	1	0	7	2.5	.3	.0	.3	.0	1.8
Jon Leuer	PF	4	0	9	5	0	0	0	4	2.3	1.3	.0	.0	.0	1.0
Russ Smith	PG	2	0	3	0	2	0	0	0	1.5	.0	1.0	.0	.0	.0

== Injuries ==
Player	Duration		Injury type	Games missed
Player	Start	End	Injury type	Games missed

== Roster ==
2014–15 Memphis Grizzlies roster
Players

Pos.	No.	Player	Height	Weight	DOB	From
G	3	Jordan Adams	6 ft 5 in (1.96 m)	220 lb (100 kg)	1994–07–08	UCLA
G/F	9	Tony Allen	6 ft 4 in (1.93 m)	213 lb (97 kg)	1982–01–11	Oklahoma State
G	12	Nick Calathes	6 ft 6 in (1.98 m)	213 lb (97 kg)	1989–02–07	Florida
G/F	15	Vince Carter	6 ft 6 in (1.98 m)	220 lb (100 kg)	1977–01–26	North Carolina
G	11	Mike Conley	6 ft 1 in (1.85 m)	185 lb (84 kg)	1987–10–11	Ohio State
C	33	Marc Gasol	7 ft 1 in (2.16 m)	265 lb (120 kg)	1985–01–29	Lausanne CS (TN)
F	0	JaMychal Green	6 ft 8 in (2.03 m)	228 lb (103 kg)	1990–06–21	Alabama
F	32	Jeff Green	6 ft 9 in (2.06 m)	235 lb (107 kg)	1986–08–28	Georgetown
C	41	Kosta Koufos	7 ft 0 in (2.13 m)	265 lb (120 kg)	1989–02–24	Ohio State
G/F	5	Courtney Lee	6 ft 5 in (1.96 m)	200 lb (91 kg)	1985–10–03	Western Kentucky
F	30	Jon Leuer	6 ft 10 in (2.08 m)	228 lb (103 kg)	1989–05–14	Wisconsin
F	50	Zach Randolph	6 ft 9 in (2.06 m)	260 lb (118 kg)	1981–07–16	Michigan State
G	2	Russ Smith	6 ft 0 in (1.83 m)	170 lb (77 kg)	1991–04–19	Louisville
F	1	Jarnell Stokes	6 ft 9 in (2.06 m)	263 lb (119 kg)	1994–01–07	Tennessee
G	19	Beno Udrih	6 ft 3 in (1.91 m)	210 lb (95 kg)	1982–07–05	Slovenia
F	21	Tayshaun Prince	6 ft 9 in (2.06 m)	212 lb (96 kg)	1980-02-28	Kentucky

Coaches
Head coach
- Dave Joerger
Assistant(s)
- Jeff Bzdelik
- Jason March
- Shawn Respert
- Bob Thornton
- Duane Ticknor
- Elston Turner
- John Townsend (player development)

Legend
- (DP) Unsigned draft pick
- (FA) Free agent
- (S) Suspended
- (DL) On assignment to D-League affiliate
- Injured

Roster
Updated: 2015–03–30

== Transactions ==
=== Free agents ===
==== Re-signed ====
Player	Signed	Contract	Ref.

==== Additions ====
Player	Signed	Former team	Ref.

==== Subtractions ====
Player	Reason left	Date	New team	Ref.

== Awards ==
Player	Award	Date awarded	Ref.
