= 2014–15 Los Angeles Lakers season =

NBA professional basketball team season

- Head coach: Byron Scott
- President: Jeanie Buss
- General manager: Mitch Kupchak
- Owners: Jerry Buss family trust
- Arena: Staples Center

Results
- Record: 21–61 (.256)
- Place: Division: 5th (Pacific); Conference: 14th (Western)
- Playoff finish: Did not qualify
- Stats at Basketball Reference

Local media
- Television: TWC SportsNet and TWC Deportes
- Radio: 710 ESPN

The 2014–15 Los Angeles Lakers season was the franchise's 67th season, its 66th season in the National Basketball Association (NBA), and its 55th in Los Angeles. Coming off from one of the worst seasons in franchise history and missing the playoffs, the team looked to rebound. Mike D'Antoni resigned in late April following two miserable seasons, leaving the team without a head coach. In the offseason, Pau Gasol and Jodie Meeks left for Chicago and Detroit, respectively, leaving big shoes to fill. After failing to land the biggest names in the offseason like Carmelo Anthony and LeBron James, the Lakers brought back numerous key role players from last season including Nick Young, Jordan Hill, and Ryan Kelly. The Lakers later acquired point guard Jeremy Lin in a trade with Houston and won the bidding rights to power forward Carlos Boozer after being amnestied by Chicago in the offseason. The Lakers also drafted Kentucky's star power forward Julius Randle and shooting guard Jordan Clarkson in the 2014 NBA Draft. The team then hired Lakers Showtime player and former Coach of the Year, Byron Scott as head coach in late July. On December 14, 2014, Kobe Bryant scored 26 points to pass Michael Jordan for third on the NBA's all-time scoring list in a 100–94 win over Minnesota.

The Lakers started the season a franchise-worst 1–9. Rookie Julius Randle was injured opening night and missed the remainder of the season. On January 28, 2015, Kobe Bryant underwent season-ending surgery for a rotator cuff tear in his right shoulder. On March 21, 2015, Steve Nash announced his retirement. The Lakers finished with a 21–61 record, placing them last in the Pacific division for the second straight season and fourteenth in the Western conference. This was the first 60 loss season in franchise history.

== Key dates ==
- June 26: The 2014 NBA draft took place at Barclays Center in Brooklyn, New York.
- July 1: 2014 NBA free agency began.

=== Draft picks ===
Round	Pick	Player	Position	Nationality	College
1	7	Julius Randle	PF	United States	Kentucky
2	46	Jordan Clarkson	PG	United States	Missouri

== Preseason ==
On October 23, 2014, point guard Steve Nash was ruled out for the season due to a recurring back injury.

=== Game log ===
2014 pre-season game log
Total: 3–5 (Home: 3–5; Road: 0–0)
Pre-season: 3–5 (home: 3–5; road: 0–0)

Game	Date	Team	Score	High points	High rebounds	High assists	Location Attendance	Record
1	October 6	Denver	W 98–95	Jordan Clarkson (14)	Jordan Hill (11)	Jeremy Lin (10)	Valley View Casino Center; 10,108	1–0
2	October 9	Golden State	L 105–120	Carlos Boozer (16)	Randle, Davis (7)	Lin, Price (4)	Staples Center; 13,128	1–1
3	October 12	Golden State	L 75–116	Sacre, Ellington (12)	Jordan Hill (7)	Kobe Bryant (5)	Citizens Business Bank Arena; 7,842	1–2
4	October 16	Utah	L 86–119	Kobe Bryant (27)	Jordan Hill (14)	Kobe Bryant (4)	Honda Center; 8,931	1–3
5	October 19	Utah	W 98–91	Kobe Bryant (26)	Carlos Boozer (9)	Ronnie Price (10)	Staples Center; 17,733	2–3
6	October 21	Phoenix	L 108–114 (OT)	Kobe Bryant (27)	Wesley Johnson (8)	Ronnie Price (10)	Honda Center; 8,037	2–4
7	October 22	Portland	W 94–86	Julius Randle (17)	Randle, Sacre (8)	Jeremy Lin (5)	Citizens Business Bank Arena; 7,174	3–4
8	October 24	Sacramento	L 92–93	Jeremy Lin (19)	Ed Davis (13)	Jeremy Lin (7)	MGM Grand Garden Arena; 10,890	3–5

2014–15 season schedule

== Regular season ==
On October 28, 2014, rookie Julius Randle broke his right tibia during the Lakers' season opener against the Houston Rockets, and was expected to miss the remainder of the season. Through the season's first 10 games, the Lakers were 1–9, the worst start in the 66-year history of the franchise.

=== Standings ===
Pacific Division	W	L	PCT	GB	Home	Road	Div	GP
z-Golden State Warriors	67	15	.817	–	39‍–‍2	28‍–‍13	13–3	82
x-Los Angeles Clippers	56	26	.683	11.0	30‍–‍11	26‍–‍15	12–4	82
Phoenix Suns	39	43	.476	28.0	22‍–‍19	17‍–‍24	6–10	82
Sacramento Kings	29	53	.354	38.0	18‍–‍23	11‍–‍30	7–9	82
Los Angeles Lakers	21	61	.256	46.0	12‍–‍29	9‍–‍32	2–14	82

=== Game log ===
2014–15 game log
Total: 21–61 (Home: 12–29; Road: 9–32)
October: 0–3 (home: 0–2; road: 0–1)

Game	Date	Team	Score	High points	High rebounds	High assists	Location Attendance	Record
1	October 28	Houston	L 90–108	Kobe Bryant (19)	Jordan Hill (10)	Jeremy Lin (6)	Staples Center; 18,997	0–1
2	October 29	@ Phoenix	L 99–119	Kobe Bryant (31)	Jordan Hill (11)	Ronnie Price (5)	US Airways Center; 17,523	0–2
3	October 31	L.A. Clippers	L 111–118	Jordan Hill (23)	Carlos Boozer (7)	Jeremy Lin (9)	Staples Center; 18,997	0–3

November : 4–10 (home: 2–6; road: 2–4)

Game	Date	Team	Score	High points	High rebounds	High assists	Location Attendance	Record
4	November 1	@ Golden State	L 104–127	Kobe Bryant (28)	Bryant & Davis (6)	Lin & Price (6)	Oracle Arena; 19,596	0–4
5	November 4	Phoenix	L 106–112	Kobe Bryant (39)	Jordan Hill (15)	Carlos Boozer (4)	Staples Center; 18,997	0–5
6	November 9	Charlotte	W 107–92	Bryant & Lin (21)	Hill & Bryant (6)	Ronnie Price (8)	Staples Center; 18,997	1–5
7	November 11	@ Memphis	L 102–107	Kobe Bryant (28)	Jordan Hill (14)	Kobe Bryant (6)	FedEx Forum; 17,618	1–6
8	November 12	@ New Orleans	L 102–109	Kobe Bryant (33)	Ed Davis (11)	Kobe Bryant (5)	Smoothie King Center; 17,359	1–7
9	November 14	San Antonio	L 80–93	Carlos Boozer (19)	Jordan Hill (11)	Kobe Bryant (6)	Staples Center; 18,997	1–8
10	November 16	Golden State	L 115–136	Kobe Bryant (44)	Jordan Hill (11)	Ronnie Price (5)	Staples Center; 18,997	1–9
11	November 18	@ Atlanta	W 114–109	Kobe Bryant (28)	Hill & Boozer (10)	Jeremy Lin (10)	Philips Arena; 17,848	2–9
12	November 19	@ Houston	W 98–92	Kobe Bryant (29)	Carlos Boozer (13)	Kobe Bryant (7)	Toyota Center; 18,245	3–9
13	November 21	@ Dallas	L 106–140	Jeremy Lin (18)	Jordan Hill (10)	Kobe Bryant (7)	American Airlines Center; 20,353	3–10
14	November 23	Denver	L 94–101 (OT)	Kobe Bryant (27)	Jordan Hill (14)	Jeremy Lin (5)	Staples Center; 18,997	3–11
15	November 26	Memphis	L 93–99	Kobe Bryant (22)	Ed Davis (8)	Lin & Price (5)	Staples Center; 18,997	3–12
16	November 28	Minnesota	L 119–120	Kobe Bryant (26)	Ed Davis (10)	Jeremy Lin (11)	Staples Center; 18,997	3–13
17	November 30	Toronto	W 129–122 (OT)	Kobe Bryant (31)	Jordan Hill (12)	Kobe Bryant (12)	Staples Center; 18,997	4–13

December : 6–9 (home: 2–3; road: 4–6)

Game	Date	Team	Score	High points	High rebounds	High assists	Location Attendance	Record
18	December 2	@ Detroit	W 106–96	Jordan Hill (22)	Jordan Hill (13)	Kobe Bryant (13)	The Palace of Auburn Hills; 14,083	5–13
19	December 3	@ Washington	L 95–111	Kobe Bryant (29)	Davis & Boozer (8)	Jeremy Lin (5)	Verizon Center; 18,490	5–14
20	December 5	@ Boston	L 96–113	Kobe Bryant (22)	Ed Davis (9)	Bryant, Price & Ellington (3)	TD Garden; 18,624	5–15
21	December 7	New Orleans	L 87–104	Kobe Bryant (14)	Davis & Hill (7)	Lin & Bryant (4)	Staples Center; 18,997	5–16
22	December 9	Sacramento	W 98–95	Kobe Bryant (32)	Carlos Boozer (9)	Bryant & Price (6)	Staples Center; 18,267	6–16
23	December 12	@ San Antonio	W 112–110 (OT)	Nick Young (29)	Carlos Boozer (13)	Kobe Bryant (9)	AT&T Center; 18,581	7–16
24	December 14	@ Minnesota	W 100–94	Kobe Bryant (26)	Carlos Boozer (13)	Johnson & Lin (6)	Target Center; 15,008	8–16
25	December 15	@ Indiana	L 91–110	Kobe Bryant (21)	Carlos Boozer (10)	Kobe Bryant (3)	Bankers Life Fieldhouse; 15,261	8–17
26	December 19	Oklahoma City	L 103–104	Ed Davis (18)	Ed Davis (9)	Kobe Bryant (8)	Staples Center; 18,997	8–18
27	December 21	@ Sacramento	L 101–108	Nick Young (26)	Jordan Hill (9)	Jeremy Lin (5)	Sleep Train Arena; 17,317	8–19
28	December 23	Golden State	W 115–105	Carlos Boozer (18)	Carlos Boozer (9)	Ronnie Price (8)	Staples Center; 18,997	9–19
29	December 25	@ Chicago	L 93–113	Wesley Johnson (18)	Ed Davis (14)	Ronnie Price (8)	United Center; 22,865	9–20
30	December 26	@ Dallas	L 98–102	Carlos Boozer (18)	Ed Davis (11)	Jeremy Lin (7)	American Airlines Center; 20,424	9–21
31	December 28	Phoenix	L 107–116	Nick Young (21)	Bryant & Davis (9)	Kobe Bryant (7)	Staples Center; 18,997	9–22
32	December 30	@ Denver	W 111–103	Kobe Bryant (23)	Kobe Bryant (11)	Kobe Bryant (11)	Pepsi Center; 17,248	10–22

January : 3–12 (home: 3–6; road: 0–6)

Game	Date	Team	Score	High points	High rebounds	High assists	Location Attendance	Record
33	January 2	Memphis	L 106–109	Lin & Davis (20)	Kobe Bryant (9)	Kobe Bryant (8)	Staples Center; 18,997	10–23
34	January 4	Indiana	W 88–87	Nick Young (22)	Bryant & Davis (6)	Kobe Bryant (6)	Staples Center1; 8,997	11–23
35	January 5	@ Portland	L 94–98	Jordan Hill (23)	Jordan Hill (11)	Ronnie Price (8)	Rose Garden; 19,827	11–24
36	January 7	@ LA Clippers	L 84–101	Jordan Clarkson (14)	Kobe Bryant (8)	Kobe Bryant (7)	Staples Center; 19,487	11–25
37	January 9	Orlando	W 101–84	Jeremy Lin (18)	Carlos Boozer (14)	Jeremy Lin (6)	Staples Center; 18,997	12–25
38	January 11	Portland	L 94–106	Wesley Johnson (17)	Carlos Boozer (9)	Ronnie Price (12)	Staples Center; 18,997	12–26
39	January 13	Miami	L 75–78	Bryant, Hill & Davis (12)	Tarik Black (9)	Kobe Bryant (7)	Staples Center; 18,997	12–27
40	January 15	Cleveland	L 102–109	Jordan Hill (20)	Bryant & Hill (6)	Kobe Bryant (17)	Staples Center; 18,997	12–28
41	January 16	@ Utah	L 85–94	Nick Young (23)	Jordan Hill (11)	Jeremy Lin (3)	EnergySolutions Arena; 19,911	12–29
42	January 19	@ Phoenix	L 100–115	Nick Young (24)	Ed Davis (11)	Jeremy Lin (10)	US Airways Center; 17,435	12–30
43	January 21	@ New Orleans	L 80–96	Jordan Hill (15)	Jordan Hill (13)	Wesley Johnson (4)	Smoothie King Center; 16,268	12–31
44	January 23	@ San Antonio	L 85–99	Nick Young (17)	Sacre & Boozer (7)	Ronnie Price (6)	AT&T Center; 18,581	12–32
45	January 25	Houston	L 87–99	Carlos Boozer (18)	Ed Davis (13)	Jeremy Lin (6)	Staples Center; 18,997	12–33
46	January 27	Washington	L 92–98	Wayne Ellington (28)	Jordan Hill (11)	Jeremy Lin (8)	Staples Center; 18,997	12–34
47	January 29	Chicago	W 123–118 (2OT)	Jordan Hill (26)	Jordan Hill (12)	Jeremy Lin (5)	Staples Center; 18,997	13–34

February : 3–7 (home: 2–2; road: 1–5)

Game	Date	Team	Score	High points	High rebounds	High assists	Location Attendance	Record
48	February 1	@ New York	L 80–92	Boozer & Clarkson (19)	Carlos Boozer (10)	Jeremy Lin (7)	Madison Square Garden; 19,812	13–35
49	February 4	@ Milwaukee	L 105–113 (OT)	Carlos Boozer (28)	Ed Davis (20)	Jeremy Lin (6)	BMO Harris Bradley Center; 19,812	13–36
50	February 6	@ Orlando	L 97–103 (OT)	Ryan Kelly (20)	Wesley Johnson (9)	Jordan Clarkson (6)	Amway Center; 16,206	13–37
51	February 8	@ Cleveland	L 105–120	Jordan Clarkson (20)	Ed Davis (9)	Jordan Clarkson (4)	Quicken Loans Arena; 20,562	13–38
52	February 10	Denver	L 96–106	Carlos Boozer (21)	Carlos Boozer (10)	Jordan Clarkson (7)	Staples Center; 18,466	13–39
53	February 11	@ Portland	L 86–102	Jordan Clarkson (17)	Ed Davis (9)	Jordan Clarkson (4)	Rose Garden; 19,585	13–40
All-Star Break
54	February 20	Brooklyn	L 105–114	Jeremy Lin (18)	Ed Davis (14)	Ronnie Price (8)	Staples Center; 19,585	13–41
55	February 22	Boston	W 118–111 (OT)	Jeremy Lin (25)	Carlos Boozer (8)	Jeremy Lin (6)	Staples Center; 18,997	14–41
56	February 25	@ Utah	W 100–97	Jordan Clarkson (22)	Wayne Ellington (10)	Clarkson & Lin & Davis (3)	EnergySolutions Arena; 19,911	15–41
57	February 27	Milwaukee	W 101–93	Jordan Clarkson (16)	Ed Davis (9)	Jeremy Lin (6)	Staples Center; 18,997	16–41

March : 4–12 (home: 2–5; road: 2–7)

Game	Date	Team	Score	High points	High rebounds	High assists	Location Attendance	Record
58	March 1	Oklahoma City	L 101–108	Jeremy Lin (20)	Jordan Hill (12)	Jeremy Lin (8)	Staples Center; 18,997	16–42
59	March 3	@ Charlotte	L 103–104	Jeremy Lin (23)	Carlos Boozer (11)	Jeremy Lin (8)	Time Warner Cable Arena; 18,997	16–43
60	March 4	@ Miami	L 94–100	Ellington & Davis (14)	Ed Davis (12)	Jeremy Lin (9)	American Airlines Arena; 19,600	16–44
61	March 6	@ Memphis	L 90–97	Jordan Clarkson (25)	Carlos Boozer (9)	Jordan Clarkson (6)	FedEx Forum; 19,600	16–45
62	March 8	Dallas	L 93–100	Carlos Boozer (17)	Boozer & Davis (8)	Lin & Clarkson (5)	Staples Center; 18,997	16–46
63	March 10	Detroit	W 93–85	Jordan Hill (26)	Carlos Boozer (16)	Jordan Clarkson (8)	Staples Center; 17,771	17–46
64	March 12	New York	L 94–101	Jordan Hill (19)	Tarik Black (11)	Jeremy Lin (7)	Staples Center; 18,997	17–47
65	March 15	Atlanta	L 86–91	Boozer & Kelly (13)	Ed Davis (13)	Jordan Clarkson (6)	Staples Center; 17,422	17–48
66	March 16	@ Golden State	L 105–108	Clarkson & Ellington (17)	Jordan Hill (12)	Jordan Hill (5)	Oracle Arena; 19,596	17–49
67	March 19	Utah	L 73–80	Tarik Black (13)	Black & Hill (10)	Jordan Clarkson (6)	Staples Center; 17,407	17–50
68	March 22	Philadelphia	W 101–87	Jeremy Lin (29)	Ed Davis (11)	Jeremy Lin (5)	Staples Center; 17,891	18–50
69	March 24	@ Oklahoma City	L 117–127	Jordan Clarkson (30)	Tarik Black (6)	Lin & Clarkson (7)	Chesapeake Energy Arena; 18,203	18–51
70	March 25	@ Minnesota	W 101–99 (OT)	Jordan Clarkson (20)	Ed Davis (9)	Lin & Clarkson (5)	Target Center; 13,438	19–51
71	March 27	@ Toronto	L 83–94	Jeremy Lin (18)	Tarik Black (10)	Jeremy Lin (5)	Air Canada Centre; 19,800	19–52
72	March 29	@ Brooklyn	L 99–107	Jordan Hill (22)	Jordan Hill (16)	Jordan Clarkson (7)	Barclays Center; 17,732	19–53
73	March 30	@ Philadelphia	W 113–111 (OT)	Jordan Clarkson (26)	Wesley Johnson (11)	Jordan Clarkson (11)	Wells Fargo Center; 13,501	20–53

April : 1–8 (home: 1–5; road: 0–3)

Game	Date	Team	Score	High points	High rebounds	High assists	Location Attendance	Record
74	April 1	New Orleans	L 92–113	Jordan Clarkson (18)	Wesley Johnson (8)	Jordan Clarkson (10)	Staples Center; 17,165	20–54
75	April 3	Portland	L 77–107	Jordan Clarkson (27)	Wesley Johnson (15)	Jordan Clarkson (5)	Staples Center; 18,997	20–55
76	April 5	LA Clippers	L 78–106	Wesley Johnson (16)	Tarik Black (9)	Ryan Kelly (7)	Staples Center; 18,997	20–56
77	April 7	@ LA Clippers	L 100–105	Jordan Clarkson (20)	Ed Davis (11)	Jordan Clarkson (6)	Staples Center; 19,438	20–57
78	April 8	@ Denver	L 101–119	Jordan Clarkson (21)	Ed Davis (12)	Jordan Clarkson (9)	Pepsi Center; 13,338	20–58
79	April 10	Minnesota	W 106–98	Ryan Kelly (21)	Tarik Black (10)	Jordan Clarkson (9)	Staples Center; 17,880	21–58
80	April 12	Dallas	L 106–120	Jordan Clarkson (26)	Tarik Black (19)	Clarkson & Kelly (6)	Staples Center; 18,071	21–59
81	April 13	@ Sacramento	L 92–102	Jordan Clarkson (23)	Ed Davis (14)	Jabari Brown (7)	Sleep Train Arena; 17,317	21–60
82	April 15	Sacramento	L 99–122	Jabari Brown (32)	Ed Davis (12)	Vander Blue (8)	Staples Center; 18,997	21–61

2014–15 season schedule

== Player statistics ==
Statistics (Summer League, preseason, and regular season)

Legend
GP	Games played	GS	Games started	MPG	Minutes per game
FG%	Field-goal percentage	3P%	3-point field-goal percentage	FT%	Free-throw percentage
RPG	Rebounds per game	APG	Assists per game	SPG	Steals per game
BPG	Blocks per game	PPG	Points per game

=== Summer League ===
Los Angeles Lakers statistics
Player	GP	GS	MPG	FG%	3P%	FT%	RPG	APG	SPG	BPG	PPG

=== Preseason ===
Los Angeles Lakers statistics
Player	GP	GS	MPG	FG%	3P%	FT%	RPG	APG	SPG	BPG	PPG

=== Regular season ===
Los Angeles Lakers statistics
Player	GP	GS	MPG	FG%	3P%	FT%	RPG	APG	SPG	BPG	PPG
Jordan Clarkson	59	38	25	.448	.314	.829	3.2	3.5	0.9	0.2	14.5
Kobe Bryant	35	35	34.5	.373	.293	.813	5.7	5.6	1.3	0.2	22.3
Wesley Johnson	76	59	29.5	.414	.351	.804	4.2	1.6	0.8	0.6	9.9
Ryan Kelly	52	34	23.7	.337	.336	.832	2.8	1.8	0.6	0.5	6.4
Jordan Hill	70	57	26.8	.459	.273	.738	7.9	1.5	0.5	0.7	12
Jeremy Lin	74	30	25.8	.424	.369	.795	2.6	4.6	1.1	0.4	11.2
Nick Young	42	0	23.8	.366	.369	.892	2.3	1	0.5	0.3	13.4
Carlos Boozer	71	26	23.8	.499	.000	.627	6.8	1.3	0.6	0.2	11.8
Wayne Ellington	65	36	25.8	.412	.370	.813	3.2	1.6	0.5	0	10
Jabari Brown	19	5	29.9	.412	.371	.753	1.9	2.1	0.6	0.1	11.9
Ronnie Price	43	20	22.8	.345	.284	.800	1.6	3.8	1.6	0.1	5.1
Ed Davis	79	24	23.3	.601	.000	.487	7,6	1.2	0.6	1.2	8.3
Robert Sacre	67	18	16.9	.412	.000	.671	3.5	0.8	0.4	0.6	4.6
Tarik Black	63	39	19	.575	.000	.551	5.8	0.7	0.3	0.4	6
Xavier Henry	9	0	9.6	.231	.000	.583	0.4	0.3	0.3	0	2.2

== Injuries ==
Player	Duration		Injury type	Games missed
Player	Start	End	Injury type	Games missed

== Roster ==
2014–15 Los Angeles Lakers roster
Players

Pos.	No.	Player	Height	Weight	DOB	From
C	28	Tarik Black	6 ft 9 in (2.06 m)	257 lb (117 kg)	1991-11-22	Kansas
SG	12	Vander Blue	6 ft 4 in (1.93 m)	200 lb (91 kg)	1992-07-22	Marquette
PF	5	Carlos Boozer	6 ft 9 in (2.06 m)	266 lb (121 kg)	1981-11-20	Duke
SG	15	Jabari Brown	6 ft 5 in (1.96 m)	214 lb (97 kg)	1992-12-18	Missouri
SG	24	Kobe Bryant	6 ft 6 in (1.98 m)	205 lb (93 kg)	1978-08-23	Lower Merion HS (PA)
PG	6	Jordan Clarkson	6 ft 5 in (1.96 m)	185 lb (84 kg)	1992-06-07	Missouri
PF	21	Ed Davis	6 ft 10 in (2.08 m)	225 lb (102 kg)	1989-06-05	North Carolina
SG	2	Wayne Ellington	6 ft 4 in (1.93 m)	200 lb (91 kg)	1987-11-29	North Carolina
C	27	Jordan Hill	6 ft 10 in (2.08 m)	235 lb (107 kg)	1987-07-27	Arizona
SF	11	Wesley Johnson	6 ft 7 in (2.01 m)	215 lb (98 kg)	1987-07-11	Syracuse
PF	4	Ryan Kelly	6 ft 11 in (2.11 m)	230 lb (104 kg)	1991-04-09	Duke
PG	17	Jeremy Lin	6 ft 3 in (1.91 m)	200 lb (91 kg)	1988-08-23	Harvard
PG	9	Ronnie Price	6 ft 2 in (1.88 m)	190 lb (86 kg)	1983-06-21	Utah Valley
PF	30	Julius Randle	6 ft 9 in (2.06 m)	250 lb (113 kg)	1994-11-29	Kentucky
C	50	Robert Sacre	7 ft 0 in (2.13 m)	260 lb (118 kg)	1989-06-06	Gonzaga
SF	0	Nick Young	6 ft 7 in (2.01 m)	210 lb (95 kg)	1985-06-01	USC

Coaches
Head coach
- Byron Scott
Assistant(s)
- Jim Eyen
- Larry Lewis
- Mark Madsen
- Paul Pressey
- Thomas Scott

Legend
- (DP) Unsigned draft pick
- (FA) Free agent
- (S) Suspended
- (DL) On assignment to D-League affiliate
- Injured

Roster
Updated: April 13, 2015

== Transactions ==
=== Free agents ===
==== Re-signed ====
Player	Signed	Contract	Ref.

Nick Young

Jordan Hill

Xavier Henry

Wesley Johnson

Ryan Kelly

==== Additions ====
Player	Signed	Former team	Ref.

==== Subtractions ====
Player	Reason left	Date	New team	Ref.

== Awards ==
Player	Award	Date awarded	Ref.
