= 2014–15 New Orleans Pelicans season =

Sports season

- Head coach: Monty Williams
- General manager: Dell Demps
- Owner: Tom Benson
- Arena: Smoothie King Center

Results
- Record: 45–37 (.549)
- Place: Division: 5th (Southwest); Conference: 8th (Western)
- Playoff finish: First Round (lost to Warriors 0–4)
- Stats at Basketball Reference

Local media
- Television: Fox Sports New Orleans
- Radio: WWL-FM

The 2014–15 New Orleans Pelicans season is the 13th season of the franchise in the National Basketball Association (NBA). Despite finishing last in the Southwest division for the fourth straight season, the Pelicans finished with a 45–37 record and clinched the eighth seed in the Western conference. The Pelicans clinched a seed in the playoffs for the first time since 2011 when the team was called the Hornets. New Orleans' season ended after they were swept 4–0 in a first round playoff series by the eventual NBA champion Golden State Warriors.

The Pelicans would not return to the playoffs until 2018.

== Preseason ==
=== Draft picks ===
The Pelicans did not have a pick in the 2014 NBA Draft. Their first-round selection was conveyed to the Philadelphia 76ers due to the 2013 Jrue Holiday trade as it fell outside the top 5 following the NBA draft lottery, while their second-round selection was traded to the Minnesota Timberwolves in 2009.

== Regular season ==
=== Standings ===
Southwest Division	W	L	PCT	GB	Home	Road	Div	GP
y-Houston Rockets	56	26	.683	–	30‍–‍11	26‍–‍15	8–8	82
x-Memphis Grizzlies	55	27	.671	1.0	31‍–‍10	24‍–‍17	9–7	82
x-San Antonio Spurs	55	27	.671	1.0	33‍–‍8	22‍–‍19	8–8	82
x-Dallas Mavericks	50	32	.610	6.0	27‍–‍14	23‍–‍18	7–9	82
x-New Orleans Pelicans	45	37	.549	11.0	28‍–‍13	17‍–‍24	8–8	82

Western Conference
#	Team	W	L	PCT	GB	GP
1	z-Golden State Warriors *	67	15	.817	–	82
2	y-Houston Rockets *	56	26	.683	11.0	82
3	x-Los Angeles Clippers	56	26	.683	11.0	82
4	y-Portland Trail Blazers *	51	31	.622	16.0	82
5	x-Memphis Grizzlies	55	27	.671	12.0	82
6	x-San Antonio Spurs	55	27	.671	12.0	82
7	x-Dallas Mavericks	50	32	.610	17.0	82
8	x-New Orleans Pelicans	45	37	.549	22.0	82
9	Oklahoma City Thunder	45	37	.549	22.0	82
10	Phoenix Suns	39	43	.476	28.0	82
11	Utah Jazz	38	44	.463	29.0	82
12	Denver Nuggets	30	52	.366	37.0	82
13	Sacramento Kings	29	53	.354	38.0	82
14	Los Angeles Lakers	21	61	.256	46.0	82
15	Minnesota Timberwolves	16	66	.195	51.0	82

== Game log ==
2014–15 game log
Total: 45–37 (home: 28–13; road: 17–24)
October: 1–0 (home: 1–0; road: 0–0)

Game	Date	Team	Score	High points	High rebounds	High assists	Location Attendance	Record
1	October 28	Orlando	W 101–84	Anthony Davis (26)	Anthony Davis (17)	Tyreke Evans (6)	Smoothie King Center; 17,097	1–0

November : 6–8 (home: 3–2; road: 3–6)

Game	Date	Team	Score	High points	High rebounds	High assists	Location Attendance	Record
2	November 1	Dallas	L 104–109	Anthony Davis (31)	Anthony Davis (15)	Tyreke Evans (9)	Smoothie King Center; 14,547	1–1
3	November 3	@ Memphis	L 81–93	Tyreke Evans (21)	Ryan Anderson (9)	Jrue Holiday (6)	FedExForum; 15,302	1–2
4	November 4	Charlotte	W 100–91	Anthony Davis (24)	Anthony Davis (13)	Jrue Holiday (9)	Smoothie King Center; 14,840	2–2
5	November 8	@ San Antonio	W 100–99	Anthony Davis (27)	Anthony Davis (11)	Jrue Holiday (11)	AT&T Center; 18,581	3–2
6	November 10	@ Cleveland	L 111–118	Ryan Anderson (32)	Anthony Davis (14)	Jrue Holiday (10)	Quicken Loans Arena; 20,562	3–3
7	November 12	L.A. Lakers	W 109–102	Anthony Davis (25)	Ömer Aşık (13)	Tyreke Evans (11)	Smoothie King Center; 17,359	4–3
8	November 14	Minnesota	W 139–91	Jrue Holiday (24)	Evans & Anderson (6)	Jrue Holiday (9)	Smoothie King Center; 14,775	5–3
9	November 17	@ Portland	L 93–102	Anthony Davis (31)	Anthony Davis (11)	Tyreke Evans (8)	Moda Center; 19,441	5–4
10	November 18	@ Sacramento	W 106–100	Anthony Davis (28)	Anthony Davis (9)	Jrue Holiday (9)	Sleep Train Arena; 16,526	6–4
11	November 21	@ Denver	L 97–117	Anthony Davis (18)	Anthony Davis (9)	Jrue Holiday (6)	Pepsi Center; 15,232	6–5
12	November 22	@ Utah	W 106–94	Anthony Davis (43)	Anthony Davis (14)	Jrue Holiday (9)	EnergySolutions Arena; 18,452	7–5
13	November 25	Sacramento	L 89–99	Tyreke Evans (22)	Anthony Davis (9)	Tyreke Evans (5)	Smoothie King Center; 17,037	7–6
14	November 28	@ Atlanta	L 91–100	Holiday & Anderson (20)	Davis & Aşık (11)	Jrue Holiday (7)	Philips Arena; 17,079	7–7
15	November 29	@ Washington	L 80–83	Anthony Davis (30)	Anthony Davis (13)	Tyreke Evans (4)	Verizon Center; 17,581	7–8

December : 9–8 (home: 6–2; road: 3–6)

Game	Date	Team	Score	High points	High rebounds	High assists	Location Attendance	Record
16	December 2	Oklahoma City	W 112–104	Tyreke Evans (30)	Ömer Aşık (14)	Jrue Holiday (10)	Smoothie King Center; 13,903	8–8
17	December 4	@ Golden State	L 85–112	Anthony Davis (30)	Davis & Aşık (15)	Jrue Holiday (8)	Oracle Arena; 19,596	8–9
18	December 6	@ L.A. Clippers	L 100–120	Anthony Davis (26)	Ömer Aşık (10)	Holiday, Mekel & Rivers (6)	STAPLES Center; 19,060	8–10
19	December 7	@ L.A. Lakers	W 104–87	Anthony Davis (23)	Ömer Aşık (11)	Jrue Holiday (8)	STAPLES Center; 18,997	9–10
20	December 9	New York	W 104–93	Tyreke Evans (27)	Ömer Aşık (14)	Jrue Holiday (7)	Smoothie King Center; 13,789	10–10
21	December 10	@ Dallas	L 107–112	Anthony Davis (31)	Ömer Aşık (15)	Jrue Holiday (10)	American Airlines Center; 19,988	10–11
22	December 12	Cleveland	W 119–114	Tyreke Evans (31)	Ömer Aşık (14)	Tyreke Evans (10)	Smoothie King Center; 18,069	11–11
23	December 14	Golden State	L 122–128 (OT)	Tyreke Evans (34)	Evans & Aşık (8)	Jrue Holiday (9)	Smoothie King Center; 15,037	11–12
24	December 16	Utah	W 119–111	Anthony Davis (31)	Anthony Davis (9)	Jrue Holiday (8)	Smoothie King Center; 13,179	12–12
25	December 18	@ Houston	W 99–90	Anthony Davis (30)	Anthony Davis (14)	Jrue Holiday (10)	Toyota Center; 18,317	13–12
26	December 20	Portland	L 88–114	Austin Rivers (21)	Alexis Ajinça (13)	Jrue Holiday (6)	Smoothie King Center; 16,079	13–13
27	December 21	@ Oklahoma City	W 101–99	Anthony Davis (38)	Davis & Aşık (12)	Jrue Holiday (15)	Chesapeake Energy Arena; 18,203	14–13
28	December 23	@ Indiana	L 84–96	Anthony Davis (21)	Tyreke Evans (10)	Jrue Holiday (5)	Bankers Life Fieldhouse; 17,336	14–14
29	December 26	San Antonio	W 97–90	Davis & Anderson (22)	Anthony Davis (21)	Jrue Holiday (7)	Smoothie King Center; 18,376	15–14
30	December 27	@ Chicago	L 100–107	Anthony Davis (29)	Anthony Davis (11)	Jrue Holiday (7)	United Center; 21,935	15–15
31	December 30	Phoenix	W 110–106	Tyreke Evans (24)	Anthony Davis (11)	Jrue Holiday (6)	Smoothie King Center; 16,364	16–15
32	December 31	@ San Antonio	L 93–95 (OT)	Anthony Davis (21)	Davis & Aşık (12)	Jrue Holiday (9)	AT&T Center; 18,581	16–16

January : 9–6 (home: 6–2; road: 3–4)

Game	Date	Team	Score	High points	High rebounds	High assists	Location Attendance	Record
33	January 2	Houston	W 111–83	Ryan Anderson (23)	Ömer Aşık (11)	Jrue Holiday (6)	Smoothie King Center; 17,705	17–16
34	January 5	Washington	L 85–92	Davis & Evans (21)	Anthony Davis (10)	Holiday & Gordon (6)	Smoothie King Center; 16,182	17–17
35	January 7	@ Charlotte	L 94–98	Anthony Davis (32)	Anthony Davis (12)	Jrue Holiday (9)	Time Warner Cable Arena; 15,171	17–18
36	January 9	Memphis	W 106–95	Jrue Holiday (23)	Anthony Davis (10)	Jrue Holiday (8)	Smoothie King Center; 17,639	18–18
37	January 12	@ Boston	L 100–108	Anthony Davis (34)	Ömer Aşık (12)	Anthony Davis (4)	TD Garden; 16,905	18–19
38	January 14	@ Detroit	W 105–94	Anthony Davis (27)	Ömer Aşık (13)	Tyreke Evans (9)	Palace of Auburn Hills; 12,016	19–19
39	January 16	@ Philadelphia	L 81–96	Ajinça & Gordon (16)	Ajinça & Aşık (14)	Tyreke Evans (6)	Wells Fargo Center; 15,672	19–20
40	January 18	@ Toronto	W 95–93	Tyreke Evans (26)	Ömer Aşık (9)	Evans & Gordon (5)	Air Canada Centre; 19,800	20–20
41	January 19	@ New York	L 92–99	Tyreke Evans (23)	Ömer Aşık (17)	Eric Gordon (5)	Madison Square Garden; 19,812	20–21
42	January 21	L.A. Lakers	W 96–80	Anthony Davis (29)	Ömer Aşık (10)	Eric Gordon (10)	Smoothie King Center; 16,268	21–21
43	January 23	@ Minnesota	W 92–84	Anthony Davis (21)	Anthony Davis (12)	Tyreke Evans (8)	Target Center; 14,978	22–21
44	January 25	Dallas	W 109–106	Anthony Davis (28)	Ömer Aşık (11)	Tyreke Evans (12)	Smoothie King Center; 17,687	23–21
45	January 26	Philadelphia	W 99–74	Anthony Davis (32)	Anthony Davis (10)	Tyreke Evans (12)	Smoothie King Center; 16,419	24–21
46	January 28	Denver	L 85–93	Tyreke Evans (25)	Davis & Aşık (12)	Eric Gordon (6)	Smoothie King Center; 16,055	24–22
47	January 30	L.A. Clippers	W 108–103	Eric Gordon (28)	Dante Cunningham (12)	Tyreke Evans (12)	Smoothie King Center; 17,932	25–22

February : 6–5 (home: 4–4; road: 2–1)

Game	Date	Team	Score	High points	High rebounds	High assists	Location Attendance	Record
48	February 2	Atlanta	W 115–100	Anthony Davis (29)	Ömer Aşık (17)	Tyreke Evans (12)	Smoothie King Center; 15,487	26–22
49	February 4	Oklahoma City	L 91–102	Anthony Davis (23)	Anthony Davis (8)	Evans & Gordon (7)	Smoothie King Center; 17,156	26–23
50	February 6	@ Oklahoma City	W 116–113	Anthony Davis (41)	Davis & Evans (10)	Tyreke Evans (16)	Chesapeake Energy Arena; 18,203	27–23
51	February 7	Chicago	L 72–107	Tyreke Evans (15)	Ömer Aşık (7)	Eric Gordon (4)	Smoothie King Center; 18,402	27–24
52	February 9	Utah	L 96–100	Eric Gordon (31)	Ömer Aşık (8)	Tyreke Evans (10)	Smoothie King Center; 15,321	27–25
53	February 11	Indiana	L 93–106	Luke Babbitt (15)	Babbitt & Aşık (8)	Tyreke Evans (6)	Smoothie King Center; 17,074	27–26
All-Star Break
54	February 20	@ Orlando	L 84–95	Tyreke Evans (14)	Anthony Davis (11)	Tyreke Evans (10)	Amway Center; 18,259	27–27
55	February 21	@ Miami	W 105–91	Eric Gordon (24)	Ömer Aşık (9)	Gordon & Evans (6)	American Airlines Arena; 19,982	28–27
56	February 23	Toronto	W 100–97	Luke Babbitt (18)	Ömer Aşık (11)	Tyreke Evans (12)	Smoothie King Center; 16,514	29–27
57	February 25	Brooklyn	W 102–96	Quincy Pondexter (25)	Ömer Aşık (13)	Tyreke Evans (11)	Smoothie King Center; 16,097	30–27
58	February 27	Miami	W 104–102	Alexis Ajinça (24)	Cunningham & Aşık (10)	Tyreke Evans (11)	Smoothie King Center; 17,797	31–27

March : 8–7 (home: 5–3; road: 3–4)

Game	Date	Team	Score	High points	High rebounds	High assists	Location Attendance	Record
59	March 1	@ Denver	W 99–92	Tyreke Evans (22)	Ömer Aşık (16)	Tyreke Evans (7)	Pepsi Center; 13,109	32–27
60	March 2	@ Dallas	L 93–102	Norris Cole (19)	Alexis Ajinça (12)	Tyreke Evans (7)	American Airlines Center; 20,367	32–28
61	March 4	Detroit	W 88–85	Anthony Davis (39)	Anthony Davis (13)	Tyreke Evans (9)	Smoothie King Center; 16,925	33–28
62	March 6	Boston	L 98–104	Anthony Davis (29)	Anthony Davis (14)	Tyreke Evans (5)	Smoothie King Center; 17,274	33–29
63	March 7	Memphis	W 95–89	Tyreke Evans (26)	Ömer Aşık (11)	Pondexter & Evans (7)	Smoothie King Center; 17,346	34–29
64	March 9	@ Milwaukee	W 114–103	Anthony Davis (43)	Anthony Davis (10)	Davis & Evans (6)	BMO Harris Bradley Center; 12,218	35–29
65	March 10	@ Brooklyn	W 111–91	Pondexter & Ajinça (17)	Ömer Aşık (15)	Eric Gordon (7)	Barclays Center; 16,422	36–29
66	March 15	Denver	L 111–118 (2OT)	Anthony Davis (36)	Anthony Davis (14)	Tyreke Evans (10)	Smoothie King Center; 17,248	36–30
67	March 17	Milwaukee	W 85–84	Anthony Davis (20)	Anthony Davis (12)	Eric Gordon (7)	Smoothie King Center; 17,881	37–30
68	March 19	@ Phoenix	L 72–74	Eric Gordon (14)	Ömer Aşık (14)	Eric Gordon (5)	US Airways Center; 18,055	37–31
69	March 20	@ Golden State	L 96–112	Norris Cole (19)	Withey & Ajinça (8)	Cole & Evans (4)	Oracle Arena; 19,596	37–32
70	March 22	@ L.A. Clippers	L 100–107	Anthony Davis (26)	Anthony Davis (12)	Davis & Gordon (5)	Staples Center; 19,299	37–33
71	March 25	Houston	L 93–95	Tyreke Evans (28)	Anthony Davis (14)	Tyreke Evans (7)	Smoothie King Center; 17,077	37–34
72	March 27	Sacramento	W 102–88	Tyreke Evans (25)	Ömer Aşık (12)	Tyreke Evans (10)	Smoothie King Center; 17,669	38–34
73	March 29	Minnesota	W 110–88	Anthony Davis (28)	Anthony Davis (9)	Eric Gordon (7)	Smoothie King Center; 17,576	39–34

April : 6–3 (home: 3–0; road: 3–3)

Game	Date	Team	Score	High points	High rebounds	High assists	Location Attendance	Record
74	April 1	@ L.A. Lakers	W 113–92	Anthony Davis (20)	Ömer Aşık (10)	Tyreke Evans (8)	Staples Center; 17,165	40–34
75	April 3	@ Sacramento	W 101–95	Eric Gordon (21)	Tyreke Evans (12)	Tyreke Evans (9)	Sleep Train Arena; 17,021	41–34
76	April 4	@ Portland	L 90–99	Eric Gordon (22)	Anthony Davis (9)	Tyreke Evans (9)	Moda Center; 19,781	41–35
77	April 7	Golden State	W 103–100	Anthony Davis (29)	Aşık & Davis (10)	Tyreke Evans (9)	Smoothie King Center; 18,097	42–35
78	April 8	@ Memphis	L 74–110	Anthony Davis (12)	Dante Cunningham (10)	Evans & Gordon & Pondexter (3)	FedExForum; 17,518	42–36
79	April 10	Phoenix	W 90–75	Anthony Davis (19)	Ömer Aşık (18)	Cole & Evans (6)	Smoothie King Center; 17,954	43–36
80	April 12	@ Houston	L 114–121	Anthony Davis (27)	Ömer Aşık (10)	Tyreke Evans (8)	Toyota Center; 18,318	43–37
81	April 13	@ Minnesota	W 100–88	Anthony Davis (24)	Anthony Davis (11)	Davis & Evans (5)	Target Center; 13,009	44–37
82	April 15	San Antonio	W 108–103	Anthony Davis (31)	Anthony Davis (13)	Tyreke Evans (11)	Smoothie King Center; 18,524	45–37

2014–15 season schedule

== Playoffs ==
=== Game log ===
2015 playoff game log
Total: 0–4 (home: 0–2; road: 0–2)
First Round: 0–4 (home: 0–2; road: 0–2)

Game	Date	Team	Score	High points	High rebounds	High assists	Location Attendance	Series
1	April 18	@ Golden State	L 99–106	Anthony Davis (35)	Aşık & Pondexter (9)	Cole & Pondexter (6)	Oracle Arena; 19,596	0–1
2	April 20	@ Golden State	L 87–97	Anthony Davis (29)	Ömer Aşık (14)	Tyreke Evans (7)	Oracle Arena; 19,596	0–2
3	April 23	Golden State	L 119–123 (OT)	Anthony Davis (29)	Anthony Davis (15)	Tyreke Evans (8)	Smoothie King Center; 18,444	0–3
4	April 25	Golden State	L 98–109	Anthony Davis (36)	Anthony Davis (11)	Gordon, Evans (5)	Smoothie King Center; 18,443	0–4

2015 playoff schedule

== Player statistics ==
Legend
GP	Games played	GS	Games started	MPG	Minutes per game
FG%	Field-goal percentage	3P%	3-point field-goal percentage	FT%	Free-throw percentage
RPG	Rebounds per game	APG	Assists per game	SPG	Steals per game
BPG	Blocks per game	PPG	Points per game

=== Regular season ===
New Orleans Pelicans statistics
Player	GP	GS	MPG	FG%	3P%	FT%	RPG	APG	SPG	BPG	PPG
Tyreke Evans	79	76	34.1	.447	.304	.694	5.3	6.6	1.3	.5	16.6
Ömer Aşık	76	76	26.1	.517		.582	9.8	.9	.4	.7	7.3
Anthony Davis	68	68	36.1	.535	.083	.805	10.2	2.2	1.5	2.9	24.4
Alexis Ajinça	68	8	14.1	.550		.818	4.6	.7	.3	.8	6.5
Dante Cunningham	66	27	25.0	.457	.100	.617	3.9	.8	.7	.6	5.2
Luke Babbitt	63	19	13.2	.479	.513	.684	1.8	.4	.3	.2	4.1
Eric Gordon	61	60	33.1	.411	.448	.805	2.6	3.8	.8	.2	13.4
Ryan Anderson	61	5	27.5	.399	.340	.854	4.8	.9	.5	.3	13.7
Jimmer Fredette	50	0	10.2	.380	.188	.956	.8	1.2	.3	.0	3.6
Quincy Pondexter^{†}	45	28	27.8	.449	.433	.758	3.1	1.5	.3	.4	9.0
Jrue Holiday	40	37	32.6	.446	.378	.855	3.4	6.9	1.6	.6	14.8
Jeff Withey	37	0	7.0	.500		.680	1.7	.3	.1	.5	2.6
Austin Rivers^{†}	35	3	22.1	.387	.280	.746	1.9	2.5	.5	.2	6.8
Norris Cole^{†}	28	2	24.4	.444	.378	.743	1.8	3.2	.5	.3	9.9
John Salmons	21	0	12.9	.333	.308	.500	1.0	.6	.4	.2	2.0
Toney Douglas	12	0	14.8	.373	.278	.615	1.8	2.0	.9	.3	4.3
Nate Wolters^{†}	10	0	10.5	.308	.000	.500	1.8	1.1	.3	.2	1.7
Elliot Williams^{†}	8	0	9.6	.333	.273	.000	.6	1.0	.3	.0	2.4
Russ Smith^{†}	6	0	4.8	.200	.167		.5	.3	.0	.0	.8
Darius Miller	5	1	8.6	.143	.000		.2	.4	.2	.0	.4
Gal Mekel	4	0	10.8	.150	.000		.3	3.3	.5	.0	1.5

=== Playoffs ===
New Orleans Pelicans statistics
Player	GP	GS	MPG	FG%	3P%	FT%	RPG	APG	SPG	BPG	PPG
Anthony Davis	4	4	43.0	.540	.000	.889	11.0	2.0	1.3	3.0	31.5
Eric Gordon	4	4	35.8	.438	.406	.833	2.5	3.8	.5	.5	18.5
Tyreke Evans	4	4	31.3	.326	.182	.588	5.0	5.0	1.3	.3	10.0
Quincy Pondexter	4	4	31.0	.357	.300	.857	5.0	3.0	1.8	.0	7.3
Ömer Aşık	4	4	19.8	.200		.571	7.3	1.5	1.3	.0	2.0
Norris Cole	4	0	26.5	.417	.214	.667	1.8	1.8	.0	.3	8.8
Ryan Anderson	4	0	23.8	.444	.417	1.000	4.3	2.3	.0	.5	10.8
Dante Cunningham	4	0	18.8	.818		1.000	4.5	.5	.8	1.0	5.3
Jrue Holiday	3	0	18.3	.368	.250	1.000	1.0	4.3	.7	.3	6.3
Alexis Ajinça	3	0	3.3	1.000			.3	.3	.3	.0	2.7

- ^{†} Denotes player spent time with another team in the season. Stats reflect time with the Pelicans only.

== Injuries ==
Player	Duration		Injury type	Games missed
Player	Start	End	Injury type	Games missed

== Roster ==
2014–15 New Orleans Pelicans roster
Players

Pos.	No.	Player	Height	Weight	DOB	From
C	42	Alexis Ajinça	7 ft 2 in (2.18 m)	248 lb (112 kg)	1988-05-06	France
PF	33	Ryan Anderson	6 ft 10 in (2.08 m)	240 lb (109 kg)	1988-05-06	California
C	3	Ömer Aşık	7 ft 0 in (2.13 m)	255 lb (116 kg)	1986-07-04	Turkey
SF	8	Luke Babbitt	6 ft 9 in (2.06 m)	225 lb (102 kg)	1989-06-20	Nevada
PG	30	Norris Cole	6 ft 2 in (1.88 m)	175 lb (79 kg)	1988-10-13	Cleveland State
PF	44	Dante Cunningham	6 ft 8 in (2.03 m)	221 lb (100 kg)	1987-04-22	Villanova
PF	23	Anthony Davis	6 ft 10 in (2.08 m)	220 lb (100 kg)	1993-03-11	Kentucky
SG	16	Toney Douglas	6 ft 2 in (1.88 m)	185 lb (84 kg)	1986-03-16	Florida State
SG	1	Tyreke Evans	6 ft 6 in (1.98 m)	220 lb (100 kg)	1989-09-19	Memphis
PG	32	Jimmer Fredette	6 ft 2 in (1.88 m)	195 lb (88 kg)	1989-02-25	BYU
SG	10	Eric Gordon	6 ft 4 in (1.93 m)	215 lb (98 kg)	1988-12-25	Indiana
PG	11	Jrue Holiday	6 ft 4 in (1.93 m)	205 lb (93 kg)	1990-06-12	UCLA
SF	20	Quincy Pondexter	6 ft 6 in (1.98 m)	225 lb (102 kg)	1988-03-10	Washington
C	5	Jeff Withey	7 ft 0 in (2.13 m)	235 lb (107 kg)	1990-03-07	Kansas

Coaches
Head coach
- Monty Williams
Assistant(s)
- Randy Ayers
- Dave Hanners
- Bryan Gates
- Fred Vinson
- Kevin Hanson
- Carlos Daniel (player development)
- Duane Brooks (trainer)

Legend
- (DP) Unsigned draft pick
- (FA) Free agent
- (S) Suspended
- (DL) On assignment to D-League affiliate
- Injured

Roster
Updated: March 24, 2015

== Transactions ==
=== Trades ===
July 15, 2014	To New Orleans Pelicans Ömer Aşık (From Houston); Omri Casspi (From Houston); Cash (From Houston) To Washington Wizards Melvin Ely (From New Orleans); Trade exception (From Houston)	To Houston Rockets Trevor Ariza (From Washington); Alonzo Gee (From New Orleans); Scotty Hopson (From New Orleans); 2015 first-round pick

=== Free agents ===
==== Re-signed ====
Player	Signed	Contract	Ref.

==== Additions ====
Player	Signed	Former team	Ref.

==== Subtractions ====
Player	Reason left	Date	New team	Ref.

== Awards ==
Player	Award	Date awarded	Ref.
