= 2014–15 Golden State Warriors season =

Professional basketball team season (won NBA championship)

- NBA champions
- Conference champions
- Division champions
- Head coach: Steve Kerr
- General manager: Bob Myers
- Owners: Peter Guber; Joe Lacob
- Arena: Oracle Arena

Results
- Record: 67–15 (.817)
- Place: Division: 1st (Pacific); Conference: 1st (Western)
- Playoff finish: NBA champions (Defeated Cavaliers 4–2)
- Stats at Basketball Reference

Local media
- Television: Comcast SportsNet Bay Area
- Radio: KNBR

The 2014–15 Golden State Warriors season was the 69th season of the franchise in the National Basketball Association (NBA), and their 53rd in the San Francisco Bay Area. On May 14, 2014, the Warriors hired Steve Kerr to a five-year, $25 million deal to become the team's new head coach, succeeding Mark Jackson, who was fired eight days earlier. It was the first head coaching job for Kerr, with a prior NBA background as a five-time NBA champion guard who set an all-time career record for accuracy in three-point shooting (.454). Kerr's extensive background experience also entailed his service as president and general manager for the Phoenix Suns basketball team from 2007 to 2010 and operating as an NBA broadcast analyst for Turner Network Television (TNT). The team also signed point guard Shaun Livingston and guard Leandro Barbosa during the offseason.

Under Kerr's first year at the helm, the Warriors won their first five games before going on a 16-game winning streak from November 13 to December 14, to shoot the record to a 21–2 start to the season, their best start in franchise history at the time. On January 21, the team established a new franchise record of 17 straight home wins, extending the record to 19 before losing to Derrick Rose-led Chicago Bulls on January 27. With their win against the Portland Trail Blazers on March 24, they clinched the Pacific Division for the first time since the 1975–76 season, also tying the franchise record for road wins in a season with 24. On March 28, the Warriors won their 60th game and clinched the best record in the Western Conference and set a franchise record for regular season wins, surpassing the previous win of 59 games set by them during the 1975–76 season.

In what would ultimately turn out to be the Warriors' breakout season, the team finished the 2014–15 regular season garnering a league-best record of 67–15. They became the tenth NBA team to win 67 games in a season and finished with a home record of 39–2, the second-best in NBA history, alongside a road record of 28–13. The Warriors also ranked first in defensive efficiency for the season and second in offensive efficiency, barely missing the mark that the Julius Erving-led Sixers achieved by being first in both categories. On May 4, 2015, Stephen Curry was named the 2014–15 NBA Most Valuable Player, the first Warrior since Wilt Chamberlain in 1960 to be bestowed with the honor.

In the playoffs, the Warriors swept the Anthony Davis-led New Orleans Pelicans in the first round of the playoffs, dismantled the Marc Gasol-led Memphis Grizzlies in six games in the second round, and dispatched the James Harden-led Houston Rockets in five games in the Western Conference Finals. The team advanced to their first NBA Finals since 1975, finding themselves pitted up against the LeBron James-led Cleveland Cavaliers. In the ensuing years of the Warriors' successive reign in establishing themselves as the NBA's most dominant force, the Cavaliers emerged as their perennial opponents in each of the subsequent three successive NBA Finals, sparking a fiercely contested league rivalry that developed and lasted between the two teams over the next 3 Finals series matchups. After Golden State fell behind 2–1 in the series, head coach Steve Kerr gave swingman Andre Iguodala his first start of the season, replacing center Andrew Bogut in Game 4. The Warriors' small lineup (which came to be known as the Death Lineup) helped turn the series around. The Warriors won the last three games and the series in six, winning their first NBA championship title in 40 years and their fourth in franchise history. Iguodala was named Finals MVP, becoming the first player in NBA history to win the award without starting a single regular season game.

The team registered a grand total of 83 victories throughout the season, a commendable achievement that ranks as the third highest in NBA history where they went an aggregate total of 83–20 encompassing both regular season and playoff matches. Moreover, Kerr became the first rookie head coach to win an NBA title since Pat Riley during the 1981–82 season.

Numerous Warriors players set individual records over the course of the season. Stephen Curry won the NBA Most Valuable Player Award, the first Warriors player to win since Wilt Chamberlain in the 1959–60 NBA season, when the franchise was still located in Philadelphia. He also broke his own NBA record for made three-pointers in a season of 272, finishing with 286. On January 23, 2015, Klay Thompson broke the NBA record for most points scored in a quarter with 37, finishing the game with a career high 52 points. Head Coach Steve Kerr's 67 wins with the Warriors set the NBA record for most wins by a rookie head coach. Curry and Thompson, dubbed the "Splash Brothers", broke the single-season record for most three-pointers made by a pair of teammates. Both also made the All-Star team, Curry as a starter and Thompson as a reserve. Together, they sank 525 three-pointers over the course of the season, smashing the prior NBA record of 484 set by themselves during the 2013–14 season.

== Draft ==
The Warriors did not have a pick in the 2014 NBA draft.

== Preseason ==
2014 pre-season game log
Total: 6–2 (Home: 3–0; Road: 3–2)
Pre-season: 6–2 (home: 3–0; road: 3–2)

Game	Date	Team	Score	High points	High rebounds	High assists	Location Attendance	Record
1	October 7	@ L.A. Clippers	W 112–94	Klay Thompson (20)	David Lee (9)	5 players tied (3)	Staples Center; 13,958	1–0
2	October 9	@ L.A. Lakers	W 120–105	Klay Thompson (25)	Andrew Bogut (6)	Stephen Curry (6)	Staples Center; 13,128	2–0
3	October 12	@ L.A. Lakers	W 116–75	Stephen Curry (25)	Andrew Bogut (7)	Andre Iguodala (8)	Citizens Business Bank Arena; 7,842	3–0
4	October 16	Denver	W 104–101	James Michael McAdoo (20)	James Michael McAdoo (7)	Klay Thompson (5)	Wells Fargo Arena; 11,105	4–0
5	October 17	@ Miami	L 108–115	Klay Thompson (29)	David Lee (6)	Bogut, Curry (7)	Sprint Center; 12,783	4–1
6	October 19	@ Houston	L 83–90	Justin Holiday (18)	Aaron Craft (7)	Nemanja Nedovic (5)	State Farm Arena; 5,647	4–2
7	October 21	L.A. Clippers	W 125–107	Stephen Curry (27)	Ognjen Kuzmic (10)	Curry, Green (6)	Oracle Arena; 19,596	5–2
8	October 24	Denver	W 119–112	Klay Thompson (35)	Andrew Bogut (8)	Stephen Curry (11)	Oracle Arena; 19,596	6–2

2014–15 season schedule

== Regular season ==
=== Standings ===
==== By Division ====
Pacific Division	W	L	PCT	GB	Home	Road	Div	GP
z-Golden State Warriors	67	15	.817	–	39‍–‍2	28‍–‍13	13–3	82
x-Los Angeles Clippers	56	26	.683	11.0	30‍–‍11	26‍–‍15	12–4	82
Phoenix Suns	39	43	.476	28.0	22‍–‍19	17‍–‍24	6–10	82
Sacramento Kings	29	53	.354	38.0	18‍–‍23	11‍–‍30	7–9	82
Los Angeles Lakers	21	61	.256	46.0	12‍–‍29	9‍–‍32	2–14	82

==== By Conference ====
Western Conference
#	Team	W	L	PCT	GB	GP
1	z-Golden State Warriors *	67	15	.817	–	82
2	y-Houston Rockets *	56	26	.683	11.0	82
3	x-Los Angeles Clippers	56	26	.683	11.0	82
4	y-Portland Trail Blazers *	51	31	.622	16.0	82
5	x-Memphis Grizzlies	55	27	.671	12.0	82
6	x-San Antonio Spurs	55	27	.671	12.0	82
7	x-Dallas Mavericks	50	32	.610	17.0	82
8	x-New Orleans Pelicans	45	37	.549	22.0	82
9	Oklahoma City Thunder	45	37	.549	22.0	82
10	Phoenix Suns	39	43	.476	28.0	82
11	Utah Jazz	38	44	.463	29.0	82
12	Denver Nuggets	30	52	.366	37.0	82
13	Sacramento Kings	29	53	.354	38.0	82
14	Los Angeles Lakers	21	61	.256	46.0	82
15	Minnesota Timberwolves	16	66	.195	51.0	82

=== Game log ===
2014–15 game log
Total: 67–15 (Home: 39–2; Road: 28–13)
October: 1–0 (home: 0–0; road: 1–0)

Game	Date	Team	Score	High points	High rebounds	High assists	Location Attendance	Record
1	October 29	@ Sacramento	W 95–77	Stephen Curry (24)	Stephen Curry (10)	Klay Thompson (6)	Sleep Train Arena; 17,317	1–0

November : 13–2 (home: 5–1; road: 8–1)

Game	Date	Team	Score	High points	High rebounds	High assists	Location Attendance	Record
2	November 1	L.A. Lakers	W 127–104	Klay Thompson (41)	Andrew Bogut (10)	Stephen Curry (10)	Oracle Arena; 19,596	2–0
3	November 2	@ Portland	W 95–90	Klay Thompson (29)	Andrew Bogut (12)	Stephen Curry (6)	Moda Center; 19,441	3–0
4	November 5	L.A. Clippers	W 121–104	Stephen Curry (28)	Andrew Bogut (14)	Stephen Curry (7)	Oracle Arena; 19,596	4–0
5	November 8	@ Houston	W 98–87	Stephen Curry (34)	Stephen Curry (10)	Klay Thompson (6)	Toyota Center; 18,023	5–0
6	November 9	@ Phoenix	L 95–107	Stephen Curry (28)	Draymond Green (9)	Stephen Curry (10)	US Airways Center; 18,422	5–1
7	November 11	San Antonio	L 100–113	Klay Thompson (29)	Harrison Barnes (8)	Stephen Curry (5)	Oracle Arena; 19,596	5–2
8	November 13	Brooklyn	W 107–99	Klay Thompson (25)	Andrew Bogut (14)	Draymond Green (7)	Oracle Arena; 19,596	6–2
9	November 15	Charlotte	W 112–87	Klay Thompson (21)	Andrew Bogut (9)	Stephen Curry (9)	Oracle Arena; 19,596	7–2
10	November 16	@ L.A. Lakers	W 136–115	Stephen Curry (30)	Andrew Bogut (10)	Stephen Curry (15)	STAPLES Center; 19,060	8–2
11	November 21	Utah	W 101–88	Andre Iguodala (17)	Harrison Barnes (11)	Stephen Curry (10)	Oracle Arena; 19,596	9–2
12	November 23	@ Oklahoma City	W 91–86	Marreese Speights (28)	Draymond Green (9)	Curry, Green (6)	Chesapeake Energy Arena; 18,203	10–2
13	November 25	@ Miami	W 114–97	Stephen Curry (40)	Andrew Bogut (10)	Stephen Curry (7)	American Airlines Arena; 19,647	11–2
14	November 26	@ Orlando	W 111–96	Stephen Curry (28)	Andrew Bogut (12)	Stephen Curry (8)	Amway Center; 17,702	12–2
15	November 28	@ Charlotte	W 106–101	Marreese Speights (27)	Draymond Green (10)	Stephen Curry (6)	Time Warner Cable Arena; 19,381	13–2
16	November 30	@ Detroit	W 104–93	Draymond Green (20)	Marreese Speights (12)	Stephen Curry (10)	The Palace of Auburn Hills; 12,737	14–2

December : 11–3 (home: 7–0; road: 4–3)

Game	Date	Team	Score	High points	High rebounds	High assists	Location Attendance	Record
17	December 2	Orlando	W 98–97	Stephen Curry (22)	Bogut, Barnes (12)	Draymond Green (6)	Oracle Arena; 19,596	15–2
18	December 4	New Orleans	W 112–85	Klay Thompson (23)	Draymond Green (14)	Stephen Curry (11)	Oracle Arena; 19,596	16–2
19	December 6	@ Chicago	W 112–102	Draymond Green (31)	Andrew Bogut (12)	Stephen Curry (7)	United Center; 22,353	17–2
20	December 8	@ Minnesota	W 102–86	Curry, Thompson (21)	Draymond Green (10)	Stephen Curry (7)	Target Center; 10,296	18–2
21	December 10	Houston	W 105–93	Klay Thompson (21)	Green, Speights (8)	Stephen Curry (7)	Oracle Arena; 19,596	19–2
22	December 13	@ Dallas	W 105–98	Stephen Curry (29)	Harrison Barnes (9)	Stephen Curry (8)	American Airlines Center; 20,317	20–2
23	December 14	@ New Orleans	W 128–122 (OT)	Stephen Curry (34)	Draymond Green (13)	Stephen Curry (7)	Smoothie King Center; 15,037	21–2
24	December 16	@ Memphis	L 98–105	Klay Thompson (22)	Draymond Green (10)	Curry, Green (6)	FedExForum; 18,119	21–3
25	December 18	Oklahoma City	W 114–109	Stephen Curry (34)	Draymond Green (9)	Curry, Green (9)	Oracle Arena; 19,596	22–3
26	December 22	Sacramento	W 128–108	Klay Thompson (25)	Barnes, Green (8)	Stephen Curry (11)	Oracle Arena; 19,596	23–3
27	December 23	@ L.A. Lakers	L 105–115	Stephen Curry (22)	David Lee (7)	Stephen Curry (6)	Staples Center; 19,540	23–4
28	December 25	@ L.A. Clippers	L 86–100	Klay Thompson (15)	Harrison Barnes (13)	Stephen Curry (7)	Staples Center; 19,540	23–5
29	December 27	Minnesota	W 110–97	Stephen Curry (25)	Draymond Green (8)	Curry, Green (6)	Oracle Arena; 19,596	24–5
30	December 30	Philadelphia	W 126–86	Marreese Speights (23)	Draymond Green (10)	Stephen Curry (9)	Oracle Arena; 19,596	25–5

January : 12–3 (home: 10–1; road: 2–2)

Game	Date	Team	Score	High points	High rebounds	High assists	Location Attendance	Record
31	January 2	Toronto	W 126–105	Stephen Curry (32)	Draymond Green (11)	Draymond Green (13)	Oracle Arena; 19,596	26–5
32	January 5	Oklahoma City	W 117–91	Harrison Barnes (23)	Draymond Green (13)	Curry, Iguodala (6)	Oracle Arena; 19,596	27–5
33	January 7	Indiana	W 117–102	Klay Thompson (40)	Draymond Green (9)	Stephen Curry (15)	Oracle Arena; 19,596	28–5
34	January 9	Cleveland	W 112–94	Klay Thompson (24)	Draymond Green (11)	Stephen Curry (10)	Oracle Arena; 19,596	29–5
35	January 13	@ Utah	W 116–105	Stephen Curry (27)	Bogut, Lee (8)	Stephen Curry (11)	EnergySolutions Arena; 19,911	30–5
36	January 14	Miami	W 104–89	Stephen Curry (32)	Lee, Speights (6)	Andre Iguodala (7)	Oracle Arena; 19,596	31–5
37	January 16	@ Oklahoma City	L 115–127	Klay Thompson (32)	Draymond Green (9)	Stephen Curry (6)	Chesapeake Energy Arena; 18,203	31–6
38	January 17	@ Houston	W 131–106	Curry, Thompson (27)	David Lee (8)	Stephen Curry (11)	Toyota Center; 18,458	32–6
39	January 19	Denver	W 122–79	Klay Thompson (22)	David Lee (10)	Stephen Curry (8)	Oracle Arena; 19,596	33–6
40	January 21	Houston	W 126–113	Klay Thompson (27)	Bogut, Lee (10)	Stephen Curry (10)	Oracle Arena; 19,596	34–6
41	January 23	Sacramento	W 126–101	Klay Thompson (52)	David Lee (9)	Stephen Curry (11)	Oracle Arena; 19,596	35–6
42	January 25	Boston	W 114–111	Klay Thompson (31)	Andrew Bogut (13)	Stephen Curry (11)	Oracle Arena; 19,596	36–6
43	January 27	Chicago	L 111–113 (OT)	Klay Thompson (30)	Klay Thompson (10)	Stephen Curry (9)	Oracle Arena; 19,596	36–7
44	January 30	@ Utah	L 100–110	Stephen Curry (32)	Marreese Speights (8)	Stephen Curry (6)	EnergySolutions Arena; 19,295	36–8
45	January 31	Phoenix	W 106–87	Stephen Curry (25)	Draymond Green (11)	Stephen Curry (7)	Oracle Arena; 19,596	37–8

February : 8–3 (home: 2–0; road: 6–3)

Game	Date	Team	Score	High points	High rebounds	High assists	Location Attendance	Record
46	February 3	@ Sacramento	W 121–96	Stephen Curry (23)	Marreese Speights (8)	Stephen Curry (9)	Sleep Train Arena; 17,317	38–8
47	February 4	Dallas	W 128–114	Stephen Curry (51)	Draymond Green (10)	Draymond Green (6)	Oracle Arena; 19,596	39–8
48	February 6	@ Atlanta	L 116–124	Klay Thompson (29)	Draymond Green (20)	Stephen Curry (9)	Philips Arena; 19,225	39–9
49	February 7	@ New York	W 106–92	Stephen Curry (22)	Draymond Green (13)	David Lee (5)	Madison Square Garden; 19,812	40–9
50	February 9	@ Philadelphia	W 89–84	Stephen Curry (20)	Andrew Bogut (9)	Stephen Curry (6)	Wells Fargo Center; 16,247	41–9
51	February 11	@ Minnesota	W 97–94	Stephen Curry (25)	Draymond Green (13)	Stephen Curry (8)	Target Center; 14,303	42–9
All-Star Break
52	February 20	San Antonio	W 110–99	Stephen Curry (25)	3 players tied (6)	Stephen Curry (11)	Oracle Arena; 19,596	43–9
53	February 22	@ Indiana	L 98–104	Klay Thompson (39)	David Lee (12)	Bogut, Iguodala (4)	Bankers Life Fieldhouse; 17,789	43–10
54	February 24	@ Washington	W 114–107	Stephen Curry (32)	David Lee (10)	Stephen Curry (8)	Verizon Center; 20,356	44–10
55	February 26	@ Cleveland	L 99–110	David Lee (19)	Draymond Green (8)	Stephen Curry (6)	Quicken Loans Arena; 20,562	44–11
56	February 27	@ Toronto	W 113–89	Klay Thompson (25)	Draymond Green (9)	Shaun Livingston (8)	Air Canada Centre; 19,800	45–11

March : 16–2 (home: 10–0; road: 6–2)

Game	Date	Team	Score	High points	High rebounds	High assists	Location Attendance	Record
57	March 1	@ Boston	W 106–101	Stephen Curry (37)	Draymond Green (11)	Stephen Curry (5)	TD Garden; 18,624	46–11
58	March 2	@ Brooklyn	L 108–110	Stephen Curry (26)	Draymond Green (11)	Stephen Curry (7)	Barclays Center; 17,732	46–12
59	March 4	Milwaukee	W 102–93	Draymond Green (23)	Draymond Green (12)	Stephen Curry (11)	Oracle Arena; 19,596	47–12
60	March 6	Dallas	W 104–89	Stephen Curry (22)	Andrew Bogut (13)	Stephen Curry (7)	Oracle Arena; 19,596	48–12
61	March 8	L.A. Clippers	W 106–98	Draymond Green (23)	Barnes, Livingston (8)	Draymond Green (6)	Oracle Arena; 19,596	49–12
62	March 9	@ Phoenix	W 98–80	Stephen Curry (36)	Draymond Green (10)	Stephen Curry (5)	US Airways Center; 18,055	50–12
63	March 11	Detroit	W 105–98	Klay Thompson (27)	Green, Iguodala (7)	Stephen Curry (11)	Oracle Arena; 19,596	51–12
64	March 13	@ Denver	L 103–114	Justin Holiday (23)	3 players tied (6)	Shaun Livingston (8)	Pepsi Center; 19,155	51–13
65	March 14	New York	W 125–94	Klay Thompson (27)	Draymond Green (7)	Stephen Curry (11)	Oracle Arena; 19,596	52–13
66	March 16	L.A. Lakers	W 108–105	Klay Thompson (26)	Draymond Green (8)	Stephen Curry (9)	Oracle Arena; 19,596	53–13
67	March 18	Atlanta	W 114–95	Harrison Barnes (25)	Andrew Bogut (14)	Stephen Curry (12)	Oracle Arena; 19,596	54–13
68	March 20	New Orleans	W 112–96	Harrison Barnes (22)	Draymond Green (8)	Stephen Curry (11)	Oracle Arena; 19,596	55–13
69	March 21	Utah	W 106–91	Stephen Curry (24)	Andrew Bogut (8)	Draymond Green (7)	Oracle Arena; 19,596	56–13
70	March 23	Washington	W 107–76	Stephen Curry (24)	Andrew Bogut (12)	Stephen Curry (6)	Oracle Arena; 19,596	57–13
71	March 24	@ Portland	W 122–108	Stephen Curry (33)	Andrew Bogut (16)	Stephen Curry (10)	Moda Center; 19,985	58–13
72	March 27	@ Memphis	W 107–84	Stephen Curry (38)	Bogut, Ezeli (8)	Stephen Curry (10)	FedExForum; 18,119	59–13
73	March 28	@ Milwaukee	W 108–95	Stephen Curry (25)	Marreese Speights (7)	Shaun Livingston (8)	BMO Harris Bradley Center; 18,717	60–13
74	March 31	@ L.A. Clippers	W 110–106	Stephen Curry (27)	Andrew Bogut (9)	Andre Iguodala (7)	Staples Center; 19,601	61–13

April: 6–2 (home: 5–0; road: 1–2)

Game	Date	Team	Score	High points	High rebounds	High assists	Location Attendance	Record
75	April 2	Phoenix	W 107–106	Stephen Curry (28)	Andrew Bogut (9)	Klay Thompson (6)	Oracle Arena; 19,596	62–13
76	April 4	@ Dallas	W 123–110	Klay Thompson (21)	Andrew Bogut (11)	Shaun Livingston (5)	American Airlines Center; 20,407	63–13
77	April 5	@ San Antonio	L 92–107	Stephen Curry (24)	Bogut, Green (7)	Curry, Green (6)	AT&T Center; 18,581	63–14
78	April 7	@ New Orleans	L 100–103	Stephen Curry (25)	Draymond Green (14)	Stephen Curry (9)	Smoothie King Center; 18,097	63–15
79	April 9	Portland	W 116–105	Stephen Curry (45)	Draymond Green (14)	Stephen Curry (10)	Oracle Arena; 19,596	64–15
80	April 11	Minnesota	W 110–101	Stephen Curry (34)	Draymond Green (14)	Stephen Curry (7)	Oracle Arena; 19,596	65–15
81	April 13	Memphis	W 111–107	Klay Thompson (42)	Draymond Green (9)	Stephen Curry (8)	Oracle Arena; 19,596	66–15
82	April 15	Denver	W 133–126	Klay Thompson (25)	Marreese Speights (8)	Stephen Curry (7)	Oracle Arena; 19,596	67–15

2014–15 season schedule

== Playoffs ==
=== Game log ===
2015 playoff game log
Total: 16–5 (Home: 9–2; Road: 7–3)
First Round: 4–0 (home: 2–0; road: 2–0)

Game	Date	Team	Score	High points	High rebounds	High assists	Location Attendance	Series
1	April 18	New Orleans	W 106–99	Stephen Curry (34)	Andrew Bogut (14)	Draymond Green (7)	Oracle Arena; 19,596	1–0
2	April 20	New Orleans	W 97–87	Klay Thompson (26)	Andrew Bogut (14)	Stephen Curry (6)	Oracle Arena; 19,596	2–0
3	April 23	@ New Orleans	W 123–119 (OT)	Stephen Curry (40)	Draymond Green (17)	Stephen Curry (9)	Smoothie King Center; 18,444	3–0
4	April 25	@ New Orleans	W 109–98	Stephen Curry (39)	Draymond Green (10)	Stephen Curry (9)	Smoothie King Center; 18,443	4–0

Conference Semifinals: 4–2 (home: 2–1; road: 2–1)

Game	Date	Team	Score	High points	High rebounds	High assists	Location Attendance	Series
1	May 3	Memphis	W 101–86	Stephen Curry (22)	Andrew Bogut (7)	Stephen Curry (7)	Oracle Arena; 19,596	1–0
2	May 5	Memphis	L 90–97	Stephen Curry (19)	Bogut, Green (12)	Stephen Curry (6)	Oracle Arena; 19,596	1–1
3	May 9	@ Memphis	L 89–99	Stephen Curry (22)	Bogut, Thompson (8)	Stephen Curry (6)	FedEx Forum; 18,119	1–2
4	May 11	@ Memphis	W 101–84	Stephen Curry (33)	Draymond Green (10)	Stephen Curry (5)	FedEx Forum; 18,119	2–2
5	May 13	Memphis	W 98–78	Klay Thompson (21)	Andrew Bogut (9)	Draymond Green (9)	Oracle Arena; 19,596	3–2
6	May 15	@ Memphis	W 108–95	Stephen Curry (32)	Draymond Green (12)	Stephen Curry (11)	FedEx Forum; 18,119	4–2

Conference Finals: 4–1 (home: 3–0; road: 1–1)

Game	Date	Team	Score	High points	High rebounds	High assists	Location Attendance	Series
1	May 19	Houston	W 110–106	Stephen Curry (34)	Draymond Green (12)	Draymond Green (8)	Oracle Arena; 19,596	1–0
2	May 21	Houston	W 99–98	Stephen Curry (33)	Bogut, Green (8)	Draymond Green (7)	Oracle Arena; 19,596	2–0
3	May 23	@ Houston	W 115–80	Stephen Curry (40)	Draymond Green (13)	Stephen Curry (7)	Toyota Center; 18,282	3–0
4	May 25	@ Houston	L 115–128	Klay Thompson (24)	Draymond Green (15)	3 players tied (4)	Toyota Center; 18,239	3–1
5	May 27	Houston	W 104–90	Stephen Curry (26)	Andrew Bogut (14)	Curry, Iguodala (6)	Oracle Arena; 19,596	4–1

NBA Finals: 4–2 (home: 2–1; road: 2–1)

Game	Date	Team	Score	High points	High rebounds	High assists	Location Attendance	Record
1	June 4	Cleveland	W 108–100 (OT)	Stephen Curry (26)	Andrew Bogut (7)	Stephen Curry (8)	Oracle Arena; 19,596	1–0
2	June 7	Cleveland	L 93–95 (OT)	Klay Thompson (34)	Andrew Bogut (10)	Stephen Curry (5)	Oracle Arena; 19,596	1–1
3	June 9	@ Cleveland	L 91–96	Stephen Curry (27)	Ezeli, Green (7)	Stephen Curry (6)	Quicken Loans Arena; 20,562	1–2
4	June 11	@ Cleveland	W 103–82	Curry, Iguodala (22)	3 players tied (8)	Curry, Green (6)	Quicken Loans Arena; 20,562	2–2
5	June 14	Cleveland	W 104–91	Stephen Curry (37)	Harrison Barnes (10)	Andre Iguodala (7)	Oracle Arena; 19,596	3–2
6	June 16	@ Cleveland	W 105–97	Curry, Iguodala (25)	Draymond Green (11)	Draymond Green (10)	Quicken Loans Arena; 20,562	4–2

2015 playoff schedule

== Player statistics ==
Legend
GP	Games played	GS	Games started	MPG	Minutes per game
FG%	Field-goal percentage	3P%	3-point field-goal percentage	FT%	Free-throw percentage
RPG	Rebounds per game	APG	Assists per game	SPG	Steals per game
BPG	Blocks per game	PPG	Points per game

=== Regular season ===
Player	GP	GS	MPG	FG%	3P%	FT%	RPG	APG	SPG	BPG	PPG
Stephen Curry	80	80	32.7	.487	.443	.914	4.3	7.7	2.0	0.2	23.8
Klay Thompson	77	77	31.9	.463	.437	.879	3.2	2.9	1.1	0.8	21.7
Draymond Green	79	79	31.5	.443	.337	.660	8.2	3.7	1.6	1.3	11.7
Harrison Barnes	82	82	28.3	.482	.408	.720	5.5	1.4	0.7	0.2	10.1
Andre Iguodala	77	0	26.9	.466	.349	.596	3.3	3.0	1.2	0.3	7.8
Andrew Bogut	67	65	23.6	.563	.000	.524	8.1	2.7	0.6	1.7	6.3
Shaun Livingston	78	2	18.8	.500	.000	.714	2.2	3.3	0.6	0.3	5.9
David Lee	49	4	18.4	.511	.000	.654	5.2	1.7	0.6	0.5	7.9
Marreese Speights	76	9	15.9	.492	.278	.843	4.3	0.9	0.3	0.4	10.4
Leandro Barbosa	66	1	14.9	.474	.384	.784	1.4	1.5	0.6	0.1	7.1
Justin Holiday	59	4	11.1	.387	.321	.822	1.2	0.8	0.7	0.2	4.3
Festus Ezeli	46	7	11.0	.547	.000	.628	3.4	0.2	0.2	0.9	4.4
James Michael McAdoo	15	0	9.1	.545	.000	.560	2.5	0.1	0.3	0.6	4.1
Brandon Rush	33	0	8.2	.204	.111	.455	1.2	0.4	0.2	0.4	0.9
Ognjen Kuzmić	16	0	4.5	.667	.000	1.000	1.1	0.4	0.1	0.1	1.3

=== Playoffs ===
Player	GP	GS	MPG	FG%	3P%	FT%	RPG	APG	SPG	BPG	PPG
Stephen Curry	21	21	39.3	.456	.422	.835	5.0	6.4	1.9	.1	28.3
Draymond Green	21	21	37.3	.417	.264	.736	10.1	5.2	1.8	1.2	13.7
Klay Thompson	21	21	36.2	.446	.390	.800	3.9	2.6	.8	.9	18.6
Harrison Barnes	21	21	32.4	.440	.355	.735	5.2	1.5	.8	.5	10.6
Andre Iguodala	21	3	30.2	.474	.354	.415	4.5	3.6	1.2	.3	10.4
Shaun Livingston	21	0	17.9	.532	.000	.840	2.4	1.8	.4	.2	5.0
Leandro Barbosa	21	0	10.9	.443	.348	.818	1.3	.9	.3	.0	5.0
Festus Ezeli	20	0	9.2	.540		.552	3.1	.3	.1	.5	3.5
Andrew Bogut	19	18	23.2	.560	.000	.385	8.1	1.9	.6	1.8	4.7
David Lee	13	0	8.2	.400		.533	2.6	.6	.2	.2	3.1
Marreese Speights	10	0	6.7	.333		.600	2.1	.4	.4	.3	3.7
Justin Holiday	5	0	2.2	.500	1.000		.2	.2	.0	.0	.6
James Michael McAdoo	5	0	2.0	.667			.8	.0	.0	.2	.8
Brandon Rush	3	0	2.3	.167	.500		1.0	.0	.0	.0	1.0

== Roster ==
2014–15 Golden State Warriors roster
Players

Pos.	No.	Player	Height	Weight	DOB	From
G	19	Leandro Barbosa	6 ft 3 in (1.91 m)	194 lb (88 kg)	1982–11–28	Brazil
F	40	Harrison Barnes	6 ft 8 in (2.03 m)	225 lb (102 kg)	1992–05–30	North Carolina
C	12	Andrew Bogut	7 ft 0 in (2.13 m)	260 lb (118 kg)	1984–11–28	Utah
G	30	Stephen Curry	6 ft 3 in (1.91 m)	190 lb (86 kg)	1988–03–14	Davidson
C	31	Festus Ezeli	6 ft 11 in (2.11 m)	255 lb (116 kg)	1989–10–21	Vanderbilt
F	23	Draymond Green	6 ft 7 in (2.01 m)	230 lb (104 kg)	1990–03–04	Michigan State
G/F	7	Justin Holiday	6 ft 6 in (1.98 m)	185 lb (84 kg)	1989–04–05	Washington
G/F	9	Andre Iguodala	6 ft 6 in (1.98 m)	215 lb (98 kg)	1984–01–28	Arizona
C	1	Ognjen Kuzmić	7 ft 1 in (2.16 m)	231 lb (105 kg)	1990–05–16	Serbia
F/C	10	David Lee	6 ft 9 in (2.06 m)	245 lb (111 kg)	1983–04–29	Florida
G	34	Shaun Livingston	6 ft 7 in (2.01 m)	182 lb (83 kg)	1985–09–11	Peoria Central HS (IL)
F	20	James Michael McAdoo	6 ft 9 in (2.06 m)	230 lb (104 kg)	1993–01–04	North Carolina
G/F	4	Brandon Rush	6 ft 6 in (1.98 m)	220 lb (100 kg)	1985–07–07	Kansas
F/C	5	Marreese Speights	6 ft 10 in (2.08 m)	255 lb (116 kg)	1987–08–04	Florida
G	11	Klay Thompson	6 ft 7 in (2.01 m)	215 lb (98 kg)	1990–02–08	Washington State

Coaches
Head coach
- Steve Kerr
Assistant(s)
- Ron Adams
- Alvin Gentry
- Luke Walton
- Jarron Collins (player development)
- Bruce Fraser (player development)
- Keke Lyles (player performance)

Legend
- (DP) Unsigned draft pick
- (FA) Free agent
- (S) Suspended
- (DL) On assignment to D-League affiliate
- Injured

Roster

== Transactions ==
=== Free agency ===
==== Re-signed ====
Player	Signed
(United States) Klay Thompson	4-year maximum contract extension worth $70 million

==== Additions ====
Player	Signed	Former team
(United States) Shaun Livingston	3-year contract worth $16 million	Brooklyn Nets
(United States) Brandon Rush	2-year contract worth $2.5 million	Utah Jazz
(United States) James Michael McAdoo		Santa Cruz Warriors (NBA D-League)
(Serbia) Ognjen Kuzmic		Santa Cruz Warriors (NBA D-League)
(Brazil) Leandro Barbosa	1-year contract worth $1.5 million	Phoenix Suns

==== Subtractions ====
Player	Reason left	New team
(United States) Kent Bazemore	2-year contract worth $9.8 million	Los Angeles Lakers
(United States) James Michael McAdoo	Waived	Santa Cruz Warriors (NBA D-League)
(Serbia) Ognjen Kuzmic	Waived	Santa Cruz Warriors (NBA D-League)

== Awards ==
Player	Award	Date awarded	Ref.
(United States) Klay Thompson	Western Conference Player of the Week	November 3, 2014	
(United States) Stephen Curry	Western Conference Player of the Week	November 10, 2014	
(United States) Stephen Curry	Western Conference Player of the Month (November)	December 3, 2014	
(United States) Klay Thompson	Western Conference Player of the Week	January 12, 2015	
(United States) Klay Thompson	Western Conference Player of the Week	January 26, 2015	
(United States) Steve Kerr	Western Conference Coach of the Month (January)	February 2, 2015	
(United States) Stephen Curry	Western Conference Player of the Week	March 30, 2015	
(United States) Steve Kerr	Western Conference Coach of the Month (March)	April 1, 2015	
(United States) Bob Myers	Executive of the Year	May 1, 2015	
(United States) Stephen Curry	Most Valuable Player	May 4, 2015	
(United States) Andre Iguodala	Finals Most Valuable Player	June 16, 2015	
