= 2014–15 Minnesota Timberwolves season =

NBA professional basketball team season

- Head coach: Flip Saunders (Pre Season); Sam Mitchell (interim)
- Owners: Glen Taylor
- Arena: Target Center

Results
- Record: 16–66 (.195)
- Place: Division: 5th (Northwest); Conference: 15th (Western)
- Playoff finish: Did not qualify
- Stats at Basketball Reference

Local media
- Television: Fox Sports North
- Radio: WCCO

The 2014–15 Minnesota Timberwolves season was the 26th season of the franchise in the National Basketball Association (NBA). The Timberwolves finished with the worst record in the league at 16–66 and missed the NBA Playoffs for the 11th straight year. For the first time since 2007–08 season, Kevin Love was not on the roster as he was traded to the Cleveland Cavaliers in exchange for Andrew Wiggins, Anthony Bennett, and their future first-round picks. Despite not making the playoffs, Andrew Wiggins won the NBA Rookie of the Year. Flip Saunders returned to the Timberwolves' head coach on his second stint. Saunders was diagnosed with Hodgkin's lymphoma in August 2015 and he died two months later on October 25, 2015, at the age of 60. He was replaced by former Timberwolves player and former NBA Coach of the Year, Sam Mitchell for the following season. Kevin Garnett returned to the team for the first time since he left Minnesota in the offseason trade to the Boston Celtics in 2007.

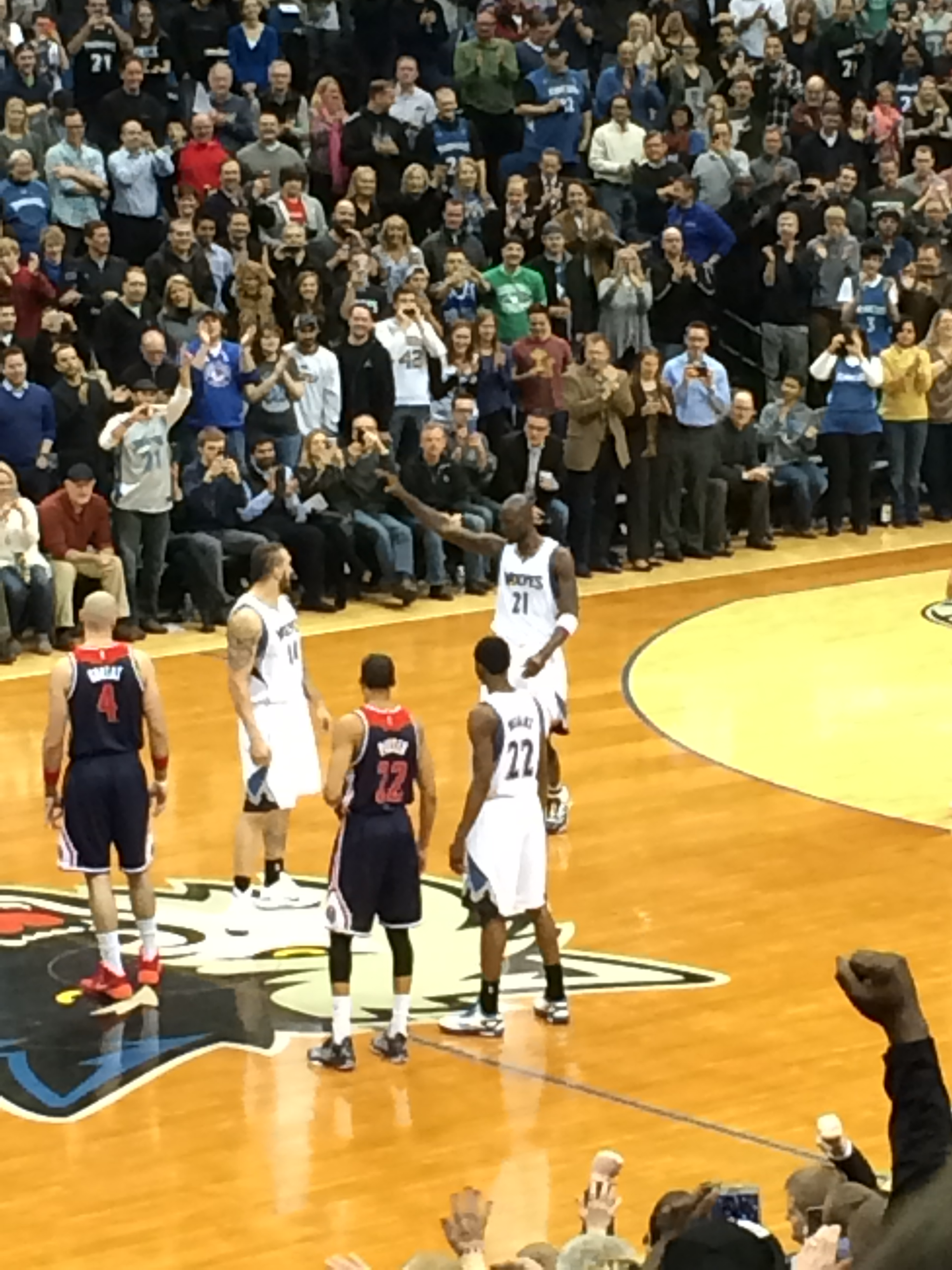
Kevin Garnett's first game back with the Timberwolves on February 25, 2015.

== Preseason ==
=== Draft picks ===
Round	Pick	Player	Position	Nationality	College
1	13	Zach LaVine	SG	United States	UCLA
2	40	Glenn Robinson III	SF	United States	Michigan
2	44	Markel Brown	SG	United States	Oklahoma State
2	53	Alessandro Gentile	SF	Italy	Olimpia Milano (Italy)

== Regular season ==
=== Standings ===
Northwest Division	W	L	PCT	GB	Home	Road	Div	GP
y-Portland Trail Blazers	51	31	.622	–	32‍–‍9	19‍–‍22	11–5	82
Oklahoma City Thunder	45	37	.549	6.0	29‍–‍12	16‍–‍25	10–6	82
Utah Jazz	38	44	.463	13.0	21‍–‍20	17‍–‍24	9–7	82
Denver Nuggets	30	52	.366	21.0	19‍–‍22	11‍–‍30	6–10	82
Minnesota Timberwolves	16	66	.195	35.0	9‍–‍32	7‍–‍34	4–12	82

Western Conference
#	Team	W	L	PCT	GB	GP
1	z-Golden State Warriors *	67	15	.817	–	82
2	y-Houston Rockets *	56	26	.683	11.0	82
3	x-Los Angeles Clippers	56	26	.683	11.0	82
4	y-Portland Trail Blazers *	51	31	.622	16.0	82
5	x-Memphis Grizzlies	55	27	.671	12.0	82
6	x-San Antonio Spurs	55	27	.671	12.0	82
7	x-Dallas Mavericks	50	32	.610	17.0	82
8	x-New Orleans Pelicans	45	37	.549	22.0	82
9	Oklahoma City Thunder	45	37	.549	22.0	82
10	Phoenix Suns	39	43	.476	28.0	82
11	Utah Jazz	38	44	.463	29.0	82
12	Denver Nuggets	30	52	.366	37.0	82
13	Sacramento Kings	29	53	.354	38.0	82
14	Los Angeles Lakers	21	61	.256	46.0	82
15	Minnesota Timberwolves	16	66	.195	51.0	82

== Game log ==
2014–15 game log
Total: 16–66 (Home: 9–32; Road: 7–34)
October: 1–1 (home: 1–0; road: 0–1)

Game	Date	Team	Score	High points	High rebounds	High assists	Location Attendance	Record
1	October 29	@ Memphis	L 101–105	Thaddeus Young (26)	Nikola Peković (8)	Ricky Rubio (7)	FedExForum; 17,731	0–1
2	October 30	Detroit	W 97–91	Thaddeus Young (19)	Nikola Peković (10)	Ricky Rubio (8)	Target Center; 18,296	1–1

November : 3–10 (home: 1–5; road: 2–5)

Game	Date	Team	Score	High points	High rebounds	High assists	Location Attendance	Record
3	November 1	Chicago	L 105–106	Kevin Martin (33)	Gorgui Dieng (8)	Ricky Rubio (17)	Target Center; 19,356	1–2
4	November 5	@ Brooklyn	W 98–91	Kevin Martin (24)	Thaddeus Young (12)	Ricky Rubio (12)	Barclays Center; 16,302	2–2
5	November 7	@ Orlando	L 103–112	Kevin Martin (21)	Gorgui Dieng (10)	Mo Williams (7)	Amway Center; 16,379	2–3
6	November 8	@ Miami	L 92–102	Nikola Peković (19)	Nikola Peković (11)	Mo Williams (5)	American Airlines Arena; 19,735	2–4
7	November 12	Houston	L 101–113	Corey Brewer (18)	Nikola Peković (13)	Zach LaVine (9)	Mexico City Arena; 18,996	2–5
8	November 14	@ New Orleans	L 91–139	Andrew Wiggins (20)	Gorgui Dieng (9)	Mo Williams (4)	Smoothie King Center; 14,775	2–6
9	November 15	@ Dallas	L 117–131	Kevin Martin (34)	Gorgui Dieng (8)	Mo Williams (8)	American Airlines Center; 19,730	2–7
10	November 19	New York	W 115–99	Kevin Martin (37)	Shabazz Muhammad (8)	Mo Williams (13)	Target Center; 15,304	3–7
11	November 21	San Antonio	L 92–121	Anthony Bennett (20)	Gorgui Dieng (10)	Williams & Brewer (4)	Target Center; 12,414	3–8
12	November 22	Sacramento	L 101–113	Andrew Wiggins (29)	Gorgui Dieng (10)	Mo Williams (12)	Target Center; 13,191	3–9
13	November 26	Milwaukee	L 86–103	Corey Brewer (19)	Wiggins & Dieng (8)	Wiggins, Young & LaVine (4)	Target Center; 14,710	3–10
14	November 28	@ L.A. Lakers	W 120–119	Zach LaVine (28)	Dieng & Brewer (7)	Mo Williams (11)	Staples Center; 18,997	4–10
15	November 30	@ Portland	L 93–107	Shabazz Muhammad (28)	Gorgui Dieng (8)	Mo Williams (11)	Moda Center; 18,843	4–11

December : 1–14 (home: 1–6; road: 0–8)

Game	Date	Team	Score	High points	High rebounds	High assists	Location Attendance	Record
16	December 1	@ L.A. Clippers	L 101–127	Shabazz Muhammad (18)	Shabazz Muhammad (10)	Mo Williams (7)	Staples Center; 19,060	4–12
17	December 3	Philadelphia	L 77–85	Thaddeus Young (16)	Gorgui Dieng (16)	Mo Williams (7)	Target Center; 10,463	4–13
18	December 5	Houston	L 112–114 (OT)	Shabazz Muhammad (20)	Corey Brewer (7)	Corey Brewer (6)	Target Center; 12,101	4–14
19	December 6	@ San Antonio	L 101–123	Zach LaVine (22)	Anthony Bennett (10)	Zach LaVine (10)	AT&T Center; 18,581	4–15
20	December 8	Golden State	L 86–102	Andrew Wiggins (21)	Gorgui Dieng (11)	Zach LaVine (8)	Target Center; 10,296	4–16
21	December 10	Portland	W 90–82	Andrew Wiggins (23)	Jeff Adrien (11)	Brewer & LaVine (5)	Target Center; 10,337	5–16
22	December 12	Oklahoma City	L 92–111	Wiggins & Muhammad (18)	Gorgui Dieng (9)	Corey Brewer (8)	Target Center; 13,557	5–17
23	December 14	L.A. Lakers	L 94–100	Shabazz Muhammad (28)	Dieng & Muhammad (9)	Corey Brewer (9)	Target Center; 15,008	5–18
24	December 16	@ Washington	L 95–109	Thaddeus Young (29)	Gorgui Dieng (12)	Zach LaVine (8)	Verizon Center; 15,823	5–19
25	December 19	@ Boston	L 98–114	Shabazz Muhammad (26)	Bennett & Adrien (7)	Thaddeus Young (6)	TD Garden; 17,042	5–20
26	December 21	Indiana	L 96–100	Mo Williams (24)	Andrew Wiggins (9)	Mo Williams (10)	Target Center; 12,687	5–21
27	December 23	@ Cleveland	L 104–125	Andrew Wiggins (27)	Gorgui Dieng (11)	Mo Williams (7)	Quicken Loans Arena; 20,562	5–22
28	December 26	@ Denver	L 102–106	Thaddeus Young (23)	Gorgui Dieng (13)	Mo Williams (13)	Pepsi Center; 14,516	5–23
29	December 27	@ Golden State	L 97–110	Thaddeus Young (17)	Shabazz Muhammad (9)	Zach LaVine (14)	Oracle Arena; 19,596	5–24
30	December 30	@ Utah	L 94–100	Shabazz Muhammad (30)	Shabazz Muhammad (7)	Young & Dieng (6)	EnergySolutions Arena; 18,947	5–25

January : 3–14 (home: 1–8; road: 2–6)

Game	Date	Team	Score	High points	High rebounds	High assists	Location Attendance	Record
31	January 1	Sacramento	L 107–110	Andrew Wiggins (27)	Gorgui Dieng (10)	Mo Williams (8)	Target Center; 13,337	5–26
32	January 3	Utah	L 89–101	Wiggins & Williams (20)	Jeff Adrien (8)	Mo Williams (3)	Target Center; 13,702	5–27
33	January 5	Denver	L 101–110	Gorgui Dieng (22)	Gorgui Dieng (12)	Mo Williams (7)	Target Center; 10,386	5–28
34	January 7	Phoenix	L 111–113	Andrew Wiggins (25)	Anthony Bennett (10)	Mo Williams (11)	Target Center; 10,547	5–29
35	January 9	@ Milwaukee	L 84–98	Andrew Wiggins (20)	Anthony Bennett (8)	Andrew Wiggins (5)	BMO Harris Bradley Center; 15,480	5–30
36	January 10	San Antonio	L 93–108	Zach LaVine (19)	Gorgui Dieng (12)	Mo Williams (6)	Target Center; 17,871	5–31
37	January 13	@ Indiana	W 110–101	Mo Williams (52)	Gorgui Dieng (10)	Mo Williams (7)	Bankers Life Fieldhouse; 16,781	6–31
38	January 16	@ Phoenix	L 99–110	Mo Williams (26)	Thaddeus Young (8)	Thaddeus Young (6)	US Airways Center; 17,441	6–32
39	January 17	@ Denver	W 113–105	Andrew Wiggins (31)	Robbie Hummel (13)	Mo Williams (7)	Target Center; 14,821	7–32
40	January 19	@ Charlotte	L 80–105	Thaddeus Young (18)	Gorgui Dieng (10)	Mo Williams (4)	Time Warner Cable Arena; 17,989	7–33
41	January 21	Dallas	L 75–98	Andrew Wiggins (18)	Thaddeus Young (11)	Thaddeus Young (6)	Target Center; 13,737	7–34
42	January 23	New Orleans	L 84–92	Williams & Dieng (7) (15)	Gorgui Dieng (15)	Mo Williams (10)	Target Center; 14,978	7–35
43	January 25	@ Atlanta	L 100–112	Thaddeus Young (26)	Wiggins, Williams & Dieng (7)	Thaddeus Young (7)	Philips Arena; 18,049	7–36
44	January 26	@ Oklahoma City	L 84–92	Andrew Wiggins (23)	Gorgui Dieng (18)	Williams & Young (3)	Chesapeake Energy Arena; 18,203	7–37
45	January 28	Boston	W 110–98	Kevin Martin (21)	Gorgui Dieng (14)	Zach LaVine (6)	Target Center; 11,434	8–37
46	January 30	@ Philadelphia	L 94–103	Kevin Martin (19)	Gorgui Dieng (10)	Kevin Martin (5)	Wells Fargo Center; 14,333	8–38
47	January 31	Cleveland	L 90–106	Andrew Wiggins (33)	Nikola Peković (12)	Lorenzo Brown (9)	Target Center; 19,562	8–39

February : 5–6 (home: 4–3; road: 1–3)

Game	Date	Team	Score	High points	High rebounds	High assists	Location Attendance	Record
48	February 2	@ Dallas	L 94–100	Kevin Martin (19)	Nikola Peković (10)	Mo Williams (5)	American Airlines Center; 19,989	8–40
49	February 4	Miami	W 102–101	Kevin Martin (30)	Gorgui Dieng (9)	Mo Williams (10)	Target Center; 11,517	9–40
50	February 6	Memphis	W 90–89	Andrew Wiggins (18)	Thaddeus Young (8)	Ricky Rubio (5)	Target Center; 14,388	10–40
51	February 8	@ Detroit	W 112–101	Nikola Peković (29)	Kevin Martin (9)	Mo Williams (9)	Palace of Auburn Hills; 16,075	11–40
52	February 9	Atlanta	L 105–117	Kevin Martin (21)	Gorgui Dieng (12)	Rubio & Young (5)	Target Center; 10,987	11–41
53	February 11	Golden State	L 91–94	Kevin Martin (21)	Nikola Peković (13)	Ricky Rubio (5)	Target Center; 14,303	11–42
All-Star Break
54	February 20	Phoenix	W 111–109	Kevin Martin (21)	Gorgui Dieng (12)	Ricky Rubio (14)	Target Center; 14,077	12–42
55	February 23	@ Houston	L 102–113	Andrew Wiggins (30)	Gorgui Dieng (14)	Ricky Rubio (7)	Toyota Center; 18,240	12–43
56	February 25	Washington	W 97–77	Kevin Martin (28)	Nikola Peković (13)	Ricky Rubio (8)	Target Center; 19,856	13–43
57	February 27	@ Chicago	L 89–96	Kevin Martin (18)	Nikola Peković (11)	Ricky Rubio (10)	United Center; 21,635	13–44
58	February 28	Memphis	L 97–101	Andrew Wiggins (25)	Gorgui Dieng (9)	Ricky Rubio (10)	Target Center; 19,356	13–45

March : 3–12 (home: 1–6; road: 2–6)

Game	Date	Team	Score	High points	High rebounds	High assists	Location Attendance	Record
59	March 2	L.A. Clippers	L 105–110	Gary Neal (19)	Ricky Rubio (12)	Ricky Rubio (11)	Target Center; 18,239	13–46
60	March 4	Denver	L 85–100	Andrew Wiggins (20)	Gorgui Dieng (10)	Ricky Rubio (10)	Target Center; 13,848	13–47
61	March 7	Portland	W 121–113	Kevin Martin (29)	Peković & Rubio (8)	Ricky Rubio (15)	Target Center; 19,356	14–47
62	March 9	@ L.A. Clippers	L 76–89	Adreian Payne (16)	Adreian Payne (15)	Ricky Rubio (12)	Staples Center; 19,060	14–48
63	March 11	@ Phoenix	L 97–106	Kevin Martin (16)	Gorgui Dieng (7)	Ricky Rubio (6)	US Airways Center; 17,367	14–49
64	March 13	@ Oklahoma City	L 99–113	Gorgui Dieng (21)	Gorgui Dieng (14)	Zach LaVine (7)	Chesapeake Energy Arena; 18,203	14–50
65	March 15	@ San Antonio	L 97–123	Kevin Martin (19)	Justin Hamilton (10)	Lorenzo Brown (7)	AT&T Center; 18,581	14–51
66	March 16	Brooklyn	L 106–122	Kevin Martin (23)	Justin Hamilton & Wiggins (10)	Kevin Martin (6)	Target Center; 14,234	14–52
67	March 18	@ Toronto	L 100–105	Kevin Martin (37)	Budinger & Rubio (8)	Ricky Rubio (8)	Air Canada Centre; 19,800	14–53
68	March 19	@ New York	W 95–92 (OT)	Kevin Martin (22)	Gorgui Dieng (11)	Zach LaVine (4)	Madison Square Garden; 19,812	15–53
69	March 22	Charlotte	L 98–109	Gorgui Dieng (16)	Adreian Payne (9)	Kevin Martin (9)	Target Center; 15,262	15–54
70	March 23	@ Utah	W 106–104 (OT)	Zach LaVine (27)	Adreian Payne (9)	Lorenzo Brown (6)	EnergySolutions Arena; 19,911	16–54
71	March 25	L.A. Lakers	L 99–101 (OT)	Andrew Wiggins (20)	Lorenzo Brown (9)	Zach LaVine (5)	Target Center; 13,438	16–55
72	March 27	@ Houston	L 110–120	Andrew Wiggins (31)	Gorgui Dieng (12)	Zach LaVine (8)	Toyota Center; 18,322	16–56
73	March 29	@ New Orleans	L 88–110	Andrew Wiggins (20)	Adreian Payne (11)	Lorenzo Brown (9)	Smoothie King Center; 17,576	16–57
74	March 30	Utah	L 84–104	Zach LaVine (21)	Budinger & Hummel (7)	Brown & LaVine (6)	Target Center; 12,229	16–58

April : 0–8 (home: 0–4; road: 0–4)

Game	Date	Team	Score	High points	High rebounds	High assists	Location Attendance	Record
75	April 1	Toronto	L 99–113	Andrew Wiggins (25)	Zach LaVine (7)	Brown & Wiggins (5)	Target Center; 12,699	16–59
76	April 3	Orlando	L 84–97	Andrew Wiggins (22)	Justin Hamilton (9)	Zach LaVine (5)	Target Center; 18,334	16–60
77	April 7	@ Sacramento	L 111–116	Kevin Martin (37)	Andrew Wiggins (8)	Zach LaVine (11)	Sleep Train Arena; 16,770	16–61
78	April 8	@ Portland	L 91–116	Andrew Wiggins (29)	Justin Hamilton (9)	Zach LaVine (6)	Moda Center; 19,499	16–62
79	April 10	@ L.A. Lakers	L 98–106	Andrew Wiggins (29)	Andrew Wiggins (10)	Andrew Wiggins (6)	Staples Center; 17,880	16–63
80	April 11	@ Golden State	L 101–110	Zach LaVine (37)	Justin Hamilton (10)	Andrew Wiggins (9)	Oracle Arena; 19,596	16–64
81	April 13	New Orleans	L 88–100	Zach LaVine (24)	Robbie Hummel (10)	Zach LaVine (7)	Target Center; 13,009	16–65
82	April 15	Oklahoma City	L 113–138	Kevin Martin (29)	Anthony Bennett (9)	Zach LaVine (13)	Target Center; 18,250	16–66

2014–15 season schedule

== Player statistics ==
=== Regular season ===
Player	POS	GP	GS	MP	REB	AST	STL	BLK	PTS	MPG	RPG	APG	SPG	BPG	PPG
Andrew Wiggins	SF	82	82	2,969	374	170	86	50	1,387	36.2	4.6	2.1	1.0	.6	16.9
Zach LaVine	PG	77	40	1,902	214	276	54	10	778	24.7	2.8	3.6	.7	.1	10.1
Gorgui Dieng	C	73	49	2,193	609	146	71	126	710	30.0	8.3	2.0	1.0	1.7	9.7
Chase Budinger	SF	67	4	1,286	198	64	44	10	457	19.2	3.0	1.0	.7	.1	6.8
Anthony Bennett	PF	57	3	894	216	48	27	16	298	15.7	3.8	.8	.5	.3	5.2
Thaddeus Young^{†}	PF	48	48	1,605	245	135	86	17	685	33.4	5.1	2.8	1.8	.4	14.3
Robbie Hummel	SF	45	4	742	134	27	16	9	198	16.5	3.0	.6	.4	.2	4.4
Mo Williams^{†}	PG	41	19	1,149	98	261	30	8	499	28.0	2.4	6.4	.7	.2	12.2
Kevin Martin	SG	39	36	1,302	142	89	33	1	779	33.4	3.6	2.3	.8	.0	20.0
Shabazz Muhammad	SG	38	13	866	154	44	18	7	512	22.8	4.1	1.2	.5	.2	13.5
Nikola Peković	C	31	29	815	234	27	19	12	386	26.3	7.5	.9	.6	.4	12.5
Adreian Payne^{†}	PF	29	22	720	158	30	18	9	208	24.8	5.4	1.0	.6	.3	7.2
Lorenzo Brown	PG	29	7	549	70	90	28	6	122	18.9	2.4	3.1	1.0	.2	4.2
Glenn Robinson III^{†}	SG	25	0	108	14	3	3	0	29	4.3	.6	.1	.1	.0	1.2
Corey Brewer^{†}	SF	24	16	680	94	78	54	4	251	28.3	3.9	3.3	2.3	.2	10.5
Ricky Rubio	PG	22	22	692	125	193	38	1	226	31.5	5.7	8.8	1.7	.0	10.3
Troy Daniels^{†}	SG	19	0	154	19	13	3	0	53	8.1	1.0	.7	.2	.0	2.8
Justin Hamilton^{†}	C	17	9	423	86	24	19	25	153	24.9	5.1	1.4	1.1	1.5	9.0
Jeff Adrien	PF	17	0	215	77	15	4	9	60	12.6	4.5	.9	.2	.5	3.5
Gary Neal^{†}	SG	11	1	262	35	20	7	0	130	23.8	3.2	1.8	.6	.0	11.8
Arinze Onuaku	C	6	1	68	21	4	1	3	27	11.3	3.5	.7	.2	.5	4.5
Kevin Garnett^{†}	PF	5	5	98	26	8	5	4	38	19.6	5.2	1.6	1.0	.8	7.6
Miroslav Raduljica	C	5	0	23	5	0	1	0	8	4.6	1.0	.0	.2	.0	1.6
Sean Kilpatrick	SG	4	0	72	6	4	3	0	22	18.0	1.5	1.0	.8	.0	5.5
Ronny Turiaf	C	2	0	19	1	2	0	0	0	9.5	.5	1.0	.0	.0	.0

- ^{†} Denotes player spent time with another team in the season. Stats reflect time with the Timberwolves only.

== Injuries ==
Player	Duration		Injury type	Games missed
Player	Start	End	Injury type	Games missed

== Roster ==
2014–15 Minnesota Timberwolves roster
Players

Pos.	No.	Player	Height	Weight	DOB	From
SG	7	Lorenzo Brown	6 ft 5 in (1.96 m)	189 lb (86 kg)	1990–08–26	NC State
SF	10	Chase Budinger	6 ft 7 in (2.01 m)	209 lb (95 kg)	1988–05–22	Arizona
C	5	Gorgui Dieng	6 ft 11 in (2.11 m)	245 lb (111 kg)	1990–01–18	Louisville
PF	21	Kevin Garnett	6 ft 11 in (2.11 m)	253 lb (115 kg)	1976–05–19	Farragut Academy (IL)
C	41	Justin Hamilton	7 ft 0 in (2.13 m)	260 lb (118 kg)	1990–04–01	LSU
SF	4	Robbie Hummel	6 ft 9 in (2.06 m)	219 lb (99 kg)	1989–03–08	Purdue
SG	23	Kevin Martin	6 ft 7 in (2.01 m)	204 lb (93 kg)	1983–02–01	Western Carolina
SF	15	Shabazz Muhammad	6 ft 6 in (1.98 m)	227 lb (103 kg)	1992–11–13	UCLA
SG	12	Gary Neal	6 ft 4 in (1.93 m)	210 lb (95 kg)	1984–10–03	Towson
PF	50	Arinze Onuaku	6 ft 9 in (2.06 m)	275 lb (125 kg)	1987–07–13	Syracuse
PF	3	Adreian Payne	6 ft 10 in (2.08 m)	245 lb (111 kg)	1991–02–19	Michigan State
C	14	Nikola Peković	6 ft 11 in (2.11 m)	307 lb (139 kg)	1986–01–03	Montenegro
PG	9	Ricky Rubio	6 ft 4 in (1.93 m)	192 lb (87 kg)	1990–10–21	Spain

Coaches
Head coach
- Flip Saunders
Assistant(s)
- David Adelman
- Sidney Lowe
- Sam Mitchell
- Ryan Saunders

Legend
- (DP) Unsigned draft pick
- (FA) Free agent
- (S) Suspended
- (DL) On assignment to D-League affiliate
- Injured

Roster
Updated: 2015–04–07

== Transactions ==
=== Free agents ===
==== Re-signed ====
Player	Signed	Contract	Ref.

==== Additions ====
Player	Signed	Former team	Ref.

==== Subtractions ====
Player	Reason left	Date	New team	Ref.

== Awards ==
Player	Award	Date awarded	Ref.

Andrew Wiggins won the 2015 NBA Rookie of the Year Award.
