= Appling =

Appling may refer to:

== Places ==
- Appling, Georgia
- Appling County, Georgia

== People ==
- Daniel Appling (1787–1817), officer in the United States Army
- Dean R. Appling, American biochemist
- Howell Appling Jr. (1919–2002), American businessman and Republican politician
- Keith Appling (born 1992), American basketball player
- Luke Appling (1907–1991), American baseball player
- Peter C. Appling (1822–1908), member of the California State Assembly (1869–1871)

== Other ==
- USS Appling (APA-58), a ship
