= Jelan Kendrick =

American basketball player (born 1991)

Free agent
- Position: Shooting guard

Personal information
- Born: October 9, 1991 (age 35)
- Listed height: 6 ft 6 in (1.98 m)
- Listed weight: 210 lb (95 kg)

Career information
- High school: Joseph Wheeler (Marietta, Georgia)
- College: Ole Miss (2011–2012); Indian Hills CC (2012–2013); UNLV (2013–2015)
- NBA draft: 2015: undrafted
- Playing career: 2017–present

Career history
- 2017–2018: Nevada Desert Dogs
- 2018–2019: London Lightning
- 2019: Fraser Valley Bandits
- 2020: Pioneros de Los Mochis
- 2021–2022: Clube Ferroviário de Maputo
- 2023–2024: Yamaguchi Patsfive

Career highlights
- Third-team Parade All-American (2010); McDonald's All-American (2010)

Jelan Kendrick (born October 9, 1991) is an American basketball player for the Pioneros de Los Mochis of the Circuito de Baloncesto de la Costa del Pacífico (CIBACOPA). He was a McDonald's All-American for Joseph Wheeler High School in Atlanta, Georgia. Kendrick was a member of the UNLV Runnin Rebels in college.

== High school ==
- Named to the 2010 McDonald's All-American Boys Game.
- Also named to the 2010 Jordan Brand Classic.
- Ranked as the nation's second-best small forward and 13th-best overall player by ESPN.com.
- Considered a five-star recruit by Rivals.com.
- Ranked as the eighth best player in the country by Rivals.com.
- Leading scorer at Indian Hills CC

College recruiting
Name	Hometown	School	Height	Weight	Commit date
Jelan Kendrick; SG/PG	College Park, GA	Wheeler HS	6 ft 7 in (2.01 m)	210 lb (95 kg)	Nov 14, 2009
Jelan Kendrick; SG/PG	Recruit ratings: Scout: Rivals: (95)				

== UNLV ==
Season Stats

SEASON	TEAM	MIN	FGM	FGA	FG%	3PM	3PA	3P%	FTM	FTA	FT%	REB	AST	BLK	STL	PF	TO	PTS
2014–15	UNLV	24.6	2.2	5.4	.407	0.6	2.0	.300	0.5	1.2	.417	3.3	1.9	0.3	0.7	1.4	1.7	5.5
2013–14	UNLV	20.8	2.4	5.6	.428	0.6	1.7	.333	1.0	1.8	.544	2.4	1.4	0.2	0.6	1.7	1.4	6.3
2011–12	MISS	20.7	1.8	5.8	.308	0.3	1.3	.261	1.2	2.0	.611	2.2	1.7	0.2	1.3	1.1	1.7	5.1

== Professional career ==
On August 8, 2018, Kendrick signed with the London Lightning of the National Basketball League of Canada.
