= Tristan Thompson =

Canadian basketball player (born 1991)

- Thompson in 2026

Dubai Basketball
- Title: Global ambassador
- League: ABA League; EuroLeague

Personal information
- Born: March 13, 1991 (age 35) Brampton, Ontario, Canada
- Listed height: 6 ft 9 in (2.06 m)
- Listed weight: 254 lb (115 kg)

Career information
- High school: d'Youville (Brampton, Ontario); St. Benedict's Prep (Newark, New Jersey); Findlay Prep (Henderson, Nevada)
- College: Texas (2010–2011)
- NBA draft: 2011: 1st round, 4th overall pick
- Drafted by: Cleveland Cavaliers
- Playing career: 2011–2025
- Position: Centre

Career history
- 2011–2020: Cleveland Cavaliers
- 2020–2021: Boston Celtics
- 2021–2022: Sacramento Kings
- 2022: Indiana Pacers
- 2022: Chicago Bulls
- 2023: Los Angeles Lakers
- 2023–2025: Cleveland Cavaliers

Career highlights
- NBA champion (2016); NBA All-Rookie Second Team (2012); Second-team All-Big 12 (2011); Big 12 Freshman of the Year (2011); Second-team Parade All-American (2010); McDonald's All-American (2010)
- Stats at NBA.com
- Stats at Basketball Reference
Medals
Men's basketball
Representing Canada
FIBA Americas U18 Championship
Bronze medal – third place	2008 Formosa	Team competition

Tristan Trevor James Thompson (born March 13, 1991) is a Canadian–American former professional basketball player who is a global ambassador for Dubai Basketball of the ABA League and the EuroLeague. Thompson played one season of college basketball for the Texas Longhorns before being selected by the Cleveland Cavaliers as the fourth overall pick in the 2011 NBA draft. He won an NBA championship with the Cavaliers in 2016 and has also played for the Boston Celtics, Sacramento Kings, Indiana Pacers, Chicago Bulls, and Los Angeles Lakers. Thompson also represented Canada in international competitions.

== High school career ==
Born in Brampton, Ontario, Thompson attended St. Marguerite d'Youville Secondary School for grades 9 and 10. After making two trips from Brampton to visit a prep school in the United States, Thompson decided to attend Saint Benedict's Preparatory School in Newark, New Jersey, for his sophomore year, alongside fellow University of Texas at Austin commit Myck Kabongo. He cited increased exposure and a higher level of competition as his reasons for transferring.

Thompson spent his sophomore and half his junior year at St. Benedict's, making an immediate impact and showing flashes of brilliance. In his short time there, he shot through the ranks to super-stardom, becoming the top recruit in the nation entering his junior season. The nation's top basketball programs heavily sought Thompson, who made the first verbal commitment of the class of 2010 to Rick Barnes and the Texas Longhorns.

Twenty-one games into his junior year, the relationship between Thompson and then-St. Benedict's coach Dan Hurley hit a rough patch. Hurley's in-your-face, no-holds-barred coaching style took a toll on the young star. During a game against then-top-ranked Mater Dei, Hurley confronted Thompson during a time out. A heated debate ensued, and Thompson was sent off the court and later removed from the team. Over the next few days he made it known that he was planning to leave, resulting in a barrage of calls from top prep schools throughout North America trying to acquire his services. The next week he transferred to Findlay Prep with his close friend and AAU teammate Cory Joseph.

Thompson joined Findlay on the back end of their schedule, making an immediate impact on the team and thriving under Findlay coach Michael Peck's system and coaching style. Thompson solidified his top recruit status and helped lead Findlay to their first national championship. He continued to round and polish his skills in his senior year in preparation for college and held fast to his commitment to the University of Texas, officially signing his letter of intent on November 11, 2009. Thompson then led his team to another National Championship at the ESPN National High School Invitational. After their senior year, Thompson and Joseph both committed to Texas and were the fourth and fifth Canadians to be named McDonald's All-Americans, after Bill Wennington (1981), Barry Bekkedam (1986) and Olu Famutimi (2003). Thompson was also named a Jordan Brand Classic All-American.

== College career ==
Thompson averaged 13.1 points and 7.8 rebounds per game for the Texas Longhorns in 2010–11 as he won the team's Most Valuable Player award, as voted on by his teammates. Nationally, Thompson was one of five finalists for the Wayman Tisdale Award, an honour given to the National Freshman of the Year by the U.S. Basketball Writers Association. Thompson won the Big 12 Freshman of the Year honours as well as first-team NABC All-District 8 and USBWA All-District VII honours. He led the team in rebounding, blocked shots (86), double-doubles (10) and field goal percentage (.546) while ranking second in scoring. He helped Texas conclude the 2010–11 season with a 28–8 record and advanced to the NCAA Tournament Round of 32. The Longhorns finished No. 8 in the final AP poll.

Thompson told media after the NCAA tournament that he planned to return to Texas for his sophomore season but changed his mind. On April 21, 2011, he declared for the NBA draft, forgoing his last three years of college eligibility.

== Professional career ==
=== Cleveland Cavaliers (2011–2020) ===
==== 2011–12 season: Rookie season ====
On June 23, 2011, Thompson was drafted fourth overall in the 2011 NBA draft by the Cleveland Cavaliers. At the time, he was the highest drafted Canadian-born player in NBA history, that was until Anthony Bennett and Andrew Wiggins were selected as the first overall pick in 2013 and 2014, respectively. Thompson continued to make history, drafted alongside Joseph, who was picked 29th by the San Antonio Spurs, only the second occasion in NBA history to that date that two Canadians were selected in the first round of the same draft, the first being in 1983 when Leo Rautins and Stewart Granger were selected 17th and 25th respectively. The 2011 draft was also the first time three Texas Longhorn basketball players went in the first round of a draft, when Thompson's former collegiate teammate Jordan Hamilton went 26th overall to the Dallas Mavericks.

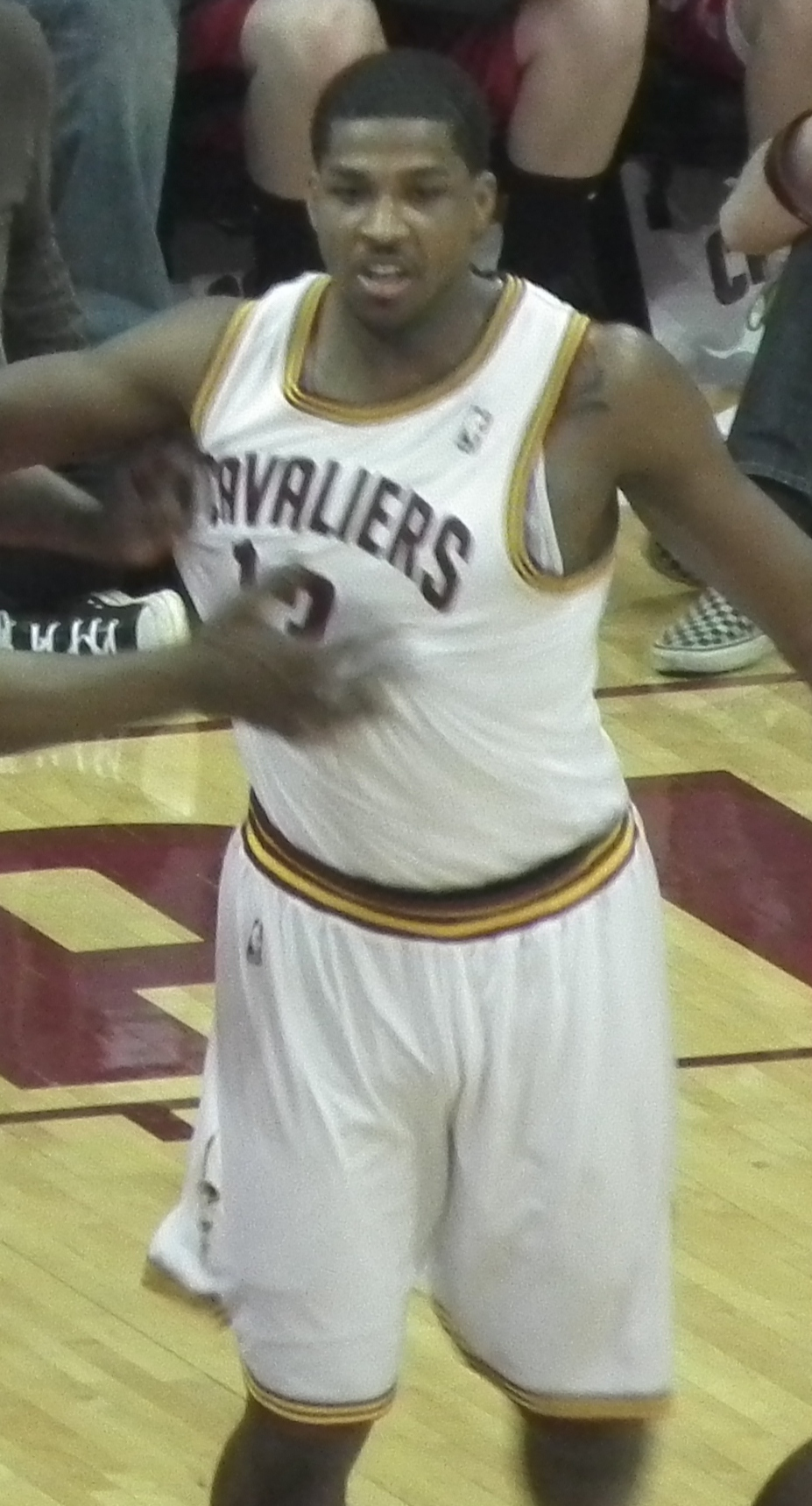
Thompson during his rookie season in 2012

During the 2011 NBA lockout, Thompson attended classes at the University of Texas to finish his college degree. Thompson signed his rookie contract with the Cavaliers on December 9, 2011, before the start of training camp. Thompson made his professional debut against his hometown Toronto Raptors on December 26, 2011. In 17 minutes off the bench, Thompson scored 12 points and pulled in 5 rebounds. Both Thompson and teammate Kyrie Irving were later named to the 2012 Rising Stars Challenge. However, Thompson was selected to play for Team Shaq, while Irving was selected by Team Chuck.

Thompson finished the season with averages of 8.2 points and 6.5 rebounds in 60 games as he earned NBA All-Rookie Second Team honors, becoming the first Canadian to ever earn All-Rookie team honors in the NBA.

==== 2012–13 season ====
In the 2012–13 season, Thompson worked on avoiding getting his own shots blocked, and switched his shooting hand from left to right. For most of the season, almost 17%, or one out of six, of his shots were blocked, (Note: The league average is 6.3% of shots being blocked.) threatening former NBA player Danny Fortson's 16.7% rate in 1997–98. Thompson dropped to around 15% by season's end, which was only reached by three other players before the season. (Note: Comparison limited to players who attempted at least 500 field goals in a season since 1997, the earliest for which NBA.com has data.) He went on to average 3.7 offensive rebounds per game, which ranked fifth in the NBA and first among second year players, and set the Cavaliers franchise record for most offensive rebounds in a single season with 306 (second in the NBA), surpassing Zydrunas Ilgauskas' 299 offensive rebounds in the 2004–05 season. He also recorded a team-high 31 double-doubles on the season, becoming just the ninth player in franchise history to total at least 30 double-doubles in a single season. He started all 82 games in 2012–13 as he averaged 11.7 points on .488 shooting, 9.4 rebounds and 0.9 blocks in 31.3 minutes per game.

==== 2013–14 season ====
In the 2013 off-season, Thompson decided to switch his shooting hand to his right instead of his left. Despite the change, he had an almost identical season for the Cavaliers in 2013–14, as he started all 82 games while averaging 11.7 points and 9.2 rebounds in 31.6 minutes per game. He tied for fifth in the Eastern Conference with a team-leading and career-best 36 double-doubles.

==== 2014–15 season ====
During the 2014 off-season, the Cavaliers acquired All-Star forwards LeBron James and Kevin Love. Thompson came off the bench for most of the season, providing energy and solidifying his place as one of the best offensive rebounders in the league, averaging 8.5 points and 8 rebounds per game. He played in all 82 games and started 15. The Cavaliers finished with a 53–29 record and made the playoffs for the first time since 2010. Early in the first round, Kevin Love dislocated his shoulder and was ruled out for the rest of the post-season. Thompson became the starter after Love's injury and helped the Cavaliers reach the 2015 NBA Finals. The Cavaliers faced the Golden State Warriors, and lost the series in six games. During the playoffs, Thompson emerged as one of the NBA's best rebounders, especially on the offensive glass. He became a restricted free agent after the season.

==== 2015–16 season: Championship season ====
On October 22, 2015, Thompson re-signed with the Cavaliers on a five-year, $82 million contract, ending a four-month contract stalemate that caused Thompson to miss training camp, the preseason, and the FIBA Americas Championship. Throughout the 2015–16 season, Thompson shared the starting centre role with Timofey Mozgov. On January 25, 2016, he recorded a season-high 19 points and 12 rebounds in a 114–107 win over the Minnesota Timberwolves. On March 26, in a win over the New York Knicks, Thompson tied Jim Chones' franchise record by appearing in his 361st consecutive game for the Cavaliers. He broke that record three days later, appearing in his 362nd consecutive game in a loss to the Houston Rockets. Thompson helped the Cavaliers reach the NBA Finals for the second consecutive season. There they made NBA history by coming back from a 3–1 deficit against the Golden State Warriors to win the series in seven games, ending a 52-year championship drought in Cleveland.

==== 2016–17 season ====
On December 26, 2016, in a loss to the Detroit Pistons, Thompson became the first player in franchise history to play in 400 consecutive regular-season games. On April 5, 2017, Thompson missed the Cavaliers' game against the Boston Celtics with a sprained right thumb. Thompson's absence ended his streak of consecutive games played at 447—the longest in team history and the longest active streak in the league at the time. He missed four games with the injury before returning to action in Cleveland's regular-season finale on April 12 against the Toronto Raptors. Thompson helped the Cavaliers go 12–1 over the first three rounds of the playoffs to reach the NBA Finals for a third straight season. There the Cavaliers matched-up with the Golden State Warriors, but lost the series in five games.

==== 2017–18 season ====
On November 2, 2017, Thompson was ruled out for three to four weeks with a left calf strain that he suffered the previous night against the Indiana Pacers. On December 12, 2017, he played in his first game since November 1; he went scoreless and did not have a rebound in 6 minutes against the Atlanta Hawks. On February 25, 2018, he had a season-high 13 rebounds in 23 minutes in a 110–94 loss to the San Antonio Spurs. In Game 7 of the Cavaliers' first-round playoff series against the Pacers, Thompson, who played just 24 minutes in the first six games, made a rare start and had 15 points and 10 rebounds in a 105–101 win. The Cavaliers made it to the 2018 NBA Finals, where they were swept by the Golden State Warriors.

==== 2018–19 season ====
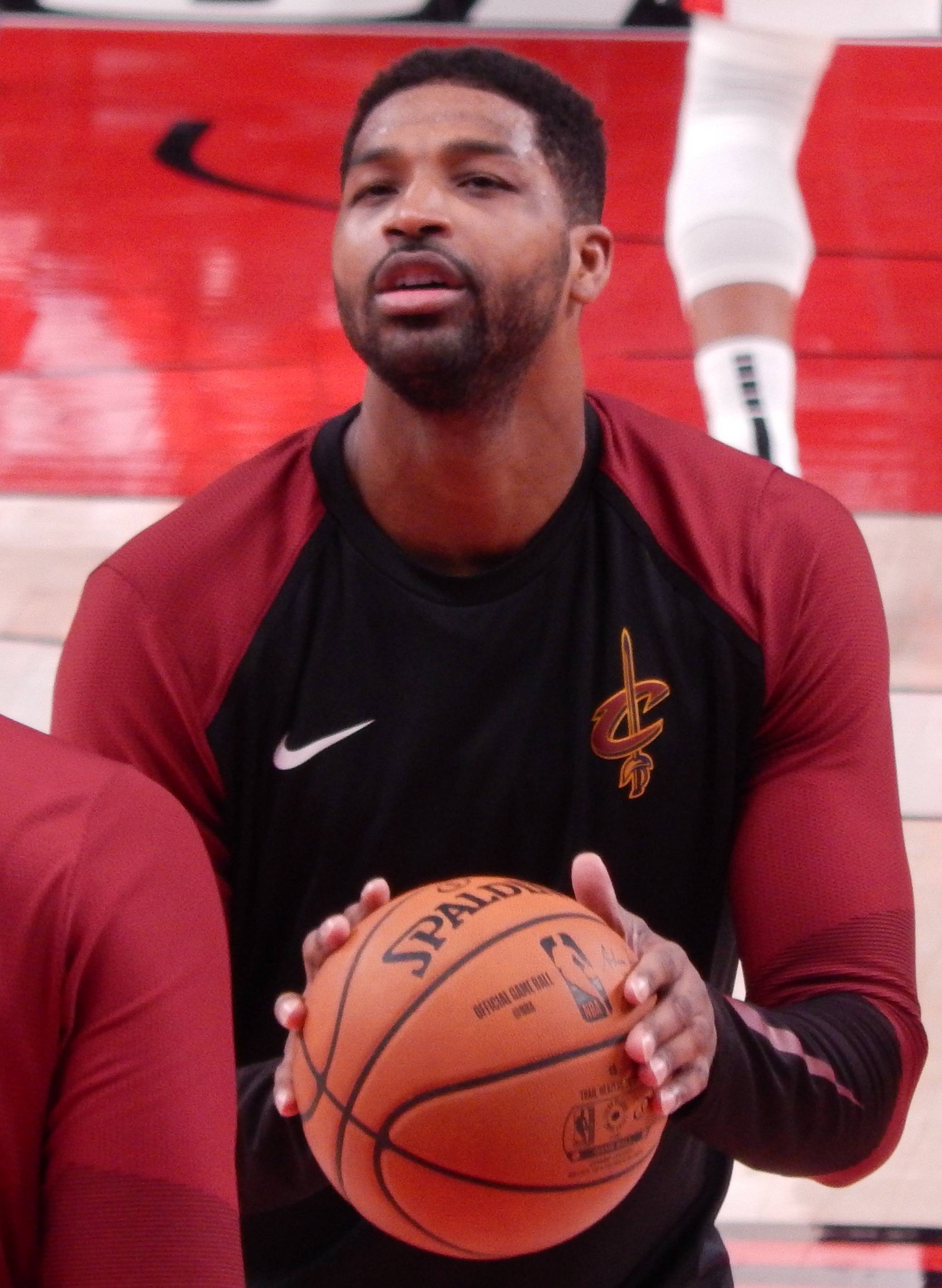
Thompson in January 2019

To begin the season for the 6–21 Cavaliers, Thompson was averaging career highs in points (12.0) and rebounds (11.6) through 27 games. However, on December 11, he was ruled out for two to four weeks with a left foot sprain. He returned to action on January 2 against the Miami Heat after missing 10 games. On March 20, against the Milwaukee Bucks, Thompson returned after missing 26 games with a sore left foot.

==== 2019–20 season ====
On January 9, 2020, Thompson scored a career-high 35 points with 14 rebounds in a 115–112 overtime win over the Detroit Pistons. He produced a career-best 12.0 points (51.2% FG), 10.1 rebounds, 2.1 assists, 0.9 blocked shots, and 30.2 minutes in 57 games played (51 starts) with the Cavaliers in 2019–20. He was one of six forwards to average a double-double on at least 50.0% shooting in 2019–20, and the only one of that group to also contribute at least 4.0 offensive boards per contest.

=== Boston Celtics (2020–2021) ===
On November 30, 2020, Thompson signed a two-year, $19 million contract with the Boston Celtics. In 54 games for the Celtics in the 2020–21 season, he averaged 7.6 points and 8.1 rebounds per game.

=== Sacramento Kings (2021–2022) ===
On August 7, 2021, Thompson was traded to the Sacramento Kings in a three-team trade involving the Atlanta Hawks. He appeared in 30 games for the Kings over the first half of the 2021–22 season, averaging a career high 3-point percentage at 1.000%; as well as 6.2 points and 5.4 rebounds per game.

=== Indiana Pacers (2022) ===
On February 8, 2022, Thompson, Tyrese Haliburton, and Buddy Hield were traded to the Indiana Pacers in exchange for Justin Holiday, Jeremy Lamb, Domantas Sabonis, and a 2023 second-round pick. On February 16, Thompson recorded a season-high 17 points along with 6 rebounds and a block in a win over the Washington Wizards. On February 17, after playing four games, the Pacers reached a mutual contract buyout agreement with Thompson.

=== Chicago Bulls (2022) ===
On February 19, 2022, Thompson signed with the Chicago Bulls. He played in 23 games for the Bulls to finish the 2021–22 season.

Thompson spent the 2022–23 season as a free agent after not being re-signed.

=== Los Angeles Lakers (2023) ===
On April 9, 2023, Thompson signed with the Los Angeles Lakers ahead of the 2023 NBA playoffs, reuniting with former Cavs teammate LeBron James. He played in six games for the Lakers during the playoffs, including the May 22, 2023 game where Thompson would dunk the ball with the assist coming from James in a 113–111 loss in the 2023 Conference Finals. This would be Thompson's last game as a Laker.

=== Return to Cleveland (2023–2025) ===
On September 12, 2023, Thompson signed with the Cleveland Cavaliers on a one-year contract. On January 23, 2024, he was suspended for 25 games without pay after testing positive for ibutamoren and SARM LGD-4033. Thomson would end the season going .608% from the field; a career high.

On September 9, 2024, Thompson re-signed with the Cavaliers. In the February 13, 2025 game against the Toronto Raptors, Thompson would come off the bench with four seconds left in the game before proceeding to dunk the basketball, causing an on-court argument. The Cavaliers would go on to win 131–108. Thompson would go on to finish the season averaging 1.7 points per game, 3.4 rebounds per game, and 8.2 minutes per game; all career lows.

== Executive career ==
On August 20, 2026, Thompson joined Dubai Basketball as a global ambassador.

== Career statistics ==
Legend
GP	Games played	GS	Games started	MPG	Minutes per game
FG%	Field goal percentage	3P%	3-point field goal percentage	FT%	Free throw percentage
RPG	Rebounds per game	APG	Assists per game	SPG	Steals per game
BPG	Blocks per game	PPG	Points per game	**Bold**	Career high
†	Won an NBA championship	*	Led the league

=== NBA ===
==== Regular season ====
Year	Team	GP	GS	MPG	FG%	3P%	FT%	RPG	APG	SPG	BPG	PPG
2011–12	Cleveland	60	25	23.7	.439	.000	.552	6.5	.5	.5	1.0	8.2
2012–13	Cleveland	**82***	**82***	31.3	.488	.000	.608	9.4	1.3	**.7**	.9	11.7
2013–14	Cleveland	**82**	**82***	**31.6**	.477	.000	**.693**	9.2	.9	.5	.4	11.7
2014–15	Cleveland	**82**	15	26.8	.547	—	.641	8.0	.5	.4	.7	8.5
2015–16†	Cleveland	**82***	34	27.7	.588	—	.616	9.0	.8	.5	.6	7.9
2016–17	Cleveland	78	78	30.0	.600	.000	.498	9.2	1.0	.5	**1.1**	8.1
2017–18	Cleveland	53	22	20.2	.562	—	.544	6.6	.6	.3	.3	5.8
2018–19	Cleveland	43	40	27.9	.529	—	.642	**10.2**	2.0	**.7**	.4	10.9
2019–20	Cleveland	57	51	30.2	.512	.391	.615	10.1	**2.1**	.6	.9	**12.0**
2020–21	Boston	54	43	23.8	.518	.000	.592	8.1	1.2	.4	.6	7.6
2021–22	Sacramento	30	3	15.2	.503	**1.000**	.533	5.4	.6	.4	.4	6.2
2021–22	Indiana	4	0	16.4	.542	—	.375	4.5	.5	.0	.5	7.3
2021–22	Chicago	23	3	16.3	.565	.000	.542	4.7	.6	.5	.3	5.7
2023–24	Cleveland	49	0	11.2	**.608**	.000	.288	3.6	1.0	.2	.3	3.3
2024–25	Cleveland	40	0	8.2	.437	.000	.233	3.4	.6	.1	.3	1.7
Career		819	478	24.9	.520	.238	.592	7.8	1.0	.5	.6	8.3

==== Playoffs ====
Year	Team	GP	GS	MPG	FG%	3P%	FT%	RPG	APG	SPG	BPG	PPG
2015	Cleveland	20	15	**36.3**	.558	—	.585	**10.8**	.5	.3	**1.2**	9.6
2016†	Cleveland	**21**	**21**	29.6	.527	—	.575	9.0	.7	.4	.9	6.7
2017	Cleveland	18	18	31.2	.587	—	.667	8.3	**1.4**	.5	.7	8.2
2018	Cleveland	19	11	21.9	**.590**	.000	**.741**	5.9	.6	.1	.4	6.2
2021	Boston	5	5	26.4	.588	—	.706	9.8	1.0	**.8**	**1.2**	**10.4**
2022	Chicago	5	0	7.6	.400	—	—	1.6	.4	.2	.0	.8
2023	L.A. Lakers	6	0	5.4	.455	—	.200	1.7	.3	.0	.0	1.8
2024	Cleveland	10	0	8.7	.438	—	.500	2.0	1.0	.1	.5	1.5
2025	Cleveland	3	0	9.7	.500	—	.333	5.0	.3	.3	.7	2.3
Career		107	70	24.7	.557	.000	.613	7.2	.8	.3	.7	6.4

=== College ===
Year	Team	GP	GS	MPG	FG%	3P%	FT%	RPG	APG	SPG	BPG	PPG
2010–11	Texas	36	34	30.7	.546	.000	.487	7.8	1.3	.9	2.4	13.1

== International career ==
Thompson represented his country and Canada Basketball at the FIBA Americas Under-18 Championship in 2008, where Canada won the bronze medal, placing behind Argentina and the United States. Thompson once again competed for Canada at the 2009 FIBA Under-19 World Championship in Auckland, New Zealand.

At the 2013 FIBA Americas Championship, Thompson averaged 11.6 points and 10.0 rebounds per game. He led the 2016 FIBA World Olympic Qualifying Tournament with 33 rebounds, and in 2018, he played one game in a qualifying tournament for the 2019 FIBA World Cup.

== Awards ==
- 2016 NBA champion
- 2012 NBA All-Rookie Second Team
- 2011 NCAA Men's Basketball All-Americans: Associated Press Honorable Mention
- 2011 United States Basketball Writers Association (USBWA) All-District VII Team
- 2011 USBWA Freshman All-America Team
- 2011 All-Big 12 Second Team
- 2011 Big 12 All-Defensive Team
- 2011 Big 12 Freshman of the Year
- 2011 Big 12 All-Freshman Team

== Personal life ==
Thompson is the eldest of four sons to Jamaican parents. His younger brother, Dishawn Thompson, played high school basketball for Wesley Christian High School in Allen, Kentucky, where he was a highly rated prospect.

In 2013, Thompson founded the Amari Thompson Fund, which works closely with Epilepsy Toronto to raise funds and awareness to support those affected by epilepsy. Thompson's youngest brother Amari has Lennox–Gastaut syndrome and experiences seizures almost daily due to his condition.

Thompson also serves as a Global Ambassador for Special Olympics.

In 2020, Thompson acquired American citizenship.

Thompson's mother, Andrea, died in early January 2023 after suffering from a heart attack.

=== Politics ===
In a March 2026 appearance on The Katie Miller Podcast, Thompson said he was "very close with" Eric Trump, describing him as "like a big brother, mentor" who had been "very welcoming." Thompson added that Trump's influence had motivated him to "dive into this realm a little bit more" and said of Donald Trump's immigration approach, "I love what he's done so far for our country," adding that he believed people who immigrate "the right way" should be prioritized. In the same interview, he also said he opposed transgender athletes competing in women's sports, framing the issue as one affecting fairness.

=== Relationships ===
Thompson had a relationship with Jordan Craig, who gave birth to his son Prince in December 2016, by which time they had separated.

Thompson has had an on-again, off-again relationship with Khloé Kardashian. They initially began dating in 2016 when he allegedly cheated on his pregnant ex-girlfriend Jordan Craig with Kardashian, according to court documents. On April 12, 2018, Khloé gave birth to their daughter, True, amidst controversy after Thompson was found to have cheated on Kardashian during the pregnancy. In February 2019, Thompson and Kardashian split after it was revealed that Thompson had allegedly cheated on Kardashian with her younger half-sister Kylie Jenner's then-best friend Jordyn Woods. After quarantining together during the COVID-19 pandemic for the sake of their daughter, they ended up rekindling their relationship in August 2020. They became engaged in February 2021, but split for good in December 2021. In July 2022, it was announced that Kardashian and Thompson were expecting a baby boy via surrogacy. Their son, Tatum, was born on July 28, 2022.

In December 2021, Maralee Nichols gave birth to Thompson's son Theo as a result of an affair they had while he was dating Kardashian. Nichols had filed a paternity lawsuit against Thompson earlier that year. Thompson confirmed the following month that he was the father of Nichols' son and issued an apology to Kardashian.

== See also ==
- List of Canadians in the NBA
- List of people banned or suspended by the NBA
