= 2015 NBA Finals =

2015 basketball championship series

- The wordmark of the NBA Finals (2003–2017)
Team	Coach	Wins
Golden State Warriors	Steve Kerr	4
Cleveland Cavaliers	David Blatt	2
- Dates: June 4–16
- MVP: Andre Iguodala (Golden State Warriors)
- Hall of Famers: Officials: Danny Crawford (2025)
- Eastern finals: Cavaliers defeated Hawks, 4–0
- Western finals: Warriors defeated Rockets, 4–1

The 2015 NBA Finals was the championship series of the National Basketball Association's (NBA) 2014–15 season and the conclusion of the season's playoffs. In this best-of-seven series, the Western Conference champion Golden State Warriors defeated the Eastern Conference champion Cleveland Cavaliers in six games, winning their first championship since 1975, and fourth overall. The Warriors' Andre Iguodala was voted the NBA Finals Most Valuable Player (MVP), after he averaged 16.3 points, 5.8 rebounds, 4.0 assists, and was the main defender on LeBron James for the series. He became the first and only player to win the award without starting every game of the series. Iguodala received seven out 11 votes; the other four went to James, who played in his fifth consecutive Finals appearance. The series began on June 4 and ended on June 16.

In the opening game, the Warriors won in overtime, a game which saw Kyrie Irving's knee injury. In another tight game decided in overtime, the Cavaliers, aided by James's offense, withstood the injuries of the Cavaliers' principal players Irving and Kevin Love and won Game 2 before ultimately taking a 2–1 series lead. Entering Game 4, the Warriors head coach Steve Kerr inserted Iguodala into the starting lineup and moved Draymond Green to the center position. With this new lineup, Warriors went on to win three straight games to clinch the NBA championship.

In a losing effort, James became the first player in NBA Finals history to lead both teams in points, rebounds, and assists for the entire series, after averaging 35.8 points, 13.3 rebounds, and 8.8 assists per game. A first-time NBA champion, Stephen Curry was the last NBA MVP to win an NBA championship in the same season until Shai Gilgeous-Alexander with the Oklahoma City Thunder in 2025.

This was also the last NBA Finals to be played on a Thursday–Sunday–Tuesday scheme, with the schedule format being changed beginning the following Finals.

== Background ==
=== Golden State Warriors ===
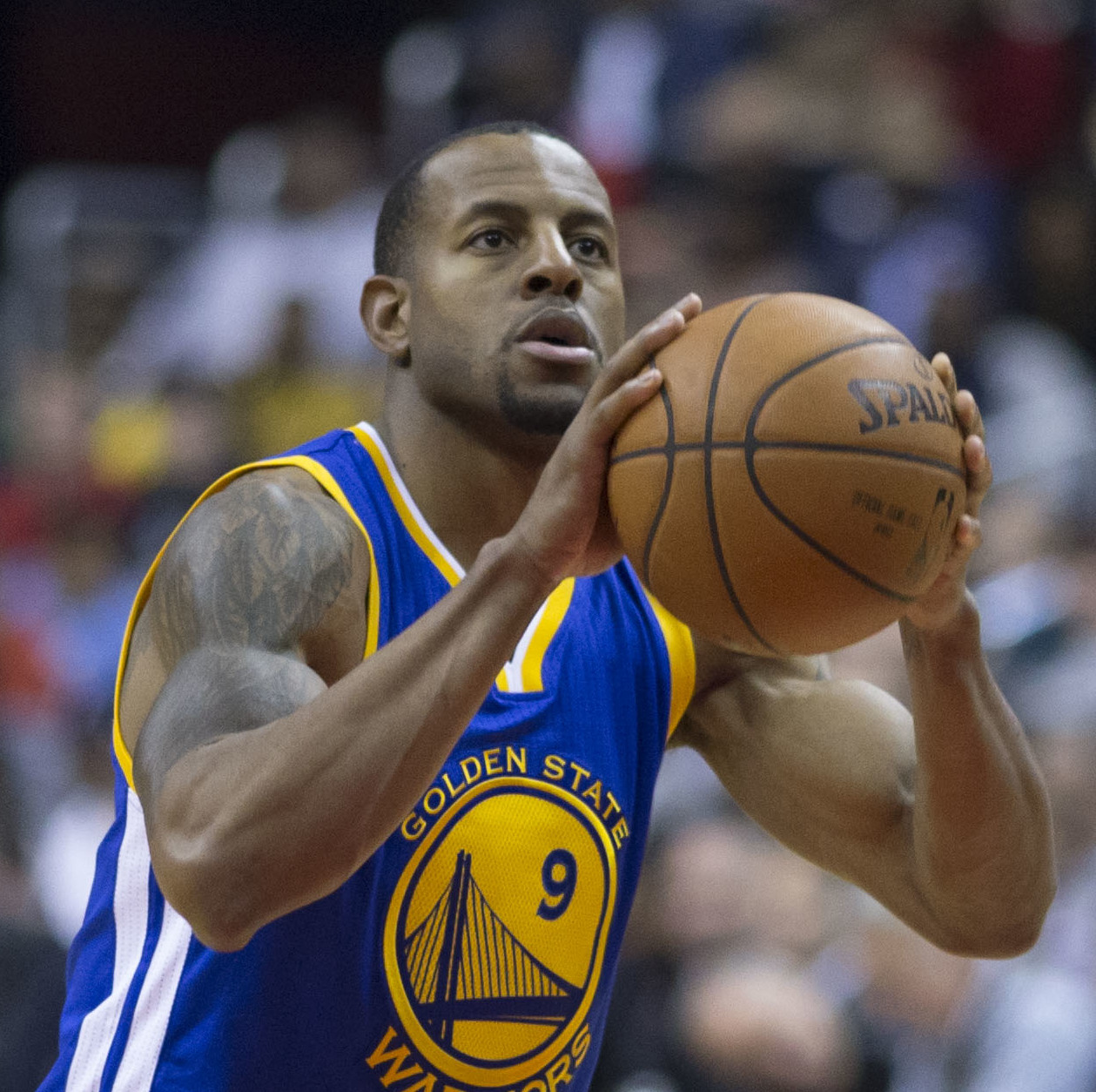
Andre Iguodala moved from starter to sixth man position during the start of the 2014-15 NBA regular season but later became the Finals MVP of the 2015 NBA Finals

The Warriors entered the 2014–15 season after replacing Mark Jackson with Steve Kerr as head coach. This was Kerr's first ever head coaching job. After retiring as a player in 2003, he served as a broadcast analyst from 2003 to 2007 and 2010 to 2014, and as general manager of the Phoenix Suns from 2007 to 2010. Revamping Golden State's offense, Kerr employed elements of the triangle offense from his playing days with the Chicago Bulls under Phil Jackson, the spacing and pace of Gregg Popovich from his playing days in San Antonio with the Spurs, and the up-tempo principles Alvin Gentry used in Phoenix when Kerr was the general manager.

In Kerr's first year, the Warriors finished with the best regular season record at 67–15, including an incredible 39–2 in home games. Kerr became the winningest rookie head coach in NBA history, passing Tom Thibodeau and his 62 wins with the Chicago Bulls in 2010–11. Point guard Stephen Curry set the NBA record for three-pointers made in a regular season with 286, eclipsing his own record set in 2012–13. Curry also won the NBA Most Valuable Player Award for the 2014–15 season. He and fellow guard Klay Thompson, known as the Splash Brothers, finished first and second in the league in three-pointers made, respectively, and combined to make 525 threes, surpassing their previous league record for a duo by 41, while also converting an impressive 44% of those shots. During the season, the backcourt mates both started in the NBA All-Star Game and were each named to the All-NBA team, the first time in decades that either has been achieved by guards on the same team. Golden State advanced to the Finals after sweeping the New Orleans Pelicans in the first round of the playoffs, defeating the Memphis Grizzlies in six games during the second round, and eliminating the Houston Rockets in five games in the conference finals.

=== Cleveland Cavaliers ===
The Cavaliers entered the 2014–15 season after firing Mike Brown and replacing him with David Blatt as head coach, signing free agent forward LeBron James, and trading for forward Kevin Love. James previously played for Cleveland from 2003 to 2010, leading the Cavaliers to their only previous Finals appearance in 2007. James then played for the Miami Heat from 2010 to 2014, leading the Heat to two NBA championships in 2012 and 2013. During the 2014 NBA draft on June 26, 2014, Cleveland held the first overall pick and used it to select Andrew Wiggins. Later on August 23, a three-team trade was completed involving the Cavaliers, the Minnesota Timberwolves, and the Philadelphia 76ers. As part of the deal, Cleveland dealt Wiggins and Anthony Bennett and received Love.

James, Love, and guard Kyrie Irving became known as the Big Three. The Cavaliers got off to a shockingly bad start that led to intense media scrutiny and caused many to question Blatt's job security, going 19–20 in their first 39 games, which included a stretch where they were 2–10 in 12 games, starting with a December 25 road loss to Miami. Injuries to James and "chemistry issues," with James "still learning how to play with his new teammates and vice versa," were considered the primary reasons for the underwhelming start. A number of trades turned the season around. The Cavaliers acquired J.R. Smith and Iman Shumpert from the Knicks in exchange for draft picks while sending Dion Waiters to the Thunder. They then acquired Timofey Mozgov. James's return to the Cavaliers' lineup (following a 2-week layoff) on January 12 completed the turnaround. The Cavaliers closed out the season on a high note, going 34–9 for a 53–29 regular season record and the Central Division title, the second best record in the Eastern Conference behind the Atlanta Hawks. The Cavaliers advanced to the Finals after sweeping the Boston Celtics in the first round of the playoffs, defeating the Chicago Bulls in six games during the second round, and sweeping the Hawks in the conference finals.

=== Road to the Finals ===
Cleveland Cavaliers (Eastern Conference champion)		Golden State Warriors (Western Conference champion)
Eastern Conference: # / Team / W / L / PCT / GB / GP; 1 / c-Atlanta Hawks * / 60 / 22 / .732 / – / 82; 2 / y-Cleveland Cavaliers * / 53 / 29 / .646 / 7.0 / 82; 3 / x-Chicago Bulls / 50 / 32 / .610 / 10.0 / 82; 4 / y-Toronto Raptors * / 49 / 33 / .598 / 11.0 / 82; 5 / x-Washington Wizards / 46 / 36 / .561 / 14.0 / 82; 6 / x-Milwaukee Bucks / 41 / 41 / .500 / 19.0 / 82; 7 / x-Boston Celtics / 40 / 42 / .488 / 20.0 / 82; 8 / x-Brooklyn Nets / 38 / 44 / .463 / 22.0 / 82; 9 / Indiana Pacers / 38 / 44 / .463 / 22.0 / 82; 10 / Miami Heat / 37 / 45 / .451 / 23.0 / 82; 11 / Charlotte Hornets / 33 / 49 / .402 / 27.0 / 82; 12 / Detroit Pistons / 32 / 50 / .390 / 28.0 / 82; 13 / Orlando Magic / 25 / 57 / .305 / 35.0 / 82; 14 / Philadelphia 76ers / 18 / 64 / .220 / 42.0 / 82; 15 / New York Knicks / 17 / 65 / .207 / 43.0 / 82; 2nd seed in the East, 7th best league record	Regular season	Western Conference: # / Team / W / L / PCT / GB / GP; 1 / z-Golden State Warriors * / 67 / 15 / .817 / – / 82; 2 / y-Houston Rockets * / 56 / 26 / .683 / 11.0 / 82; 3 / x-Los Angeles Clippers / 56 / 26 / .683 / 11.0 / 82; 4 / y-Portland Trail Blazers * / 51 / 31 / .622 / 16.0 / 82; 5 / x-Memphis Grizzlies / 55 / 27 / .671 / 12.0 / 82; 6 / x-San Antonio Spurs / 55 / 27 / .671 / 12.0 / 82; 7 / x-Dallas Mavericks / 50 / 32 / .610 / 17.0 / 82; 8 / x-New Orleans Pelicans / 45 / 37 / .549 / 22.0 / 82; 9 / Oklahoma City Thunder / 45 / 37 / .549 / 22.0 / 82; 10 / Phoenix Suns / 39 / 43 / .476 / 28.0 / 82; 11 / Utah Jazz / 38 / 44 / .463 / 29.0 / 82; 12 / Denver Nuggets / 30 / 52 / .366 / 37.0 / 82; 13 / Sacramento Kings / 29 / 53 / .354 / 38.0 / 82; 14 / Los Angeles Lakers / 21 / 61 / .256 / 46.0 / 82; 15 / Minnesota Timberwolves / 16 / 66 / .195 / 51.0 / 82; 1st seed in the West, best league record
Defeated the 7th seeded Boston Celtics, 4–0	First round	Defeated the 8th seeded New Orleans Pelicans, 4–0
Defeated the 3rd seeded Chicago Bulls, 4–2	Conference semifinals	Defeated the 5th seeded Memphis Grizzlies, 4–2
Defeated the 1st seeded Atlanta Hawks, 4–0	Conference finals	Defeated the 2nd seeded Houston Rockets, 4–1

=== Regular season series ===
The Cavaliers and Warriors tied the regular season series 1–1, with each team winning its home game.

January 9, 2015

Recap

Cleveland Cavaliers 94, Golden State Warriors 112

Oracle Arena, Oakland, California

February 26, 2015

Recap

Golden State Warriors 99, Cleveland Cavaliers 110

Quicken Loans Arena, Cleveland, Ohio

== Series summary ==
Game	Date	Road team	Result	Home team
Game 1	June 4	Cleveland Cavaliers	100–108 (OT) (0–1)	Golden State Warriors
Game 2	June 7	Cleveland Cavaliers	95–93 (OT) (1–1)	Golden State Warriors
Game 3	June 9	Golden State Warriors	91–96 (1–2)	Cleveland Cavaliers
Game 4	June 11	Golden State Warriors	103–82 (2–2)	Cleveland Cavaliers
Game 5	June 14	Cleveland Cavaliers	91–104 (2–3)	Golden State Warriors
Game 6	June 16	Golden State Warriors	105–97 (4–2)	Cleveland Cavaliers

== Game summaries ==
For the first time in NBA Finals history, the first two games went into overtime. After Golden State had fallen behind 2–1 in the series, Kerr moved swingman Andre Iguodala into the starting lineup and brought center Andrew Bogut off the bench. The Warriors' small lineup, which came to be known as the Death Lineup, helped turn the series around. Golden State won the series in six games, claiming their first title since 1975 and their fourth in franchise history. The Warriors played small ball in the Finals to a greater extent than any prior champion. Combining regular season and playoff games, Golden State finished 83–20, the third-best record ever behind the Chicago Bulls in 1995–96 (87–13) and 1996–97 (84–17).

Iguodala was named the Finals MVP, becoming the first and only player to win the award without having started every game in the series. He averaged 16.3 points, 5.8 rebounds, and 4.0 assists per game in the series. Iguodala was also tasked with guarding Cleveland star LeBron James, who made only 38.1% of his shots when Iguodala was in the game, but still averaged 35.8 points, 13.3 rebounds, and 8.8 assists per game. James received four of the 11 votes for Finals MVP even though Cleveland lost by an average of 14 points in the final three games. Stephen Curry was just the sixth player to win his first league MVP and his first NBA title in the same season; the last player to accomplish this feat was Shaquille O'Neal in 1999–2000. Kerr became the first rookie coach to win a title since Pat Riley in 1981–82.

The Warriors were the first team since the 1990–91 Bulls to win a title with a roster that did not have any players with Finals experience. James and teammate James Jones made their fifth consecutive trip to the Finals, having qualified the previous four seasons with the Miami Heat, though Jones did not play in the 2011 Finals. It was the first time since 1998 that the Finals did not include the Los Angeles Lakers, San Antonio Spurs, or Heat. This was also the first NBA Finals since then not to have featured Kobe Bryant, Tim Duncan, or Dwyane Wade.

=== Game 1 ===
ABC

June 4
9:00 pm (6:00 pm PDT)

Boxscore

Cleveland Cavaliers 100, Golden State Warriors 108 (OT)
Scoring by quarter: 29–19, 22–29, 22–25, 25–25, Overtime: 2–10
Pts: LeBron James 44; Rebs: Tristan Thompson 15; Asts: Irving, James 6 each	Pts: Stephen Curry 26; Rebs: Andrew Bogut 7 Asts: Stephen Curry 8
Golden State leads series, 1–0

Oracle Arena, Oakland, California
Attendance: 19,596
Referees:
- No. 13 Monty McCutchen
- No. 19 James Capers
- No. 23 Jason Phillips

The Warriors defeated the Cavaliers 108–100 in overtime, taking Game 1 and the 1–0 series lead. The Cavaliers got off to a strong start, opening up a 29–15 lead before settling for a 10-point lead after the first quarter. In the second quarter, the Warriors went on a big run and led 46–41. Cleveland then went on a 10–2 run to close out the first half, capped off by a J. R. Smith three-pointer with .7 seconds left to take a 51–48 halftime lead. The second half was a back-and-forth affair, with neither team able to gain separation. Late in the fourth quarter, Timofey Mozgov hit two free throws to tie the game at 98. Golden State ran a play for Stephen Curry out of a timeout. Curry beat Kyrie Irving to the basket and went for a go-ahead layup, but Irving blocked the shot, and the Cavaliers called timeout after Smith secured the rebound. The Cavaliers had two chances to win in the final seconds of regulation. James' potential game-winning jumper was off, and then Iman Shumpert got the offensive rebound and threw a shot at the buzzer, but also missed, sending the game to overtime. In overtime, the Warriors dominated with a 10–0 run consisting of seven free throws and a three-pointer by Barnes. Cleveland's only score in the extra period was James' layup with 9.5 seconds left as the Cavaliers shot 1/12 and committed 3 turnovers in the game's final 5 minutes.

Only three players scored for the Cavaliers after halftime: James, Irving, and Mozgov. The trio combined for 83 of the Cavaliers' 100 points. James had a career NBA Finals high of 44 points, while attempting a postseason career-high 38 shots, and Curry led Golden State with 26 points. The Warriors' bench outplayed the Cavaliers' bench, outscoring them 34–9, with all nine Cavaliers bench points coming from Smith. Andre Iguodala led the Warriors' bench in scoring with 15 points. Irving suffered a knee injury in overtime and was forced to leave the game early. The following day, he was diagnosed with a fractured left kneecap that would require surgery and was ruled out for the rest of the Finals, joining Kevin Love, who suffered a dislocated shoulder against the Celtics in the first round of the playoffs, and Anderson Varejão.

=== Game 2 ===
ABC

June 7
8:00 pm (5:00 pm PDT)

Boxscore

Cleveland Cavaliers 95, Golden State Warriors 93 (OT)
Scoring by quarter: 20–20, 27–25, 15–14, 25–28, Overtime: 8–6
Pts: LeBron James 39; Rebs: LeBron James 16; Asts: LeBron James 11	Pts: Klay Thompson 34; Rebs: Green, Bogut 10 each Asts: Curry, Iguodala 5 each
Series tied, 1–1

Oracle Arena, Oakland, California
Attendance: 19,596
Referees:
- No. 48 Scott Foster
- No. 25 Tony Brothers
- No. 28 Zach Zarba

The Cavaliers defeated the Warriors 95–93 in overtime, tying the series at 1–1 and stealing homecourt advantage heading into Cleveland. For the first time in NBA Finals history, the first two games were decided in overtime, with the Cavaliers winning their first Finals game in franchise history. LeBron James tallied his fifth Finals triple-double with 39 points, 16 rebounds, and 11 assists while moving solely into second all-time in Finals triple-doubles behind Magic Johnson's eight. James, who shot 11-for-35 in the game, played 50 minutes and led all scorers. James either scored or assisted on 66 of Cleveland's 95 points, and his 83 points in the first two games of a Finals was also second all-time to Jerry West's 94 in the 1969 Finals. Klay Thompson led the Warriors with 34 points. Curry added 19, but he struggled mightily against the Cavaliers' defense, shooting 5-for-23 from the floor, including 2-of-15 from three-point range. Curry set an NBA record for most missed three-point attempts in an NBA Finals game with 13. Matthew Dellavedova's defense on Curry was huge as Curry was 0–for-8 against him.

The margin was close through the first three quarters, with neither team leading by more than eight points. The Warriors jumped out to a 20–12 lead, but the Cavaliers closed the quarter on an 8–0 run to tie the game at 20. The Warriors led 31–25 early in the second quarter, but the Cavaliers went on a 15–2 run to take a 40–33 lead. They settled for a two-point lead at halftime, leading 47–45. The third quarter was low scoring, with the Cavaliers scoring 15 points and the Warriors 14 points. Heading into the fourth quarter, the Cavaliers led 62–59. After three tight quarters, the Cavaliers began to pull away, building an 83–72 lead with just over three minutes remaining in the fourth. However, the Cavaliers squandered the 11-point lead as the Warriors went on a 15–4 run to tie the game at 87, capped off by a Curry finger roll layup with eight seconds remaining. Out of a timeout, James drove towards the basket as he went for a game winning layup, but he misfired, and the rebound tip back attempt by Tristan Thompson was unsuccessful.

In overtime, Iman Shumpert hit a three-pointer, and James made two free throws, giving the Cavaliers a 92–87 lead. However, Draymond Green answered with back-to-back baskets, and Curry hit two free throws to give the Warriors a 93–92 lead. Out of the timeout, James' go-ahead layup was blocked by Green and recovered by Andre Iguodala, but he threw it out of bounds, giving possession back to the Cavaliers. The ensuing Cavaliers possession resulted in a three-point attempt by James Jones which missed, but Dellavedova grabbed the offensive rebound and was fouled. Dellavedova hit both free throws to give the Cavaliers a 94–93 lead with 10.1 seconds remaining. After a timeout, the Warriors went to Curry, who airballed the potential go-ahead jumper. James rebounded the miss and was fouled.

James hit one of two at the line, giving the Cavaliers a 95–93 lead with four seconds left in overtime. With no timeouts remaining, the Warriors had to go the length of the court to get off a game-tying or game-winning shot attempt. However, Curry's pass near midcourt was stolen by Tristan Thompson, and the Cavaliers ran out the clock. After getting badly outplayed in Game 1, the Cavaliers' bench outscored the Warriors 21–17 in Game 2. The Cavaliers handed the Warriors their fourth home loss of the season (including the postseason) and were only the second Eastern Conference team to win at Oracle Arena (the Chicago Bulls also won in overtime on January 27). The victory for Cleveland was their first ever single game Finals victory, having lost Game 1 of this series, and being swept in the 2007 Finals by the San Antonio Spurs.

Following the game, James had dubbed the undermanned Cavaliers as "The Grit Squad", due to adopting a slower-paced, more physical style of play in the absence of All-Stars Irving and Kevin Love. This new moniker was quickly embraced by Cavaliers fans, in hopes that this new tough style of play would be enough to offset the Warriors' depth advantage.

=== Game 3 ===
ABC

June 9
9:00 pm

Boxscore

Golden State Warriors 91, Cleveland Cavaliers 96
Scoring by quarter: 20–24, 17–20, 18–28, 36–24
Pts: Stephen Curry 27; Rebs: Ezeli, Green 7 each Asts: Stephen Curry 6	Pts: LeBron James 40; Rebs: Tristan Thompson 13; Asts: LeBron James 8
Cleveland leads series, 2–1

Quicken Loans Arena, Cleveland, Ohio
Attendance: 20,562
Referees:
- No. 43 Danny Crawford
- No. 8 Marc Davis
- No. 9 Derrick Stafford

The Cavaliers led wire to wire as they defeated the Warriors 96–91 and took a 2–1 series lead. The first half was close throughout, with the Cavaliers leading 24–20 after the first quarter. They led 44–37 at halftime. Stephen Curry's struggles in Game 2 carried over to the first half of this game as he was held to three points in the first half. In the third quarter, the Cavaliers seized control, outscoring the Warriors 28–18. They led by as many as 20 in the third quarter before taking a 72–55 lead heading into the fourth quarter. The 55 points scored by the Warriors was their lowest scoring output through three quarters all season, but the Warriors fought back, making it a one-point game as they cut the deficit to 81–80 late in the fourth quarter. However, Matthew Dellavedova banked in a circus shot as he tumbled to the floor while being fouled by Curry. He made the free throw to put the Cavaliers up 84–80. After Curry committed a turnover, LeBron James hit a three-pointer to give the Cavaliers an 87–80 lead. Curry hit a handful of three-pointers down the stretch, but the Cavs made their free throws and closed out the win.

James led all scorers with 40 to go along with 12 rebounds, eight assists, and four steals. Through three games, James scored 123 points, the most points scored by any player in the first three games of any NBA Finals series, surpassing Rick Barry's 122 from the 1967 NBA Finals. Dellavedova scored 20, a playoff career high. Curry led the Warriors with 27 points, 17 of which came in the fourth quarter. This win marks the first time that the Cavaliers held a lead in an NBA Finals series in their franchise history, as well as their first home win in an NBA Finals series in their franchise history.

=== Game 4 ===
ABC

June 11
9:00 pm

Boxscore

Golden State Warriors 103, Cleveland Cavaliers 82
Scoring by quarter: 31–24, 23–18, 22–28, 27–12
Pts: Curry, Iguodala 22 each Rebs: Iguodala, Barnes, Livingston 8 each Asts: Curry 7	Pts: Timofey Mozgov 28; Rebs: Tristan Thompson 13; Asts: LeBron James 8
Series tied, 2–2

Quicken Loans Arena, Cleveland, Ohio
Attendance: 20,562
Referees:
- No. 17 Joe Crawford
- No. 24 Mike Callahan
- No. 41 Ken Mauer

The Warriors routed the Cavaliers 103–82 in Game 4, evening the series at 2–2 and reclaiming homecourt advantage. Despite stating that there would be no changes to the starting lineup on the morning of Game 4, Kerr inserted Andre Iguodala into the starting lineup in place of Andrew Bogut, while moving Draymond Green to the center position. The Cavaliers scored the first seven points of the game and led 16–9, but the Warriors closed out the first quarter on a 22–8 run to lead 31–24. In the second quarter, the Cavaliers got a scare when LeBron James suffered a laceration on his head from a courtside photographer's camera lens after a hard foul on Bogut, but James stayed in the game without any stitches. The Warriors outscored the Cavaliers 23–18 in that period and led 54–42 at halftime. The Cavaliers outscored the Warriors 28–22 in the third quarter as they cut a 15-point deficit down to three in two instances. The Cavaliers had it down to 65–62, but Harrison Barnes hit a three-pointer out of the timeout to stop the run.

With the Warriors leading 73–70 late in the third quarter, Stephen Curry hit a three to give Golden State a 76–70 lead heading into the fourth quarter. The Warriors dominated the final period, leading by as many as 23 as they outscored the Cavaliers 27–12. The Cavaliers shot 4-for-27 from behind the three-point line for the game and were 6-of-45 outside the paint, a season worst. The 82 points that the Cavaliers scored were a postseason low while the Cavaliers' bench scoring production (seven points) was also a postseason low. Curry and Iguodala led the Warriors in scoring with 22 apiece. Timofey Mozgov led the Cavaliers with 28. After averaging 41 points in the first three games of the Finals, James was held to 20 points on 7-of-22 shooting. After the game, Kerr admitted to his deception regarding the starting lineup, quipping, "I don't think they hand you the trophy based on morality."

=== Game 5 ===
ABC

June 14
8:00 pm (5:00 pm PDT)

Boxscore

Cleveland Cavaliers 91, Golden State Warriors 104
Scoring by quarter: 22–22, 28–29, 17–22, 24–31
Pts: LeBron James 40; Rebs: LeBron James 14; Asts: LeBron James 11	Pts: Stephen Curry 37; Rebs: Harrison Barnes 9 Asts: Andre Iguodala 7
Golden State leads series, 3–2

Oracle Arena, Oakland, California
Attendance: 19,596
Referees:
- No. 13 Monty McCutchen
- No. 19 James Capers
- No. 23 Jason Phillips

Coming into this game with the series tied at 2 games apiece, the Game 5 winner had gone on to win the NBA championship in 20 of the previous 28 instances.

The Warriors defeated the Cavaliers 104–91 and took a 3–2 series lead heading back to Cleveland. The first three quarters were tight, with neither team leading by more than seven points, and both teams scored 22 points in the first quarter. The Warriors led 51–50 at halftime on a Harrison Barnes' three-point play following a dunk. They took a six-point lead heading into the fourth quarter, leading 73–67. The Cavaliers opened the fourth quarter on a 13–6 run. LeBron James' deep three-pointer gave the Cavaliers an 80–79 lead with just over 7:30 remaining in the fourth quarter. However, the Warriors responded with a huge run, outscoring the Cavaliers 25–11 the rest of the way. Curry scored 37 points on 13–23 shooting in the victory, including 7-of-13 from three-point range. 17 of his 37 points came in the fourth quarter.

James had his second triple-double of this NBA Finals series, posting 40 points, 14 rebounds, and 11 assists. James led all players in points, rebounds and assists, and was responsible for 70 of 91 Cavaliers points (40 scored, 30 assisted). It was his sixth career finals triple double, second all-time behind only Magic Johnson with eight. James also tied Oscar Robertson for most 30–10–10 playoff games with eight. James became the second player in NBA Finals history to score 40 points in a triple double after Jerry West in 1969.

=== Game 6 ===
ABC

June 16
9:00 pm

Boxscore

Golden State Warriors 105, Cleveland Cavaliers 97
Scoring by quarter: 28–15, 17–28, 28–18, 32–36
Pts: Curry, Iguodala 25 each Rebs: Draymond Green 11; Asts: Draymond Green 10	Pts: LeBron James 32; Rebs: LeBron James 18; Asts: LeBron James 9
Golden State wins NBA Finals, 4–2

Quicken Loans Arena, Cleveland, Ohio
Attendance: 20,562
Referees:
- No. 48 Scott Foster
- No. 8 Marc Davis
- No. 28 Zach Zarba

The Warriors finished off the Cavaliers 105–97, winning the series 4–2. The Warriors outscored the Cavaliers 28–15 in the first quarter, but the Cavaliers went on a big run to cut the deficit to 2 at halftime, trailing 45–43. The Cavaliers led 47–45 early in the third quarter, their only lead of the second half. However, the Warriors outscored the Cavaliers 28–18 in the third quarter, leading by as many 15 before taking a 12-point lead into the fourth, leading 73–61. In the fourth quarter, Cleveland cut the deficit down to seven, but Golden State pushed the lead back to 15. The Cavaliers, led by J.R. Smith, made a late surge to cut it to 4 with under 40 seconds remaining. However, the Warriors hit their free throws and closed out the series, giving the franchise their first title since 1975, and the city of Oakland its first major league sports championship since the Oakland Athletics won the 1989 World Series. Andre Iguodala, who did not start for the Warriors until Game 4 of the Finals, was named the Finals MVP for his instrumental defense against LeBron James, who led the Cavaliers with 32 points. Iguodala had the third lowest scoring average of any Finals MVP in NBA history. James became the youngest player to score 5,000 career points in the playoffs.

== Rosters ==
=== Golden State Warriors ===
2014–15 Golden State Warriors roster
Players

Pos.	No.	Player	Height	Weight	DOB	From
G	19	Leandro Barbosa	6 ft 3 in (1.91 m)	194 lb (88 kg)	1982–11–28	Brazil
F	40	Harrison Barnes	6 ft 8 in (2.03 m)	225 lb (102 kg)	1992–05–30	North Carolina
C	12	Andrew Bogut	7 ft 0 in (2.13 m)	260 lb (118 kg)	1984–11–28	Utah
G	30	Stephen Curry	6 ft 3 in (1.91 m)	190 lb (86 kg)	1988–03–14	Davidson
C	31	Festus Ezeli	6 ft 11 in (2.11 m)	255 lb (116 kg)	1989–10–21	Vanderbilt
F	23	Draymond Green	6 ft 7 in (2.01 m)	230 lb (104 kg)	1990–03–04	Michigan State
G/F	7	Justin Holiday	6 ft 6 in (1.98 m)	185 lb (84 kg)	1989–04–05	Washington
G/F	9	Andre Iguodala	6 ft 6 in (1.98 m)	215 lb (98 kg)	1984–01–28	Arizona
C	1	Ognjen Kuzmić	7 ft 1 in (2.16 m)	260 lb (118 kg)	1990–05–16	Serbia
F/C	10	David Lee	6 ft 9 in (2.06 m)	245 lb (111 kg)	1983–04–29	Florida
G	34	Shaun Livingston	6 ft 7 in (2.01 m)	182 lb (83 kg)	1985–09–11	Peoria Central HS (IL)
F	20	James Michael McAdoo	6 ft 9 in (2.06 m)	230 lb (104 kg)	1993–01–04	North Carolina
G/F	4	Brandon Rush	6 ft 6 in (1.98 m)	220 lb (100 kg)	1985–07–07	Kansas
F/C	5	Marreese Speights	6 ft 10 in (2.08 m)	255 lb (116 kg)	1987–08–04	Florida
G	11	Klay Thompson	6 ft 7 in (2.01 m)	215 lb (98 kg)	1990–02–08	Washington State

Coaches
Head coach
- Steve Kerr
Assistant(s)
- Ron Adams
- Alvin Gentry
- Luke Walton
- Jarron Collins (player development)
- Bruce Fraser (player development)
- Keke Lyles (player performance)

Legend
- (DP) Unsigned draft pick
- (FA) Free agent
- (S) Suspended
- (DL) On assignment to D-League affiliate
- Injured

Roster

=== Cleveland Cavaliers ===
2014–15 Cleveland Cavaliers roster
Players

Pos.	No.	Player	Height	Weight	DOB	From
G	8	Matthew Dellavedova	6 ft 4 in (1.93 m)	200 lb (91 kg)	1990–09–08	Saint Mary's
G	12	Joe Harris	6 ft 6 in (1.98 m)	215 lb (98 kg)	1991–09–06	Virginia
C	33	Brendan Haywood	7 ft 0 in (2.13 m)	263 lb (119 kg)	1979–11–27	North Carolina
G	2	Kyrie Irving	6 ft 3 in (1.91 m)	193 lb (88 kg)	1992–03–23	Duke
F	23	LeBron James	6 ft 8 in (2.03 m)	250 lb (113 kg)	1984–12–30	St. Vincent–St. Mary HS (OH)
G/F	1	James Jones	6 ft 8 in (2.03 m)	215 lb (98 kg)	1980–10–04	Miami (FL)
F/C	0	Kevin Love	6 ft 10 in (2.08 m)	243 lb (110 kg)	1988–09–07	UCLA
F	31	Shawn Marion	6 ft 7 in (2.01 m)	228 lb (103 kg)	1978–05–07	UNLV
G/F	18	Mike Miller	6 ft 8 in (2.03 m)	218 lb (99 kg)	1980–02–19	Florida
C	20	Timofey Mozgov	7 ft 1 in (2.16 m)	250 lb (113 kg)	1986–07–16	Russia
C	3	Kendrick Perkins	6 ft 10 in (2.08 m)	270 lb (122 kg)	1984–11–10	Clifton J. Ozen (TX)
G	4	Iman Shumpert	6 ft 5 in (1.96 m)	220 lb (100 kg)	1990–06–26	Georgia Tech
G/F	5	J. R. Smith	6 ft 6 in (1.98 m)	220 lb (100 kg)	1985–09–09	St. Benedict's Prep (NJ)
F/C	13	Tristan Thompson	6 ft 9 in (2.06 m)	238 lb (108 kg)	1991–03–13	Texas
F/C	17	Anderson Varejão	6 ft 11 in (2.11 m)	267 lb (121 kg)	1982–09–28	Brazil

Coaches
Head coach
- David Blatt
Assistant(s)
- Jim Boylan
- Bret Brielmaier
- Larry Drew
- James Posey
- Tyronn Lue (associate head coach)
- Phil Handy (player development)
- Vitaly Potapenko (player development)
- Damon Jones (shooting consultant)

Legend
- (DP) Unsigned draft pick
- (FA) Free agent
- (S) Suspended
- (DL) On assignment to D-League affiliate
- Injured

Roster

== Player statistics ==
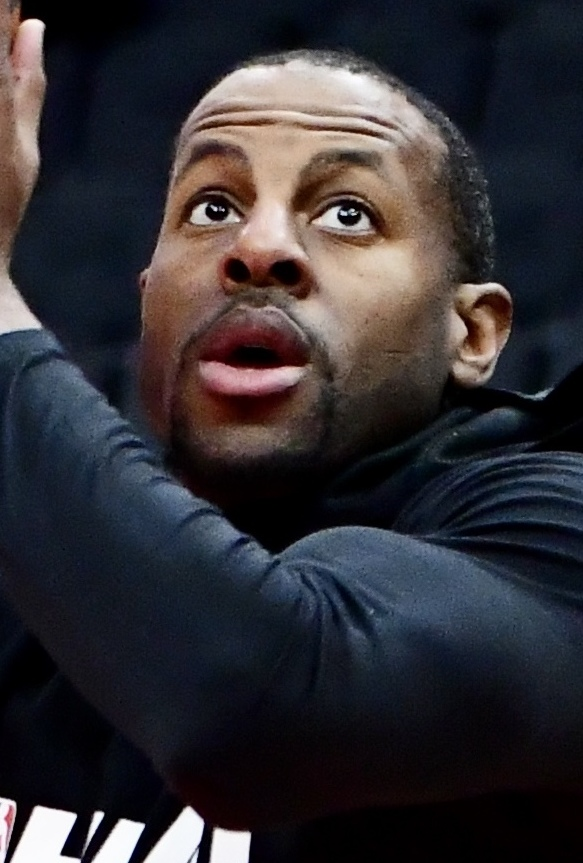
Andre Iguodala, 2015 NBA Finals MVP

Legend
GP	Games played	GS	Games started	MPG	Minutes per game
FG%	Field-goal percentage	3P%	3-point field-goal percentage	FT%	Free-throw percentage
RPG	Rebounds per game	APG	Assists per game	SPG	Steals per game
BPG	Blocks per game	PPG	Points per game

Golden State Warriors

Golden State Warriors statistics
Player	GP	GS	MPG	FG%	3P%	FT%	RPG	APG	SPG	BPG	PPG
Leandro Barbosa	6	0	10.7	.462	.429	1.000	1.7	0.5	0.5	0.2	5.2
Harrison Barnes	6	6	32.9	.373	.421	.778	5.8	0.8	0.8	0.5	8.8
Andrew Bogut	4	3	18.4	.444	.000	.500	6.0	1.5	0.3	1.3	2.5
Stephen Curry	6	6	42.5	.443	.385	.885	5.2	6.3	1.8	0.2	26.0
Festus Ezeli	5	0	10.0	.467	.000	.727	3.4	0.4	0.0	0.6	4.4
Draymond Green	6	6	37.0	.381	.263	.735	8.3	5.0	2.2	1.2	13.0
Justin Holiday	1	0	2.1	.000	.000	.000	0.0	0.0	0.0	0.0	0.0
Andre Iguodala	6	3	37.1	.521	.400	.357	5.8	4.0	1.3	0.3	16.3
David Lee	4	0	9.7	.533	.000	.545	2.5	1.5	0.3	0.0	5.5
Shaun Livingston	6	0	20.1	.480	.000	.750	3.5	2.2	0.3	0.3	5.0
James Michael McAdoo	1	0	1.2	.000	.000	.000	1.0	0.0	0.0	0.0	0.0
Marreese Speights	3	0	5.3	.308	.000	.500	1.7	0.3	0.3	0.0	3.0
Klay Thompson	6	6	37.9	.409	.300	.917	4.3	1.7	0.5	1.0	15.8

Cleveland Cavaliers

Cleveland Cavaliers statistics
Player	GP	GS	MPG	FG%	3P%	FT%	RPG	APG	SPG	BPG	PPG
Matthew Dellavedova	6	5	31.8	.283	.231	.818	2.7	2.7	1.2	0.0	7.5
Joe Harris	2	0	1.6	.000	.000	.500	0.0	0.0	0.0	0.0	0.5
Kyrie Irving	1	1	43.6	.455	.250	1.000	7.0	6.0	4.0	2.0	23.0
LeBron James	6	6	45.7	.398	.310	.687	13.3	8.8	1.3	0.5	35.8
James Jones	6	0	18.8	.316	.308	1.000	1.3	0.3	0.7	0.2	3.3
Mike Miller	5	0	5.7	.500	.500	.000	0.2	0.0	0.2	0.0	0.6
Timofey Mozgov	6	6	28.3	.551	.000	.750	7.5	1.0	0.5	1.5	14.0
Kendrick Perkins	1	0	3.1	.000	.000	1.000	1.0	0.0	0.0	0.0	2.0
Iman Shumpert	6	6	35.9	.256	.320	.643	3.8	0.7	1.8	0.7	6.5
J. R. Smith	6	0	33.6	.312	.294	.600	4.3	1.0	0.5	0.8	11.5
Tristan Thompson	6	6	41.1	.500	.000	.600	13.0	0.3	0.7	1.0	10.0

== Broadcast ==
In the United States, the 2015 NBA Finals aired on ABC (including the local affiliates WEWS-TV in Cleveland and KGO-TV in San Francisco/Oakland) with Mike Breen as play-by-play commentator, and Mark Jackson and Jeff Van Gundy serving as color commentators. ESPN Radio aired it as well and had Mike Tirico and Hubie Brown as commentators. ESPN Deportes provided exclusive Spanish-language coverage of The Finals, with a commentary team of Álvaro Martín and Carlos Morales.

Game	Ratings (households)	American audience (in millions)
1	10.6	17.77
2	10.8	19.17
3	11.1	18.77
4	11.7	19.84
5	11.8	20.86
6	13.4	23.25
Avg	11.6	19.94

== See also ==
- Death Lineup
- Cavaliers–Warriors rivalry
- Cleveland sports curse
