= Lester J. Reed =

American biochemist

Lester J. Reed (January 3, 1925, New Orleans, Louisiana – January 14, 2015) was an American biochemist, having been the Ashbel Smith Professor Emeritus at University of Texas at Austin (UTA), and also a National Academy of Sciences member. He received his Bachelor of Science from Tulane University in 1943, where he worked with William Shive, and earned his doctorate from the University of Illinois in 1946 at the age of 21. He then moved to Cornell University Medical School for a two-year postdoctorate in the laboratory of Vincent du Vigneaud from 1946 to 1948. Having worked at UTA since 1948, the Lester J. Reed Professorship was named in his honor in 1997 and the current holder is Dean R. Appling. In 1977, he was given an honorary doctorate from Tulane University.
