= 2010 McDonald's All-American Boys Game =

American high school basketball game

West	East
107	104
	1st half	2nd half	Total
West	51	56	107
East	59	45	104
- Date: March 31, 2010
- Venue: Value City Arena, Columbus, Ohio
- MVP: Harrison Barnes, Jared Sullinger
- Referees: Ric Bryant; Kevin Johnson; Dennis Morris
- Network: ESPN
- Announcers: Jay Williams; Bob Wischusen; Quint Kessenich

McDonald's All-American

The 2010 McDonald's All-American Boys Game was an All-star basketball game played on Wednesday, March 31, 2010, at the Value City Arena in Columbus, Ohio, home of the Ohio State Buckeyes. The game's rosters featured the best and most highly recruited high school boys graduating in 2010. The game was the 33rd annual version of the McDonald's All-American Game first played in 1978.

The 48 players were selected from 2,500 nominees by a committee of basketball experts. They were chosen not only for their on-court skills, but for their performances off the court as well. Coach Morgan Wootten, who had more than 1,200 wins as head basketball coach at DeMatha High School, was chairman of the selection committee. Legendary UCLA coach John Wooden, who has been involved in the McDonald's All American Games since its inception, served as chairman of the Games and as an advisor to the selection committee.

Proceeds from the 2010 McDonald's All American High School Basketball Games went to Ronald McDonald House Charities (RMHC) of Central Ohio and its Ronald McDonald House program.

== 2010 Game ==
The 2010 game was played at Ohio State University's Value City Arena in Columbus, Ohio on March 31, 2010.

=== 2010 West Roster ===
ESPN 100 Rank	Name	Height (ft–in)	Weight (lb)	Position	Hometown	High school	College choice
27	Keith Appling	6–2	180	SG	Detroit, MI	Pershing High School	Michigan State
1	Harrison Barnes	6–8	209	SF	Ames, IA	Ames High School	North Carolina
9	Terrence Jones	6–9	230	SF	Portland, OR	Jefferson High School	Kentucky
16	Cory Joseph	6–3	180	PG	Toronto, Canada	Findlay Prep	Texas
4	Brandon Knight	6–3	183	PG	Coral Springs, FL	Pine Crest School	Kentucky
29	Doron Lamb	6–4	183	SG	Laurelton, NY	Oak Hill Academy	Kentucky
17	Ray McCallum Jr.	6–1	179	PG	Detroit, MI	Detroit Country Day School	Detroit
14	Fab Melo	7–0	274	C	Juiz de Fora, Brazil	Sagemont School	Syracuse
23	Jereme Richmond	6–7	195	SF	Waukegan, IL	Waukegan High School	Illinois
20	Joshua Smith	6–9	320	C	Kent, WA	Kentwood High School	UCLA
10	Tristan Thompson	6–9	235	PF	Brampton, Canada	Findlay Prep	Texas
13	Patric Young	6–9	220	PF	Jacksonville, FL	Providence School	Florida

=== 2010 East Roster ===
ESPN 100 Rank	Name	Height (ft–in)	Weight (lb)	Position	Hometown	High school	College choice
18	Reggie Bullock	6–6	190	SG	Kinston, NC	Kinston High School	North Carolina
6	Tobias Harris	6–8	210	PF	Islip, NY	Half Hollow Hills High School	Tennessee
3	Kyrie Irving	6–2	172	PG	West Orange, NJ	St. Patrick High School	Duke
21	Daniel Palka	6–2	225	PG	Greer, SC	Greer High School	Georgia Tech
7	Perry Jones	6–11	220	PF	Duncanville, TX	Duncanville High School	Baylor
44	Jelan Kendrick	6–5	186	SG	Marietta, GA	Joseph Wheeler High School	Memphis
11	C. J. Leslie	6–9	205	PF	Raleigh, NC	Word of God Christian Academy	NC State
22	Kendall Marshall	6–4	180	PG	Dumfries, VA	Bishop O'Connell High School	North Carolina
62	JayVaughn Pinkston	6–6	220	PF	Brownsville, NY	Bishop Loughlin High School	Villanova
5	Josh Selby	6–3	183	PG	Baltimore, MD	Lake Clifton High School	Kansas
2	Jared Sullinger	6–8	262	C	Columbus, OH	Northland High School	Ohio State
12	Deshaun Thomas	6–7	221	SF	Fort Wayne, IN	Bishop Luers High School	Ohio State

=== Coaches ===
The West team was coached by:

- Co-Head Coach Hunter Kalman of St. Edward High School (Lakewood, Ohio)
- Co-Head Coach Thurnis Wallace of Lyons Creek Middle School (Coconut Creek, Florida)
- Asst Coach Jim Flannery of St. Edward High School (Lakewood, Ohio)

The East team was coached by:

- Co-Head Coach Dru Joyce II of St. Vincent - St. Mary High School (Akron, Ohio)
- Co-Head Coach Norm Persin of Oak Hill High School (Oak Hill, Ohio)
- Asst Coach Matt Futch of St. Vincent - St. Mary High School (Akron, Ohio)

=== Boxscore ===
==== Visitors: West ====
##	Player	FGM/A	3PM/A	FTM/A	Points	Off Reb	Def Reb	Tot Reb	PF	Ast	TO	BS	ST	Min
1	*Terrence Jones	7/11	0/ 1	0/ 1	14	2	1	3	0	0	0	0	1	14
11	*Brandon Knight	3/11	1/ 7	2/ 3	9	0	2	2	0	2	1	0	1	20
13	*Fab Melo	1/ 3	0/ 0	0/ 0	2	1	6	7	5	4	4	3	2	19
20	*Doron Lamb	6/11	0/ 2	0/ 0	12	2	0	2	1	0	1	0	0	14
40	*Harrison Barnes	7/10	1/ 3	3/ 3	18	2	3	5	1	1	2	0	0	22
3	Ray McCallum	2/ 7	0/ 2	0/ 0	4	1	1	2	0	3	0	0	1	15
5	Cory Joseph	1/ 6	0/ 1	0/ 0	2	0	2	2	0	2	2	0	2	14
12	Tristan Thompson	4/ 7	0/ 0	0/ 0	8	3	2	5	1	1	3	0	1	17
21	Patric Young	3/ 4	0/ 0	1/ 2	7	3	6	9	1	1	2	0	0	15
22	Jereme Richmond	5/ 7	0/ 0	1/ 2	11	2	1	3	1	2	0	0	0	18
32	Keith Appling	4/15	2/ 9	0/ 0	10	1	1	2	1	2	1	0	0	17
34	Joshua Smith	4/ 5	0/ 0	2/ 2	10	4	2	6	1	0	1	0	1	15
	Team					1	1	2						
	TOTALS	47/ 97	4/25	9/13	107	22	28	50	12	18	17	3	9	200

==== Home: East ====
##	Player	FGM/A	3PM/A	FTM/A	Points	Off Reb	Def Reb	Tot Reb	PF	Ast	TO	BS	ST	Min
1	*John Adams	9/11	0/ 5	1/ 2	19	2	5	9	1	3	1	0	0	22
11	*Kyrie Irving	5/ 8	1/ 1	2/ 2	13	1	1	2	1	2	3	0	3	18
31	*Tobias Harris	6/ 7	1/ 1	0/ 0	13	2	2	4	0	2	3	0	0	12
34	*Jared Sullinger	7/11	2/ 3	6/ 6	22	1	6	7	3	2	0	1	3	24
35	*Reggie Bullock	3/ 6	0/ 2	0/ 0	6	2	4	6	1	1	1	0	1	17
0	Jelan Kendrick	2/ 3	0/ 1	1/ 2	5	0	1	1	1	0	3	1	0	11
3	Perry Jones III	3/ 4	0/ 0	0/ 0	6	0	0	0	1	0	0	0	0	15
4	Daniel Palka	0/ 1	0/ 0	2/ 2	2	1	0	1	1	2	1	0	0	12
5	CJ Leslie	3/ 6	0/ 1	1/ 2	7	2	7	9	0	1	2	1	0	17
12	Kendall Marshall	0/ 2	0/ 1	2/ 2	2	0	1	1	0	5	2	0	1	14
24	JayVaughn Pinkston	2/ 8	0/ 2	0/ 1	4	1	1	2	1	0	2	0	0	16
32	Josh Selby	6/10	0/ 1	1/ 2	13	1	1	2	1	3	3	0	0	22
	Team					1	1	2						
	TOTALS	42/ 80	4/18	16/21	104	14	30	44	10	21	21	3	8	200

* = Starting Line-up

== All-American Week ==
=== Schedule ===
- Monday, March 29: Powerade Jamfest
  - Slam Dunk Contest
  - Three-Point Shoot-out
  - Timed Basketball Skills Competition
- Wednesday, March 31: 33rd Annual Boys All-American Game

The Powerade JamFest is a skills-competition evening featuring basketball players who demonstrate their skills in three crowd-entertaining ways. The slam dunk contest was first held in 1987, and a 3-point shooting challenge was added in 1989. A timed basketball skills competition was added to the schedule of events in 2009.

=== Contest Winners ===
- The 2010 Powerade Slam Dunk contest was won by Josh Selby.
- The winner of the 2010 3-point shoot-out was Cory Joseph.
- The winner of the basketball skills competition was Keith Appling.

== See also ==
2010 McDonald's All-American Girls Game
