= Harrison Barnes =

American basketball player (born 1992)

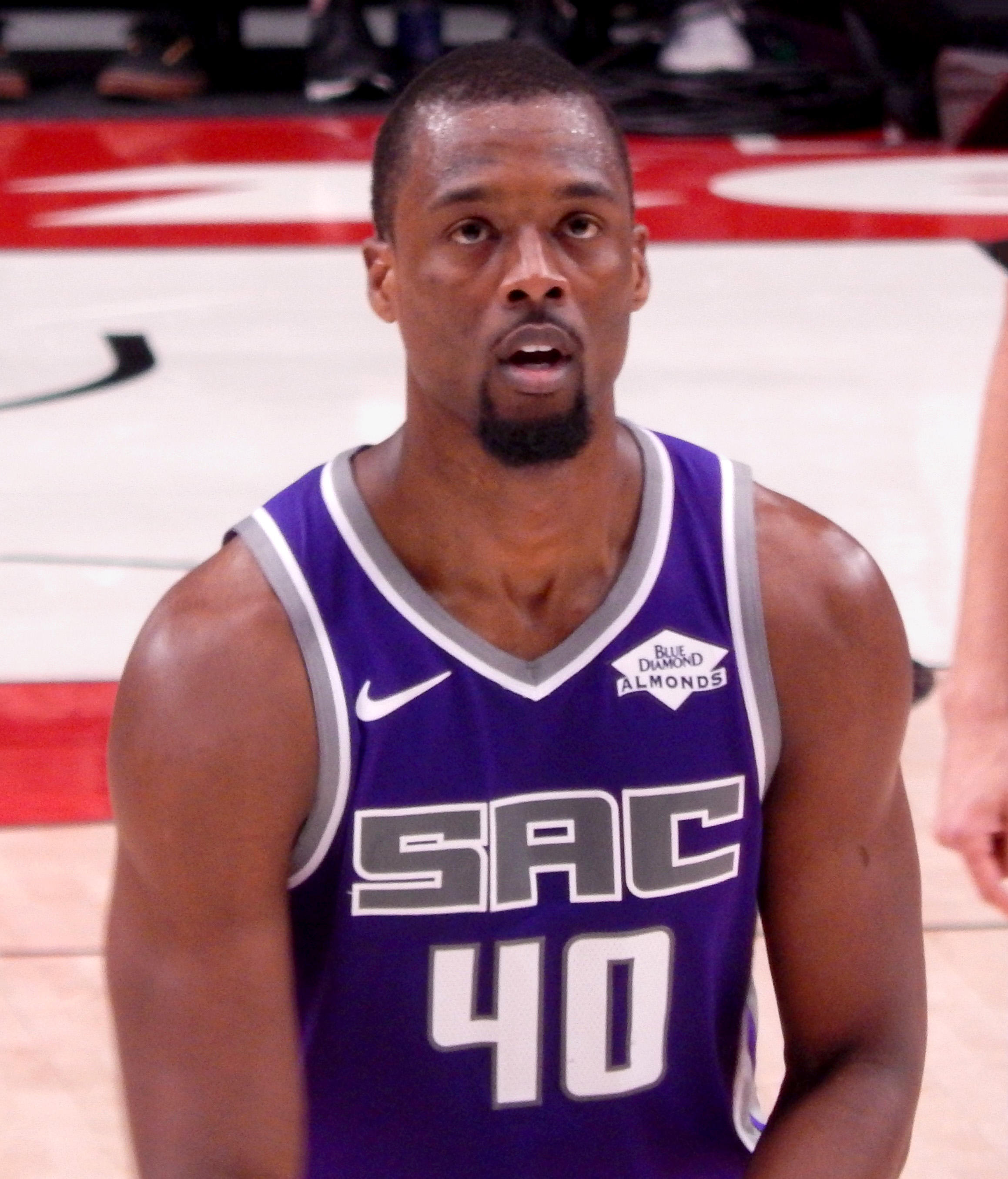
- Barnes with the Sacramento Kings in 2019

No. 40 – San Antonio Spurs
- Position: Small forward / power forward
- League: NBA

Personal information
- Born: May 30, 1992 (age 34) Ames, Iowa, U.S.
- Listed height: 6 ft 7 in (2.01 m)
- Listed weight: 225 lb (102 kg)

Career information
- High school: Ames (Ames, Iowa)
- College: North Carolina (2010–2012)
- NBA draft: 2012: 1st round, 7th overall pick
- Drafted by: Golden State Warriors
- Playing career: 2012–present

Career history
- 2012–2016: Golden State Warriors
- 2016–2019: Dallas Mavericks
- 2019–2024: Sacramento Kings
- 2024–present: San Antonio Spurs

Career highlights
- NBA champion (2015); NBA All-Rookie First Team (2013); Second-team All-American – NABC (2012); First-team All-ACC (2012); Second-team All-ACC (2011); ACC Rookie of the Year (2011); ACC All-Freshman team (2011); No. 40 honored by North Carolina Tar Heels; National high school player of the year (2010); McDonald's All-American Game Co-MVP (2010); First-team Parade All-American (2010); Second-team Parade All-American (2009); Iowa Mr. Basketball (2010)
- Stats at NBA.com
- Stats at Basketball Reference
Medals
Men's basketball
Representing the United States
Olympic Games
Gold medal – first place	2016 Rio de Janeiro	Team

Harrison Bryce Jordan Barnes (born May 30, 1992) is an American professional basketball player for the San Antonio Spurs of the National Basketball Association (NBA). He played college basketball for the North Carolina Tar Heels before being selected by the Golden State Warriors in the first round of the 2012 NBA draft with the seventh overall pick. Barnes won an NBA championship with the Warriors in 2015. He also won a gold medal as a member of the 2016 U.S. Olympic team.

== High school career ==
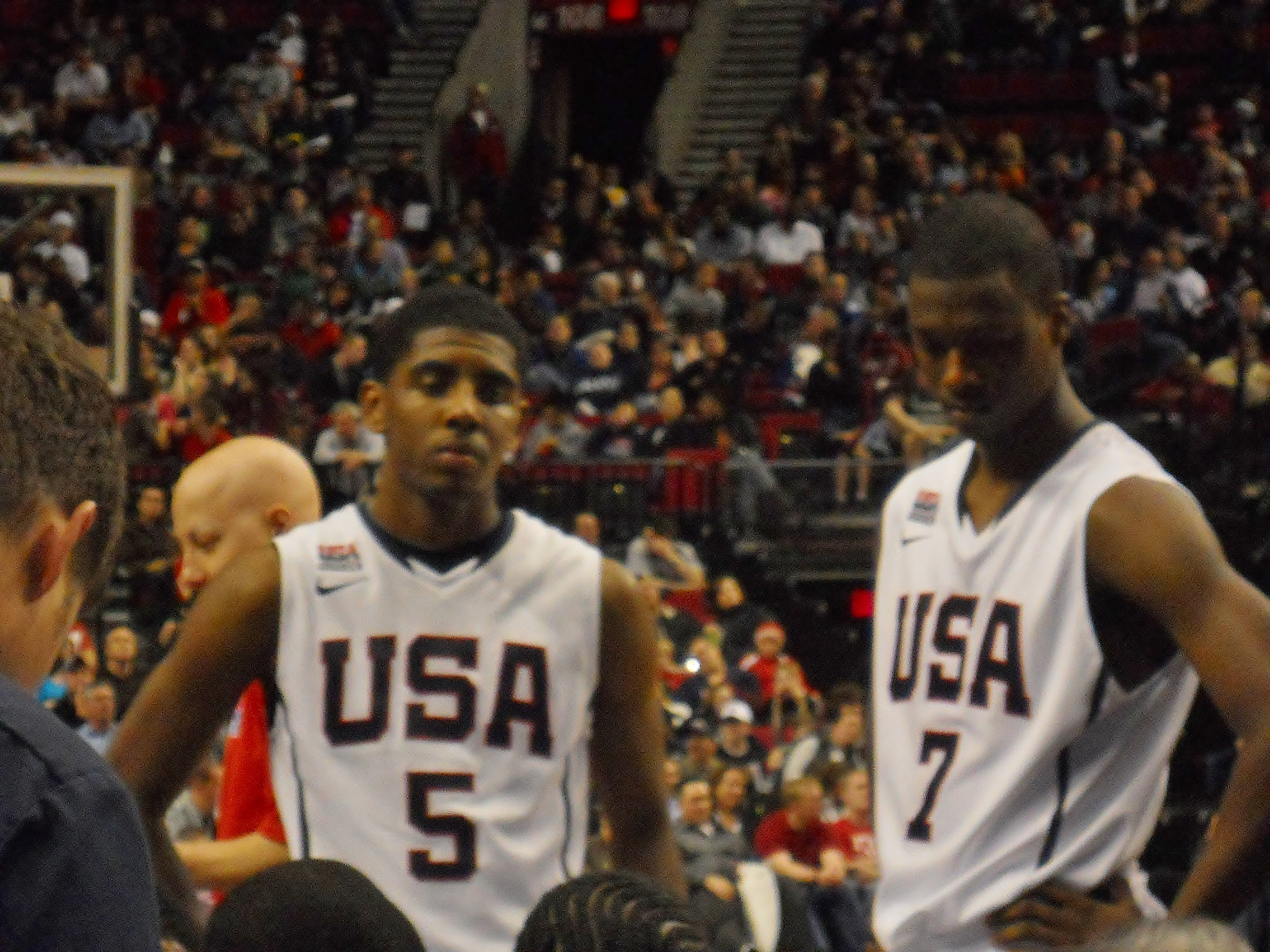
Barnes (right) with Kyrie Irving while playing for the United States

Barnes was rated as the number one player in the class of 2010 by Scout.com and in the ESPNU 100. He was rated as the number two player by Rivals.com. As a junior, Barnes and teammate Doug McDermott led Ames High School to an Iowa 4A state championship where he had 24 points and eight rebounds in the final, capping off a 26–0 season. As a senior, Barnes and McDermott led Ames to a 27–0 season and a second straight Iowa 4A state championship becoming Iowa's big-school class's first team to go undefeated in consecutive seasons. In the finals, he scored 19 points against Southeast Polk. He averaged 27.1 points, 10.4 rebounds, 4.0 steals, and 4.0 assists during his senior year and was selected to the USA Today All-USA First Team. Barnes capped off his Ames High School career as their all-time leading scorer with 1,787 points. Barnes played in the fourth annual Boost Mobile Elite 24 Hoops Classic where he scored 18 points for Skip to My Lou.

On January 20, 2010, it was announced that Barnes was selected to the 2010 Junior National Select Team. The team played at the 2010 Nike Hoop Summit at the Rose Garden in Portland, Oregon, on April 10. He was also selected to play in the 2010 McDonald's All-American Game where he led the West team to a 107–104 victory. He scored a team high 18 points and was named co-MVP with Jared Sullinger. He also played in the 2010 Jordan Brand Classic where he was named co-MVP with Kyrie Irving. On March 10, Barnes won the Morgan Wootten Player of the Year Award, which goes to the nation's top player.

Barnes completed nine advanced placement credits before graduating high school.

=== AAU ===
Barnes played for All Iowa Attack and Howard Pulley Panthers (MN) on the AAU Circuit, along with football prospect Seantrel Henderson.

=== College recruitment ===
College recruiting
Name	Hometown	School	Height	Weight	Commit date
Harrison Barnes; SF	Ames, IA	Ames HS	6 ft 7 in (2.01 m)	240 lb (110 kg)	Nov 13, 2009
Harrison Barnes; SF	Recruit ratings: Scout: Rivals: (1)				

Barnes considered offers from Duke, Iowa State, Kansas, North Carolina, Oklahoma and UCLA. He unofficially visited Kansas twice, for Late Night in the Phog in October 2008 and a spring game against Tennessee. Barnes took official visits to North Carolina, Duke, Kansas, UCLA and Oklahoma, but he did not take an official visit to Iowa State since he lived only 1 mile (1.6 km) from campus, so Barnes chose to unofficially visit instead. On November 13, 2009, he Skyped coach Roy Williams of North Carolina to announce his decision to join the Tar Heels.

== College career ==
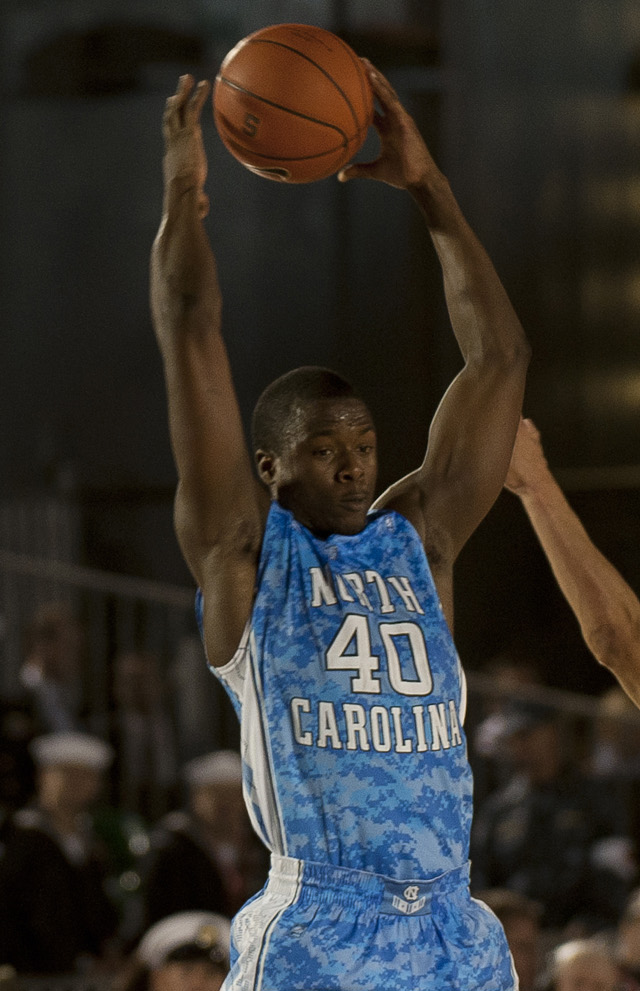
Barnes playing in the Carrier Classic game in November 2011

Barnes had 21 points in his North Carolina debut in an exhibition game in the Bahamas against the Commonwealth Bank Giants, which UNC won 130–87. Overall, Barnes averaged 22 points and 6.5 rebounds per game for UNC in the Bahamas. On November 1, 2010, Barnes was named a preseason All-American by the AP. Barnes had 14 points and 4 rebounds in his North Carolina debut versus Lipscomb. He recorded his first career double-double on December 11, scoring 19 points and snatching 10 rebounds in a 96–91 victory over Long Beach State University. Barnes developed a knack for coming up clutch in the later portion of his freshman season, like when he scored eight of his twelve points in the closing minutes to help the Tar Heels beat Virginia Tech. Barnes made the eventual game-winning three-point shot against Miami to give the Tar Heels the lead with 6.6 seconds remaining in the game. Just weeks later in the Tar Heels game at Florida State, Barnes nailed a three-point shot to give the Tar Heels the victory. Barnes set a career high of 26 points against Boston College on February 1, 2011. He surpassed this mark on March 12 in an ACC tournament game against Clemson, scoring 40 points while also grabbing eight rebounds. Additionally, Barnes's 40-point performance set the record for points by a freshman in an ACC tournament game. On April 18, Barnes announced that he would return to North Carolina for his sophomore season despite being projected as a lottery pick for the 2011 NBA draft. Barnes was seen as the potential first pick along with Jared Sullinger, Kyrie Irving and Derrick Williams.

Barnes' second season with the Tar Heels was also successful. He led the team in scoring 16 of their 38 games, helping the team to the ACC regular-season title, the final of the ACC tournament, and the Elite 8 of the NCAA tournament.

Barnes was the ninth player in school history to earn ACC Rookie of Year recognition and the fourth to do so under coach Roy Williams. Barnes scored the most points as a freshman in the ACC tournament since Phil Ford scored 78 points in 1975. In the NCAA tournament, he scored 84 points, the most points of any UNC freshman in history.

== Professional career ==
=== Golden State Warriors (2012–2016) ===
==== 2012–13 season: All-Rookie honors ====
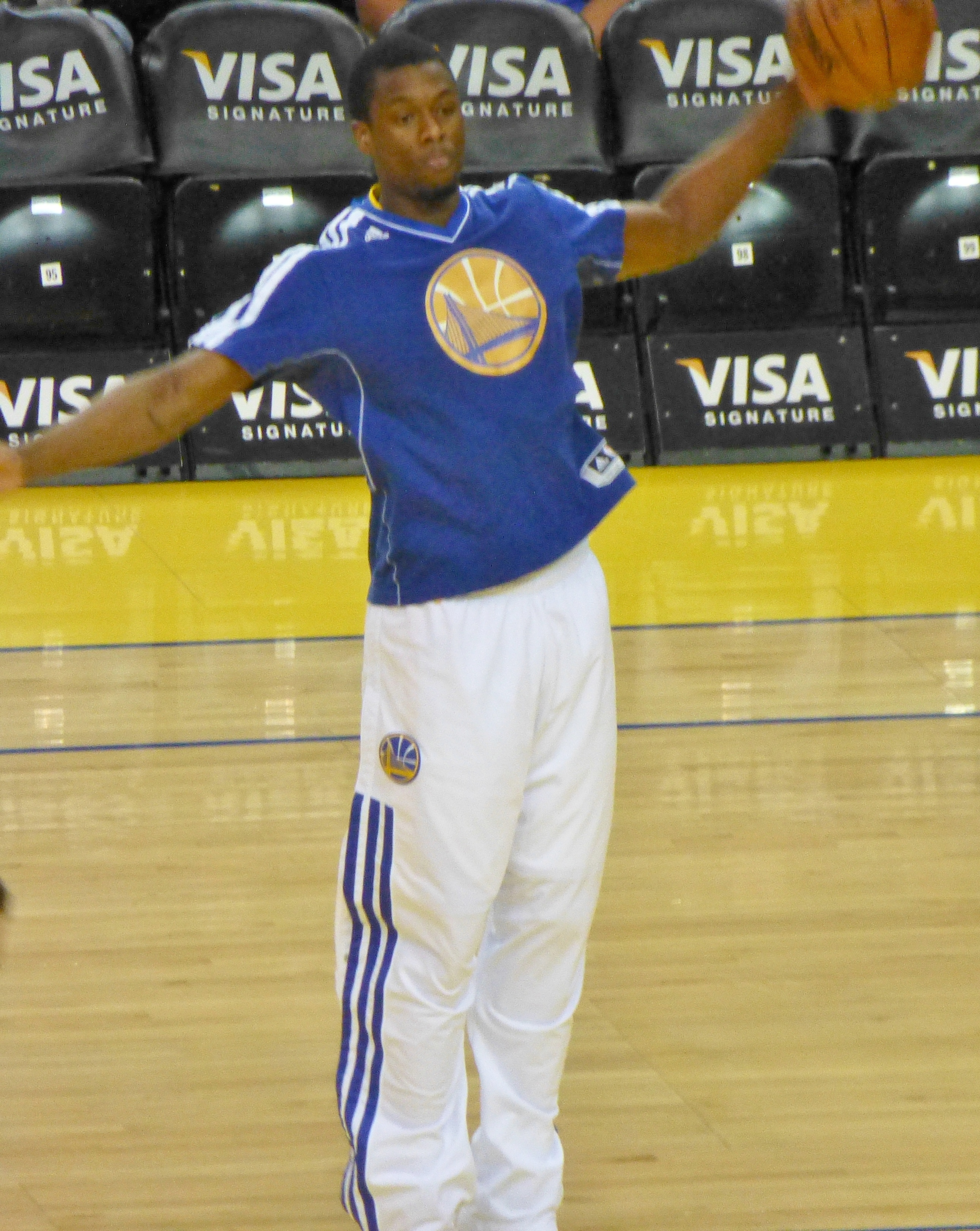
Barnes warming up as a rookie

On March 29, 2012, Barnes announced that he was entering the 2012 NBA draft along with Tyler Zeller, Kendall Marshall and John Henson. Barnes worked out with four teams: Cleveland Cavaliers, Charlotte Bobcats, Washington Wizards and Toronto Raptors. He was selected seventh overall by the Golden State Warriors.

Warriors coach Mark Jackson said that Barnes was able to defend all five positions on the floor. In Game 4 of the semifinals of the 2013 NBA Playoffs on May 12, Barnes scored 26 points and added 10 rebounds. Two days later, the NBA named him to the 2012–13 All-Rookie first team. Barnes also placed sixth in NBA Rookie of the Year voting, in a tie with Chris Copeland (eight points total).

==== 2013–14 season: Sixth man ====
With the arrival of Andre Iguodala, Barnes became a reserve player. He again participated in BBVA Compass Rising Stars Challenge. He was chosen as a starter for Team Hill. Barnes finished the game with 16 points, three rebounds, three assists, and two steals in 23 minutes in the team's win. On April 16, 2014, he scored a career-high 30 points against the Denver Nuggets in the final regular season game for the Warriors. The Warriors finished the regular season with a 51–31 record, going into the playoffs as the #6-seed in the West, but went on to lose to the Los Angeles Clippers in seven games during the first round.

==== 2014–15 season: Championship season ====
Under new head coach Steve Kerr, Barnes moved back into the starting lineup and had an immediate impact. On March 18, 2015, he scored a season-high 25 points in a 114–95 victory over the Atlanta Hawks. On April 2, he hit a running shot in the lane with less than a second remaining, lifting the Warriors to a narrow 107–106 victory over the Phoenix Suns.

In the playoffs, Barnes had a quiet breakout performance in the semifinals against the Memphis Grizzlies. He averaged 12.8 points per game, while shooting 54.4% from the field, a performance lauded by many basketball insiders due to the reputation of the Grizzlies' defense. In Games 4, 5, and 6, Barnes made several key plays in clutch situations. When the Warriors were losing by double digits in the first quarter of Game 5, Barnes got the comeback started with several key shots, which turned into a rout once teammate Stephen Curry was able to shoulder much of the load. On May 27, in the Warriors' Western Conference Finals clinching Game 5 victory, Barnes scored 24 points to help lead them to the NBA Finals for the first time in 40 years. Barnes won his first NBA championship with the Warriors after they defeated the Cleveland Cavaliers in the 2015 NBA Finals in six games.

==== 2015–16 season: NBA record for wins ====
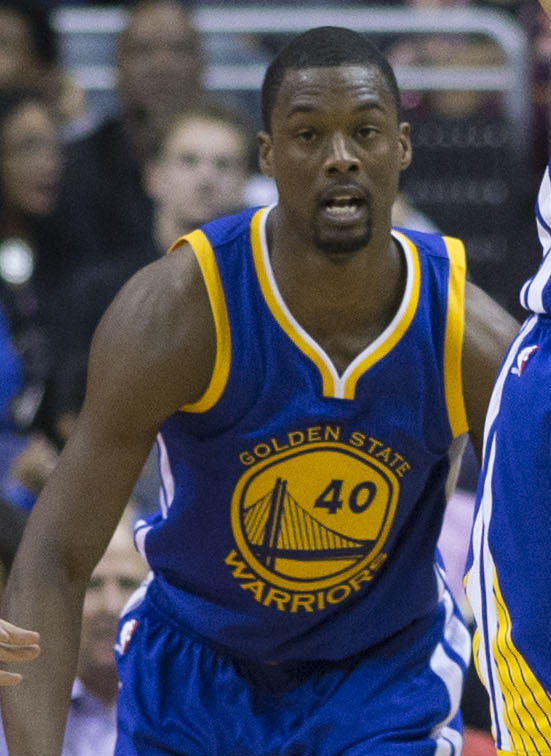
Barnes in his final season with the Warriors

Barnes helped the Warriors go 17–0 to start the season before a sprained left ankle ruled him out for 16 straight games. Barnes returned to action on January 4 against the Charlotte Hornets, scoring eight points off the bench in a 111–101 victory. On April 7, Barnes scored 21 points against the San Antonio Spurs, scoring in double figures for a ninth straight game, a career high. The win made the Warriors the second team in NBA history to win 70 games in a season. The Warriors went on to win an NBA record 73 games, eclipsing the 72–10 record set by the 1995–96 Chicago Bulls.

Through the first two rounds of the playoffs, Barnes shot just 36% from the field. In the Western Conference Finals against the Oklahoma City Thunder, he shot 48% from the field while averaging 8.7 points per game to help the Warriors defeat the Thunder in seven games after overcoming a 3–1 deficit to advance to the 2016 NBA Finals. In Game 1 of the NBA Finals against the Cleveland Cavaliers, Barnes had a 13-point performance to help the Warriors win 104–89. Despite the Warriors going up 3–1 in the series following a Game 4 win, they went on to lose the series in seven games to become the first team in NBA history to lose the championship series after being up 3–1. Barnes only shot 16% in the last three games.

=== Dallas Mavericks (2016–2019) ===
==== 2016–17 season ====
On July 9, 2016, Barnes signed a four-year, $94 million contract with the Dallas Mavericks. He made his Mavericks debut in their season opener on October 26, recording 19 points and nine rebounds in a 130–121 overtime loss to the Indiana Pacers. Two days later, Barnes scored a career-high 31 points in a 106–98 loss to the Houston Rockets. He bested that mark on November 6, scoring 34 points in an 86–75 overtime win over the Milwaukee Bucks. Barnes scored 30 points or more seven times during the 2016–17 season, including five 31-point games. After never finishing better than fourth in scoring in his four seasons with the Golden State Warriors, Barnes led the Mavericks with a career-best 19.2 points per game.

==== 2017–18 season ====
Barnes would again lead the Mavericks in scoring in 2017–2018, though the team finished 24–58 and 13th of 15 teams in the Western Conference. On November 7, 2017, Barnes scored a season-high 31 points against the Washington Wizards. He tied that mark on November 20 against the Boston Celtics. Two days later, Barnes banked a 30-footer as the horn sounded to lift the Mavericks to a 95–94 victory over the Memphis Grizzlies. Barnes led the Mavericks with 22 points, nine of them coming in the fourth quarter to help Dallas thwart a late Memphis comeback. On December 26, 2017, he tied his career high with his sixth double-double of the season after registering 16 points and 10 rebounds in a 98–93 win over the Toronto Raptors. He previously achieved it in Golden State's championship season of 2014–15. On January 10, 2018, he had 13 of his 25 points in the fourth quarter of the Mavericks' 115–111 win over the Charlotte Hornets. He made all five of his shots in the fourth quarter and added 11 rebounds. He finished the season with eight double-doubles, setting a new personal best.

==== 2018–19 season ====
Barnes missed the first four games of the 2018–19 season because of a strained right hamstring. In his season debut on October 26, he shot 5 for 17 and scored 14 points in a 116–107 loss to the Raptors. On December 2, he scored a season-high 30 points in a 114–110 win over the Los Angeles Clippers. On December 31, he scored 25 points and matched his career high with seven 3-pointers in nine attempts in a 122–102 loss to the Oklahoma City Thunder.

=== Sacramento Kings (2019–2024) ===
On February 6, 2019, while in the middle of a game for Dallas against the Charlotte Hornets, Barnes was traded to the Sacramento Kings in exchange for Zach Randolph and Justin Jackson. He made his debut for the Kings two days later, scoring 12 points in a 102–96 win over the Miami Heat. Barnes signed a four-year, $85 million contract extension with the Sacramento Kings following the 2019 season.

On October 20, 2021, Barnes scored a game-leading 36 points, including a career-high eight three-point shots, during a 124–121 win over the Portland Trail Blazers. On October 27, Barnes hit a game-winning fadeaway three pointer to secure victory for the Kings against the Phoenix Suns, 110–107.

On November 20, 2022, Barnes scored 27 points and grabbed nine rebounds during a 137–129 win over the Detroit Pistons. Barnes started all 82 games for Sacramento during the 2022–23 NBA season, recording averages of 15.0 points, 4.5 rebounds, and 1.6 assists.

On June 29, 2023, Barnes signed a three-year, $54 million extension through the 2025–26 season.

=== San Antonio Spurs (2024–present) ===
On July 8, 2024, Barnes was traded to the San Antonio Spurs in a three-team trade, which also included the Sacramento Kings and the Chicago Bulls. Barnes started all 82 games for San Antonio during the 2024–25 NBA season, averaging 12.3 points, 3.8 rebounds, and 1.7 assists.

On June 29, 2026, Barnes re-signed with the Spurs on a one-year, $8 million contract.

== Career statistics ==
Legend
GP	Games played	GS	Games started	MPG	Minutes per game
FG%	Field goal percentage	3P%	3-point field goal percentage	FT%	Free throw percentage
RPG	Rebounds per game	APG	Assists per game	SPG	Steals per game
BPG	Blocks per game	PPG	Points per game	**Bold**	Career high
†	Won an NBA championship	*	Led the league

=== NBA ===
==== Regular season ====
Year	Team	GP	GS	MPG	FG%	3P%	FT%	RPG	APG	SPG	BPG	PPG
2012–13	Golden State	81	81	25.4	.439	.359	.758	4.1	1.2	.6	.2	9.2
2013–14	Golden State	78	24	28.3	.399	.347	.718	4.0	1.5	**.8**	**.3**	9.5
2014–15†	Golden State	**82**	**82***	28.3	.482	.405	.720	5.5	1.4	.7	.2	10.1
2015–16	Golden State	66	59	30.9	.466	.383	.761	4.9	1.8	.6	.2	11.7
2016–17	Dallas	79	79	35.5	.468	.351	.**861**	5.0	1.5	**.8**	.2	**19.2**
2017–18	Dallas	77	77	34.2	.445	.357	.827	6.1	2.0	.6	.2	18.9
2018–19	Dallas	49	49	32.3	.404	.389	.833	4.2	1.3	.7	.2	17.7
2018–19	Sacramento	28	28	33.9	.455	.408	.800	5.5	1.9	.6	.1	14.3
2019–20	Sacramento	72	72	34.5	.460	.381	.801	4.9	2.2	.6	.2	14.5
2020–21	Sacramento	58	58	**36.2**	.497	.391	.830	**6.6**	**3.5**	.7	.2	16.1
2021–22	Sacramento	77	77	33.6	.469	.394	.826	5.6	2.4	.7	.2	16.4
2022–23	Sacramento	**82**	**82**	32.5	.473	.374	.847	4.5	1.6	.7	.1	15.0
2023–24	Sacramento	**82**	**82***	29.0	.474	.387	.801	3.0	1.2	.7	.1	12.2
2024–25	San Antonio	**82***	**82***	27.2	**.508**	**.433**	.809	3.8	1.7	.5	.2	12.3
2025–26	San Antonio	77	52	25.8	.456	.388	.829	2.8	1.9	.6	.2	9.9
Career		1070	984	30.9	.460	.385	.811	4.6	1.8	.7	.2	13.6

==== Playoffs ====
Year	Team	GP	GS	MPG	FG%	3P%	FT%	RPG	APG	SPG	BPG	PPG
2013	Golden State	12	12	**38.4**	**.444**	.365	**.857**	**6.4**	1.3	.6	.4	**16.1**
2014	Golden State	7	0	22.3	.396	**.381**	.563	4.0	1.1	.1	.4	7.9
2015†	Golden State	21*	21*	32.4	.440	.355	.735	5.2	**1.5**	.8	**.5**	10.6
2016	Golden State	**24**	**23**	31.0	.385	.342	.765	4.7	1.3	.7	.2	9.0
2023	Sacramento	7	7	28.0	.417	.240	.731	3.4	.7	**1.1**	.3	10.7
2026	San Antonio	20	0	9.2	.333	.231	.824	1.3	.3	.1	.1	2.3
Career		91	63	26.6	.414	.332	.759	4.1	1.0	.6	.3	8.9

=== College ===
Year	Team	GP	GS	MPG	FG%	3P%	FT%	RPG	APG	SPG	BPG	PPG
2010–11	North Carolina	37	36	**29.4**	.423	.344	**.750**	**5.8**	**1.4**	.7	**.4**	15.7
2011–12	North Carolina	**38**	**37**	29.2	**.440**	**.358**	.723	5.2	1.1	**1.1**	.3	**17.1**
Career		75	73	29.3	.431	.349	.734	5.5	1.3	.9	.4	16.4

== National team career ==
In June 2016, Barnes was named in the United States national team for the 2016 Summer Olympics. He helped Team USA win the gold medal in Rio, and in four games, Barnes averaged 4.3 points and 2.1 rebounds per game.

In August 2019, Barnes was named as part of the United States national team for the 2019 FIBA World Cup. He helped team USA to a 6–2 record and a seventh-place finish in the tournament, losing in the quarterfinal round to France and in the fifth-place game to Serbia before rallying to win the seventh-place game against Poland. Barnes averaged 11.6 points and 4.6 rebounds per game.

== Awards and honors ==
=== High school ===
- 2010 Morgan Wootten Player of the Year Award winner
- 2010 McDonald's All-American team selection
- 2010 Jordan Brand High School All-American team selection
- 2010 First-team Parade All-American
- 2010 Iowa Mr. Basketball
- 2009 Sporting News High School Athlete of the Year
- 2009 Second-team Parade All-American

=== College ===
- 2010, 2011 Preseason All-American
- 2011 Second Team All-ACC
- 2011 All-ACC Freshman Team
- 2011 ACC Rookie of the Year
- 2012 Second Team All-American (NABC)
- 2012 First Team All-ACC

=== Professional ===
- 2015 NBA champion
- 2013 NBA All-Rookie First Team
- NBA Community Assist Award: (2019–20)

== Personal life ==
Barnes is a Christian. He is also a teetotaler; he had his first sip of alcohol after winning the 2015 NBA Finals. On July 29, 2017, he married Brittany Johnson at Rosecliff in Newport, Rhode Island.

On September 15, 2022, Barnes' high school alma mater honored him for his career and community support by naming the gymnasium and basketball court at the new high school after him and electing him to the school's Hall of Fame.
