= Deshaun Thomas =

American basketball player (born 1991)

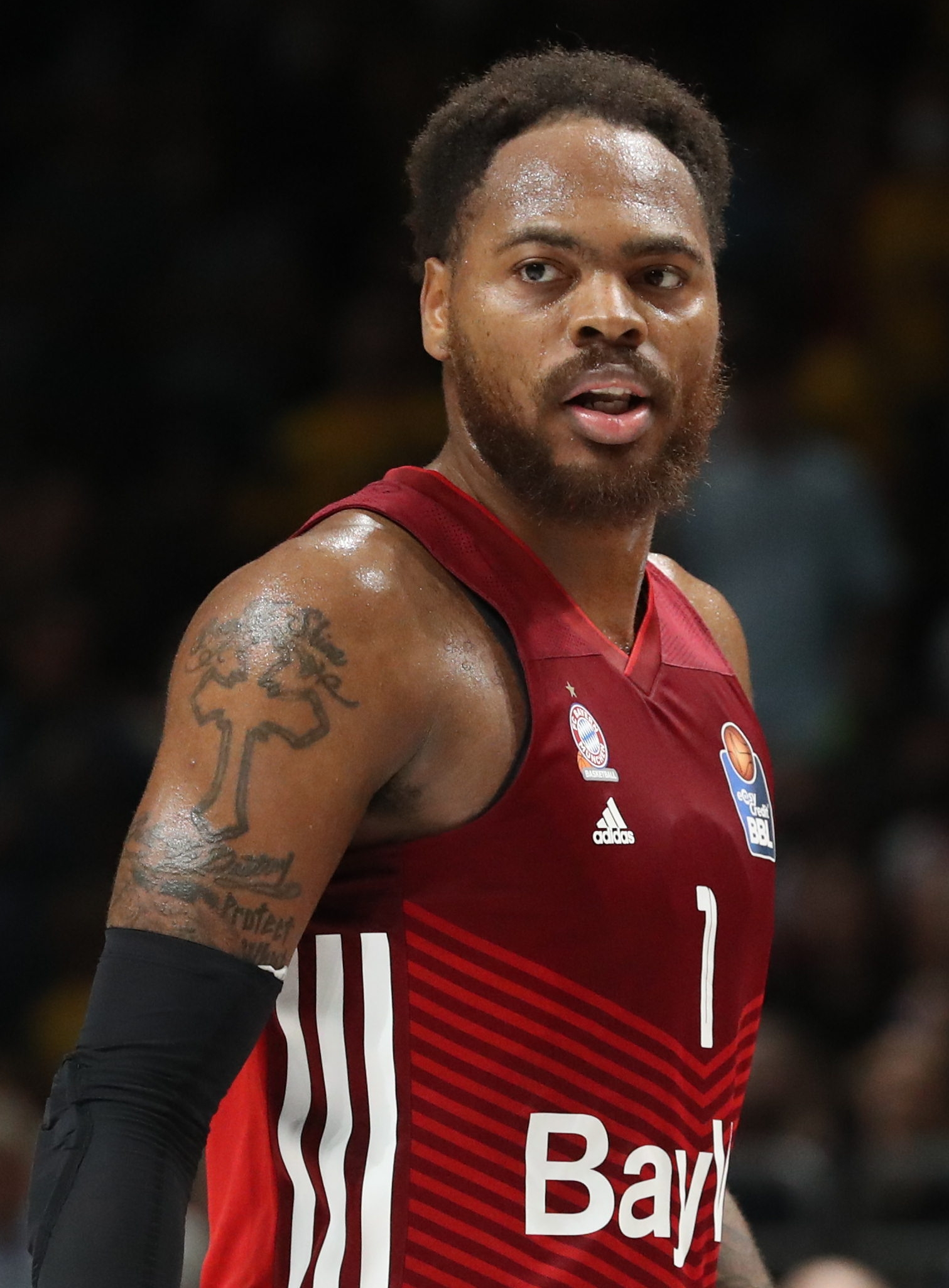
- Thomas with Bayern Munich in 2022

Personal information
- Born: August 29, 1991 (age 35) Fort Wayne, Indiana, U.S.
- Listed height: 6 ft 7 in (2.01 m)
- Listed weight: 229 lb (104 kg)

Career information
- High school: Bishop Luers (Fort Wayne, Indiana)
- College: Ohio State (2010–2013)
- NBA draft: 2013: 2nd round, 58th overall pick
- Drafted by: San Antonio Spurs
- Playing career: 2013–2024
- Position: Power forward / small forward
- Number: 23, 4, 1, 0

Career history
- 2013–2014: JSF Nanterre
- 2014–2015: FC Barcelona
- 2015–2016: Austin Spurs
- 2016–2017: Anadolu Efes
- 2017–2018: Maccabi Tel Aviv
- 2018–2020: Panathinaikos
- 2020–2021: Alvark Tokyo
- 2021–2022: Bayern Munich
- 2022–2023: Olimpia Milano
- 2023–2024: Joventut Badalona
- 2024: ASVEL

Career highlights
- 2× Greek League champion (2019, 2020); Greek Basketball Cup winner (2019); Israeli Premier League champion (2018); Israeli League Cup winner (2017); French Cup winner (2014); Greek League Finals MVP (2019); All-Bundesliga First Team (2022); Second-team All-American – SN (2013); Third-team All-American – AP, NABC (2013); First-team All-Big Ten (2013); Second-team All-Big Ten (Coaches) (2012); Third-team All-Big Ten (Media) (2012); McDonald's All-American (2010); First-team Parade All-American (2010); Fourth-team Parade All-American (2009); Indiana Mr. Basketball (2010)
- Stats at Basketball Reference

Deshaun Leroy Thomas (born August 29, 1991) is an American former professional basketball player who played eleven professional seasons. Standing at 6 ft 7 in (2.01 m), he played the small forward and power forward positions. Thomas played college basketball for the Ohio State Buckeyes and was selected 58th overall in the 2013 NBA draft by the San Antonio Spurs.

== Early life ==
Even as a young man, the basketball prospects of Thomas were apparent to those who knew him. As a 5th-grade student at Northcrest Elementary School in Fort Wayne, Indiana, Thomas's height had already surpassed that of many of his teachers. As a middle-schooler at Northwood Middle School, Thomas led the school's basketball team to back-to-back Fort Wayne middle school championships.

== High school career ==
Thomas attended Bishop Luers High School in Fort Wayne, where he was ranked as one of the top basketball players in the nation for the class of 2010. As a sophomore and then again as a junior, he led the Bishop Luers Knights to back-to-back Class 2A Indiana state championships. His 34 points and 15 rebounds in 2009 each stand as the second best ever in the class 2A state championship game.

Prior to Thomas, the Knights had never won a Summit Athletic Conference Holiday Basketball Tournament, and their overall history in the tournament still stands as the worst record of all time. However, in 2007–2009, Thomas led the Knights to back-to-back-to-back three-peat tournament titles as a sophomore, junior and senior.

Thomas was a prolific scorer throughout his high school career. Thomas finished his career ranked 3rd best all-time among all Indiana high school boys' basketball players and 4th best all-time when considering both boys and girls.

As a freshman, Thomas orally committed to play for coach Thad Matta at the Ohio State University. For the season, Thomas averaged 28.95 points per game, finishing second in the state behind the 28.96 average of former Indiana Hoosier Eric Gordon.

As a senior, Thomas and his Luers teammates traveled to Columbus, Ohio to participate in the 2010 Ohio Scholastic Play-by-Play Classic, a seven-game showcase featuring high school teams of players recruited by Ohio State and other Division I universities. Luers draw in the program was the feature game of the year's classic, against the nation's #1-rated high school team, Columbus Northland High School, coincidentally from the Buckeyes' home town. Northland featured two Buckeye recruits – Jared Sullinger, the previous year's Ohio Mr. Basketball and the #1 high school recruit in the nation; and J.D. Weatherspoon. A fourth OSU recruit, Jordan Sibert, also played in the classic. This four-man coupe are key reasons the Buckeyes had what some say was the #1 recruiting class for 2010. Although Northland won the game 88–67, Thomas led all scorers with 36 points. Sullinger contributed 24 points to Northland's total, and Weatherspoon added 8 points with output stunted due to foul trouble.

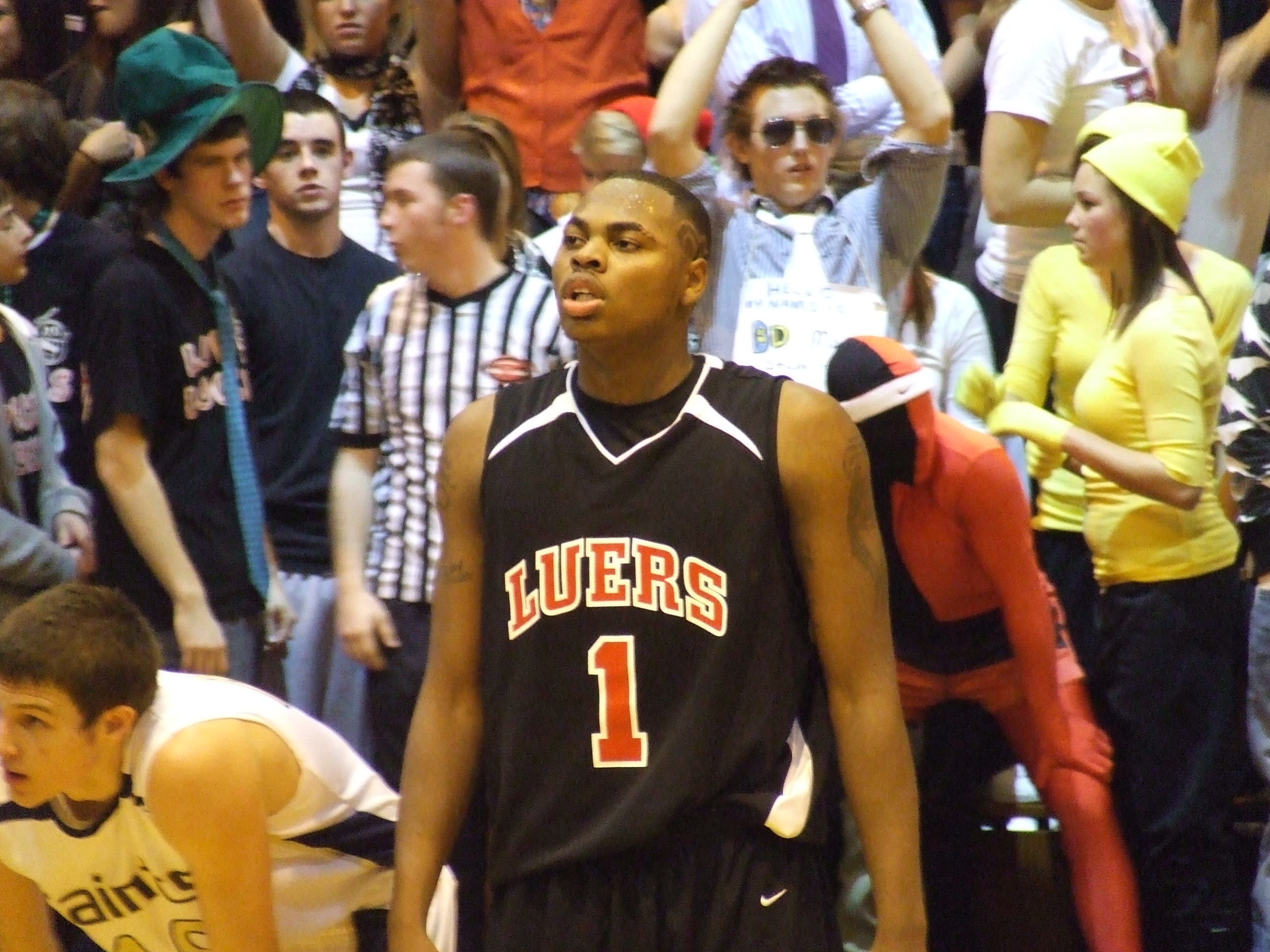
Thomas with Bishop Luers HS in January 2010

On February 11, 2010, Thomas played his last home basketball game for Bishop Luers. At that Senior Night game, it was announced to the fans that Thomas had been selected to the roster of the 2010 McDonald's All-American Boys Game. The game was played March 31, 2010 at the Jerome Schottenstein Center, home court of the Ohio State Buckeyes. Joining Thomas on the game's roster were Sullinger and Ray McCallum, Jr., a star guard from Detroit Country Day. Bishop Luers had played the McCallum-led Country Day earlier in Thomas' senior season.

On February 18, 2010, Thomas was named as a participant in Nike's 2010 Jordan Brand Classic, played April 17, 2010 at Madison Square Garden in New York City.

On February 24, 2010, it was announced that Thomas was one of six finalists being considered for the 2010 Naismith Award, a prestigious honor given annually by the Atlanta Tipoff Club to the high school boys' basketball player of the year. The 2010 recipient was future teammate Jared Sullinger.

On March 13, 2010, Thomas and the Bishop Luers Knights lost 70–68 in a stunning upset to the Southwood Knights in the regional tournament opening round. Thomas ended his high school career with 3,018 points, just the third player in Indiana boys' basketball to reach the 3,000 point level. The total fell just one point short of tying second place holder Marion Pierce.

On March 25, 2010, it was announced that Thomas was one of 26 players named to the Associated Press's Indiana All-Century team, a special team selected in honor of the 100th anniversary of the Indiana high school basketball tournament.

On March 29, 2010, it was announced that Thomas was selected as a first-team member of the 2010 Parade All-America Team.

The culmination of Thomas's career came April 3, 2010 when he was named recipient of the 2010 Indiana Mr. Basketball award.

On April 9, 2010, the Associated Press announced that Thomas had been named to their 1st-team Indiana high school All-State team. Thomas was the leading vote-getter among all honorees. The award marked the fourth time in his high school career that Thomas had been named a member of the team and the third straight time he was a 1st-team selection. Days later, Thomas was named as the first three-time winner of the Tiffany Gooden award, given annually to the best basketball player in the Summit Athletic Conference.

On May 21, 2010, in a ceremony at Bishop Luers, Thomas' #1 jersey was retired by the school. This was the first time in school history a jersey of any of its athletes had been retired.

On June 11–12, 2010, Thomas led the Indiana All-stars in a pair of games against cross-border rivals from Kentucky. Thomas played a significant role in the Indiana sweep of the two-game series. He scored 18 points and added 13 rebounds as Indiana won the first game in Kentucky, and he scored a game-high 28 points and picked up 12 rebounds in the following night's victory in Indianapolis.

=== High school statistics ===
Year	Team	GP	GS	MPG	FG%	3P%	FT%	RPG	APG	SPG	BPG	PPG
2006–07	Bishop Luers HS	23			.500	.260	.730	13.3	2.5	1.4	1.4	29.0
2007–08	Bishop Luers HS	27			.500	.390	.740	12.1	2.4	1.8	2.4	28.6
2008–09	Bishop Luers HS	27			.480	.310	.760	15.1	2.7	1.6	2.5	30.3
2009–10	Bishop Luers HS	24			.500	.320	.820	15.3	3.0	1.3	2.7	31.8
Career		101			.496	.324	.767	13.9	2.7	1.5	2.3	29.9

== College career ==
Thomas graduated from high school as a highly regarded five-star player who verbally committed to play for the Ohio State Buckeyes when he was still a high school freshman. As a senior on November 11, 2009, Thomas formalized his decision by signing a letter of intent with the Buckeyes.

=== College highlights ===
- 2010–11 – Freshman
  - In his first collegiate game, Thomas came off the bench to score 24 points and grab 8 rebounds against North Carolina A&T. Thomas also made 2-for-3 from three-point range.
  - November 29, 2010 – Named Big 10 Freshman of the Week
  - On January 22, 2011, Thomas played a key role to enable a second-half come-from-behind road victory against Illinois. He sank three straight shots, including two 3-pointers, to allow the #1-ranked Buckeyes to remain unbeaten with their 20th win of the season.
  - On February 27, 2011, Thomas led all scorers with 22 points in a late-season victory over Indiana, including all 14 of his team's points in one 14–3 first half spurt.
  - For the season's 37 games, Thomas averaged 7.5 pts/game (5th best on the team) while playing an average of 14.0 minutes/game (7th best). He was fourth on the team with an average of 3.5 rebounds/game. Thomas did not start in any game, but he was consistently the first forward off the bench. Thomas' contributions helped the Buckeyes to a 34–3 record, including 16–2 to win the Big 10 regular season championship. In addition, his play helped the Buckeyes win the Big 10 Post-season Tournament and get named as the #1-ranking in the overall field of 68 teams playing in the NCAA post-season tournament. With their 24–0 run to start the season, the Buckeyes were ranked 1st in the nation by most major polls for a significant part of the season.
- 2011–12 – Sophomore
  - Since the team lost three key players from the prior year, Thomas has assumed a bigger role in this year's team strategy. Through the team's first 12 games, Thomas has started each game and averaged 28.8 minutes of playing time.
  - On December 19, 2011, Thomas was named Big 10 Men's Basketball Player of the Week after two solid games. Responding to the absence of injured team leader Jared Sullinger, Thomas scored 23 points and 30 points in the two games played that week. Each game resulted in a victory, at home against South Carolina Upstate and on the road against South Carolina.
  - On February 18, 2012, Thomas recorded his first career double-double, leading the Buckeyes with 25 points and 13 rebounds in a Big Ten road loss at Michigan.
  - On May 3, 2012, at the conclusion of the regular season in which Thomas started in all 31 of the Buckeye games, Deshaun was honored by being named to the Coaches' 2nd Team All Big-10. He was also selected to the 3rd Team in a vote by the media.
  - On March 15, 2012, Thomas had one of the best games of his career. In the 2nd round of the NCAA Tournament, Deshaun led the Buckeyes to a 78–59 victory over Loyola (MD). In that game, Thomas was the leading scorer with a career-high 31 points, and he also led the game with 12 rebounds.
- 2012–13 – Junior
  - Early in the season, Thomas led the Buckeyes to the title in the 2012 Naismith Memorial Basketball Hall of Fame Tipoff championship. For his efforts, Thomas was named tournament MVP.
  - On April 5, 2013, Thomas announced that he would be foregoing his senior season at Ohio State to enter the 2013 NBA Draft. He left the school as the 9th best scorer in school history after a junior season that posted the 3rd highest single-season total ever by a Buckeye.

== Professional career ==
=== JSF Nanterre (2013–2014) ===
Thomas was selected with the 58th overall pick in the 2013 NBA draft by the San Antonio Spurs. He joined the Spurs for the 2013 NBA Summer League where he averaged 12.4 points, 5.0 rebounds and 1.2 assists in five games. On August 16, 2013, he signed with JSF Nanterre of France for the 2013–14 season. In 30 league games for Nanterre, he averaged 12.2 points, 3.9 rebounds and 1.1 assists per game.

=== FC Barcelona (2014–2015) ===
In July 2014, Thomas re-joined the Spurs for the 2014 NBA Summer League where he averaged 10.8 points and 3.2 rebounds in six games. On August 31, 2014, he signed a one-year deal with FC Barcelona of the Liga ACB. In 43 league games, he averaged 8.4 points and 2.8 rebounds per game.

=== Austin Spurs (2015–2016) ===
On September 28, 2015, Thomas signed with the Spurs. However, he was later waived by the Spurs on October 21 after appearing in two preseason games. Nine days later, he was acquired by the Austin Spurs of the NBA Development League as an affiliate player of San Antonio.

=== Anadolu Efes (2016–2017) ===
On June 29, 2016, Thomas joined the Charlotte Hornets for the 2016 NBA Summer League.

On July 14, 2016, Thomas signed a 1+1 deal with Turkish club Anadolu Efes. On June 28, 2017, Efes officially opted out of their deal with Thomas, and the player became a free agent.

=== Maccabi Tel Aviv (2017–2018) ===
On July 17, 2017, Thomas signed a 1+1 deal with the Israeli team Maccabi Tel Aviv of the EuroLeague. On October 26, 2017, Thomas recorded a career-high 28 points, shooting 11-of-16 from the field, along with 5 rebounds and 2 assists in an 84–87 loss to Crvena zvezda.

In 58 games played for Maccabi (played in the EuroLeague and the Israeli League), he averaged 11.5 points, 3.5 rebounds, and 1.0 assists, while shooting 41 percent from 3-point range. Thomas won the 2017 Israeli League Cup and the 2018 Israeli League Championship with Maccabi.

=== Panathinaikos (2018–2020) ===
On July 30, 2018, Thomas signed a one-year deal with Greek club Panathinaikos of the EuroLeague, joining his former head coach Xavi Pascual. On February 17, 2019, Thomas won the Greek Basketball Cup title by helping Panathinaikos BC win PAOK BC (79–73) in the Big Final, held in Heraklion Indoor Sports Arena, Crete. Deshaun had 12 points and 10 rebounds (double-double). Deshaun won the Greek Championship too, after Panathinaikos beaten Promitheas, undefeated in best-of-five series. He averaged 13.3 points, 4.7 rebounds and 1.3 assists in 23.2 minutes in the domestic league.

On July 2, 2019, Thomas extended his contract with Panathinaikos for two more years. During the shortened 2019–2020 campaign, in 28 EuroLeague games, Thomas averaged 13.9 points, 4.4 rebounds, 1 assist and 1 steal, playing around 30 minutes per contest.

On June 29, 2020, Thomas parted ways with the Greek powerhouse, the only club in his career so far where he stayed for more than one season.

=== Alvark Tokyo (2020–2021) ===
On August 1, 2020, the Alvark Tokyo announced that they had reached agreement with Thomas in joining them.

=== Bayern Munich (2021–2022) ===
On August 10, 2021, Thomas signed with Bayern Munich of the Basketball Bundesliga (BBL). In 36 EuroLeague games, he averaged 9.6 points and 3.2 rebounds, playing around 23 minutes per contest.

=== Olimpia Milano (2022–2023) ===
On July 27, 2022, Thomas signed with Italian powerhouse Olimpia Milano. In 22 EuroLeague games, he averaged 4.1 points and 1.4 rebounds, playing around 10 minutes per contest. On July 4, 2023, he was officially released from the Milan club.

=== Joventut Badalona (2023–2024) ===
On July 19, 2023, Thomas signed with Joventut Badalona.

=== ASVEL Basket (2024) ===
On January 7, 2024, Thomas signed with French powerhouse ASVEL Basket.

== Career statistics ==
Legend
GP	Games played	GS	Games started	MPG	Minutes per game
FG%	Field-goal percentage	3P%	3-point field-goal percentage	FT%	Free-throw percentage
RPG	Rebounds per game	APG	Assists per game	SPG	Steals per game
BPG	Blocks per game	PPG	Points per game	PIR	Performance index rating
**Bold**	Career high

=== EuroLeague ===
*	Led the league

Year	Team	GP	GS	MPG	FG%	3P%	FT%	RPG	APG	SPG	BPG	PPG	PIR
2013–14	JSF Nanterre	10	0	18.8	.429	.341	.750	2.8	.1	.4	.2	9.5	5.9
2014–15	Barcelona	28	**26**	19.4	**.526**	.395	.639	2.5	.5	.4	**.3**	7.1	7.1
2016–17	Anadolu Efes	35	0	14.3	.407	.328	.806	1.7	.3	.2	.1	7.3	4.8
2017–18	Maccabi Tel Aviv	28	5	24.3	.446	**.425**	.689	3.3	1.2	.5	.1	11.5	9.6
2018–19	Panathinaikos	32	21	22.4	.487	.355	.689	3.8	.6	.6	.1	10.5	10.0
2019–20	Panathinaikos	28*	22	**29.9**	.493	.359	.780	**4.4**	1.0	**1.0**	.2	**13.9**	**13.6**
2021–22	Bayern Munich	**36**	14	22.8	.465	.400	.702	3.2	.8	.3	.2	9.6	7.9
2022–23	Olimpia Milano	22	6	9.8	.429	.367	**.813**	1.4	.1	.0	.1	4.1	3.2
2023–24	ASVEL	10	8	23.2	.479	.217	.750	3.8	**1.5**	.2	.1	8.5	9.2
Career		229	102	20.7	.465	.364	.729	3.0	.7	.4	.1	9.2	8.1

=== EuroCup ===
Year	Team	GP	GS	MPG	FG%	3P%	FT%	RPG	APG	SPG	BPG	PPG	PIR
2013–14	JSF Nanterre	8	0	22.4	**.554**	**.379**	.708	**3.6**	**.9**	**1.0**	—	**13.8**	**12.8**
2023–24	Joventut Badalona	**11**	**7**	**26.3**	.409	.250	**.724**	3.0	.8	.2	**.2**	13.4	10.0
Career		19	7	24.6	.460	.294	.717	3.3	.8	.5	.1	13.5	11.2

=== Domestic leagues ===
Year	Team	League	GP	MPG	FG%	3P%	FT%	RPG	APG	SPG	BPG	PPG
2013–14	(France) JSF Nanterre	Pro A	30	22.0	.435	.376	.787	3.9	1.1	.2	.0	12.2
2014–15	(Spain) Barcelona	ACB	43	20.9	.513	.352	.717	2.8	.7	.7	.1	8.4
2015–16	(United States) Austin Spurs	D-League	47	28.9	.518	.293	.785	6.2	2.2	.6	.4	14.7
2016–17	(Turkey) Anadolu Efes	TBSL	30	20.6	.436	.400	.767	3.2	.9	.5	.1	10.5
2017–18	(Israel) Maccabi Tel Aviv	Ligat HaAl	30	20.3	.484	.404	.603	3.8	1.0	.4	.1	11.7
2018–19	(Greece) Panathinaikos	HEBA A1	28	23.6	.582	.333	.781	4.7	1.3	.8	.2	13.3
2019–20	(Greece) Panathinaikos	HEBA A1	20	19.3	.572	.542	.823	4.1	1.3	.6	—	12.5
2020–21	(Japan) Alvark Tokyo	B.League	44	24.4	.478	.403	.789	4.6	1.7	.4	.2	16.4
2021–22	(Germany) Bayern Munich	BBL	40	24.3	.526	.407	.735	3.4	1.1	.5	.2	14.7
2023–24	(Spain) Joventut Badalona	ACB	11	24.8	.474	.364	.745	3.3	.9	.9	.4	15.0
2023–24	(France) ASVEL	LNB Élite	19	16.5	.402	.220	.765	2.7	.8	.3	.2	5.7

=== College ===
Year	Team	GP	GS	MPG	FG%	3P%	FT%	RPG	APG	SPG	BPG	PPG
2010–11	Ohio State	37	1	14.0	.479	.328	.797	3.5	.5	.4	.2	7.5
2011–12	Ohio State	39	39	31.4	.520	.345	.755	5.4	.9	.4	.2	15.9
2012–13	Ohio State	37	37	35.4	.444	.344	.834	5.9	1.3	.5	.3	19.8
Career		113	77	27.0	.478	.342	.802	5.0	.9	.4	.2	14.4

== Awards and accomplishments ==
=== High school ===
- Career and team accomplishments
  - 3rd best all-time leading scorer, Indiana boys' basketball
  - member, AP Indiana All-Century team
  - Indiana boys' basketball state champions – Class 2A – 2009, 2008
    - 2nd best all-time, scoring (34 pts) and rebounds (15 reb), state championship game – Class 2A – 2009
  - Indiana boys' basketball sectional champions – Class 2A – 2010
  - SAC Holiday Basketball Tournament champions – 2009, 2008, 2007
- 2009/10 – Senior
  - Season stats
  - 2010 Indiana Mr. Basketball
  - 2010 finalist, Naismith Award – honoring the nation's high school basketball player of the year
  - 2010 McDonald's All-American
  - 2010 Jordan Brand Classic All-American
  - 1st team, Parade All-American
  - 1st team, leading vote-getter, AP Indiana All-State
  - 3rd team, USA Today All-USA high school basketball team
  - Indiana's NewsCenter Boys' Basketball Player of the Year
  - News-Sentinel PrepSports Boys' Basketball Player of the Year
  - Tiffany Gooden award recipient
  - led state in scoring average (31.8 ppg)
  - 2nd in state in rebounds (15.3 rpg)
  - became all-time leading scorer, Allen County, Indiana
- 2008/09 – Junior
  - Season stats
  - 4th team, Parade All-American
  - 1st team, AP Indiana All-State
  - Indiana's NewsCenter Boys' Basketball Player of the Year
  - News-Sentinel PrepSports Boys' Basketball Player of the Year
  - Tiffany Gooden award recipient
  - led state in scoring average (31.7 ppg)
  - 2nd in state in rebounds (15.7 rpg)
  - 14th in state in blocked shots (2.6 bpg)
  - became boys' all-time leading scorer, northeast Indiana
  - became boys' all-time leading scorer, Allen County, Indiana
  - became all-time leading scorer, SAC
  - became all-time leading scorer, Bishop Luers High School
- 2007/08 – Sophomore
  - Season stats
  - 1st team, AP Indiana All-State
  - Indiana's NewsCenter Boys' Basketball Player of the Year
  - News-Sentinel PrepSports Boys' Basketball Player of the Year
  - Tiffany Gooden award recipient
  - became boys' all-time leading scorer, Bishop Luers High School
  - Basketball FortWayne Player of the Year
- 2006/07 – Freshman
  - Season stats
  - 3rd team, AP Indiana All-State
  - 2nd in state in scoring average (28.95 ppg)
  - 3rd in state in rebounds (13.3 rpg)
  - Basketball FortWayne Co-Player of the Year

=== College ===
- 2012/13 – Junior
  - 3rd team, AP All-American Team
  - Preseason Top 50 & Finalist, the Wooden Award
  - 1st team, All-Big Ten (Coaches' Poll)
  - 1st team, All-Big Ten (Media Voting Panel)
  - led Big 10 in scoring average
  - led Big 10 in free throw shooting percentage
  - Two-time Big Ten Player/co-Player of the Week – January 14, November 19
  - AP Preseason All-American Team
  - ESPN Preseason All-American Team
  - Sporting News Preseason All-American Team
  - Preseason All-Big Ten Team
- 2011/12 – Sophomore
  - 2nd team, All-Big Ten (Coaches' Poll)
  - 3rd team, All-Big Ten (Media Voting Panel)
  - NCAA Tournament All-East Region Team
  - Big Ten Player of the Week – December 19
- 2010/11 – Freshman
  - Big Ten Freshman of the Week – November 29
