= Dean R. Appling =

American biochemist

Dean R. Appling is an American biochemist and associate dean, Lester J. Reed Professor at University of Texas at Austin and a published author. More information on Dean Appling's lab, focused on folic acid research and affectionately called the Folic Acid Research Team ("FART"), can be found at https://sites.cns.utexas.edu/applinglab/home.
