= Keith Appling =

American basketball player and convicted murderer (born 1992)

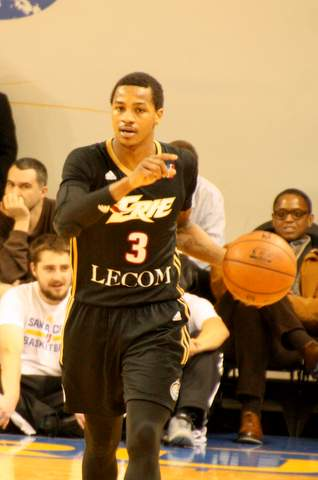
- Appling with the Erie BayHawks in 2016

Personal information
- Born: February 13, 1992 (age 34) Detroit, Michigan, U.S.
- Listed height: 6 ft 1 in (1.85 m)
- Listed weight: 190 lb (86 kg)

Career information
- High school: Pershing (Detroit, Michigan)
- College: Michigan State (2010–2014)
- NBA draft: 2014: undrafted
- Playing career: 2014–2019
- Position: Point guard

Career history
- 2014–2015: Los Angeles D-Fenders
- 2015–2016: Erie BayHawks
- 2016: Orlando Magic
- 2018: Cañeros del Este
- 2018–2019: Abejas de León
- 2019: Pallacanestro Piacentina

Career highlights
- NBA D-League All-Defensive Team (2016); NBA D-League All-Star (2016); Second-team All-Big Ten (2013); Third-team All-Big Ten (2012); McDonald's All-American (2010); Third-team Parade All-American (2010); Mr. Basketball of Michigan (2010)
- Stats at NBA.com
- Stats at Basketball Reference

Keith Damon Appling (born February 13, 1992) is an American former basketball player and convicted murderer. After going undrafted in the 2014 NBA draft, Appling appeared sporadically for the Orlando Magic before being waived in 2016. He played college basketball for Michigan State University.

== Early life ==
Appling played high school basketball at Pershing High School in Detroit. In 2009, as a junior, he led his team to win the Michigan High School Athletic Association Class A Basketball Championship. During the title game, he set a MHSAA Championship Game record by scoring 49 points, beating the previous record of 47 established by Antoine Joubert in 1983. The next year, as a senior, he was the Mr. Basketball of Michigan award winner. At the end of his high school career, he was considered a high-level recruit and was the 34th-ranked player using the RSCI (Recruiting Services Consensus Index) rankings. In his senior campaign, Appling averaged 28 points, 6 rebounds and 5 assists. He was selected to play in the 2010 McDonald's All-American Boys Game during which he scored 10 points.

== College career ==
As a freshman at MSU, Appling averaged 6.4 points and 2.8 rebounds per game while shooting over 41% from three-point range. In his sophomore year, he averaged 11.6 points, 2.9 rebounds and 3.9 assists per game. He earned All-Big Ten third-team honors while leading the Spartans to the Big Ten regular-season and tournament championship. In his junior year, he started every game and led the Spartans in scoring with 13.4 points a game and assists with 3.3 per game while earning All-Big Ten second-team honors. In his senior year, he averaged 11.2 points, 3.0 rebounds and 4.5 assists per game.

== Professional career ==
After going undrafted in the 2014 NBA draft, Appling joined the Portland Trail Blazers for the 2014 NBA Summer League. On September 23, 2014, he signed with the Los Angeles Lakers, but was later waived on October 20. On November 1, he was acquired by the Los Angeles D-Fenders as an affiliate player of the Lakers. On March 7, 2015, he was traded to the Erie BayHawks in exchange for the returning player rights to Cleveland Melvin. In 38 D-League games in 2014–15 (28 for Los Angeles, 10 for Erie), Appling averaged 10.5 points, 3.0 rebounds and 3.9 assists in 24.4 minutes per game.

In July 2015, Appling joined the Orlando Magic white team for the 2015 NBA Summer League. On September 24, he signed with the Magic, but was later waived by the team on October 19 after appearing in five preseason games. On October 31, he was reacquired by the Erie BayHawks. On January 18, 2016, he signed a 10-day contract with the Magic. He made his NBA debut that night in a 98–81 loss to the Atlanta Hawks, recording two points and one steal in eight minutes of action. On January 29, he signed a second 10-day contract with the Magic. That same day, he was named in the East All-Star team for the 2016 NBA D-League All-Star Game. On February 8, after his contract expired, he was reacquired by the BayHawks. At the season's end, he earned NBA D-League All-Defensive Team honors.

After two years away from the game due to a jail term, Appling returned to basketball for the 2018–19 season, signing with Cañeros del Este of the Dominican Republic. He later joined the Abejas de León of the Mexican league.

He signed with Pallacanestro Piacentina in Italy on March 19, 2019.

== Career statistics ==
Legend
GP	Games played	GS	Games started	MPG	Minutes per game
FG%	Field goal percentage	3P%	3-point field goal percentage	FT%	Free throw percentage
RPG	Rebounds per game	APG	Assists per game	SPG	Steals per game
BPG	Blocks per game	PPG	Points per game	**Bold**	Career high

=== NBA ===
Year	Team	GP	GS	MPG	FG%	3P%	FT%	RPG	APG	SPG	BPG	PPG
2015–16	Orlando	5	0	5.4	.250	.000	1.000	.2	.2	.2	.0	1.2
Career		5	0	5.4	.250	.000	1.000	.2	.2	.2	.0	1.2

== Personal life ==
Appling is the son of Tottie Williams and majored in sociology.

=== Legal issues ===
In July 2017, Appling was sentenced to one year in county jail and four years of probation for carrying a concealed weapon and resisting a police officer. In February 2020, Appling was charged with delivery or manufacture of 19 grams of heroin in a car he was attempting to sell. In May 2021, Appling was arrested for the shooting death of a 66-year-old man in Detroit. On February 13, 2023, Appling pled guilty to second-degree murder and a firearm charge. On March 3, 2023, Appling was sentenced to eighteen to forty years in prison for the second-degree murder and two years for the firearm charge.
