= Peter C. Appling =

American politician

Peter Crawford Appling (June 12, 1822 – February 3, 1908) served as a member of the 1869-1871 California State Assembly, representing the 4th District.

Appling was born in Clarke County, Georgia. He died in Madera, California, aged 85.
