= 2014–15 Cleveland Cavaliers season =

NBA professional basketball team season

- Conference champions
- Division champions
- Head coach: David Blatt
- General manager: David Griffin
- Owner: Dan Gilbert
- Arena: Quicken Loans Arena

Results
- Record: 53–29 (.646)
- Place: Division: 1st (Central); Conference: 2nd (Eastern)
- Playoff finish: NBA Finals (lost to Warriors 2–4)
- Stats at Basketball Reference

Local media
- Television: Fox Sports Ohio; WUAB
- Radio: WTAM; WMMS

The 2014–15 Cleveland Cavaliers season was the 45th season of the franchise in the National Basketball Association (NBA). The season was marked by the publicity the team received by signing free agent forward LeBron James, who returns to the team for his second stint after playing for them from 2003 to 2010, and trading for forward Kevin Love in the 2015 offseason. These All-Star players, added with All-Star guard Kyrie Irving, were dubbed nationally as the "Big Three". With these acquisitions, this formed a new superteam of LeBron James, Kyrie Irving, and Kevin Love in the East. Prior to the acquisition, the Cavaliers also held the first overall pick for the second straight year and used it to select Andrew Wiggins, who was later traded to the Minnesota Timberwolves as part of a three-team deal for Kevin Love.

A sub-.500 team the previous four seasons, the Cavaliers won the Central division with a 53–29 record. After a slow 19–20 start, including a stretch of 2–10 in 12 games, a number of trades turned the season around, and they finished 34–9 the rest of the way. Despite losing key players to injuries, their run continued deep in the NBA Playoffs, starting with a sweep of the Boston Celtics in four games in the first round, then defeating the Chicago Bulls in six games in the Semi-finals, before sweeping the top-seeded Atlanta Hawks in four games in the conference finals, making it to the NBA Finals, their second appearance since 2007. However, the Cavaliers' season ended with a 2–4 series loss to the Golden State Warriors in the NBA Finals, who won their fourth NBA championship, their first NBA Championship in 40 years.

== Offseason ==
In July 2014, LeBron James signed with the Cavaliers and Kevin Love was acquired through a 3-team trade in August. With these acquisitions, this formed a new superteam of LeBron James, Kyrie Irving, and Kevin Love in the East.

=== Draft picks ===
Round	Pick	Player	Position	Nationality	College/Club team
1	1	Andrew Wiggins	PF/SF	Canada	Kansas
2	33	Joe Harris	SG	United States	Virginia

== Roster ==
2014–15 Cleveland Cavaliers roster
Players

Pos.	No.	Player	Height	Weight	DOB	From
G	8	Matthew Dellavedova	6 ft 4 in (1.93 m)	200 lb (91 kg)	1990-09-08	Saint Mary's
G	12	Joe Harris	6 ft 6 in (1.98 m)	215 lb (98 kg)	1991-09-06	Virginia
C	33	Brendan Haywood	7 ft 0 in (2.13 m)	263 lb (119 kg)	1979-11-27	North Carolina
G	2	Kyrie Irving	6 ft 3 in (1.91 m)	193 lb (88 kg)	1992-03-23	Duke
F	23	LeBron James	6 ft 8 in (2.03 m)	250 lb (113 kg)	1984-12-30	St. Vincent–St. Mary HS (OH)
F	1	James Jones	6 ft 8 in (2.03 m)	215 lb (98 kg)	1980-10-04	Miami (FL)
F	0	Kevin Love	6 ft 10 in (2.08 m)	243 lb (110 kg)	1988-09-07	UCLA
F	31	Shawn Marion	6 ft 7 in (2.01 m)	228 lb (103 kg)	1978-05-07	UNLV
F	18	Mike Miller	6 ft 8 in (2.03 m)	218 lb (99 kg)	1980-02-19	Florida
C	20	Timofey Mozgov	7 ft 1 in (2.16 m)	250 lb (113 kg)	1986-07-16	Russia
C	3	Kendrick Perkins	6 ft 10 in (2.08 m)	270 lb (122 kg)	1984-11-10	Clifton J. Ozen (TX)
G	4	Iman Shumpert	6 ft 5 in (1.96 m)	220 lb (100 kg)	1990-06-26	Georgia Tech
G	5	J. R. Smith	6 ft 6 in (1.98 m)	220 lb (100 kg)	1985-09-09	St. Benedict's Prep (NJ)
F/C	13	Tristan Thompson	6 ft 9 in (2.06 m)	238 lb (108 kg)	1991-03-13	Texas
C	17	Anderson Varejão	6 ft 11 in (2.11 m)	273 lb (124 kg)	1982-09-28	Brazil

Coaches
Head coach
- David Blatt
Assistant(s)
- Jim Boylan
- Bret Brielmaier
- Larry Drew
- Phil Handy (player development)
- Tyronn Lue (associate HC)
- James Posey
- Vitaly Potapenko (player development)

Legend
- (DP) Unsigned draft pick
- (FA) Free agent
- (S) Suspended
- Injured

Roster
Updated: April 20, 2015

=== Roster notes ===
Center Anderson Varejão played 26 games (his last game being on December 23, 2014) but missed the majority of the season and the playoffs due to tearing his left Achilles tendon. He underwent successful surgery at the Cleveland Clinic on December 26, 2014.

== Preseason ==
2014 pre-season game log
Total: 5–2 (home: 4–1; road: 1–1)
Pre-season: 5–2 (home: 4–1; road: 1–1)

Game	Date	Team	Score	High points	High rebounds	High assists	Location Attendance	Record
1	October 5	Maccabi Tel Aviv	W 107–80	Kyrie Irving (16)	Anderson Varejão (15)	Kyrie Irving (5)	Quicken Loans Arena; 20,562	1–0
2	October 11	@ Miami	W 122–119 (OT)	Kevin Love (25)	Tristan Thompson (9)	LeBron James (8)	HSBC Arena; 15,411	2–0
3	October 14	Milwaukee	W 106–100	Kevin Love (25)	Shawn Marion (7)	Matthew Dellavedova (9)	Quicken Loans Arena; 19,102	3–0
4	October 15	Indiana	W 98–93	LeBron James (26)	Tristan Thompson (9)	Matthew Dellavedova (4)	Cintas Center; 10,250	4–0
5	October 17	Dallas	L 102–108	Kyrie Irving (23)	Tristan Thompson (11)	Kyrie Irving (5)	Quicken Loans Arena; 20,562	4–1
6	October 20	Chicago	W 107–98	Kyrie Irving (28)	Kevin Love (13)	Kyrie Irving (7)	Schottenstein Center; 19,049	5–1
7	October 22	@ Memphis	L 92–96	Kyrie Irving (16)	Kevin Love (8)	Dellavedova, Price (4)	FedExForum; 12,073	5–2

2014–15 pre-season schedule

== Regular season ==
=== Standings ===
Central Division	W	L	PCT	GB	Home	Road	Div	GP
y-Cleveland Cavaliers	53	29	.646	–	31‍–‍10	22‍–‍19	11–5	82
x-Chicago Bulls	50	32	.610	3.0	27‍–‍14	23‍–‍18	8–8	82
x-Milwaukee Bucks	41	41	.500	12.0	23‍–‍18	18‍–‍23	7–9	82
Indiana Pacers	38	44	.463	15.0	23‍–‍18	15‍–‍26	8–8	82
Detroit Pistons	32	50	.390	21.0	18‍–‍23	14‍–‍27	6–10	82

Eastern Conference
#	Team	W	L	PCT	GB	GP
1	c-Atlanta Hawks *	60	22	.732	–	82
2	y-Cleveland Cavaliers *	53	29	.646	7.0	82
3	x-Chicago Bulls	50	32	.610	10.0	82
4	y-Toronto Raptors *	49	33	.598	11.0	82
5	x-Washington Wizards	46	36	.561	14.0	82
6	x-Milwaukee Bucks	41	41	.500	19.0	82
7	x-Boston Celtics	40	42	.488	20.0	82
8	x-Brooklyn Nets	38	44	.463	22.0	82
9	Indiana Pacers	38	44	.463	22.0	82
10	Miami Heat	37	45	.451	23.0	82
11	Charlotte Hornets	33	49	.402	27.0	82
12	Detroit Pistons	32	50	.390	28.0	82
13	Orlando Magic	25	57	.305	35.0	82
14	Philadelphia 76ers	18	64	.220	42.0	82
15	New York Knicks	17	65	.207	43.0	82

=== Game log ===
2014–15 game log
Total: 53–29 (home: 31–10; road: 22–19)
October: 1–1 (home: 0–1; road: 1–0)

Game	Date	Team	Score	High points	High rebounds	High assists	Location Attendance	Record
1	October 30 8:00 pm	New York	L 90–95	Kyrie Irving (22)	Kevin Love (14)	Kyrie Irving (7)	Quicken Loans Arena; 20,562	0–1
2	October 31 8:00 pm	@ Chicago	W 114–108 (OT)	LeBron James (36)	Kevin Love (16)	LeBron James (4)	United Center; 22,879	1–1

November : 7–6 (home: 5–3; road: 2–3)

Game	Date	Team	Score	High points	High rebounds	High assists	Location Attendance	Record
3	November 4 10:00 pm	@ Portland	L 82–101	Kevin Love (22)	Kevin Love (10)	LeBron James (10)	Moda Center; 19,441	1–2
4	November 5 9:00 pm	@ Utah	L 100–102	Kyrie Irving (34)	Kevin Love (8)	LeBron James (4)	EnergySolutions Arena; 19,911	1–3
5	November 7 10:30 pm	@ Denver	W 110–101	LeBron James (22)	Anderson Varejão (9)	LeBron James (11)	Pepsi Center; 19,263	2–3
6	November 10 7:00 pm	New Orleans	W 118–111	LeBron James (32)	LeBron James (11)	James & Irving (9)	Quicken Loans Arena; 20,562	3–3
7	November 14 7:30 pm	@ Boston	W 122–121	LeBron James (41)	Kevin Love (15)	LeBron James (7)	TD Garden; 18,624	4–3
8	November 15 7:30 pm	Atlanta	W 127–94	LeBron James (32)	Anderson Varejão (10)	Dion Waiters (8)	Quicken Loans Arena; 20,562	5–3
9	November 17 7:00 pm	Denver	L 97–106	LeBron James (22)	Kevin Love (11)	Kyrie Irving (8)	Quicken Loans Arena; 20,562	5–4
10	November 19 7:00 pm	San Antonio	L 90–92	Anderson Varejão (23)	Love & Varejão (11)	LeBron James (9)	Quicken Loans Arena; 20,562	5–5
11	November 21 8:00 pm	@ Washington	L 78–91	James & Irving (22)	Anderson Varejão (9)	LeBron James (4)	Verizon Center; 20,356	5–6
12	November 22 7:30 pm	Toronto	L 93–110	Kevin Love (23)	Anderson Varejão (12)	LeBron James (10)	Quicken Loans Arena; 20,562	5–7
13	November 24 7:00 pm	Orlando	W 106–74	LeBron James (29)	Tristan Thompson (11)	LeBron James (11)	Quicken Loans Arena; 20,562	6–7
14	November 26 7:00 pm	Washington	W 113–87	LeBron James (29)	LeBron James (10)	LeBron James (8)	Quicken Loans Arena; 20,562	7–7
15	November 29 7:30 pm	Indiana	W 109–97	Kevin Love (28)	Tristan Thompson (11)	LeBron James (7)	Quicken Loans Arena; 20,562	8–7

December : 10–7 (home: 6–3; road: 4–4)

Game	Date	Team	Score	High points	High rebounds	High assists	Location Attendance	Record
16	December 2 7:00 pm	Milwaukee	W 111–108	Kyrie Irving (28)	Kevin Love (11)	LeBron James (10)	Quicken Loans Arena; 20,562	9–7
17	December 4 8:00 pm	@ New York	W 90–87	Kyrie Irving (37)	Kevin Love (11)	LeBron James (12)	Madison Square Garden; 19,812	10–7
18	December 5 7:30 pm	@ Toronto	W 105–91	LeBron James (24)	Tristan Thompson (14)	LeBron James (13)	Air Canada Centre; 20,077	11–7
19	December 8 7:30 pm	@ Brooklyn	W 110–88	Dion Waiters (26)	Love & Varejão (14)	LeBron James (7)	Barclays Center; 17,732	12–7
20	December 9 7:00 pm	Toronto	W 105–101	LeBron James (35)	Kevin Love (9)	Kyrie Irving (10)	Quicken Loans Arena; 20,562	13–7
21	December 11 8:00 pm	@ Oklahoma City	L 94–103	Kevin Love (26)	Kevin Love (7)	Kevin Love (8)	Chesapeake Energy Arena; 18,203	13–8
22	December 12 8:00 pm	@ New Orleans	L 114–119	LeBron James (41)	Tristan Thompson (10)	Kyrie Irving (7)	Smoothie King Center; 18,069	13–9
23	December 15 7:00 pm	Charlotte	W 97–88	LeBron James (27)	Kevin Love (18)	LeBron James (13)	Quicken Loans Arena; 20,562	14–9
24	December 17 7:00 pm	Atlanta	L 98–127	James & Waiters (21)	Kevin Love (10)	Love & Irving (6)	Quicken Loans Arena; 20,562	14–10
25	December 19 7:30 pm	Brooklyn	W 95–91	LeBron James (22)	Kevin Love (14)	LeBron James (9)	Quicken Loans Arena; 20,562	15–10
26	December 21 4:30 pm	Memphis	W 105–91	LeBron James (25)	Kevin Love (8)	James & Irving (11)	Quicken Loans Arena; 20,562	16–10
27	December 23 7:00 pm	Minnesota	W 125–104	Kyrie Irving (29)	Kevin Love (10)	Love, Irving & Waiters (4)	Quicken Loans Arena; 20,562	17–10
28	December 25 5:00 pm	@ Miami	L 91–101	LeBron James (30)	Tristan Thompson (9)	LeBron James (8)	American Airlines Arena; 19,817	17–11
29	December 26 7:00 pm	@ Orlando	W 98–89	LeBron James (29)	Tristan Thompson (13)	LeBron James (8)	Amway Center; 18,846	18–11
30	December 28 4:30 pm	Detroit	L 80–103	Kevin Love (20)	Tristan Thompson (11)	LeBron James (7)	Quicken Loans Arena; 20,562	18–12
31	December 30 7:30 pm	@ Atlanta	L 101–109	Kyrie Irving (35)	Tristan Thompson (13)	Kyrie Irving (9)	Philips Arena; 19,215	18–13
32	December 31 7:00 pm	Milwaukee	L 80–96	Kyrie Irving (25)	Tristan Thompson (13)	Matthew Dellavedova (4)	Quicken Loans Arena; 20,562	18–14

January: 11–6 (home: 6–2; road: 5–4)

Game	Date	Team	Score	High points	High rebounds	High assists	Location Attendance	Record
33	January 2 7:00 pm	@ Charlotte	W 91–87	Kevin Love (27)	Tristan Thompson (14)	Miller & Dellavedova (4)	Time Warner Cable Arena; 19,307	19–14
34	January 4 1:00 pm	Dallas	L 90–109	Kevin Love (30)	Tristan Thompson (11)	Matthew Dellavedova (7)	Quicken Loans Arena; 20,562	19–15
35	January 5 7:00 pm	@ Philadelphia	L 92–95	Kevin Love (28)	Kevin Love (19)	Matthew Dellavedova (8)	Wells Fargo Center; 17,771	19–16
36	January 7 7:00 pm	Houston	L 93–105	Kyrie Irving (38)	Kevin Love (16)	Matthew Dellavedova (5)	Quicken Loans Arena; 20,562	19–17
37	January 9 10:30 pm	@ Golden State	L 94–112	J. R. Smith (27)	Kevin Love (14)	Kyrie Irving (5)	Oracle Arena; 19,596	19–18
38	January 11 9:00 pm	@ Sacramento	L 84–103	Kevin Love (25)	Timofey Mozgov (12)	Kyrie Irving (7)	Sleep Train Arena; 16,143	19–19
39	January 13 9:00 pm	@ Phoenix	L 100–107	LeBron James (33)	Shawn Marion (11)	Kyrie Irving (6)	US Airways Center; 16,819	19–20
40	January 15 10:30 pm	@ L.A. Lakers	W 109–102	LeBron James (36)	Tristan Thompson (11)	LeBron James (5)	Staples Center; 18,997	20–20
41	January 16 10:30 pm	@ L.A. Clippers	W 126–121	Kyrie Irving (37)	Tristan Thompson (12)	LeBron James (7)	Staples Center; 19,380	21–20
42	January 19 7:30 pm	Chicago	W 108–94	LeBron James (26)	Timofey Mozgov (15)	Kyrie Irving (12)	Quicken Loans Arena; 20,562	22–20
43	January 21 7:00 pm	Utah	W 106–92	LeBron James (26)	Kevin Love (13)	LeBron James (9)	Quicken Loans Arena; 20,562	23–20
44	January 23 7:30 pm	Charlotte	W 129–90	LeBron James (25)	Timofey Mozgov (10)	LeBron James (9)	Quicken Loans Arena; 20,562	24–20
45	January 25 3:30 pm	Oklahoma City	W 108–98	LeBron James (34)	Kevin Love (13)	Kyrie Irving (6)	Quicken Loans Arena; 20,562	25–20
46	January 27 7:30 pm	@ Detroit	W 103–95	Kyrie Irving (38)	Tristan Thompson (12)	LeBron James (7)	The Palace of Auburn Hills; 18,178	26–20
47	January 28 7:00 pm	Portland	W 99–94	Kyrie Irving (55)	Kevin Love (12)	Kyrie Irving (5)	Quicken Loans Arena; 20,562	27–20
48	January 30 7:30 pm	Sacramento	W 101–90	Kevin Love (23)	Kevin Love (10)	LeBron James (7)	Quicken Loans Arena; 20,562	28–20
49	January 31 8:00 pm	@ Minnesota	W 106–90	LeBron James (36)	Kevin Love (17)	LeBron James (5)	Target Center; 19,356	29–20

February: 8–3 (home: 5–0; road: 3–3)

Game	Date	Team	Score	High points	High rebounds	High assists	Location Attendance	Record
50	February 2 7:00 pm	Philadelphia	W 97–84	Kyrie Irving (24)	Kevin Love (15)	LeBron James (11)	Quicken Loans Arena; 20,562	30–20
51	February 5 8:00 pm	L.A. Clippers	W 105–94	Kevin Love (24)	Tristan Thompson (10)	LeBron James (9)	Quicken Loans Arena; 20,562	31–20
52	February 6 7:00 pm	@ Indiana	L 99–103	Kyrie Irving (29)	Timofey Mozgov (9)	James & Irving (5)	Bankers Life Fieldhouse; 18,165	31–21
53	February 8 3:30 pm	L.A. Lakers	W 120–105	Kevin Love (32)	Kevin Love (10)	Kyrie Irving (10)	Quicken Loans Arena; 20,562	32–21
54	February 11 8:00 pm	Miami	W 113–93	Timofey Mozgov (20)	LeBron James (10)	James & Smith (7)	Quicken Loans Arena; 20,562	33–21
55	February 12 8:00 pm	@ Chicago	L 98–113	LeBron James (31)	Timofey Mozgov (11)	Kyrie Irving (7)	United Center; 21,920	33–22
All-Star Break
56	February 20 8:00 pm	@ Washington	W 127–89	LeBron James (28)	Tristan Thompson (9)	Kyrie Irving (7)	Verizon Center; 21,920	34–22
57	February 22 1:00 pm	@ New York	W 101–83	James & Irving (18)	Kevin Love (16)	James & Shumpert (7)	Madison Square Garden; 19,812	35–22
58	February 24 7:30 pm	@ Detroit	W 102–93	Kevin Love (24)	Kevin Love (9)	LeBron James (11)	The Palace of Auburn Hills; 19,087	36–22
59	February 26 8:00 pm	Golden State	W 110–99	LeBron James (42)	LeBron James (11)	James & Smith (5)	Quicken Loans Arena; 20,562	37–22
60	February 27 7:00 pm	@ Indiana	L 86–93	J. R. Smith (21)	Love, Dellavedova & Shumpert (10)	Matthew Dellavedova (5)	Bankers Life Fieldhouse; 18,165	37–23

March : 11–4 (home: 5–0; road: 6–4)

Game	Date	Team	Score	High points	High rebounds	High assists	Location Attendance	Record
61	March 1 3:30 pm	@ Houston	L 103–105 (OT)	LeBron James (37)	Tristan Thompson (19)	James, Smith & Dellavedova (4)	Toyota Center; 18,345	37–24
62	March 3 7:00 pm	Boston	W 110–79	LeBron James (27)	Kevin Love (8)	Matthew Dellavedova (7)	Quicken Loans Arena; 20,562	38–24
63	March 4 7:30 pm	@ Toronto	W 120–112	LeBron James (29)	Kevin Love (10)	LeBron James (14)	Air Canada Centre; 19,800	39–24
64	March 6 7:30 pm	@ Atlanta	L 97–106	Kyrie Irving (20)	Kevin Love (8)	LeBron James (8)	Philips Arena; 19,244	39–25
65	March 7 7:30 pm	Phoenix	W 89–79	Timofey Mozgov (19)	Tristan Thompson (12)	LeBron James (8)	Quicken Loans Arena; 20,562	40–25
66	March 10 8:30 pm	@ Dallas	W 127–94	LeBron James (27)	Kevin Love (14)	LeBron James (8)	American Airlines Center; 20,501	41–25
67	March 12 9:30 pm	@ San Antonio	W 128–125 (OT)	Kyrie Irving (57)	Tristan Thompson (7)	LeBron James (9)	AT&T Center; 18,581	42–25
68	March 15 6:00 pm	@ Orlando	W 123–108	Kyrie Irving (33)	LeBron James (8)	LeBron James (13)	Amway Center; 17,786	43–25
69	March 16 8:00 pm	@ Miami	L 92–106	LeBron James (26)	Tristan Thompson (8)	Kyrie Irving (6)	American Airlines Arena; 19,626	43–26
70	March 18 7:00 pm	Brooklyn	W 117–92	Mozgov & Smith (17)	Kevin Love (11)	Kyrie Irving (10)	Quicken Loans Arena; 20,562	44–26
71	March 20 7:30 pm	Indiana	W 95–92	LeBron James (29)	Kevin Love (13)	James & Dellavedova (5)	Quicken Loans Arena; 20,562	45–26
72	March 22 3:00 pm	@ Milwaukee	W 108–90	LeBron James (28)	LeBron James (10)	Kyrie Irving (7)	BMO Harris Bradley Center; 16,687	46–26
73	March 25 8:00 pm	@ Memphis	W 111–89	Kyrie Irving (24)	Tristan Thompson (11)	J. R. Smith (6)	FedExForum; 18,119	47–26
74	March 27 7:30 pm	@ Brooklyn	L 98–106	Kyrie Irving (26)	Tristan Thompson (9)	LeBron James (9)	Barclays Center; 17,732	47–27
75	March 29 4:30 pm	Philadelphia	W 87–86	LeBron James (20)	LeBron James (11)	LeBron James (6)	Quicken Loans Arena; 20,562	48–27

April : 5–2 (home: 4–1; road: 1–1)

Game	Date	Team	Score	High points	High rebounds	High assists	Location Attendance	Record
76	April 2 8:00 pm	Miami	W 114–88	James & Irving (23)	Tristan Thompson (15)	LeBron James (7)	Quicken Loans Arena; 20,562	49–27
77	April 5 3:30 pm	Chicago	W 99–94	Kyrie Irving (27)	LeBron James (10)	LeBron James (12)	Quicken Loans Arena; 20,562	50–27
78	April 8 8:00 pm	@ Milwaukee	W 104–99	Kyrie Irving (27)	Kevin Love (11)	Kyrie Irving (9)	BMO Harris Bradley Center; 14,629	51–27
79	April 10 7:30 pm	Boston	L 90–99	Kevin Love (19)	Tristan Thompson (12)	Matthew Dellavedova (8)	Quicken Loans Arena; 20,562	51–28
80	April 12 3:00 pm	@ Boston	L 78–117	Iman Shumpert (15)	Iman Shumpert (10)	Matthew Dellavedova (9)	TD Garden; 18,624	51–29
81	April 13 7:00 pm	Detroit	W 109–97	J. R. Smith (28)	Timofey Mozgov (13)	LeBron James (11)	Quicken Loans Arena; 20,562	52–29
82	April 15 8:00 pm	Washington	W 113–108 (OT)	Kevin Love (19)	Shawn Marion (9)	Matthew Dellavedova (12)	Quicken Loans Arena; 20,562	53–29

2014–15 season schedule

Detailed records

Eastern Conference
Opponent	Home	Away	Total	Points scored	Points against
Atlantic Division
Boston Celtics
Brooklyn Nets
New York Knicks
Philadelphia 76ers
Toronto Raptors
Central Division
Chicago Bulls
Cleveland Cavaliers	–	–	–	–	–
Detroit Pistons
Indiana Pacers
Milwaukee Bucks
Southeast Division
Atlanta Hawks	1–1	0–2	1–3	423	436
Charlotte Hornets
Miami Heat
Orlando Magic
Washington Wizards

Western Conference
Opponent	Home	Away	Total	Points scored	Points against
Northwest Division
Denver Nuggets
Minnesota Timberwolves
Oklahoma City Thunder
Portland Trail Blazers
Utah Jazz
Pacific Division
Golden State Warriors
Los Angeles Clippers
Los Angeles Lakers
Phoenix Suns
Sacramento Kings
Southwest Division
Dallas Mavericks
Houston Rockets
Memphis Grizzlies
New Orleans Pelicans
San Antonio Spurs

== Playoffs ==
2015 playoff game log
Total: 14–6 (home: 7–3; road: 7–3)
First Round: 4–0 (home: 2–0; road: 2–0)

Game	Date	Team	Score	High points	High rebounds	High assists	Location Attendance	Series
1	April 19 3:00 pm	Boston	W 113–100	Kyrie Irving (30)	Kevin Love (12)	LeBron James (7)	Quicken Loans Arena; 20,562	1–0
2	April 21 7:00 pm	Boston	W 99–91	LeBron James (30)	Tristan Thompson (11)	LeBron James (7)	Quicken Loans Arena; 20,562	2–0
3	April 23 7:00 pm	@ Boston	W 103–95	LeBron James (31)	LeBron James (11)	Kyrie Irving (6)	TD Garden; 18,624	3–0
4	April 26 1:00 pm	@ Boston	W 101–93	LeBron James (27)	Mozgov & Irving (11)	LeBron James (8)	TD Garden; 18,624	4–0

Conference Semifinals: 4–2 (home: 2–1; road: 2–1)

Game	Date	Team	Score	High points	High rebounds	High assists	Location Attendance	Series
1	May 4 7:00 pm	Chicago	L 92–99	Kyrie Irving (30)	LeBron James (15)	Kyrie Irving (6)	Quicken Loans Arena; 20,562	0–1
2	May 6 7:00 pm	Chicago	W 106–91	LeBron James (33)	Tristan Thompson (12)	Matthew Dellavedova (9)	Quicken Loans Arena; 20,562	1–1
3	May 8 8:00 pm	@ Chicago	L 96–99	LeBron James (27)	Tristan Thompson (13)	LeBron James (14)	United Center; 22,246	1–2
4	May 10 3:30 pm	@ Chicago	W 86–84	LeBron James (25)	LeBron James (14)	LeBron James (8)	United Center; 22,256	2–2
5	May 12 7:00 pm	Chicago	W 106–101	LeBron James (38)	LeBron James (12)	LeBron James (6)	Quicken Loans Arena; 20,562	3–2
6	May 14 8:00 pm	@ Chicago	W 94–73	Matthew Dellavedova (19)	Tristan Thompson (17)	LeBron James (11)	United Center; 22,695	4–2

Eastern Conference Finals: 4–0 (home: 2–0; road: 2–0)

Game	Date	Team	Score	High points	High rebounds	High assists	Location Attendance	Record
1	May 20 8:30 pm	@ Atlanta	W 97–89	LeBron James (31)	Timofey Mozgov (11)	Irving & James (6)	Philips Arena; 18,489	1–0
2	May 22 8:30 pm	@ Atlanta	W 94–82	LeBron James (30)	Tristan Thompson (16)	LeBron James (11)	Philips Arena; 18,670	2–0
3	May 24 8:30 pm	Atlanta	W 114–111 (OT)	LeBron James (37)	LeBron James (18)	LeBron James (13)	Quicken Loans Arena; 20,562	3–0
4	May 26 8:30 pm	Atlanta	W 118–88	LeBron James (23)	Tristan Thompson (11)	LeBron James (7)	Quicken Loans Arena; 20,562	4–0

NBA Finals: 2–4 (home: 1–2; road: 1–2)

Game	Date	Team	Score	High points	High rebounds	High assists	Location Attendance	Record
1	June 4	@ Golden State	L 100–108 (OT)	LeBron James (44)	Tristan Thompson (15)	Kyrie Irving (6); LeBron James (6)	Oracle Arena; 19,596	0–1
2	June 7	@ Golden State	W 95–93 (OT)	LeBron James (39)	LeBron James (16)	LeBron James (11)	Oracle Arena; 19,596	1–1
3	June 9	Golden State	W 96–91	LeBron James (40)	Tristan Thompson (13)	LeBron James (8)	Quicken Loans Arena; 20,562	2–1
4	June 11	Golden State	L 82–103	Timofey Mozgov (28)	Tristan Thompson (13)	LeBron James (8)	Quicken Loans Arena; 20,562	2–2
5	June 14	@ Golden State	L 91–104	LeBron James (40)	LeBron James (14)	LeBron James (11)	Oracle Arena; 19,596	2–3
6	June 16	Golden State	L 97–105	LeBron James (32)	LeBron James (18)	LeBron James (9)	Quicken Loans Arena; 20,562	2–4

2015 playoff schedule

== Player statistics ==
Legend
GP	Games played	GS	Games started	MPG	Minutes per game
FG%	Field-goal percentage	3P%	3-point field-goal percentage	FT%	Free-throw percentage
RPG	Rebounds per game	APG	Assists per game	SPG	Steals per game
BPG	Blocks per game	PPG	Points per game

=== Summer League ===
Player	GP	GS	MPG	FG%	3P%	FT%	RPG	APG	SPG	BPG	PPG
Anthony Bennett	4	4	29.8	.426	.250	.600	7.8	0.8	0.8	0.0	13.3
Will Cherry	5	2	25.2	.251	.235	.714	4.0	3.0	0.2	0.0	12.8
Jack Cooley	5	4	16.0	.615	.000	.500	4.4	0.2	0.4	0.2	7.4
Matthew Dellavedova	3	3	32.0	.435	.273	.800	4.7	4.7	1.0	0.0	11.7
Shane Edwards	5	0	14.8	.647	.000	.824	3.6	0.4	0.6	1.2	7.2
Carrick Felix	5	1	14.2	.471	.444	.667	3.0	0.6	0.8	0.2	4.4
Jayson Granger	4	0	9.3	.364	.200	.000	1.3	1.0	0.2	0.0	2.3
Steven Gray	4	0	13.3	.375	.313	.600	1.3	1.5	0.2	0.0	6.5
Joe Harris	4	4	24.8	.391	.400	.818	1.5	1.5	0.5	0.2	7.8
Scotty Hopson	1	1	14.0	.500	.500	1.000	1.0	1.0	0.0	0.0	7.0
Sergey Karasev	1	1	34.0	.444	.500	.500	4.0	3.0	1.0	0.0	11.0
Alex Kirk	5	1	15.4	.524	.000	.667	3.4	0.4	0.6	0.4	5.2
Dwight Powell	3	1	11.3	.500	.000	1.000	3.7	0.7	0.3	0.3	5.0
Andrew Wiggins	4	4	30.0	.405	.154	.703	3.5	0.3	1.2	1.5	15.5
Totals	—	—	200	.469	.272	.725	35.8	12.0	5.8	3.6	84.6

=== Preseason ===
Player	GP	GS	MPG	FG%	3P%	FT%	RPG	APG	SPG	BPG	PPG
Lou Amundson	5	0	6.7	.300	.000	.000	2.6	0.0	0.2	0.2	1.2
Matthew Dellavedova	6	3	27.2	.433	.294	.000	3.0	4.33	0 67	0.0	5.17
Shane Edwards	5	0	6.5	.200	.000	1.000	1.4	0.2	0.2	0.0	1.0
Joe Harris	5	0	17.5	.364	.381	1.000	2.2	2.0	0.4	0.0	7.4
Brendan Haywood	3	1	10.2	.400	.000	1.000	2.33	0.33	0.33	1.00	3.67
Kyrie Irving	3	2	27.3	.538	.455	1.000	2.0	5.0	1.5	1.5	19.5
LeBron James	5	4	22.6	.486	.462	.750	3.25	4.75	0.5	0.25	14.25
James Jones	3	0	9.5	.500	.600	1.000	0.33	0.33	0.0	0.0	4.00
Alex Kirk	4	0	15.4	.412	.000	1.000	3.0	0.25	0.0	1.0	5.5
Kevin Love	5	4	21.8	.571	.588	.772	6.5	2.25	0.25	0.0	15.75
Shawn Marion	5	1	20.1	.333	.000	.750	4.75	0.75	0.75	0.5	5.00
Mike Miller	6	0	14.2	.263	.188	1.000	1.8	1.4	0.2	0.2	3.4
A. J. Price	5	0	13.5	.517	.421	.750	1.4	1.0	0.0	0.0	8.2
Tristan Thompson	5	2	25.1	.588	.000	.789	10.5	1.0	1.0	0.5	13.75
Anderson Varejao	5	3	20.9	.542	.000	.700	7.25	1.25	1.5	0.25	8.25
Dion Waiters	6	5	27.1	.426	.385	.800	2.8	2.6	0.2	0.6	15.2

=== Regular season ===
Player	GP	GS	MPG	FG%	3P%	FT%	RPG	APG	SPG	BPG	PPG
LeBron James	69	69	36.1	.488	.354	.710	6.0	7.4	1.6	0.7	25.3
Kyrie Irving	75	75	36.4	.468	.415	.863	3.2	5.2	1.5	0.3	21.7
Kevin Love	75	75	33.8	.434	.367	.804	9.7	2.2	0.7	0.5	16.4
J. R. Smith	46	45	31.8	.425	.390	.818	3.5	2.5	1.4	0.4	12.7
Timofey Mozgov	46	45	25.0	.590	.000	.787	6.9	0.8	0.4	1.2	10.6
Dion Waiters	33	3	23.8	.404	.256	.783	1.7	2.2	1.3	0.3	10.5
Anderson Varejao	26	26	24.5	.555	.000	.733	6.5	1.3	1.1	0.6	9.8
Tristan Thompson	82	15	26.8	.547	.000	.641	8.0	0.5	0.4	0.7	8.5
Iman Shumpert	38	1	24.2	.410	.338	.667	3.8	1.5	1.3	0.3	7.2
Matthew Dellavedova	67	13	20.6	.362	.407	.763	1.9	3.0	0.4	0	4.8
Shawn Marion	57	24	19.3	.446	.261	.765	3.5	0.9	0.5	0.5	4.8
James Jones	57	2	11.7	.368	.360	.848	1.1	0.4	0.2	0.1	4.4
Joe Harris	51	1	9.7	.400	.369	.600	0.8	0.5	0.1	0	2.7
Kendrick Perkins	17	0	9.8	.488	.000	.500	2.4	0.5	0.1	0.2	2.6
Mike Miller	52	15	13.5	.325	.327	.750	1.8	0.9	0.3	0.1	2.1
A.J. Price	11	0	7.9	.265	.000	.667	1.4	1.2	0.3	0	2.0
Will Cherry	8	0	8.6	.263	.222	.500	0.6	1.0	0.8	0.1	1.9
Brendan Haywood	22	1	5.4	.467	.000	.538	1.3	0.1	0.1	0.5	1.6
Lou Amundson	12	0	6.6	.333	.000	.600	1.7	0.4	0.1	0	0.9
Alex Kirk	5	0	2.8	.250	.000	1.000	0.2	0.2	0	0	0.8

== Records ==
- On March 12, Kyrie Irving set a Cavaliers franchise record with 57 points in an overtime victory against the San Antonio Spurs. It was also the first time in Gregg Popovich's coaching career that an opposing player has scored 50 points against his team.
- On May 24, LeBron James became the first player in NBA history to put up 37+ points, 18+ rebounds, and 13+ assists in a playoff game. He achieved the feat in an overtime win against the Atlanta Hawks in Game 3 of the Eastern Conference finals.
- On May 26, LeBron James and James Jones became the first players to reach five consecutive NBA Finals since several Boston Celtics accomplished the feat in 1966. James and Jones are the first to do so with two teams (also with the Miami Heat).
