= Mozgov =

Mozgov (Russian: Мозгов) is a Russian surname meaning "brains". Notable people with the surname include:

- Sergey Mozgov (born 1995), Russian ice dancer
- Timofey Mozgov (born 1986), Russian basketball player who plays in the National Basketball Association
