= Dion Waiters =

American basketball player (born 1991)

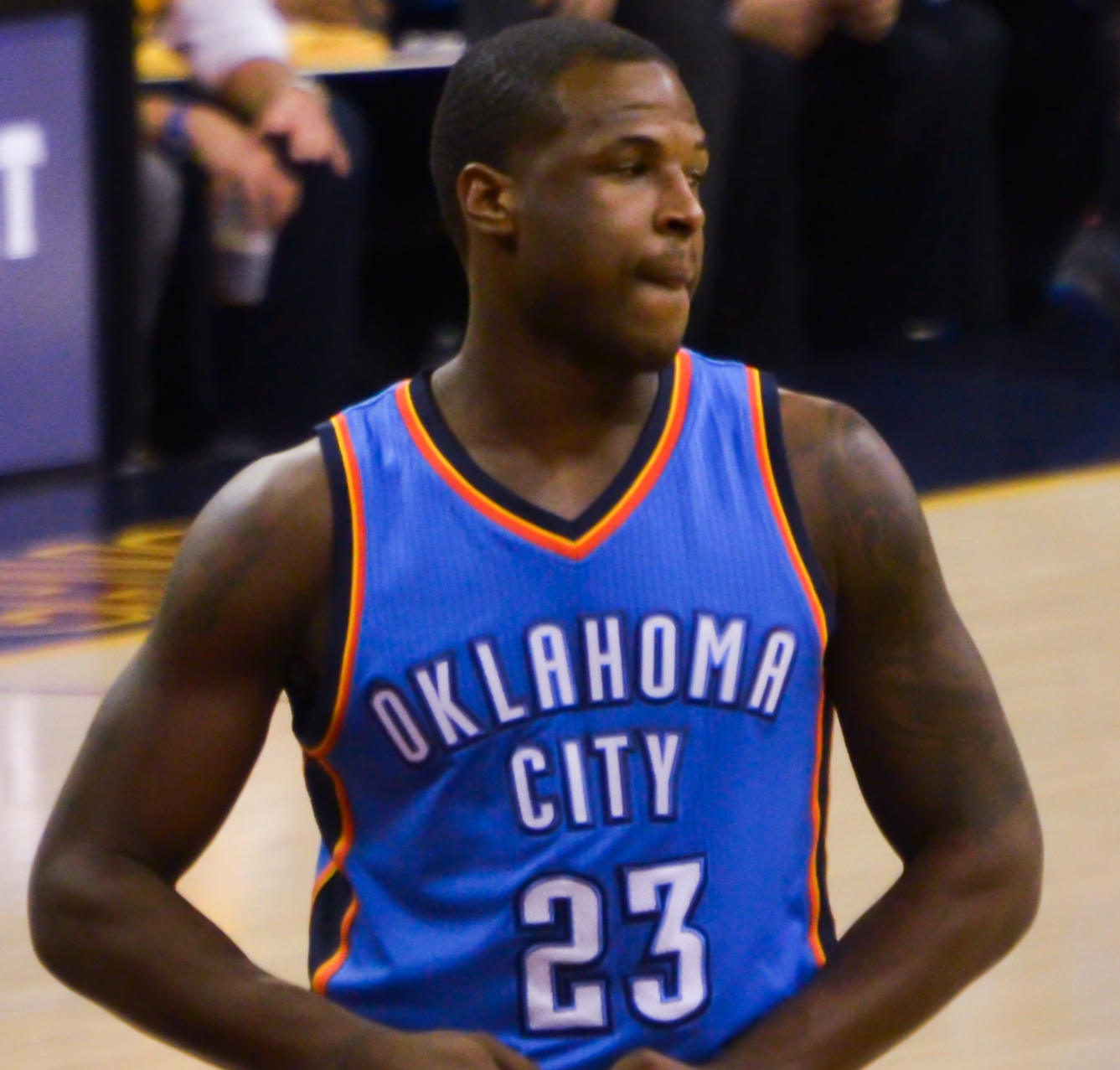
- Waiters with the Oklahoma City Thunder in 2015

Personal information
- Born: December 10, 1991 (age 34) Philadelphia, Pennsylvania, U.S.
- Listed height: 6 ft 3 in (1.91 m)
- Listed weight: 210 lb (95 kg)

Career information
- High school: Life Center Academy (Burlington, New Jersey)
- College: Syracuse (2010–2012)
- NBA draft: 2012: 1st round, 4th overall pick
- Drafted by: Cleveland Cavaliers
- Playing career: 2012–2020
- Position: Shooting guard
- Number: 3, 23, 11, 18

Career history
- 2012–2015: Cleveland Cavaliers
- 2015–2016: Oklahoma City Thunder
- 2016–2020: Miami Heat
- 2020: Los Angeles Lakers

Career highlights
- NBA champion (2020); NBA All-Rookie First Team (2013); Third-team All-Big East (2012); Big East Sixth Man of the Year (2012); Second-team Parade All-American (2010)
- Stats at NBA.com
- Stats at Basketball Reference

Dion Waiters Jr. (born December 10, 1991) is an American former professional basketball player who played eight seasons in the National Basketball Association (NBA) from 2012 to 2020. He played college basketball for the Syracuse Orange and was selected with the fourth overall pick in the 2012 NBA draft by the Cleveland Cavaliers. Waiters also played for the Oklahoma City Thunder, Miami Heat, and the Los Angeles Lakers, where his team won an NBA championship.

== Early life ==
Born in Philadelphia, Pennsylvania, to Dion Waiters Sr. and Monique Brown, Waiters was raised by his mother, who had him when she was 17; his father was in jail at the time of his birth. Four hours after Waiters was born, his grandmother died. Waiters grew up playing basketball wherever he could, regardless of weather or time of day. Away from basketball, his home life revolved around his mother and stepfather, James Barnes.

== High school career ==
As a freshman, Waiters attended Bartram High School and South Philadelphia High School in Philadelphia, but did not play basketball at either school. Waiters committed to Syracuse during the summer after his freshman year despite not having played a minute of high school basketball. In his sophomore year of high school, Waiters attended South Kent School. Waiters then played basketball at Life Center Academy his junior and senior years. Following his senior year, Waiters was ranked as the 15th best overall recruit according to ESPNU and ranked as the No. 2 best shooting guard in the ESPN 100. Waiters was also ranked as the 29th best overall recruit by Rivals.com.

== College career ==
=== Freshman season ===
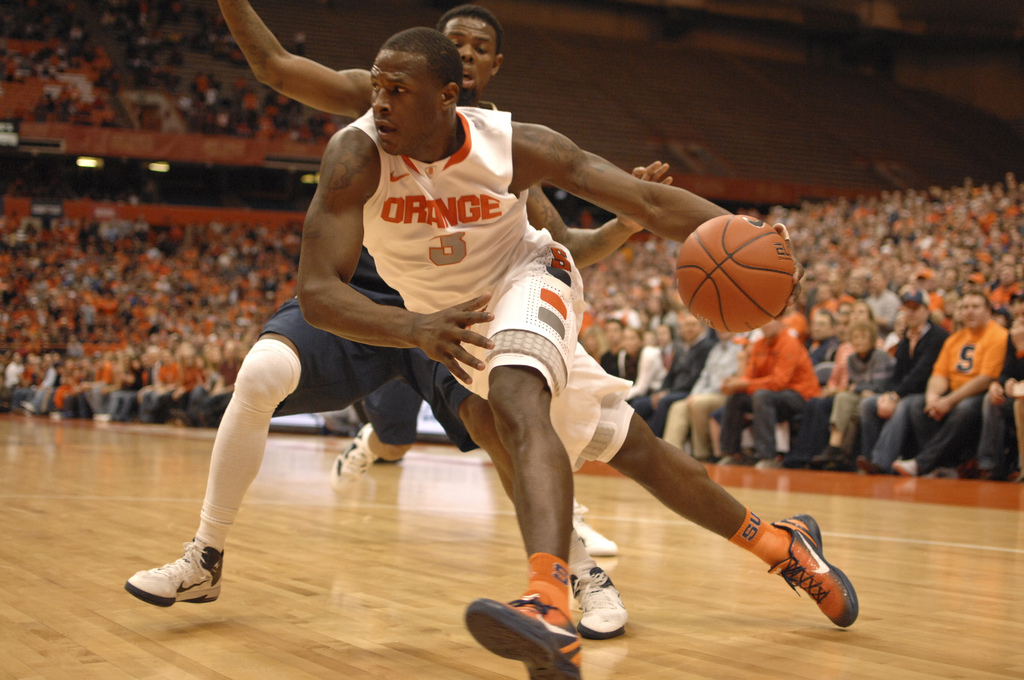
Waiters with Syracuse in January 2012

In his freshman season at Syracuse, Waiters averaged 6.6 points, 1.5 assists and 1.6 rebounds per game. In a second round loss to Marquette in the NCAA Tournament, Waiters shot 8-for-10 with 18 points.

=== Sophomore season ===
In his sophomore season at Syracuse, Waiters averaged 12.6 points, 2.5 assists and 2.3 rebounds per game. He was named the Big East Conference Sixth Man of the Year, earned third-team All-Big East honors, was named AP Honorable Mention All-American, and was selected to the All-Big East Tournament team.

== Professional career ==
=== Cleveland Cavaliers (2012–2015) ===
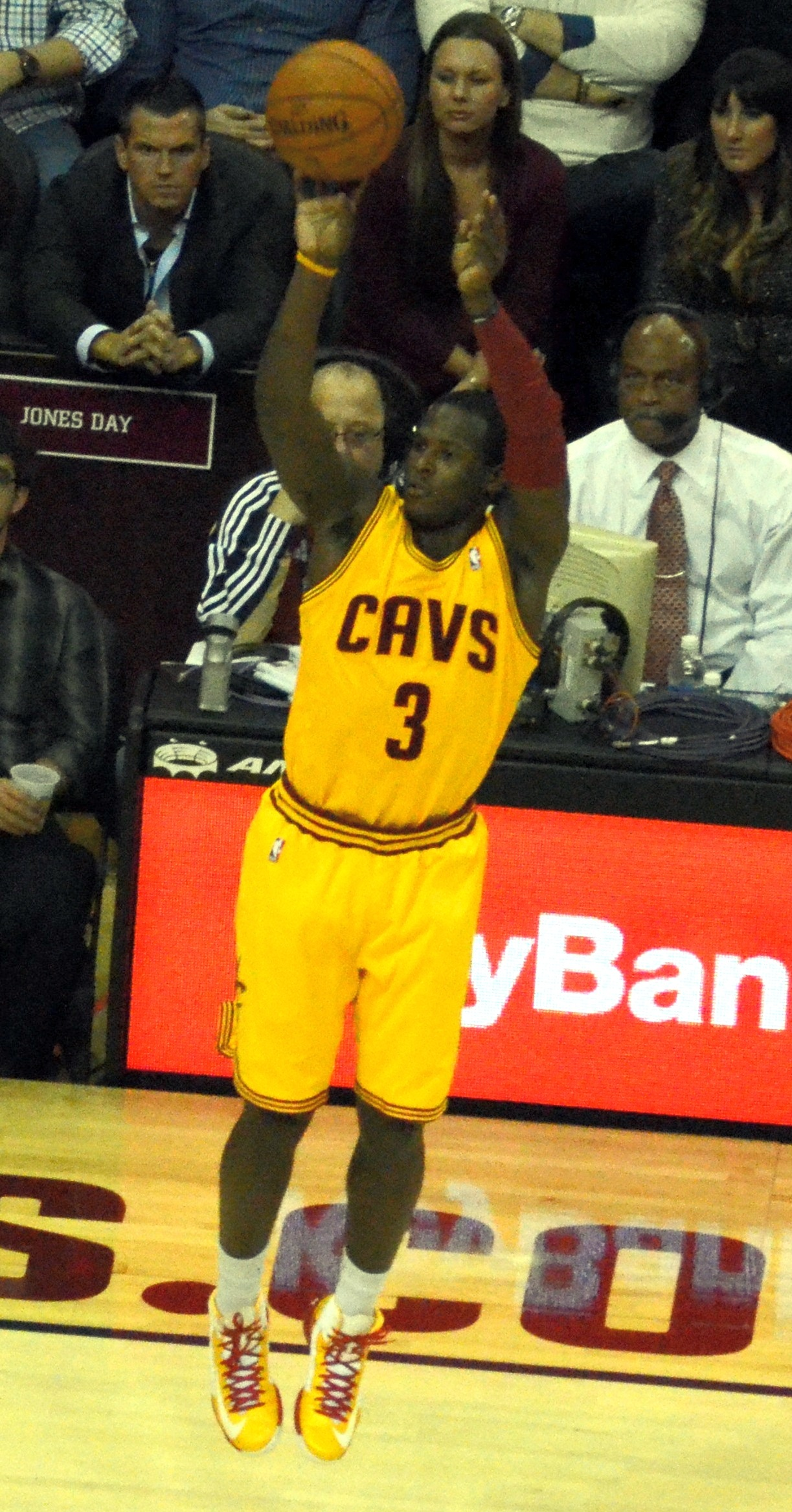
Waiters with Cavaliers in November 2012

Waiters was selected fourth overall in the 2012 NBA draft by the Cleveland Cavaliers despite choosing not to work out for any teams before the draft. This was a choice he made after receiving a promise from a team in the middle of the lottery that they would draft him if available. Many scouts also found it a surprise that Waiters was drafted so high because he did not start in college and played zone defense at Syracuse.

On January 14, 2013, Waiters scored a career-high 33 points against the Sacramento Kings, doing so on 12-of-18 shooting. Waiters was selected to play in the Rising Stars Challenge game during 2013 NBA All-Star Weekend, along with teammates Kyrie Irving, Tristan Thompson, and Tyler Zeller. Waiters came off the bench to score 23 points for Team Shaq. Throughout his rookie season, Waiters both started and came off the bench for the Cavaliers. He was consistently bothered by a sprained ankle and loose cartilage in his knee, forcing him to miss 21 games over the year.

After his rookie season, Waiters was graded as the fourth-best overall rookie by NBA.com and placed fifth in NBA Rookie of the Year voting with 21 points.

On February 14, 2014, Waiters participated in the BBVA Rising Stars Challenge. He finished the game with 31 points and 7 assists.

On March 18, 2014, Waiters recorded his first career double-double with 17 points and a career-high 11 assists in a loss to the Miami Heat.

On November 5, 2014, Waiters was absent for the U.S. national anthem and was quoted saying that he stayed in the locker room because of his Muslim faith. He later stated that the report about his religious beliefs having anything to do with him skipping the national anthem was entirely false.

=== Oklahoma City Thunder (2015–2016) ===
On January 5, 2015, Waiters was traded to the Oklahoma City Thunder from the Cavaliers in a three-team trade that also involved the New York Knicks. Cleveland received Iman Shumpert and J. R. Smith from the Knicks and a first-round pick in the 2015 NBA draft from the Thunder, while Cleveland sent Lou Amundson, Alex Kirk, and a second-round pick in the 2019 NBA draft to the Knicks, and the Thunder sent Lance Thomas to the Knicks. After a poor debut for the Thunder against the Sacramento Kings on January 7 where he scored 4 points on 1-of-9 shooting, he scored 15 points on 7-of-14 shooting two days later to help the Thunder defeat the Utah Jazz, 99–94. On April 15, 2015, in the team's final game of the season, Waiters tied his career-high with 33 points in a 138–113 win over the Minnesota Timberwolves.

Waiters garnered a bench role for the Thunder in 2015–16 under new head coach Billy Donovan. He started in just two games for the team over the first half of the season, playing back up to André Roberson. On November 10, 2015, he scored a season-high 25 points in a 125–101 win over the Washington Wizards. With a knee injury to Roberson in late January, Donovan entrusted Waiters with stepping up to a starting role. On January 26, in his first start since November 22, Waiters scored 14 points in a 128–122 overtime win over the New York Knicks. He returned to the bench on February 24 following Roberson's return from injury. On April 6, he tied his season-high with 25 points in a 120–115 loss to the Portland Trail Blazers. In Game 2 of the Thunder's semi-final series against the San Antonio Spurs, with San Antonio trailing 98–97 with 13.5 seconds remaining and Oklahoma City out of timeouts, Waiters elbowed Spurs guard Manu Ginóbili to get the space needed to inbound the ball. Following the game, Waiters and the referees were highly scrutinized by the public and media personnel.

On June 27, 2016, the Thunder tendered a qualifying offer to make Waiters a restricted free agent. However, on July 18, the Thunder rescinded their qualifying offer, allowing him to become an unrestricted free agent.

=== Miami Heat (2016–2020) ===
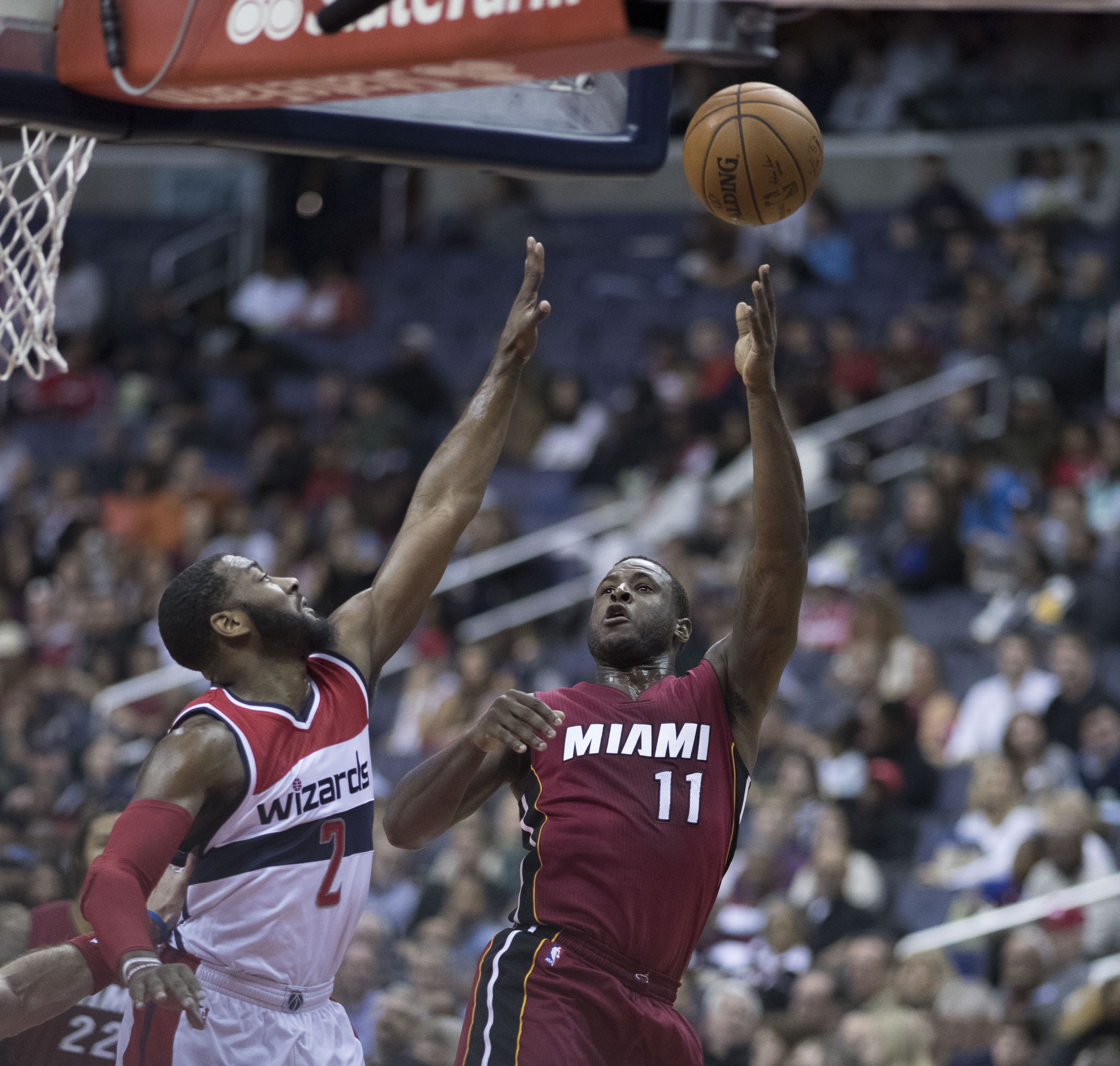
Waiters with the Heat in November 2016

On July 26, 2016, Waiters signed with the Miami Heat. He made his debut for the Heat in their season opener on October 26 against the Orlando Magic. In 34 minutes as a starter, he recorded nine points, six rebounds and four assists in a 108–96 win. On November 26, he scored a then season-high 28 points in a 110–107 loss to the Memphis Grizzlies. Four days later, he was ruled out for two weeks after an MRI revealed he had suffered a Pectineus tear. He returned to action on January 4, 2017, against the Sacramento Kings after missing 20 straight games. On January 21, he tied a career-high with 33 points in a 109–97 win over the Milwaukee Bucks. Two days later, he made a three-pointer with 0.6 seconds left to cap his second-straight 33-point effort, as he lifted the Heat to a 105–102 win over the Golden State Warriors. He finished the game with six three-pointers on eight attempts. On January 30, 2017, he was named Eastern Conference Player of the Week for games played Monday, January 23 through Sunday, January 29. Waiters led the Heat to a 4–0 week as Miami extended its winning streak to seven games. He averaged 23.3 points (tied for eighth in the East), 5.0 assists and 4.5 rebounds. Waiters missed the final 13 games of the season with an ankle injury, as the Heat missed a playoff spot with a ninth-seed finish and a 41–41 record.

On July 7, 2017, Waiters re-signed with the Heat. On October 30, 2017, he tied his career high with 33 points in a 125–122 overtime loss to the Minnesota Timberwolves. In January 2018, his long-problematic left ankle forced him to the sidelines indefinitely, and on January 22, he underwent successful surgery to repair instability in the left ankle. A preexisting navicular bone fracture was also repaired.

On December 28, 2018, Waiters was sent to Miami's NBA G League affiliate team, the Sioux Falls Skyforce, for a rehabilitation assignment. On January 2, 2019, he made his return for the Heat, scoring seven points in six minutes in a 117–92 win over the Cleveland Cavaliers. It was his first game since December 22, 2017. Far from 100 percent fit, he played the game due to Dwyane Wade being sidelined by a virus. His second game of the season came on January 8, scoring a team-high 15 points in a 103–99 loss to the Denver Nuggets.

On October 19, 2019, Waiters was suspended for Miami's 2019–20 season debut game for "conduct detrimental to the team." On November 8, Waiters missed a game against the Los Angeles Lakers due to a panic attack he experienced while flying to the game. His panic attack stemmed from over-consumption of THC-infused edibles. Two days later, the Heat suspended Waiters for 10 games, including the previous game he missed, for the consumed edible. On December 12, the Heat suspended him again, this time for six games, for calling in to work with an illness, then posting a picture of himself on his Instagram page on a boat celebrating his birthday. On January 24, 2020, Waiters made his season debut scoring 14 points in a 122–117 loss against the Los Angeles Clippers.

On February 6, 2020, Waiters was traded to the Memphis Grizzlies in a three-team trade also involving the Minnesota Timberwolves and three days later, he was waived by the Grizzlies.

=== Los Angeles Lakers (2020) ===
On March 6, 2020, Waiters signed with the Los Angeles Lakers. On July 30, 2020, he made his Lakers debut in a 103–101 win against the Los Angeles Clippers, scoring 11 points.

The Lakers went on to make the 2020 NBA Finals, facing the Miami Heat. The Lakers beat the Heat in 6 games to give Waiters his first championship.

On August 8, 2023, the Golden State Warriors held a free agent workout with Waiters.

== Hiatus ==
Waiters' most recent professional stint was in the 2019–20 NBA season, before taking a break for three years. During his hiatus, he suffered from depression. On July 13, 2023, he held a private workout in front of NBA scouts at the Victoria Fertitta Middle School, for a chance to re-join the league.

== Career statistics ==
Legend
| GP | Games played | GS | Games started | MPG | Minutes per game |
| FG% | Field goal percentage | 3P% | 3-point field goal percentage | FT% | Free throw percentage |
| RPG | Rebounds per game | APG | Assists per game | SPG | Steals per game |
| BPG | Blocks per game | PPG | Points per game | **Bold** | Career high |
| † | Won an NBA championship |

=== NBA ===
==== Regular season ====
| Year | Team | GP | GS | MPG | FG% | 3P% | FT% | RPG | APG | SPG | BPG | PPG |
|---|---|---|---|---|---|---|---|---|---|---|---|---|
| 2012–13 | Cleveland | 61 | **48** | 28.8 | .412 | .310 | .746 | 2.4 | 3.0 | 1.0 | .3 | 14.7 |
| 2013–14 | Cleveland | 70 | 24 | 29.6 | **.433** | .368 | .685 | 2.8 | 3.0 | .9 | .2 | **15.9** |
| 2014–15 | Cleveland | 33 | 3 | 23.8 | .404 | .256 | .783 | 1.7 | 2.2 | **1.3** | .3 | 10.5 |
| 2014–15 | Oklahoma City | 47 | 20 | 30.3 | .392 | .319 | .625 | 2.9 | 1.9 | 1.0 | .2 | 12.7 |
| 2015–16 | Oklahoma City | **78** | 15 | 27.6 | .399 | .358 | .713 | 2.6 | 2.0 | 1.0 | .2 | 9.8 |
| 2016–17 | Miami | 46 | 43 | 30.1 | .423 | .395 | .646 | 3.3 | **4.3** | .9 | .4 | 15.8 |
| 2017–18 | Miami | 30 | 30 | **30.6** | .398 | .306 | .739 | 2.6 | 3.8 | .8 | .3 | 14.3 |
| 2018–19 | Miami | 44 | 28 | 25.9 | .414 | .377 | .500 | 2.6 | 2.8 | .7 | .2 | 12.0 |
| 2019–20 | Miami | 3 | 0 | 14.0 | .385 | **.471** | .000 | **3.7** | 1.0 | .0 | **.7** | 9.3 |
| 2019–20† | L.A. Lakers | 7 | 0 | 23.6 | .425 | .233 | **.875** | 1.9 | 2.4 | .6 | .6 | 11.9 |
| Career | | 419 | 211 | 28.2 | .412 | .346 | .694 | 2.6 | 2.8 | .9 | .3 | 13.1 |

==== Playoffs ====
| Year | Team | GP | GS | MPG | FG% | 3P% | FT% | RPG | APG | SPG | BPG | PPG |
|---|---|---|---|---|---|---|---|---|---|---|---|---|
| 2016 | Oklahoma City | **18** | 0 | **27.3** | **.417** | **.375** | .667 | **2.6** | **2.3** | **.6** | **.2** | **8.4** |
| 2020† | L.A. Lakers | 5 | 0 | 7.6 | .333 | .000 | **1.000** | .4 | .4 | .2 | **.2** | 2.0 |
| Career | | 23 | 0 | 23.0 | .410 | .350 | .688 | 2.1 | 1.9 | .5 | .2 | 7.0 |

=== College ===
| Year | Team | GP | GS | MPG | FG% | 3P% | FT% | RPG | APG | SPG | BPG | PPG |
|---|---|---|---|---|---|---|---|---|---|---|---|---|
| 2010–11 | Syracuse | 34 | 0 | 16.3 | .411 | .329 | **.813** | 1.6 | 1.5 | 1.1 | .1 | 6.6 |
| 2011–12 | Syracuse | **37** | 0 | **24.1** | **.476** | **.363** | .729 | **2.3** | **2.5** | **1.8** | **.3** | **12.6** |
| Career | | 71 | 0 | 20.4 | .453 | .348 | .753 | 1.9 | 2.0 | 1.5 | .2 | 9.7 |

== Awards ==
- Second-team Parade All-American (2010)
- Jordan Brand All-American (2010)
- Big East Sixth Man of the Year (2012)
- Third-team All-Big East (2012)
- Big East All-Tournament Team (2012)
- NBA Eastern Conference Rookie of the Month (February 2013)
- NBA All-Rookie First Team (2013)
- 2× NBA Rising Star (2013, 2014)
- NBA Eastern Conference Player of the Week (January 23–29, 2017)
- NBA Champion (2020)

== See also ==
- List of people banned or suspended by the NBA
