= 2013–14 Cleveland Cavaliers season =

NBA professional basketball team season

- Head coach: Mike Brown
- General manager: Chris Grant (fired); David Griffin
- Owner: Dan Gilbert
- Arena: Quicken Loans Arena

Results
- Record: 33–49 (.402)
- Place: Division: 3rd (Central); Conference: 10th (Eastern)
- Playoff finish: Did not qualify
- Stats at Basketball Reference

Local media
- Television: Fox Sports Ohio; WUAB
- Radio: WTAM

The 2013–14 Cleveland Cavaliers season was the 44th season of the franchise in the National Basketball Association (NBA). It would be the team's last losing record until the 2018–2019 season and the team's last season before re-signing LeBron James. After finishing the previous season with the third-worst record, the Cavaliers held the first overall pick for the second time in four seasons and used it to select Anthony Bennett.

== Key dates ==
- April 18, 2013 – Fired head coach Byron Scott.
- April 24 – Hired Mike Brown as head coach.
- June 27 – The 2013 NBA draft took place in Brooklyn, New York, at the Barclays Center.
- July 12 – Signed Jarrett Jack and Earl Clark.
- July 19 – Signed Andrew Bynum; waived Kevin Jones and Chris Quinn.
- August 1 – Signed Carrick Felix.
- August 2 – Signed Sergey Karasev.
- August 20 – Signed Anthony Bennett.
- September 13 – Signed Matthew Dellavedova.
- September 30 – Signed Jermaine Taylor, Kenny Kadji, Henry Sims, Michael Lee, Elliot Williams and DeSagana Diop.
- October 19 – Waived Michael Lee.
- October 23 – Exercised third-year options on Dion Waiters and Tyler Zeller; exercised fourth-year options on Kyrie Irving and Tristan Thompson.
- October 25 – Waived Jermaine Taylor, Kenny Kadji, Elliot Williams and DeSagana Diop.
- December 5 – Assigned Henry Sims and Carrick Felix to the Canton Charge of the NBA D-League.
- December 9 – Recalled Henry Sims and Carrick Felix from the Canton Charge.
- December 11 – Assigned Henry Sims, Sergey Karasev and Carrick Felix to the Canton Charge.
- December 12 – Recalled Henry Sims, Sergey Karasev and Carrick Felix from the Canton Charge.
- December 27 – Assigned Sergey Karasev to the Canton Charge.
- December 28 – Suspended Andrew Bynum indefinitely for conduct detrimental to the team.
- December 30 – Recalled Sergey Karasev from the Canton Charge.
- January 6, 2014 – Acquired Luol Deng from the Chicago Bulls in exchange for Andrew Bynum, three future draft picks and the right to swap 2015 first round picks (1–14 protected).
- January 15 – Assigned Carrick Felix to the Canton Charge.
- January 21 – Recalled Carrick Felix from the Canton Charge.
- January 22 – Assigned Sergey Karasev and Carrick Felix to the Canton Charge.
- January 26 – Recalled Sergey Karasev and Carrick Felix from the Canton Charge.
- January 29 – Dion Waiters selected to play in the 2014 NBA Rising Stars Challenge; Assigned Sergey Karasev to the Canton Charge.
- February 6 – Fired general manager Chris Grant and named David Griffin their new general manager; Kyrie Irving selected to participate in the 2014 NBA All-Star Weekend Three-Point Shootout.
- February 12 – Recalled Sergey Karasev from the Canton Charge.
- February 18 – Assigned Sergey Karasev to the Canton Charge.
- February 19 – Recalled Sergey Karasev from the Canton Charge.
- February 20 –Acquired Spencer Hawes from the Philadelphia 76ers in exchange for Henry Sims, Earl Clark and two future second round draft picks.
- February 22 –Signed Arinze Onuaku to 10-day contract.
- March 3 –Signed Arinze Onuaku to second 10-day contract.
- March 5 – Assigned Sergey Karasev to the Canton Charge.
- March 11 – Retired Zydrunas Ilgauskas's jersey (#11);. Recalled Sergey Karasev to the Canton Charge.
- March 11 – Assigned Sergey Karasev to the Canton Charge.
- March 12 – Arinze Onuaku's contract expired; Signed Shane Edwards to 10-day contract.
- March 18 – Recalled Sergey Karasev from the Canton Charge.
- March 21 – Shane Edwards' 10-day contract expired; Signed Seth Curry to 10-day contract.
- March 30 – Seth Curry's 10-day contract expired.
- March 31 – Signed Scotty Hopson to multi-year contract.
- April 6 – Assigned Sergey Karasev and Scotty Hopson to the Canton Charge.
- April 9 – Recalled Sergey Karasev and Scotty Hopson from the Canton Charge.
- April 10 – Assigned Sergey Karasev and Scotty Hopson to the Canton Charge.
- April 12 – Recalled Sergey Karasev from the Canton Charge.
- April 15 – Luol Deng won the J. Walter Kennedy Citizenship Award; Recalled Scotty Hopson from the Canton Charge.

== Draft picks ==
Round	Pick	Player	Position	Nationality	College/Club team
1	1	Anthony Bennett	PF/SF	Canada	UNLV
1	19 (from LA Lakers)	Sergey Karasev	SG/SF	Russia	Triumph Lyubertsy
2	31 (from Orlando traded to Portland)	Allen Crabbe	SG	United States	California
2	33	Carrick Felix	SG	United States	Arizona State

== Roster ==
2013–14 Cleveland Cavaliers roster
Players

Pos.	No.	Player	Height	Weight	DOB	From
PF	15	Anthony Bennett	6 ft 8 in (2.03 m)	240 lb (109 kg)	1993-03-14	UNLV
SG	8	Matthew Dellavedova	6 ft 4 in (1.93 m)	200 lb (91 kg)	1990-09-08	St. Mary's (CA)
SF	9	Luol Deng	6 ft 9 in (2.06 m)	220 lb (100 kg)	1985-04-16	Duke
SG	30	Carrick Felix	6 ft 6 in (1.98 m)	201 lb (91 kg)	1990-08-17	Arizona State
SF	33	Alonzo Gee	6 ft 6 in (1.98 m)	225 lb (102 kg)	1987-05-29	Alabama
C	32	Spencer Hawes	7 ft 1 in (2.16 m)	245 lb (111 kg)	1988-04-28	Washington
SG	24	Scotty Hopson	6 ft 7 in (2.01 m)	204 lb (93 kg)	1989-08-08	Tennessee
PG	2	Kyrie Irving	6 ft 3 in (1.91 m)	193 lb (88 kg)	1992-03-23	Duke
PG	1	Jarrett Jack	6 ft 3 in (1.91 m)	200 lb (91 kg)	1983-10-28	Georgia Tech
SF	10	Sergey Karasev	6 ft 7 in (2.01 m)	196 lb (89 kg)	1993-10-26	Russia
SG	0	C. J. Miles	6 ft 6 in (1.98 m)	231 lb (105 kg)	1987-03-18	Skyline HS (TX)
F/C	13	Tristan Thompson	6 ft 9 in (2.06 m)	238 lb (108 kg)	1991-03-13	Texas
C	17	Anderson Varejão	6 ft 11 in (2.11 m)	267 lb (121 kg)	1982-09-28	Brazil
SG	3	Dion Waiters	6 ft 4 in (1.93 m)	225 lb (102 kg)	1991-12-10	Syracuse
C	40	Tyler Zeller	7 ft 0 in (2.13 m)	253 lb (115 kg)	1990-01-17	North Carolina

Coaches
Head coach
- Mike Brown
Assistant(s)
- Bernie Bickerstaff
- Jim Boylan
- Bret Brielmaier
- Igor Kokoškov
- Jamahl Mosley

Legend
- (DP) Unsigned draft pick
- (FA) Free agent
- (S) Suspended
- Injured

Roster
Updated: April 15, 2014

== Pre-season ==
2013 pre-season game log
Total: 4–4 (Home: 3–3; Road: 1–1)
Pre-season: 4–4 (home: 3–3; road: 1–1)

Game	Date	Team	Score	High points	High rebounds	High assists	Location Attendance	Record
1	October 8	Milwaukee	W 99–87	Tristan Thompson (17)	Varejão & Bennett (10)	Jarrett Jack (5)	Quicken Loans Arena; 9,022	1–0
2	October 11	@ Orlando	W 110–105	Dion Waiters (21)	Tristan Thompson (8)	Kyrie Irving (5)	Amway Center; 13,611	2–0
3	October 15	Charlotte	L 74–92	Irving & Miles (15)	Henry Sims (9)	Matthew Dellavedova (7)	Canton Memorial Civic Center; 4,047	2–1
4	October 17	Detroit	W 96–84	Irving & Taylor (15)	Anderson Varejão (11)	Matthew Dellavedova (8)	Quicken Loans Arena; 12,679	3–1
5	October 19	Indiana	L 79–102	Kyrie Irving (15)	Anthony Bennett (10)	Irving & Dellavedova (5)	Quicken Loans Arena; 14,760	3–2
6	October 21	Philadelphia	W 104–93	Kyrie Irving (17)	Tristan Thompson (16)	Kyrie Irving (12)	Schottenstein Center; 11,276	4–2
7	October 23	Washington	L 82–101	Kyrie Irving (19)	Tristan Thompson (14)	Jarrett Jack (5)	U.S. Bank Arena; 7,528	4–3
8	October 24	@ Charlotte	L 92–105	Kyrie Irving (20)	Thompson & Sims (8)	Jarrett Jack (4)	Time Warner Cable Arena; 5,936	4–4

2013–14 season schedule

== Regular season ==
=== Standings ===
Central Division	W	L	PCT	GB	Home	Road	Div	GP
c-Indiana Pacers	56	26	.683	–	35‍–‍6	21‍–‍20	12–4	82
x-Chicago Bulls	48	34	.585	8.0	27‍–‍14	21‍–‍20	11–5	82
Cleveland Cavaliers	33	49	.402	23.0	19‍–‍22	14‍–‍27	7–9	82
Detroit Pistons	29	53	.354	27.0	17‍–‍24	12‍–‍29	6–10	82
Milwaukee Bucks	15	67	.183	41.0	10‍–‍31	5‍–‍36	4–12	82

Eastern Conference
#	Team	W	L	PCT	GB	GP
1	c-Indiana Pacers *	56	26	.683	–	82
2	y-Miami Heat *	54	28	.659	2.0	82
3	y-Toronto Raptors *	48	34	.585	8.0	82
4	x-Chicago Bulls	48	34	.585	8.0	82
5	x-Washington Wizards	44	38	.537	12.0	82
6	x-Brooklyn Nets	44	38	.537	12.0	82
7	x-Charlotte Bobcats	43	39	.524	13.0	82
8	x-Atlanta Hawks	38	44	.463	18.0	82
9	New York Knicks	37	45	.451	19.0	82
10	Cleveland Cavaliers	33	49	.402	23.0	82
11	Detroit Pistons	29	53	.354	27.0	82
12	Boston Celtics	25	57	.305	31.0	82
13	Orlando Magic	23	59	.280	33.0	82
14	Philadelphia 76ers	19	63	.232	37.0	82
15	Milwaukee Bucks	15	67	.183	41.0	82

=== Game log ===
2013–14 game log
Total: 33–49 (Home: 19–22; Road: 14–27)
October: 1–0 (home: 1–0; road: 0–0)

Game	Date	Team	Score	High points	High rebounds	High assists	Location Attendance	Record
1	October 30	Brooklyn	W 98–94	Tristan Thompson (18)	Tristan Thompson (9)	Kyrie Irving (9)	Quicken Loans Arena; 20,562	1–0

November : 4–12 (home: 3–3; road: 1–9)

Game	Date	Team	Score	High points	High rebounds	High assists	Location Attendance	Record
2	November 1	@ Charlotte	L 84–90	C. J. Miles (22)	Tristan Thompson (11)	Kyrie Irving (7)	Time Warner Cable Arena; 18,017	1–1
3	November 2	@ Indiana	L 74–89	Dion Waiters (17)	Earl Clark (7)	Kyrie Irving (5)	Bankers Life Fieldhouse; 16,242	1–2
4	November 4	Minnesota	W 93–92	C. J. Miles (19)	Tristan Thompson (11)	Kyrie Irving (6)	Quicken Loans Arena; 17,892	2–2
5	November 6	@ Milwaukee	L 104–109	Kyrie Irving (29)	Anderson Varejão (8)	Kyrie Irving (8)	BMO Harris Bradley Center; 14,340	2–3
6	November 8	@ Philadelphia	L 79–94	Dion Waiters (18)	Tristan Thompson (16)	Kyrie Irving (9)	Wells Fargo Center; 15,219	2–4
7	November 9	Philadelphia	W 127–125 (2OT)	Kyrie Irving (39)	Thompson & Varejão (10)	Kyrie Irving (12)	Quicken Loans Arena; 20,562	3–4
8	November 11	@ Chicago	L 81–96	Kyrie Irving (16)	Tristan Thompson (13)	Kyrie Irving (4)	United Center; 21,778	3–5
9	November 13	@ Minnesota	L 95–124	Kyrie Irving (20)	Thompson & Zeller (6)	Jarrett Jack (5)	Target Center; 14,978	3–6
10	November 15	Charlotte	L 80–86	Kyrie Irving (18)	Anderson Varejão (13)	Kyrie Irving (10)	Quicken Loans Arena; 18,679	3–7
11	November 16	@ Washington	W 103–96 (OT)	Kyrie Irving (41)	Tristan Thompson (12)	Anderson Varejão (6)	Verizon Center; 18,038	4–7
12	November 20	Washington	L 91–98	Kyrie Irving (28)	Anderson Varejão (11)	Irving & Jack (6)	Quicken Loans Arena; 16,189	4–8
13	November 22	@ New Orleans	L 100–104	Kyrie Irving (22)	Anderson Varejão (9)	Bynum & Jack (4)	New Orleans Arena; 15,186	4–9
14	November 23	@ San Antonio	L 96–126	Andrew Bynum (16)	Tristan Thompson (9)	Jarrett Jack (5)	AT&T Center; 18,581	4–10
15	November 27	Miami	L 84–95	Dion Waiters (24)	Tristan Thompson (11)	Jarrett Jack (6)	Quicken Loans Arena; 20,562	4–11
16	November 29	@ Boston	L 86–103	Dion Waiters (21)	Anderson Varejão (12)	Dion Waiters (6)	TD Garden; 17,685	4–12
17	November 30	Chicago	W 97–93	Waiters & Bynum (20)	Tristan Thompson (14)	Kyrie Irving (6)	Quicken Loans Arena; 17,296	5–12

December : 5–9 (home: 4–4; road: 1–5)

Game	Date	Team	Score	High points	High rebounds	High assists	Location Attendance	Record
18	December 4	Denver	W 98–88	Kyrie Irving (23)	Tristan Thompson (21)	Dion Waiters (6)	Quicken Loans Arena; 14,642	6–12
19	December 6, 2013	@ Atlanta	L 89–108	Dion Waiters (30)	Andrew Bynum (13)	Varejão, Irving & Dellavedova (4)	Philips Arena; 13,282	6–13
20	December 7	L.A. Clippers	W 88–82	Irving & Thompson (20)	Anderson Varejão (17)	Kyrie Irving (6)	Quicken Loans Arena; 16,216	7–13
21	December 10	New York	W 109–94	Kyrie Irving (37)	Tristan Thompson (9)	Kyrie Irving (11)	Quicken Loans Arena; 14,580	8–13
22	December 13	@ Orlando	W 109–100	Kyrie Irving (31)	Anderson Varejão (14)	Jarrett Jack (6)	Amway Center; 16,119	9–13
23	December 14	@ Miami	L 107–114	Kyrie Irving (19)	Anderson Varejão (8)	Varejão & Jack (4)	American Airlines Arena; 19,656	9–14
24	December 17	Portland	L 116–119	Irving & Waiters (25)	Bynum & Varejao (9)	Kyrie Irving (10)	Quicken Loans Arena; 15,689	9–15
25	December 20	Milwaukee	W 114–111 (OT)	Kyrie Irving (39)	Tristan Thompson (15)	Kyrie Irving (6)	Quicken Loans Arena; 19,058	10–15
26	December 21	@ Chicago	L 84–100	Andrew Bynum (19)	Tristan Thompson (7)	Jarrett Jack (6)	United Center; 21,658	10–16
27	December 23	Detroit	L 92–115	Kyrie Irving (21)	Andrew Bynum (7)	Kyrie Irving (7)	Quicken Loans Arena; 19,215	10–17
28	December 26, 2013	Atlanta	L 125–127 (2OT)	Kyrie Irving (40)	Anderson Varejão (17)	Kyrie Irving (9)	Quicken Loans Arena; 18,682	10–18
29	December 28	@ Boston	L 100–103	Kyrie Irving (32)	Tyler Zeller (10)	Jarrett Jack (4)	TD Garden; 18,624	10–19
30	December 29	Golden State	L 104–108 (OT)	Kyrie Irving (27)	Thompson & Varejao (12)	Kyrie Irving (9)	Quicken Loans Arena; 19,384	10–20
31	December 31	@ Indiana	L 76–91	Anderson Varejão (14)	Tristan Thompson (13)	Jarrett Jack (6)	Bankers Life Fieldhouse; 18,165	10–21

January : 6–9 (home: 3–5; road: 3–4)

Game	Date	Team	Score	High points	High rebounds	High assists	Location Attendance	Record
32	January 2	Orlando	W 87–81 (OT)	Anderson Varejão (18)	Anderson Varejão (25)	Jarrett Jack (7)	Quicken Loans Arena; 14,248	11–21
33	January 4	@ Brooklyn	L 82–89	Dion Waiters (26)	Anderson Varejão (12)	Jarrett Jack (7)	Barclays Center; 17,732	11–22
34	January 5	Indiana	L 78–82	C. J. Miles (21)	Anderson Varejão (13)	Dion Waiters (5)	Quicken Loans Arena; 17,502	11–23
35	January 7	Philadelphia	W 111–93	C. J. Miles (34)	Anderson Varejão (14)	Waiters & Irving (8)	Quicken Loans Arena; 13,344	12–23
36	January 10	@ Utah	W 113–102	Kyrie Irving (25)	Tristan Thompson (15)	Kyrie Irving (8)	EnergySolutions Arena; 18,480	13–23
37	January 12	@ Sacramento	L 80–124	C. J. Miles (14)	Anderson Varejão (7)	Anderson Varejão (6)	Sleep Train Arena; 16,072	13–24
38	January 14	@ L.A. Lakers	W 120–118	Luol Deng (27)	Anderson Varejão (18)	Anderson Varejão (6)	Staples Center; 18,997	14–24
39	January 15	@ Portland	L 96–108	Luol Deng (25)	Anderson Varejão (14)	Varejão & Irving (4)	Moda Center; 19,998	14–25
40	January 17	@ Denver	W 117–109	Kyrie Irving (23)	Anderson Varejão (14)	Anderson Varejão (7)	Pepsi Center; 18,486	15–25
41	January 20	Dallas	L 97–102	Kyrie Irving (26)	Anderson Varejão (21)	Kyrie Irving (9)	Quicken Loans Arena; 18,762	15–26
42	January 22	Chicago	L 87–98	Kyrie Irving (26)	Anderson Varejão (11)	three players (5)	Quicken Loans Arena; 16,890	15–27
43	January 24	Milwaukee	W 93–78	Anderson Varejão (16)	Tristan Thompson (10)	Kyrie Irving (10)	Quicken Loans Arena; 17,147	16–27
44	January 26	Phoenix	L 90–99	Kyrie Irving (24)	Tristan Thompson (13)	Kyrie Irving (9)	Quicken Loans Arena; 15,872	16–28
45	January 28	New Orleans	L 89–100	Kyrie Irving (23)	Tyler Zeller (10)	Kyrie Irving (5)	Quicken Loans Arena; 13,985	16–29
46	January 30	@ New York	L 86–117	Kyrie Irving (24)	Luol Deng (11)	Kyrie Irving (3)	Madison Square Garden; 19,812	16–30

February : 8–6 (home: 4–3; road: 4–3)

Game	Date	Team	Score	High points	High rebounds	High assists	Location Attendance	Record
47	February 1	@ Houston	L 92–106	Luol Deng (24)	Tristan Thompson (7)	Kyrie Irving (7)	Toyota Center; 18,309	16–31
48	February 3	@ Dallas	L 107–124	Kyrie Irving (27)	Deng & Thompson (8)	Irving & Jack (8)	American Airlines Center; 19,595	16–32
49	February 5	L.A. Lakers	L 108–119	C.J Miles (27)	Anderson Varejão (13)	Varejão & Dellavedova (5)	Quicken Loans Arena; 15,205	16–33
50	February 7	@ Washington	W 115–113	Dion Waiters (24)	Tristan Thompson (8)	Kyrie Irving (12)	Verizon Center; 16,294	17–33
51	February 9	Memphis	W 91–83 (OT)	Kyrie Irving (28)	Anderson Varejão (14)	Irving & Waiters (6)	Quicken Loans Arena; 16,484	18–33
52	February 11	Sacramento	W 109–99	Luol Deng (22)	Tristan Thompson (13)	Dion Waiters (8)	Quicken Loans Arena; 14,245	19–33
53	February 12	@ Detroit	W 93–89	Tristan Thompson (25)	Tristan Thompson (13)	Jarrett Jack (8)	Palace of Auburn Hills; 13,184	20–33
All-Star Break
54	February 18	@ Philadelphia	W 114–85	Tyler Zeller (18)	Tyler Zeller (15)	Jarrett Jack (7)	Wells Fargo Center; 12,904	21–33
55	February 19	Orlando	W 101–93	Kyrie Irving (22)	Tristan Thompson (14)	Kyrie Irving (7)	Quicken Loans Arena; 16,539	22–33
56	February 21	@ Toronto	L 91–98	Luol Deng (21)	Luol Deng (11)	Kyrie Irving (9)	Air Canada Centre; 18,854	22–34
57	February 23	Washington	L 83–96	Luol Deng (17)	Thompson & Hawes (12)	Kyrie Irving (5)	Quicken Loans Arena; 17,238	22–35
58	February 25	Toronto	L 93–99	Kyrie Irving (25)	Luol Deng (9)	Kyrie Irving (9)	Quicken Loans Arena; 13,758	22–36
59	February 26	@ Oklahoma City	W 114–104	Kyrie Irving (31)	Tristan Thompson (11)	Kyrie Irving (9)	Chesapeake Energy Arena; 18,203	23–36
60	February 28	Utah	W 99–79	Kyrie Irving (21)	Spencer Hawes (16)	Kyrie Irving (12)	Quicken Loans Arena; 18,601	24–36

March : 6–9 (home: 2–5; road: 4–4)

Game	Date	Team	Score	High points	High rebounds	High assists	Location Attendance	Record
61	March 1	@ Memphis	L 96–110	Kyrie Irving (28)	Tristan Thompson (8)	Jarrett Jack (5)	FedExForum; 17,011	24–37
62	March 4	San Antonio	L 101–122	Irving & Waiters (24)	Spencer Hawes (13)	Matthew Dellavedova (7)	Quicken Loans Arena; 17,966	24–38
63	March 7	@ Charlotte	L 92–101	Deng & Waiters (19)	Spencer Hawes (7)	Jarrett Jack (6)	Time Warner Cable Arena; 15,688	24–39
64	March 8	New York	L 97–107	Kyrie Irving (30)	Spencer Hawes (9)	Kyrie Irving (8)	Quicken Loans Arena; 20,562	24–40
65	March 12	@ Phoenix	W 110–101	Kyrie Irving (23)	Deng & Irving (9)	Kyrie Irving (6)	US Airways Center; 17,902	25–40
66	March 14	@ Golden State	W 103–94	Spencer Hawes (22)	Spencer Hawes (13)	Jack, Irving & Waiters (4)	Oracle Arena; 19,596	26–40
67	March 16	@ L.A. Clippers	L 80–102	Luol Deng (23)	Anderson Varejão (12)	Jack & Waiters (5)	Staples Center; 19,274	26–41
68	March 18	Miami	L 96–100	Jarrett Jack (22)	Anderson Varejão (11)	Dion Waiters (11)	Quicken Loans Arena; 20,562	26–42
69	March 20	Oklahoma City	L 95–102	Dion Waiters (30)	Tristan Thompson (10)	Matthew Dellavedova (10)	Quicken Loans Arena; 18,246	26–43
70	March 22	Houston	L 111–118	Dion Waiters (26)	Tristan Thompson (12)	Matthew Dellavedova (10)	Quicken Loans Arena; 19,058	26–44
71	March 23	@ New York	W 106–100	Jarrett Jack (31)	Hawes, Jack & Waiters (5)	Jarrett Jack (10)	Madison Square Garden; 19,812	27–44
72	March 25	Toronto	W 102–100	Dion Waiters (24)	Tristan Thompson (13)	Deng & Waiters (7)	Quicken Loans Arena; 15,497	28–44
73	March 26	@ Detroit	W 97–96	Matthew Dellavedova (21)	Anderson Varejão (16)	Matthew Dellavedova (6)	Palace of Auburn Hills; 15,979	29–44
74	March 28	@ Brooklyn	L 97–108	Deng & Waiters (20)	Anderson Varejão (13)	Deng & Jack (7)	Barclays Center; 17,732	29–45
75	March 30	Indiana	W 90–76	Dion Waiters (19)	Tristan Thompson (16)	Jarrett Jack (9)	Quicken Loans Arena; 17,147	30–45

April : 3–4 (home: 2–2; road: 1–2)

Game	Date	Team	Score	High points	High rebounds	High assists	Location Attendance	Record
76	April 2	@ Orlando	W 119–98	Dion Waiters (26)	Tristan Thompson (11)	Kyrie Irving (8)	Amway Center; 16,092	31–45
77	April 4, 2014	@ Atlanta	L 98–117	Dion Waiters (23)	Spencer Hawes (10)	Hawes & Irving (4)	Philips Arena; 16,210	31–46
78	April 5	Charlotte	L 94–96 (OT)	Kyrie Irving (44)	Tristan Thompson (12)	Kyrie Irving (8)	Quicken Loans Arena; 18,179	31–47
79	April 9	Detroit	W 122–100	Dion Waiters (22)	Anderson Varejão (12)	Matthew Dellavedova (10)	Quicken Loans Arena; 15,979	32–47
80	April 11	@ Milwaukee	L 116–119	Dion Waiters (23)	Tristan Thompson (10)	Dellavedova & Waiters (4)	BMO Harris Bradley Center; 13,126	32–48
81	April 12	Boston	L 99–111	Irving, Jack & Waiters (15)	Thompson & Hawes (10)	Jarrett Jack (6)	Quicken Loans Arena; 18,456	32–49
82	April 16	Brooklyn	W 114–85	Tyler Zeller (22)	Tyler Zeller (11)	Jarrett Jack (9)	Quicken Loans Arena; 19,842	33–49

2013–14 season schedule

== Player statistics ==
Legend
GP	Games played	GS	Games started	MPG	Minutes per game
FG%	Field-goal percentage	3P%	3-point field-goal percentage	FT%	Free-throw percentage
RPG	Rebounds per game	APG	Assists per game	SPG	Steals per game
BPG	Blocks per game	PPG	Points per game

=== Regular season ===
Player	GP	GS	MPG	FG%	3P%	FT%	RPG	APG	SPG	BPG	PPG
Kyrie Irving	71	71	35.2	.430	.358	.861	3.6	6.1	1.5	.3	20.8
Dion Waiters	70	24	29.6	.433	.368	.685	2.8	3.0	.9	.2	15.9
Luol Deng	40	40	33.8	.417	.315	.771	5.1	2.5	1.0	.1	14.3
Spencer Hawes	27	25	32.9	.468	.448	.784	7.7	2.4	.5	1.0	13.5
Tristan Thompson	82	82	31.6	.477	.000	.693	9.2	.9	.5	.4	11.7
C.J Miles	51	34	19.3	.435	.393	.853	2.0	1.0	.9	.3	9.9
Jarrett Jack	80	31	28.2	.410	.341	.839	2.8	4.1	.7	.3	9.5
Anderson Varejao	65	29	27.7	.495	.000	.681	9.7	2.2	1.1	.6	8.4
Andrew Bynum	24	19	20.0	.419	.000	.762	5.3	1.1	.3	1.2	8.4
Tyler Zeller	70	9	15.0	.538	.000	.719	4.0	.5	.3	.5	5.7
Earl Clark	44	17	15.5	.375	.345	.583	2.8	.4	.4	.4	5.2
Matthew Dellavedova	72	4	17.7	.412	.368	.792	1.7	2.6	.5	.1	4.7
Anthony Bennett	52	0	12.8	.356	.245	.638	3.0	.3	.4	.2	4.2
Alonzo Gee	65	24	15.7	.415	.328	.705	2.3	.7	.6	.2	4.0
Seth Curry	1	0	9.0	.333	1.000	.000	1.0	.0	2.0	.0	3.0
Carrick Felix	7	0	5.4	.500	.400	.750	.9	.6	.0	.0	2.7
Henry Sims	20	0	8.4	.400	.000	.571	2.8	.3	.3	.4	2.2
Sergey Karasev	20	1	7.1	.343	.211	.900	.7	.3	.1	.0	1.7
Shane Edwards	2	0	6.0	.343	.000	.000	1.0	.0	.0	.0	1.0
Scotty Hopson	2	0	3.5	.000	.000	.500	.0	.5	.5	.0	.5
Arinze Onuaku	2	0	2.5	.000	.000	.000	.5	.0	.0	.0	.0

Through April 16, 2014

== Awards, records and milestones ==
=== Awards ===
==== Week/Month ====
- December 16, 2013- Kyrie Irving won the Eastern Conference Player of the Week.

==== All-Star ====
- January 23, 2014- Kyrie Irving named Eastern Conference All-Star starter.
- February 16, 2014- Kyrie Irving is named the MVP of the 2014 NBA All-Star Game.

=== Records ===
- October 30, 2013- Anderson Varejão passed Jim Brewer for 7th all-time in rebounds as a Cavalier.
- November 2, 2013- Anderson Varejão passed Larry Nance for 6th all-time in rebounds as a Cavalier.
- November 6, 2013- Anderson Varejão passed Terrell Brandon for 13th all-time in minutes played as a Cavalier.
- December 4, 2013- Anderson Varejão passed Jim Brewer for 12th all-time in minutes played as a Cavalier.
- December 7, 2013- Kyrie Irving passed Antawn Jamison for 15th all-time in three-point field goals made played as a Cavalier.
- December 10, 2013- Kyrie Irving passed Lamond Murray for 14th all-time in three-point field goals made played as a Cavalier.
- December 14, 2013- Anderson Varejão passed Jim Brewer for 8th all-time in blocked shots as a Cavalier.
- December 26, 2013- Kyrie Irving passed Bob Sura for 13th all-time in three-point field goals made played as a Cavalier.
- December 28, 2013- Anderson Varejão passed Jim Chones for 5th all-time in rebounds as a Cavalier.
- December 28, 2013- Kyrie Irving passed Donyell Marshall for 12th all-time in three-point field goals made played as a Cavalier.
- January 2, 2014- Anderson Varejão grabbed 25 rebounds against the Orlando Magic to tie a team record set by Rick Roberson on March 4, 1972.
- January 5, 2014- Anderson Varejão passed LeBron James for 4th all-time in rebounds as a Cavalier.
- January 5, 2014- C. J. Miles made a team record 10 three-pointers against the Philadelphia 76ers.
- January 14, 2014- Kyrie Irving passed Anthony Parker for 11th all-time in three-point field goals made played as a Cavalier.
- January 20, 2014- Anderson Varejão passed John Bagley for 8th all-time in steals as a Cavalier.
- January 24, 2014- Anderson Varejão passed Jim Chones for 11th all-time in minutes played as a Cavalier.
- February 3, 2014- Anderson Varejão passed Craig Ehlo for 9th all-time in games played as a Cavalier;Kyrie Irving passed Terrell Brandon for 10th all-time in three-point field goals made played as a Cavalier.
- April 16, 2014- Mike Brown passed Bill Fitch for 2nd all-time in coaching wins as a Cavalier.

=== Team records ===
- November 4, 2013- Tied team record for longest streak of holding opponents under 95 points to start a season- 4 games.
- January 2, 2014- The Cavs played in their third overtime game in a row at home for the first time in team history.
- February 5, 2014- Set a Quicken Loans Arena record with 27 offensive rebounds against the Los Angeles Lakers.
- April 5, 2014- In a loss to the Charlotte Hornets the Cavs tied a team record with their eighth overtime game in a season.

=== Milestones ===
- October 30, 2013- C. J. Miles scored his 4,000th career point.
- November 2, 2013- Earl Clark played in his 200th career game.
- November 4, 2013- C. J. Miles made his 1,500th career field goal.
- November 8, 2013- Jarrett Jack made his 1,500th career free throw.
- November 9, 2013- Jarrett Jack became the first reserve player since Tom Gugliotta in 1995 to put up 20 points, four rebounds, five assists, three steals and three blocks in a game.
- November 11, 2013- Dion Waiters scored his 1,000th career point.
- November 16, 2013- Kyrie Irving made his 200th career three-point field goal.
- November 20, 2013- Andrew Bynum played in his 400th career game.
- November 22, 2013- Alonzo Gee recorded in his 250th career steal.
- December 13, 2013- Kyrie Irving made his 1,000th career field goal.
- December 14, 2013- Alonzo Gee scored in his 2,000th career point.
- December 17, 2013- Jarrett Jack scored his 7,000th career point.
- December 21, 2013- Jarrett Jack made his 2,500th career field goal.
- December 23, 2013- Earl Clark scored his 1,000th career point.
- December 26, 2013- Anderson Varejão made his 1,500th career field goal.
- December 28, 2013- Jarrett Jack recorded in his 500th career steal.
- December 31, 2013- Anderson Varejão played in his 500th career game.
- January 4, 2014- C. J. Miles made his 500th career three-point field goal.
- January 10, 2014- Kyrie Irving scored his 3,000th career point.
- January 14, 2013- Luol Deng made his 4,000th career field goal.
- January 30, 2014- Jarrett Jack made his 500th career three-point field goal; Tristan Thompson scored his 2,000th career point.
- February 1, 2014- Luol Deng made his 400th career three-point field goal.
- February 3, 2014- Anderson Varejão became fourth player to record 4,000 points and 4,000 rebounds as a Cavalier and he achieved both milestones on the same night.
- February 7, 2014- C. J. Miles played in his 500th career game.
- February 21, 2014- Spencer Hawes grabbed his 3,000th career rebound in his first game as a Cavalier.
- February 26, 2014- Spencer Hawes made his 200th career three-point field goal.
- March 7, 2014- Kyrie Irving recorded his 1,000th career assist.
- March 8, 2014- Spencer Hawes made his 500th career free throw.
- March 25, 2014- Mike Brown became the third coach to pick up his 300th win as a Cavalier.
- April 2, 2014- Spencer Hawes made his 2,000th career field goal; Tristan Thompson made his 500th career free throw.
- April 12, 2014- Alonzo Gee grabbed his 1,000th career rebound.
- April 16, 2014- Kyrie Irving recorded his 250th career steal; Spencer Hawes played in his 500th career game. Dion Waiters scored his 2,000th career point;Tyler Zeller scored his 1,000th career point.

=== Team milestones ===
- November 4, 2013- Team had at least 12 blocks and 10 steals in a game for the first time since March 16, 2004 (Chicago Bulls).
- November 11, 2013- Team had back-to-back games of at least 10 blocks for the first time since December 6, 2008.
- December 7, 2013- Held the Los Angeles Clippers to .322 shooting, the lowest percentage against the Cavs since November 18, 2003 (also against the Clippers).
- December 20, 2013- Scored 107 points for the fifth straight game, the most in a row since December 28, 1993.

== Injuries, surgeries and absences ==
- Carrick Felix missed the first nine games of the season due to a sports hernia.
- Andrew Bynum did not play in the second game of back-to-backs due to a knee injury at the beginning of the season; missed two games in November for personal reasons.
- Dion Waiters missed two games in mid-November due to illness.
- C. J. Miles missed four games in late-November due to a right calf strain.
- Tyler Zeller missed two games in late-November due to a right ankle sprain.
- Carrick Felix missed two games in mid-December due to right knee soreness.
- Anthony Bennett missed two games in mid-December due to illness.
- Dion Waiters missed three games in late-December due to right wrist tendinitis.
- Kyrie Irving missed three games in early January due to a left knee contusion.
- Jarrett Jack missed two games in mid-January due to lower back spasms.
- In late January it was announced that Carrick Felix would miss six to eight weeks with a stress fracture of the left knee (missed 37 games).
- Anderson Varejão missed three games in late-January/early-February with a knee bruise.
- Anderson Varejão missed 12 games in mid-February/early-March with a sore back
- Dion Waiters missed seven games in mid-February/early-March due to a hyperextended left knee
- C. J. Miles missed the final 26 games of the season due to a left ankle sprain.
- Luol Deng missed three games in mid-March due to a left ankle sprain.
- Kyrie Irving missed eight games in mid-March until late March due to a left biceps strain.
- Sergey Karasev missed five games in late March due to right knee patellar tendonitis.
- Anthony Bennett missed 17 games from mid-March until mid-April with a left patellar tendon strain.
- Luol Deng missed three games in mid-April due to lower back soreness.

== Transactions ==
=== Preseason ===
==== Overview ====
Players added

Via draft

- Anthony Bennett
- Sergey Karasev
- Carrick Felix

Via free agency

- Andrew Bynum
- Earl Clark
- Matthew Dellavedova
- Jarrett Jack
- Henry Sims
Players lost

Via free agency

- Wayne Ellington
- Shaun Livingston
- Marreese Speights

Waived/Not re-signed

- Daniel Gibson
- Kevin Jones
- Chris Quinn
- Luke Walton

==== Free agents ====
Additions
Player	Former team
Andrew Bynum	Philadelphia 76ers
Earl Clark	Los Angeles Lakers
Matthew Dellavedova	Rookie
Jarrett Jack	Golden State Warriors
Henry Sims	Erie BayHawks

Subtractions
Player	Reason left	New team
Wayne Ellington	Free agency	Dallas Mavericks
Shaun Livingston	Free agency	Brooklyn Nets
Marreese Speights	Free Agency	Golden State Warriors
Daniel Gibson	Not re-signed	
Kevin Jones	Waived	
Chris Quinn	Waived	
Luke Walton	Not re-signed	

=== In season ===
==== Overview ====
Players added

Via trade

- Luol Deng
- Spencer Hawes
Players lost

Via trade

- Andrew Bynum
- Earl Clark
- Henry Sims

==== Trades ====
January 6, 2014	To Cleveland Cavaliers Luol Deng	To Chicago Bulls Andrew Bynum; Draft considerations
February 20, 2014	To Cleveland Cavaliers Spencer Hawes	To Philadelphia 76ers Earl Clark; Henry Sims; Draft considerations
