= Shane Edwards (basketball) =

American basketball player (born 1987)

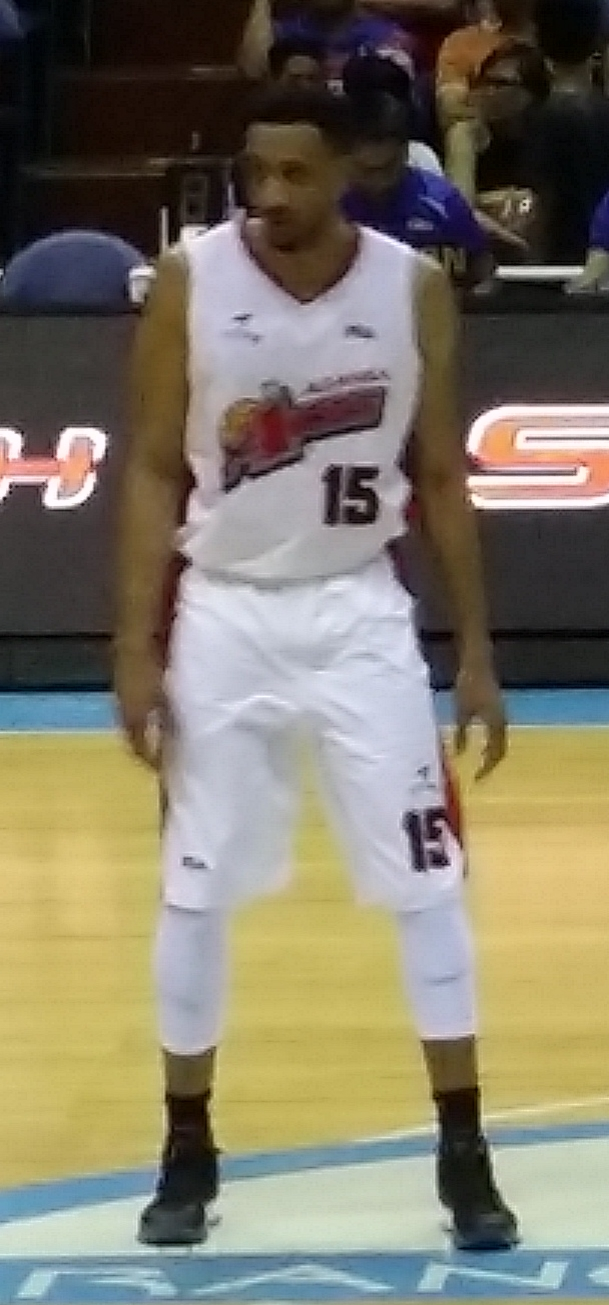
- Edwards during his stint with the Alaska Aces

Personal information
- Born: May 31, 1987 (age 39) Los Angeles, California, U.S.
- Listed height: 6 ft 8 in (2.03 m)
- Listed weight: 220 lb (100 kg)

Career information
- High school: Mountain Pointe (Phoenix, Arizona)
- College: Northeastern JC (2005–2007); Little Rock (2007–2009)
- NBA draft: 2009: undrafted
- Playing career: 2009–2019
- Position: Small forward

Career history
- 2009–2011: Albuquerque/New Mexico Thunderbirds
- 2011: Tezenis Verona
- 2012: Canton Charge
- 2012–2013: Cairns Taipans
- 2013–2014: Canton Charge
- 2014: Cleveland Cavaliers
- 2014–2015: Sundsvall Dragons
- 2015–2016: BG Göttingen
- 2016: Alaska Aces
- 2017: Delaware 87ers
- 2017: Nauticos de Mazatlán
- 2018: CLS Knights Indonesia
- 2018–2019: Kawasaki Brave Thunders

Career highlights
- CIBACOPA All-Star (2017); NBA D-League All-Star (2011); First-team All-Sun Belt (2009)
- Stats at NBA.com
- Stats at Basketball Reference

Shane Edwards (born May 31, 1987) is an American former professional basketball player. He played college basketball for Northeastern JC and Little Rock.

== College career ==
Edwards attended Mountain Pointe High School in Phoenix, Arizona, where he starred at basketball. Following his graduation he played junior college basketball at the Northeastern Junior College before moving to University of Arkansas at Little Rock, where he graduated in 2009.

== Professional career ==
=== 2009–10 season ===
Edwards went undrafted in the 2009 NBA draft. On November 1, 2009, he was acquired by the Albuquerque Thunderbirds. On November 26, 2009, he was waived by the Thunderbirds. On December 16, 2009, he was re-acquired by the Thunderbirds.

=== 2010–11 season ===
In July 2010, Edwards joined the Denver Nuggets for the 2010 NBA Summer League. On September 24, 2010, he signed with the Nuggets. However, he was later waived by the Nuggets on October 11, 2010.

On October 31, 2010, he was acquired by the New Mexico Thunderbirds. On February 3, 2011, he was named to the West All-Star roster for the 2011 NBA D-League All-Star Game.

=== 2011–12 season ===
In July 2011, Edwards signed with Tezenis Verona of the Italian Legadue Basket for the 2011–12 season. In December 2011, he left Verona after just nine games. On March 6, 2012, he was acquired by the Canton Charge. On April 2, 2012, he was waived by the Charge due to injury.

=== 2012–13 season ===
On August 26, 2012, Edwards signed with Cairns Taipans for the 2012–13 NBL season.

=== 2013–14 season ===
In November 2013, Edwards was re-acquired by the Canton Charge. On March 12, 2014, he signed a 10-day contract with the Cleveland Cavaliers. On March 21, 2014, he was released by the Cavaliers, and was immediately re-acquired by the Charge.

=== 2014–15 season ===
In July 2014, Edwards joined the Cleveland Cavaliers for the 2014 NBA Summer League. On September 28, 2014, he signed with Cavaliers. However, he was later waived by the Cavaliers on October 25, 2014.

On November 20, 2014, he signed with Sundsvall Dragons of Sweden for the rest of the 2014–15 season.

=== 2015–16 season ===
On August 21, 2015, Edwards signed a one-year deal with BG Göttingen of the Basketball Bundesliga. On January 11, 2016, he parted ways with Göttingen after averaging 11.7 points per game.

On February 20, 2016, he signed with the Alaska Aces of the Philippine Basketball Association as a temporary replacement import for the injured Robert Dozier.

=== 2016–17 season ===
On March 15, 2017, Edwards was acquired by the Delaware 87ers of the NBA Development League. After a short stint, he was released and acquired by the Nauticos de Mazatlán of the Mexican CIBACOPA.

=== 2017–18 season ===
In January 2018, Edwards signed with the CLS Knights Indonesia of the ASEAN Basketball League.

In March 2018, he signed with the Barangay Ginebra San Miguel of the Philippine Basketball Association as a temporary import for the 2018 PBA Commissioner's Cup. However, he was released in April 2018 before appearing in a regular season game.

== NBA career statistics ==
Legend
GP	Games played	GS	Games started	MPG	Minutes per game
FG%	Field goal percentage	3P%	3-point field goal percentage	FT%	Free throw percentage
RPG	Rebounds per game	APG	Assists per game	SPG	Steals per game
BPG	Blocks per game	PPG	Points per game	**Bold**	Career high

=== Regular season ===
Year	Team	GP	GS	MPG	FG%	3P%	FT%	RPG	APG	SPG	BPG	PPG
2013–14	Cleveland	2	0	6.0	.333	.000	.000	1.0	.0	.0	.0	1.0
Career		2	0	6.0	.333	.000	.000	1.0	.0	.0	.0	1.0
