= Carrick Felix =

American basketball player (born 1990)

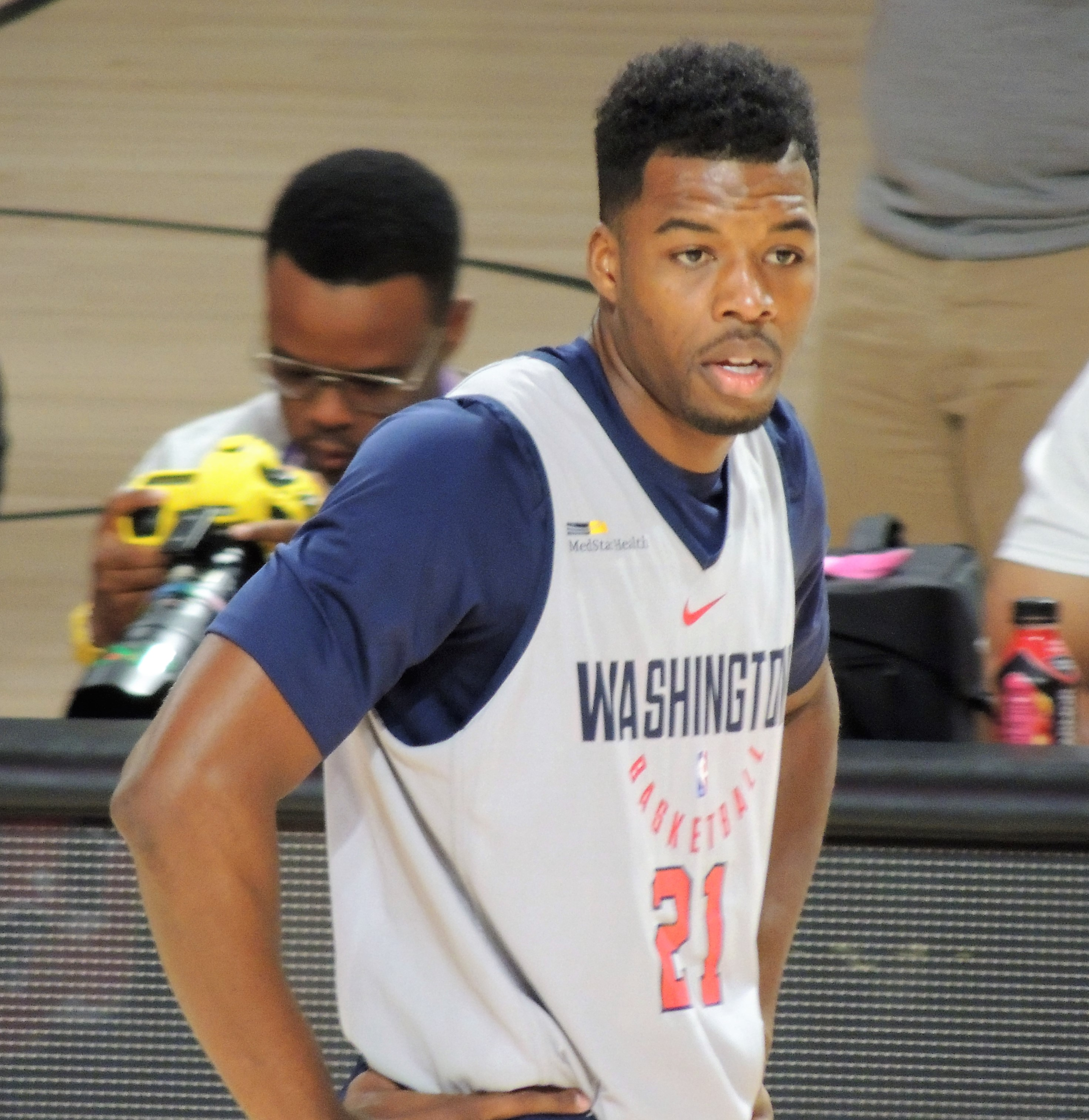
- Felix at Washington Wizards training camp in 2017

Personal information
- Born: August 17, 1990 (age 36) Las Vegas, Nevada, U.S.
- Listed height: 6 ft 6 in (1.98 m)
- Listed weight: 203 lb (92 kg)

Career information
- High school: Millennium (Goodyear, Arizona)
- College: College of Southern Idaho (2009–2010); Arizona State (2010–2013)
- NBA draft: 2013: 2nd round, 33rd overall pick
- Drafted by: Cleveland Cavaliers
- Playing career: 2013–2018
- Position: Shooting guard / small forward
- Number: 30, 0

Career history
- 2013–2014: Cleveland Cavaliers
- 2013–2014: →Canton Charge
- 2014: Santa Cruz Warriors
- 2016–2017: Long Island Nets
- 2017–2018: Melbourne United

Career highlights
- NBL champion (2018); Second-team All-Pac-12 (2013); Pac-12 All-Defensive Team (2013)
- Stats at NBA.com
- Stats at Basketball Reference

Carrick Felix (born August 17, 1990) is an American former professional basketball player. He played three years of college basketball for Arizona State before being drafted by the Cleveland Cavaliers with the 33rd overall pick in the 2013 NBA draft.

== High school career ==
Born in Las Vegas, Nevada, Felix played high school basketball at Millennium High School in Goodyear, Arizona. During his senior season at Millennium, Felix led his team to a state championship and was named MVP of the state championship. As a senior in 2007–08, he averaged 19.7 points, 13.2 rebounds and 1.5 steals per game.

== College career ==
After redshirting the 2008–09 season for medical reasons, Felix averaged 14.8 points and 4.7 rebounds in 2009–10 at College of Southern Idaho. Felix joined the Arizona State Sun Devils for his final three years of eligibility. During his first year at Arizona State, Felix made appearances in 30 of the Sun Devils 31 games, averaging 14.5 minutes and 4.6 points and 1.6 rebounds per game. In his second season, he saw an increase in minutes up from 14.5 the previous season to 32.9 per game. He subsequently averaged 10.5 points and 4.0 rebounds per game. In his third and final year at Arizona State, Felix led the team, as a shooting guard, in rebounds per game with 8.1 and was second on the team in scoring with 14.6 points. He also led the entire Pac-12 with 13 double doubles. He was named second-team All-Pac-12 and Pac-12 All-Defensive Team. He was also named the Pac-12 Scholar Athlete of the Year and earned first-team All-Pac-12 Academic Team honors.

== Professional career ==
Felix was selected with the 33rd overall pick in the 2013 NBA draft by the Cleveland Cavaliers. On August 20, 2013, he signed with the Cavaliers. During his rookie season, he had multiple assignments to the Canton Charge of the NBA Development League.

On July 22, 2014, Felix was traded, along with a 2015 second-round draft pick and cash considerations, to the Utah Jazz in exchange for John Lucas III, Malcolm Thomas and Erik Murphy. On October 27, 2014, he was waived by the Jazz. On November 1, 2014, he was selected by the Santa Cruz Warriors with the fourth overall pick in the 2014 NBA Development League Draft. On December 4, 2014, he was waived by the Warriors after sustaining a left knee injury. Having "broke his left knee in half", Felix needed two surgeries and was told by multiple doctors his sporting career was over. He spent two years away from the game as a result.

On November 1, 2016, Felix was acquired by the Long Island Nets of the NBA Development League.

After spending preseason with the Washington Wizards, Felix signed with Melbourne United on December 22, 2017, as an injury replacement for Casey Prather. Felix was removed from Melbourne's active roster on February 16, 2018, following Prather's return from injury. He remained with the team for their championship run.

In June 2018, Felix re-joined the Wizards for the 2018 NBA Summer League.

== NBA career statistics ==
Legend
GP	Games played	GS	Games started	MPG	Minutes per game
FG%	Field goal percentage	3P%	3-point field goal percentage	FT%	Free throw percentage
RPG	Rebounds per game	APG	Assists per game	SPG	Steals per game
BPG	Blocks per game	PPG	Points per game	**Bold**	Career high

=== Regular season ===
Year	Team	GP	GS	MPG	FG%	3P%	FT%	RPG	APG	SPG	BPG	PPG
2013–14	Cleveland	7	0	5.4	.500	.400	.750	.9	.6	.0	.0	2.7
Career		7	0	5.4	.500	.400	.750	.9	.6	.0	.0	2.7

== Personal ==
In his two years away from the game of basketball between 2014 and 2016, Felix created a mobile app called ZGNIT, which helps holiday makers book adventure equipments such as jet skis.
