= Scotty Hopson =

American basketball player (born 1989)

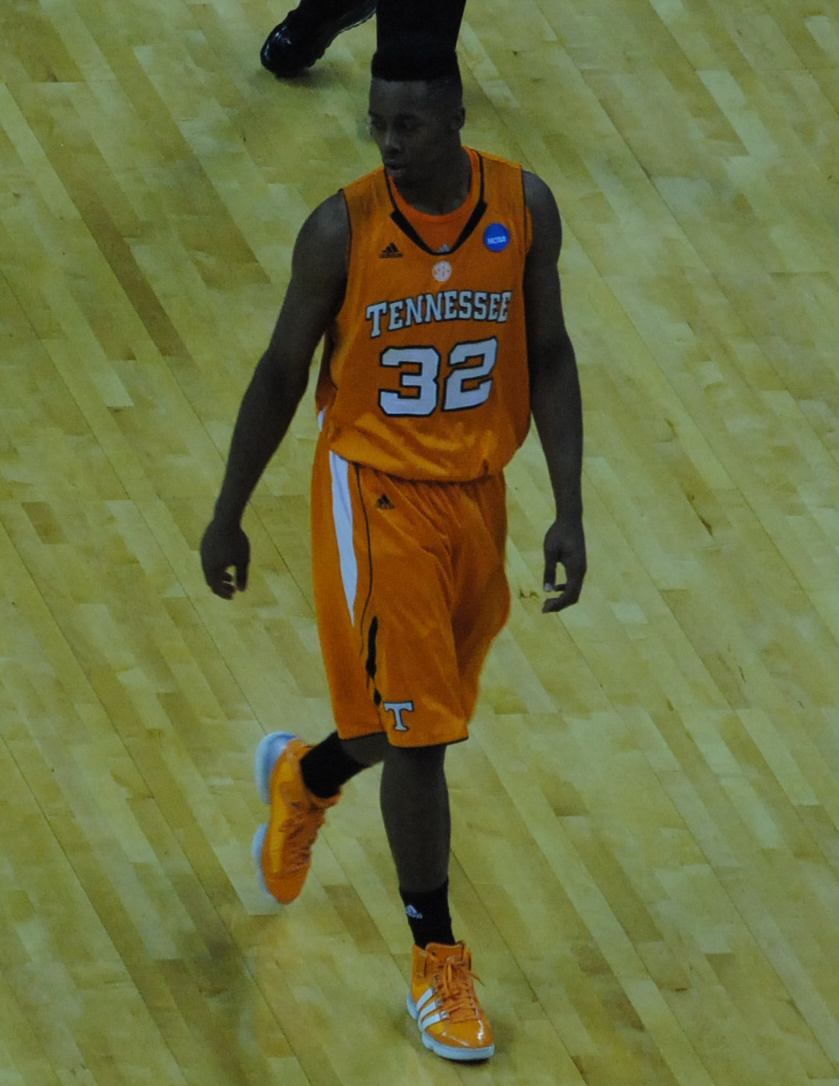
- Hopson with the Tennessee Volunteers in 2011

Free agent
- Position: Shooting guard / small forward

Personal information
- Born: August 8, 1989 (age 36) Hopkinsville, Kentucky, U.S.
- Listed height: 6 ft 7 in (2.01 m)
- Listed weight: 204 lb (93 kg)

Career information
- High school: University Heights Academy (Hopkinsville, Kentucky)
- College: Tennessee (2008–2011)
- NBA draft: 2011: undrafted
- Playing career: 2011–present

Career history
- 2011–2012: Kolossos Rodou
- 2012–2013: Hapoel Eilat
- 2013–2014: Anadolu Efes
- 2014: Cleveland Cavaliers
- 2014: →Canton Charge
- 2014–2015: Sioux Falls Skyforce
- 2015: Laboral Kutxa
- 2015: Foshan Long Lions
- 2016–2017: Cedevita
- 2017: Ironi Nahariya
- 2017–2018: Galatasaray
- 2018: Dallas Mavericks
- 2018–2019: Oklahoma City Blue
- 2019: Hapoel Holon
- 2019–2020: New Zealand Breakers
- 2020: Oklahoma City Blue
- 2020–2021: Melbourne United
- 2021–2022: Oklahoma City Blue
- 2021–2022: Oklahoma City Thunder
- 2022: Dynamo Lebanon
- 2022–2023: Oklahoma City Blue
- 2024: Cleveland Charge
- 2024: Maine Celtics
- 2024: Converge FiberXers

Career highlights
- NBL champion (2021); All-NBL Second Team (2020); First-team All-SEC (2011); Second-team Parade All-American (2008); McDonald's All-American (2008)
- Stats at NBA.com
- Stats at Basketball Reference

Brian Scott Hopson (born August 8, 1989) is an American professional basketball player who last played for the Converge FiberXers of the Philippine Basketball Association (PBA). He played college basketball for the Tennessee Volunteers.

== High school and college career ==
Considered a five-star recruit by the Rivals.com recruiting network, Hopson was listed as the No. 2 shooting guard and the No. 5 player in the nation in 2008. He played three seasons of college basketball for the University of Tennessee under head coach Bruce Pearl from 2008 to 2011.

== Professional career ==
=== Kolossos Rodou (2011–2012) ===
Hopson went undrafted in the 2011 NBA draft. In August 2011, he signed with Kolossos Rodou of the Greek Basket League for the 2011–12 season.

=== Hapoel Eliat (2012–2013) ===
In July 2012, Hopson signed with Hapoel Eilat of the Israeli Basketball Super League for the 2012–13 season. In 33 games, he averaged 17.7 points and 5.2 rebounds per game.

=== Anadolu Efes (2013–2014) ===
In July 2013, Hopson signed with Anadolu Efes of the Turkish Basketball League for the 2013–14 season. His final game for Anadolu Efes came on January 13, 2014.

=== Cleveland Cavaliers (2014) ===
On March 31, 2014, Hopson signed with the Cleveland Cavaliers. He had two assignments with the Canton Charge of the NBA Development League during April 2014.

On July 12, 2014, Hopson was traded, along with cash considerations, to the Charlotte Hornets in exchange for Brendan Haywood and the draft rights to Dwight Powell. The next day, the Hornets traded him to the New Orleans Pelicans in exchange for cash considerations. Two days later, he was traded again, this time to the Houston Rockets. On September 17, 2014, he was traded, along with Alonzo Gee, to the Sacramento Kings in exchange for Jason Terry and two future second-round draft picks. On September 24, 2014, he was waived by the Kings.

=== Sioux Falls Skyforce (2014–2015) ===
On December 7, 2014, Hopson was acquired by the Sioux Falls Skyforce of the NBA Development League. On February 24, 2015, Hopson set two Skyforce single-game records, scoring 52 points and making 21 field goals in a win over the Reno Bighorns.

=== Laboral Kutxa (2015) ===
On April 21, 2015, Hopson signed with Laboral Kutxa of Spain for the rest of the 2014–15 ACB season.

=== Foshan Long Lions (2015) ===
In September 2015, Hopson signed with the Foshan Long Lions of China for the 2015–16 CBA season. He played seven games for Foshan in November 2015, before leaving the team.

=== Cedevita (2016–2017) ===
On July 24, 2016, Hopson signed with Croatian club Cedevita Zagreb.

=== Ironi Nahariya (2017) ===
On February 11, 2017, Hopson signed with Israeli club Ironi Nahariya for the rest of the 2016–17 season.

=== Galatasaray (2017–2018) ===
On July 20, 2017, Hopson signed with Turkish club Galatasaray for the 2017–18 season. He left Galatasaray in January 2018.

=== Dallas Mavericks (2018) ===
On February 26, 2018, Hopson signed a 10-day contract with the Dallas Mavericks. After appearing in one game, he was not offered a second 10-day contract.

=== Oklahoma City Blue (2018–2019) ===
On October 10, 2018, Hopson signed with the Oklahoma City Thunder. He was waived two days later and subsequently joined the Thunder's NBA G League affiliate, the Oklahoma City Blue. On February 14, 2019, he signed a 10-day contract with the Thunder. He did not appear in a game for the Thunder during his stint and returned to the Blue after the contract expired.

=== Hapoel Holon (2019) ===
On April 18, 2019, Hopson returned to Israel for a third stint, signing with Hapoel Holon. He suffered a foot injury in his first game with Holon and was later ruled out for the rest of the season.

=== New Zealand Breakers (2019–2020) ===
On July 31, 2019, Hopson signed with the New Zealand Breakers for the 2019–20 NBL season. Early in the season, he split a ligament in his knee. He returned to action in December after missing most of November. He was named to the All-NBL Second Team.

=== Return to the Blue (2020) ===
In February 2020, Hopson rejoined the Oklahoma City Blue of the NBA G League.

=== Melbourne United (2020–2021) ===
On November 30, 2020, Hopson signed with Melbourne United for the 2020–21 NBL season. He helped Melbourne win the NBL championship in June 2021.

=== Oklahoma City Thunder / Third stint with the Blue (2021–2022) ===
On October 14, 2021, Hopson signed an Exhibit 10 deal with the Oklahoma City Thunder. He was waived a day later and was acquired by the Oklahoma City Blue on October 26. On December 27, 2021, he signed a 10-day contract with the Thunder. He re-joined the Blue on January 6.

=== Dynamo Lebanon (2022) ===
On April 15, 2022, Hopson signed with Dynamo Lebanon of the Lebanese Basketball League.

=== Fourth stint with the Blue (2022–2023) ===
On November 3, 2022, Hopson was named to the opening night roster for the Oklahoma City Blue.

=== Cleveland Charge (2024) ===
On January 30, 2024, Hopson joined the Cleveland Charge, but waived him on February 8.

=== Maine Celtics (2024) ===
On February 10, 2024, Hopson joined the Maine Celtics.

=== Converge FiberXers (2024) ===
On July 18, 2024, Hopson signed with the Converge FiberXers of the Philippine Basketball Association (PBA) as the team's import for the 2024 PBA Governors' Cup.

== Career statistics ==
Legend
| GP | Games played | GS | Games started | MPG | Minutes per game |
| FG% | Field-goal percentage | 3P% | 3-point field-goal percentage | FT% | Free-throw percentage |
| RPG | Rebounds per game | APG | Assists per game | SPG | Steals per game |
| BPG | Blocks per game | PPG | Points per game | PIR | Performance index rating |
| **Bold** | Career high |

=== NBA ===
==== Regular season ====
| Year | Team | GP | GS | MPG | FG% | 3P% | FT% | RPG | APG | SPG | BPG | PPG |
|---|---|---|---|---|---|---|---|---|---|---|---|---|
| 2013–14 | Cleveland | **2** | 0 | 3.5 | .000 | .000 | .500 | .0 | .5 | **.5** | .0 | .5 |
| 2017–18 | Dallas | 1 | 0 | 8.0 | .000 | – | .500 | .0 | **1.0** | .0 | .0 | 1.0 |
| 2021–22 | Oklahoma City | 1 | 0 | **18.0** | **.500** | .000 | – | **1.0** | **1.0** | .0 | .0 | **4.0** |
| Career | | 4 | 0 | 8.3 | .222 | .000 | .500 | .3 | .8 | .3 | .0 | 1.5 |

=== EuroLeague ===
| Year | Team | GP | GS | MPG | FG% | 3P% | FT% | RPG | APG | SPG | BPG | PPG | PIR |
|---|---|---|---|---|---|---|---|---|---|---|---|---|---|
| 2013–14 | Anadolu Efes | 11 | 10 | 28.5 | .625 | .484 | .735 | 4.2 | 1.1 | 1.1 | .5 | 15.5 | 15.7 |
| Career | | 11 | 10 | 28.5 | .625 | .484 | .735 | 4.2 | 1.1 | 1.1 | .5 | 15.5 | 15.7 |
