= Timofey Mozgov =

Russian basketball player (born 1986)

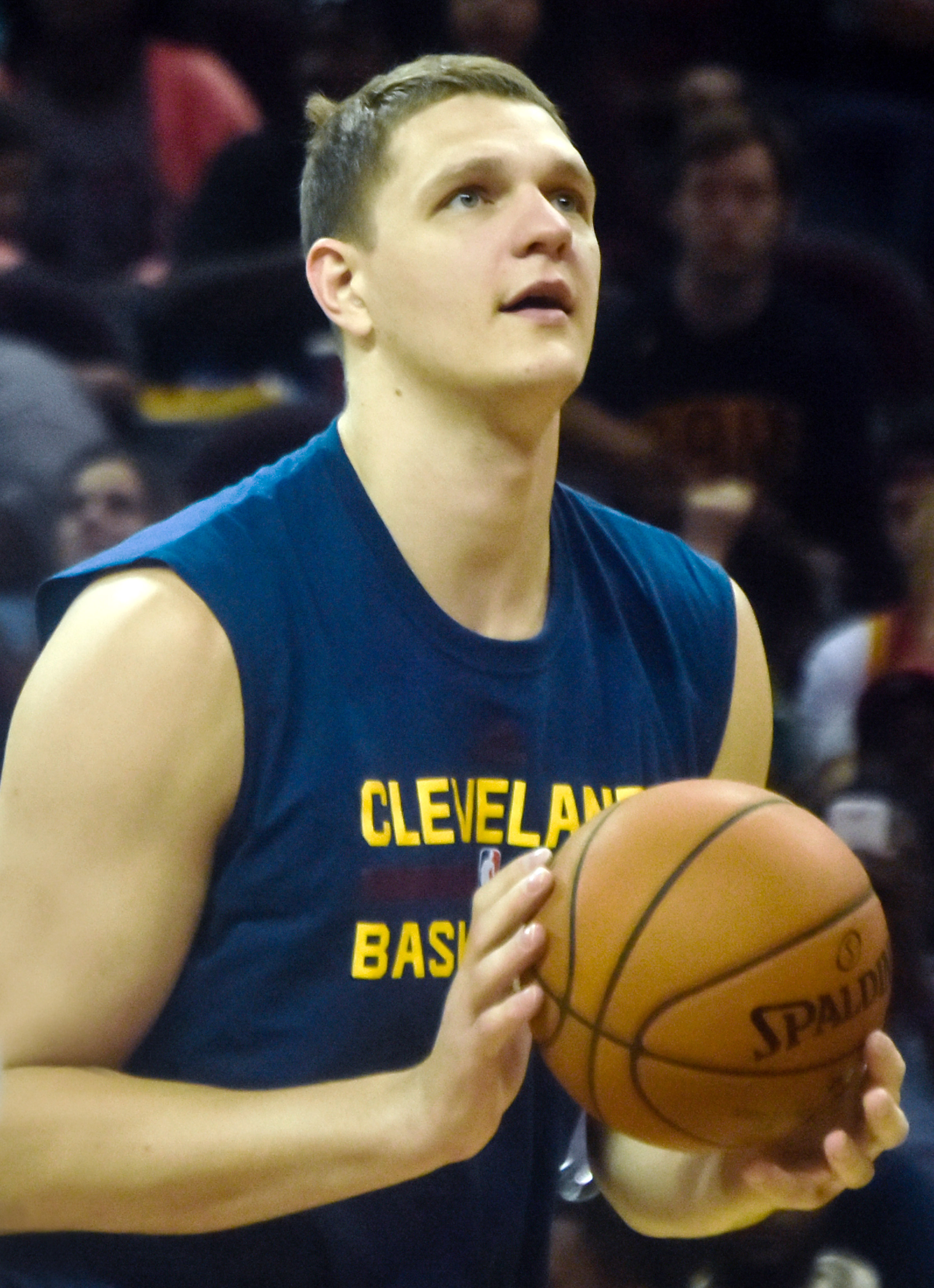
- Mozgov with the Cleveland Cavaliers in 2015

Personal information
- Born: 16 July 1986 (age 40) Leningrad, Russian SFSR, Soviet Union
- Listed height: 7 ft 1 in (2.16 m)
- Listed weight: 275 lb (125 kg)

Career information
- NBA draft: 2008: undrafted
- Playing career: 2004–2022
- Position: Center

Career history
- 2004–2006: LenVo St. Petersburg
- 2006: CSK VVS Samara
- 2006–2010: Khimki
- 2010–2011: New York Knicks
- 2011–2015: Denver Nuggets
- 2011: Khimki
- 2015–2016: Cleveland Cavaliers
- 2016–2017: Los Angeles Lakers
- 2017–2018: Brooklyn Nets
- 2019–2021: Khimki
- 2021–2022: Runa Basket Moscow

Career highlights
- NBA champion (2016); Russian Cup champion (2008)
- Stats at NBA.com
- Stats at Basketball Reference
Medals
Men's basketball
Representing Russia
Olympic Games
Bronze medal – third place	2012 London	Team
EuroBasket
Bronze medal – third place	2011 Lithuania

Timofey Pavlovich Mozgov (Russian: Тимофей Павлович Мозгов, IPA: [tʲɪmɐˈfʲej mɐˈzɡof], born 16 July 1986) is a Russian former professional basketball player. He played eight seasons in the National Basketball Association (NBA) between 2010 and 2018, playing for the New York Knicks, Denver Nuggets, Cleveland Cavaliers, Los Angeles Lakers and Brooklyn Nets. In 2016, he won an NBA championship with the Cavaliers, becoming one of the first Russians to do so, alongside then-teammate Sasha Kaun. He returned to Russia in 2019 and retired from professional basketball in 2022.

As a member of the Russian national team, Mozgov won a bronze medal at both EuroBasket 2011 and the 2012 Summer Olympics.

== Professional career ==
=== LenVo St. Petersburg (2004–2006) ===
Mozgov began his professional career with LenVo St. Petersburg, in the Russian second-tier division, during the 2004–05 season.

=== Samara (2006) ===
In 2006, Mozgov moved to CSK VVS Samara.

=== Khimki (2006–2010) ===
Before the 2006–07 season, Mozgov joined Khimki Moscow Region, where he played through the 2009–10 season.

=== New York Knicks (2010–2011) ===
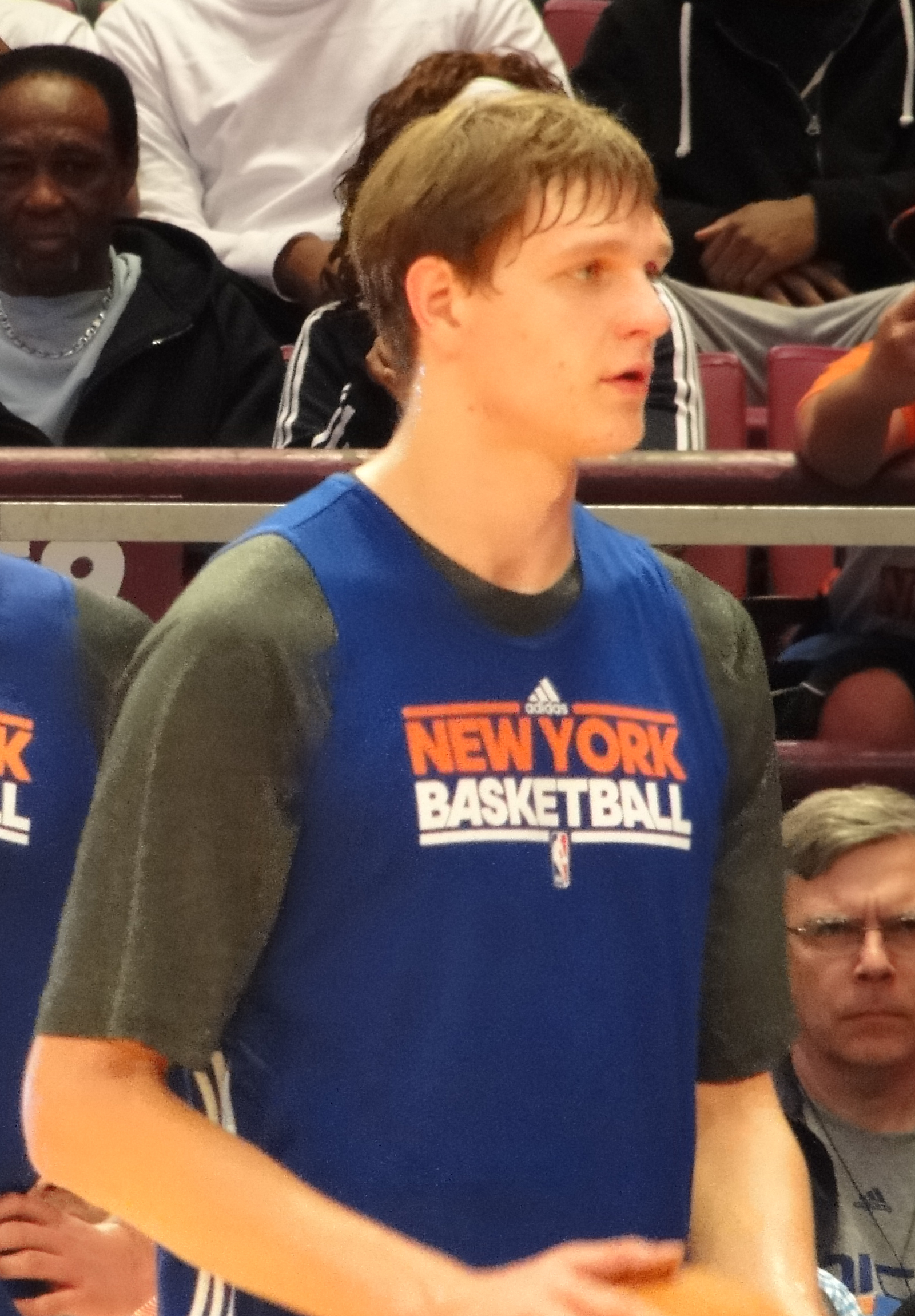
Mozgov with the Knicks in October 2009

In July 2010, Mozgov signed a three-year, $9.7 million contract with the New York Knicks. On 30 January 2011, he had season highs of 23 points and 14 rebounds in a 124–106 win over the Detroit Pistons.

=== Denver Nuggets (2011) ===
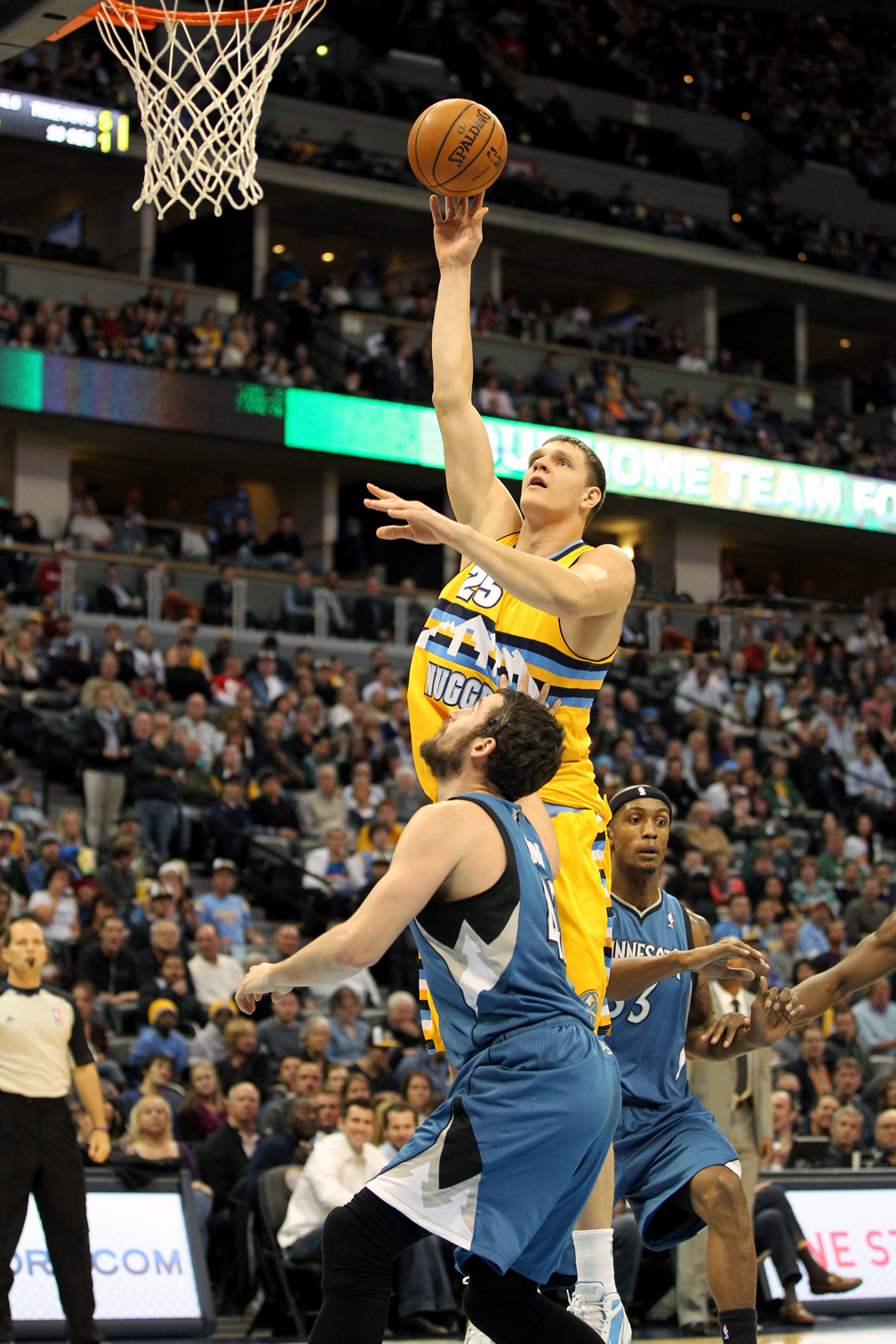
Mozgov with the Nuggets in November 2013

On 22 February 2011, Mozgov was acquired by the Denver Nuggets in a three-way trade, which also involved the Minnesota Timberwolves that brought Carmelo Anthony to New York.

=== Return to Khimki (2011) ===
On 21 July 2011, Mozgov joined Khimki Moscow Region for the second time during the 2011 NBA lockout.

=== Return to Denver (2011–2015) ===
Mozgov re-joined the Denver Nuggets in December 2011. On 21 January 2012, he scored a season-high 16 points in a 119–114 double-overtime win against his former team, the Knicks.

In 2012–13, Mozgov averaged 2.6 points and 2.6 rebounds in 8.9 minutes while shooting .506 from the field in 41 games.

On 27 July 2013, Mozgov re-signed with the Nuggets on three-year, $14 million contract. He scored a season-high 23 points three times, including a game with 23 points and a career-high 29 rebounds in a 100–99 win over the Golden State Warriors on 10 April 2014.

=== Cleveland Cavaliers (2015–2016) ===
On 7 January 2015, Mozgov was traded, along with a 2015 second-round pick, to the Cleveland Cavaliers in exchange for two protected 2015 first-round picks (via Oklahoma City and Memphis). Having always previously worn number 25, he was forced to change that upon joining the Cavaliers due to the franchise having the number retired for Mark Price. He instead chose number 20 as it was the number his father, a Soviet handball player, used while he played the sport. On 9 January, he made his debut for the Cavaliers, recording nine points and eight rebounds off the bench in a 112–94 loss to Golden State.

On 4 June 2015, he became the first Russian to play in the NBA Finals, as the Cavaliers lost Game 1 of the series to the Warriors. Timofey was the third leading scorer for the Cavs in the 2015 finals, averaging 14.0 points through 6 games. This included a 28 point and 10 rebound eruption in a pivotal Game 4. The Cavaliers went on to lose the series in six games.

On 23 June 2015, Cleveland exercised its option on Mozgov's contract for the 2015–16 season. He played a reduced role throughout the season, as the Cavaliers made it to the 2016 NBA Finals, where they defeated the Warriors in a rematch. Mozgov and teammate Sasha Kaun became the first Russians to win an NBA title.

=== Los Angeles Lakers (2016–2017) ===
On 8 July 2016, Mozgov signed a four-year, $64 million contract with the Los Angeles Lakers. The Lakers received "league-wide criticism" for the size of Mozgov's contract. The contract has been described as "huge", "dreadful", and "indefensible".

Mozgov made his debut for the Lakers in their season opener on 26 October 2016, recording 12 points and eight rebounds in a 120–114 win over the Houston Rockets. On 14 March 2017, the Lakers shut down a healthy Mozgov for the rest of the season to give the majority of playing time over the final 15 games to the team's younger players.

=== Brooklyn Nets (2017–2018) ===
On 22 June 2017, Mozgov was traded, along with D'Angelo Russell, to the Brooklyn Nets in exchange for Brook Lopez and the rights to Kyle Kuzma, the 27th pick in the 2017 NBA draft.

On 6 July 2018, Mozgov was traded, along with the draft rights to Hamidou Diallo, a 2021 second-round draft pick, and cash considerations, to the Charlotte Hornets in exchange for Dwight Howard. A day later, he was traded again, this time to the Orlando Magic in a three-team deal.

On 6 July 2019, Mozgov was waived by the Magic without having played a game, due to a knee injury. On 28 November 2019, the NBA approved the Magic's petition to have Mozgov's salary removed from their books due to the knee injury.

=== Third stint with Khimki (2019–2021) ===
On 31 July 2019, Mozgov signed a one-year deal to return to his home country and play once again for Khimki of the VTB United League and the EuroLeague. However, he did not play in the 2019–20 season due to his knee injury.

On 12 April 2021, Mozgov played in his first professional game since 2018, logging six points, six rebounds, and one assist in a 89–83 win over Enisey.

=== Runa (2021–2022) ===
On 23 December 2021, Mozgov signed with Runa Basket Moscow of the Russian Basketball Super League 1.

== National team career ==
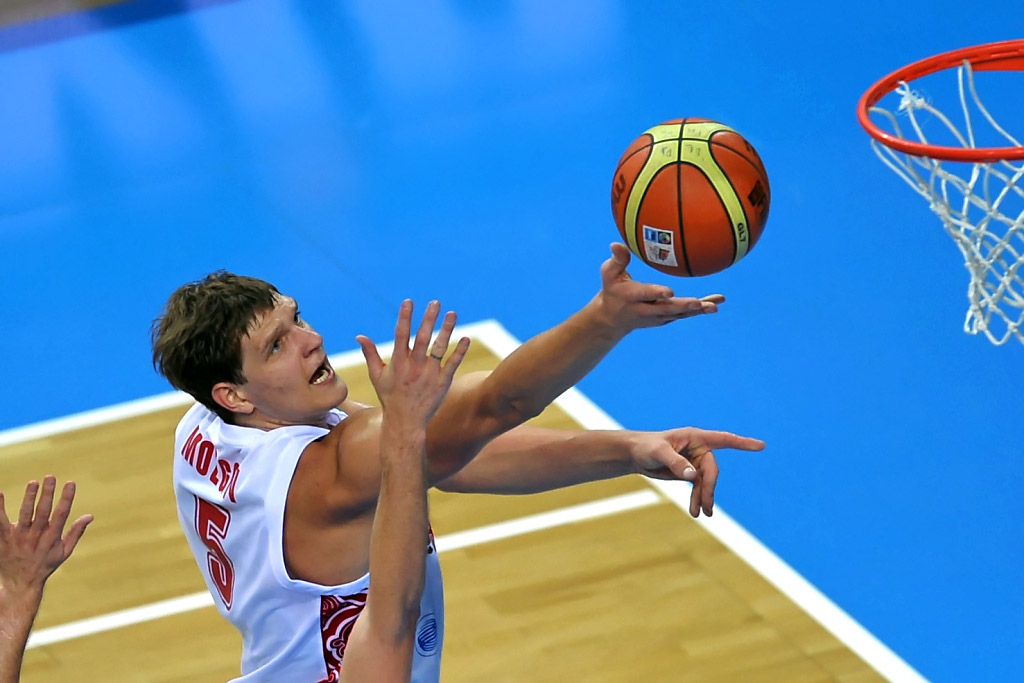
Mozgov playing for the Russian national team in 2011

Mozgov has also been a member of the senior Russian national basketball team. He played at EuroBasket 2009, EuroBasket 2011, and the 2012 Summer Olympics, winning bronze medals at the latter two.

== Career statistics ==
Legend
GP	Games played	GS	Games started	MPG	Minutes per game
FG%	Field goal percentage	3P%	3-point field goal percentage	FT%	Free throw percentage
RPG	Rebounds per game	APG	Assists per game	SPG	Steals per game
BPG	Blocks per game	PPG	Points per game	**Bold**	Career high
†	Won an NBA championship

=== NBA ===
==== Regular season ====
Year	Team	GP	GS	MPG	FG%	3P%	FT%	RPG	APG	SPG	BPG	PPG
2010–11	New York	34	14	13.5	.464	.000	.705	3.1	.4	**.4**	.7	4.0
2010–11	Denver	11	0	6.0	.524	.000	.750	1.5	.0	.1	.2	2.5
2011–12	Denver	44	35	15.6	.526	.000	.684	4.1	.5	.3	1.0	5.4
2012–13	Denver	41	1	8.9	.506	.000	.769	2.6	.2	.1	.4	2.6
2013–14	Denver	**82**	30	21.6	.523	.167	.754	6.4	**.8**	.3	**1.2**	9.4
2014–15	Denver	35	35	**25.6**	.504	**.333**	.733	**7.8**	.5	**.4**	**1.2**	8.5
2014–15	Cleveland	46	45	25.0	**.590**	.000	.708	6.9	**.8**	**.4**	**1.2**	**10.6**
2015–16†	Cleveland	76	48	17.4	.565	.143	.716	4.4	.4	.3	.8	6.3
2016–17	L.A. Lakers	54	**52**	20.4	.515	.000	**.808**	4.9	**.8**	.3	.6	7.4
2017–18	Brooklyn	31	13	11.6	.559	.222	.767	3.2	.4	.2	.4	4.2
Career		454	273	18.0	.535	.190	.738	4.9	.6	.3	.8	6.8

==== Playoffs ====
Year	Team	GP	GS	MPG	FG%	3P%	FT%	RPG	APG	SPG	BPG	PPG
2012	Denver	7	5	14.1	.480	.000	.500	3.3	.4	.3	.9	4.0
2015	Cleveland	**20**	**20**	**26.5**	**.500**	.000	**.790**	**7.3**	**0.9**	**.4**	**1.8**	**10.6**
2016†	Cleveland	13	0	5.8	.400	.000	.750	1.6	0.2	.2	0.2	1.2
Career		40	25	17.6	.589	.000	.763	4.8	3.5	.3	1.1	6.4

== See also ==
- List of European basketball players in the United States
