= Marcus Zegarowski =

American basketball player (born 1998)

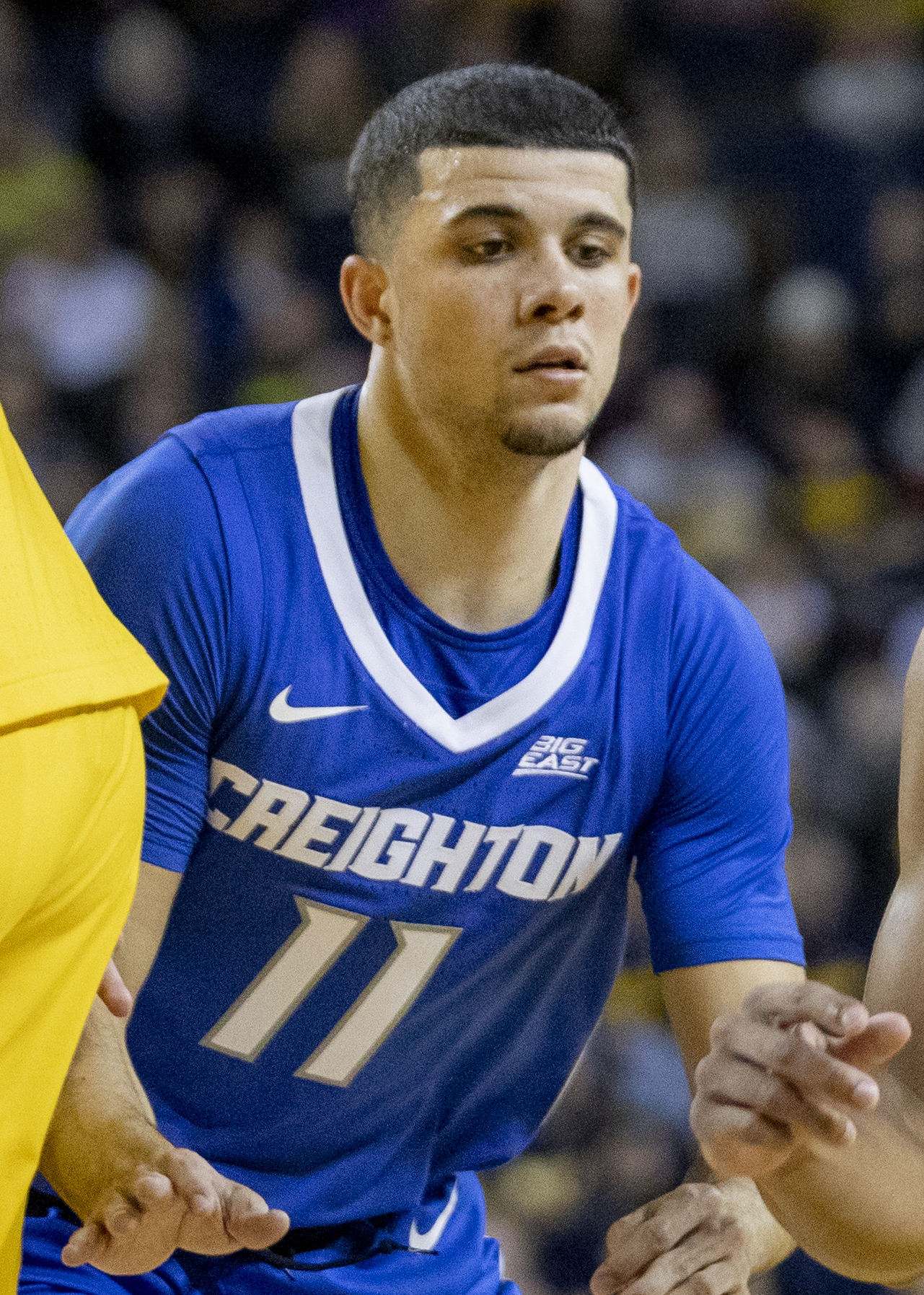
- Zegarowski with Creighton in 2019

Personal information
- Born: August 3, 1998 (age 28) Hamilton, Massachusetts, U.S.
- Listed height: 6 ft 1 in (1.85 m)
- Listed weight: 181 lb (82 kg)

Career information
- High school: Hamilton-Wenham (South Hamilton, Massachusetts); Tilton School (Tilton, New Hampshire)
- College: Creighton (2018–2021)
- NBA draft: 2021: 2nd round, 49th overall pick
- Drafted by: Brooklyn Nets
- Playing career: 2021–2024
- Position: Point guard
- Number: 11, 3

Career history
- 2021–2022: Long Island Nets
- 2022: Windy City Bulls
- 2022–2023: Austin Spurs
- 2023–2024: Vanoli Cremona

Career highlights
- 2× AP Honorable Mention All-American (2020, 2021); First-team All-Big East (2021); Second-team All-Big East (2020); Big East All-Freshman Team (2019)
- Stats at NBA.com
- Stats at Basketball Reference

Marcus Zegarowski (born August 3, 1998) is an American former basketball player. He played college basketball for the Creighton Bluejays.

== High school career ==
Zegarowski attended Hamilton-Wenham, where as a freshman he averaged 20 points per game. Alongside twin brother Max, Marcus led the team to an undefeated season and the school's first-ever Division 4 state basketball championship. Both Zegarowskis transferred to Tilton School in New Hampshire for their sophomore season. Marcus averaged 23 points, five rebounds, and six assists per game as a junior and had a season-high 37 points against Proctor Academy. He led the team to the Class AA championship game before losing to Cushing Academy, and he was named to the All-NEPSAC AA first team. As a senior, Zegarowski was named NEPSAC AA player of the year and scored a career-high 57 points in a 118–116 double overtime win over the South Kent School. He scored 24 points in a 99–92 win over St. Andrew's School as Tilton won the Class AA championship. Zegarowski committed to playing college basketball for Creighton over offers from Ohio State, Minnesota, and Washington.

== College career ==
On February 3, 2019, Zegarowski fractured his hand and missed three games. As a freshman, Zegarowski became Creighton's starting point guard and averaged 10.4 points, 3.4 assists, and 3.2 rebounds per game. He was named to the Big East All-Freshman Team. Zegarowski had an offseason hip injury that forced him to miss the team's exhibition trip to Australia. Zegarowski scored a career-high 32 points and had five assists and two steals on November 30, in a 83–76 overtime win over Texas Tech. On February 23, 2020, he made all seven three-point attempts en route to 25 points in an 81–59 win over Butler. On March 7, Zegarowski suffered a right knee injury during the game against Seton Hall, but still managed to post 23 points, six rebounds, and five assists in the win. He underwent arthroscopic surgery after the game, ending his season. Zegarowski averaged 16.1 points and 5 rebounds per game as a sophomore, shooting 42.4 percent from three-point range. He was named to the Second Team All-Big East and Second Team All-American by NBC Sports.

Coming into his junior season, Zegarowski was named Preseason Big East Player of the Year. He averaged 15.8 points, 4.3 assists, 3.6 rebounds and 1.3 steals per game and led the Big East with 80 three-pointers. Zegarowski was named to the First Team All-Big East and led the Bluejays to the Sweet 16 of the NCAA Tournament before falling to Gonzaga. On April 13, 2021, he declared for the 2021 NBA draft, forgoing his remaining college eligibility.

== Professional career ==
=== Long Island Nets (2021–2022) ===
Zegarowski was selected in the second round of the 2021 NBA draft with the 49th pick by the Brooklyn Nets. Zegarowski was later included in the roster of the Brooklyn Nets for the 2021 NBA Summer League. On October 25, 2021, Zegarowski was included in the training camp roster of the Long Island Nets. On March 18, 2022, the Long Island Nets waived Zegarowski. On September 25, 2022, the Brooklyn Nets signed Zegarowski to an Exhibit 10 deal. On November 4, 2022, Zegarowski was named to the opening night roster for the Long Island Nets.

=== Windy City Bulls (2022) ===
On November 12, 2022, Zegarowski was traded to the Windy City Bulls in exchange for Vrenz Bleijenbergh.

=== Austin Spurs (2022–2023) ===
On December 22, 2022, Zegarowski was traded from Windy City to the Austin Spurs.

=== Vanoli Cremona (2023–2024) ===
On September 19, 2023, Zegarowski signed with Vanoli Cremona of the Lega Basket Serie A.

=== Later years and retirement ===
On March 19, 2024, Zegarowski signed with Ironi Ness Ziona of the Israeli Basketball Premier League. On August 8, 2024, Zegarowski signed with Filou Oostende of the BNXT League. On February 26, 2025, he signed with Legia Warsaw of the Polish Basketball League (PLK). Due to injuries, Zegarowski never played a single minute for any of the three teams. On March 25, 2025, he announced his retirement on Instagram.

== Career statistics ==
Legend
GP	Games played	GS	Games started	MPG	Minutes per game
FG%	Field goal percentage	3P%	3-point field goal percentage	FT%	Free throw percentage
RPG	Rebounds per game	APG	Assists per game	SPG	Steals per game
BPG	Blocks per game	PPG	Points per game	**Bold**	Career high

=== College ===
Year	Team	GP	GS	MPG	FG%	3P%	FT%	RPG	APG	SPG	BPG	PPG
2018–19	Creighton	**32**	16	28.6	.453	**.426**	.769	3.2	3.4	.9	.0	10.4
2019–20	Creighton	31	**30**	**34.6**	**.488**	.424	.763	**3.8**	**5.0**	1.1	**.1**	**16.1**
2020–21	Creighton	29	29	33.6	.464	.421	**.786**	3.6	4.3	**1.3**	**.1**	15.8
Career		92	75	32.2	.471	.423	.772	3.5	4.2	1.1	.1	14.1

== Personal life ==
Zegarowski's older half-brother, Michael Carter-Williams, played in the National Basketball Association (NBA) and was named NBA Rookie of the Year in 2014. His older sister, Masey, plays NCAA Division I basketball for Bryant. Zegarowski has a twin brother, Max, who also plays Division I basketball for Stonehill College. Both his parents, Zach and Amanda (Mandy), played basketball in high school, and Mandy is a basketball coach.
