= Brett Brown =

American professional basketball coach

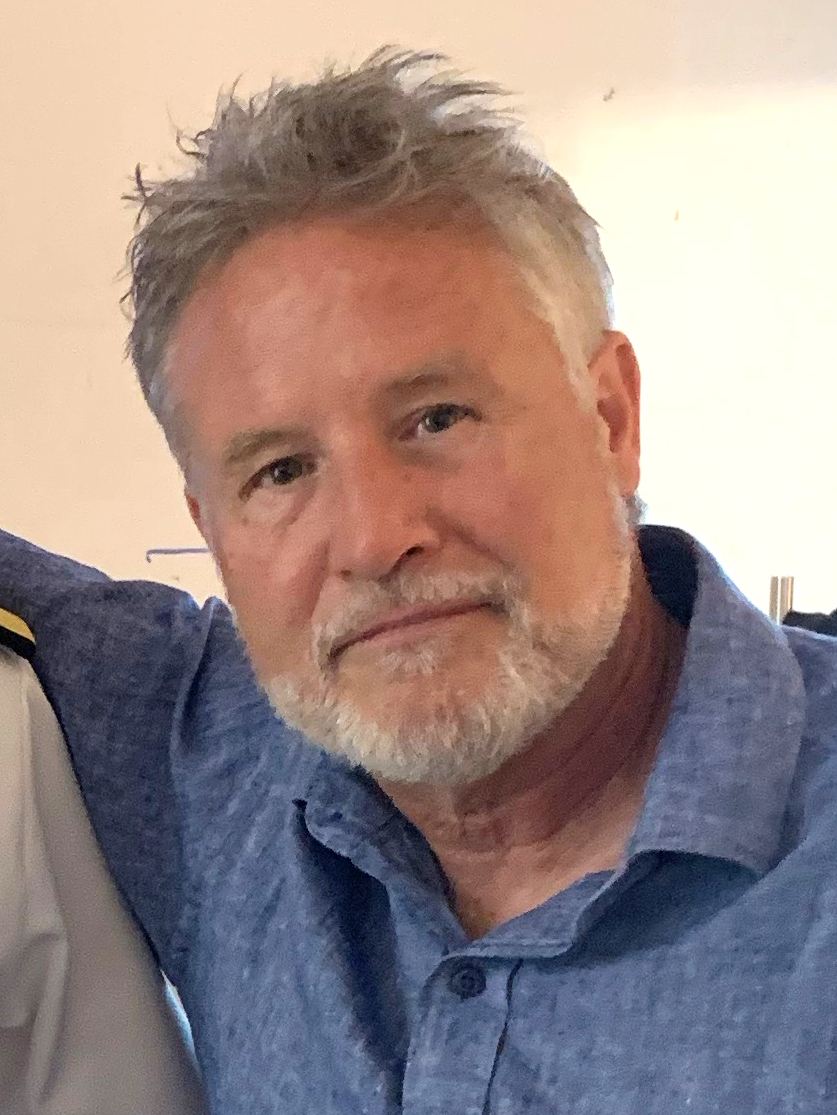
- Brown in 2019

San Antonio Spurs
- Position: Assistant coach
- League: NBA

Personal information
- Born: February 16, 1961 (age 65) South Portland, Maine, U.S.
- Listed height: 5 ft 11 in (1.80 m)

Career information
- High school: South Portland (South Portland, Maine)
- College: Boston University (1979–1983)
- Coaching career: 1988–present

Career history

Coaching
- 1988: Altos Auckland
- 1988–1991: Melbourne Tigers (assistant)
- 1992: Bulleen Boomers
- 1993–1998: North Melbourne Giants
- 2000–2002: Sydney Kings
- 2003–2013: San Antonio Spurs (assistant)
- 2013–2020: Philadelphia 76ers
- 2022–present: San Antonio Spurs (assistant)

Career highlights
- As head coach: NBL champion (1994); NBL Coach of the Year (1994); As assistant coach: 3× NBA champion (2003, 2005, 2007)

Brett William Brown (born February 16, 1961) is an American professional basketball coach who is an assistant coach for the San Antonio Spurs of the National Basketball Association (NBA). Brown is a former college basketball player who previously served as head coach for the Philadelphia 76ers from 2013 to 2020. Before that, Brown was an assistant on Gregg Popovich's staff on the Spurs. He also has extensive experience coaching in Australia, having been the head coach of the North Melbourne Giants and Sydney Kings of the National Basketball League (NBL).

== Playing career ==
=== High school ===
Born and raised in Maine, Brown first played organized basketball in Rockland, was a star guard in junior high school there, and then his father was hired as the head coach. Brown transferred to South Portland where he became a star basketball player at South Portland High School, from which he graduated in 1979. Brown was a two-year first-team all-state guard in 1978 and 1979, and led his team to a 27–0 record and a State Class A Title in his senior year. Both Brown and his father, Bob Brown, who was South Portland's head coach during Brown's playing career, are inductees to the New England Basketball Hall of Fame.

=== Collegiate career ===
Brown played four seasons at Boston University under Rick Pitino. He was named the Lou Cohen MVP in his sophomore year and served as the team captain in both his junior and senior seasons. During his senior year in 1983, the Boston Terriers made their first appearance in the NCAA Tournament since 1959. By the time he graduated, Brown had compiled the fourth-most assists in school history. After graduation, he served as a graduate assistant under coach John Kuester. Brown also took a sales job with AT&T, saving enough money to take a backpacking trip to Oceania in 1987.

== Coaching career ==
=== NBL ===
In 1988, after a coaching stint in New Zealand with Altos Auckland, Brown made a cold call to Melbourne Tigers head coach Lindsay Gaze, ultimately leading to a job offer. He spent four seasons as an assistant to Gaze in the Australian NBL.

In 1992, Brown secured his first senior head coaching position in Australia with the Bulleen Boomers of the South East Australian Basketball League (SEABL). There he coached Drederick Irving.

Brown became head coach of the North Melbourne Giants in 1993 and was named NBL Coach of the Year in 1994, when he led the Giants to a championship victory over the Adelaide 36ers. He served as head coach of the Giants until 1998, before taking a job with the San Antonio Spurs. Following his stint with the Spurs, Brown coached the Sydney Kings from 2000 to 2002. Overall, he was a head coach for 278 NBL games, winning 54 percent of the time.

=== San Antonio Spurs ===
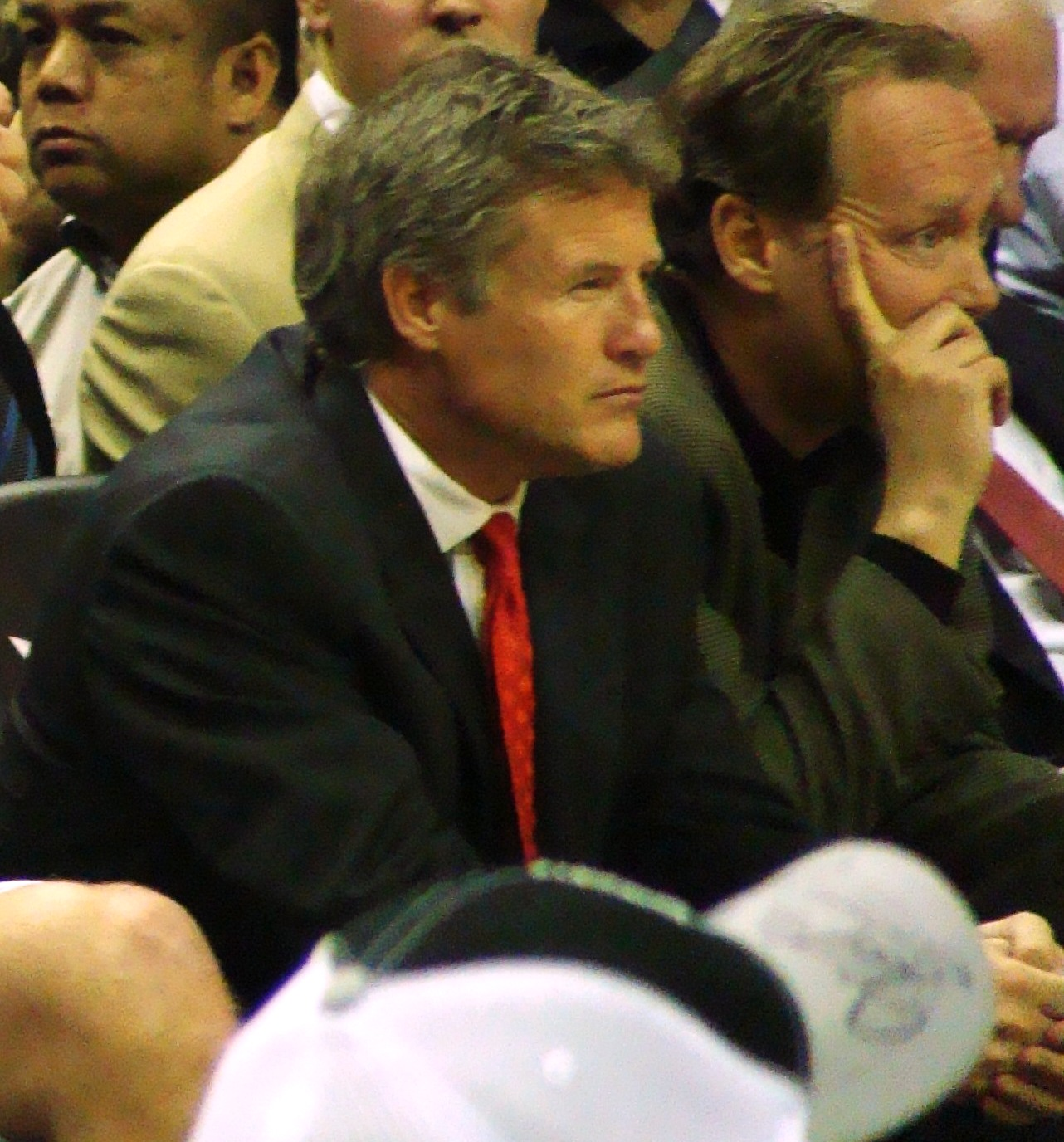
Brown as Spurs assistant coach in 2010

After attending a basketball camp run by Brown and Andrew Gaze, San Antonio Spurs general manager R. C. Buford hired Brown as an unpaid member of the Spurs' basketball operations department for the 1998–99 lockout-shortened season. In 2002, after a stint with the Sydney Kings, he again took a position with the Spurs, this time as the team's director of player development. Buford credited him with focusing attention on the team's lesser-known players, creating a consistently strong bench; this philosophy would continue to benefit the Spurs even after Brown left his role as player development director. He was promoted to assistant coach in September 2007, working under coach Gregg Popovich. Popovich calls Brown "one of his best friends," and Brown would later incorporate many of Popovich's concepts into his own offensive system. He played a major role in signing Australian guard Patty Mills, who played under him for the Australian national team. Brown was a member of the Spurs organization for four of their championship-winning seasons.

=== Philadelphia 76ers ===
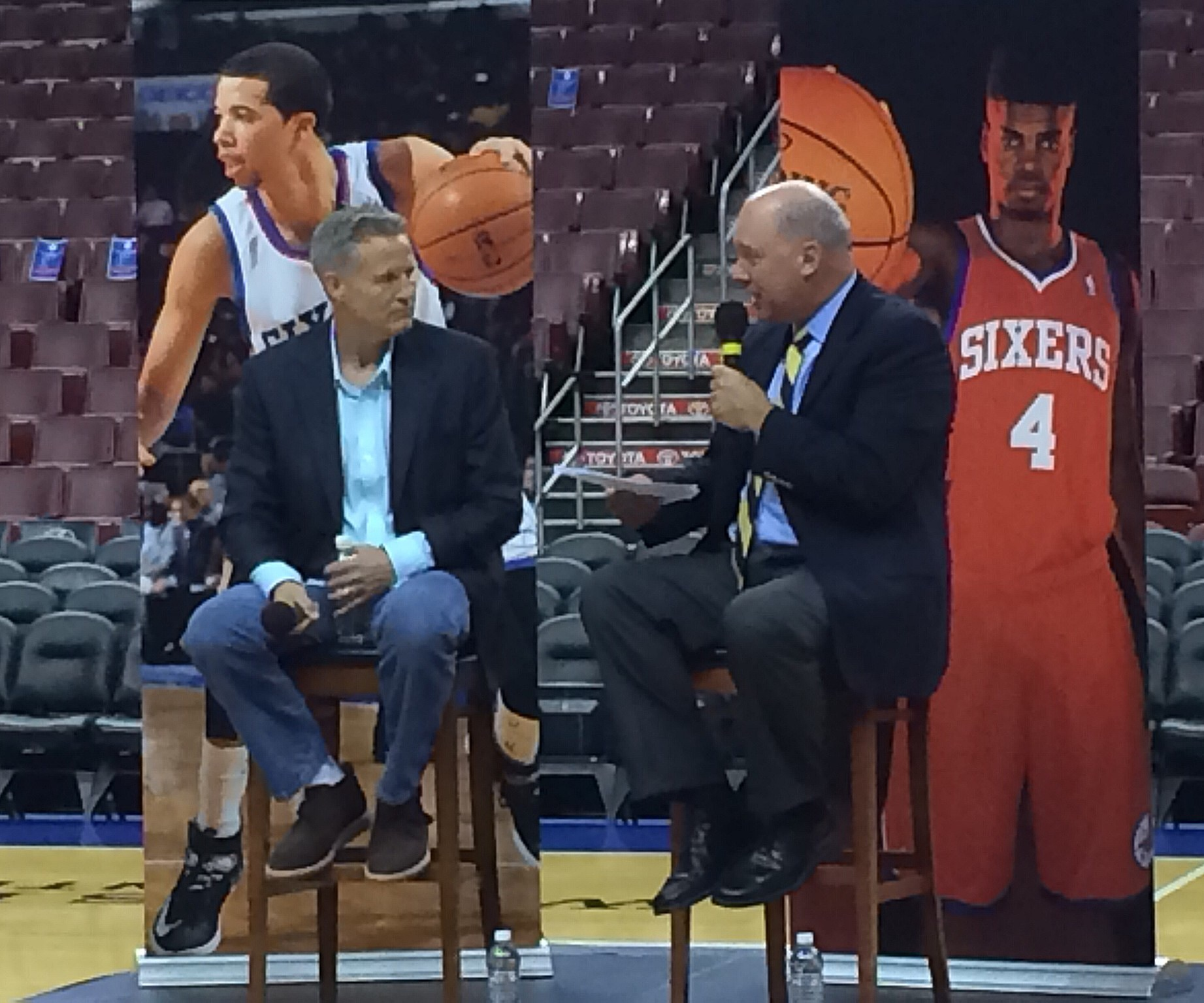
Brett Brown is interviewed at a 76ers fan meet and greet in 2014

During the 2013 NBA off-season, Brown was offered a chance to succeed Mike Budenholzer as the top assistant on Gregg Popovich's staff, but in August 2013, he chose instead to become head coach of the Philadelphia 76ers. He inherited a team in "total rebuilding mode" led by new general manager Sam Hinkie, and the Sixers were only able to woo Brown away from the Spurs after offering a 4-year guaranteed contract. His appointment made him the 24th head coach in the history of the franchise, and the second person to be a head coach in both the NBL and the NBA, following Mike Dunlap. The Sixers were the youngest team in the league during Brown's first year, and one of the youngest of all time. During the second half of the 2013–14 season, the Sixers would lose 26 games in a row, tying the record for longest NBA losing streak. Sixers point guard Michael Carter-Williams won the NBA Rookie of the Year Award in 2014, and credited Brown for helping him win the award and grow as a player.

On December 11, 2015, the 76ers signed Brown to a contract extension. On May 31, 2018, the 76ers signed Brown to another contract extension, coming off their first playoff appearance since 2012. On June 7, 2018, Brown was named interim general manager after Bryan Colangelo resigned after a social media scandal, where he and his wife criticized team members. Before the 76ers found his replacement in former player Elton Brand on September 20, 2018, Brown signed off on multiple trades that the 76ers did in the months of June & July, including an infamous trade during the 2018 NBA draft where Philadelphia native and 2x NCAA champion Mikal Bridges from Villanova University was traded to the Phoenix Suns for Zhaire Smith and a 2021 first round pick from the Miami Heat after being selected by the 76ers. He also signed off on the signings of players like Shake Milton, Norvel Pelle, and Anthony Brown at the time, as well as re-signing veterans like JJ Redick, Amir Johnson, and Demetrius Jackson.

On August 24, 2020, Brown was fired by the 76ers after being swept out of the first round of the 2020 NBA playoffs by the Boston Celtics.

=== Return to San Antonio ===
On June 30, 2022, Brown re-joined the San Antonio Spurs as an assistant coach.

== National team career ==
Brown was an assistant coach of the Australia national team between 1995 and 2003, serving during the 1998 FIBA World Championship and the 1996 and 2000 Summer Olympics. He was hired in 2009 to serve as head coach of the team, and held that position until 2012. Under Brown, Australia finished 10th in the 2010 FIBA World Championship. In the 2012 Summer Olympics, he led Australia to the quarter-finals, where they were eliminated by the United States national team, who won the tournament.

On November 27, 2019, Brown returned to Australia national team as head coach replacing Andrej Lemanis. He was expected to lead the team at the 2020 Summer Olympics but it was delayed by the COVID-19 pandemic until 2021. Brown quit his role on October 13, 2020, without having led the team in a game. He cited his career uncertainty after his firing from the 76ers and the difficulties of travelling with his family due to the COVID-19 pandemic as the reasons for his departure.

== Head coaching record ==
=== NBA ===
Legend
Regular season	G	Games coached	W	Games won	L	Games lost	W–L %	Win–loss %
Playoffs	PG	Playoff games	PW	Playoff wins	PL	Playoff losses	PW–L %	Playoff win–loss %

Team	Year	G	W	L	W–L%	Finish	PG	PW	PL	PW–L%	Result
Philadelphia	2013–14	82	19	63	.232	5th in Atlantic	—	—	—	—	Missed playoffs
Philadelphia	2014–15	82	18	64	.220	4th in Atlantic	—	—	—	—	Missed playoffs
Philadelphia	2015–16	82	10	72	.122	5th in Atlantic	—	—	—	—	Missed playoffs
Philadelphia	2016–17	82	28	54	.341	4th in Atlantic	—	—	—	—	Missed playoffs
Philadelphia	2017–18	82	52	30	.634	3rd in Atlantic	10	5	5	.500	Lost in conference semifinals
Philadelphia	2018–19	82	51	31	.622	2nd in Atlantic	12	7	5	.583	Lost in conference semifinals
Philadelphia	2019–20	73	43	30	.589	3rd in Atlantic	4	0	4	.000	Lost in first round
Total		565	221	344	.391		26	12	14	.462	

=== NBL ===
Legend
Regular season	G	Games coached	W	Games won	L	Games lost	W–L %	Win–loss %
Playoffs	PG	Playoff games	PW	Playoff wins	PL	Playoff losses	PW–L %	Playoff win–loss %

Team	Year	G	W	L	W–L%	Finish	PG	PW	PL	PW–L%	Result
North Melbourne	1993	29	14	15	.483	8th	3	1	2	.333	Lost in quarter-finals
North Melbourne	1994	33	25	8	.758	1st	7	6	1	.857	Won NBL Finals
North Melbourne	1995	34	23	11	.676	2nd	8	5	3	.625	Lost in NBL Finals
North Melbourne	1996	28	15	13	.536	7th	2	0	2	.000	Lost in quarter-finals
North Melbourne	1997	35	20	15	.571	3rd	5	2	3	.400	Lost in semi-finals
North Melbourne	1998	30	9	21	.300	11th	—	—	—	—	Missed playoffs
North Melbourne total		189	106	83	.561		25	14	11	.560	1 NBL championship
Sydney Kings	2000–01	31	18	13	.581	5th	3	1	2	.333	Lost in quarter-finals
Sydney Kings	2001–02	30	14	16	.467	7th	—	—	—	—	Missed playoffs
Sydney total		61	32	29	.525		3	1	2	.333	—
Total		250	138	112	.552		28	15	13	.536	1 NBL championships

== Personal life ==
Brown met and married his wife, Anna, in Australia. They have two daughters, Julia and Laura, and a son, Sam. The family resides in San Antonio, Texas.
