= Tony Wroten =

American basketball player (born 1993)

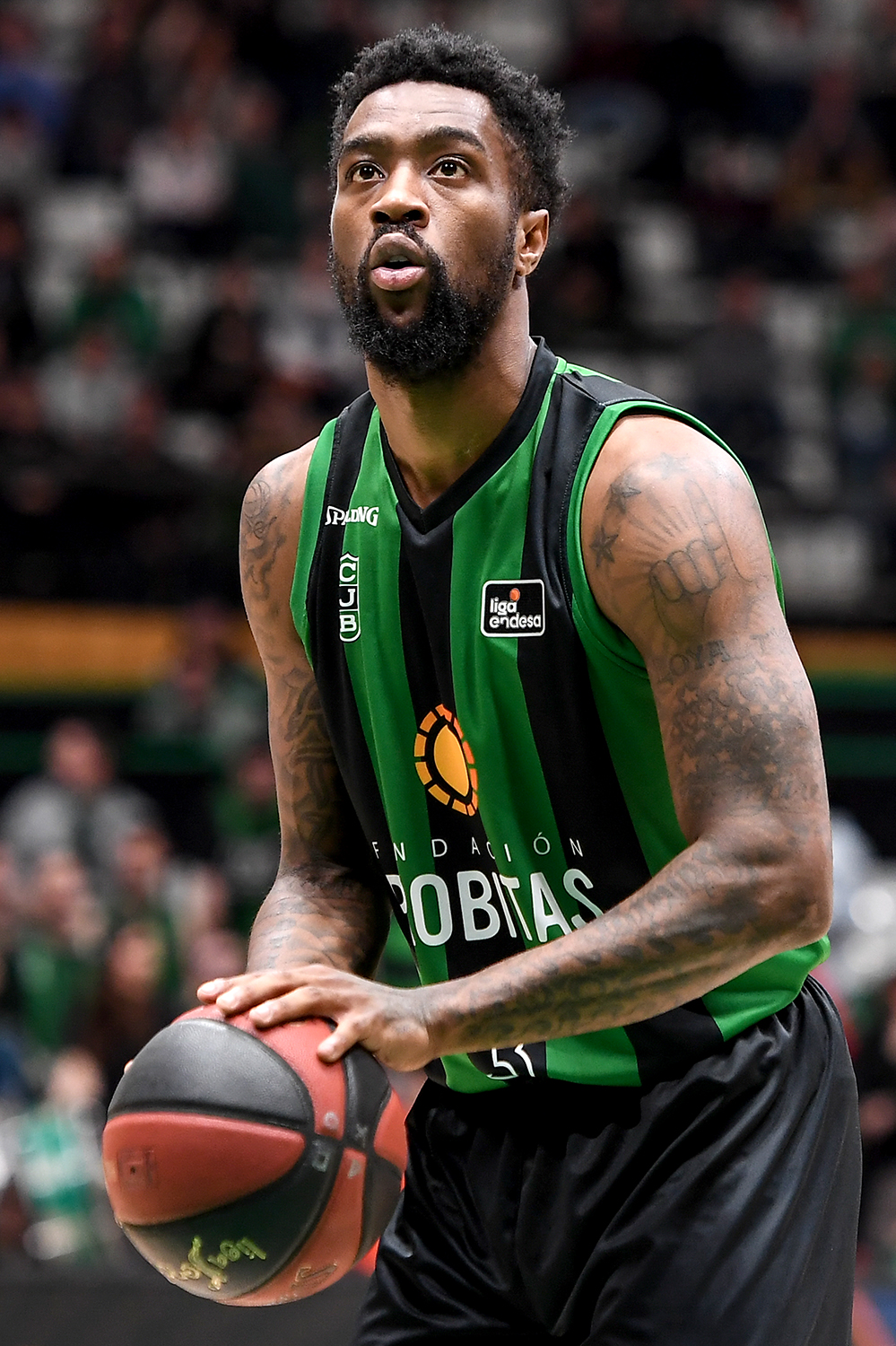
- Wroten in a 2019–20 ACB match with Club Joventut Badalona

Free agent
- Position: Point guard / shooting guard

Personal information
- Born: April 13, 1993 (age 33) Seattle, Washington, U.S.
- Listed height: 6 ft 6 in (1.98 m)
- Listed weight: 205 lb (93 kg)

Career information
- High school: Garfield (Seattle, Washington)
- College: Washington (2011–2012)
- NBA draft: 2012: 1st round, 25th overall pick
- Drafted by: Memphis Grizzlies
- Playing career: 2012–2022, 2024–present

Career history
- 2012–2013: Memphis Grizzlies
- 2012–2013: →Reno Bighorns
- 2013–2015: Philadelphia 76ers
- 2016–2017: Texas Legends
- 2017: Bucaneros de La Guaira
- 2017–2018: Rio Grande Valley Vipers
- 2018–2019: BC Kalev
- 2019–2020: Anwil Włocławek
- 2020: Joventut Badalona
- 2020–2021: Élan Béarnais
- 2022: Zamalek SC
- 2022: Iraklis Thessaloniki
- 2024: Urupan de Pando
- 2026: BK Vejen

Career highlights
- First-team All-Pac-12 (2012); Pac-12 Freshman of the Year (2012); Second-team Parade All-American (2011)
- Stats at NBA.com
- Stats at Basketball Reference
Medals
Men's basketball
Representing the United States
FIBA World U17 Championship
Gold medal – first place	2010 Hamburg	National team

Anthony Leon Wroten Jr. (born April 13, 1993) is an American professional basketball player. He played college basketball for the Washington Huskies, where he was a first-team all-conference selection in the Pac-12, before being drafted by the Memphis Grizzlies with the 25th overall pick in the 2012 NBA draft.

== High school career ==
As a freshman at Garfield High School, Wroten averaged 20.8 points, 8.7 rebounds and 3.8 assists per game. He was named to the 2009 All-Washington State Class 4A first team, becoming the first ever freshman to be named to the first team. In his sophomore season, Wroten averaged 17.6 points, 6.4 rebounds and 4.9 assists per game. Wroten was forced to sit out his junior season after an ACL injury in a football game. During his senior season, Wroten averaged 25.0 points, 7.5 rebounds and 4.1 assists per game. He was invited to the 2011 Jordan Brand classic game.

Considered a five-star recruit by Rivals.com, Wroten was listed as the No. 3 point guard and the No. 14 player in the nation in 2011.

== College career ==
In his freshman season at Washington, Wroten averaged 16.7 points, 5.0 rebounds and 3.6 assists per game. This was good enough for him to be named Pac-12 Freshman of the Year and to be named to the All-Pac-12 first team. He was the first ever freshman from Washington to be named to the All-Pac-12 Team. On April 3, 2012, Wroten decided to enter his name in the 2012 NBA draft, alongside teammate Terrence Ross.

== Professional career ==
=== Memphis Grizzlies (2012–2013) ===
Wroten was selected by the Memphis Grizzlies with the 25th overall pick in the 2012 NBA draft. During his rookie season, he had multiple assignments with the Reno Bighorns of the NBA Development League.

=== Philadelphia 76ers (2013–2015) ===
On August 22, 2013, the Grizzlies traded Wroten to the Philadelphia 76ers in exchange for a future second round pick and a trade exception. On November 13, 2013, in his first career start, he recorded his first triple-double with 18 points, 10 rebounds and 11 assists in a 123–117 overtime win over the Houston Rockets. The milestone marked the first time in NBA history that a player produced a triple-double in their first career start. On March 8, 2014, Wroten scored a then-career-high 30 points in a loss to the Utah Jazz.

On November 7, 2014, Wroten scored a career-high 31 points in a loss to the Chicago Bulls. On January 23, 2015, he was ruled out for the rest of the 2014–15 season after undergoing surgery on a partially torn ACL in his right knee. He was averaging career highs in points (16.9), assists (5.2) and steals (1.6) prior to the injury.

On November 11, 2015, Wroten was assigned to the Delaware 87ers of the NBA Development League, sent there to practice as part of his return to play protocol. He was recalled by the 76ers on December 4, using the month-long stint to rehabilitate his ACL tear. He did not appear in a game for Delaware. The following day, he returned to action for the 76ers, playing in his first game for the team since injuring his right knee on January 13. He had four points in 13 minutes against the Denver Nuggets. On December 24, 2015, Wroten was waived by the 76ers.

=== Texas Legends (2016–2017) ===
On March 16, 2016, Wroten signed with the New York Knicks. On June 22, 2016, he was waived by the Knicks; he did not play a single game for the team during his tenure.

On June 27, 2016, Wroten was claimed off waivers by the Memphis Grizzlies. He was later waived by the Grizzlies on July 12, re-signed on August 8, and waived again on October 7.

On December 1, 2016, Wroten was acquired by the Texas Legends. That night, he made his debut for the Legends in a 121–106 win over the Greensboro Swarm, recording 11 points, one rebound and one steal in 19 minutes off the bench. He was later waived by the Legends on January 28, 2017.

=== Rio Grande Valley Vipers (2017–2018) ===
On October 21, 2017, Wroten was selected by the Rio Grande Valley Vipers in round 2 with the 23rd pick in the 2017 NBA G League draft. On March 21, 2018, he was waived by the Vipers.

=== Kalev/Cramo (2018–2019) ===
On December 28, 2018, Wroten signed with Estonian club Kalev/Cramo of the Latvian-Estonian Basketball League (LEBL) and the VTB United League.

=== Anwil Włocławek (2019–2020) ===
On August 11, 2019, he signed with Anwil Włocławek of the Polish Basketball League.

=== Joventut Badalona (2020) ===
On January 30, 2020, he signed with Joventut Badalona of the Liga ACB. He averaged 11.2 points, 2.7 rebounds and 4 assists per game in ACB. Wroten parted ways with the team on April 29.

=== Zamalek SC (2022) ===
On January 16, 2022, Wroten signed with Zamalek SC of the Egyptian Basketball Super League.

=== Iraklis (2022) ===
On February 8, 2022, he signed with Iraklis of the Greek Basket League. Due to injuries, he appeared in only 3 league games, averaging 11.6 points, 4.7 rebounds, 3.7 assists and 1.3 steals in 27 minutes per contest.

=== Selfoss (2025) ===
After starting the season with Urupan de Pando in Uruguay, Wroten signed with Selfoss in the Icelandic second-tier 1. deild karla in December 2024. Though he trained with the team for a month, he left Iceland in February after the Directorate of Immigration denied his application for work permit due to his 2021 conviction in the NBA insurance fraud. In March, his appeal was rejected.

== Career statistics ==
=== NBA ===
Legend
GP	Games played	GS	Games started	MPG	Minutes per game
FG%	Field goal percentage	3P%	3-point field goal percentage	FT%	Free throw percentage
RPG	Rebounds per game	APG	Assists per game	SPG	Steals per game
BPG	Blocks per game	PPG	Points per game	**Bold**	Career high

==== Regular season ====
Year	Team	GP	GS	MPG	FG%	3P%	FT%	RPG	APG	SPG	BPG	PPG
2012–13	Memphis	35	0	7.8	.384	.250	**.724**	.8	1.2	.2	.1	2.6
2013–14	Philadelphia	**72**	**16**	24.5	**.427**	.213	.641	**3.2**	3.0	1.1	.2	13.0
2014–15	Philadelphia	30	15	**29.8**	.403	**.261**	.667	2.9	**5.2**	**1.6**	**.3**	**16.9**
2015–16	Philadelphia	8	3	18.0	.338	.176	.541	2.6	2.5	.4	.0	8.4
Career		145	34	21.2	.413	.231	.647	2.5	3.0	.9	.2	11.1

==== Playoffs ====
Year	Team	GP	GS	MPG	FG%	3P%	FT%	RPG	APG	SPG	BPG	PPG
2013	Memphis	6	0	2.8	.182	.000	1.000	.7	.3	.2	.0	1.3
Career		6	0	2.8	.182	.000	1.000	.7	.3	.2	.0	1.3

=== College ===
Year	Team	GP	GS	MPG	FG%	3P%	FT%	RPG	APG	SPG	BPG	PPG
2011–12	Washington	35	35	30.3	.443	.161	.583	5.0	3.7	1.9	.4	16.0

== Personal life ==
Wroten's father, Tony Sr., played football at the University of Washington and for the Tampa Bay Buccaneers. His mother, Shirley, ran track at Washington and at Arizona State University. Shirley still ranks top ten all time for Washington in the 100-meter dash, 100-meter hurdles, and 4 × 100-meter relay. His aunt, Joyce Walker, was a two-time All-American basketball player at Louisiana State University. She was also the third woman to ever play on the Harlem Globetrotters. Tony Wroten is the cousin of former New York Knicks point guard Nate Robinson and former Oregon State University basketball player Jimmie Haywood.

In October 2021, Wroten was indicted for insurance fraud in the Southern District of New York for allegedly defrauding the NBA's health and welfare benefit plan. For his part in the fraud, he received a three-month suspended sentence and a fine.
