= 2013–14 Philadelphia 76ers season =

NBA professional basketball team season

- Head coach: Brett Brown
- General manager: Sam Hinkie
- Owner: Josh Harris
- Arena: Wells Fargo Center

Results
- Record: 19–63 (.232)
- Place: Division: 5th (Atlantic); Conference: 14th (Eastern)
- Playoff finish: Did not qualify
- Stats at Basketball Reference

Local media
- Television: CSN (74 games); TCN (8 games)
- Radio: WPEN

The 2013–14 Philadelphia 76ers season was the 75th season of the franchise, the 65th in the National Basketball Association (NBA), and the 51st in Philadelphia. The season was notable for the 76ers tying Cleveland's former NBA record for most consecutive losses with 26, a streak that started with a 99–125 loss to the Atlanta Hawks on January 31 and ended with a 123–98 win over the Detroit Pistons on March 29. They were 14–31 after 45 games and finished with 5 wins and 32 losses in their last 37 games.

Rookie Michael Carter-Williams enjoyed a successful rookie season, earning Rookie of the Year honors at the end of the season. It was the only full season that Carter-Williams would spend in a Sixers uniform as he was traded to the Milwaukee Bucks midway through his sophomore year.

== Key dates ==
- June 27: The 2013 NBA draft took place at the Barclays Center in Brooklyn, New York.
- July 1: 2013 NBA Free Agency begins.

== Draft picks ==
Round	Pick	Player	Position	Nationality	College
1	11	Michael Carter-Williams	PG/SG	United States	Syracuse
2	35	Glen Rice Jr. (from New Orleans, (Note: On January 4, 2012, the Philadelphia 76ers acquired the Memphis Grizzlies' 2012 second round pick and the New Orleans Hornets' 2013 second round pick (the 35th pick) in a three team trade involving Marreese Speights.)traded to Washington) (Note: The Philadelphia 76ers traded 35th pick Glen Rice Jr. to the Washington Wizards in exchange for 38th pick Nate Wolters and 54th pick Arsalan Kazemi.)	SG	United States	Rio Grande Valley Vipers (D-League)
2	42	Pierre Jackson (traded to New Orleans) (Note: The New Orleans Pelicans traded 6th pick Nerlens Noel and a 2014 protected first-round pick to the Philadelphia 76ers in exchange for Jrue Holiday and 42nd pick Pierre Jackson.)	PG	United States	Baylor

== Roster ==
2013–14 Philadelphia 76ers roster
Players

Pos.	No.	Player	Height	Weight	DOB	From
G	9	James Anderson	6 ft 6 in (1.98 m)	210 lb (95 kg)	1989–03–25	Oklahoma State
G	1	Michael Carter-Williams	6 ft 6 in (1.98 m)	185 lb (84 kg)	1991–10–12	Syracuse
F	20	Brandon Davies	6 ft 10 in (2.08 m)	240 lb (109 kg)	1991–07–25	BYU
F	5	Arnett Moultrie (DL / S)	6 ft 10 in (2.08 m)	240 lb (109 kg)	1990–11–18	Mississippi State
F/C	30	Byron Mullens	7 ft 0 in (2.13 m)	275 lb (125 kg)	1989–02–14	Ohio State
F/C	4	Nerlens Noel (injured)	6 ft 11 in (2.11 m)	228 lb (103 kg)	1994–04–10	Kentucky
G/F	23	Jason Richardson (injured)	6 ft 6 in (1.98 m)	225 lb (102 kg)	1981–01–20	Michigan State
F/C	35	Henry Sims	6 ft 10 in (2.08 m)	248 lb (112 kg)	1990–03–27	Georgetown
G/F	7	Adonis Thomas	6 ft 7 in (2.01 m)	240 lb (109 kg)	1993–03–25	Memphis
G/F	31	Hollis Thompson	6 ft 8 in (2.03 m)	206 lb (93 kg)	1991–04–03	Georgetown
F/C	40	Jarvis Varnado	6 ft 9 in (2.06 m)	230 lb (104 kg)	1988–03–01	Mississippi State
G	17	Casper Ware	5 ft 10 in (1.78 m)	175 lb (79 kg)	1990–01–17	Long Beach State
G	25	Elliot Williams	6 ft 5 in (1.96 m)	180 lb (82 kg)	1989–06–20	Memphis
G	8	Tony Wroten	6 ft 6 in (1.98 m)	205 lb (93 kg)	1993–04–13	Washington
F	21	Thaddeus Young	6 ft 8 in (2.03 m)	230 lb (104 kg)	1988–06–21	Georgia Tech

Coaches
Head coach
- Brett Brown
Assistant(s)
- Chad Iske
- Lloyd Pierce
- Vance Walberg

Legend
- (DP) Unsigned draft pick
- (FA) Free agent
- (S) Suspended
- (DL) On assignment to
  D-League affiliate
- Injured

Roster
Updated: 2014–04–15

== Pre-season ==
2013 pre-season game log
Total: 2–5 (Home: 1–3; Road: 1–2)
Pre-season: 2–5 (home: 1–3; road: 1–2)

Game	Date	Team	Score	High points	High rebounds	High assists	Location Attendance	Record
1	October 6	@ Bilbao	W 106–104	Evan Turner (25)	James Anderson (7)	Michael Carter-Williams (6)	Bizkaia Arena at the BEC; 13,538	1–0
2	October 8	Oklahoma City	L 99–103	Tony Wroten (20)	Spencer Hawes (9)	Anderson, Young, Turner, Carter-Williams, Morris (4)	Phones 4u Arena; 13,472	1–1
3	October 11	Boston	W 97–85	Thaddeus Young (20)	Turner & Allen (9)	Carter-Williams & Wroten (6)	Bob Carpenter Center; 4,646	2–1
4	October 14	Brooklyn	L 97–127	Evan Turner (23)	Turner, Young, Hawes (5)	Turner & Carter-Williams (4)	Wells Fargo Center; 6,315	2–2
5	October 17	@ Charlotte	L 84–110	Tony Wroten (20)	Hollis Thompson (10)	Michael Carter-Williams (5)	Time Warner Cable Arena; 16,283	2–3
6	October 21	@ Cleveland	L 93–104	Hawes & Anderson (17)	Spencer Hawes (12)	Turner, Hawes, Carter-Williams (3)	Schottenstein Center; 11,276	2–4
7	October 23	Minnesota	L 102–125	James Anderson (23)	Evan Turner (10)	Evan Turner (5)	Wells Fargo Center; 7,938	2–5

2013–14 season schedule

== Regular season ==
=== Season standings ===
Atlantic Division	W	L	PCT	GB	Home	Road	Div	GP
y-Toronto Raptors	48	34	.585	–	26‍–‍15	22‍–‍19	11–5	82
x-Brooklyn Nets	44	38	.537	4.0	28‍–‍13	16‍–‍25	9–7	82
New York Knicks	37	45	.451	11.0	19‍–‍22	18‍–‍23	10–6	82
Boston Celtics	25	57	.305	23.0	16‍–‍25	9‍–‍32	5–11	82
Philadelphia 76ers	19	63	.232	29.0	10‍–‍31	9‍–‍32	5–11	82

Eastern Conference
#	Team	W	L	PCT	GB	GP
1	c-Indiana Pacers *	56	26	.683	–	82
2	y-Miami Heat *	54	28	.659	2.0	82
3	y-Toronto Raptors *	48	34	.585	8.0	82
4	x-Chicago Bulls	48	34	.585	8.0	82
5	x-Washington Wizards	44	38	.537	12.0	82
6	x-Brooklyn Nets	44	38	.537	12.0	82
7	x-Charlotte Bobcats	43	39	.524	13.0	82
8	x-Atlanta Hawks	38	44	.463	18.0	82
9	New York Knicks	37	45	.451	19.0	82
10	Cleveland Cavaliers	33	49	.402	23.0	82
11	Detroit Pistons	29	53	.354	27.0	82
12	Boston Celtics	25	57	.305	31.0	82
13	Orlando Magic	23	59	.280	33.0	82
14	Philadelphia 76ers	19	63	.232	37.0	82
15	Milwaukee Bucks	15	67	.183	41.0	82

=== Game log ===
2013–14 game log
Total 19–63 (Home: 10–31; Road: 9–32)
October: 1–0 (home: 1–0; road: 0–0)

Game	Date	Team	Score	High points	High rebounds	High assists	Location Attendance	Record
1	October 30	Miami	W 114–110	Evan Turner (26)	Spencer Hawes (9)	Michael Carter-Williams (12)	Wells Fargo Center; 19,523	1–0

November : 5–11 (home: 4–5; road: 1–6)

Game	Date	Team	Score	High points	High rebounds	High assists	Location Attendance	Record
2	November 1	@ Washington	W 109–102	Thaddeus Young (29)	Spencer Hawes (14)	James Anderson (6)	Verizon Center; 17,160	2–0
3	November 2	Chicago	W 107–104	Michael Carter-Williams (26)	Spencer Hawes (11)	Michael Carter-Williams (10)	Wells Fargo Center; 15,782	3–0
4	November 4	Golden State	L 90–110	Turner & Carter-Williams (18)	Hawes & Allen (8)	Darius Morris (5)	Wells Fargo Center; 11,089	3–1
5	November 6	Washington	L 102–116	Evan Turner (24)	Spencer Hawes (13)	Michael Carter-Williams (7)	Wells Fargo Center; 10,117	3–2
6	November 8	Cleveland	W 94–79	Evan Turner (22)	Evan Turner (10)	Michael Carter-Williams (6)	Wells Fargo Center; 15,219	4–2
7	November 9	@ Cleveland	L 125–127 (2OT)	Evan Turner (31)	Spencer Hawes (11)	Michael Carter-Williams (13)	Quicken Loans Arena; 20,562	4–3
8	November 11	San Antonio	L 85–109	Evan Turner (20)	Spencer Hawes (13)	Carter-Williams & Morris (4)	Wells Fargo Center; 12,424	4–4
9	November 13	Houston	W 123–117 (OT)	James Anderson (36)	Tony Wroten (10)	Tony Wroten (11)	Wells Fargo Center; 11,671	5–4
10	November 15	@ Atlanta	L 103–113	Evan Turner (27)	Spencer Hawes (12)	Tony Wroten (6)	Philips Arena; 12,070	5–5
11	November 16	@ New Orleans	L 98–135	Darius Morris (20)	Brandon Davies (8)	Spencer Hawes (3)	New Orleans Arena; 16,659	5–6
12	November 18	@ Dallas	L 94–97	Evan Turner (26)	Young & Hawes (11)	Evan Turner (7)	American Airlines Center; 19,790	5–7
13	November 20	Toronto	L 98–108	Spencer Hawes (28)	Hawes & Turner (10)	Michael Carter-Williams (6)	Wells Fargo Center; 10,787	5–8
14	November 22	Milwaukee	W 115–107 (OT)	Evan Turner (27)	Spencer Hawes (12)	Michael Carter-Williams (11)	Wells Fargo Center; 13,588	6–8
15	November 23	@ Indiana	L 98–106	Michael Carter-Williams (29)	Evan Turner (11)	Michael Carter-Williams (3)	Bankers Life Fieldhouse; 18,165	6–9
16	November 27	@ Orlando	L 94–105	Thaddeus Young (26)	Evan Turner (11)	Evan Turner (8)	Amway Center; 15,839	6–10
17	November 29	New Orleans	L 105–121	Tony Wroten (24)	Thaddeus Young (12)	Michael Carter-Williams (10)	Wells Fargo Center; 17,807	6–11

December : 3–10 (home: 2–3; road: 1–7)

Game	Date	Team	Score	High points	High rebounds	High assists	Location Attendance	Record
18	December 1	@ Detroit	L 100–115	Thaddeus Young (24)	Spencer Hawes (9)	Michael Carter-Williams (6)	Palace of Auburn Hills; 14,107	6–12
19	December 3	Orlando	W 126–125 (2OT)	Michael Carter-Williams (27)	Carter-Williams & Young (12)	Michael Carter-Williams (10)	Wells Fargo Center; 10,061	7–12
20	December 6	@ Charlotte	L 88–105	Tony Wroten (21)	Spencer Hawes (13)	Tony Wroten (9)	Time Warner Cable Arena; 14,088	7–13
21	December 7	Denver	L 92–103	Tony Wroten (20)	Hollis Thompson (9)	Evan Turner (5)	Wells Fargo Center; 13,113	7–14
22	December 9	L.A. Clippers	L 83–94	Evan Turner (25)	Thaddeus Young (11)	Tony Wroten (7)	Wells Fargo Center; 12,355	7–15
23	December 11	@ Minnesota	L 99–106	Spencer Hawes (20)	Evan Turner (8)	Lorenzo Brown (6)	Target Center; 13,450	7–16
24	December 13	@ Toronto	L 100–108	Tony Wroten (23)	Evan Turner (10)	Tony Wroten (5)	Air Canada Centre; 17,133	7–17
25	December 14	Portland	L 105–139	Tony Wroten (18)	Lavoy Allen (8)	Tony Wroten (7)	Wells Fargo Center; 10,189	7–18
26	December 16	@ Brooklyn	L 94–130	James Anderson (17)	Lavoy Allen (8)	Evan Turner (5)	Barclays Center; 16,733	7–19
27	December 20	Brooklyn	W 121–120 (OT)	Evan Turner (29)	Evan Turner (10)	Michael Carter-Williams (10)	Wells Fargo Center; 15,267	8–19
28	December 21	@ Milwaukee	L 106–116	Thaddeus Young (30)	Spencer Hawes (11)	Michael Carter-Williams (12)	BMO Harris Bradley Center; 14,541	8–20
29	December 28	@ Phoenix	L 101–115	Thaddeus Young (30)	Thaddeus Young (10)	Michael Carter-Williams (6)	US Airways Center; 15,623	8–21
30	December 29	@ L.A. Lakers	W 111–104	Thaddeus Young (25)	Thaddeus Young (9)	Evan Turner (6)	Staples Center; 18,997	9–21

January : 6–11 (home: 1–8; road: 5–3)

Game	Date	Team	Score	High points	High rebounds	High assists	Location Attendance	Record
31	January 1	@ Denver	W 114–102	Evan Turner (23)	Thaddeus Young (10)	Michael Carter-Williams Evan Turner (6)	Pepsi Center; 16,006	10–21
32	January 2	@ Sacramento	W 113–104	Thaddeus Young (28)	Evan Turner (10)	Evan Turner (6)	Sleep Train Arena; 16,259	11–21
33	January 4	@ Portland	W 101–99	Thaddeus Young (30)	Michael Carter-Williams Spencer Hawes (8)	Spencer Hawes (7)	Moda Center; 20,004	12–21
34	January 6	Minnesota	L 95–126	Thaddeus Young (20)	James Anderson (7)	Michael Carter-Williams (7)	Wells Fargo Center; 10,736	12–22
35	January 7	@ Cleveland	L 93–111	Michael Carter-Williams (33)	Michael Carter-Williams (6)	Michael Carter-Williams (5)	Quicken Loans Arena; 13,344	12–23
36	January 10	Detroit	L 104–114	Thaddeus Young (22)	Spencer Hawes (10)	Spencer Hawes (6)	Wells Fargo Center; 13,742	12–24
37	January 11	New York	L 92–112	James Anderson & Spencer Hawes (17)	three players (7)	Michael Carter-Williams (7)	Wells Fargo Center; 16,278	12–25
38	January 15	Charlotte	W 95–92	Evan Turner (23)	Spencer Hawes (14)	Michael Carter-Williams & Spencer Hawes (7)	Wells Fargo Center; 10,106	13–25
39	January 17	Miami	L 86–101	Tony Wroten (13)	Spencer Hawes (10)	Spencer Hawes (4)	Wells Fargo Center; 19,286	13–26
40	January 18	@ Chicago	L 78–103	Thaddeus Young (12)	James Anderson & Dewayne Dedmon (7)	Michael Carter-Williams (5)	United Center; 21,710	13–27
41	January 20	@ Washington	L 99–107	Michael Carter-Williams (31)	Spencer Hawes (16)	Michael Carter-Williams (5)	Verizon Center; 18,650	13–28
42	January 22	@ New York	W 110–107	Evan Turner (34)	Michael Carter-Williams (12)	Michael Carter-Williams & Spencer Hawes (7)	Madison Square Garden; 19,812	14–28
43	January 24	Toronto	L 95–104	Michael Carter-Williams (20)	Spencer Hawes (12)	James Anderson (5)	Wells Fargo Center; 11,489	14–29
44	January 25	Oklahoma City	L 91–103	James Anderson (19)	Thaddeus Young (10)	Evan Turner (6)	Wells Fargo Center; 19,217	14–30
45	January 27	Phoenix	L 113–124	Michael Carter-Williams (22)	Spencer Hawes (9)	Michael Carter-Williams (11)	Wells Fargo Center; 10,793	14–31
46	January 29	@ Boston	W 95–94	Spencer Hawes (20)	Spencer Hawes (8)	Evan Turner (8)	TD Garden; 18,624	15–31
47	January 31	Atlanta	L 99–125	Thaddeus Young (29)	Lavoy Allen (10)	Michael Carter-Williams (5)	Wells Fargo Center; 14,702	15–32

February : 0–11 (home: 0–5; road: 0–6)

Game	Date	Team	Score	High points	High rebounds	High assists	Location Attendance	Record
48	February 1	@ Detroit	L 96–113	Tony Wroten (18)	Spencer Hawes (8)	Tony Wroten (5)	Palace of Auburn Hills; 16,649	15–33
49	February 3	@ Brooklyn	L 102–108	Michael Carter-Williams (21)	Spencer Hawes (8)	Spencer Hawes (6)	Barclays Center; 16,727	15–34
50	February 5	Boston	L 108–114	Thaddeus Young (20)	Spencer Hawes (14)	Michael Carter-Williams (6)	Wells Fargo Center; 10,267	15–35
51	February 7	L.A. Lakers	L 98–112	Tony Wroten (16)	Spencer Hawes (11)	Michael Carter-Williams (7)	Wells Fargo Center; 15,211	15–36
52	February 9	@ L.A. Clippers	L 78–123	Tony Wroten (21)	Thaddeus Young (11)	Michael Carter-Williams (5)	Staples Center; 19,157	15–37
53	February 10	@ Golden State	L 80–123	Michael Carter-Williams (24)	Spencer Hawes (6)	Spencer Hawes (4)	Oracle Arena; 19,596	15–38
54	February 12	@ Utah	L 100–105	Evan Turner (21)	Spencer Hawes (11)	Michael Carter-Williams (8)	EnergySolutions Arena; 19,368	15–39
All-Star Break
55	February 18	Cleveland	L 85–114	Young & Carter-Williams (15)	Thaddeus Young (9)	Evan Turner (6)	Wells Fargo Center; 12,904	15–40
56	February 21	Dallas	L 112–124	Thaddeus Young (30)	Thaddeus Young(13)	Michael Carter-Williams(6)	Wells Fargo Center; 14,928	15–41
57	February 24	Milwaukee	L 110–130	Thaddeus Young (28)	Arnett Moultrie (8)	Thaddeus Young (7)	Wells Fargo Center; 12,216	15–42
58	February 26	Orlando	L 90–101	Thaddeus Young (19)	Hollis Thompson (7)	Michael Carter-Williams(4)	Wells Fargo Center; 12,817	15–43

March : 1–15 (home: 1–7; road: 0–8)

Game	Date	Team	Score	High points	High rebounds	High assists	Location Attendance	Record
59	March 1	Washington	L 103–122	Tony Wroten (19)	Byron Mullens (7)	Michael Carter-Williams(7)	Wells Fargo Center; 20,856	15–44
60	March 2	@ Orlando	L 81–92	Thaddeus Young (29)	Michael Carter-Williams(11)	Michael Carter-Williams(6)	Amway Center; 16,704	15–45
61	March 4	@ Oklahoma City	L 92–125	James Anderson (20)	Varnado & Mullens (6)	Michael Carter-Williams(5)	Chesapeake Energy Arena; 18,203	15–46
62	March 8	Utah	L 92–104	Tony Wroten (30)	Michael Carter-Williams(7)	Michael Carter-Williams(9)	Wells Fargo Center; 13,569	15–47
63	March 10	@ New York	L 110–123	Wroten & Carter-Williams (23)	Michael Carter-Williams (13)	Michael Carter-Williams (10)	Madison Square Garden; 19,812	15–48
64	March 12	Sacramento	L 98–115	Henry Sims (20)	Henry Sims (10)	Sims, Anderson & Young (3)	Wells Fargo Center; 11,109	15–49
65	March 14	Indiana	L 94–101	Thaddeus Young (25)	Michael Carter-Williams(9)	Thaddeus Young (10)	Wells Fargo Center; 14,754	15–50
66	March 15	Memphis	L 77–103	Michael Carter-Williams (23)	Michael Carter-Williams (8)	Carter-Williams & Young (3)	Wells Fargo Center; 15,164	15–51
67	March 17	@ Indiana	L 90–99	Thaddeus Young (23)	Michael Carter-Williams(13)	Michael Carter-Williams(5)	Bankers Life Fieldhouse; 18,165	15–52
68	March 19	Chicago	L 94–102	Thaddeus Young (24)	Michael Carter-Williams (9)	Wroten & Carter-Williams (7)	Wells Fargo Center; 13,222	15–53
69	March 21	New York	L 92–93	Michael Carter-Williams (22)	Sims & Carter-Williams (13)	Michael Carter-Williams (9)	Wells Fargo Center; 12,745	15–54
70	March 22	@ Chicago	L 81–91	Thaddeus Young (28)	Henry Sims (15)	Michael Carter-Williams (6)	United Center; 21,799	15–55
71	March 24	@ San Antonio	L 91–113	Sims & Young (17)	Byron Mullens (8)	Henry Sims (7)	AT&T Center; 17,798	15–56
72	March 27	@ Houston	L 98–120	James Anderson (30)	Thaddeus Young (9)	Michael Carter-Williams (10)	Toyota Center; 18,334	15–57
73	March 29	Detroit	W 123–98	Young & Carter-Williams (21)	Sims & Carter-Williams (7)	Tony Wroten (9)	Wells Fargo Center; 17,438	16–57
74	March 31	@ Atlanta	L 95–103	Thaddeus Young (23)	Michael Carter-Williams (9)	Varnado & Carter-Williams (9)	Philips Arena; 11,096	16–58

April : 3–5 (home: 1–2; road: 2–3)

Game	Date	Team	Score	High points	High rebounds	High assists	Location Attendance	Record
75	April 2	Charlotte	L 93–123	Michael Carter-Williams (22)	Michael Carter-Williams (7)	Young, Varnado & Wroten (4)	Wells Fargo Center; 12,136	16–59
76	April 4	@ Boston	W 111–102	Sims & Carter-Williams (24)	Henry Sims (9)	Michael Carter-Williams (6)	TD Garden; 18,624	17–59
77	April 5	Brooklyn	L 101–105	Thaddeus Young (20)	Henry Sims (11)	Michael Carter-Williams (11)	Wells Fargo Center; 16,133	17–60
78	April 9	@ Toronto	L 114–125	Henry Sims (22)	Michael Carter-Williams (9)	Michael Carter-Williams (8)	Air Canada Centre; 18,789	17–61
79	April 11	@ Memphis	L 95–117	Young & Wroten (18)	Sims, Carter-Williams & Davies (6)	Michael Carter-Williams (5)	FedExForum; 17,456	17–62
80	April 12	@ Charlotte	L 105–111	Michael Carter-Williams (23)	Carter-Williams & Mullens (7)	Michael Carter-Williams (8)	Time Warner Cable Arena; 17,140	17–63
81	April 14	Boston	W 113–108	Michael Carter-Williams (21)	Michael Carter-Williams (14)	Thaddeus Young (7)	Wells Fargo Center; 17,822	18–63
82	April 16	@ Miami	W 100–87	Thaddeus Young (20)	Thaddeus Young (9)	Tony Wroten (6)	American Airlines Arena; 20,350	19–63

2013–14 season schedule

== Player statistics ==
Legend
GP	Games played	GS	Games started	MPG	Minutes per game
FG%	Field-goal percentage	3P%	3-point field-goal percentage	FT%	Free-throw percentage
RPG	Rebounds per game	APG	Assists per game	SPG	Steals per game
BPG	Blocks per game	PPG	Points per game

=== Regular season ===
Player	GP	GS	MPG	FG%	3P%	FT%	RPG	APG	SPG	BPG	PPG
James Anderson	80	62	28.9	.431	.328	.726	3.8	1.9	.9	.4	10.1
Thaddeus Young	79	78	34.4	.454	.308	.712	6.0	2.3	2.1	.5	17.9
Hollis Thompson	77	41	22.6	.460	.401	.712	3.2	.9	.7	.2	6.0
Tony Wroten	72	16	24.5	.427	.213	.641	3.2	3.0	1.1	.2	13.0
Michael Carter-Williams	70	70	34.5	.405	.264	.703	6.2	6.3	1.9	.6	16.7
Elliot Williams	67	2	17.3	.415	.296	.731	1.9	1.1	.5	.0	6.0
Evan Turner^{†}	54	54	34.9	.428	.288	.829	6.0	3.7	1.0	.1	17.4
Spencer Hawes^{†}	53	53	31.4	.451	.399	.782	8.5	3.3	.6	1.3	13.0
Lavoy Allen^{†}	51	2	18.8	.440	.154	.675	5.4	1.3	.4	.5	5.2
Brandon Davies	51	0	11.3	.422	.200	.642	2.1	.5	.5	.2	2.8
Henry Sims^{†}	26	25	27.2	.489	.000	.766	7.0	1.8	.9	.5	11.8
Lorenzo Brown	26	0	8.6	.302	.100	.692	1.1	1.6	.5	.1	2.5
Jarvis Varnado^{†}	23	0	14.7	.600		.519	2.7	.6	.4	1.3	4.3
Daniel Orton	22	4	11.4	.447		.767	2.8	.7	.3	.7	3.0
Byron Mullens^{†}	18	0	13.7	.465	.400	.571	3.3	.4	.5	.4	6.8
Arnett Moultrie	12	2	15.6	.421		.800	2.9	.2	.7	.3	3.0
Darius Morris^{†}	12	0	16.1	.433	.417	.714	1.1	2.6	.7	.0	6.9
Dewayne Dedmon^{†}	11	0	13.6	.517		.538	4.5	.3	.0	.8	3.4
Casper Ware	9	0	12.9	.429	.333	.833	1.0	1.1	.9	.0	5.3
James Nunnally^{†}	9	0	12.3	.321	.333	.600	1.2	.7	.6	.1	2.9
Eric Maynor^{†}	8	0	14.0	.379	.333	.500	1.9	1.5	.5	.3	3.8
Darius Johnson-Odom	3	0	5.0	.000	.000	.000	.7	.3	.3	.0	.0
Adonis Thomas^{†}	2	1	6.5	.600	.500		.0	.5	.0	.0	3.5

- ^{†} Denotes player spent time with another team in the season. Stats reflect time with the 76ers only.
