= Spencer Hawes =

American basketball player (born 1988)

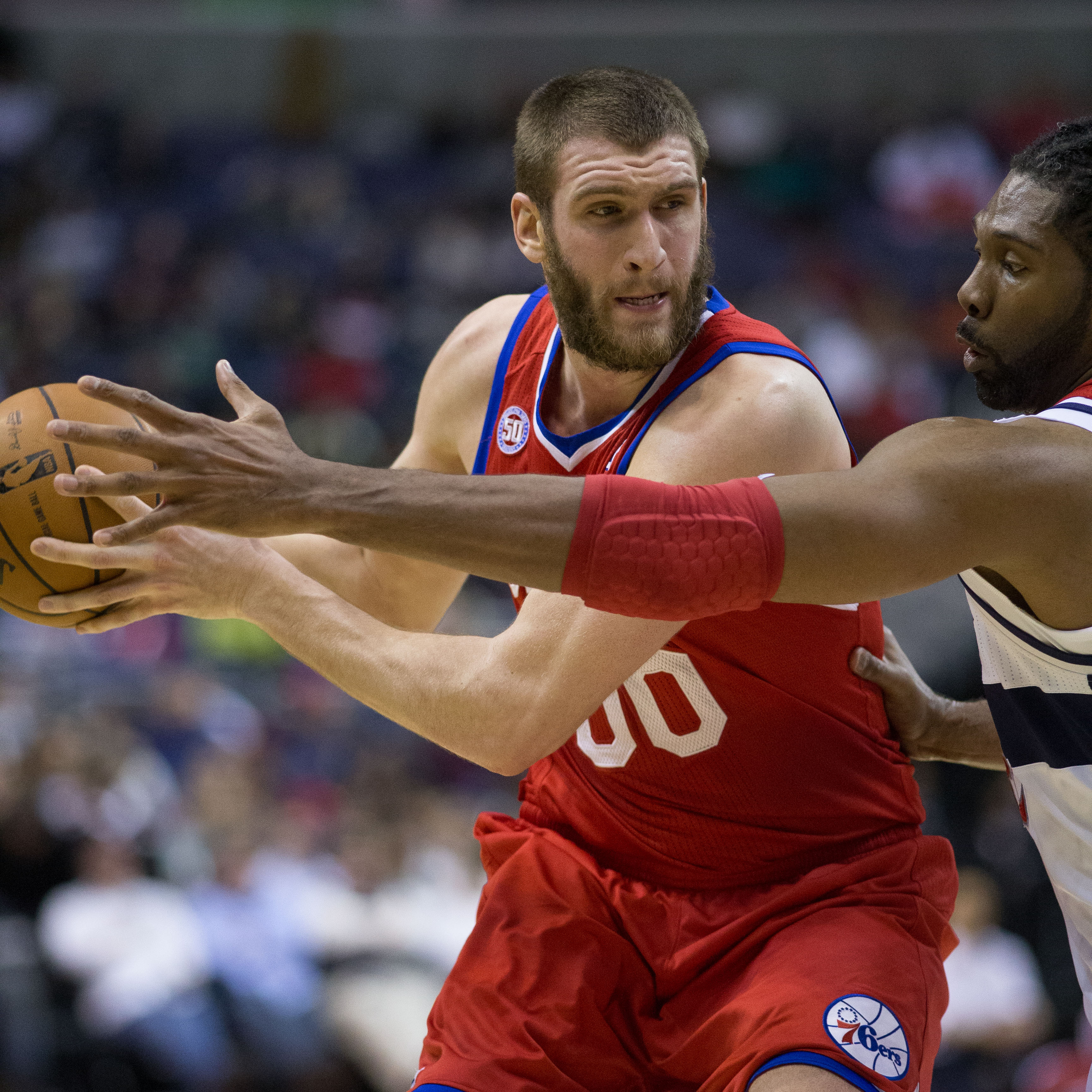
- Hawes with the Philadelphia 76ers in 2013

Personal information
- Born: April 28, 1988 (age 38) Seattle, Washington, U.S.
- Listed height: 7 ft 1 in (2.16 m)
- Listed weight: 245 lb (111 kg)

Career information
- High school: Seattle Prep (Seattle, Washington)
- College: Washington (2006–2007)
- NBA draft: 2007: 1st round, 10th overall pick
- Drafted by: Sacramento Kings
- Playing career: 2007–2019
- Position: Center / power forward
- Number: 31, 00, 32, 10

Career history
- 2007–2010: Sacramento Kings
- 2010–2014: Philadelphia 76ers
- 2014: Cleveland Cavaliers
- 2014–2015: Los Angeles Clippers
- 2015–2017: Charlotte Hornets
- 2017: Milwaukee Bucks
- 2019: South Bay Lakers

Career highlights
- Pac-10 All-Freshman Team (2007); McDonald's All-American (2006); First-team Parade All-American (2006); Washington Mr. Basketball (2006)
- Stats at NBA.com
- Stats at Basketball Reference
Medals
Men's basketball
Representing United States
FIBA Americas U18 Championship
| Gold medal – first place | 2006 San Antonio | Team |

Spencer Mason Hawes (born April 28, 1988) is a former professional American basketball player. A center, he was selected by the Sacramento Kings in the 2007 NBA draft and is the nephew of Steve Hawes, a retired NBA player.

== High school career ==
Hawes played center at Seattle Preparatory School, an elite college-prep school in Seattle, Washington. The team won the state championship in the 2005–06 season and Hawes was named the tournament MVP. He might have entered the 2006 NBA draft had the NBA not enacted a new rule requiring players to wait a year after their class graduates from high school. Following the 2005–06 season, Hawes was selected as an Associated Press All-American, McDonald's All-American, Parade All-American, and USA Today All-American. He was also named 2006 Gatorade Boys Basketball Washington Player of the Year and Seattle Times player of the year.

Considered a five-star recruit by Rivals, Hawes was listed as the No. 2 center and the No. 6 player in the nation in 2006. He also was nicknamed “Baby Calf” by his high school teammates because of how awkwardly he would move outside the basketball court, attributed by his quick growth spurt from 6’4 his freshman year to 6’11 by his senior year.

== College career ==
Hawes attended and played at the University of Washington, where his uncle, Steve, and his father, Jeff, both played basketball. Hawes led the Huskies in scoring with 14.9 points per game, ranked 10th in the Pac-10. Hawes also ranked second on the Huskies with 6.4 rebounds per game, ninth in the Pac-10. Spencer Hawes set a school record for freshmen with 461 points, despite missing one game due to a left ankle sprain. This record was later broken by Isaiah Thomas.

Hawes scored 20 or more points nine times, while posting three double-doubles. He was also named to the Pac-10 all-freshman team.

== Professional career ==
=== Sacramento Kings (2007–2010) ===
Hawes was projected to go as high as fifth overall to the Celtics to as low as twelfth overall to the 76ers. He was drafted by the Sacramento Kings with the 10th overall pick in the 2007 NBA draft.

Hawes played sparingly in his rookie season of 2007/2008. Although appearing in 71 games, he started only 8 and averaged 13.1 minutes per game. He averaged a modest 4.7 points, 3.3 rebounds, and .6 blocks per game with a .459 field goal percentage.

In his second season as a pro, opportunities opened up for Hawes when the starting center Brad Miller was traded to the Chicago Bulls. Hawes' numbers went up in every major statistical category, at 11.4 points, 7.1 rebounds, and 1.2 blocks per game with a .466 field goal percentage in 29.3 minutes per game. Hawes also started in 51 games, but missed the final game of the season due to an injury that occurred from a flagrant foul assessed to Kenyon Martin of the Denver Nuggets. The foul would result in controversy as Kings co-owner, Joe Maloof, would later state, "That (the hard foul) was thuggery, and you can quote me on that."

=== Philadelphia 76ers (2010–2014) ===
On June 17, 2010, he was traded along with Andrés Nocioni to the Philadelphia 76ers for center Samuel Dalembert. Hawes ended the 2010-11 NBA season having averaged 7.2 points per game.

On March 16, 2013, Hawes recorded 18 points, 16 rebounds, 8 assists and 7 blocks in a win against the Indiana Pacers.

On November 22, 2013, Hawes recorded 25 points, 12 rebounds, and 2 assists in a 115–107 OT victory over the Milwaukee Bucks. Hawes hit a clutch three pointer with 3.9 seconds left on the clock to send the game to overtime. In the 2013–14 season, Hawes was ranked 12th for three point field goal percentage in 2013–14.

=== Cleveland Cavaliers (2014) ===
On February 20, 2014, Hawes was traded to the Cleveland Cavaliers in exchange for Earl Clark, Henry Sims and two future second-round picks.

=== Los Angeles Clippers (2014–2015) ===
On July 9, 2014, Hawes signed with the Los Angeles Clippers. He had a 15-game starting stretch during February and March while teammate Blake Griffin recovered from a staph infection. During this stretch, he tied his season-high of 17 points in a loss to the Oklahoma City Thunder on February 8.

=== Charlotte Hornets (2015–2017) ===
On June 15, 2015, Hawes was traded, along with Matt Barnes, to the Charlotte Hornets in exchange for Lance Stephenson. During the Hornets' 2016 first-round playoff series against the Miami Heat, Hawes sustained a sprained medial collateral ligament in his right knee.

=== Milwaukee Bucks (2017) ===
On February 2, 2017, Hawes was traded, along with Roy Hibbert, to the Milwaukee Bucks in exchange for Miles Plumlee. Hawes didn't see a single minute of action in the first 11 games after he was acquired by the Bucks. He made his debut on March 3 with a late three-minute stint against the Los Angeles Clippers. The following day, he turned in a game-changing performance, scoring 14 second-quarter points, including back-to-back three-pointers and an acrobatic layup while drawing a foul, to spark the Bucks to a 101–94 win over the Toronto Raptors. He finished the game with 16 points, two shy of his season high, and eight rebounds in 17 minutes. On September 1, 2017, he was waived by the Bucks.

=== South Bay Lakers (2019) ===
On March 2, 2019, Hawes signed with the South Bay Lakers.

== National team career ==
Hawes debuted for USA Basketball in April 2006 as a member of the 2006 USA Junior National Select Team that defeated the World Select Team 109–91 at the Nike Hoop Summit in Memphis, Tenn.

In the summer of 2006, Hawes led all scorers with 24 points and added 10 rebounds, contributing to a United States men's team victory over Argentina in the gold medal game of the FIBA Americas under-18 Championship by a score of 104–82. Overall, Hawes averaged 12.0 points and 7.5 rebounds during the tournament. The U.S. team was coached by Hawes' eventual college coach, Lorenzo Romar.

== Career statistics ==
Legend
| GP | Games played | GS | Games started | MPG | Minutes per game |
| FG% | Field goal percentage | 3P% | 3-point field goal percentage | FT% | Free throw percentage |
| RPG | Rebounds per game | APG | Assists per game | SPG | Steals per game |
| BPG | Blocks per game | PPG | Points per game | **Bold** | Career high |
| * | Led the league |

=== NBA ===
==== Regular season ====
| Year | Team | GP | GS | MPG | FG% | 3P% | FT% | RPG | APG | SPG | BPG | PPG |
|---|---|---|---|---|---|---|---|---|---|---|---|---|
| 2007–08 | Sacramento | 71 | 8 | 13.1 | .459 | .190 | .655 | 3.2 | .6 | .2 | .6 | 4.7 |
| 2008–09 | Sacramento | 77 | 51 | 29.3 | .466 | .348 | .662 | 7.1 | 1.9 | **.6** | 1.2 | 11.4 |
| 2009–10 | Sacramento | 72 | 59 | 26.4 | .468 | .299 | .689 | 6.1 | 2.2 | .4 | 1.2 | 10.0 |
| 2010–11 | Philadelphia | 81 | **81** | 21.2 | .465 | .243 | .534 | 5.7 | 1.5 | .4 | .9 | 7.2 |
| 2011–12 | Philadelphia | 37 | 29 | 24.9 | .489 | .250 | .727 | 7.3 | 2.6 | .4 | 1.3 | 9.6 |
| 2012–13 | Philadelphia | **82*** | 40 | 27.2 | .464 | .356 | .777 | 7.2 | 2.2 | .3 | **1.4** | 11.0 |
| 2013–14 | Philadelphia | 53 | 53 | **31.4** | .451 | .399 | .782 | **8.5** | **3.3** | **.6** | 1.3 | 13.0 |
| 2013–14 | Cleveland | 27 | 25 | 29.8 | .468 | **.448** | .784 | 7.7 | 2.4 | .5 | 1.0 | **13.5** |
| 2014–15 | L.A. Clippers | 73 | 15 | 17.5 | .393 | .313 | .647 | 3.5 | 1.2 | .3 | .7 | 5.8 |
| 2015–16 | Charlotte | 57 | 6 | 18.2 | .405 | .373 | .831 | 4.3 | 1.9 | .4 | .5 | 6.0 |
| 2016–17 | Charlotte | 35 | 1 | 17.9 | .477 | .291 | **.882** | 4.2 | 1.8 | .4 | .7 | 7.3 |
| 2016–17 | Milwaukee | 19 | 0 | 9.0 | **.508** | .346 | .778 | 2.4 | 1.0 | .1 | .2 | 4.4 |
| Career | | 684 | 368 | 22.7 | .457 | .350 | .716 | 5.7 | 1.9 | .4 | 1.0 | 8.7 |

==== Playoffs ====
| Year | Team | GP | GS | MPG | FG% | 3P% | FT% | RPG | APG | SPG | BPG | PPG |
|---|---|---|---|---|---|---|---|---|---|---|---|---|
| 2011 | Philadelphia | 5 | 5 | 19.6 | .364 | .000 | .500 | 3.8 | **1.8** | .0 | .4 | 5.2 |
| 2012 | Philadelphia | **13** | **12** | **25.5** | .463 | .400 | .731 | **6.6** | 1.6 | **.3** | **.8** | **9.3** |
| 2015 | L.A. Clippers | 8 | 0 | 7.1 | **.529** | **.500** | **1.000** | 1.6 | .6 | **.3** | .4 | 2.9 |
| 2016 | Charlotte | 5 | 0 | 10.6 | .462 | .250 | .833 | 3.2 | .6 | .2 | .4 | 3.6 |
| 2017 | Milwaukee | 3 | 0 | 5.7 | .400 | **.500** | – | 1.3 | .3 | .0 | .3 | 1.7 |
| Career | | 34 | 17 | 16.4 | .449 | .389 | .737 | 4.1 | 1.1 | .2 | .6 | 5.7 |

=== College ===
| Year | Team | GP | GS | MPG | FG% | 3P% | FT% | RPG | APG | SPG | BPG | PPG |
|---|---|---|---|---|---|---|---|---|---|---|---|---|
| 2006–07 | Washington | 31 | 24 | 28.9 | .532 | .333 | .755 | 6.4 | 1.9 | .5 | 1.7 | 14.9 |

== See also ==
- 2006 high school boys basketball All-Americans
