= 2014–15 Philadelphia 76ers season =

NBA professional basketball team season

- Head coach: Brett Brown
- General manager: Sam Hinkie
- Owner: Josh Harris
- Arena: Wells Fargo Center

Results
- Record: 18–64 (.220)
- Place: Division: 4th (Atlantic); Conference: 14th (Eastern)
- Playoff finish: Did not qualify
- Stats at Basketball Reference

Local media
- Television: CSN (73 games); TCN (9 games)
- Radio: WPEN

The 2014–15 Philadelphia 76ers season was the 76th season of the franchise in the National Basketball Association (NBA).

The 76ers 2013 NBA draft pick, Nerlens Noel, would play his first season in a Sixer uniform, but for the third straight year, they acquired a center (by draft or trade) that would not play for them the first year, as number 3 overall pick Joel Embiid was out with foot and back issues. Michael Carter Williams was traded to the Milwaukee Bucks for draft picks. On December 1, 2014, the 76ers lost their 17th straight game to start the season 0–17, one loss shy of the New Jersey Nets 0–18 mark in 2009–10. On December 3, the 76ers won their first game of the season against the Minnesota Timberwolves avoiding the worst start without a win. The team finished with a record of 18–64 tied for the third worst record in franchise history (1995–1996, 18 wins; 2015–2016, 10 wins; 1972–1973, 9 wins).

== Preseason ==
=== Draft picks ===
Round	Pick	Player	Position	Nationality	College
1	3	Joel Embiid	C	Cameroon	Kansas
1	10	Elfrid Payton	PG	United States	Louisiana-Lafayette
2	32	K. J. McDaniels	SF	United States	Clemson
2	39	Jerami Grant	SF	United States	Syracuse
2	47	Russ Smith	PG	United States	Louisville
2	52	Vasilije Micić	PG	Serbia	Mega Vizura (Serbia)
2	54	Nemanja Dangubić	SG	Serbia	Mega Vizura (Serbia)

== Regular season ==
=== Standings ===
Atlantic Division	W	L	PCT	GB	Home	Road	Div	GP
y-Toronto Raptors	49	33	.598	–	27‍–‍14	22‍–‍19	11–5	82
x-Boston Celtics	40	42	.488	9.0	21‍–‍20	19‍–‍22	12–4	82
x-Brooklyn Nets	38	44	.463	11.0	19‍–‍22	19‍–‍22	10–6	82
Philadelphia 76ers	18	64	.220	31.0	12‍–‍29	6‍–‍35	2–14	82
New York Knicks	17	65	.207	32.0	10‍–‍31	7‍–‍34	5–11	82

Eastern Conference
#	Team	W	L	PCT	GB	GP
1	c-Atlanta Hawks *	60	22	.732	–	82
2	y-Cleveland Cavaliers *	53	29	.646	7.0	82
3	x-Chicago Bulls	50	32	.610	10.0	82
4	y-Toronto Raptors *	49	33	.598	11.0	82
5	x-Washington Wizards	46	36	.561	14.0	82
6	x-Milwaukee Bucks	41	41	.500	19.0	82
7	x-Boston Celtics	40	42	.488	20.0	82
8	x-Brooklyn Nets	38	44	.463	22.0	82
9	Indiana Pacers	38	44	.463	22.0	82
10	Miami Heat	37	45	.451	23.0	82
11	Charlotte Hornets	33	49	.402	27.0	82
12	Detroit Pistons	32	50	.390	28.0	82
13	Orlando Magic	25	57	.305	35.0	82
14	Philadelphia 76ers	18	64	.220	42.0	82
15	New York Knicks	17	65	.207	43.0	82

== Game log ==
=== Preseason ===
2014 pre-season game log
Total: 2–6 (Home: 2–2; Road: 0–4)
Pre-season: 2–6 (home: 2–2; road: 0–4)

Game	Date	Team	Score	High points	High rebounds	High assists	Location Attendance	Record
1	October 6	@ Boston	L 78–98	Tony Wroten (19)	Henry Sims (10)	Tony Wroten (5)	TD Garden; 14,143	0–1
2	October 8	Charlotte	W 106–92	Tony Wroten (15)	Nerlens Noel (9)	Tony Wroten (7)	Wells Fargo Center; 8,141	1–1
3	October 10	@ Minnesota	L 110–116	Henry Sims (17)	Henry Sims (6)	Casper Ware (7)	Target Center; 9,076	1–2
4	October 14	New York	L 77–84	Nerlens Noel (12)	Nerlens Noel (11)	Casper Ware (5)	Carrier Dome; 11,259	1–3
5	October 16	Boston	L 91–111	Elliot Williams (17)	Henry Sims (10)	Casper Ware (6)	Wells Fargo Center; 8,201	1–4
6	October 18	Orlando	W 95–84	Drew Gordon (16)	Arnett Moultrie (8)	Elliot Williams (5)	PPL Center; 5,764	2–4
7	October 20	@ Brooklyn	L 88–99	Henry Sims (13)	Drew Gordon (9)	Brandon Davies (5)	Barclays Center; 12,271	2–5
8	October 23	@ Detroit	L 103–109	Henry Sims (17)	Nerlens Noel (8)	Tony Wroten (5)	Palace of Auburn Hills; 11,666	2–6

2014–15 season schedule

=== Regular season ===
2014–15 game log
- Total: 18–64 (Home: 12–29; Road: 6–35)
October: 0–2 (home: 0–0; road: 0–2)

Game	Date	Team	Score	High points	High rebounds	High assists	Location Attendance	Record
1	October 29	@ Indiana	L 91–103	Tony Wroten (22)	Nerlens Noel (10)	Tony Wroten (7)	Bankers Life Fieldhouse; 18,165	0–1
2	October 31	@ Milwaukee	L 81–93	Hollis Thompson (15)	Nerlens Noel (10)	Tony Wroten (6)	BMO Harris Bradley Center; 18,717	0–2

November : 0–14 (home: 0–9; road: 0–5)

Game	Date	Team	Score	High points	High rebounds	High assists	Location Attendance	Record
3	November 1	Miami	L 96–114	Tony Wroten (21)	Malcolm Thomas (9)	Tony Wroten (10)	Wells Fargo Center; 19,753	0–3
4	November 3	Houston	L 93–104	Tony Wroten (20)	Tony Wroten (5)	Nerlens Noel (5)	Wells Fargo Center; 12,896	0–4
5	November 5	Orlando	L 89–91	Tony Wroten (27)	Hollis Thompson (9)	Tony Wroten (8)	Wells Fargo Center; 12,111	0–5
6	November 7	Chicago	L 115–118	Tony Wroten (31)	Luc Mbah a Moute (11)	Tony Wroten (7)	Wells Fargo Center; 16,820	0–6
7	November 9	@ Toronto	L 88–120	Tony Wroten (18)	Henry Sims (8)	Tony Wroten (5)	Air Canada Centre; 18,470	0–7
8	November 13	@ Dallas	L 70–123	Michael Carter-Williams (19)	Michael Carter-Williams (8)	Michael Carter-Williams (5)	American Airlines Center; 19,604	0–8
9	November 14	@ Houston	L 87–88	Tony Wroten (19)	Luc Mbah a Moute (9)	Tony Wroten (8)	Toyota Center; 18,138	0–9
10	November 17	@ San Antonio	L 75–100	Michael Carter-Williams (16)	Henry Sims (8)	Carter-Williams & Brandon Davies (4)	AT&T Center; 18,581	0–10
11	November 19	Boston	L 90–101	Tony Wroten (21)	Nerlens Noel (8)	Tony Wroten (7)	Wells Fargo Center; 12,701	0–11
12	November 21	Phoenix	L 96–122	Michael Carter-Williams (18)	Henry Sims (7)	Michael Carter-Williams (6)	Wells Fargo Center; 16,789	0–12
13	November 22	@ New York	L 83–91	Nerlens Noel (17)	Nerlens Noel (12)	Tony Wroten (7)	Madison Square Garden; 19,812	0–13
14	November 24	Portland	L 104–114	Michael Carter-Williams (24)	Michael Carter-Williams (7)	Tony Wroten (9)	Wells Fargo Center; 11,094	0–14
15	November 26	Brooklyn	L 91–99	Tony Wroten & K.J. McDaniels (18)	Henry Sims (7)	Tony Wroten (9)	Wells Fargo Center; 11,223	0–15
16	November 29	Dallas	L 103–110	K.J. McDaniels (21)	K.J. McDaniels (13)	Michael Carter-Williams (16)	Wells Fargo Center; 16,145	0–16

December : 4–10 (home: 0–5; road: 4–5)

Game	Date	Team	Score	High points	High rebounds	High assists	Location Attendance	Record
17	December 1	San Antonio	L 103–109	Michael Carter-Williams (24)	Michael Carter-Williams (11)	Michael Carter-Williams (7)	Wells Fargo Center; 12,843	0–17
18	December 3	@ Minnesota	W 85–77	Michael Carter-Williams (20)	Carter-Williams & Luc Mbah a Moute (9)	Michael Carter-Williams (9)	Target Center; 10,463	1–17
19	December 5 NBA TV	Oklahoma City	L 91–103	Robert Covington (21)	Nerlens Noel (10)	Michael Carter-Williams (14)	Wells Fargo Center; 15,092	1–18
20	December 6	@ Detroit	W 108–101 (OT)	Robert Covington (25)	Luc Mbah a Moute (11)	Michael Carter-Williams (15)	The Palace of Auburn Hills; 16,514	2–18
21	December 10	@ Atlanta	L 79–95	Alexey Shved (13)	Michael Carter-Williams (10)	Michael Carter-Williams (9)	Philips Arena; 11,733	2–19
22	December 12	@ Brooklyn	L 70–88	Robert Covington (20)	Carter-Williams & Covington & Noel (6)	Michael Carter-Williams (9)	Barclays Center; 16,326	2–20
23	December 13	Memphis	L 115–120 (OT)	Robert Covington (24)	Michael Carter-Williams (11)	Michael Carter-Williams (11)	Wells Fargo Center; 13,698	2–21
24	December 15	Boston	L 87–105	Nerlens Noel (19)	Nerlens Noel (8)	Michael Carter-Williams (6)	Wells Fargo Center; 12,903	2–22
25	December 19	Charlotte	L 91–109	Covington, Wroten (19)	Nerlens Noel (9)	Michael Carter-Williams (10)	Wells Fargo Center; 13,398	2–23
26	December 21	@ Orlando	W 96–88	Michael Carter-Williams (21)	Noel, Sims (12)	Tony Wroten (7)	Amway Center; 15,682	3–23
27	December 23	@ Miami	W 91–87	Michael Carter-Williams (20)	Nerlens Noel (10)	Michael Carter-Williams (5)	American Airlines Arena; 19,600	4–23
28	December 26	@ Portland	L 93–114	Tony Wroten (22)	Henry Sims (8)	Michael Carter-Williams (5)	Moda Center; 19,972	4–24
29	December 27	@ Utah	L 71–88	Tony Wroten (20)	Nerlens Noel (10)	Michael Carter-Williams (6)	EnergySolutions Arena; 18,890	4–25
30	December 30	@ Golden State	L 86–126	Henry Sims (19)	Robert Covington (9)	Michael Carter-Williams (6)	Oracle Arena; 19,596	4–26

January : 6–12 (home: 5–4; road: 1–8)

Game	Date	Team	Score	High points	High rebounds	High assists	Location Attendance	Record
31	January 2	@ Phoenix	L 96–112	Tony Wroten (28)	Luc Mbah a Moute (8)	Michael Carter-Williams (5)	US Airways Center; 16,514	4–27
32	January 3	@ LA Clippers	L 91–127	Tony Wroten (27)	Nerlens Noel (12)	Tony Wroten (7)	Staples Center; 19,060	4–28
33	January 5	Cleveland	W 95–92	Tony Wroten (20)	Furkan Aldemir (10)	Michael Carter-Williams (13)	Wells Fargo Center; 17,771	5–28
34	January 7	Milwaukee	L 77–97	K.J. McDaniels (14)	JaKarr Sampson (7)	Michael Carter-Williams (5)	Wells Fargo Center; 10,288	5–29
35	January 9	@ Brooklyn	W 90–88	Robert Covington (20)	Covington, Carter-Williams (7)	Michael Carter-Williams (8)	Barclays Center; 16,172	6–29
36	January 10	Indiana	W 93–92	Tony Wroten (20)	Sims, Noel (9)	Carter-Williams, Tony Wroten (9)	Wells Fargo Center; 17,496	7–29
37	January 13	Atlanta	L 87–105	Michael Carter-Williams (20)	Michael Carter-Williams (9)	Carter-Williams, McDaniels, Wroten (4)	Wells Fargo Center; 10,466	7–30
38	January 14	@ Toronto	L 84–100	Michael Carter-Williams (29)	Nerlens Noel, McDaniels (8)	Michael Carter-Williams (4)	Air Canada Centre; 19,800	7–31
39	January 16	New Orleans	W 96–81	Michael Carter-Williams (22)	Nerlens Noel (11)	Michael Carter-Williams (7)	Wells Fargo Center; 15,672	8–31
40	January 17	@ Detroit	L 89–107	Michael Carter-Williams (15)	Henry Sims (10)	Michael Carter-Williams (6)	The Palace of Auburn Hills; 15,496	8–32
41	January 19	@ Washington	L 76–111	Henry Sims (13)	Nerlens Noel (7)	Michael Carter-Williams (5)	Verizon Center; 19,040	8–33
42	January 21	New York	L 91–98	Michael Carter-Williams (27)	Henry Sims (12)	Michael Carter-Williams (7)	Wells Fargo Center; 13,201	8–34
43	January 23	Toronto	L 86–91	Robert Covington (18)	Nerlens Noel (14)	Michael Carter-Williams (9)	Wells Fargo Center; 13,640	8–35
44	January 24	@ Memphis	L 83–101	Jerami Grant (16)	Furkan Aldemir (11)	Michael Carter-Williams (6)	FedExForum; 17,579	8–36
45	January 26	@ New Orleans	L 74–99	K.J. McDaniels (16)	Noel, Covington (6)	Robert Covington (6)	Smoothie King Center; 16,419	8–37
46	January 28	Detroit	W 89–69	Michael Carter-Williams (14)	Michael Carter-Williams (9)	Michael Carter-Williams (10)	Wells Fargo Center; 11,213	9–37
47	January 30	Minnesota	W 103–94	Luc Mbah a Moute (18)	Michael Carter-Williams (10)	Michael Carter-Williams (10)	Wells Fargo Center; 14,333	10–37
48	January 31	@ Atlanta	L 85–91	Luc Mbah a Moute (18)	Michael Carter-Williams (10)	Michael Carter-Williams (10)	Philips Arena; 19,006	10–38

February : 3–7 (home: 3–2; road: 0–5)

Game	Date	Team	Score	High points	High rebounds	High assists	Location Attendance	Record
49	February 2	@ Cleveland	L 84–97	Covington, Grant (18)	Thompson, Grant (7)	Michael Carter-Williams (5)	Quicken Loans Arena; 20,562	10–39
50	February 3	Denver	W 105–98	Hollis Thompson (23)	Luc Mbah a Moute (10)	Michael Carter-Williams (13)	Wells Fargo Center; 10,290	11–39
51	February 6	@ Boston	L 96–107	Luc Richard Mbah a Moute (18)	Hollis Thompson (8)	Tim Frazier (10)	TD Garden; 18,322	11–40
52	February 7	Charlotte	W 89–81	Robert Covington (22)	Covington, McDaniels (8)	Tim Frazier (8)	Wells Fargo Center; 19,736	12–40
53	February 9	Golden State	L 84–89	Robert Covington (21)	Luc Richard Mbah a Moute (9)	Tim Frazier (7)	Wells Fargo Center; 16,247	12–41
All-Star Break
54	February 20	Indiana	L 95–106	Luc Richard Mbah a Moute, Grant (16)	Luc Richard Mbah a Moute (10)	Tim Frazier (7)	Wells Fargo Center; 16,777	12–42
55	February 22	@ Orlando	L 98–103	Covington, Thompson (16)	Robert Covington (9)	Tim Frazier (6)	Amway Center; 16,108	12–43
56	February 23	@ Miami	L 108–119	Hollis Thompson (22)	Nerlens Noel (7)	Ish Smith (7)	American Airlines Arena; 19,802	12–44
57	February 25	@ Milwaukee	L 88–104	Jason Richardson (16)	Nerlens Noel (8)	Isaiah Canaan (6)	BMO Harris Bradley Center; 12,763	12–45
58	February 27	Washington	W 89–81	Nerlens Noel (14)	Nerlens Noel (13)	Ish Smith (6)	Wells Fargo Center; 18,089	13–45

March : 5–12 (home: 4–6; road: 1–6)

Game	Date	Team	Score	High points	High rebounds	High assists	Location Attendance	Record
59	March 1	@ Indiana	L 74–94	Robert Covington (12)	Nerlens Noel (12)	Ish Smith (5)	Bankers Life Fieldhouse; 16,581	13–46
60	March 2	Toronto	L 103–114	Ish Smith (19)	Nerlens Noel (7)	Ish Smith (9)	Wells Fargo Center; 10,742	13–47
61	Marth 4	@ Oklahoma City	L 118–123 (OT)	Isaiah Canaan (31)	Luc Richard Mbah a Moute (14)	Isaiah Canaan (6)	Chesapeake Energy Arena; 18,203	13–48
62	March 6	Utah	L 83–89	Isaiah Canaan (16)	Thomas Robinson (12)	Ish Smith (7)	Wells Fargo Center; 15,811	13–49
63	March 7	Atlanta	W 92–84	Luc Richard Mbah a Moute (19)	Nerlens Noel (17)	Isaiah Canaan (8)	Wells Fargo Center; 15,811	14–49
64	March 11	Chicago	L 95–104 (OT)	Ish Smith (23)	Robinson, Noel (15)	Ish Smith (6)	Wells Fargo Center; 12,400	14–50
65	March 13	Sacramento	W 114–107	Robert Covington (24)	Nerlens Noel (12)	Ish Smith (9)	Wells Fargo Center; 12,331	15–50
66	March 14	Brooklyn	L 87–94	Nerlens Noel (17)	Thomas Robinson (12)	Ish Smith (5)	Wells Fargo Center; 14,865	15–51
67	March 16	@ Boston	L 89–108	Nerlens Noel (18)	Nerlens Noel (7)	Ish Smith (4)	TD Garden; 16,553	15–52
68	March 18	Detroit	W 94–83	Ish Smith (15)	Robinson, Luc Richard Mbah a Moute, Sampson (6)	Ish Smith (8)	Wells Fargo Center; 10,776	16–52
69	March 20	New York	W 97–81	Nerlens Noel (23)	Nerlens Noel (14)	Ish Smith (9)	Wells Fargo Center; 10,079	17–52
70	March 22	@ L.A. Lakers	L 87–101	Thomas Robinson (14)	Thomas Robinson (8)	Ish Smith (9)	Staples Center; 17,891	17–53
71	March 24	@ Sacramento	L 106–107	Robert Covington (21)	Nerlens Noel (10)	Ish Smith (7)	Sleep Train Arena; 16,636	17–54
72	March 25	@ Denver	W 99–85	Robert Covington (25)	Nerlens Noel (15)	Grant, Richardson (3)	Pepsi Center; 14,068	18–54
73	March 27	L.A. Clippers	L 98–119	Nerlens Noel (30)	Nerlens Noel (14)	Ish Smith (9)	Wells Fargo Center; 16,070	18–55
74	March 29	@ Cleveland	L 86–87	Robert Covington (19)	Nerlens Noel (11)	Ish Smith (7)	Quicken Loans Arena; 20,562	18–56
75	March 30	L.A. Lakers	L 111–113 (OT)	Nerlens Noel (19)	Nerlens Noel (14)	Hollis Thompson (5)	Wells Fargo Center; 13,501	18–57

April : 0–7 (home: 0–3; road: 0–4)

Game	Date	Team	Score	High points	High rebounds	High assists	Location Attendance	Record
76	April 1	@ Washington	L 93–106	Ish Smith (23)	Nerlens Noel (10)	Isaiah Canaan (6)	Verizon Center; 17,501	18–58
77	April 4	@ Charlotte	L 91–92	Covington, Smith (15)	Ish Smith (9)	Ish Smith (5)	Time Warner Cable Arena; 17,286	18–59
78	April 5	@ New York	L 91–101	Thompson, Smith (17)	Aldemir, Noel (9)	Ish Smith (7)	Madison Square Garden; 19,812	18–60
79	April 8	Washington	L 90–119	Robert Covington (27)	Thomas Robinson (12)	Ish Smith (6)	Wells Fargo Center; 12,611	18–61
80	April 11	@ Chicago	L 107–114	Robert Covington (22)	Thomas Robinson (10)	Robert Covington (5)	United Center; 22,273	18–62
81	April 13	Milwaukee	L 97–107	Robert Covington (25)	Covington, Grant (7)	Ish Smith (9)	Wells Fargo Center; 10,598	18–63
82	April 15	Miami	L 101–105	JaKarr Sampson (22)	Henry Sims (11)	JaKarr Sampson (6)	Wells Fargo Center; 14,476	18–64

2014–15 season schedule

== Roster ==
2014–15 Philadelphia 76ers roster
Players

Pos.	No.	Player	Height	Weight	DOB	From
PF	19	Furkan Aldemir	6 ft 10 in (2.08 m)	240 lb (109 kg)	1991–08–09	Turkey
PG	0	Isaiah Canaan	6 ft 0 in (1.83 m)	188 lb (85 kg)	1991–05–21	Murray State
SF	33	Robert Covington	6 ft 9 in (2.06 m)	215 lb (98 kg)	1990–12–14	Tennessee State
C	21	Joel Embiid	7 ft 0 in (2.13 m)	250 lb (113 kg)	1994–03–16	Kansas
SF	39	Jerami Grant	6 ft 8 in (2.03 m)	210 lb (95 kg)	1994–03–12	Syracuse
PF	12	Luc Mbah a Moute	6 ft 8 in (2.03 m)	230 lb (104 kg)	1986–09–09	UCLA
PF	4	Nerlens Noel	6 ft 11 in (2.11 m)	228 lb (103 kg)	1994–04–10	Kentucky
SG	23	Jason Richardson	6 ft 6 in (1.98 m)	225 lb (102 kg)	1981–01–20	Michigan State
SF	1	Glenn Robinson	6 ft 7 in (2.01 m)	222 lb (101 kg)	1994–01–08	Michigan
PF	41	Thomas Robinson	6 ft 10 in (2.08 m)	237 lb (108 kg)	1991–03–17	Kansas
SF	9	JaKarr Sampson	6 ft 9 in (2.06 m)	214 lb (97 kg)	1993–03–20	St. John's
PF	35	Henry Sims	6 ft 10 in (2.08 m)	248 lb (112 kg)	1990–03–27	Georgetown
PG	5	Ish Smith	6 ft 0 in (1.83 m)	175 lb (79 kg)	1988–07–05	Wake Forest
SG	31	Hollis Thompson	6 ft 8 in (2.03 m)	212 lb (96 kg)	1991–04–03	Georgetown
PG	8	Tony Wroten	6 ft 6 in (1.98 m)	205 lb (93 kg)	1993–04–13	Washington

Coaches
Head coach
- Brett Brown
Assistant(s)
- Chad Iske
- Billy Lange
- Lloyd Pierce
- Chris Babcock (player development)
- Eugene Burroughs (player development)
- Sean Rooks (player development)

Legend
- (DP) Unsigned draft pick
- (FA) Free agent
- (S) Suspended
- (DL) On assignment to
  D-League affiliate
- Injured

Roster
Updated: 2015–03–07

=== Roster notes ===
- Center Joel Embiid missed the entire season due to a right foot injury.
- Shooting guard Tony Wroten played 30 games but missed the rest of the season after suffering a partially torn ACL in his right knee during a game against the Atlanta Hawks on January 13, 2015.

== Player statistics ==
Legend
GP	Games played	GS	Games started	MPG	Minutes per game
FG%	Field-goal percentage	3P%	3-point field-goal percentage	FT%	Free-throw percentage
RPG	Rebounds per game	APG	Assists per game	SPG	Steals per game
BPG	Blocks per game	PPG	Points per game

=== Regular season ===
Player	GP	GS	MPG	FG%	3P%	FT%	RPG	APG	SPG	BPG	PPG
Nerlens Noel	75	71	30.8	.462		.609	8.1	1.7	1.8	1.9	9.9
JaKarr Sampson	74	32	15.3	.422	.244	.670	2.2	1.0	.5	.4	5.2
Henry Sims	73	32	19.2	.474	.182	.774	4.9	1.1	.5	.4	8.0
Hollis Thompson	71	23	25.0	.413	.401	.708	2.8	1.2	.8	.4	8.8
Robert Covington	70	49	27.9	.396	.374	.820	4.5	1.5	1.4	.4	13.5
Luc Mbah a Moute	67	61	28.6	.395	.307	.589	4.9	1.6	1.2	.3	9.9
Jerami Grant	65	11	21.2	.352	.314	.591	3.0	1.2	.6	1.0	6.3
K. J. McDaniels^{†}	52	15	25.4	.399	.293	.756	3.8	1.3	.8	1.3	9.2
Michael Carter-Williams^{†}	41	38	33.9	.380	.256	.643	6.2	7.4	1.5	.4	15.0
Furkan Aldemir	41	9	13.2	.513	.000	.481	4.3	.7	.4	.4	2.3
Tony Wroten	30	15	29.8	.403	.261	.667	2.9	5.2	1.6	.3	16.9
Ish Smith^{†}	25	14	27.1	.398	.309	.583	2.9	6.1	1.3	.2	12.0
Isaiah Canaan^{†}	22	12	25.9	.377	.364	.846	2.5	3.1	.7	.1	12.6
Thomas Robinson^{†}	22	0	18.5	.467	.000	.603	7.7	1.1	.7	.4	8.8
Brandon Davies^{†}	20	6	19.0	.412	.233	.636	3.7	1.4	.9	.2	6.3
Jason Richardson	19	15	21.9	.348	.323	.773	3.5	2.0	.7	.2	9.1
Alexey Shved^{†}	17	0	16.8	.400	.298	.842	1.3	2.7	.8	.1	9.9
Malcolm Thomas	17	0	11.4	.450	.000	.692	3.3	.4	.2	.1	2.6
Larry Drew II	12	1	18.3	.345	.154	.667	1.3	3.8	.5	.0	3.8
Glenn Robinson III^{†}	10	1	15.3	.419	.308	.500	2.5	.8	.3	.1	4.4
Chris Johnson^{†}	9	2	20.8	.317	.256	.750	2.9	.3	1.0	.6	6.0
Drew Gordon	9	0	7.9	.421	.000	.500	2.0	.2	.1	.0	1.9
Tim Frazier^{†}	6	3	28.5	.302	.273	.333	3.2	7.2	1.0	.0	5.7
JaVale McGee^{†}	6	0	10.2	.444		.500	2.2	.3	.0	.2	3.0
Malcolm Lee	1	0	2.0	.000			.0	.0	.0	.0	.0

- ^{†} Denotes player spent time with another team in the season. Stats reflect time with the 76ers only.

== Transactions ==
=== Free agents ===
==== Re-signed ====
Player	Signed	Contract	Ref.

==== Additions ====
Player	Signed	Former team	Ref.

==== Subtractions ====
Player	Reason left	Date	New team	Ref.

== Awards ==
Player	Award	Date awarded	Ref.
