= Henry Sims =

American basketball player (born 1990)

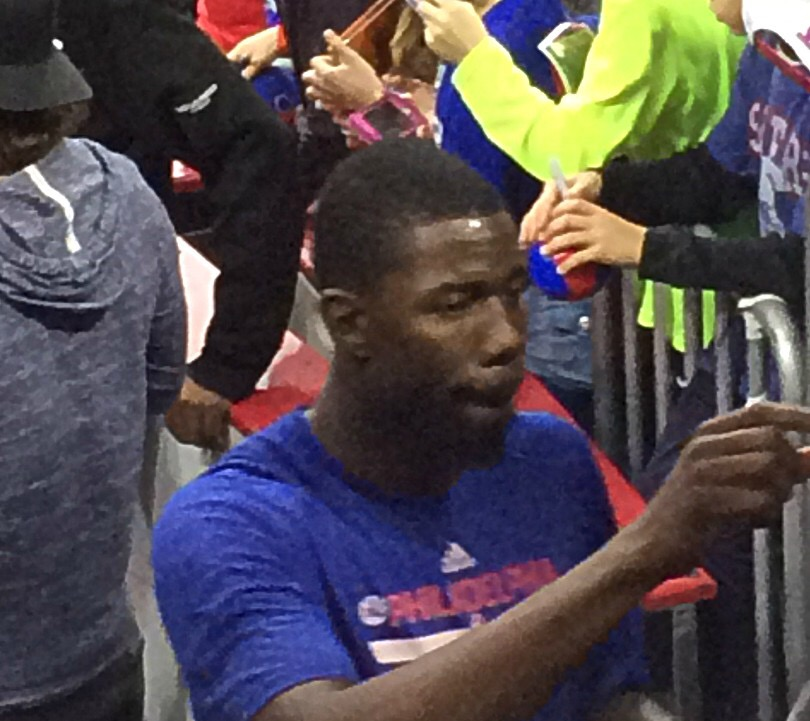
- Sims signing an autograph in 2014

No. 21 – Suke Lions
- Position: Center / power forward
- League: NBL

Personal information
- Born: March 27, 1990 (age 36) Baltimore, Maryland, U.S.
- Listed height: 6 ft 10 in (2.08 m)
- Listed weight: 247 lb (112 kg)

Career information
- High school: Mt. Saint Joseph (Baltimore, Maryland)
- College: Georgetown (2008–2012)
- NBA draft: 2012: undrafted
- Playing career: 2012–present

Career history
- 2012–2013: Erie BayHawks
- 2013: New Orleans Hornets
- 2013: Petron Blaze Boosters
- 2013–2014: Cleveland Cavaliers
- 2013: →Canton Charge
- 2014–2015: Philadelphia 76ers
- 2015–2016: Grand Rapids Drive
- 2016: Brooklyn Nets
- 2016: Salt Lake City Stars
- 2016–2017: Shanxi Brave Dragons
- 2017: Salt Lake City Stars
- 2017–2018: Vanoli Cremona
- 2018–2019: Virtus Roma
- 2019–2020: Fortitudo Bologna
- 2020–2021: Incheon Electroland Elephants
- 2021: Reggio Emilia
- 2021–2022: Universo Treviso
- 2022–2023: Ulsan Hyundai Mobis Phoebus
- 2023: Broncos de Caracas
- 2023–2024: Ohud Medina
- 2024: Amman United
- 2025: CS Maristes
- 2026–present: Suke Lions

Career highlights
- NBA Development League All-Star (2013); Fourth-team Parade All-American (2008)
- Stats at NBA.com
- Stats at Basketball Reference

Henry Sims (born March 27, 1990) is an American professional basketball player for Suke Lions of the National Basketball League (NBL). He played college basketball for the Georgetown Hoyas.

== High school career ==
Sims played for Mt. Saint Joseph High averaging 19 points and 13 rebounds as a senior. He led his team to three BCL and MIAA Championships and earned Player of the Year and All Metro honors.

== College career ==
Sims played for four years at Georgetown where he played in 104 games, starting 17, averaging 3.8 points, 2.6 rebounds. He had his best year as a senior, averaging 11.6 points, 6.0 rebounds and 3.5 assists per game connecting on 46.3 percent of his field goals.

== Professional career ==
=== Erie BayHawks (2012–2013) ===
After going undrafted in the 2012 NBA draft, Sims joined the Utah Jazz for the Orlando Summer League and Chicago Bulls for the Las Vegas Summer League. On September 10, 2012, he signed with the New York Knicks. However, he was waived on October 27. In November 2012, he was acquired by the Erie BayHawks.

On February 4, 2013, Sims was named to the Prospects All-Star roster for the 2013 NBA D-League All-Star Game.

=== New Orleans Hornets / Erie BayHawks / Petron Blaze Boosters (2013) ===
On March 3, 2013, Sims signed a 10-day contract with the New Orleans Hornets. He appeared in two games for the Hornets recording a total of four points and two rebounds. He was released by the Hornets on March 12, 2013 and returned to the BayHawks. On April 1, 2013, his contract was bought out by the BayHawks, and a day later, signed with the Petron Blaze Boosters of the Philippines.

=== Cleveland Cavaliers (2013–2014) ===
He joined the Charlotte Bobcats for the 2013 NBA Summer League. On September 30, 2013, he signed with the Cleveland Cavaliers. On December 5, 2013, he was assigned to the Canton Charge of the NBA D-League. He was recalled by the Cavaliers on December 9. On December 11, he was reassigned to Canton. He was recalled the next day.

=== Philadelphia 76ers (2014–2015) ===
On February 20, 2014, Sims was traded to the Philadelphia 76ers along with Earl Clark and two future second-round picks in exchange for Spencer Hawes. On March 22, 2014, Sims recorded 18 points and a career high 15 rebounds in an 81–91 loss to the Chicago Bulls. On April 4, 2014, Sims recorded a career high 24 points in a 111–102 win over the Boston Celtics.

=== Grand Rapids Drive (2015–2016) ===
On September 16, 2015, Sims signed with the Phoenix Suns. However, he was later waived by the Suns on October 24 after appearing in all six of the team's preseason games. On November 12, he was acquired by the Grand Rapids Drive of the NBA Development League. On November 14, he made his debut for Grand Rapids in a 113–101 win over the Delaware 87ers, recording 15 points, seven rebounds, one assist and one block in 19 minutes off the bench.

=== Brooklyn Nets (2016) ===
On March 17, 2016, Sims signed a 10-day contract with the Brooklyn Nets. Two days later, he made his debut in a 115–113 loss to the Detroit Pistons, recording 10 points, eight rebounds, one steal and one block in 20 minutes off the bench. On March 27, he signed a second 10-day contract with the Nets, and on April 6, he signed with the team for the rest of the season.

=== Salt Lake City Stars (2016) ===
On September 22, 2016, Sims signed with the Utah Jazz, but was waived on October 20 after appearing in three preseason games. On October 31, he was acquired by the Salt Lake City Stars of the NBA Development League. On December 12, Sims early terminated his contract with Salt Lake City. In 11 games, he averaged 18.2 points, 8.3 rebounds and 2.0 assists in 29.7 minutes.

=== Shanxi Brave Dragons (2016–2017) ===
On December 20, 2016, Sims signed with the Shanxi Brave Dragons of the Chinese Basketball Association.

=== Salt Lake City Stars (2017) ===
On February 27, 2017, Sims was acquired by the Salt Lake City Stars of the NBA Development League, returning to the franchise for a second stint.

=== Vanoli Cremona (2017–2018) ===
On August 15, 2017, Sims signed with Italian club Vanoli Cremona of the Lega Basket Serie A.

=== Virtus Roma (2018–2019) ===
Sims signed with Virtus Roma of the Italian second division on August 6, 2018.

=== Fortitudo Bologna (2019–2020) ===
On August 6, 2019, he has signed contract with Fortitudo Bologna of the Italian Lega Basket Serie A (LBA). Sims averaged 15.1 points and 8.9 rebounds per game. He opted out of his deal on July 7, 2020.

=== Incheon Electroland Elephants (2020–2021) ===
On July 8, 2020, Sims signed with the Incheon Electroland Elephants.

=== Reggio Emilia (2021) ===
On February 14, 2021, Sims returned to Italy and signed until the end of the season for Reggio Emilia of the Italian Lega Basket Serie A (LBA) that was also playing the FIBA Europe Cup. He left the team one match before the end of the regular season.

=== Universo Treviso (2021–2022) ===
On July 23, 2021, Sims signed with Universo Treviso.

== Career statistics ==
Legend
GP	Games played	GS	Games started	MPG	Minutes per game
FG%	Field goal percentage	3P%	3-point field goal percentage	FT%	Free throw percentage
RPG	Rebounds per game	APG	Assists per game	SPG	Steals per game
BPG	Blocks per game	PPG	Points per game	**Bold**	Career high

=== NBA ===
==== Regular season ====
Year	Team	GP	GS	MPG	FG%	3P%	FT%	RPG	APG	SPG	BPG	PPG
2012–13	New Orleans	2	0	2.5	**.667**	.000	.000	1.0	.0	.0	.0	2.0
2013–14	Cleveland	20	0	8.4	.400	.000	.571	2.8	.3	.3	.4	2.2
2013–14	Philadelphia	26	25	**27.2**	.489	.000	.766	**7.0**	**1.8**	**.9**	.5	**11.8**
2014–15	Philadelphia	**73**	**32**	19.2	.474	**.182**	.774	4.9	1.1	.5	.4	8.0
2015–16	Brooklyn	14	4	18.8	.429	.000	**.833**	5.1	.6	.6	**1.0**	6.5
Career		135	61	18.8	.471	.174	.767	5.0	1.0	.6	.5	7.6

=== PBA ===
Year	Team	GP	MPG	FG%	3P%	FT%	RPG	APG	SPG	BPG	PPG
2012–13	Petron Blaze	6	38.8	.455	.000	.721	15.7	1.0	1.0	2.3	22.8
Career		6	38.8	.455	.000	.721	15.7	1.0	1.0	2.3	22.8

== Personal life ==
Sims is the son of Brenda and Henry Sims Sr., and the step-son of Terry Awkward. He has four siblings, Myra Moore, Karigan Awkward, Brandon Awkward, and Datren Awkward. Sims is known to be single but has 1 son — Prince
