= Hamilton-Wenham Regional High School =

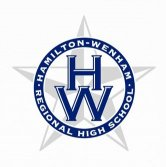

Location
- 775 Bay Road; South Hamilton, Massachusetts 01982; United States
- Coordinates: 42°37′43″N 70°50′53″W

Information
- Type: Public secondary school
- Motto: "A Passion For Learning"
- Founded: 1962
- School district: Hamilton-Wenham Regional School District
- Superintendent: Eric Tracy
- Principal: Bryan Menegoni
- Teaching staff: 37.95 (on an FTE basis)
- Grades: 9-12
- Enrollment: 448 (2024-2025)
- Student to teacher ratio: 11.81
- Colors: Navy and white
- Athletics conference: Cape Ann League (CAL)
- Nickname: Generals
- Communities served: Hamilton, Wenham
- Website: hwrhs.hwschools.net

Hamilton-Wenham Regional High School (HWRHS) is a public high school in South Hamilton, Massachusetts, United States. It is the only high school in the Hamilton-Wenham Regional School District, which has its administrative offices in Wenham, Massachusetts. The high school serves the towns of Hamilton, and Wenham. In late 2024 and through 2025 the school renovated the athletic playing fields. The fields now include a track, soccer field, baseball field, tennis courts, and ropes courses, among others.

== Notable alumni ==
- Michael Carter-Williams - National Basketball Association (NBA) player
- John Ryan Pike - Musician and founding member of Ra Ra Riot
- David McWane - Musician and founding member of Big D and the Kids Table
- David Morse - Actor
