= Michael Carter-Williams =

American basketball player (born 1991)

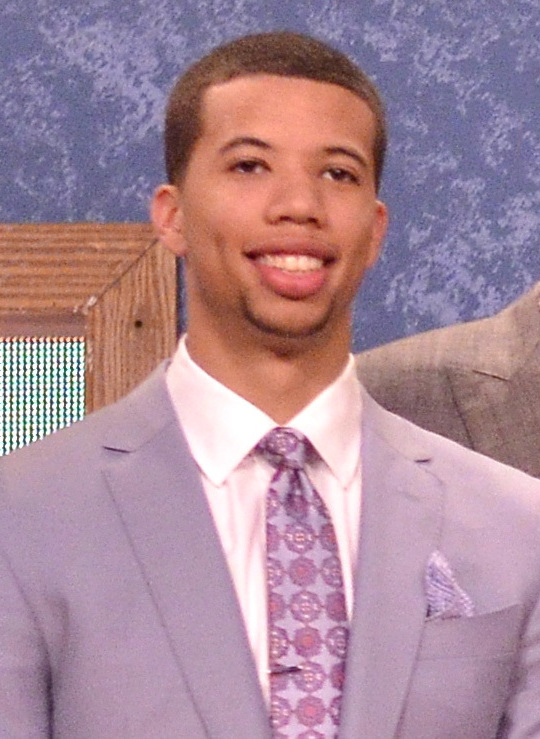
- Carter-Williams at the 2013 NBA draft

Personal information
- Born: October 10, 1991 (age 35) Hamilton, Massachusetts, U.S.
- Listed height: 6 ft 5 in (1.96 m)
- Listed weight: 190 lb (86 kg)

Career information
- High school: Hamilton-Wenham Regional (Hamilton, Massachusetts); St. Andrew's (Barrington, Rhode Island)
- College: Syracuse (2011–2013)
- NBA draft: 2013: 1st round, 11th overall pick
- Drafted by: Philadelphia 76ers
- Playing career: 2013–2023
- Position: Point guard / shooting guard
- Number: 1, 5, 7, 10, 11

Career history
- 2013–2015: Philadelphia 76ers
- 2015–2016: Milwaukee Bucks
- 2016–2017: Chicago Bulls
- 2017–2018: Charlotte Hornets
- 2018–2019: Houston Rockets
- 2019–2023: Orlando Magic
- 2023: Mexico City Capitanes

Career highlights
- NBA Rookie of the Year (2014); NBA All-Rookie First Team (2014); AP Honorable mention All-American (2013); Second-team All-Big East (2013); Big East Most Improved Player (2013); McDonald's All-American (2011)

Career NBA statistics
- Points: 4,040 (10.2 ppg)
- Rebounds: 1,718 (4.3 rpg)
- Assists: 1,708 (4.3 apg)
- Stats at NBA.com
- Stats at Basketball Reference

Michael Carter-Williams (born October 10, 1991) is an American former professional basketball player. He was drafted in the first round with the 11th overall pick in the 2013 NBA draft by the Philadelphia 76ers, after playing college basketball for the Syracuse Orange. He was named NBA Rookie of the Year in 2014, and he has also played for the Milwaukee Bucks, Chicago Bulls, Charlotte Hornets, Houston Rockets, and Orlando Magic.

== High school career ==
Carter-Williams attended Hamilton-Wenham Regional High School in Hamilton, Massachusetts as a freshman. He was 5'9" as a freshman, and led his team and conference in scoring with 20 points per game and a league championship.

In 2008, Carter-Williams transferred to the boarding school St. Andrew's in Barrington, Rhode Island where he lived in a dormitory during his final three years of high school. In his three years as a starter, he averaged 25.4 points per game. As a senior, he averaged 23.2 points, 8.3 rebounds and 5.5 assists per game.

After his sophomore season in high school, Carter-Williams committed to attend Syracuse where he played on their basketball team. He visited colleges in August after his sophomore year in 2009 and received scholarship offers from other schools such as Providence, Virginia Tech, Florida State, Virginia, Notre Dame, and Clemson.

Later in his high school career, he played on the same AAU team as future 76ers' teammate, Nerlens Noel.

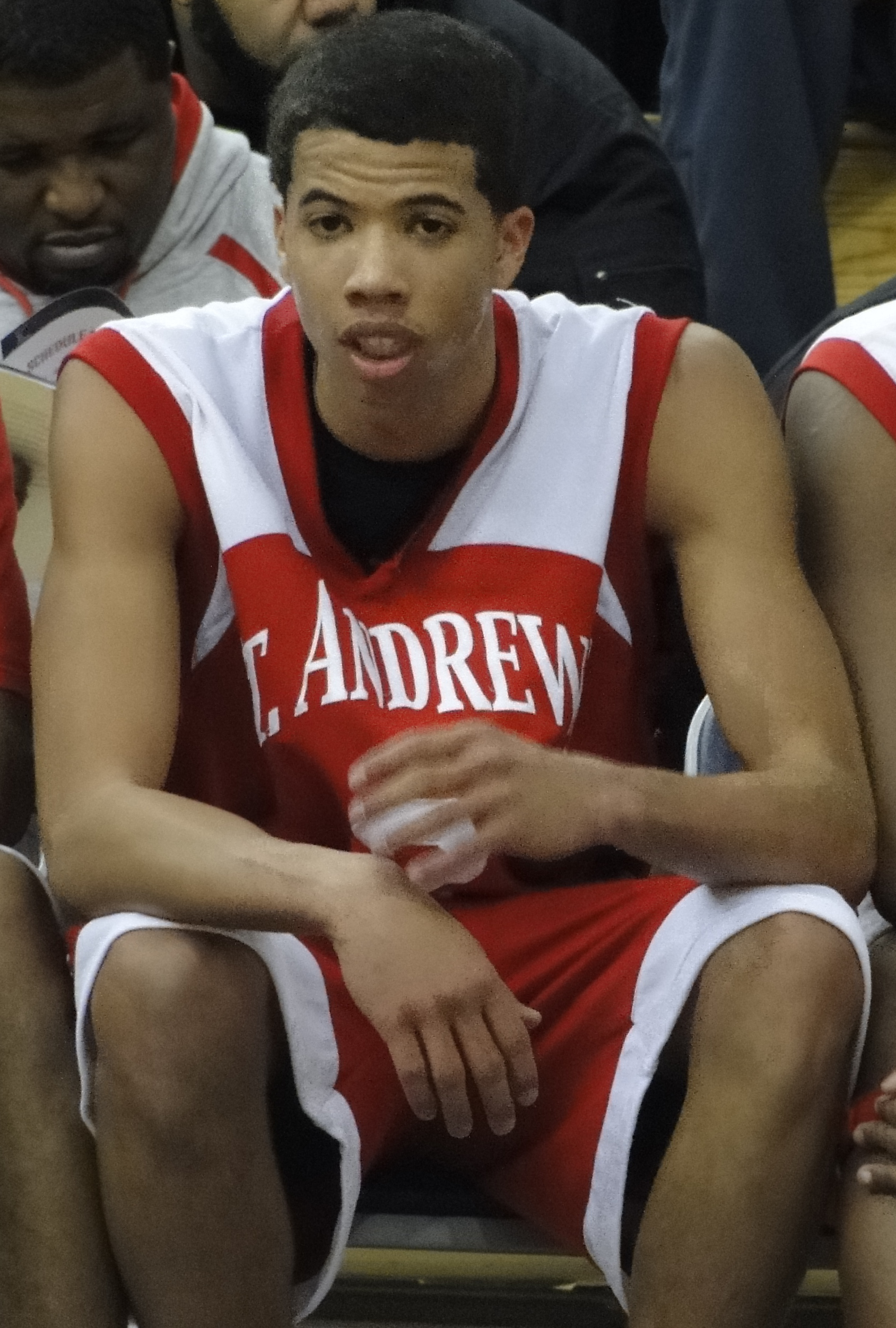
Carter-Williams in 2010

College recruiting
Name	Hometown	School	Height	Weight	Commit date
Michael Carter-Williams; SG	Hamilton, Massachusetts	St. Andrew's	6 ft 5 in (1.96 m)	175 lb (79 kg)	Nov 1, 2009
Michael Carter-Williams; SG	Recruit ratings: Scout: Rivals: (97)				
Overall recruit ranking: Scout: 9 (SG) Rivals: 29, 7 (SG) ESPN: 21, 4 (SG), 6 (East)
Note: In many cases, Scout, Rivals, 247Sports, On3, and ESPN may conflict in their listings of height and weight.; In these cases, the average was taken. ESPN grades are on a 100-point scale.; Sources: "Syracuse 2011 Basketball Commitments". Rivals.; "2011 Syracuse Basketball Commits". Scout.; "Syracuse Orange 2011 Player Commits". ESPN.; "Scout.com Team Recruiting Rankings". Scout.; "2011 Team Ranking". Rivals.

== College career ==
Carter-Williams had a subdued freshman season at Syracuse in 2011–12 as he played behind Scoop Jardine, Brandon Triche and Dion Waiters. The season began about how Carter-Williams envisioned with him coming off the bench but solidly in Jim Boeheim's rotation. That niche role gradually eroded, however, as Jardine and Triche solidified their starting roles and Waiters emerged as the best sixth man in the nation. It was a difficult first season for him in which he did not play in games and received sporadic minutes in others. He finished the season averaging 2.7 points, 2.1 rebounds and 10.3 minutes in 26 total games (no starts).

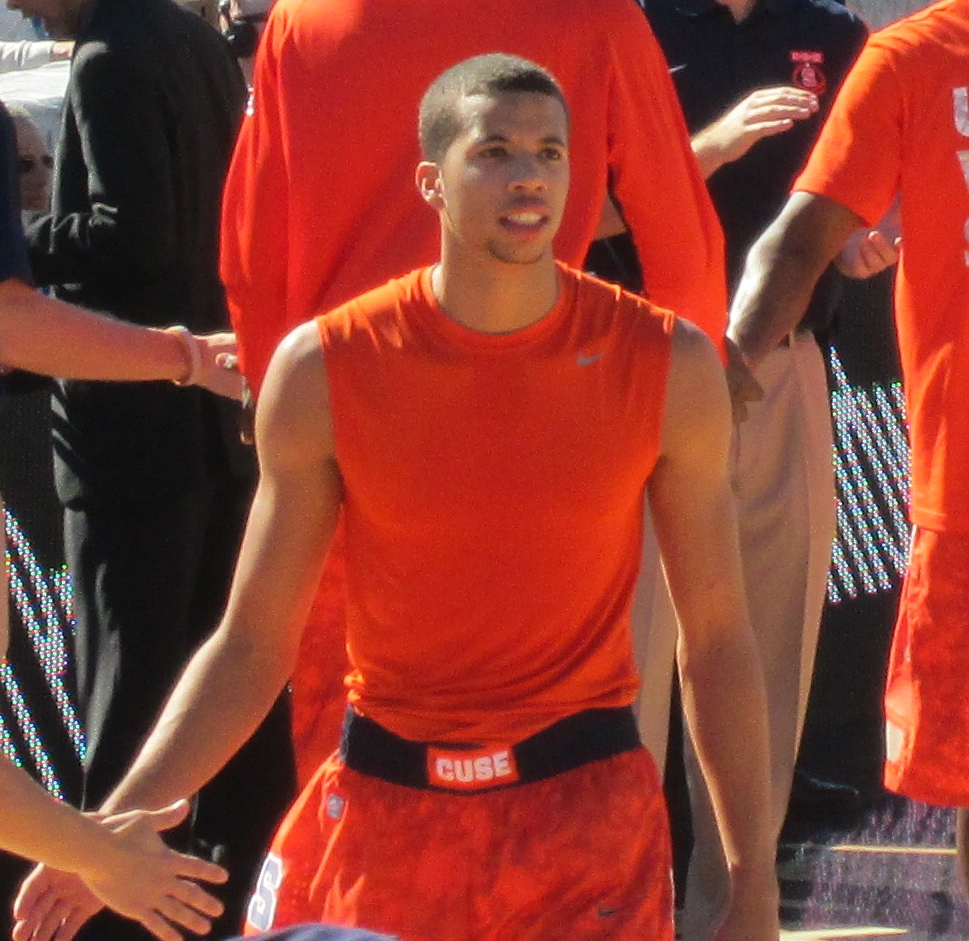
Carter-Williams warming up with Syracuse ahead of their game on the USS Midway

During the 2012 offseason, Carter-Williams worked on his game, from lifting weights daily and drinking protein shakes to try to get stronger, to doing shooting drills every morning and improving his nutrition. His hard work over the offseason translated into Carter-Williams' emergence as a breakout star for Syracuse and one of the best point guards in the nation during the 2012–13 season. He went on to start his first game for Syracuse in the season opener and kept his starting role for the entire season, starting all 40 games. He finished his sophomore season with averages of 11.9 points, 5.0 rebounds, 7.3 assists and 2.7 steals in 35.2 minutes per game. On March 28, 2013, he scored a career-high 24 points as he led Syracuse past the No. 1 seed Indiana Hoosiers 61–50 in the NCAA's East Region semi-finals as they advanced to the NCAA's Elite Eight. At the conclusion of the season, he earned Associated Press honorable mention All-American honors, as well as second-team All-Big East honors.

On April 10, 2013, Carter-Williams declared for the NBA draft, forgoing his final two years of college eligibility.

== Professional career ==
=== Philadelphia 76ers (2013–2015) ===
==== 2013–14 season: Rookie of the Year ====
Many draft outlooks ranked Carter-Williams as a top point guard prospect and a top ten prospect overall. Carter-Williams was selected 11th overall in the 2013 NBA draft by the Philadelphia 76ers. Carter-Williams, along with Nerlens Noel, were both officially signed by the 76ers on September 24, 2013. On October 30, 2013, in his NBA debut, he recorded 22 points, 12 assists, 7 rebounds, and 9 steals (the most steals ever made by a rookie on debut) in a 114–110 win over the defending champion Miami Heat. Less than a week later, he had a 26-point, 10 assist performance in a 107–104 win over the Chicago Bulls. He was subsequently named the Player of the Week in only his first week in the NBA, a feat last achieved by Shaquille O'Neal in 1992. On November 9, 2013, Carter-Williams recorded a career-high 13 assists to go with 21 points in a 127–125 double overtime loss to Cleveland.

On December 3, 2013, he recorded his first triple-double with 27 points, 12 rebounds, and 10 assists in 47 minutes in a 126–125 double-overtime victory over the Orlando Magic. Rookie Victor Oladipo of the Magic also recorded his first career triple-double in the same game, marking the first and only time in NBA history that two rookies have recorded triple-doubles in the same game. The last time that two players had recorded their first career triple-doubles in the same game was when Detroit Pistons Donnie Butcher and Ray Scott did it on March 14, 1964 (they were not rookies). It was also the first time that two opponents had recorded triple-doubles in the same game since Caron Butler and Baron Davis had done so on November 23, 2007.

Carter-Williams was named the Eastern Conference Rookie of the Month for games played in October and November 2013. He led all rookies in scoring (17.2 ppg), assists (7.3 apg), steals (2.92 spg) and minutes (36.2 mpg) over this stretch. He was again named Eastern Conference Rookie of the Month for games of January 2014. During January he led all rookies in scoring (16.5 ppg), and ranked second in rebounding (5.6 rpg), assists (5.6 apg) and minutes (33.3 mpg). During the month of February, Carter-Williams participated in the BBVA Rising Stars Challenge and the Taco Bell Skills Challenge.

On March 10, 2014, Carter-Williams recorded his second career triple-double with 23 points, 10 assists, and 13 rebounds in a 123–110 loss to the New York Knicks. He became the first rookie in 76ers franchise history to record two triple doubles in a season. Carter-Williams was again named the Eastern Conference Rookie of the month for March 2014. He is the first rookie in 76ers franchise history to be named conference rookie of the month three times. On April 14, 2014, Carter-Williams recorded 21 points and a career high 14 rebounds. The 14 rebounds were the most recorded by a point guard in the 2013–14 NBA season.

Carter-Williams finished his rookie season with averages of 16.7 ppg, 6.2 rpg, and 6.3 apg. At the time, he was one of only three players in NBA history to average 16 points, 6 rebounds and 6 assists in a rookie season, the other players being Oscar Robertson and Magic Johnson, though Luka Dončić later achieved it. On May 5, 2014, he was named the 2014 NBA Rookie of the Year, becoming the first rookie drafted 10th or later to win the award since Mark Jackson in 1987.

==== 2014–15 season ====
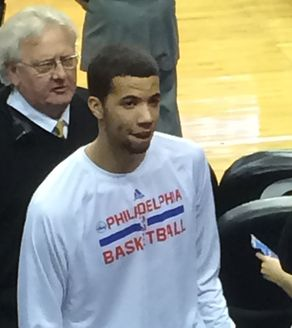
Carter-Williams with the 76ers in 2014

After undergoing shoulder surgery in May 2014, Carter-Williams subsequently missed the 2014 NBA Summer League and training camp, before later being ruled out for the start of the 2014–15 regular season as well. Despite the injury, the 76ers exercised their third-year team option on Carter-Williams' rookie scale contract on October 31, extending the contract through the 2015–16 season.

Carter-Williams returned from injury on November 13 to make his season debut against the Dallas Mavericks. In 30 minutes off the bench, he recorded a team-high 19 points as well as 8 rebounds and 5 assists in a 123–70 loss. On November 29, 2014, Carter-Williams recorded his third career triple-double with 18 points, 10 rebounds, and a career high 16 assists in a 110–103 loss to the Dallas Mavericks. He went on to record his fourth career triple-double on December 13, 2014, with 16 points, 11 rebounds and 11 assists in a 120–115 overtime loss to the Memphis Grizzles. On January 30, he recorded his fifth career triple-double with 17 points, 10 rebounds and 10 assists in a 103–94 win over the Minnesota Timberwolves.

=== Milwaukee Bucks (2015–2016) ===
On February 19, 2015, Carter-Williams was traded to the Milwaukee Bucks in a three-team deal involving the Phoenix Suns. As part of the deal, Milwaukee also received Tyler Ennis and Miles Plumlee from Phoenix, while Phoenix received Brandon Knight from Milwaukee, and Philadelphia received a future first-round pick from Phoenix via the Los Angeles Lakers. On February 25, he made his debut for the Bucks, recording 7 points and 8 assists as a starter in a 104–88 win over his former team the Philadelphia 76ers. On April 8, he scored a season-high 30 points in a loss to the Cleveland Cavaliers. Five days later, he matched his season-high with 30 points in his first game back in Philadelphia since being traded to lead the Bucks to a 107–97 win over the 76ers.

Carter-Williams began the 2015–16 season strongly for the Bucks, averaging 12.8 points, 6.8 assists, 4.5 rebounds, 1.8 steals and 1.0 blocks over the first four games. He subsequently missed the next five games with an ankle injury, returning to action on November 14. He started in his first 11 games of the season before being moved to the bench on November 29 in favor of Jerryd Bayless after a string of poor performances – between November 14 and November 27, he averaged much lower numbers with 9.1 points, 3.7 assists, and 2.4 rebounds per game. On December 5, he had his best game since the season opener, recording 20 points, 5 assists and 3 rebounds off the bench in a 106–91 win over the New York Knicks. On January 8, he recorded 15 points and a season-high 12 rebounds in a 96–95 win over the Dallas Mavericks. On February 1, he recorded 18 points and a season-high 13 assists in a loss to the Sacramento Kings. On March 7, he was ruled out for the rest of the season with a torn labrum in his left hip.

=== Chicago Bulls (2016–2017) ===
On October 17, 2016, Carter-Williams was traded to the Chicago Bulls in exchange for Tony Snell. He made his debut for the Bulls in their season opener on October 27, 2016, recording five points, six rebounds and three assists off the bench in a 105–99 win over the Boston Celtics. On November 1, 2016, he was ruled out for four to six weeks after he sustained a bone bruise with no ligament damage to his knee, as well as a left wrist sprain. He returned to the Bulls lineup on December 26, 2016, and finished with one point (0-for-5 from the field) in 19 minutes against the Indiana Pacers. On February 3, 2017, he had a season-best game with 23 points, nine rebounds and six assists as a starter in a 121–117 loss to the Houston Rockets.

=== Charlotte Hornets (2017–2018) ===
On July 7, 2017, Carter-Williams signed with the Charlotte Hornets. On March 9, 2018, he was ruled out for the rest of the season with a posterior labral tear in his left shoulder.

=== Houston Rockets (2018–2019) ===
On July 6, 2018, Carter-Williams signed with the Houston Rockets. On December 19, 2018, in a 136–118 win over the Washington Wizards, Carter-Williams hit a 3-pointer late in the fourth quarter to give the Rockets an NBA-record 26th 3-pointer for the game. On January 7, 2019, Carter-Williams was traded, along with cash considerations, to the Chicago Bulls in exchange for a 2020 protected second-round pick. He was immediately waived by the Bulls upon being acquired.

=== Orlando Magic (2019–2023) ===
On March 15, 2019, Carter-Williams signed a 10-day contract with the Orlando Magic. He signed a second 10-day contract on March 25. That same day, he recorded a season-high 15 points in a 119–98 win over his former team, the Philadelphia 76ers. On April 4, 2019, the Magic signed Carter-Williams for the remainder of the season.

On July 10, 2019, Carter-Williams re-signed with the Magic on a one-year contract.

On November 24, 2020, Carter-Williams re-signed with the Magic on a 2-year, $6.6 million contract.

On August 23, 2021, Carter-Williams underwent surgery on his left ankle and was ruled out for the start of the 2021–22 season. On February 10, 2022, he was waived without playing a game during the season for the Magic.

On February 26, 2023, Carter-Williams re-signed with the Magic.

=== Mexico City Capitanes (2023) ===
On October 30, 2023, Carter-Williams signed with the Mexico City Capitanes of the NBA G League. On December 26, 2023, Carter-Williams parted ways with Capitanes for personal reasons.

In October 2024, Carter-Williams mentioned he was retired in an interview.

== Career statistics ==
Legend
GP	Games played	GS	Games started	MPG	Minutes per game
FG%	Field goal percentage	3P%	3-point field goal percentage	FT%	Free throw percentage
RPG	Rebounds per game	APG	Assists per game	SPG	Steals per game
BPG	Blocks per game	PPG	Points per game	**Bold**	Career high

=== NBA ===
==== Regular season ====
Year	Team	GP	GS	MPG	FG%	3P%	FT%	RPG	APG	SPG	BPG	PPG
2013–14	Philadelphia	**70**	**70**	**34.5**	.405	.264	.703	**6.2**	6.3	1.9	.6	**16.7**
2014–15	Philadelphia	41	38	33.9	.380	.256	.643	**6.2**	**7.4**	1.5	.4	15.0
2014–15	Milwaukee	25	25	30.3	.429	.143	.780	4.0	5.6	**2.0**	.5	14.1
2015–16	Milwaukee	54	37	30.5	**.452**	.273	.654	5.1	5.2	1.5	**.8**	11.5
2016–17	Chicago	45	19	18.8	.366	.234	.753	3.4	2.5	.8	.5	6.6
2017–18	Charlotte	52	2	16.1	.332	.237	.820	2.7	2.2	.8	.4	4.6
2018–19	Houston	16	1	9.1	.410	**.368**	.462	.8	1.3	.6	.4	4.3
2018–19	Orlando	12	0	18.9	.339	.158	.741	4.8	4.1	.9	**.8**	5.4
2019–20	Orlando	45	0	18.5	.427	.293	**.832**	3.3	2.4	1.1	.5	7.2
2020–21	Orlando	31	25	25.8	.389	.246	.613	4.5	4.2	.8	.5	8.8
2022–23	Orlando	4	0	11.0	.429	.333	.571	1.3	1.8	.3	.3	4.3
Career		395	217	25.2	.402	.256	.705	4.3	4.3	1.3	.5	10.2

==== Playoffs ====
Year	Team	GP	GS	MPG	FG%	3P%	FT%	RPG	APG	SPG	BPG	PPG
2015	Milwaukee	**6**	**6**	**31.8**	**.423**	.000	.583	**4.5**	**4.8**	**1.2**	**1.0**	**12.2**
2017	Chicago	5	0	10.6	.400	.000	.500	.8	1.2	.4	.2	2.8
2019	Orlando	5	0	18.4	.387	**.250**	**.875**	4.0	2.4	.6	.0	6.6
Career		16	6	21.0	.411	.143	.667	3.2	2.9	.8	.4	7.5

=== College ===
Year	Team	GP	GS	MPG	FG%	3P%	FT%	RPG	APG	SPG	BPG	PPG
2011–12	Syracuse	26	0	10.3	**.431**	**.389**	.565	1.5	2.1	.8	.3	2.7
2012–13	Syracuse	**40**	**40**	**35.2**	.393	.294	**.694**	**5.0**	**7.3**	**2.7**	**.5**	**11.9**
Career		66	40	25.4	.398	.307	.679	3.6	5.2	2.0	.4	8.2

== Post-playing career ==
Carter-Williams formed NFT company DeFi Crypto Connections with partners Brooks Brown and Austin Greishober in 2021.

Carter-Williams is also involved with youth athletics organization MCW Starz, which was founded by his mother Mandy and step-father Zach, as well as a sports trading card project he founded with MLB prospect Blaze Jordan.

In January 2025, Carter-Williams joined ESPN as a men's college basketball studio and game analyst. He appears on the ACC Network show Nothing But Net.

In May 2025, Carter-Williams fought in a charity boxing event and won by decision. He has stated plans to continue fighting and potentially pursue a career in the sport.

== Personal life ==
Carter-Williams is the son of Earl Williams and Amanda (Mandy) Carter, and step-son of Zach Zegarowski (second husband of his mother Mandy) and Rosa Williams (second wife of his father Earl). He has a younger sister, Masey, and three younger half-brothers: Marcus Zegarowski, Max, and Adrian. His parents met while the two were both basketball players at Salem State University in Salem, Massachusetts.

== See also ==
- List of National Basketball Association players with most steals in a game
