= 2013–14 New York Knicks season =

Season of National Basketball Association team the New York Knicks

- Head coach: Mike Woodson
- President: Phil Jackson (after March 18, 2014)
- General manager: Steve Mills
- Owners: Madison Square Garden, Inc.
- Arena: Madison Square Garden

Results
- Record: 37–45 (.451)
- Place: Division: 3rd (Atlantic); Conference: 9th (Eastern)
- Playoff finish: Did not qualify
- Stats at Basketball Reference

Local media
- Television: MSG Network; MSG Plus; WWOR
- Radio: ESPN

The 2013–14 New York Knicks season was the 68th season of the franchise in the National Basketball Association (NBA). The team failed to make the playoffs for the first time since 2010, leaving the 2012–13 season to be the last time the team would qualify for the postseason until the 2020–21 season.

== Key dates ==
- January 24: Carmelo Anthony scored a career and franchise-high 62 points along with 13 rebounds in a 125–96 win against the Charlotte Bobcats.

== Draft picks ==
Round	Pick	Player	Position	Nationality	College
1	24	Tim Hardaway Jr.	SG	(United States) American	Michigan

== Roster ==
2013–14 New York Knicks roster
Players

Pos.	No.	Player	Height	Weight	DOB	From
C	45	Cole Aldrich	6 ft 11 in (2.11 m)	245 lb (111 kg)	1988–10–31	Kansas
F	7	Carmelo Anthony	6 ft 8 in (2.03 m)	235 lb (107 kg)	1984–05–29	Syracuse
F/C	77	Andrea Bargnani	7 ft 0 in (2.13 m)	250 lb (113 kg)	1985–08–26	Italy
G	26	Shannon Brown	6 ft 4 in (1.93 m)	210 lb (95 kg)	1985–11–29	Michigan State
C	6	Tyson Chandler	7 ft 1 in (2.16 m)	240 lb (109 kg)	1982–10–02	Dominguez HS (CA)
G	2	Raymond Felton	6 ft 1 in (1.85 m)	205 lb (93 kg)	1984–06–26	North Carolina
G	5	Tim Hardaway Jr.	6 ft 6 in (1.98 m)	205 lb (93 kg)	1992–03–16	Michigan
F	3	Kenyon Martin	6 ft 9 in (2.06 m)	225 lb (102 kg)	1977–12–30	Cincinnati
G/F	23	Toure' Murry	6 ft 5 in (1.96 m)	195 lb (88 kg)	1989–11–08	Wichita State
F		Lamar Odom	6 ft 10 in (2.08 m)	230 lb (104 kg)	1979–11–06	Rhode Island
G	9	Pablo Prigioni	6 ft 3 in (1.91 m)	185 lb (84 kg)	1977–05–17	Argentina
G	21	Iman Shumpert	6 ft 5 in (1.96 m)	220 lb (100 kg)	1990–06–26	Georgia Tech
G	8	J. R. Smith	6 ft 6 in (1.98 m)	220 lb (100 kg)	1985–09–09	St. Benedict's Prep (NJ)
F/C	1	Amar'e Stoudemire	6 ft 11 in (2.11 m)	245 lb (111 kg)	1982–11–16	Cypress Creek HS (FL)
F	4	Jeremy Tyler	6 ft 10 in (2.08 m)	250 lb (113 kg)	1991–06–21	San Diego HS (CA)

Coaches
Head coach
- Mike Woodson
Assistant(s)
- Herb Williams
- Darrell Walker
- Jim Todd

Legend
- (DP) Unsigned draft pick
- (FA) Free agent
- (S) Suspended
- (DL) On assignment to D-League affiliate
- Injured

Roster
Updated: 2014–04–16

== Pre-season ==
2013 pre-season game log
Total: 2–5 (Home: 0–1; Road: 2–4)
Pre-season: 2–5 (home: 0–1; road: 2–4)

Game	Date	Team	Score	High points	High rebounds	High assists	Location Attendance	Record
1	October 9	@ Boston	W 103–102	Iman Shumpert (18)	Chandler & Aldrich (5)	Raymond Felton (5)	Dunkin' Donuts Center; 10,404	1–0
2	October 11	@ Toronto	L 91–100	Carmelo Anthony (24)	Iman Shumpert (9)	Beno Udrih (5)	Air Canada Centre; 15,357	1–1
3	October 12	@ Boston	L 81–111	Ike Diogu (21)	Ike Diogu (8)	Chris Douglas-Roberts (3)	Verizon Wireless Arena; 9,391	1–2
4	October 17	@ Washington	W 98–89	Carmelo Anthony (22)	Ike Diogu (8)	Carmelo Anthony (4)	Baltimore Arena; 12,376	2–2
5	October 21	@ Toronto	L 120–123 (2OT)	Beno Udrih (19)	Carmelo Anthony (8)	Beno Udrih (7)	Air Canada Centre; 15,701	2–3
6	October 23	@ Milwaukee	L 95–105	Carmelo Anthony (22)	Carmelo Anthony (9)	Carmelo Anthony (7)	Resch Center; 5,609	2–4
7	October 25	Charlotte	L 83–85	Iman Shumpert (16)	Tyson Chandler (9)	Raymond Felton (5)	Madison Square Garden; 19,812	2–5

2013–14 season schedule

== Regular season ==
=== Standings ===
Atlantic Division	W	L	PCT	GB	Home	Road	Div	GP
y-Toronto Raptors	48	34	.585	–	26‍–‍15	22‍–‍19	11–5	82
x-Brooklyn Nets	44	38	.537	4.0	28‍–‍13	16‍–‍25	9–7	82
New York Knicks	37	45	.451	11.0	19‍–‍22	18‍–‍23	10–6	82
Boston Celtics	25	57	.305	23.0	16‍–‍25	9‍–‍32	5–11	82
Philadelphia 76ers	19	63	.232	29.0	10‍–‍31	9‍–‍32	5–11	82

Eastern Conference
#	Team	W	L	PCT	GB	GP
1	c-Indiana Pacers *	56	26	.683	–	82
2	y-Miami Heat *	54	28	.659	2.0	82
3	y-Toronto Raptors *	48	34	.585	8.0	82
4	x-Chicago Bulls	48	34	.585	8.0	82
5	x-Washington Wizards	44	38	.537	12.0	82
6	x-Brooklyn Nets	44	38	.537	12.0	82
7	x-Charlotte Bobcats	43	39	.524	13.0	82
8	x-Atlanta Hawks	38	44	.463	18.0	82
9	New York Knicks	37	45	.451	19.0	82
10	Cleveland Cavaliers	33	49	.402	23.0	82
11	Detroit Pistons	29	53	.354	27.0	82
12	Boston Celtics	25	57	.305	31.0	82
13	Orlando Magic	23	59	.280	33.0	82
14	Philadelphia 76ers	19	63	.232	37.0	82
15	Milwaukee Bucks	15	67	.183	41.0	82

=== Game log ===
2013–14 game log
Total: 37–45 (Home: 19–22; Road: 18–23)
October: 1–1 (home: 1–0; road: 0–1)

Game	Date	Team	Score	High points	High rebounds	High assists	Location Attendance	Record
1	October 30	Milwaukee	W 90–83	Carmelo Anthony (19)	Carmelo Anthony (10)	Pablo Prigioni (5)	Madison Square Garden; 19,812	1–0
2	October 31	@ Chicago	L 81–82	Carmelo Anthony (22)	Tyson Chandler (19)	Anthony & Felton (6)	United Center; 22,022	1–1

November : 2–11 (home: 0–6; road: 2–5)

Game	Date	Team	Score	High points	High rebounds	High assists	Location Attendance	Record
3	November 3	Minnesota	L 100–109	Carmelo Anthony (22)	Carmelo Anthony (17)	Raymond Felton (12)	Madison Square Garden; 19,812	1–2
4	November 5	Charlotte	L 97–102	Carmelo Anthony (32)	Felton & World Peace (6)	Anthony, Felton, Shumpert (2)	Madison Square Garden; 19,812	1–3
5	November 8	@ Charlotte	W 101–91	Carmelo Anthony (28)	Anthony & Bargnani (8)	Carmelo Anthony (6)	Time Warner Cable Arena; 16,465	2–3
6	November 10	San Antonio	L 89–120	Anthony & Bargnani (16)	Carmelo Anthony (8)	Smith, World Peace, Aldrich (3)	Madison Square Garden; 19,812	2–4
7	November 13	@ Atlanta	W 95–91	Carmelo Anthony (25)	Andrea Bargnani (11)	Iman Shumpert (9)	Philips Arena; 15,057	3–4
8	November 14	Houston	L 106–109	Carmelo Anthony (45)	Carmelo Anthony (10)	Raymond Felton (7)	Madison Square Garden; 19,812	3–5
9	November 16	Atlanta	L 90–110	Carmelo Anthony (23)	Carmelo Anthony (12)	Raymond Felton (5)	Madison Square Garden; 19,812	3–6
10	November 19	@ Detroit	L 86–92	Carmelo Anthony (25)	Anthony, Martin (7)	Pablo Prigioni (5)	Palace of Auburn Hills; 13,213	3–7
11	November 20	Indiana	L 96–103 (OT)	Carmelo Anthony (30)	Carmelo Anthony (18)	Beno Udrih (4)	Madison Square Garden; 19,812	3–8
12	November 23	@ Washington	L 89–98	Carmelo Anthony (23)	Carmelo Anthony (12)	Andrea Bargnani (5)	Verizon Center; 18,089	3–9
13	November 25	@ Portland	L 91–102	Carmelo Anthony (34)	Carmelo Anthony (15)	Kenyon Martin (6)	Moda Center; 19,939	3–10
14	November 27	@ L.A. Clippers	L 80–93	Carmelo Anthony (27)	Andrea Bargnani (10)	Raymond Felton (7)	Staples Center; 19,270	3–11
15	November 29	@ Denver	L 95–97	Carmelo Anthony (27)	Carmelo Anthony (7)	Raymond Felton (7)	Pepsi Center; 19,155	3–12

December : 6–9 (home: 3–6; road: 3–3)

Game	Date	Team	Score	High points	High rebounds	High assists	Location Attendance	Record
16	December 1	New Orleans	L 99–103	Carmelo Anthony (23)	Carmelo Anthony (10)	Raymond Felton (8)	Madison Square Garden; 19,812	3–13
17	December 5	@ Brooklyn	W 113–83	Carmelo Anthony (19)	Carmelo Anthony (10)	Carmelo Anthony (6)	Barclays Center; 17,732	4–13
18	December 6	Orlando	W 121–83	Carmelo Anthony (20)	Carmelo Anthony (11)	Pablo Prigioni (6)	Madison Square Garden; 19,812	5–13
19	December 8	Boston	L 73–114	Carmelo Anthony (19)	Carmelo Anthony (5)	Pablo Prigioni (4)	Madison Square Garden; 19,812	5–14
20	December 10	@ Cleveland	L 94–109	Carmelo Anthony (29)	Carmelo Anthony (8)	Pablo Prigioni (9)	Quicken Loans Arena; 14,580	5–15
21	December 11	Chicago	W 83–78	Carmelo Anthony (30)	Carmelo Anthony (10)	Carmelo Anthony (4)	Madison Square Garden; 19,812	6–15
22	December 13	@ Boston	L 86–90	Carmelo Anthony (26)	Kenyon Martin (7)	Pablo Prigioni (8)	TD Garden; 17,479	6–16
23	December 14	Atlanta	W 111–106	Carmelo Anthony (35)	Carmelo Anthony (6)	Pablo Prigioni (6)	Madison Square Garden; 19,812	7–16
24	December 16	Washington	L 101–102	Carmelo Anthony (32)	Iman Shumpert (9)	J. R. Smith (6)	Madison Square Garden; 19,812	7–17
25	December 18	@ Milwaukee	W 107–101 (2OT)	Carmelo Anthony (32)	Andrea Bargnani (10)	J. R. Smith (6)	BMO Harris Bradley Center; 11,869	8–17
26	December 21	Memphis	L 87–95	Carmelo Anthony (30)	Carmelo Anthony (7)	J. R. Smith (7)	Madison Square Garden; 19,812	8–18
27	December 23	@ Orlando	W 103–98	Carmelo Anthony (19)	Tyson Chandler (13)	Beno Udrih (6)	Amway Center; 15,105	9–18
28	December 25	Oklahoma City	L 94–123	Amar'e Stoudemire (22)	Tyson Chandler (9)	Beno Udrih (6)	Madison Square Garden; 19,812	9–19
29	December 27	Toronto	L 83–95	Andrea Bargnani (18)	Andrea Bargnani (12)	Beno Udrih (10)	Madison Square Garden; 19,812	9–20
30	December 28	@ Toronto	L 100–115	Amar'e Stoudemire (23)	Amar'e Stoudemire (9)	J.R. Smith, Toure Murry (6)	Air Canada Centre; 19,800	9–21

January : 10–6 (home: 7–3; road: 3–3)

Game	Date	Team	Score	High points	High rebounds	High assists	Location Attendance	Record
31	January 2	@ San Antonio	W 105–101	Carmelo Anthony, Iman Shumpert (27)	Carmelo Anthony (12)	Beno Udrih (7)	AT&T Center; 18,581	10–21
32	January 3	@ Houston	L 100–102	Iman Shumpert (26)	Tyson Chandler (11)	Beno Udrih (7)	Toyota Center; 18,304	10–22
33	January 5	@ Dallas	W 92–80	Carmelo Anthony (19)	three players (7)	Beno Udrih (8)	American Airlines Center; 19,892	11–22
34	January 7	Detroit	W 89–85	Carmelo Anthony (34)	Andrea Bargnani (11)	Raymond Felton (6)	Madison Square Garden; 19,812	12–22
35	January 9	Miami	W 102–92	Carmelo Anthony (29)	Amar'e Stoudemire (11)	Raymond Felton (14)	Madison Square Garden; 19,812	13–22
36	January 11	@ Philadelphia	W 102–92	Amar'e Stoudemire (21)	Carmelo Anthony (9)	Carmelo Anthony (7)	Wells Fargo Center; 16,278	14–22
37	January 13	Phoenix	W 98–96	Carmelo Anthony (29)	Carmelo Anthony (16)	Carmelo Anthony (4)	Madison Square Garden; 19,812	15–22
38	January 14	@ Charlotte	L 98–108	Carmelo Anthony (20)	Kenyon Martin & Carmelo Anthony (6)	Beno Udrih (5)	Time Warner Cable Arena; 15,156	15–23
39	January 16	@ Indiana	L 89–117	Carmelo Anthony (28)	Tyson Chandler (9)	Raymond Felton (5)	Bankers Life Fieldhouse; 18,165	15–24
40	January 17	L.A. Clippers	L 95–109	Carmelo Anthony (26)	Carmelo Anthony (20)	Raymond Felton (9)	Madison Square Garden; 19,812	15–25
41	January 20	Brooklyn	L 80–103	Carmelo Anthony (26)	Carmelo Anthony (12)	Raymond Felton (6)	Madison Square Garden; 19,812	15–26
42	January 22	Philadelphia	L 106–110	Carmelo Anthony (28)	Tyson Chandler (14)	Felton, Anthony (7)	Madison Square Garden; 19,812	15–27
43	January 24	Charlotte	W 125–96	Carmelo Anthony (62)	Carmelo Anthony (13)	Raymond Felton (5)	Madison Square Garden; 19,812	16–27
44	January 26	L.A. Lakers	W 110–103	Carmelo Anthony (35)	Tyson Chandler (14)	Carmelo Anthony & Raymond Felton (5)	Madison Square Garden; 19,812	17–27
45	January 28	Boston	W 114–88	Carmelo Anthony (24)	Tyson Chandler (13)	Raymond Felton (8)	Madison Square Garden; 19,812	18–27
46	January 30	Cleveland	W 117–86	Carmelo Anthony & Tim Hardaway Jr (29)	Tyson Chandler (8)	Raymond Felton (8)	Madison Square Garden; 19,812	19–27

February : 2–11 (home: 1–5; road: 1–6)

Game	Date	Team	Score	High points	High rebounds	High assists	Location Attendance	Record
47	February 1	Miami	L 91–106	Carmelo Anthony (26)	Tyson Chandler (11)	Raymond Felton & Carmelo Anthony (4)	Madison Square Garden; 19,812	19–28
48	February 3	@ Milwaukee	L 98–101	Carmelo Anthony (36)	Tyson Chandler (11)	Raymond Felton (7)	BMO Harris Bradley Center; 11,147	19–29
49	February 5	Portland	L 90–94	Carmelo Anthony (26)	Tyson Chandler (9)	Pablo Prigioni (7)	Madison Square Garden; 19,812	19–30
50	February 7	Denver	W 117–90	Carmelo Anthony (31)	Jeremy Tyler (11)	Raymond Felton (8)	Madison Square Garden; 19,812	20–30
51	February 9	@ Oklahoma City	L 100–112	Stoudemire & Felton (16)	Anthony, Chandler & Felton (7)	Raymond Felton (7)	Chesapeake Energy Arena; 18,203	20–31
52	February 12	Sacramento	L 101–106 (OT)	Carmelo Anthony (36)	Anthony & Chandler (11)	Raymond Felton (12)	Madison Square Garden; 19,812	20–32
All-Star Break
53	February 18	@ Memphis	L 93–98	Tim Hardaway Jr (23)	Carmelo Anthony (11)	Pablo Prigioni (10)	FedExForum; 17,317	20–33
54	February 19	@ New Orleans	W 98–91	Carmelo Anthony (42)	Tyson Chandler (11)	Raymond Felton (8)	Smoothie King Center; 16,495	21–33
55	February 21	@ Orlando	L 121–129 (2OT)	Carmelo Anthony (44)	Anthony & Chandler (11)	Raymond Felton (8)	Amway Center; 16,498	21–34
56	February 22	@ Atlanta	L 98–107	Carmelo Anthony (35)	Tyson Chandler (23)	Raymond Felton (10)	Philips Arena; 19,045	21–35
57	February 24	Dallas	L 108–110	Carmelo Anthony (44)	Tyson Chandler (12)	Felton & Smith (7)	Madison Square Garden; 19,812	21–36
58	February 27	@ Miami	L 82–108	Carmelo Anthony (29)	Tyson Chandler (16)	Felton & Smith (5)	American Airlines Arena; 19,634	21–37
59	February 28	Golden State	L 103–126	Carmelo Anthony (23)	Carmelo Anthony (16)	Felton & Chandler (3)	Madison Square Garden; 19,812	21–38

March : 11–5 (home: 4–1; road: 7–4)

Game	Date	Team	Score	High points	High rebounds	High assists	Location Attendance	Record
60	March 2	@ Chicago	L 90–109	Carmelo Anthony (21)	Tyson Chandler (22)	Raymond Felton (4)	United Center; 21,739	21–39
61	March 3	@ Detroit	L 85–96	Carmelo Anthony (28)	Tyson Chandler (18)	Raymond Felton (5)	Palace of Auburn Hills; 14,742	21–40
62	March 5	@ Minnesota	W 118–106	Carmelo Anthony (33)	Tyson Chandler (14)	Raymond Felton (8)	Target Center; 14,294	22–40
63	March 7	Utah	W 108–81	Carmelo Anthony (29)	Tyson Chandler (11)	Carmelo Anthony (8)	Madison Square Garden; 19,812	23–40
64	March 8	@ Cleveland	W 107–97	Carmelo Anthony (26)	Amar'e Stoudemire (12)	Raymond Felton (6)	Quicken Loans Arena; 20,562	24–40
65	March 10	Philadelphia	W 123–110	Tim Hardaway Jr. (28)	Carmelo Anthony (9)	Anthony & Smith (5)	Madison Square Garden; 19,812	25–40
66	March 12	@ Boston	W 116–92	Carmelo Anthony (34)	Cole Aldrich (10)	four players (4)	TD Garden; 18,624	26–40
67	March 15	Milwaukee	W 115–94	Carmelo Anthony (23)	J.R. Smith (8)	J.R. Smith (4)	Madison Square Garden; 19,812	27–40
68	March 19	Indiana	W 92–86	Carmelo Anthony (34)	Tyson Chandler (14)	Raymond Felton (6)	Madison Square Garden; 19,812	28–40
69	March 21	@ Philadelphia	W 93–92	Amar'e Stoudemire (22)	Stoudemire & Chandler (10)	Pablo Prigioni (9)	Wells Fargo Center; 12,745	29–40
70	March 23	Cleveland	L 100–106	Carmelo Anthony (32)	Carmelo Anthony (8)	Raymond Felton (8)	Madison Square Garden; 19,812	29–41
71	March 25	@ L.A. Lakers	L 96–127	Carmelo Anthony (29)	Carmelo Anthony (9)	Raymond Felton (6)	Staples Center; 18,997	29–42
72	March 26	@ Sacramento	W 107–99	Carmelo Anthony (36)	Tyson Chandler (8)	Raymond Felton (10)	Sleep Train Arena; 15,594	30–42
73	March 28	@ Phoenix	L 88–112	Carmelo Anthony (21)	Anthony & Chandler (7)	Raymond Felton (4)	US Airways Center; 17,106	30–43
74	March 30	@ Golden State	W 89–84	J.R. Smith (21)	Amar'e Stoudemire (13)	Raymond Felton (4)	Oracle Arena; 19,596	31–43
75	March 31	@ Utah	W 92–83	Carmelo Anthony (34)	Tyson Chandler (9)	Raymond Felton (6)	EnergySolutions Arena; 18,653	32–43

April : 5–2 (home: 3–1; road: 2–1)

Game	Date	Team	Score	High points	High rebounds	High assists	Location Attendance	Record
76	April 2	Brooklyn	W 110–81	J.R. Smith (24)	Carmelo Anthony (10)	J.R. Smith (6)	Madison Square Garden; 19,812	33–43
77	April 4	Washington	L 89–90	J.R. Smith (32)	Anthony & Chandler (8)	Prigioni & Felton (7)	Madison Square Garden; 19,812	33–44
78	April 6	@ Miami	L 91–102	J.R. Smith (32)	Tyson Chandler (11)	Carmelo Anthony (6)	American Airlines Arena; 19,647	33–45
79	April 11	@ Toronto	W 108–100	Carmelo Anthony (30)	Amar'e Stoudemire (11)	Pablo Prigioni (5)	Air Canada Centre; 19,800	34–45
80	April 13	Chicago	W 100–89	Tim Hardaway Jr. (20)	Tyson Chandler (12)	Raymond Felton (7)	Madison Square Garden; 19,812	35–45
81	April 15	@ Brooklyn	W 109–98	Tim Hardaway Jr. (16)	Cole Aldrich (13)	Toure Murry (5)	Barclays Center; 17,732	36–45
82	April 16	Toronto	W 95–92	J.R. Smith (30)	Cole Aldrich (16)	Pablo Prigioni (3)	Madison Square Garden; 19,812	37–45

2013–14 season schedule

== Player statistics ==
Legend
GP	Games played	GS	Games started	MPG	Minutes per game
FG%	Field-goal percentage	3P%	3-point field-goal percentage	FT%	Free-throw percentage
RPG	Rebounds per game	APG	Assists per game	SPG	Steals per game
BPG	Blocks per game	PPG	Points per game

Player	GP	GS	MPG	FG%	3P%	FT%	RPG	APG	SPG	BPG	PPG
Cole Aldrich	46	2	7.2	.541		.867	2.8	.3	.2	.7	2.0
Carmelo Anthony	77	77	38.7	.452	.402	.848	8.1	3.1	1.2	.7	27.4
Andrea Bargnani	42	39	29.9	.442	.278	.824	5.3	1.1	.3	1.2	13.3
Shannon Brown	19	0	7.8	.421		.667	.8	.2	.6	.0	2.1
Tyson Chandler	55	55	30.2	.593	.000	.632	9.6	1.1	.7	1.1	8.7
Earl Clark	9	0	7.8	.333	.167	.800	1.8	.2	.1	.7	2.6
Raymond Felton	65	65	31.0	.395	.318	.721	3.0	5.6	1.2	.4	9.7
Tim Hardaway	81	1	23.1	.428	.363	.828	1.5	.8	.5	.1	10.2
Kenyon Martin	32	15	19.8	.512	.000	.579	4.2	1.6	.8	.8	4.3
Toure' Murry	51	0	7.3	.434	.417	.590	.9	1.0	.4	.0	2.7
Pablo Prigioni	66	27	19.4	.461	.464	.917	2.0	3.5	1.0	.0	3.8
Iman Shumpert	74	58	26.5	.378	.333	.746	4.2	1.7	1.2	.2	6.7
Chris Smith	2	0	1.0				.0	.0	.0	.0	.0
J. R. Smith	74	37	32.7	.415	.394	.652	4.0	3.0	.9	.3	14.5
Amar'e Stoudemire	65	21	22.6	.557		.739	4.9	.5	.4	.6	11.9
Jeremy Tyler	41	0	9.7	.517		.542	2.7	.2	.1	.5	3.6
Beno Udrih	31	12	19.0	.425	.425	.833	1.8	3.5	.7	.1	5.6
Metta World Peace	29	1	13.4	.397	.315	.625	2.0	.6	.8	.3	4.8

== Awards ==
- Tim Hardaway Jr. was named to the NBA All-Rookie First Team at the end of the regular season.
- Carmelo Anthony was named Eastern Conference Player of the Week twice. First, for games played from January 6 through January 12, and then for games played from March 3 through March 9. He also led the league in minutes played per game during the regular season.

=== All-Star ===
- Carmelo Anthony participated as a starter for the Eastern Conference team in the 2014 NBA All-Star Game. It was the seventh All-Star selection of his career.

== Transactions ==
=== Overview ===
Players Added

Via draft

- Tim Hardaway Jr.

Via trade

- Andrea Bargnani

Via free agency

- Cole Aldrich
- Shannon Brown ^{[a]}
- Earl Clark ^{[b]}
- Ike Diogu ^{[c]}
- Chris Douglas-Roberts ^{[c]}
- C. J. Leslie ^{[c]}
- Kenyon Martin
- Toure' Murry
- Lamar Odom
- Pablo Prigioni (Re-signed)
- Chris Smith ^{[c]}
- J. R. Smith (Re-signed)
- Jeremy Tyler ^{[c]}
- Metta World Peace ^{[c]}
- Beno Udrih ^{[c]}
Players Lost

Via trade

- Marcus Camby
- Steve Novak
- Quentin Richardson

- ^{a} Signed for the rest of the season after two 10-day contracts.
- ^{b} Was not re-signed after the second 10-day contract expired.
- ^{c} Waived later in the season.

=== Trades ===
July 10, 2013	To New York Knicks Andrea Bargnani	To Toronto Raptors Marcus Camby; Steve Novak; Quentin Richardson; First round pick for the 2016 NBA Draft; Second round picks for the 2014 and 2017 NBA Drafts

== See also ==
- 2013–14 NBA season
