= Tim Hardaway Jr. =

American basketball player (born 1992)

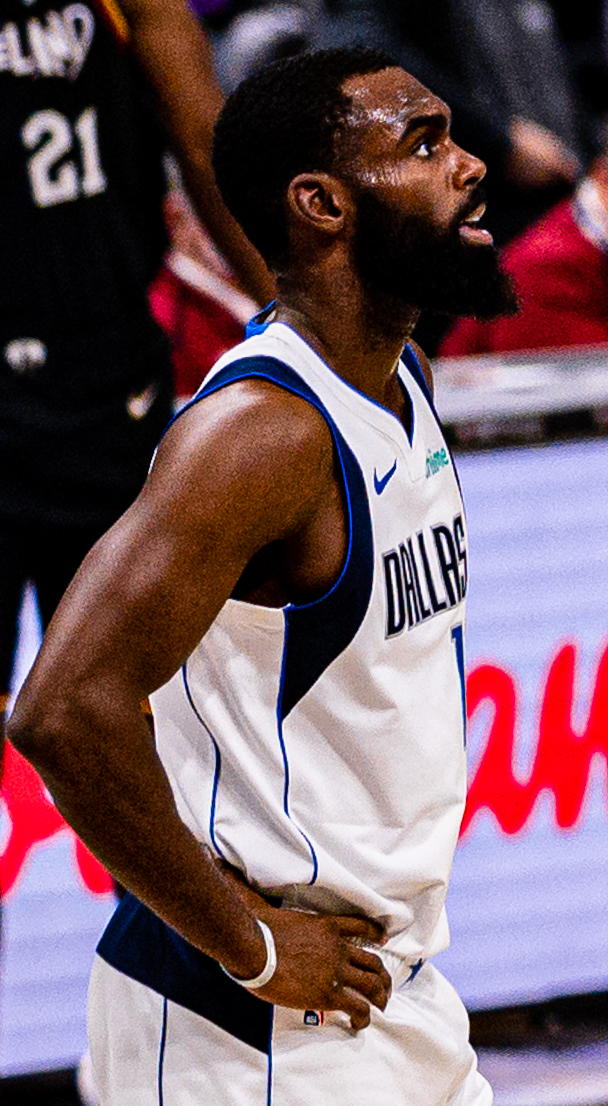
- Hardaway with the Dallas Mavericks in 2021

No. 10 – Miami Heat
- Position: Shooting guard
- League: NBA

Personal information
- Born: March 16, 1992 (age 34) Alameda, California, U.S.
- Listed height: 6 ft 5 in (1.96 m)
- Listed weight: 205 lb (93 kg)

Career information
- High school: Miami Palmetto (Pinecrest, Florida)
- College: Michigan (2010–2013)
- NBA draft: 2013: 1st round, 24th overall pick
- Drafted by: New York Knicks
- Playing career: 2013–present

Career history
- 2013–2015: New York Knicks
- 2015–2017: Atlanta Hawks
- 2015: →Canton Charge
- 2015–2016: →Austin Spurs
- 2017–2019: New York Knicks
- 2019–2024: Dallas Mavericks
- 2024–2025: Detroit Pistons
- 2025–2026: Denver Nuggets
- 2026–present: Miami Heat

Career highlights
- NBA All-Rookie First Team (2014); First-team All-Big Ten (2013); Third-team All-Big Ten (2012); Big Ten All-Freshman Team (2011)
- Stats at NBA.com
- Stats at Basketball Reference

Timothy Duane Hardaway Jr. (born March 16, 1992) is an American professional basketball player for the Miami Heat of the National Basketball Association (NBA). He played college basketball for the Michigan Wolverines and declared for the NBA draft after his junior season for the national runner-up 2012–13 team. Hardaway was selected as the 24th overall pick in the 2013 NBA draft by the New York Knicks. He has had two stints with the Knicks and has also played for the Atlanta Hawks, Dallas Mavericks, Detroit Pistons, and Denver Nuggets. He is the son of Hall of Famer Tim Hardaway. He holds several Mavericks three-point shooting records as well as the Pistons’ single-playoff game three-point shots made record. Hardaway was the 2025–26 NBA season leader in low turnover percentage, and is the NBA all-time career leader in that statistic.

As a freshman during the 2010–11 NCAA Division I men's basketball season, he earned four Big Ten Conference Freshman of the Week awards, including three in the final four weeks during which he averaged over 20 points a game to help the 2010–11 team to climb up to fourth in the 2010–11 Big Ten Conference men's basketball season standings. He was an honorable mention All-Big Ten selection and a unanimous Big Ten All-Freshman team selection following the season. He established the Michigan freshman record for single-season three-point shots made. He was a 2011 Collegeinsider.com Freshmen All-America selection and participated as a member of Team USA in the 2011 FIBA Under-19 World Championship. As a sophomore for the 2011–12 team, he earned the 2011–12 All-Big Ten 3rd team recognition. He earned 2012–13 All-Big Ten (1st team: coaches and 2nd team: media) recognition.

== Early life ==
Hardaway is the son of Yolanda and former NBA All-Star Tim Hardaway. He was born in Alameda, California, while his father was a member of the Golden State Warriors.

== High school career ==
Hardaway graduated from Miami Palmetto High School in the Pinecrest neighborhood of Miami-Dade County, Florida. As a freshman, he played high school football for a year before focusing on basketball. As he focused on basketball, he had a tumultuous relationship with his father, who acted like a second coach. His first college recruitment contact was by University of Michigan, communicating by mail during his second year. During his junior year, Michigan head coach John Beilein invited him on an unofficial visit to watch Michigan play No. 4 Duke on December 6 to see unranked Michigan pull an upset. The 81–73 victory was an important win for the program. Following his junior season, Hardaway began training with Ed Downs, with whom he would work every summer until he became an NBA draftee. In the summer before his senior season, he attended Beilein's Elite Camp in Ann Arbor, Michigan, receiving an offer that he accepted. At the time, Hardaway was unranked in the Rivals.com Top-150 and his only other offers were from Minnesota and Kansas State. He was a first team All-City selection in 2009 and 2010 after being a third team selection in 2008. During his 2009–10 senior season, he averaged 31.7 points, 7.3 rebounds and 4.0 assists. In the Florida state championships against Pine Crest School, he posted 42 points against Brandon Knight who had 36. ESPN rated him as the 93rd-best player and 28th-best shooting guard in the class of 2010. Scout.com rated him as the 36th-best shooting guard in his class. He was not top-ranked by Rivals.com. Hardaway has played summer Amateur Athletic Union (AAU) basketball for both the South Florida Heat and Chicago's Mac Irvin Fire, where he teamed with 7-foot (2.13 m) Meyers Leonard and McDonald's All-American Jereme Richmond.

College recruiting
Name	Hometown	School	Height	Weight	Commit date
Tim Hardaway Jr. SG	Miami, FL	Palmetto, (FL)	6 ft 3.5 in (1.92 m)	175 lb (79 kg)	Jun 29, 2009
Tim Hardaway Jr. SG	Recruit ratings: Scout: Rivals: (93)				
Overall recruit ranking: Scout: 36 (SG) ESPN: 93, 28 (SG)
Note: In many cases, Scout, Rivals, 247Sports, On3, and ESPN may conflict in their listings of height and weight.; In these cases, the average was taken. ESPN grades are on a 100-point scale.; Sources: "Michigan 2010 Basketball Commitments". Rivals.; "2010 Michigan Basketball Commits". Scout.; "ESPN". ESPN.; "Scout.com Team Recruiting Rankings". Scout.; "2010 Team Ranking". Rivals.

== College career ==
=== Freshman season (2010–2011) ===
Hardaway joined the team that had just lost Manny Harris who had declared for the 2010 NBA draft, and he began his season in the starting lineup for the 2010–11 Wolverines on November 13 against South Carolina Upstate. Although Hardaway led the team in scoring in his first career game and the season opener with 19 points, he was soon in a shooting slump that saw him shoot 4-for-30 on his field goals in late November games against Syracuse and UTEP. These games marked the beginning of a slump during which he went 13 consecutive games without achieving a 50% field goal accuracy and 19 games without exceeding that number.

Hardaway earned four Big Ten Freshman of the week awards. On December 27, the Big Ten Conference named Hardaway co-freshman of the week along with Jared Sullinger. On December 23, 2010, against Bryant University, the team tied its December 13, 2008, single-game school record of 16 three-point field goals made, and Hardaway was one of three Wolverines to make 4 three-point shots. It was Hardaway's first 20-point game. On February 14, Hardaway earned his second Big Ten Conference Freshman of the week recognition for his first career double-double on February 9 against Northwestern (17 points and a career-high 10 rebounds) and a career-high 26 points on February 12 against Indiana. The following week, Hardaway earned a third Big Ten Conference Freshman of the week award as he became the first Michigan freshman to score 30 points in a game in eight years. His thirty points came in a 75–72 February 19 overtime victory over Iowa. He had also scored 10 points and added 5 assists in a 54–52 loss to Illinois. On February 28, Hardaway earned his third consecutive and fourth overall Big Ten Conference Freshman of the week recognition. During the week, Hardaway extended his double-digit scoring streak to eleven by posting 22 points against Minnesota on February 26 after scoring 16 against No. 12 Wisconsin on February 23. For the week, he shot 9 for 15 on his three-point shots.

As a result of the three consecutive freshman of the week performances and a final week in which he scored 20 in the team's only game, he averaged 20.1 points during the final 7 games of the regular season while the team won six of its final eight, which enabled it to finish tied for fourth for the conference standings and earn the fourth seed in the 2011 Big Ten men's basketball tournament. He led the team in scoring during the 18-game conference schedule of the 2010–11 Big Ten Conference men's basketball season, edging out teammate Darius Morris by a 268–263 (14.9–14.6 points per game) margin. He also led the team in steals (1.17/game), free throw percentage (71.2%, min. 2.0 made/game), three-point shooting percentage (44.2%, min. 1.0 made/game), and three-point shots made per game (2.56) over the course of the conference schedule. Following the Big Ten Conference season, Hardaway was an honorable mention All-Big Ten selection by both the coaches and the media. Hardaway was also one of two unanimous All-Freshman team selections by the coaches. He was one of 21 players selected to the 2011 Collegeinsider.com Freshmen All-America selection.

In the semi-finals of the 2011 Big Ten tournament against Ohio State, he set the Michigan freshman single-season three-point shots made record of 74. For the season, Hardaway led the team in three-point shots made per game and free throw percentage (among qualifying players). He finished the season with 16 consecutive double digit scoring efforts.

Following the season he was invited to the June 17–24, 2011 17-man tryouts for the 12-man FIBA Under-19 World Championship team by USA Basketball. The twelve selected players competed as Team USA in the 2011 FIBA U19 World Championships in Latvia from June 30 to July 10, 2011. He was selected to the team.

=== Sophomore season (2011–2012) ===
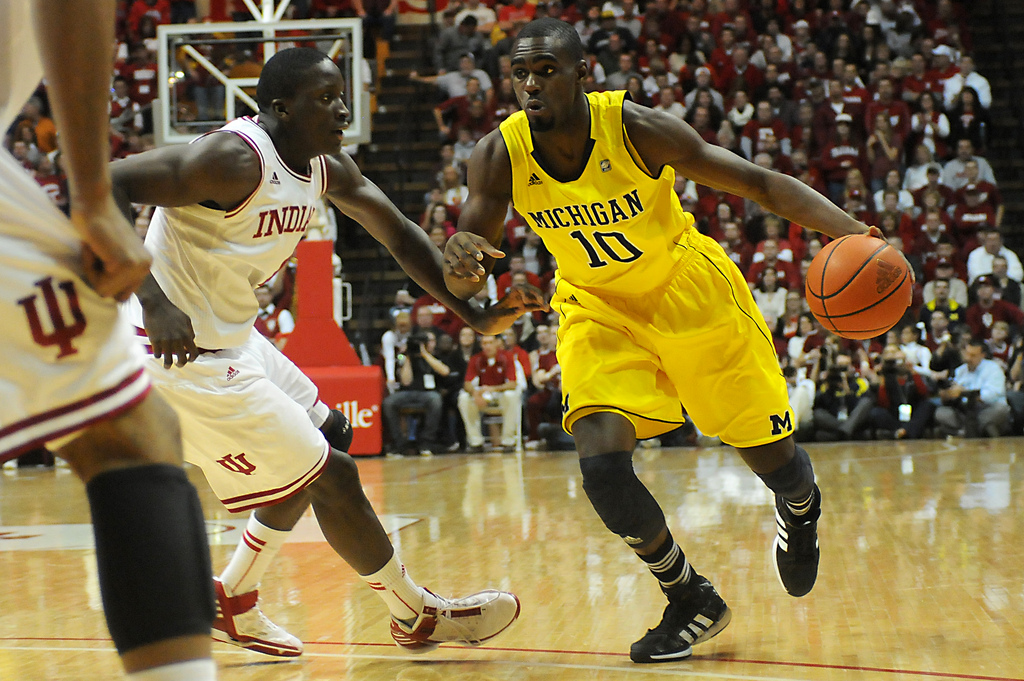
Hardaway (right) against Victor Oladipo in 2012

As a sophomore, he was a preseason top 50 watchlist selection for the John R. Wooden Award and the Naismith College Player of the Year. In the three-game November 21–23 2011 Maui Invitational Tournament, Hardaway scored 60 points against the No. 8 Memphis Tigers, No. 6 Duke Blue Devils, and 2011–12 Pac-12 season favorite UCLA Bruins, which helped the team finish in third place and earned him a place on the All-Tournament team. For his performance at the Maui Classic, he earned the Big Ten Player of the Week. In addition, he was named Big Ten Player of the Week by College Sports Madness. In the subsequent game, he picked up two fouls against Virginia in the first 5:33 and sat the final 14:27 of the first half. He finished the November 29 contest with just 5 points, snapping a 22-game double-digit scoring streak. On December 29, he opened the 2011–12 Big Ten Conference men's basketball season with 26 points against Penn State, despite making only 1 of 7 three-point shots. On January 8, 2012, he had his second career double-double with 17 points and 10 rebounds against 19th-ranked Wisconsin. By early February, he was in a deep shooting slump. He posted his second double-double of the season and third of his career on March 1 against Illinois with 25 points and a career-high 11 rebounds. As a sophomore, he earned the 2011–12 All-Big Ten 3rd team recognition by the coaches and media. The team earned a share of the 2011–12 Big Ten Conference regular season championship.

=== Junior season (2012–2013) ===
CBS Sports listed him as the 35th-best player in its preseason top 100. He was a preseason John R. Wooden Award top 50 selection. During the season, Trey Burke and Hardaway were constantly referred to as the best backcourt in college basketball. The praise came from a variety of leading media outlets such as FOX Sports, ESPN color commentator Dick Vitale, ESPN journalists such as Miles Simon, Bleacher Report columnist Zach Dirlam (who included backcourt depth provided by Nik Stauskas), as well as much local press.

Hardaway began the season with a double-double by scoring 25 points (including 5-for-5 three-point shooting) and adding 10 rebounds. His fourth career double-double earned him his second Big Ten Player of the Week award. Hardaway earned the NIT Season Tip-Off MVP with 39 points total in the November 21 semi-final and November 23 final against Pittsburgh and Kansas State, respectively. On December 20, he posted a career-high 7 assists against Eastern Michigan. Hardaway suffered an ankle injury that caused him to miss the December 29 game against Central Michigan and that broke his 81 consecutive games played streak that went back to the beginning of his Michigan career. In the subsequent game on January 3, he returned to the lineup for the 2012–13 Big Ten Conference men's basketball season-opener against Northwestern with 21 points and four assists in a 94–66 victory. Two games later on January 9, he tied a career high with 11 rebounds and added 15 points for his fifth career double-double. On January 17, Michigan defeated Minnesota (#9 AP/#12 Coaches) at Williams Arena, marking the first time Michigan defeated a top-10 team on the road since a December 6, 1996, victory by the 1996–97 team over Duke. Hardaway earned a second Big Ten Player of the Week Award following a 21-points performance on 7-for-8 shooting (4-for-5 three-point shot) with 5 rebounds, 3 assists, 3 steals and 2 blocks. On January 28, Michigan was ranked number one in the AP Poll with 51 of the 65 first-place votes. It marked the first time Michigan ranked atop the AP Poll since the 1992–93 Fab Five team did so on December 5, 1992. On February 5, Hardaway tallied a career-high 6 three-point shots, including three on consecutive possessions to give Michigan its first lead of the second half in an overtime victory against Ohio State.

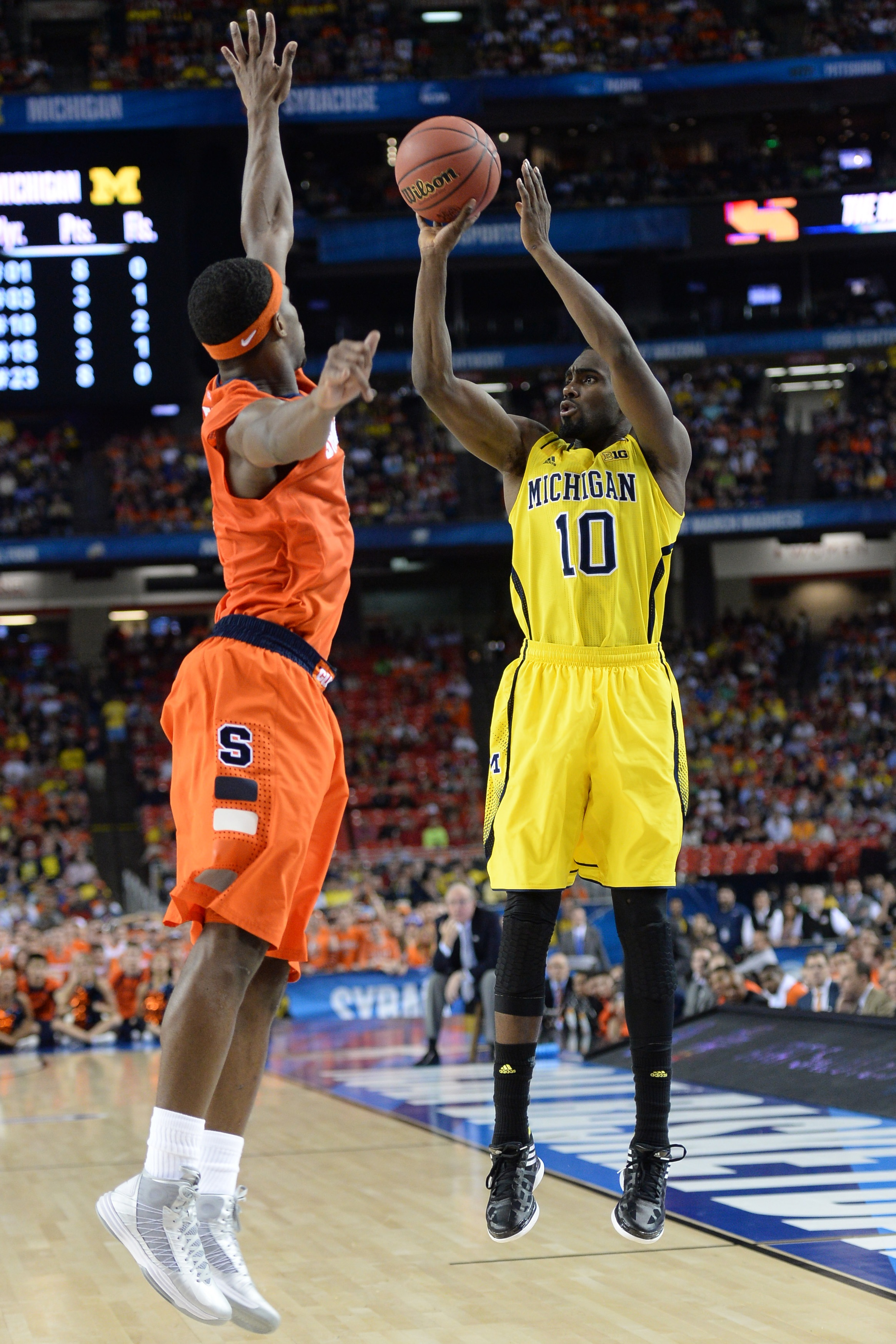
Hardaway against C. J. Fair in 2013

Prior to the 2013 NCAA Men's Division I Basketball Tournament, Jeff Goodman of CBSSports.com named Michigan with Hardaway first among tournament teams in terms of having the most future NBA talent on its roster (in the absence of Kentucky who was relegated to the 2013 National Invitation Tournament). As a number four seed, Michigan defeated its first NCAA tournament opponent, South Dakota State, 71–56. Hardaway established a new NCAA tournament career-high with 21 points. The 27th victory of the season gave the team its most wins in 20 years and matched head coach John Beilein's career high. In the regional finals on March 31 against Florida, freshman Nik Stauskas made all 6 of his three-point shot attempts, pushing his single-season total to 79 and surpassing Hardaway's single-season freshman school record. Following the regional championship postgame prayer and with Mrs. Beilein's consent, Hardaway and Mitch McGary gave coach John Beilein a gatorade shower. In the April 6 national semi-final against Syracuse, Hardaway contributed a team-high 13 points, 6 rebounds and 5 assists. Two nights later, Michigan lost in the championship game to Louisville by an 82–76 margin as Hardaway contributed 12 points, 5 rebounds and 4 assists.

On April 17, Hardaway declared for the NBA draft. Hardaway signed with sports agent Mark Bartelstein, the father of a former Michigan teammate, who represents 37 NBA players. Hardaway was one of 60 players invited to the NBA Draft Combine.

==== Honors and awards ====
Following the 2012–13 Big Ten season he was a 1st team All-Big Ten selection by the coaches and a 2nd team selection by the media. On March 12, the U.S. Basketball Writers Association named Hardaway to its 2012–13 Men's All-District V (OH, IN, IL, MI, MN, WI) Team, based upon voting from its national membership. He was named to the National Association of Basketball Coaches Division I All‐District 7 first team on March 26, as selected and voted on by member coaches of the NABC, making him eligible for the State Farm Coaches’ Division I All-America team.

== Professional career ==
=== New York Knicks (2013–2015) ===
Hardaway was drafted 24th overall by the New York Knicks. Trey Burke and Hardaway became the first Michigan duo selected in the first round since Juwan Howard and Jalen Rose in the 1994 NBA draft. Hardaway joined his father (14th in 1989 NBA draft) as a first round selection.

On July 8, the Knicks announced that Hardaway signed a four-year, $6.1 million contract, clearing the way for him to play in the 2013 NBA Summer League. In the second game of the summer league, on July 14, he suffered a bruised wrist. Hardaway's Summer League season ended as a result of the mishap, although the injury only had a short-term impact.

Hardaway made his regular season debut in the 2013–14 Knicks season-opener on October 30, at home against Milwaukee, with 5 points on a 2–2 shooting night and 2 assists, during 15 minutes of playing time. In his second game, on October 31 against the Chicago Bulls, he played 27 minutes, totalling 10 points and 3 rebounds. After Smith returned to the lineup, Hardaway scored 11 points against the San Antonio Spurs on November 10 and 14 points against the Atlanta Hawks on November 13, for sequential career highs. He posted his first three-assist game on November 16 in another contest against the Hawks. On December 1 against the New Orleans Pelicans, Hardaway had a career-high 21 points. When Kenyon Martin sat out against the Boston Celtics on December 8, Hardaway earned his first NBA start. With Carmelo Anthony and Raymond Felton sitting out the Christmas Day game against the Oklahoma City Thunder, Hardaway matched his career high with 21 points. On January 29, he was named a Rising Stars Challenge participant as part of the 2014 NBA All-Star Game weekend. The following night Hardaway set a career high with a game-high (tied with Carmelo Anthony) 29 points against the Cleveland Cavaliers. Hardaway finished fifth in the NBA Rookie of the Year Award balloting. He was also a first-team NBA All-Rookie Team selection.

Hardaway committed to represent the Knicks in 2014 NBA Summer League. In five summer league games, he averaged 22.8 points per game, which was second in the league. He earned NBA All-Summer League second team recognition.

On January 24, 2015, Hardaway posted a season-high 25 points along with 6 rebounds and 5 assists against the Charlotte Hornets. After playing two minutes against the Phoenix Suns, Hardaway injured his wrist on March 15. He then missed the next 9 games before returning to the lineup on April 3 against the Washington Wizards. He again posted 25 points in the season finale on April 15 against Detroit.

=== Atlanta Hawks (2015–2017) ===
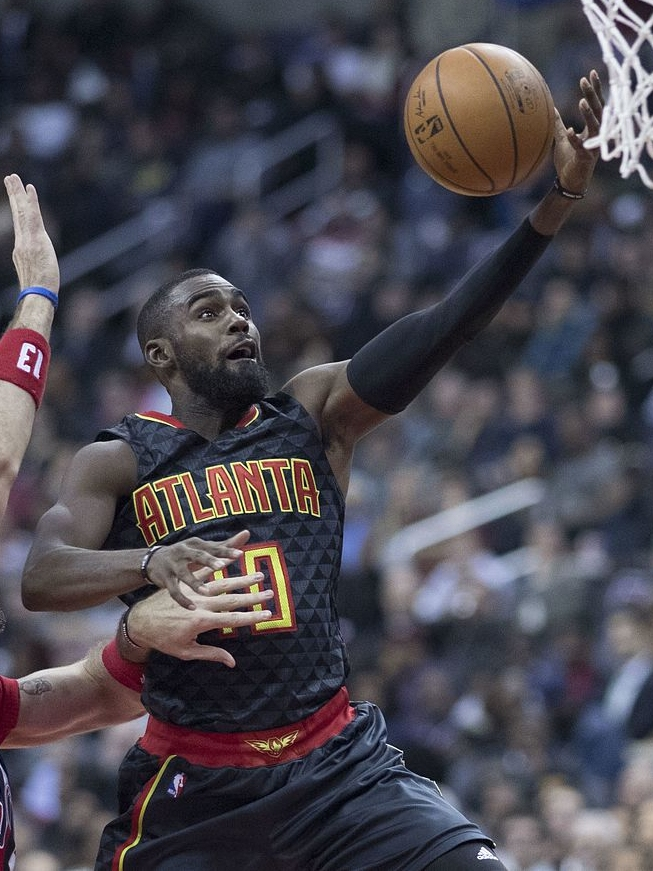
Hardaway with the Hawks in 2017

On June 25, 2015, Hardaway was traded to the Atlanta Hawks in exchange for the draft rights to Jerian Grant. According to Hardaway, Hawks head coach Mike Budenholzer told him that he would not play the first 25 games of the 2015-16 NBA season. However, Hardaway did debut with the Hawks on November 24 against the Boston Celtics in the team's 16th game.

On December 3, 2015, using the flexible assignment rule, the Hawks assigned Hardaway to the Canton Charge, the D-League affiliate of the Cleveland Cavaliers. He was recalled by the Hawks three days later. On December 28, again using the flexible assignment rule, he was assigned this time to the Austin Spurs, the affiliate of the San Antonio Spurs. On January 3, 2016, he was recalled by the Hawks. Two days later, he played in his first game for the Hawks since November 28, scoring three points in 12 minutes off the bench in a 107–101 loss to the New York Knicks.

Hardaway made his first start for Atlanta on March 17, 2016, against the Denver Nuggets. He posted a season-high 21 points, seven rebounds, four assists, a steal and no turnovers in a season-high 29 minutes, far surpassing his February 3 season best of 13 points against Philadelphia 76ers.

In the Hawks' season opener on October 27, 2016, Hardaway scored 21 points off the bench in a 114–99 win over the Washington Wizards. Twelve of his points came in the final quarter as the Hawks extended their one-point lead. On January 1, 2017, he matched his career high with 29 points, including a tying three-pointer with 3.3 seconds remaining in regulation, nine points in overtime and the go-ahead free throw with 10.8 seconds remaining in overtime, to help the Hawks defeat the San Antonio Spurs 114–112. On February 2, Hardaway contributed 23 of his career-high 33 points in the fourth quarter, as he helped his team rally from as many as 20 points down against the Houston Rockets to win the contest. On March 3, he made five of nine three-pointers and scored a career-high 36 points in a 135–130 loss to the Cleveland Cavaliers. Hardaway had a career-high 9 rebounds to go along with 21 points on April 9 against Cleveland as part of a week in which Hardaway averaged 22 points in a 3–0 week for the Hawks.

=== Return to New York (2017–2019) ===
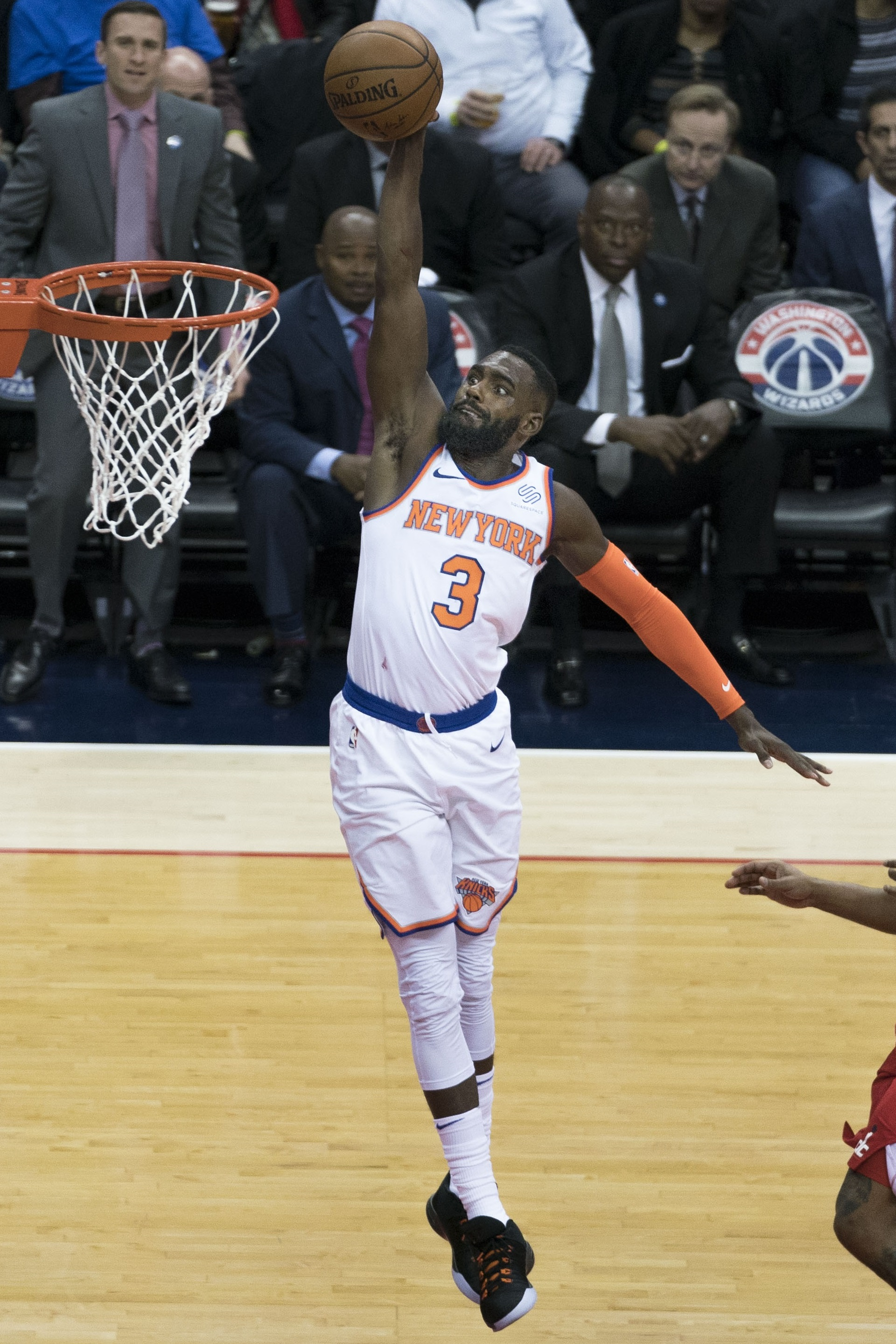
Hardaway with the Knicks in 2018

Following the 2016–17 season, the Hawks extended Hardaway a qualifying offer, making him a restricted free agent. On July 6, 2017, Hardaway received a four-year, $71 million offer sheet from the Knicks; Atlanta had 48 hours to match the offer or lose Hardaway. The contract of $16.50M, $17.32M, $18.15M and $18.97M contained a player option in year 4 and included a 15% bonus of outstanding years 1 through 3 salary in the event of a trade. The Hawks declined to match the offer, and Hardaway signed with the Knicks on July 8.

On November 8, with Kristaps Porziņģis sidelined, Hardaway posted his first NBA career double-double with a game-high 26 points and 11 rebounds against the Orlando Magic. On November 22, Hardaway scored a then-career-high 38 points in a 108–100 victory over the Toronto Raptors. On December 5, he was ruled out for at least two weeks with a stress injury to his left leg. On January 12, he returned for the Knicks after missing 20 games. He scored 16 points in 25 minutes off the bench in a 118–108 loss to the Minnesota Timberwolves. On March 23, he scored a career-high 39 points in a 108–104 loss to the Timberwolves.

In the Knicks' season opener on October 17, 2018, Hardaway scored 31 points in a 126–107 win over the Atlanta Hawks. The Knicks had a franchise-record, 49-point second quarter behind Hardaway's 16-point quarter. On October 29, he scored 25 points and tied a career high with eight assists in a 115–96 win over the Brooklyn Nets. On October 31, he scored 37 points, including career highs of 7 three-point field goals and 10 field goals, in a 107–101 loss to the Indiana Pacers.

=== Dallas Mavericks (2019–2024) ===
On January 31, 2019, Hardaway was traded, along with Trey Burke, Courtney Lee and Kristaps Porziņģis, to the Dallas Mavericks in exchange for DeAndre Jordan, Wesley Matthews, Dennis Smith Jr. and two future first-round draft picks. After averaging 15.5 points in 19 games for the Mavericks, he was sidelined for the final 11 games with a lower leg stress fracture that required surgery.

On November 20, 2019, Hardaway was inserted into the starting lineup for the first time that season, scoring 20 points in a 142–94 win against the Golden State Warriors. On December 8, 2019, he made a career-high 9 three-pointers in a 110–106 loss to the Sacramento Kings. Hardaway finished the regular season with a career-high 204 three-pointers made, 7th most in the NBA.

On November 19, 2020, after the conclusion of the 2019–20 season, Hardaway exercised his contractual option to remain with the Mavericks. After the 2020–21 NBA season, Hardaway finished 5th in voting for the NBA Sixth Man of the Year Award, one spot behind teammate Jalen Brunson. On April 30, 2021, (with Luka Dončić and Dorian Finney-Smith sidelined), Hardaway posted his career-high 42 points against the Detroit Pistons. On May 4, 2021, against the Miami Heat Hardaway went 10–18 for three-point shots. This tied two records. He tied George McCloud (December 16, 1995) and Wesley Matthews (December 6, 2015) for the Dallas Maverick single-game three-point shots made franchise record. He tied Duncan Robinson (December 10, 2019), Paul George (February 1, 2019) and J.R. Smith (April 6, 2014) for the FTX Arena (the arena where his father's jersey hangs as a retired number) NBA record for three-point shots made (10). With his 207 three-point shots made, he became not only the first Dallas Maverick with back-to-back 200-plus three-point-shot seasons, but the first with multiple 200-plus three-point-shots seasons.

Hardaway re-signed with the Mavericks on a 4-year, $75 million contract on August 9, 2021. On February 1, 2022, he underwent left foot surgery for his fifth metatarsal bone and was ruled out indefinitely. According to the Elias Sports Bureau, Hardaway and Dončić became the first pair of teammates in league history to each hit four-plus three-point shots in the same streak of five games from November 29 to December 6, 2022. During the streak, Hardaway Jr. shot 54.5% (30–55) on his threes, while the Mavericks went 4–1, and he became the 10th NBA player (2nd Maverick, McCloud 6 games, Feb 25 – March 5, 1996) to post five-plus three-point shots in at least five consecutive games. With his 212 threes made in 2022–23 marked his third season with over 200 three-point shots. He remains the only Maverick with multiple 200-plus three-point-shot seasons.

On December 18, 2023, Hardaway made two three point shots to pass his father for 44th place on the all-time list. Hardaway reached the 2024 NBA Finals where the Mavericks lost to the Boston Celtics in five games. In game 4 of the series Hardaway established a Mavericks franchise record for most 3-point shots made in an NBA Finals game with 5. All of his shots were in the fourth quarter, tying him with Ray Allen and Kenny Smith in second place behind Steph Curry for most in a single quarter in NBA finals history.

=== Detroit Pistons (2024–2025) ===
On July 6, 2024, Hardaway was traded alongside three future second-round picks to the Detroit Pistons in exchange for Quentin Grimes. On December 16, after Miami went on a 26–2 run to take an 8 point lead in overtime, Hardaway made consecutive three-point shots on three consecutive possessions in less than a minute span to put Detroit ahead and help lead them to a victory. In a 2025 NBA playoffs opening round game 3 118–116 loss to New York, Hardaway set a career playoff best with 7 three-point shots made, including his first 6 three point attempts and a 5–5 first half three point performance in what was the Piston's first home playoff game in 6 years. The effort tied Chauncey Billups' 2003 performance for most single-playoff game three point shots made in franchise history. Hardaway attempted a three point shot just before the final buzzer of game 4. He missed the shot resulting in a one-point loss and a 3–1 series lead for New York. Physical contact during the attempt from Josh Hart was ruled to be a legal defensive play in the moment. However, in a postgame review crew chief David Guthrie determined that a three-shot shooting foul should have been called.

=== Denver Nuggets (2025–2026) ===
On July 10, 2025, Hardaway signed a one-year, minimum salary contract with the Denver Nuggets. During the 2025–26 Denver Nuggets season, Hardaway surpassed the former team record of 216 single-season three point shots set by Michael Porter Jr. two seasons earlier, but Jamal Murray made even more three-point shots that season for the Nuggets so Hardaway did not set the team record. Hardaway made more three point shots than any other NBA reserve during the season. After finishing second in the league three previous times, Hardaway led the NBA in turnover percentage for the season. Hardaway is the all-time NBA career leader in turnover percentage. Hardaway Jr. also finished third in the voting for the NBA Sixth Man of the Year Award, behind Keldon Johnson and Jaime Jaquez Jr..

=== Miami Heat (2026–present) ===
On July 6, 2026, Hardaway signed a one-year, $6.5 million contract with the Miami Heat. Hardaway was coming off of a season during which he set career-highs in made three-point shots (224) and three point percentage (40.7%) and a stretch where he only missed 10 games over the previous 3 regular seasons. Initially, his father stated he would not allow his son to wear his retired former number at Miami. Social media and podcast backlash became heated and he reversed course. Hardaway Jr. was the first Miami Heat player to be issued the number 10 since the retirement of his father’s jersey with the team in 2009. When Hardaway Sr. played for the Heat, head coach Pat Riley often tasked Erik Spoelstra with entertaining Hardaway Jr. with basketball drills. At the time of the Hardaway, Jr. signing, Spoelstra was head coach and Riley was Team President.

== National team career ==
Hardaway represented Team USA at the 2011 FIBA Under-19 World Championship, including a team high 21-points in the 5th place game against the Hugh Greenwood-led Australia team. Hardaway credits U19 assistant coach Tom Thibodeau with improving his defensive skills. On July 18, 2014, Hardaway was named to practice with the USA Basketball National Select Team from July 28 to 31.

== Career statistics ==
Legend
GP	Games played	GS	Games started	MPG	Minutes per game
FG%	Field goal percentage	3P%	3-point field goal percentage	FT%	Free throw percentage
RPG	Rebounds per game	APG	Assists per game	SPG	Steals per game
BPG	Blocks per game	PPG	Points per game	**Bold**	Career high

=== NBA ===
==== Regular season ====
Year	Team	GP	GS	MPG	FG%	3P%	FT%	RPG	APG	SPG	BPG	PPG
2013–14	New York	**81**	1	23.2	.428	.363	.828	1.5	.8	.5	.1	10.2
2014–15	New York	70	30	24.0	.389	.342	.801	2.2	1.8	.3	**.2**	11.5
2015–16	Atlanta	51	1	16.9	.430	.338	**.893**	1.7	1.0	.4	.1	6.4
2016–17	Atlanta	79	30	27.3	**.455**	.357	.766	2.8	2.3	.7	**.2**	14.5
2017–18	New York	57	54	**33.1**	.421	.317	.816	**3.9**	**2.7**	**1.1**	**.2**	17.5
2018–19	New York	46	46	32.6	.388	.347	.854	3.5	**2.7**	.9	.1	**19.1**
2018–19	Dallas	19	17	29.3	.404	.321	.767	3.2	1.9	.6	.1	15.5
2019–20	Dallas	71	58	29.5	.434	.398	.819	3.3	1.9	.6	.1	15.8
2020–21	Dallas	70	31	28.4	.447	.391	.816	3.3	1.8	.4	**.2**	16.6
2021–22	Dallas	42	20	29.6	.394	.336	.757	3.7	2.2	.9	.1	14.2
2022–23	Dallas	71	45	30.3	.401	.385	.770	3.5	1.8	.7	**.2**	14.4
2023–24	Dallas	79	12	26.8	.402	.353	.852	3.2	1.8	.5	.1	14.4
2024–25	Detroit	77	**77**	28.0	.406	.368	.855	2.4	1.6	.5	.1	11.0
2025–26	Denver	80	6	26.6	.447	**.407**	.811	2.6	1.4	.5	.1	13.5
Career		893	428	27.3	.419	.366	.815	2.8	1.8	.6	.1	13.7

==== Playoffs ====
Year	Team	GP	GS	MPG	FG%	3P%	FT%	RPG	APG	SPG	BPG	PPG
2016	Atlanta	9	0	9.7	.269	.143	.667	1.0	.8	.0	.1	2.2
2017	Atlanta	6	6	33.3	.329	.262	.632	2.7	1.2	.5	.0	12.8
2020	Dallas	6	6	34.0	.421	.352	.727	**3.5**	**1.8**	.3	.0	**17.8**
2021	Dallas	7	**7**	**37.4**	.416	**.404**	**.750**	3.3	1.4	.4	.0	17.0
2024	Dallas	**14**	0	12.7	.379	.351	.500	1.8	.4	.4	.1	4.4
2025	Detroit	6	6	31.3	.338	.308	.800	2.8	1.2	.3	.0	12.0
2026	Denver	6	0	23.3	**.422**	.348	.792	3.3	.8	**.7**	**.3**	10.8
Career		54	25	23.3	.379	.330	.713	2.4	1.0	.4	.1	9.6

=== College ===
Year	Team	GP	GS	MPG	FG%	3P%	FT%	RPG	APG	SPG	BPG	PPG
2010–11	Michigan	35	35	30.7	.420	.367	**.765**	3.8	1.7	**1.0**	.1	13.9
2011–12	Michigan	34	34	34.2	.418	.283	.715	3.8	2.1	.5	.3	**14.6**
2012–13	Michigan	**38**	**38**	**34.8**	**.437**	**.374**	.694	**4.7**	**2.4**	.7	**.4**	14.5
Career		107	107	33.3	.425	.343	.724	4.1	2.1	.7	.3	14.3

=== Records ===
- Most single-NBA game three-point shots in Kaseya Center, tied (10, May 4, 2021, tied Duncan Robinson, Paul George and J.R. Smith)
- Most single-game three-point shots for the Dallas Mavericks (10, May 4, 2021, tied Wesley Matthews, George McCloud)
- Most 200+ three-point shots seasons for the Dallas Mavericks (4)
- Most consecutive 200+ three-point seasons for the Dallas Mavericks (2)
- Most three-point shots made for the Dallas Mavericks in a finals game, half or quarter (5, June 14, 2024)
- Most three-point shots made for the Detroit Pistons in a playoff game (7, April 24, 2025, tied Chauncey Billups)

== Personal life ==
Hardaway is the son of Yolanda and former NBA All-Star Tim Hardaway. He was born in Alameda, California, while his father was a member of the Golden State Warriors.

He has a sister named Nia. During the 2012–13 season, Hardaway memorialized deceased friends on his left shoe and deceased family members on his right shoe.

== See also ==
- List of second-generation NBA players
- List of NBA career 3-point scoring leaders
- Michigan Wolverines men's basketball statistical leaders
