= Redefined: J. R. Smith =

- Genre: Sports documentary
- Directed by: Philip Knowlton
- Starring: J. R. Smith
- Composer: William Brown
- Country of origin: United States
- Original language: English
- No. of seasons: 1
- No. of episodes: 4

Production
- Executive producers: Philip Byron; Maverick Carter; Jamal Henderson; LeBron James
- Cinematography: Taresh Moore; Moji Wilson
- Running time: 28-31 minutes
- Production companies: Uninterrupted; Amazon Studios

Original release
- Network: Prime Video
- Release: April 4, 2023

Redefined: J. R. Smith is an American television documentary series about former professional basketball player J. R. Smith. It premiered on Prime Video on April 4, 2023.

== Summary ==
The docuseries follows two-time NBA champion J. R. Smith through his post-NBA career, as he pursues a college education at North Carolina A&T State University and joins the men's golf team at the school. The series focuses on his challenges on the golf course as well as his lifelong battle with dyslexia and ADHD. It includes interviews with Smith's parents, ESPN anchor Scott Van Pelt, Smith's former teammate Iman Shumpert, and other fellow athletes.

== Cast ==
- J. R. Smith
- Richard Watkins
- Diego Gonzalez
- Kim Burke
- Jelani Favors
- Dawn Forbes Murphy
- Xavier Williams
- Anthony Ford
- Iman Shumpert
- Scott Van Pelt
- Ida Smith
- Earl Smith, Jr.
- Maverick Carter

== Episodes ==
No.	Title	Directed by	Original release date
1	"Mulligan"	Philip Knowlton	4 April 2023
Smith reflects on his NBA career and arrives on campus at North Carolina A&T.
2	"Three the Hard Way"	Philip Knowlton	4 April 2023
Smith meets his new teammates and adjusts to online classes.
3	"Reading the Green"	Philip Knowlton	4 April 2023
Smith embraces his studies as he prepares for his collegiate golf debut.
4	"Swish"	Philip Knowlton	4 April 2023
Smith leads a closed-door meeting among his teammates.

== Production ==
On March 15, 2023, it was reported that J. R. Smith would be the subject of a new docuseries for Amazon, to be executive produced by LeBron James and Maverick Carter under their Uninterrupted banner, as well as Jamal Henderson and Philip Byron, with Philip Knowlton directing.

== Release ==
The four-part docuseries premiered on Prime Video on April 4, 2023.
