= 2014 NBA All-Star Game =

Exhibition basketball game

	1	2	3	4	Total
East	42	34	47	40	163
West	44	45	37	29	155
- Date: February 16, 2014
- Arena: Smoothie King Center
- City: New Orleans
- MVP: Kyrie Irving (East)
- National anthem: Gary Clark, Jr. (U.S.), Serena Ryder (Canadian)
- Halftime show: Trombone Shorty, Dr. John, Janelle Monáe, Earth, Wind, and Fire, Gary Clark, Jr.
- Attendance: 14,727
- Network: TNT (United States); TSN (Canada)
- Announcers: Marv Albert, Steve Kerr and Reggie Miller; Kevin Harlan, Reggie Miller, Chris Webber, Steve Kerr, Charles Barkley and Kenny Smith (All-Star Saturday Night); Matt Winer, Grant Hill and Chris Webber (Rising Stars Challenge)

NBA All-Star Game
< 2013	2015 >

The 2014 NBA All-Star Game was an exhibition basketball game that was played on February 16, 2014, during the National Basketball Association's (NBA) 2013–14 season. It was the 63rd edition of the NBA All-Star Game, and was played at Smoothie King Center in New Orleans, home of the New Orleans Pelicans. The Eastern Conference defeated the Western Conference, 163–155. Kyrie Irving was named the All-Star Game Most Valuable Player. The game was televised nationally on TNT in the United States, and TSN in Canada.

The Pelicans (the name was changed by new team owner Tom Benson for the 2013–14 season) were awarded the All-Star Game in an announcement by commissioner David Stern on April 16, 2012. It was the second time that New Orleans had hosted the All-Star game; the city had hosted the event in 2008, also at the Smoothie King Center (then known as New Orleans Arena).

Starters for the game were selected by the fans, who could select three frontcourt players and two guards for each conference. LeBron James was the leading vote-getter with 1,416,419 votes. Stephen Curry was also voted as a starter in first All-Star selection, after leading all Western Conference guards in the voting, while Kevin Love overtook Dwight Howard for the final frontcourt starting spot for the West.

== All-Star Game ==
=== Coaches ===
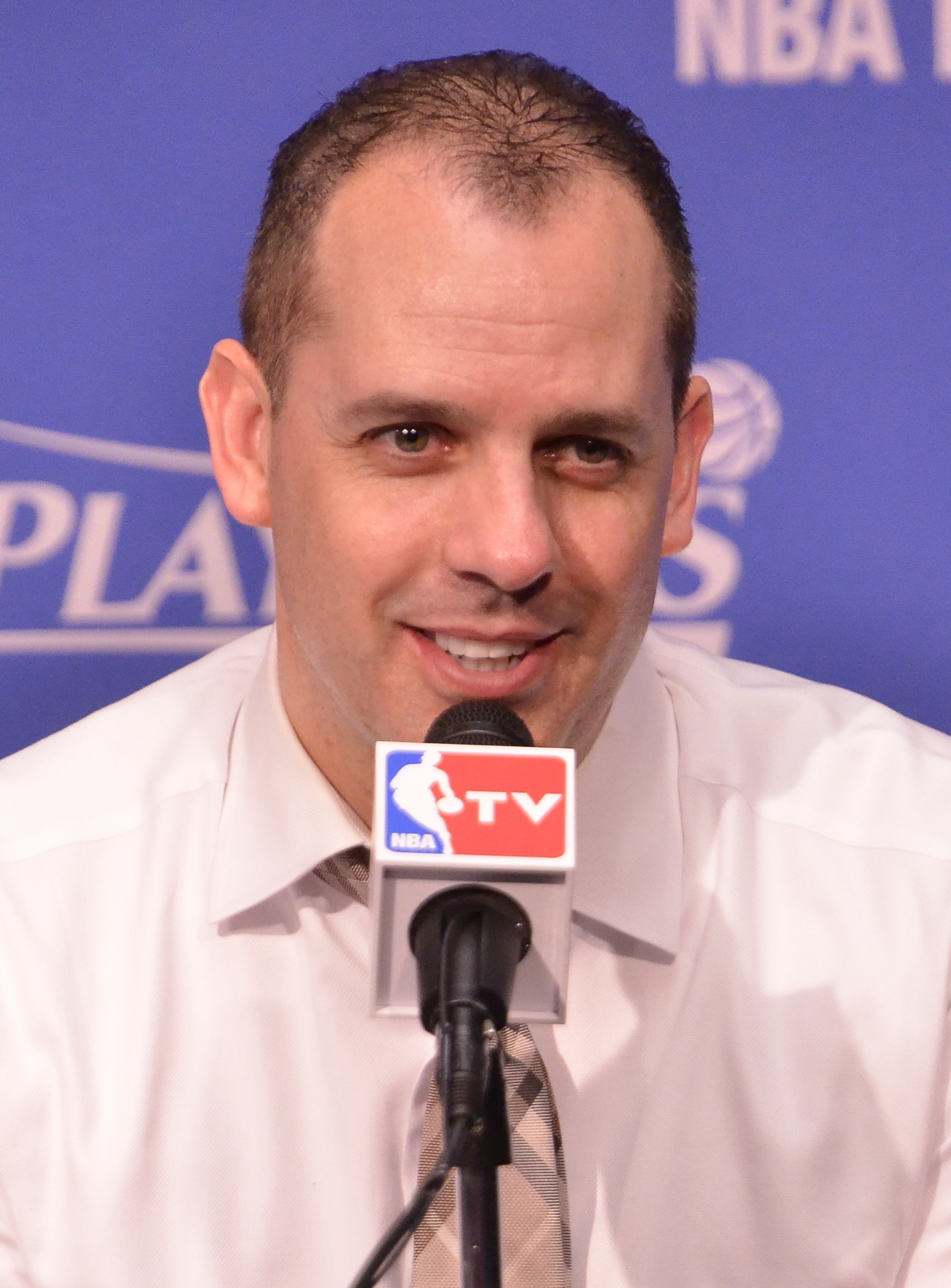
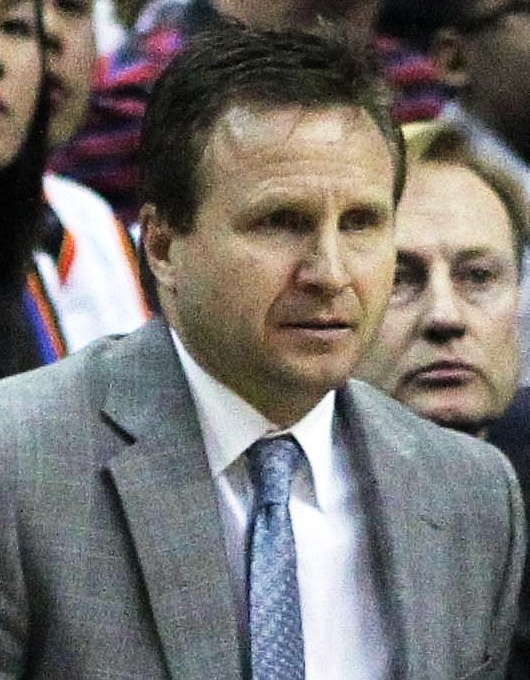
Frank Vogel (left) and Scott Brooks (right) were selected as the East and West head coach, respectively.

Frank Vogel, coach of the Indiana Pacers, and Scott Brooks, coach of the Oklahoma City Thunder, were selected as the East and West head coach, respectively. Both the Pacers and the Thunder led their respective conferences entering the game.

=== Roster ===
Eastern Conference All-Stars
Pos	Player	Team	No. of selections	Votes
Starters
G	Dwyane Wade	Miami Heat	10	929,542
G	Kyrie Irving	Cleveland Cavaliers	2	860,221
F	LeBron James	Miami Heat	10	1,416,419
F	Paul George	Indiana Pacers	2	1,211,318
F	Carmelo Anthony	New York Knicks	7	935,702
Reserves
C	Joakim Noah	Chicago Bulls	2	—
C	Roy Hibbert	Indiana Pacers	2	—
F/C	Chris Bosh	Miami Heat	9	—
F	Paul Millsap	Atlanta Hawks	1	—
G	John Wall	Washington Wizards	1	—
G	Joe Johnson	Brooklyn Nets	7	—
G	DeMar DeRozan	Toronto Raptors	1	—
Head coach: Frank Vogel (Indiana Pacers)

Western Conference All-Stars
Pos	Player	Team	No. of selections	Votes
Starters
G	Stephen Curry	Golden State Warriors	1	1,047,281
G	Kobe Bryant^{INJ} ^{1}	Los Angeles Lakers	16	988,864
F	Kevin Durant	Oklahoma City Thunder	5	1,396,294
F	Blake Griffin	Los Angeles Clippers	4	688,466
F/C	Kevin Love	Minnesota Timberwolves	3	661,246
Reserves
C	Dwight Howard	Houston Rockets	8	—
F	LaMarcus Aldridge	Portland Trail Blazers	3	—
F	Dirk Nowitzki	Dallas Mavericks	12	—
G	Chris Paul	Los Angeles Clippers	7	—
G	James Harden^{1}	Houston Rockets	2	—
G	Tony Parker	San Antonio Spurs	6	—
G	Damian Lillard	Portland Trail Blazers	1	—
F/C	Anthony Davis^{REP}	New Orleans Pelicans	1	—
Head coach: Scott Brooks (Oklahoma City Thunder)

^INJ Kobe Bryant was unable to participate due to injury.
^REP Anthony Davis was named as Kobe Bryant's replacement.
^{1} Scott Brooks chose James Harden to start in place of the injured Kobe Bryant.

=== Game ===
TNT

February 16, 2014
8:30 p.m. ET

Box score

Eastern Conference 163, Western Conference 155
Scoring by quarter: 42–44, 34–45, 47–37, 40–29
Pts: Irving 31; Rebs: James 7 Asts: Irving 14	Pts: Durant, Griffin 38 each Rebs: Howard 11; Asts: Paul 13

Smoothie King Center, New Orleans, Louisiana
Attendance: 14,727
Referees:
- #8 Marc Davis
- #12 Violet Palmer
- #23 Jason Phillips

Kyrie Irving scored 31 points and had 14 assists and was named the NBA All-Star Game Most Valuable Player (MVP) to help the East stop a three-game losing streak and win 163–155 in the second highest-scoring game in All-Star history. Carmelo Anthony added 30 points for the East and made a record eight three-pointers, one of 11 All-Star records that were broken in the game. The West was led by Kevin Durant and Blake Griffin, who both finished with 38 points, four short of Wilt Chamberlain's All-Star record in 1962.

== All-Star Weekend ==
=== BBVA Compass Rising Stars Challenge ===
Team Webber
Round	Pick	Pos.	Player	Team	R/S
1	1	F/C	Anthony Davis	New Orleans Pelicans	Sophomore
2	4	G	Michael Carter-Williams	Philadelphia 76ers	Rookie
3	6	G	Tim Hardaway Jr.	New York Knicks	Rookie
4	8	G	Trey Burke	Utah Jazz	Rookie
5	10	F	Jared Sullinger	Boston Celtics	Sophomore
6	12	F	Mason Plumlee	Brooklyn Nets	Rookie
7	14	G	Victor Oladipo	Orlando Magic	Rookie
Draw		C	Steven Adams	Oklahoma City Thunder	Rookie
Draw		F/C	Kelly Olynyk	Boston Celtics	Rookie
Head coach: Rex Kalamian (Oklahoma City Thunder)
General manager: Chris Webber

Team Hill
Round	Pick	Pos.	Player	Team	R/S
1	2	G	Damian Lillard	Portland Trail Blazers	Sophomore
2	3	G	Bradley Beal	Washington Wizards	Sophomore
3	5	C	Andre Drummond	Detroit Pistons	Sophomore
4	7	F	Harrison Barnes	Golden State Warriors	Sophomore
5	9	F	Terrence Jones	Houston Rockets	Sophomore
6	11	F/G	Giannis Antetokounmpo	Milwaukee Bucks	Rookie
7	13	C	Jonas Valančiūnas	Toronto Raptors	Sophomore
Draw		G	Dion Waiters	Cleveland Cavaliers	Sophomore
Draw		F/C	Pero Antić^{INJ}	Atlanta Hawks	Rookie
—		F/C	Miles Plumlee^{REP}	Phoenix Suns	Sophomore
Head coach: Nate McMillan (Indiana Pacers)
General manager: Grant Hill

^INJ Pero Antić was unable to participate due to injury.
^REP Miles Plumlee was named Pero Antić's replacement.

TNT

February 14
9:00 p.m. ET

Boxscore

Team Webber 136, Team Hill 142
Scoring by half: 66–67, 70–75
Pts: Tim Hardaway Jr. 36; Rebs: Anthony Davis 8 Asts: Michael Carter-Williams 9	Pts: Dion Waiters 31; Rebs: Andre Drummond 25; Asts: Dion Waiters 7

Smoothie King Center, New Orleans, Louisiana
Attendance: 14,727
Referees:
- #70 Brent Barnaky
- #54 Nick Buchert
- #34 Kevin Cutler

=== Sears Shooting Stars Competition ===
Western Contestants
Team Name	Members	Team	First round	Final round
Team Curry	Stephen Curry	Golden State Warriors	1:05	–
Team Curry	Becky Hammon	San Antonio Stars	1:05	–
Team Curry	Dell Curry	(retired)	1:05	–
Team Durant	Kevin Durant	Oklahoma City Thunder	1:00	43.6
Team Durant	Skylar Diggins	Tulsa Shock	1:00	43.6
Team Durant	Karl Malone	(retired)	1:00	43.6

Eastern Contestants
Team Name	Members	Team	First round	Final round
Team Hardaway	Tim Hardaway Jr.	New York Knicks	1:25	–
Team Hardaway	Elena Delle Donne	Chicago Sky	1:25	–
Team Hardaway	Tim Hardaway Sr.	(retired)	1:25	–
Team Bosh	Chris Bosh	Miami Heat	35.6	31.4
Team Bosh	Swin Cash	Chicago Sky	35.6	31.4
Team Bosh	Dominique Wilkins	(retired)	35.6	31.4

=== Taco Bell Skill Challenge ===
Eastern Contestants
Team	Pos.	Player	Team	Height	Weight	First round	Final round
Team 1	F/G	Giannis Antetokounmpo	Milwaukee Bucks	6–10	205	45.0	–
Team 1	G/F	DeMar DeRozan	Toronto Raptors	6–7	216	45.0	–
Team 2	G	Michael Carter-Williams	Philadelphia 76ers	6–6	185	43.3	45.3
Team 2	G	Victor Oladipo	Orlando Magic	6–4	215	43.3	45.3

Western Contestants
Team	Pos.	Player	Team	Height	Weight	First round	Final round
Team 1	G	Trey Burke	Utah Jazz	6–1	190	40.6	45.2
Team 1	G	Damian Lillard	Portland Trail Blazers	6–3	195	40.6	45.2
Team 2	G	Goran Dragić	Phoenix Suns	6–3	190	42.3	–
Team 2	G	Reggie Jackson	Oklahoma City Thunder	6–3	208	42.3	–

=== Foot Locker Three-Pointer Contest ===
Eastern Contestants
Pos.	Player	Team	Height	Weight	First round	Final round
G	Bradley Beal	Washington Wizards	6–5	207	21	19 (18)
G	Kyrie Irving	Cleveland Cavaliers	6–3	191	17	–
G/F	Joe Johnson	Brooklyn Nets	6–7	240	11	–
G	Arron Afflalo	Orlando Magic	6–5	215	15	–

Western Contestants
Pos.	Player	Team	Height	Weight	First round	Final round
G	Marco Belinelli	San Antonio Spurs	6–5	195	19	19 (24)
G	Damian Lillard	Portland Trail Blazers	6–3	195	18	–
F/C	Kevin Love	Minnesota Timberwolves	6–10	243	16	–
G	Stephen Curry	Golden State Warriors	6–3	185	16	–

=== Sprite Slam Dunk Contest ===
Freestyle Round
Division	Position	Member	Team	Height	Weight	Result
East	F/G	Paul George	Indiana Pacers	6–9	220	Won
East	G	Terrence Ross	Toronto Raptors	6–7	195	Won
East	G	John Wall	Washington Wizards	6–4	195	Won
West	F	Harrison Barnes	Golden State Warriors	6–8	210	Lost
West	G	Damian Lillard	Portland Trail Blazers	6–3	195	Lost
West	G	Ben McLemore	Sacramento Kings	6–5	195	Lost

Battle Round
Division	Player	Result	Note
East	Terrence Ross, Toronto Raptors	Won	–
West	Damian Lillard, Portland Trail Blazers	Lost	–
East	Paul George, Indiana Pacers	Won	–
West	Harrison Barnes, Golden State Warriors	Lost	–
East	John Wall, Washington Wizards	Won	Voted Dunker of the Night
West	Ben McLemore, Sacramento Kings	Lost	–
