= J. R. Smith =

American basketball player (born 1985)

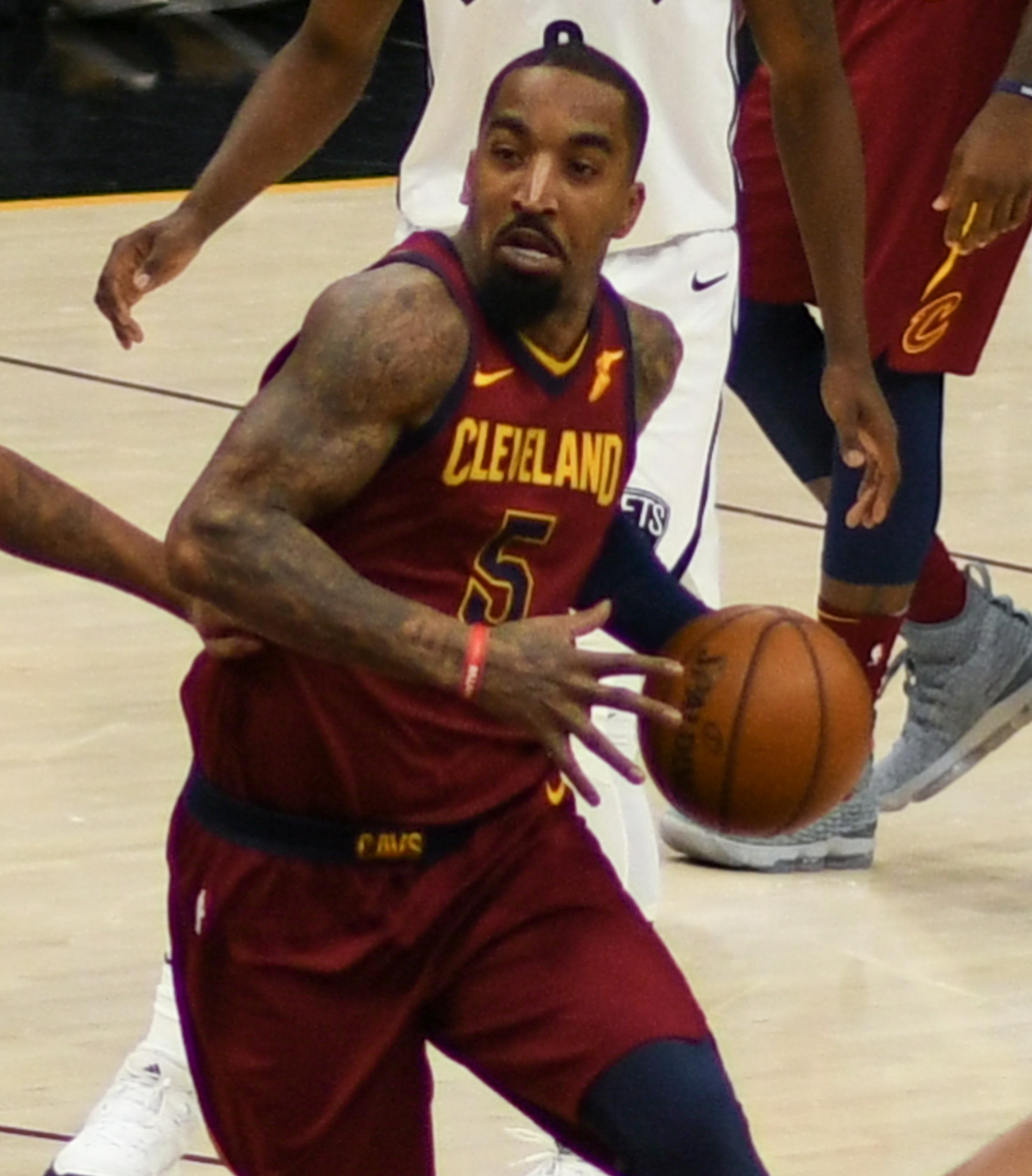
- Smith with the Cleveland Cavaliers in 2018

Personal information
- Born: September 9, 1985 (age 41) Freehold Borough, New Jersey, U.S.
- Listed height: 6 ft 6 in (1.98 m)
- Listed weight: 220 lb (100 kg)

Career information
- High school: Lakewood (Lakewood, New Jersey); St. Benedict's Prep (Newark, New Jersey)
- NBA draft: 2004: 1st round, 18th overall pick
- Drafted by: New Orleans Hornets
- Playing career: 2004–2020
- Position: Shooting guard / small forward
- Number: 23, 1, 5, 8, 21

Career history
- 2004–2006: New Orleans Hornets (Note: During the 2005–06 and 2006–07 seasons, the team was known as the New Orleans/Oklahoma City Hornets during their temporary relocation to Oklahoma City due to Hurricane Katrina.)
- 2006–2011: Denver Nuggets
- 2011–2012: Zhejiang Golden Bulls
- 2012–2015: New York Knicks
- 2015–2019: Cleveland Cavaliers
- 2020: Los Angeles Lakers

Career highlights
- 2× NBA champion (2016, 2020); NBA Sixth Man of the Year (2013); CBA All-Star (2012); CBA scoring champion (2012); McDonald's All-American Game Co-MVP (2004); Second-team Parade All-American (2004)

Career statistics
- Points: 12,148 (12.4 ppg)
- Rebounds: 3,073 (3.1 rpg)
- Assists: 2,077 (2.1 apg)
- Stats at NBA.com
- Stats at Basketball Reference

Earl Joseph "J. R." Smith III (born September 9, 1985) is an American former professional basketball player in the National Basketball Association (NBA). Smith played high school basketball at New Jersey basketball powerhouse Saint Benedict's Preparatory School in Newark. He entered the NBA out of high school after being selected in the first round of the 2004 NBA draft with the 18th overall pick by the New Orleans Hornets. He has also played for the Denver Nuggets, New York Knicks, and the Cleveland Cavaliers as well as for the Zhejiang Golden Bulls of the Chinese Basketball Association (CBA). Smith won two NBA championships, with the Cleveland Cavaliers in 2016 and with the Los Angeles Lakers in 2020.

In 2021, Smith enrolled at North Carolina A&T State University, where he joined their Aggies golf team.

== Early life ==
Born in Freehold Borough, New Jersey, Smith grew up in the Clarksburg section of Millstone Township, New Jersey. He spent five years in high school. A freshman in 1999–2000, Smith went to Steinert High for the first semester and then McCorristin Catholic High for the next, both in New Jersey. Having not competed in sports for either school, he was permitted to transfer to Lakewood High and repeat his freshman year. He played two seasons of basketball for Lakewood before transferring to Saint Benedict's Preparatory School in 2002. Smith was highly rated in football and also played baseball. He focused strictly on basketball as a senior. He committed to play college basketball at North Carolina after a lengthy recruiting battle. However, after winning co-MVP with Dwight Howard at the 2004 McDonald's All-American Game, Smith decided to forgo college and declared for the 2004 NBA draft.

== Professional career ==
=== New Orleans Hornets (2004–2006) ===
Smith was selected by the New Orleans Hornets with the 18th overall pick in the 2004 NBA draft. As a rookie, Smith was named Western Conference Rookie of the Month three times (January, February, March) and participated in the 2005 NBA Slam Dunk Contest, finishing third. After averaging 10.3 points in 76 games (56 starts) as a rookie, he averaged 7.7 points in 55 games (25 starts) in 2005–06. Smith fell out of favor with Hornets coach Byron Scott due to a poor work ethic. He began the 2005–06 season as the starting shooting guard and ended it out of the rotation.

=== Denver Nuggets (2006–2011) ===
On July 14, 2006, Smith was traded, alongside P. J. Brown, to the Chicago Bulls in exchange for Tyson Chandler. Six days later, he was traded again, this time to the Denver Nuggets in exchange for Howard Eisley and two second-round draft picks. During his first season in Denver, Smith served a 10-game NBA suspension from December 18 to January 8 following his involvement in the Knicks/Nuggets melee at New York's Madison Square Garden on December 16. He later missed eight games between February 23 and March 11 while recovering from arthroscopic left knee surgery. After struggling in the first four games of the Nuggets' first-round playoff series against the San Antonio Spurs, including going 0-for-12 from 3-point range, Smith was benched for Game 5 of the series. Nuggets coach George Karl reportedly had had enough of Smith's mistakes throughout the series, compounded by Smith's 3-pointer with 25.7 seconds left in Game 4 with Denver trailing 93–89.

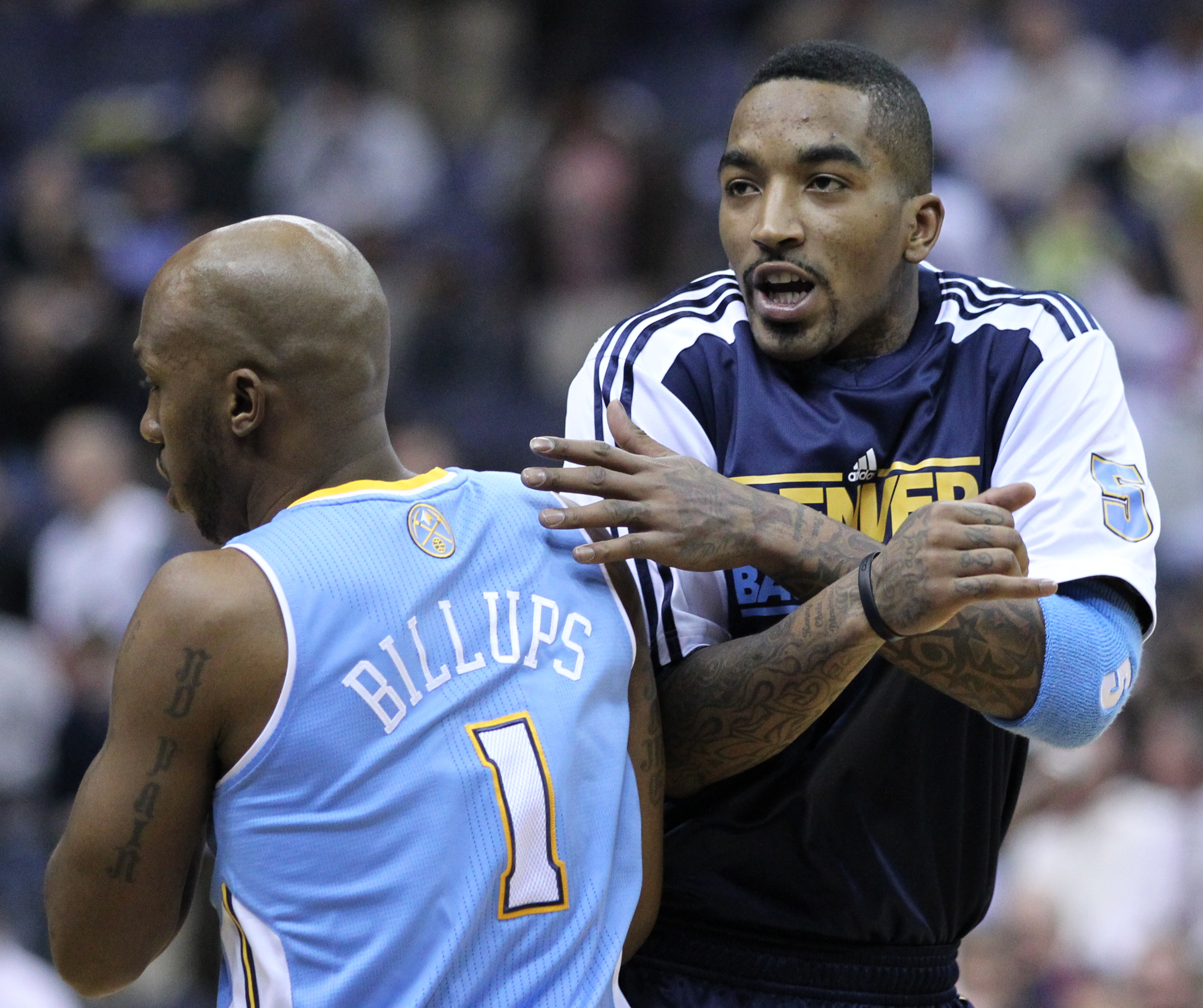
Smith and Chauncey Billups with the Nuggets in January 2011

During the 2007–08 season, Smith established career highs for field goal percentage (.461) and 3-point percentage (.403). During the 2008–09 season, he averaged 15.2 points over 81 games (18 starts), finishing second in voting for the NBA Sixth Man of the Year Award behind Jason Terry. In February 2009, he participated in the NBA Slam Dunk Contest, finishing third. On April 13, 2009, Smith had a career-high 45 points and franchise-best 11 3-pointers to help the Nuggets clinch the Northwest Division title and home-court edge in the playoffs for the first time in 21 years with a 118–98 win over the Sacramento Kings.

On December 23, 2009, Smith scored a season-high 41 points against the Atlanta Hawks, becoming the first NBA player ever to record multiple games of 10+ 3-pointers. He finished the 2009–10 season averaging a then career-high 15.4 points per game. In 2010–11, he averaged 12.3 points and 2.2 assists as the Nuggets' sixth man. Smith's tenure with the Nuggets ended in September 2011 due to the NBA lockout. A fan favorite in Denver for his 3-point shooting and electric dunks, Smith often drew the ire of coach George Karl for his befuddling shot selection.

=== Zhejiang Golden Bulls (2011–2012) ===
In September 2011, due to the NBA lockout, Smith signed a one-year deal with the Zhejiang Golden Bulls of the Chinese Basketball Association (CBA). In accordance with CBA rules, Smith's contract with the Golden Bulls did not include an opt-out clause that would allow him to return to the NBA following the conclusion of the lockout. His deal was estimated to be worth around $3 million, the highest in league history. In 32 games for Zhejiang, he averaged 34.4 points, 7.4 rebounds, 4.1 assists and 2.5 steals per game. On February 1, 2012, he scored a season-high 60 points with 14 3-pointers in a 122–110 win over the Qingdao Eagles. He had four 50+ point games during the season.

=== New York Knicks (2012–2015) ===
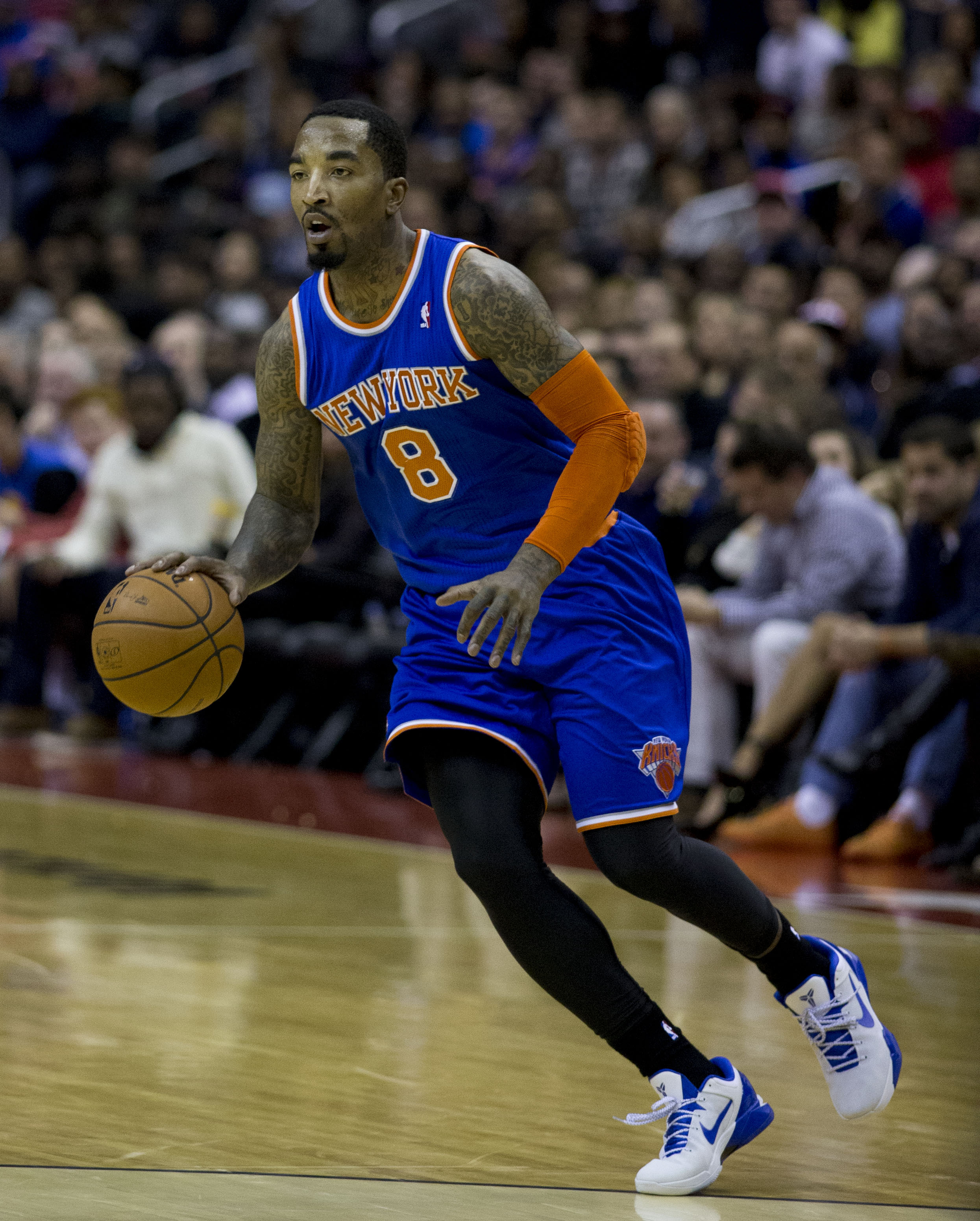
Smith with the Knicks in November 2013

On February 17, 2012, Smith signed with the New York Knicks. He appeared in 35 games for the Knicks to finish the regular season, before appearing in all five of the Knicks' postseason games.

On July 11, 2012, Smith re-signed with the Knicks. In 2012–13, he averaged a career-high 18.1 points, 5.3 rebounds and 2.7 assists over 33.5 minutes in 80 games off the bench. He earned Eastern Conference Player of the Week honors for the period ending March 31, after posting three consecutive 30-point efforts off the bench, becoming the first NBA player to accomplish the feat in over 23 years. He was subsequently named the NBA Sixth Man of the Year, becoming just the third player in franchise history to win the award, joining Anthony Mason and John Starks.

On July 11, 2013, Smith re-signed with the Knicks. He missed the first five games of the 2013–14 season for violating the NBA's anti-drug policy. On March 26, he hit nine 3-pointers against the Sacramento Kings, tying the Knicks' franchise record. On April 4, he scored a season-high 32 points with eight 3-pointers in a 90–89 loss to the Washington Wizards. Two days later, in a 102–91 loss to the Miami Heat, Smith broke an NBA record of 21 three-pointers taken in a single game, a mark set in 2005 by Damon Stoudamire. Smith hit 10 of 22 3-point shots against the Heat, setting a franchise record for 3-pointers made and finishing with 32 points for the second straight game.

=== Cleveland Cavaliers (2015–2019) ===
==== 2014–15 season ====
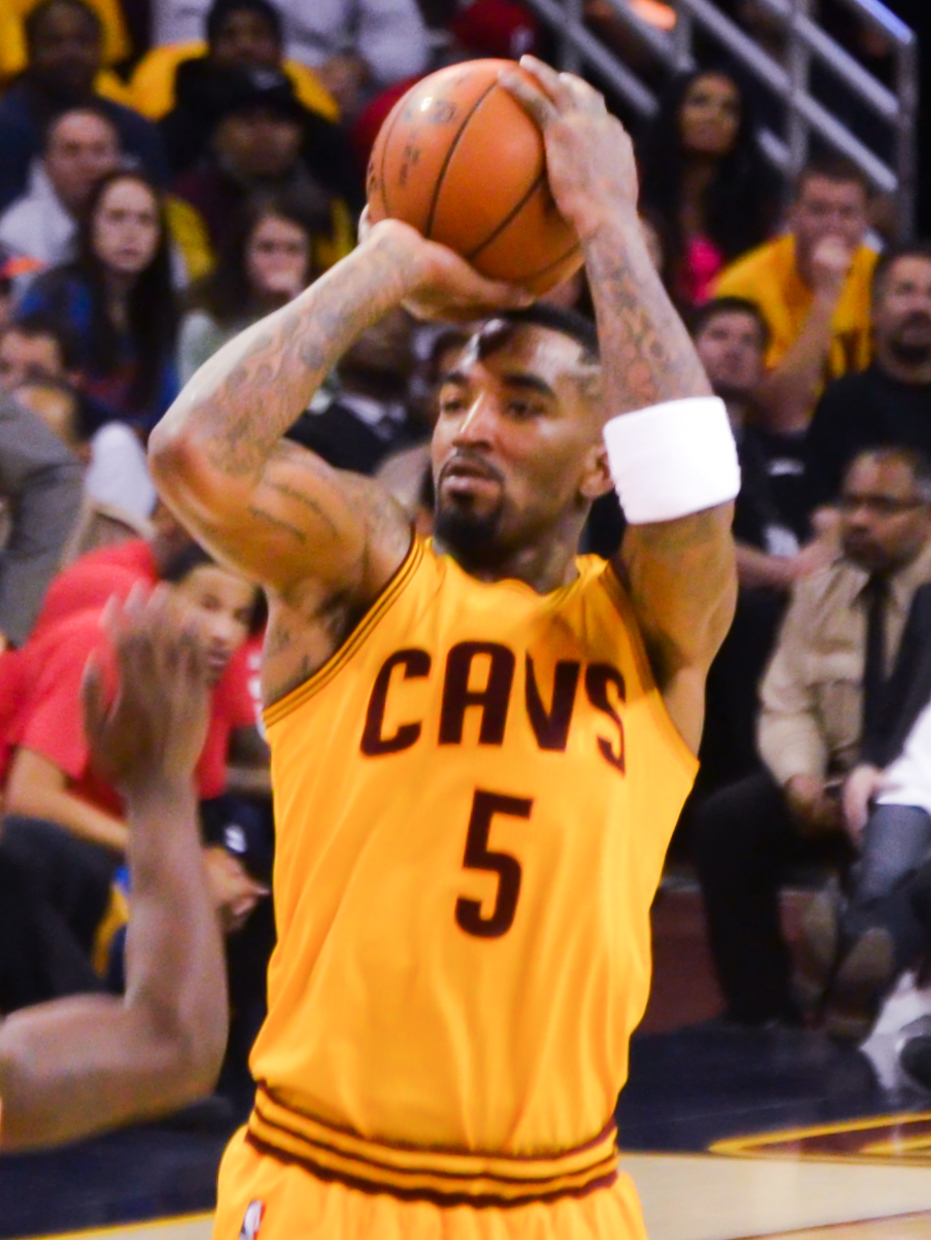
Smith with the Cavaliers in January 2015

On January 5, 2015, Smith was acquired by the Cleveland Cavaliers in a three-team trade that involved the Knicks and the Oklahoma City Thunder. On April 27, 2015, Smith was suspended for the first two games of the Eastern Conference semifinals after he swung his arm and made contact with the head of Celtics forward Jae Crowder in Game 4 of their first-round series against Boston. In Game 1 of the Eastern Conference finals against the Atlanta Hawks, Smith made eight 3-pointers and scored 28 points in a 97–89 victory. He helped the Cavaliers sweep the Hawks to reach the NBA Finals, where they lost to the Golden State Warriors in six games. During Cleveland's NBA Finals run in the 2015 playoffs, Smith appeared in 18 games (four starts), averaging 12.8 points and 4.7 rebounds in 31.1 minutes per game.

==== 2015–16 season: First championship ====
On September 2, 2015, Smith re-signed with the Cavaliers. Smith played in 77 games (all starts) with Cleveland in the 2015–16 regular season, averaging 12.4 points, 2.8 rebounds and 1.1 steals in 30.7 minutes. He ranked seventh in the league in 3-pointers made (204), setting a franchise single-season record. He also shot .400 from beyond the arc, which was tied for 18th-best in the NBA. Smith led Cleveland in steal-to-turnover ratio (1.37) and scored 10 or more points 50 times and 20 or more points 11 times. During Cleveland's playoff run, Smith started in all 21 games, averaging 11.5 points, 3.2 rebounds and 1.2 steals in 34.8 minutes per game. He made a franchise playoff-record 65 3-pointers, which were also the fourth-most threes made by any NBA player in a single postseason. Smith scored in double figures in each of the last five games of the NBA Finals, as Cleveland went 4–1 over that stretch against Golden State and took home the franchise's first NBA title.

==== 2016–17 season ====
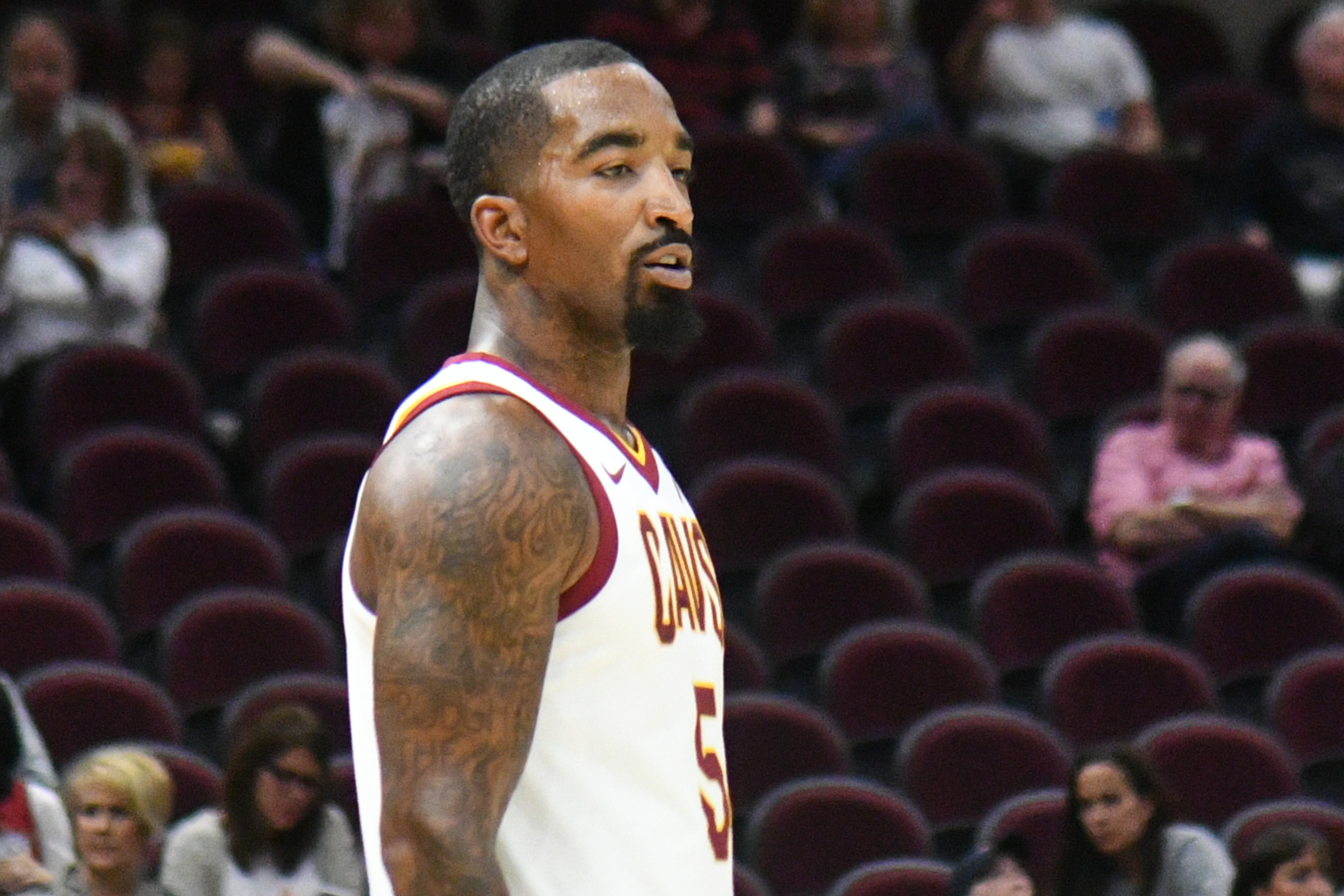
Smith in 2017

On October 15, 2016, Smith re-signed with the Cavaliers. After a contract stalemate that had consumed nearly the first three weeks of training camp, Smith and the Cavaliers reached an agreement on a four-year deal worth $57 million. On November 1, in a win over the Houston Rockets, Smith hit his 344th three-pointer, passing Damon Jones for ninth place on the team's all-time list. On November 18, he hit three 3-pointers against the Detroit Pistons to move past Dirk Nowitzki into 15th place on the NBA's career list for 3-pointers. On December 13, Smith, having been in a season-long shooting slump, scored 17 of his season-high 23 points in the first half of the Cavaliers' 103–86 win over the Memphis Grizzlies. He came into the game shooting a career-low 31 percent from the field and 32 percent on 3-pointers, the lowest mark since his rookie season with New Orleans. He finished the game with 8-of-17 from the field and 6-of-10 on 3s, passing Dale Ellis (1,719) for 14th on the career three-pointer list. On December 20, in a win over the Milwaukee Bucks, Smith suffered a fractured right thumb that required surgery. Three days later, he was ruled out for 12–14 weeks. He made his return to the line-up on March 9 against the Pistons. Smith helped the Cavaliers go 12–1 over the first three rounds of the playoffs to reach the NBA Finals for a third straight season. There the Cavaliers faced the Warriors, but lost the series in five games.

==== 2017–18 season ====
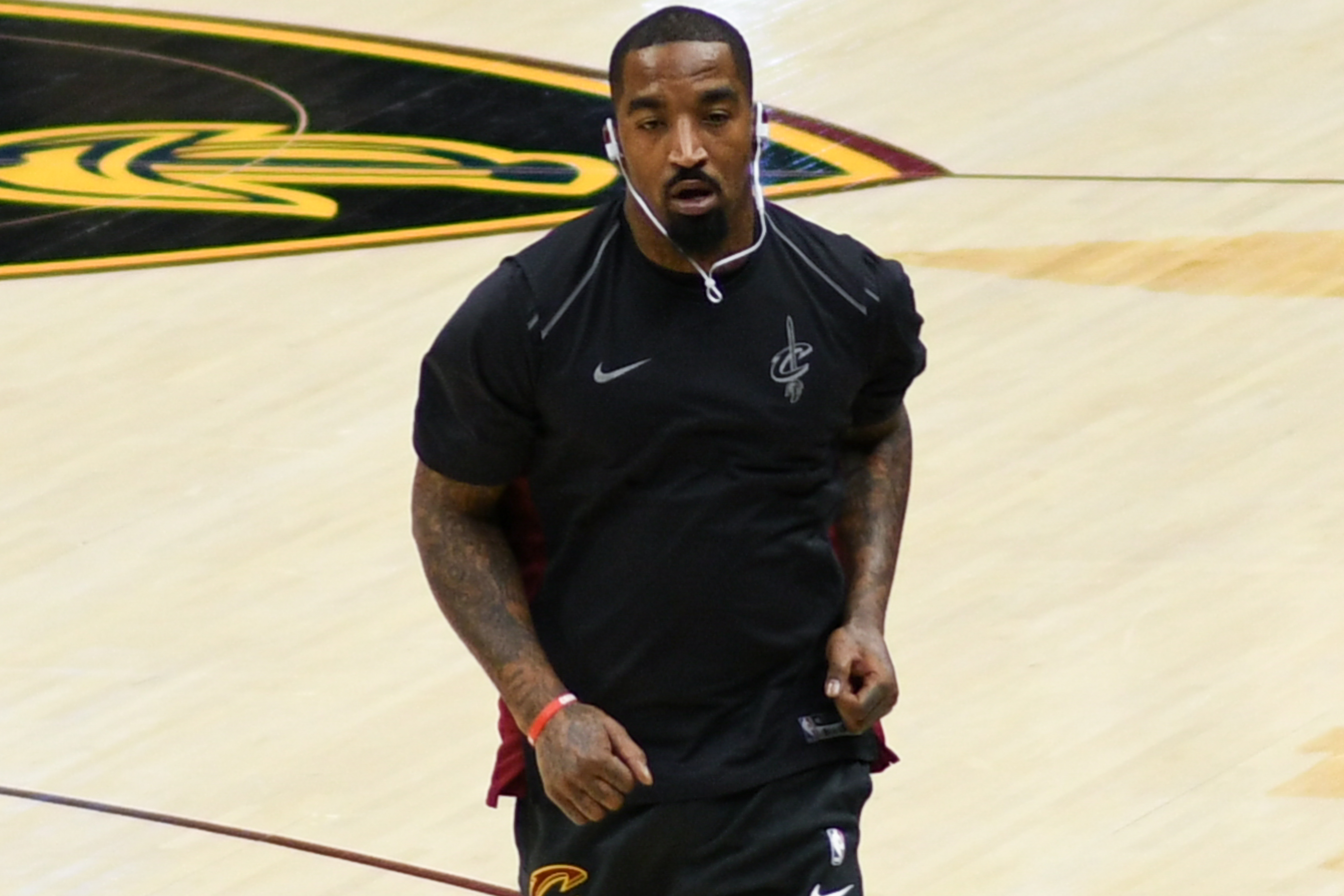
Smith during pre-game warmup in 2018

Smith struggled over the first 10 games of the 2017–18 season. He found his form on November 7, scoring a season-high 20 points on 5-of-7 3-pointers in a 124–119 win over the Milwaukee Bucks, passing Rashard Lewis (1,787) for 14th place on the NBA's career 3-pointers made list. On December 14, in a 121–112 win over the Los Angeles Lakers, Smith passed Chauncey Billups (1,830) for 11th place on the NBA's career 3-pointers made list. On March 2, 2018, Smith was suspended by the Cavaliers for one game for throwing a bowl of soup at assistant coach, Damon Jones. During Game 1 of the NBA Finals against the Warriors, Smith got a free-throw rebound with 4.7 seconds left in regulation time. The game was tied, meaning that a basket would have won the game. Smith, apparently confused and thinking the Cavaliers were leading, attempted to dribble out the clock before realizing his error and frantically passing to George Hill with 1.2 seconds left, in front of a visibly irate LeBron James. The Cavaliers lost 124–114 in overtime. In a post-game interview, Smith initially claimed to have known it was a tie game. He later backtracked, saying: "After thinking about it a lot... I can't say I was sure of anything at that point." The Cavaliers went on to lose the series in a four-game sweep.

==== 2018–19 season ====
Cleveland began 2018–19 with a 2–13 record after LeBron James left the team in free agency for the Lakers. Head coach Tyronn Lue had been fired after an 0–6 start, the team was suffering injuries to All-Star Kevin Love and others, and Smith's role had been reduced. On November 20, 2018, the Cavaliers announced that Smith "will no longer be with team as the organization works with JR and his representation regarding his future." A day earlier, he had accused the team of not trying to win, saying their goal was to "develop [young players] and lose to get lottery picks."

On July 15, 2019, he was waived by the Cavaliers.

=== Los Angeles Lakers (2020) ===
On July 1, 2020, Smith signed with the Los Angeles Lakers for the remainder of the 2019–20 season, reuniting him with former Cavaliers teammate LeBron James. On July 30, he made his debut for the Lakers, recording no points and one foul in a 103–101 win over the Los Angeles Clippers. On August 3, Smith logged his first points for the Lakers, grabbing four points in a 116–108 win over the Utah Jazz. On August 13, he recorded a season-high 11 points, along with one rebound and two assists, in a 122–136 loss to the Sacramento Kings. On August 20, he recorded a playoff-high 11 points, along with two assists, in a 111–88 win over the Portland Trail Blazers. Smith went on to win his second NBA championship when the Lakers defeated the Miami Heat in six games.

== Career statistics ==
Legend
GP	Games played	GS	Games started	MPG	Minutes per game
FG%	Field goal percentage	3P%	3-point field goal percentage	FT%	Free throw percentage
RPG	Rebounds per game	APG	Assists per game	SPG	Steals per game
BPG	Blocks per game	PPG	Points per game	**Bold**	Career high
†	Won an NBA championship

=== NBA ===
==== Regular season ====
Year	Team	GP	GS	MPG	FG%	3P%	FT%	RPG	APG	SPG	BPG	PPG
2004–05	New Orleans	76	56	24.5	.394	.288	.689	2.0	1.9	.7	.1	10.3
2005–06	New Orleans	55	25	18.0	.393	.371	.822	2.0	1.1	.7	.1	7.7
2006–07	Denver	63	24	23.3	.441	.390	.810	2.3	1.4	.8	.1	13.0
2007–08	Denver	74	0	19.2	**.461**	**.403**	.719	2.1	1.7	.8	.2	12.3
2008–09	Denver	**81**	18	27.7	.446	.397	.754	3.7	2.8	1.0	.2	15.2
2009–10	Denver	75	0	27.8	.414	.338	.706	3.1	2.4	1.3	.3	15.4
2010–11	Denver	79	6	24.9	.435	.390	.738	4.1	2.2	1.2	.2	12.3
2011–12	New York	35	1	27.6	.407	.337	.709	3.9	2.4	**1.5**	.2	12.5
2012–13	New York	80	0	**33.5**	.422	.356	.762	**5.3**	2.7	1.3	.3	**18.1**
2013–14	New York	74	37	32.7	.415	.394	.652	4.0	3.0	.9	.3	14.5
2014–15	New York	24	6	25.8	.402	.356	.692	2.4	**3.4**	.8	.2	10.9
2014–15	Cleveland	46	45	31.8	.425	.390	.818	3.5	2.5	1.4	**.4**	12.7
2015–16†	Cleveland	77	**77**	30.7	.415	.400	.634	2.8	1.7	1.1	.3	12.4
2016–17	Cleveland	41	35	29.0	.346	.351	.667	2.8	1.5	1.0	.3	8.6
2017–18	Cleveland	80	61	28.1	.403	.375	.696	2.9	1.8	.9	.1	8.3
2018–19	Cleveland	11	4	20.2	.342	.308	.800	1.6	1.9	1.0	.3	6.7
2019–20†	L.A. Lakers	6	0	13.2	.318	.091	**1.000**	.8	.5	.2	.0	2.8
Career		977	395	26.9	.419	.373	.733	3.1	2.1	1.0	.2	12.4

==== Playoffs ====
Year	Team	GP	GS	MPG	FG%	3P%	FT%	RPG	APG	SPG	BPG	PPG
2007	Denver	4	0	11.8	.273	.000	**1.000**	2.3	.5	1.0	.3	4.5
2008	Denver	4	0	27.0	**.535**	.318	.833	1.8	1.8	1.0	.0	**18.3**
2009	Denver	16	0	27.2	.454	.358	.543	3.3	**2.8**	1.1	.3	14.9
2010	Denver	6	0	26.5	.368	.355	.875	3.8	1.7	.7	.3	11.2
2011	Denver	5	0	15.2	.356	.429	.727	2.0	1.0	.4	.0	9.8
2012	New York	5	0	**35.0**	.316	.179	**1.000**	2.6	2.2	**1.2**	.2	12.2
2013	New York	11	0	31.9	.331	.273	.721	**4.7**	1.4	1.0	.5	14.3
2015	Cleveland	18	4	31.1	.403	.359	.700	**4.7**	1.2	0.9	**.6**	12.8
2016†	Cleveland	21	**21**	34.5	.459	.429	.619	3.2	1.4	**1.2**	.2	11.5
2017	Cleveland	18	18	27.1	.505	**.500**	.455	2.3	.7	.7	.3	8.1
2018	Cleveland	**22**	**21**	32.1	.348	.367	.773	2.7	1.1	1.0	.2	8.7
2020†	L.A. Lakers	10	0	7.5	.269	.273	.000	.3	.3	.2	.0	2.0
Career		140	64	27.9	.397	.367	.706	3.0	1.3	.9	.3	10.7

=== CBA ===
Year	Team	GP	GS	MPG	FG%	3P%	FT%	RPG	APG	SPG	BPG	PPG
2011–12	Zhejiang	32	8	36.4	.517	.478	.758	7.4	4.1	2.5	.1	34.4

== College golf ==
On August 11, 2021, it was reported that Smith enrolled at North Carolina A&T State University, aiming for a degree in liberal studies and planning to join the Aggies golf team. He graduated in 2026. The university announced on October 8, 2021, that Smith had qualified to play in the Aggies' upcoming tournament, the Phoenix Invitational hosted by nearby Elon University, on October 11 and 12. Under team rules, all golfers must qualify for regular-season tournaments in practice unless they were among the team's top two golfers in its previous tournament. Smith qualified for the Phoenix Invitational by one stroke, shooting rounds of 83 and 78 (respectively 12 and 7 over par) on the event's first day. Smith was named the North Carolina A&T Academic Athlete of the Year for 2021–2022 with a 4.0 GPA. Smith's time with the men's golf team is the focus of the 2023 docuseries Redefined: J. R. Smith.

Smith was supposed to compete in the inaugural Internet Invitational, but missed the event at the last minute and had to be replaced by Lacy Snell, an employee of Big Cedar Lodge golf resort.

Smith graduated from North Carolina A&T State University in May 2026, earning a Bachelor of Arts in Liberal Studies with a concentration in Applied Cultural Thought.

== Esports ==
In 2021, J.R Smith signed with Complexity Gaming, and he has also played Warzone tournaments.

== Personal life ==
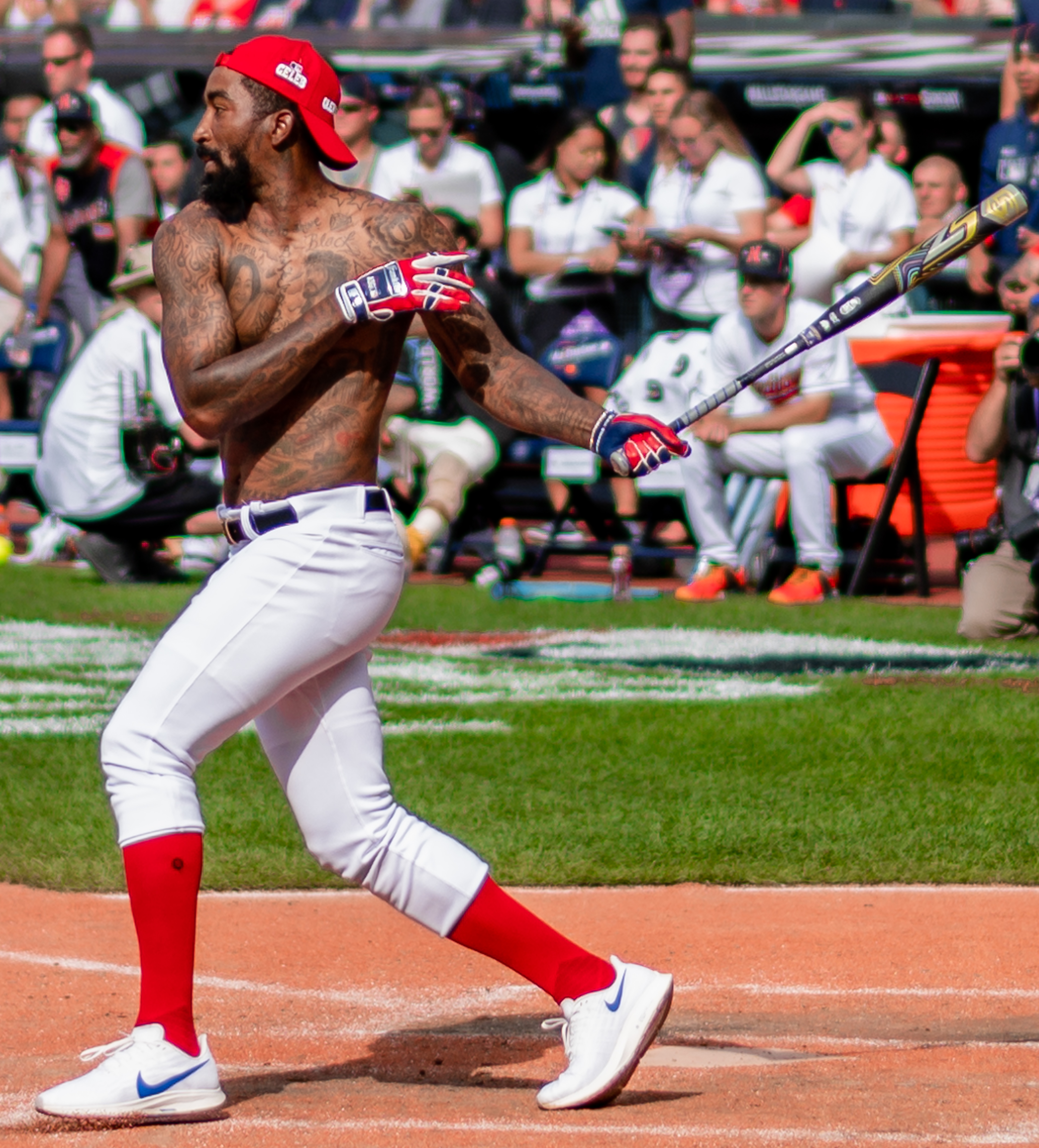
Smith playing for Team Cleveland at the 2019 All-Star Legends & Celebrity Softball Game at Progressive Field in Cleveland

In 2012, The New York Times described Smith as perhaps the most heavily tattooed player in the NBA. He said that he got his first tattoo at 15 years old, has been in "[p]robably a thousand" tattoo parlors as of December 2012 and had lost count of his number of tattoos "around 70-something." In June 2016, a Cleveland clothing company began selling a T-shirt which reproduced Smith's torso and upper arm tattoos.

In November 2016, Smith appeared on stage with his family at a Cleveland rally for the Hillary Clinton 2016 presidential campaign to endorse Clinton's candidacy for the 2016 United States presidential election.

Smith modeled for Nike and Supreme in 2018. He subsequently had the Supreme logo tattooed on his calf. Smith has dyslexia.

=== Family ===
Smith is the son of Ida and Earl Smith, and has three brothers and two sisters. His younger brother Chris briefly played alongside him on the Knicks in 2013–14. His younger brother Dimitrius played football at Monmouth University.

In August 2016, Smith married Jewel Harris; the couple have three daughters together. Smith has one daughter from a previous relationship. Their second daughter together was born in January 2017, weighing one pound at birth. Former teammates Carmelo Anthony and Chris Paul are the godfathers of his first two daughters. On September 27, 2024, he welcomed a son with actress Candice Patton.

=== Controversies ===
On June 9, 2007, Smith and two passengers were injured in a car accident on Stagecoach Road in Millstone Township, New Jersey, when the SUV he was driving collided with another car. Smith and a passenger, Andre Bell, were ejected from the vehicle at around 5:30 p.m. Smith's vehicle went through a stop sign and collided with the other car. Smith was taken to Jersey Shore University Hospital. Bell suffered serious head injuries before being pronounced dead on the night of June 11. Neither Smith nor the second passenger suffered life-threatening injuries. Smith and Bell were not wearing seatbelts at the time. In October 2008, a grand jury in Monmouth County, New Jersey, declined to indict Smith on a vehicular manslaughter charge stemming from the accident.

On June 30, 2009, Smith pleaded guilty to a lesser charge of reckless driving in relation to the June 2007 accident. Smith was initially sentenced to 90 days in a Monmouth County (N.J.) jail, but 60 of those days were suspended, on the condition that he complete 500 hours of community service. On July 31, 2009, The Denver Post reported that Smith was released from jail after serving 24 days of his sentence.

On August 5, 2009, Smith suspended his Twitter account after he was accused of writing in a way that reflected the Bloods gang, specifically replacing his c's with k's.

On August 28, 2009, Smith was suspended seven games for the 2009–10 NBA season in response to his guilty plea to a reckless driving charge related to the fatal 2007 accident. The NBA also cited his poor driving record as grounds for the suspension. Smith's driving record included five suspensions in eight months, but was "in good standing" at the time of the crash in New Jersey. He was required to pay restoration fees and fines. Smith totaled 27 points against his record from April 2005 to January 2006, including eight violations on seven different days. Five citations were for speeding. Since the accident, he has received two more speeding tickets and three license suspensions in New Jersey.

In March 2012, Smith was fined $25,000 by the NBA for posting a picture of model Tahiry Jose on his Twitter account. In May 2012, Smith was arrested in Miami Beach, Florida for failing to appear in court in 2011 after he was cited for operating a motor scooter with no valid license. The following month, he sued his former team, the Zhejiang Golden Bulls, for $1 million after the team withheld that amount from his salary claiming he missed many practices and faked an injury.

In September 2018, the NBA threatened to fine Smith if he appeared in a game without covering up the Supreme logo tattooed on his leg. Smith initially resisted but, after talking with National Basketball Players Association officials, eventually agreed to hide the tattoo.

On May 31, 2020, Smith was seen on video allegedly attacking another man. The man was allegedly participating in the George Floyd protests and had allegedly broken Smith's truck window with his skateboard. Smith claimed in a video to have chased the man down and "whooped his ass" because he "broke his shit", and he referred to the man as a "motherfucking white boy."

In September 2026, Smith was arrested on an assault charge which involved "body injury family violence."

== See also ==
- List of NBA career 3-point scoring leaders
- List of NBA career playoff 3-point scoring leaders
- List of NBA single-game 3-point field goal leaders
- List of people banned or suspended by the NBA
