= Joey Dorsey =

American basketball player (born 1983)

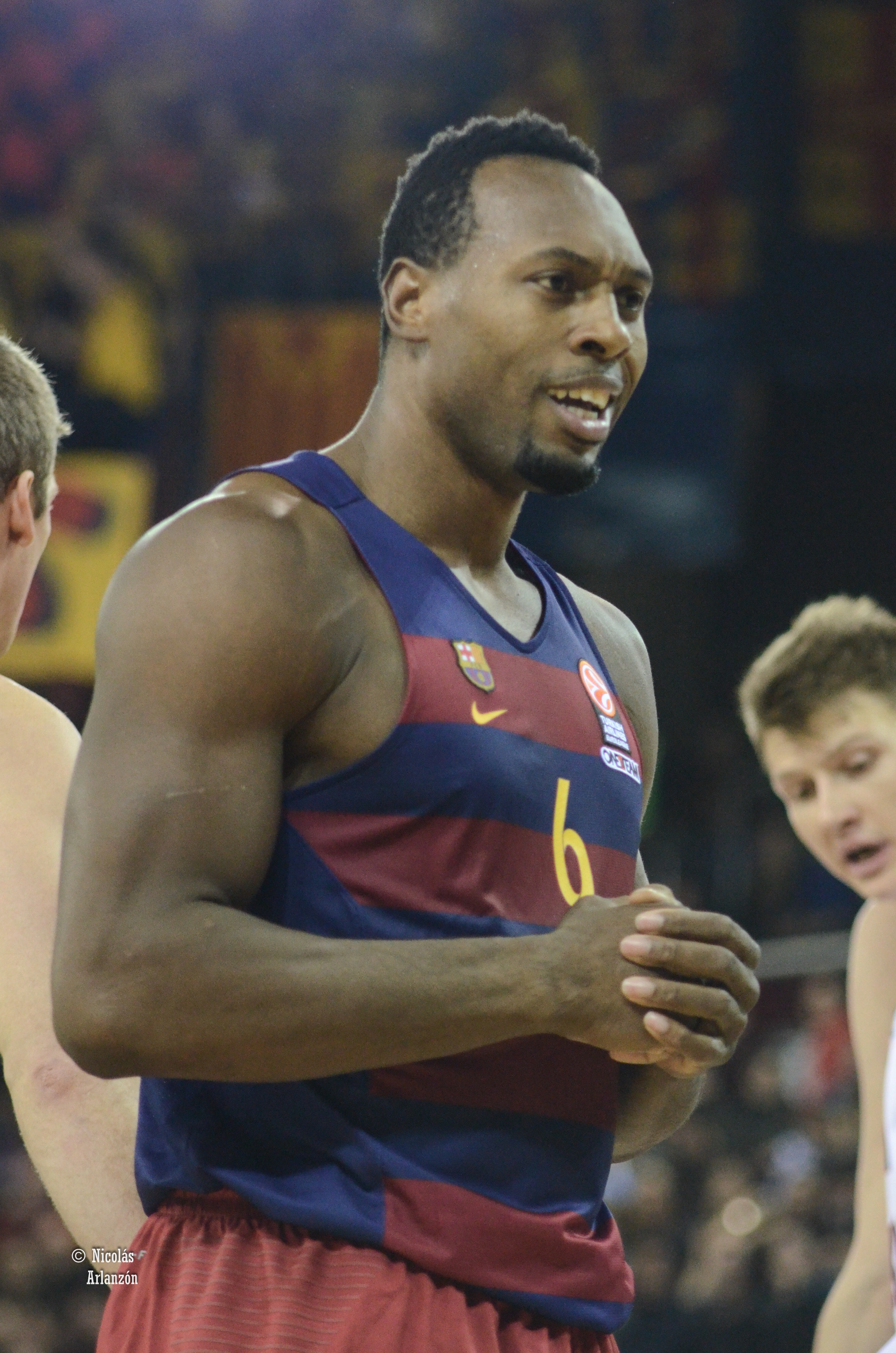
- Dorsey in 2016

Minnesota Timberwolves
- Title: Player development assistant
- League: NBA

Personal information
- Born: December 16, 1983 (age 42) Baltimore, Maryland, U.S.
- Listed height: 6 ft 9 in (2.06 m)
- Listed weight: 275 lb (125 kg)

Career information
- High school: Frederick Douglass (Baltimore, Maryland); Laurinburg Institute (Laurinburg, North Carolina)
- College: Memphis (2004–2008)
- NBA draft: 2008: 2nd round, 33rd overall pick
- Drafted by: Portland Trail Blazers
- Playing career: 2008–2022
- Position: Power forward / center
- Coaching career: 2024–present

Career history

Playing
- 2008–2010: Houston Rockets
- 2008–2010: →Rio Grande Valley Vipers
- 2010: Sacramento Kings
- 2010–2011: Toronto Raptors
- 2011–2012: Caja Laboral
- 2012: Olympiacos
- 2012–2013: Gaziantep
- 2013–2014: Barcelona
- 2014–2015: Houston Rockets
- 2015–2016: Galatasaray
- 2016–2017: Barcelona
- 2017: Best Balıkesir
- 2018–2019: Panionios
- 2019–2020: Mitteldeutscher
- 2020: Apollon Limassol
- 2021: APOP Paphos B.C.

Coaching
- 2024–present: Minnesota Timberwolves (player development assistant)

Career highlights
- EuroLeague champion (2012); Greek League champion (2012); Greek League Defensive Player of the Year (2012); Turkish Super League rebounding leader (2013); Turkish Super League All-Star Game MVP (2013); Turkish Super League All-Star (2012)
- Stats at NBA.com
- Stats at Basketball Reference

Richard Elmer "Joey" Dorsey (born December 16, 1983) is an American former professional basketball player and coach, currently working for the Minnesota Timberwolves of the National Basketball Association (NBA) as a player development coach. He played college basketball for the University of Memphis.

== College career ==
During both his sophomore and junior years on the team, the Tigers ended their season in the NCAA tournament's Elite Eight.

However, during his senior year Dorsey led the Memphis Tigers to the 2008 NCAA Men's Division I Basketball Tournament championship game with Derrick Rose and Chris Douglas-Roberts. The Tigers fell to Kansas 75–68 in overtime.

== Professional career ==
=== Houston Rockets ===
Dorsey was chosen as the 33rd overall pick in the 2008 NBA draft by the Portland Trail Blazers. After the draft, he was traded to the Houston Rockets in exchange for the draft rights to the 25th pick, Nicolas Batum. In the 2008–09 NBA season, Dorsey played in 3 games, scoring a total of 2 points, grabbing one rebound, and making one assist.

The Rockets assigned Dorsey to the Rio Grande Valley Vipers of the NBA Development League. On February 5, 2010, after previously being called back up from the NBDL, Dorsey played a career-high 19 minutes and grabbed 12 rebounds.

=== Sacramento Kings / Toronto Raptors ===
On February 18, 2010, Dorsey was traded to the Sacramento Kings in a three team deal that also moved the Rockets' Tracy McGrady to the New York Knicks. On March 28, 2010, he was waived by the Kings.

On April 4, 2010, Dorsey was signed to a non-guaranteed contract by the Raptors.

=== Europe ===
In September 2011, Dorsey signed a one-year deal with the Spanish League club Caja Laboral. On January 10, 2012, he parted ways with Caja Laboral. The next day, he signed with the Greek League club Olympiacos for the rest of the season. With Olympiacos, he won the 2011–12 EuroLeague championship, as well as the 2011–12 Greek League championship. In August 2012, he re-signed with Olympiacos on a two-year deal. On September 12, 2012, during a preseason exhibition game against Dinamo Sassari, Dorsey ended up shattering a backboard, with around two minutes left in the fourth quarter.

On November 7, 2012, Dorsey was released by Olympiacos, ending their relationship two weeks after he criticized the organization, and he stopped playing with the team. On November 22, 2012, he signed with Turkish club Royal Halı Gaziantep for the rest of the 2012–13 Turkish Basketball League season.

On July 17, 2013, Dorsey signed a one-year deal (with the option of a second) with the Spanish club FC Barcelona.

=== Return to the NBA ===
On July 19, 2014, Dorsey signed with the Houston Rockets. On January 21, 2015, he had a season-best game with seven points and 12 rebounds in a loss to the Golden State Warriors.

On July 20, 2015, the Rockets traded Dorsey, Nick Johnson, Kostas Papanikolaou, Pablo Prigioni, a 2016 first round draft pick, and cash considerations to the Denver Nuggets in exchange for Ty Lawson and a 2017 second round draft pick. On August 18, 2015, he was waived by the Nuggets in a buyout deal.

=== Return to Europe ===
On August 29, 2015, Dorsey signed a one-year, $650,000 net income contract with Turkish club Galatasaray. On February 19, 2016, he left Galatasaray, and returned to his former club, FC Barcelona, for the rest of the season.

On August 17, 2016, Dorsey signed a two-year contract extension with Barcelona. On January 18, 2017, he was released from the team due to disciplinary reasons.

On February 13, 2017, Dorsey signed with Turkish Super League club Best Balıkesir for the rest of the 2016–17 BSL season.

On November 2, 2018, Dorsey returned to Greek Basket League after six years, penning a deal with Panionios B.C. until the end of the 2018–19 season. Dorsey made 20 appearances and averaged 9 points and 8.8 rebounds in 22 minutes per game, helping Panionios to get some crucial victories in order to avoid relegation.

On November 29, 2019, he has signed with Syntainics MBC of the Basketball Bundesliga. Dorsey parted ways with the team on July 21, 2020. He signed with Apollon Limassol of the Cypriot League on September 10. On September 4, 2021, Dorsey signed with APOP Paphos B.C. of the Cyprus Basketball Division A.

=== Coaching career ===
On August 9, 2024, the Minnesota Timberwolves announced the hiring of Joey Dorsey to serve as Player Development Assistant under head coach Chris Finch. He was then sent to be an Assistant Coach for the Iowa Wolves for the 2024-25 NBA G-League Season.

== Awards and accomplishments ==
=== College career ===
- Conference USA All-Freshman Team: (2004–05)
- Conference USA All-Tournament Team: (2006)
- All-Conference USA First-Team: (2006–07)
- Conference USA All-Defensive Team: (2006–07)
- Conference USA Defensive Player of the Year: (2006–07)
- Conference USA All-Tournament Team: (2007)

=== Professional career ===
- EuroLeague Champion: (2012)
- Greek League Champion: (2012)
- Greek League Best Defender: (2012)
- BSL Rebounds Leader (2013)

== Career statistics ==
Legend
GP	Games played	GS	Games started	MPG	Minutes per game
FG%	Field-goal percentage	3P%	3-point field-goal percentage	FT%	Free-throw percentage
RPG	Rebounds per game	APG	Assists per game	SPG	Steals per game
BPG	Blocks per game	PPG	Points per game	PIR	Performance index rating
**Bold**	Career high

=== NBA ===
==== Regular season ====
Year	Team	GP	GS	MPG	FG%	3P%	FT%	RPG	APG	SPG	BPG	PPG
2008–09	Houston	3	0	2.0	.500	–	.000	.3	.3	.0	.0	.7
2009–10	Houston	7	0	7.7	.455	–	**.500**	3.6	.3	.3	.1	1.6
2009–10	Sacramento	8	0	6.5	.444	–	.400	2.3	.0	.1	.1	1.5
2010–11	Toronto	43	9	12.1	.525	–	.477	**4.4**	**.6**	**.6**	**.4**	**3.1**
2014–15	Houston	**69**	**17**	**12.4**	**.552**	.000	.289	4.0	.4	**.6**	**.4**	2.7
Career		130	26	11.5	.534	.000	.375	3.9	.4	.5	.3	2.6

==== Playoffs ====
Year	Team	GP	GS	MPG	FG%	3P%	FT%	RPG	APG	SPG	BPG	PPG
2015	Houston	6	0	2.2	.000	–	.500	.7	.3	.0	.0	.2

=== NBA D-League ===
==== Regular season ====
Year	Team	GP	GS	MPG	FG%	3P%	FT%	RPG	APG	SPG	BPG	PPG
2008–09	Rio Grande Valley	7	5	29.4	.628	–	.389	9.0	1.0	1.0	**1.6**	9.7
2009–10	Rio Grande Valley	**16**	**16**	**31.4**	**.647**	–	**.500**	**13.3**	**1.7**	**1.1**	1.4	**14.9**
Career		23	21	30.8	.642	–	.468	12.0	1.5	1.1	1.4	13.3

=== EuroLeague ===
†	Denotes seasons in which Dorsey won the EuroLeague

Year	Team	GP	GS	MPG	FG%	3P%	FT%	RPG	APG	SPG	BPG	PPG	PIR
2011–12†	Baskonia	6	3	9.0	.455	—	**1.000**	2.7	.2	.2	.3	2.0	2.5
2011–12†	Olympiacos	11	**11**	**17.6**	.641	.000	.391	5.3	**.8**	.9	**1.1**	5.4	7.0
2012–13†	Olympiacos	3	3	13.3	.444	.000	.500	4.3	.3	.7	.3	3.3	2.0
2013–14	Barcelona	**29**	1	15.3	.667	—	.443	5.9	.7	.6	**1.1**	5.3	9.5
2015–16	Barcelona	9	6	17.0	**.741**	—	.308	**7.0**	**.8**	**1.2**	.7	5.3	**10.4**
2016–17	Barcelona	17	0	17.2	.548	—	.568	6.3	**.8**	.5	.3	**5.5**	8.1
Career		75	24	15.7	.623	.000	.456	5.7	.7	.7	.8	5.0	8.1

== Personal life ==
Dorsey is the son of Charlene Dorsey, and has a younger sister named Candice. He also has three daughters in the United States.

== See also ==
- List of NCAA Division I men's basketball players with 145 games played
