= 2014–15 Houston Rockets season =

- Division champions
- Head coach: Kevin McHale
- General manager: Daryl Morey
- Owners: Leslie Alexander
- Arena: Toyota Center

Results
- Record: 56–26 (.683)
- Place: Division: 1st (Southwest); Conference: 2nd (Western)
- Playoff finish: Western Conference Finals (lost to Warriors 1–4)
- Stats at Basketball Reference

Local media
- Television: Root Sports Southwest
- Radio: Sportstalk 790

The 2014–15 Houston Rockets season was the 48th season of the franchise in the National Basketball Association (NBA), and the 44th in the Houston area.

The Rockets finished the regular season with a 56–26 record, the third best in franchise history. They also won their first ever Southwest Division title and first Division crown since 1994. The Rockets beat the Dallas Mavericks 4–1 in the first round, advancing to the Western Conference semifinals for the first time since 2009. They beat the Los Angeles Clippers in seven games after trailing the series 3–1, advancing to the Western Conference finals for the first time since 1997. They became just the ninth team in NBA history to come back from such a deficit. The Rockets' season ended with a 4–1 loss in the Western Conference finals to the eventual NBA champion Golden State Warriors.

== Draft picks ==
Round	Pick	Player	Position	Nationality	College/Team
1	25	Clint Capela	PF/C	Switzerland	Élan Chalon (France)
2	42	Nick Johnson	PG/SG	United States	Arizona

== Standings ==
Southwest Division	W	L	PCT	GB	Home	Road	Div	GP
y-Houston Rockets	56	26	.683	–	30‍–‍11	26‍–‍15	8–8	82
x-Memphis Grizzlies	55	27	.671	1.0	31‍–‍10	24‍–‍17	9–7	82
x-San Antonio Spurs	55	27	.671	1.0	33‍–‍8	22‍–‍19	8–8	82
x-Dallas Mavericks	50	32	.610	6.0	27‍–‍14	23‍–‍18	7–9	82
x-New Orleans Pelicans	45	37	.549	11.0	28‍–‍13	17‍–‍24	8–8	82

Western Conference
#	Team	W	L	PCT	GB	GP
1	z-Golden State Warriors *	67	15	.817	–	82
2	y-Houston Rockets *	56	26	.683	11.0	82
3	x-Los Angeles Clippers	56	26	.683	11.0	82
4	y-Portland Trail Blazers *	51	31	.622	16.0	82
5	x-Memphis Grizzlies	55	27	.671	12.0	82
6	x-San Antonio Spurs	55	27	.671	12.0	82
7	x-Dallas Mavericks	50	32	.610	17.0	82
8	x-New Orleans Pelicans	45	37	.549	22.0	82
9	Oklahoma City Thunder	45	37	.549	22.0	82
10	Phoenix Suns	39	43	.476	28.0	82
11	Utah Jazz	38	44	.463	29.0	82
12	Denver Nuggets	30	52	.366	37.0	82
13	Sacramento Kings	29	53	.354	38.0	82
14	Los Angeles Lakers	21	61	.256	46.0	82
15	Minnesota Timberwolves	16	66	.195	51.0	82

== Game log ==
=== Preseason ===
2014 pre-season game log
Total: 6–2 (home: 4–0; road: 2–2)
Pre-season: 6–2 (home: 4–0; road: 2–2)

Game	Date	Team	Score	High points	High rebounds	High assists	Location Attendance	Record
1	October 7	@ Dallas	W 111–108	Donatas Motiejūnas (18)	Howard, Papanikolaou (6)	Patrick Beverley (4)	American Airlines Center; 17,227	1–0
2	October 9	Memphis	W 113–93	James Harden (21)	Tarik Black (15)	Harden, Johnson (4)	Toyota Center; 15,301	2–0
3	October 13	Phoenix	W 95–92	Terrence Jones (18)	Black, Jones (7)	Isaiah Canaan (3)	Toyota Center; 14,642	3–0
4	October 14	@ New Orleans	L 98–117	Canaan, Papanikolaou (13)	Ariza, Black (5)	Ariza, Beverley, Smith (3)	Toyota Center; 14,266	3–1
5	October 19	Golden State	W 90–83	James Harden (15)	Dorsey, Howard (8)	James Harden (6)	State Farm Arena; 5,647	4–1
6	October 21	@ Miami	L 85–90	Harden, Howard (19)	Donatas Motiejūnas (10)	Beverley, Smith (3)	American Airlines Arena; 19,600	4–2
7	October 22	@ Orlando	W 90–89	Canaan, Daniels (14)	Black, Jones (8)	Kostas Papanikolaou (5)	Amway Center; 14,742	5–2
8	October 24	San Antonio	W 96–87	James Harden (25)	Terrence Jones (13)	Kostas Papanikolaou (4)	Toyota Center; 18,305	6–2

2014–15 season schedule

=== Regular season ===
2014–15 game log
Total: 56–26 (home: 30–11; road: 26–15)
October: 2–0 (home: 0–0; road: 2–0)

Game	Date	Team	Score	High points	High rebounds	High assists	Location Attendance	Record
1	October 28	@ L.A. Lakers	W 108–90	James Harden (32)	Terrence Jones (13)	James Harden (6)	Staples Center; 18,997	1–0
2	October 29	@ Utah	W 104–93	Dwight Howard (22)	Dwight Howard (10)	James Harden (10)	EnergySolutions Arena; 19,911	2–0

November: 11–4 (home: 6–3; road: 5–1)

Game	Date	Team	Score	High points	High rebounds	High assists	Location Attendance	Record
3	November 1	Boston	W 104–90	James Harden (26)	Terrence Jones (10)	James Harden (6)	Toyota Center; 18,309	3–0
4	November 3	@ Philadelphia	W 104–93	James Harden (35)	Dwight Howard (14)	Trevor Ariza (7)	Wells Fargo Center; 12,896	4–0
5	November 4	@ Miami	W 108–91	Dwight Howard (26)	Dwight Howard (10)	James Harden (10)	American Airlines Arena; 19,666	5–0
6	November 6	San Antonio	W 98–81	Dwight Howard (32)	Dwight Howard (16)	James Harden (6)	Toyota Center; 18,311	6–0
7	November 8	Golden State	L 87–98	James Harden (22)	Trevor Ariza (11)	James Harden (7)	Toyota Center; 18,312	6–1
8	November 12	@ Minnesota	W 113–101	James Harden (23)	Dwight Howard (10)	James Harden (10)	Mexico City Arena; 18,996	7–1
9	November 14	Philadelphia	W 88–87	James Harden (35)	Dwight Howard (16)	James Harden (7)	Toyota Center; 18,138	8–1
10	November 16	@ Oklahoma City	W 69–65	James Harden (19)	Harden, Howard, Motiejūnas (9)	James Harden (5)	Chesapeake Energy Arena; 18,203	9–1
11	November 17	@ Memphis	L 93–119	Trevor Ariza (16)	Dwight Howard (9)	Kostas Papanikolaou (5)	FedExForum; 17,012	9–2
12	November 19	L.A. Lakers	L 92–98	James Harden (24)	Tarik Black (9)	James Harden (7)	Toyota Center; 18,245	9–3
13	November 22	Dallas	W 95–92	James Harden (32)	Donatas Motiejūnas (12)	Jason Terry (5)	Toyota Center; 18,244	10–3
14	November 24	New York	W 91–86	James Harden (36)	Donatas Motiejūnas (8)	James Harden (6)	Toyota Center; 18,133	11–3
15	November 26	Sacramento	W 102–89	James Harden (26)	James Harden (7)	James Harden (8)	Toyota Center; 18,058	12–3
16	November 28	L.A. Clippers	L 85–102	James Harden (16)	Tarik Black (9)	James Harden (6)	Toyota Center; 18,226	12–4
17	November 29	@ Milwaukee	W 117–103	James Harden (34)	Trevor Ariza (10)	James Harden (8)	BMO Harris Bradley Center; 16,119	13–4

December: 9–5 (home: 5–3; road: 4–2)

Game	Date	Team	Score	High points	High rebounds	High assists	Location Attendance	Record
18	December 3	Memphis	W 105–96	James Harden (21)	Tarik Black (11)	Jason Terry (5)	Toyota Center; 18,151	14–4
19	December 5	@ Minnesota	W 114–112 (OT)	James Harden (38)	Trevor Ariza (9)	Harden, Terry (6)	Target Center; 12,101	15–4
20	December 6	Phoenix	W 100–95	Ariza, Beverley (19)	James Harden (12)	James Harden (7)	Toyota Center; 18,060	16–4
21	December 10	@ Golden State	L 93–105	James Harden (34)	James Harden (8)	Patrick Beverley (5)	Oracle Arena; 19,596	16–5
22	December 11	@ Sacramento	W 113–109 (OT)	James Harden (44)	Patrick Beverley (10)	James Harden (8)	Sleep Train Arena; 16,676	17–5
23	December 13	Denver	W 108–96	Dwight Howard (26)	Dwight Howard (13)	James Harden (10)	Toyota Center; 18,136	18–5
24	December 17	@ Denver	W 115–111 (OT)	James Harden (41)	Dwight Howard (16)	James Harden (10)	Pepsi Center; 12,107	19–5
25	December 18	New Orleans	L 90–99	James Harden (21)	Dwight Howard (13)	James Harden (5)	Toyota Center; 18,137	19–6
26	December 20	Atlanta	L 97–104	Dwight Howard (19)	Dwight Howard (11)	James Harden (14)	Toyota Center; 16,998	19–7
27	December 22	Portland	W 110–95	James Harden (44)	Dwight Howard (13)	James Harden (7)	Toyota Center; 18,316	20–7
28	December 26	@ Memphis	W 117–111 (OT)	James Harden (32)	Dwight Howard (11)	James Harden (10)	FedExForum; 18,119	21–7
29	December 28	@ San Antonio	L 106–110	James Harden (28)	Dwight Howard (17)	James Harden (5)	AT&T Center; 18,581	21–8
30	December 29	Washington	L 103–104	James Harden (33)	Dorsey, Harden, Motiejūnas (6)	Beverley, Harden, Terry (4)	Toyota Center; 18,322	21–9
31	December 31	Charlotte	W 102–83	James Harden (36)	Dwight Howard (8)	James Harden (6)	Toyota Center; 18,276	22–9

January: 11–6 (home: 5–1; road: 6–5)

Game	Date	Team	Score	High points	High rebounds	High assists	Location Attendance	Record
32	January 2	@ New Orleans	L 83–111	Brewer, Howard (12)	Joey Dorsey (10)	Kostas Papanikolaou (4)	Smoothie King Center; 17,705	22–10
33	January 3	Miami	W 115–79	James Harden (28)	Dwight Howard (13)	Trevor Ariza (4)	Toyota Center; 18,338	23–10
34	January 5	@ Chicago	L 105–114	Josh Smith (21)	Dwight Howard (14)	Patrick Beverley (6)	United Center; 21,510	23–11
35	January 7	@ Cleveland	W 105–93	James Harden (21)	Dwight Howard (19)	James Harden (9)	Quicken Loans Arena; 20,562	24–11
36	January 8	@ New York	W 120–96	James Harden (25)	Dwight Howard (10)	James Harden (9)	Madison Square Garden; 19,812	25–11
37	January 10	Utah	W 97–82	James Harden (30)	Donatas Motiejūnas (10)	Patrick Beverley (7)	Toyota Center; 18,235	26–11
38	January 12	@ Brooklyn	W 113–99	James Harden (30)	Donatas Motiejūnas (11)	James Harden (6)	Barclays Center; 16,115	27–11
39	January 14	@ Orlando	L 113–120	James Harden (26)	Josh Smith (10)	James Harden (10)	Amway Center; 16,828	27–12
40	January 15	Oklahoma City	W 112–101	James Harden (31)	James Harden (9)	James Harden (10)	Toyota Center; 18,315	28–12
41	January 17	Golden State	L 106–131	Dwight Howard (23)	Dwight Howard (10)	Ariza, Beverley, Harden (4)	Toyota Center; 18,458	28–13
42	January 19	Indiana	W 110–98	James Harden (45)	Dwight Howard (17)	James Harden (7)	Toyota Center; 18,266	29–13
43	January 21	@ Golden State	L 113–126	James Harden (33)	Joey Dorsey (12)	James Harden (6)	Oracle Arena; 19,596	29–14
44	January 23	@ Phoenix	W 113–111	James Harden (33)	Ariza, Dorsey, Harden, Motiejūnas (6)	James Harden (10)	US Airways Center; 16,701	30–14
45	January 25	@ L.A. Lakers	W 99–87	James Harden (37)	Donatas Motiejūnas (9)	Ariza, Harden (5)	Staples Center; 18,997	31–14
46	January 28	Dallas	W 99–94	Josh Smith (18)	Josh Smith (6)	James Harden (8)	Toyota Center; 18,237	32–14
47	January 30	@ Boston	W 93–87	Donatas Motiejūnas (26)	Donatas Motiejūnas (12)	James Harden (7)	TD Garden; 17,675	33–14
48	January 31	@ Detroit	L 101–114	James Harden (26)	Harden, Smith (7)	James Harden (9)	Palace of Auburn Hills; 18,213	33–15

February: 7–3 (home: 6–1; road: 1–2)

Game	Date	Team	Score	High points	High rebounds	High assists	Location Attendance	Record
49	February 4	Chicago	W 101–90	James Harden (27)	Josh Smith (13)	Harden, Smith (4)	Toyota Center; 18,325	34–15
50	February 6	Milwaukee	W 117–111	James Harden (33)	Josh Smith (10)	Josh Smith (8)	Toyota Center; 18,239	35–15
51	February 8	Portland	L 98–109	James Harden (45)	James Harden (9)	James Harden (8)	Toyota Center; 18,243	35–16
52	February 10	@ Phoenix	W 127–118	James Harden (40)	James Harden (12)	James Harden (9)	US Airways Center; 17,071	36–16
53	February 11	@ L.A. Clippers	L 95–110	Josh Smith (21)	Josh Smith (13)	Beverley, Harden (6)	Staples Center; 19,060	36–17
All-Star Break
54	February 20	@ Dallas	L 100–111	James Harden (26)	Terrence Jones (9)	James Harden (5)	American Airlines Center; 20,389	36–18
55	February 21	Toronto	W 98–76	Corey Brewer (26)	Donatas Motiejūnas (11)	James Harden (7)	Toyota Center; 18,329	37–18
56	February 23	Minnesota	W 113–102	James Harden (31)	Terrence Jones (15)	James Harden (10)	Toyota Center; 18,240	38–18
57	February 25	L.A. Clippers	W 110–105	James Harden (21)	Motiejūnas, Smith (9)	James Harden (10)	Toyota Center; 18,154	39–18
58	February 27	Brooklyn	W 102–98	Terrence Jones (26)	Terrence Jones (12)	James Harden (12)	Toyota Center; 18,139	40–18

March: 10–6 (home: 5–2; road: 5–4)

Game	Date	Team	Score	High points	High rebounds	High assists	Location Attendance	Record
59	March 1	Cleveland	W 105–103 (OT)	James Harden (33)	James Harden (8)	Beverley, Harden (5)	Toyota Center; 18,345	41–18
60	March 3	@ Atlanta	L 96–104	Jason Terry (21)	Jones, Motiejūnas (8)	Beverley, Motiejūnas (7)	Philips Arena; 18,968	41–19
61	March 4	Memphis	L 100–102	Terrence Jones (21)	Terrence Jones (9)	James Harden (13)	Toyota Center; 18,224	41–20
62	March 6	Detroit	W 103–93	James Harden (38)	James Harden (12)	James Harden (12)	Toyota Center; 18,193	42–20
63	March 7	@ Denver	W 114–100	James Harden (28)	Terrence Jones (11)	James Harden (7)	Pepsi Center; 15,231	43–20
64	March 11	@ Portland	L 100–105	Corey Brewer (23)	Terrence Jones (12)	Ariza, Harden (6)	Moda Center; 19,279	43–21
65	March 12	@ Utah	L 91–109	Corey Brewer (25)	Terrence Jones (10)	James Harden (7)	EnergySolutions Arena; 18,781	43–22
66	March 15	@ L.A. Clippers	W 100–98	James Harden (34)	Terrence Jones (12)	James Harden (7)	Staples Center; 19,211	44–22
67	March 17	Orlando	W 107–94	Donatas Motiejūnas (23)	Corey Brewer (12)	Patrick Beverley (7)	Toyota Center; 18,235	45–22
68	March 19	Denver	W 118–108	James Harden (50)	James Harden (10)	Patrick Beverley (7)	Toyota Center; 18,456	46–22
69	March 21	Phoenix	L 102–117	Donatas Motiejūnas (18)	Trevor Ariza (12)	Donatas Motiejūnas (6)	Toyota Center; 18,340	46–23
70	March 23	@ Indiana	W 110–100	James Harden (44)	Trevor Ariza (11)	James Harden (7)	Bankers Life Fieldhouse; 16,201	47–23
71	March 25	@ New Orleans	W 95–93	James Harden (25)	Trevor Ariza (9)	James Harden (10)	Smoothie King Center; 17,077	48–23
72	March 27	Minnesota	W 120–110	James Harden (33)	Corey Brewer (10)	Josh Smith (11)	Toyota Center; 18,322	49–23
73	March 29	@ Washington	W 99–91	James Harden (24)	Howard, Smith (10)	James Harden (6)	Verizon Center; 20,356	50–23
74	March 30	@ Toronto	L 96–99	James Harden (31)	Trevor Ariza (8)	Pablo Prigioni (7)	Air Canada Centre; 19,800	50–24

April : 6–2 (home: 3–1; road: 3–1)

Game	Date	Team	Score	High points	High rebounds	High assists	Location Attendance	Record
75	April 1	Sacramento	W 115–111	James Harden (51)	Joey Dorsey (11)	Pablo Prigioni (7)	Toyota Center; 18,312	51–24
76	April 2	@ Dallas	W 108–101	James Harden (24)	Josh Smith (12)	Ariza, Harden (6)	American Airlines Center; 20,062	52–24
77	April 5	@ Oklahoma City	W 115–112	James Harden (41)	Trevor Ariza (9)	James Harden (6)	Chesapeake Energy Arena; 18,203	53–24
78	April 8	@ San Antonio	L 98–110	James Harden (22)	Dwight Howard (11)	Prigioni, Smith (5)	AT&T Center; 18,581	53–25
79	April 10	San Antonio	L 103–104	Josh Smith (20)	Dwight Howard (14)	James Harden (10)	Toyota Center; 18,457	53–26
80	April 12	New Orleans	W 121–114	James Harden (30)	Dwight Howard (11)	James Harden (7)	Toyota Center; 18,318	54–26
81	April 13	@ Charlotte	W 100–90	James Harden (29)	Jones, Smith (11)	Harden, Prigioni (6)	Time Warner Cable Arena; 15,797	55–26
82	April 15	Utah	W 117–91	James Harden (16)	James Harden (11)	James Harden (10)	Toyota Center; 18,320	56–26

2014–15 season schedule

=== Playoffs ===
2015 playoff game log
Total: 9–8 (home: 7–2; road: 2–6)
First Round: 4–1 (home: 3–0; road: 1–1)

Game	Date	Team	Score	High points	High rebounds	High assists	Location Attendance	Series
1	April 18	Dallas	W 118–108	James Harden (24)	Trevor Ariza (11)	James Harden (11)	Toyota Center; 18,231	1–0
2	April 21	Dallas	W 111–99	Dwight Howard (28)	Dwight Howard (12)	Josh Smith (9)	Toyota Center; 18,243	2–0
3	April 24	@ Dallas	W 130–128	James Harden (42)	Dwight Howard (26)	James Harden (9)	American Airlines Center; 20,651	3–0
4	April 26	@ Dallas	L 109–121	James Harden (24)	Dwight Howard (7)	Harden, Prigioni (5)	American Airlines Center; 20,589	3–1
5	April 28	Dallas	W 103–94	James Harden (28)	Dwight Howard (19)	James Harden (8)	Toyota Center; 18,231	4–1

Conference Semifinals: 4–3 (home: 3–1; road: 1–2)

Game	Date	Team	Score	High points	High rebounds	High assists	Location Attendance	Series
1	May 4	L. A. Clippers	L 101–117	Dwight Howard (22)	Dwight Howard (10)	James Harden (12)	Toyota Center; 18,231	0–1
2	May 6	L. A. Clippers	W 115–109	James Harden (32)	Dwight Howard (16)	James Harden (7)	Toyota Center; 18,310	1–1
3	May 8	@ L. A. Clippers	L 99–124	James Harden (25)	Dwight Howard (14)	James Harden (11)	Staples Center; 19,367	1–2
4	May 10	@ L. A. Clippers	L 95–128	James Harden (21)	Ariza, Howard (8)	James Harden (8)	Staples Center; 19,490	1–3
5	May 12	L. A. Clippers	W 124–103	James Harden (26)	Dwight Howard (15)	James Harden (10)	Toyota Center; 18,142	2–3
6	May 14	@ L. A. Clippers	W 119–107	James Harden (23)	Dwight Howard (21)	Jason Terry (5)	Staples Center; 19,417	3–3
7	May 17	L. A. Clippers	W 113–100	James Harden (31)	Dwight Howard (15)	James Harden (8)	Toyota Center; 18,463	4–3

Conference Finals: 1–4 (home: 1–1; road: 0–3)

Game	Date	Team	Score	High points	High rebounds	High assists	Location Attendance	Series
1	May 19	@ Golden State	L 106–110	James Harden (28)	Dwight Howard (13)	James Harden (9)	Oracle Arena; 19,596	0–1
2	May 21	@ Golden State	L 98–99	James Harden (38)	Dwight Howard (17)	James Harden (9)	Oracle Arena; 19,596	0–2
3	May 23	Golden State	L 80–115	James Harden (17)	Dwight Howard (14)	Harden, Smith (4)	Toyota Center; 18,282	0–3
4	May 25	Golden State	W 128–115	James Harden (45)	Dwight Howard (12)	Harden, Smith (5)	Toyota Center; 18,239	1–3
5	May 27	@ Golden State	L 90–104	Dwight Howard (18)	Dwight Howard (16)	James Harden (5)	Oracle Arena; 19,596	1–4

2015 playoff schedule

== Roster ==
2014–15 Houston Rockets roster
Players

Pos.	No.	Player	Height	Weight	DOB	From
G/F	1	Trevor Ariza	6 ft 8 in (2.03 m)	215 lb (98 kg)	1985–06–30	UCLA
G	2	Patrick Beverley	6 ft 1 in (1.85 m)	210 lb (95 kg)	1988–07–12	Arkansas
G/F	33	Corey Brewer	6 ft 9 in (2.06 m)	186 lb (84 kg)	1986–03–05	Florida
F/C	15	Clint Capela	6 ft 10 in (2.08 m)	240 lb (109 kg)	1994–05–18	INSEP (FRA)
F/C	8	Joey Dorsey	6 ft 9 in (2.06 m)	275 lb (125 kg)	1983–12–16	Memphis
G	13	James Harden	6 ft 5 in (1.96 m)	225 lb (102 kg)	1989–08–26	Arizona State
C	12	Dwight Howard	6 ft 11 in (2.11 m)	275 lb (125 kg)	1985–12–08	SW Atlanta Academy (GA)
F	6	Terrence Jones	6 ft 9 in (2.06 m)	252 lb (114 kg)	1992–01–09	Kentucky
G/F	32	K. J. McDaniels	6 ft 6 in (1.98 m)	200 lb (91 kg)	1993–02–09	Clemson
F/C	20	Donatas Motiejūnas	7 ft 0 in (2.13 m)	255 lb (116 kg)	1990–09–20	Lithuania
F	16	Kostas Papanikolaou	6 ft 8 in (2.03 m)	235 lb (107 kg)	1990–07–31	Greece
G	9	Pablo Prigioni	6 ft 3 in (1.91 m)	185 lb (84 kg)	1977–05–17	Argentina
F	5	Josh Smith	6 ft 9 in (2.06 m)	225 lb (102 kg)	1985–12–05	Oak Hill Academy (VA)
G	31	Jason Terry	6 ft 2 in (1.88 m)	185 lb (84 kg)	1977–09–15	Arizona

Coaches
Head coach
- Kevin McHale
Assistant(s)
- J. B. Bickerstaff
- Greg Buckner
- T. R. Dunn
- Chris Finch

Legend
- (DP) Unsigned draft pick
- (FA) Free agent
- (S) Suspended
- (DL) On assignment to D-League affiliate
- Injured

Roster
Updated: 2015–03–27

=== Salaries ===
Player	2014–15 Salary
Dwight Howard	$21,436,271
James Harden	$14,728,844
Trevor Ariza	$8,579,089
Jason Terry	$5,850,313
Kostas Papanikolaou	$4,797,664
Corey Brewer	$4,702,500
Josh Smith	$2,077,000
Pablo Prigioni	$1,662,961
Terrence Jones	$1,618,680
Donatas Motiejūnas	$1,483,920
Clint Capela	$1,189,200
Joey Dorsey	$948,163
Patrick Beverley	$915,243
K. J. McDaniels	$507,336
TOTAL	$71,004,520

== Player statistics ==
Legend
GP	Games played	GS	Games started	MPG	Minutes per game
FG%	Field-goal percentage	3P%	3-point field-goal percentage	FT%	Free-throw percentage
RPG	Rebounds per game	APG	Assists per game	SPG	Steals per game
BPG	Blocks per game	PPG	Points per game

=== Regular season ===
Houston Rockets statistics
Player	GP	GS	MPG	FG%	3P%	FT%	RPG	APG	SPG	BPG	PPG
Trevor Ariza	82	82	35.7	.402	.350	.850	5.6	2.5	1.9	0.2	12.8
Patrick Beverley	56	55	30.8	.383	.356	.750	4.2	3.4	1.1	0.4	10.1
Tarik Black‡‡	25	12	15.7	.542	.000	.520	5.1	0.3	0.2	0.1	4.2
Corey Brewer	56	1	25.1	.429	.284	.760	3.6	1.7	1.1	0.3	11.9
Isaiah Canaan‡	25	9	14.8	.405	.381	.760	2.7	2.0	0.7	0.0	6.2
Clint Capela	12	0	7.5	.483	.000	.170	3.0	0.2	0.1	0.8	2.7
Troy Daniels‡	17	0	6.4	.319	.302	.750	0.4	0.2	0.0	0.0	2.7
Joey Dorsey	69	17	12.4	.552	.000	.290	4.0	0.4	0.6	0.4	2.7
Francisco García‡‡	14	0	14.3	.270	.222	.250	1.2	1.1	0.6	0.4	3.2
James Harden	81	81	36.8	.440	.375	.870	5.7	7.0	1.9	0.7	27.4
Dwight Howard	41	41	29.8	.593	.500	.530	10.5	1.2	0.7	1.3	15.8
Nick Johnson	28	0	9.4	.347	.238	.680	1.4	0.4	0.3	0.1	2.6
Terrence Jones	33	24	26.9	.528	.351	.610	6.7	1.1	0.6	1.8	11.7
K. J. McDaniels	10	0	3.3	.333	.000	.500	0.5	0.2	0.0	0.2	1.1
Donatas Motiejūnas	71	62	28.7	.504	.368	.600	5.9	1.8	0.8	0.5	12.0
Kostas Papanikolaou	43	1	18.5	.350	.292	.720	2.7	2.0	0.7	0.3	4.2
Pablo Prigioni	24	0	16.8	.343	.275	.870	1.6	2.8	1.1	0.0	3.0
Alexey Shved‡	9	0	6.6	.333	.333	.820	0.4	0.3	0.1	0.0	3.2
Josh Smith	55	7	25.5	.438	.330	.520	6.0	2.6	0.9	1.2	12.0
Jason Terry	77	18	21.3	.422	.390	.810	1.6	1.9	0.9	0.3	7.0

^{‡}Traded mid-season ^{‡‡}Waived during season

=== Playoffs ===
Houston Rockets statistics
Player	GP	GS	MPG	FG%	3P%	FT%	RPG	APG	SPG	BPG	PPG
Trevor Ariza	17	17	38.5	.426	.375	.905	6.4	2.6	1.8	.1	13.2
James Harden	17	17	37.4	.439	.383	.916	5.7	7.5	1.6	.4	27.2
Dwight Howard	17	17	33.8	.577		.412	14.0	1.2	1.4	2.3	16.4
Jason Terry	17	17	28.6	.425	.354	.813	2.2	2.8	.9	.1	9.2
Terrence Jones	17	9	23.6	.421	.158	.667	4.8	1.0	.5	.7	10.2
Josh Smith	17	8	23.3	.438	.380	.432	5.6	2.7	.5	1.0	13.5
Corey Brewer	17	0	25.2	.431	.286	.636	2.8	1.1	.6	.2	11.2
Pablo Prigioni	17	0	17.2	.333	.293	.750	1.1	2.3	.9	.0	3.1
Clint Capela	17	0	7.5	.677		.517	2.5	.3	.2	.5	3.4
Nick Johnson	9	0	5.4	.235	.143	1.000	.4	.4	.0	.1	1.3
Kostas Papanikolaou	8	0	2.6	.250	.000	.500	.3	.0	.0	.0	.4
Joey Dorsey	6	0	2.2	.000		.500	.7	.3	.0	.0	.2

== Injuries ==
Player	Duration		Injury type	Games missed
Player	Start	End	Injury type	Games missed
Patrick Beverley	November 1, 2014	November 4, 2014	Hamstring	2
Terrence Jones	November 3, 2014	January 28, 2015	Left leg nerve inflammation	41
Patrick Beverley	November 6, 2014	November 16, 2014	Hamstring	4
Dwight Howard	November 19, 2014	December 13, 2014	Strained knee	11
Patrick Beverley	November 24, 2014	December 6, 2014	Hamstring	6
Isaiah Canaan	November 28, 2014	December 17, 2014	Sprained ankle	7
Kostas Papanikolaou	December 5, 2014	December 18, 2014	Sprained knee	5
Dwight Howard	January 23, 2015	March 25, 2015	Swelling in right knee	26
Kostas Papanikolaou	February 23, 2015	April 8, 2015	Sprained ankle	22
Terrence Jones	March 19, 2015	April 1, 2015	Partially collapsed lung	6
Patrick Beverley	March 23, 2015	Missed rest of season	Torn ligaments in left wrist	12
Donatas Motiejūnas	March 27, 2015	Missed rest of season	Back surgery	11

== Transactions ==
The Rockets had a busy offseason, trading away key contributors Jeremy Lin and Ömer Aşık in July to clear cap space. Houston was after marquee free agents such as LeBron James, Chris Bosh, and Carmelo Anthony, but struck out on all three of those players. The Rockets also let Chandler Parsons, another key contributor from the previous season, sign with the Dallas Mavericks in July, declining to match the hefty offer sheet Parsons received from Dallas. The Rockets would eventually make up for these losses throughout the summer and regular season. As part of the Aşık deal, the Rockets received Trevor Ariza from the Washington Wizards in a sign and trade. Ariza replaced Parsons as the team's starting small forward. In September, the team traded for Jason Terry, a former sixth man of the year with the Mavericks. Terry provided veteran leadership and a spark off the bench for the Rockets. In December, the Rockets acquired Corey Brewer and Josh Smith, who both added significant depth to the roster. At the trade deadline in February, the Rockets acquired Pablo Prigioni and K. J. McDaniels in two separate deals.

=== Trades ===
July 13, 2014	To Houston Rockets Rights to Sergei Lishouk	To Los Angeles Lakers Jeremy Lin; Future first-round draft pick Second round draft pick (2015)
July 15, 2014	Three-team trade
July 15, 2014	To Houston Rockets Trevor Ariza (Sign and trade from Washington) Alonzo Gee (from New Orleans) Scotty Hopson (from New Orleans) Protected first round draft pick (2015, from New Orleans)	To New Orleans Pelicans Ömer Aşık (from Houston) Omri Casspi (from Houston) Cash considerations (from Houston)
July 15, 2014	To Washington Wizards Melvin Ely (from New Orleans)
September 17, 2014	To Houston Rockets Jason Terry; Second round draft pick (2015); Second round draft pick (2016)	To Sacramento Kings Alonzo Gee; Scotty Hopson
December 19, 2014	Three-team trade
December 19, 2014	To Houston Rockets Corey Brewer (from Minnesota) Alexey Shved (from Philadelphia)	To Minnesota Timberwolves Troy Daniels (from Houston) Second round draft pick (2015, from Houston, belonging to Sacramento Kings) Second round draft pick (2016, from Houston) Cash considerations (from Houston)
December 19, 2014	To Philadelphia 76ers Ronny Turiaf (from Minnesota) Rights to Sergei Lishouk (from Houston) Second round draft pick (2015, from Houston)
February 19, 2015	To Houston Rockets Pablo Prigioni	To New York Knicks Alexey Shved; Second round draft pick (2017); Second round draft pick (2019)
February 19, 2015	To Houston Rockets K. J. McDaniels	To Philadelphia 76ers Isaiah Canaan; Second round draft pick (2015)

=== Free agents ===
==== Re-signed ====
Player	Signed	Contract	Ref.
Troy Daniels	July 14, 2014	2 years, $2 million	
Francisco García	August 22, 2014	1 year, $1.3 million	
Kevin McHale (Note: Was in the final year of his contract as head coach. Midway through the season he signed a contract extension to remain head coach for the next three years.)	December 24, 2014	3 years, $13 million	

==== Additions ====
Player	Signed	Former team	Ref.
Joey Dorsey	July 18, 2014	(Spain) FC Barcelona Basquet	
Tarik Black	August 27, 2014	Kansas Jayhawks men's basketball	
Kostas Papanikolaou	September 23, 2014	(Spain) FC Barcelona Basquet	
Josh Smith	December 26, 2014	Detroit Pistons	

==== Subtractions ====
Player	Reason left	Date	New team	Ref.
Chandler Parsons (Note: Was a restricted free agent entering the offseason. Signed an offer sheet with Dallas on July 10, 2014. A few days later, the Rockets elected not to match the offer, clearing the way for Parsons to officially sign with the Mavericks.)	Free agency	July 15, 2014	Dallas Mavericks	
Josh Powell	Waived	October 24, 2014	None	
Robert Covington	Waived	October 27, 2014	Philadelphia 76ers	
Francisco García	Waived	December 19, 2014	None	
Tarik Black	Waived	December 26, 2014	Los Angeles Lakers	

== Awards, records and milestones ==
Player	Award	Date awarded	Ref.
James Harden	Western Conference Player of the Week	December 15, 2014	
James Harden	Western Conference Player of the Week	December 29, 2014	
James Harden	Western Conference Player of the Month (December)	January 5, 2015	
James Harden	Western Conference Player of the Month (January)	February 4, 2015	
James Harden	Western Conference Player of the Week	April 6, 2015	
James Harden	All-NBA First Team	May 21, 2015	

=== Records ===
- Clint Capela missed the first 15 free throw attempts of his career, setting an NBA record.

=== Milestones ===
- On December 13, Dwight Howard reached 10,000 career rebounds. At 29 years, 5 days, Howard became the third youngest player in NBA history to reach 10,000 career rebounds. Only Wilt Chamberlain (28 years, 81 days) and Bill Russell (28 years, 285 days) reached the milestone at a younger age.
