= Pablo Prigioni =

Argentine-Italian basketball player and coach

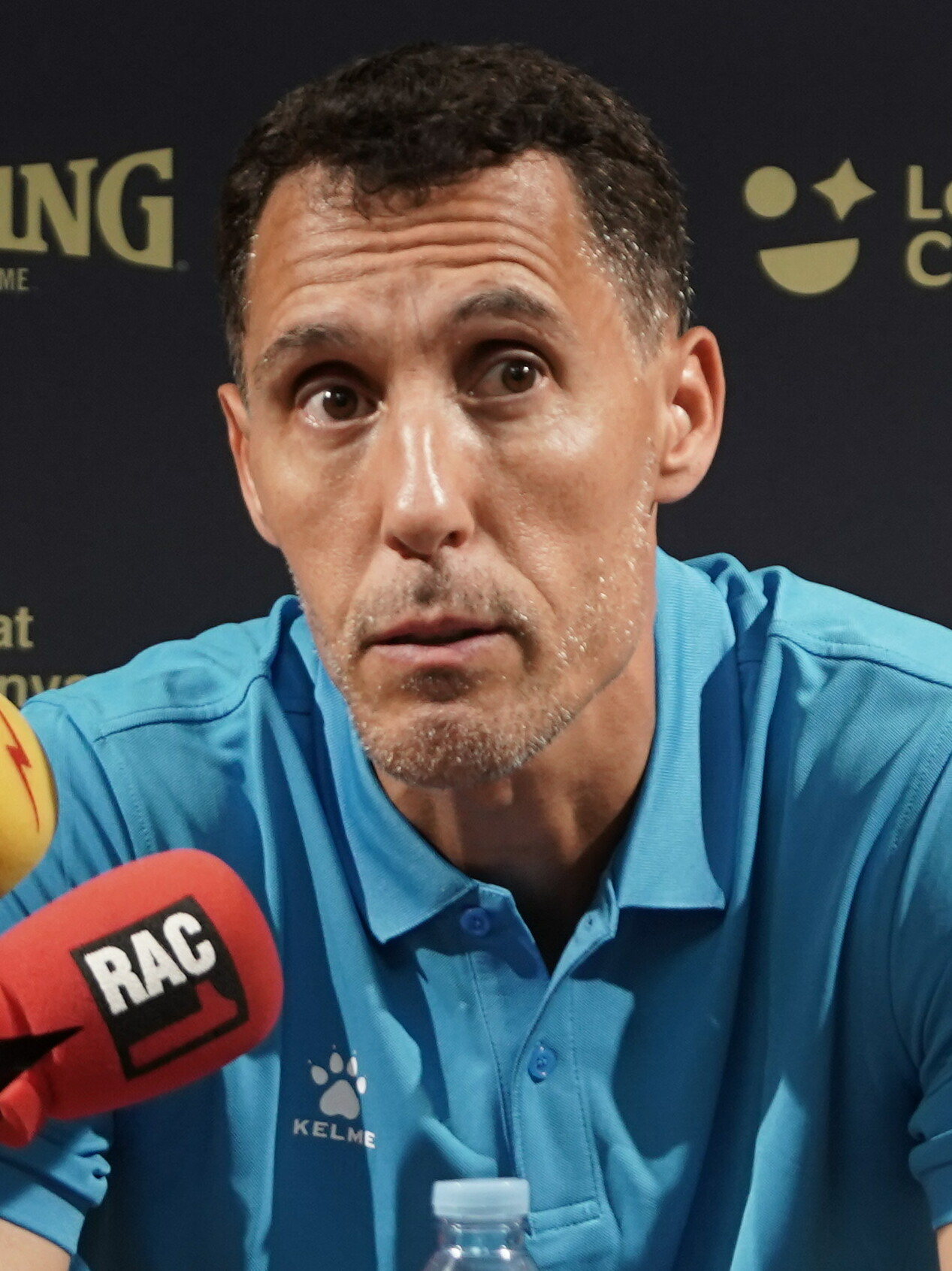
- Prigioni in 2023

Minnesota Timberwolves
- Title: Assistant coach
- League: NBA

Personal information
- Born: 17 May 1977 (age 49) Río Tercero, Argentina
- Listed height: 6 ft 4 in (1.93 m)
- Listed weight: 185 lb (84 kg)

Career information
- NBA draft: 1999: undrafted
- Playing career: 1995–2017
- Position: Point guard
- Number: 5, 9, 10
- Coaching career: 2017–present

Career history

Playing
- 1995–1996: Ramallo
- 1996–1998: Belgrano San Nicolás
- 1998–1999: Obras Sanitarias
- 1999–2001: Fuenlabrada
- 2001–2003: Lucentum Alicante
- 2003–2009: Baskonia
- 2009–2011: Real Madrid
- 2011–2012: Baskonia
- 2012–2015: New York Knicks
- 2015: Houston Rockets
- 2015–2016: Los Angeles Clippers
- 2016–2017: Baskonia

Coaching
- 2017: Baskonia
- 2018–2019: Brooklyn Nets (assistant)
- 2019–present: Minnesota Timberwolves (assistant)
- 2022–: Argentina

Career highlights
- As a player: 2× All-EuroLeague Second Team (2006, 2007); EuroLeague assists leader (2006); Spanish League champion (2008); 3× Spanish Cup winner (2004, 2006, 2009); 4× Spanish Supercup winner (2005–2008); 3× All-Spanish League Team (2006, 2007, 2009); Spanish Cup MVP (2006); Spanish Supercup MVP (2008); Spanish 2nd Division Cup winner (2002); No. 5 retired by Baskonia
- Stats at NBA.com
- Stats at Basketball Reference
Medals
Men's basketball
Representing Argentina
Summer Olympic Games
Bronze medal – third place	2008 Beijing
FIBA AmeriCup
Silver medal – second place	2003 Puerto Rico
Silver medal – second place	2007 Las Vegas
Bronze medal – third place	2009 San Juan
Gold medal – first place	2011 Mar del Plata
FIBA Diamond Ball
Gold medal – first place	2008 Nanjing
FIBA South American Championship
Silver medal – second place	2003 Montevideo
Gold medal – first place	2004 Brazil
Head coach for Argentina
FIBA AmeriCup
Gold medal – first place	2022 Brazil

Pablo Prigioni (born 17 May 1977) is an Argentine-Italian professional basketball coach and former player who is an assistant coach for the Minnesota Timberwolves of the National Basketball Association (NBA). He played the point guard position, and was a member of the senior Argentina national basketball team that won the bronze medal at the 2008 Summer Olympics. Prigioni is the oldest rookie in NBA history, making his debut with the New York Knicks in 2012 at 35. Prior to this, he was a two-time All-EuroLeague selection playing in Europe, most notably Spain. He played four seasons in the NBA with the Knicks, Houston Rockets, and Los Angeles Clippers before starting coaching in 2017.

== Professional career ==
=== Ramallo (1995–1996) ===
Prigioni began his professional career with Ramallo of the Argentine LNB League during the 1995–96 season.

=== Belgrano San Nicolás (1996–1998) ===
Prigioni moved to Belgrano San Nicolás in 1996, playing with them until 1998.

=== Obras Sanitarias (1998–1999) ===
Prigioni transferred to Obras Sanitarias in 1998 and played with the club until 1999.

=== Fuenlabrada (1999–2001) ===
In 1999, Prigioni moved to the Spanish club Fuenlabrada, where he stayed until 2001.

=== Lucentum Alicante (2001–2003) ===
In 2001, Prigioni joined the Spanish club Lucentum Alicante, and he played there until 2003.

=== Baskonia (2003–2009) ===
In 2003, Prigioni joined the EuroLeague team Baskonia. With Baskonia he won several titles, including: 3 Spanish King's Cups in the years 2004, 2006, 2009; 4 Spanish Supercups in the years 2005, 2006, 2007, 2008; and the Spanish League championship in 2008.

=== Real Madrid (2009–2011) ===
In 2009, Prigioni joined Real Madrid.

=== Return to Baskonia (2011–2012) ===
In August 2011, Prigioni returned to Baskonia, signing a one-year deal.

=== New York Knicks (2012–2015) ===
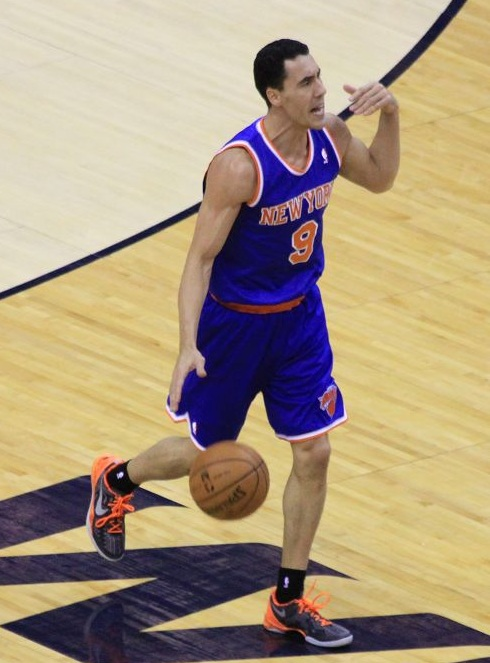
Prigioni with the New York Knicks in 2013

On July 24, 2012, Prigioni signed a one-year contract with the New York Knicks for the rookie minimum. At age 35, Prigioni became the oldest rookie in NBA history, when he made his debut on November 2, 2012. He became the team's starting point guard for the last two months of the 2012–13 season, as well as for the playoffs. In game 6 of the Knicks' first-round playoff series against the Boston Celtics, Prigioni made 3 three-pointers in the first quarter. The Knicks won 88–80, to advance to the second round of the playoffs for the first time in 13 years.

On July 10, 2013, Prigioni re-signed with the Knicks.

=== Houston Rockets (2015) ===
On February 19, 2015, Prigioni was traded to the Houston Rockets, in exchange for Alexey Shved, and two second-round draft picks.

=== Los Angeles Clippers (2015–2016) ===
On July 20, 2015, the Rockets traded Prigioni, Joey Dorsey, Nick Johnson, Kostas Papanikolaou, a 2016 first-round draft pick, and cash considerations, to the Denver Nuggets, in exchange for Ty Lawson and a 2017 second-round draft pick. Prigioni was immediately waived by Denver, upon being acquired.

On August 3, 2015, Prigioni signed with the Los Angeles Clippers. On January 13, 2016, he had a career-high eight steals against the Miami Heat, which was one shy of the franchise record, held by his head coach, Doc Rivers. On April 8, 2016, he recorded a season-high 13 points, a career-high seven rebounds, and a season-high seven assists, in a 102–99 overtime win over the Utah Jazz.

On July 29, 2016, Prigioni signed with the Houston Rockets, returning to the franchise for a second stint. However, he was waived by the Rockets on October 24, 2016, after appearing in five preseason games with them.

=== Third stint with Baskonia (2016–2017) ===
On December 5, 2016, Prigioni returned to Baskonia, signing with them for the rest of the season. He officially retired from his professional basketball playing career on January 9, 2017. During his professional career, Prigioni played in 10 EuroLeague seasons, in which he had career averages of 6.1 points, 4.3 assists, 2.5 rebounds, and 1.7 steals per game, and in four NBA seasons, in which he had career regular season averages of 3.5 points, 2.8 assists, 1.9 rebounds, and 1.0 steals per game.

On January 15, 2017, following his retirement, Baskonia retired his jersey number 5.

== Coaching career ==
=== Baskonia (2017) ===
On 16 June 2017, Prigioni began his coaching career, when he signed a two-year deal with Baskonia, to become their new head coach. However, on October 26, Prigioni stepped down as Baskonia head coach, after having a 0–3 start in the EuroLeague and a 2–3 start in the Liga ACB.

=== Brooklyn Nets (2018–2019) ===
On 24 April 2018, Prigioni joined the Brooklyn Nets as an assistant coach. During the 2018–19 NBA season, the Nets returned to the NBA playoffs for the first time since 2015.

=== Minnesota Timberwolves (2019–present) ===
On 25 June 2019, Prigioni was hired by the Minnesota Timberwolves as an assistant coach. He coached the Wolves in the 2019 Las Vegas Summer League and was put in charge of the team's offense for the following season.

=== Argentina (2022–present) ===
On 1 September 2022, Prigioni became the head coach of the Argentina men's national basketball team.

== National team career ==
As a member of the Argentine senior men's national basketball team, Prigioni played at the 2006 FIBA World Championship. He won silver medals at the 2003 FIBA Americas Championship and 2007 FIBA Americas Championship. Prigioni was also a member of the Argentina national team that competed at the 2008 Summer Olympics and won the bronze medal. He also won the bronze medal at the 2009 FIBA Americas Championship, and the gold medal at the 2011 FIBA Americas Championship.

== Career statistics ==
Legend
GP	Games played	GS	Games started	MPG	Minutes per game
FG%	Field-goal percentage	3P%	3-point field-goal percentage	FT%	Free-throw percentage
RPG	Rebounds per game	APG	Assists per game	SPG	Steals per game
BPG	Blocks per game	PPG	Points per game	PIR	Performance index rating
**Bold**	Career high

=== NBA ===
==== Regular season ====
Year	Team	GP	GS	MPG	FG%	3P%	FT%	RPG	APG	SPG	BPG	PPG
2012–13	New York	**78**	18	16.2	.455	.396	.880	1.8	3.0	.9	.0	3.5
2013–14	New York	66	**27**	**19.4**	**.461**	**.464**	**.917**	**2.0**	**3.5**	1.0	.0	3.8
2014–15	New York	43	3	18.5	.422	.374	.846	1.9	2.4	**1.2**	.0	**4.7**
2014–15	Houston	24	0	17.7	.343	.275	.867	1.6	2.8	1.1	.0	3.0
2015–16	L.A. Clippers	59	3	13.9	.374	.295	.875	1.9	2.2	.9	.0	3.6
Career		270	51	16.9	.425	.379	.872	1.9	2.8	1.0	.0	3.5

==== Playoffs ====
Year	Team	GP	GS	MPG	FG%	3P%	FT%	RPG	APG	SPG	BPG	PPG
2013	New York	11	**10**	**20.9**	**.395**	**.433**	.500	**1.5**	**3.2**	**1.3**	**.1**	**4.5**
2015	Houston	**17**	0	17.2	.333	.293	**.750**	1.1	2.3	.9	.0	3.1
2016	L.A. Clippers	5	0	5.2	.0	.0	.0	0.6	1.4	.0	.0	.0
Career		33	10	16.6	.343	.342	.625	1.2	2.5	.9	.0	3.1

=== EuroLeague ===
*	Led the league

Year	Team	GP	GS	MPG	FG%	3P%	FT%	RPG	APG	SPG	BPG	PPG	PIR
2003–04	Baskonia	20	10	22.7	.452	.409	.810	2.1	4.0	1.9	**.2**	6.0	8.9
2004–05	Baskonia	21	7	19.5	.394	.313	.893	2.0	3.0	1.1	.0	4.4	6.6
2005–06	Baskonia	**25**	**22**	27.1	**.462**	.368	.837	2.1	**6.2**	2.2	—	5.8	11.7
2006–07	Baskonia	23	13	25.3	.442	.352	**.913**	2.8	4.7	**2.5**	.0	6.6	11.6
2007–08	Baskonia	**25***	2	23.7	.375	.327	.902	2.7	4.1	1.5	.0	7.0	9.0
2008–09	Baskonia	21	19	26.6	.433	**.427**	.545	2.5	4.3	1.5	—	6.4	9.5
2009–10	Real Madrid	20	19	27.6	.422	.328	.861	2.5	4.3	1.5	.1	7.0	10.1
2010–11	Real Madrid	18	13	25.5	.370	.344	.762	2.6	3.4	1.4	—	5.4	8.8
2011–12	Baskonia	10	6	**28.6**	.439	.308	.846	**3.2**	4.6	2.2	—	**7.3**	**12.8**
2016–17	Baskonia	3	0	8.7	.000	.000	.000	1.7	2.0	.7	—	0.0	1.7
Career		186	111	24.7	.419	.355	.831	2.5	4.3	1.7	.0	6.1	9.6

== Awards and accomplishments ==
=== Pro career ===
- Spanish Prince's Cup (Spanish 2nd Cup) Winner: (2002)
- Led the Spanish League in steals: (2003)
- 3× Spanish King's Cup Winner: (2004, 2006, 2009)
- 4× Spanish Supercup Winner: (2005, 2006, 2007, 2008)
- Spanish King's Cup MVP: (2006)
- 2× All-EuroLeague 2nd Team: (2006, 2007)
- Led the EuroLeague in assists: (2006)
- 3× All-ACB Team: (2006, 2007, 2009)
- Spanish League Champion: (2008)
- Spanish Supercup MVP: (2008)

=== Argentina national team ===
- 2003 FIBA Americas Championship: Gold
- 2003 South American Championship: Silver
- 2004 South American Championship: Gold
- 2007 FIBA Americas Championship: Silver
- 2008 FIBA Diamond Ball Tournament: Gold
- 2008 Summer Olympics: Bronze
- 2009 FIBA Americas Championship: Bronze
- 2011 FIBA Americas Chamship: Gold
