= 2015 NBA playoffs =

Postseason tournament

Tournament details
- Dates: April 18–June 16, 2015
- Season: 2014–15
- Teams: 16

Final positions
- Champions: Golden State Warriors (4th title)
- Runners-up: Cleveland Cavaliers
- Semifinalists: Atlanta Hawks; Houston Rockets

Tournament statistics
- Scoring leader(s): LeBron James (Cavaliers) (30.1 PPG)

Awards
- MVP: Andre Iguodala (Warriors)

The 2015 NBA playoffs was the postseason tournament of the National Basketball Association's 2014–15 season. The tournament concluded with the Western Conference champion Golden State Warriors defeating the Eastern Conference champion Cleveland Cavaliers 4 games to 2 in the NBA Finals. Andre Iguodala was named NBA Finals MVP.

The San Antonio Spurs were the defending champions, but lost in the first round to the Los Angeles Clippers.

== Overview ==
=== Western Conference ===
For the first time since 2005–06, all teams from a particular division made the playoffs (in this case, all five teams from the Southwest Division).

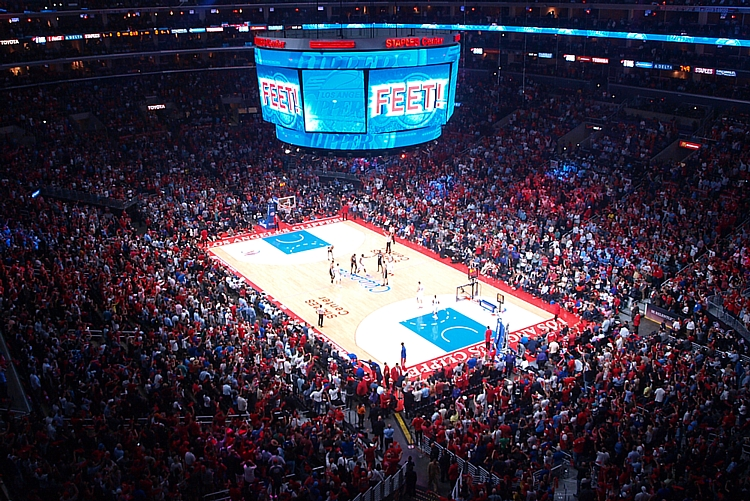
The Los Angeles Clippers hosting the San Antonio Spurs in Game 5 of the First Round series at the Staples Center.

The San Antonio Spurs made their 18th straight playoff appearance, while the Golden State Warriors (third straight playoff appearance) entered the playoffs as the first seed of their respective conferences.

Despite making the Western Conference Finals the previous year and winning 45 games this season, the Oklahoma City Thunder missed the playoffs due to a tie-breaker with the New Orleans Pelicans. The Pelicans themselves made their first playoff appearance since 2011, and their first as the Pelicans.

=== Eastern Conference ===
The Atlanta Hawks entered their eighth consecutive postseason (continuing the longest active streak in the Eastern Conference) with the top seed in the Eastern Conference.

The Cleveland Cavaliers made their first postseason appearance since 2010, the final season of LeBron James' first stint with the Cavaliers. On the other hand, James' former team, the Miami Heat, missed the playoffs after making the previous year's Finals, becoming the first team to do so since the 2005 Lakers. Miami had qualified for the playoffs for six consecutive seasons before missing this year, also reaching the NBA Finals four consecutive times. The Heat and their fellow Floridian team, the Orlando Magic, both missed the playoffs in the same season for the first time since 1993.

Despite making the Eastern Conference Finals last season, the Indiana Pacers failed to make the playoffs by virtue of losing a tie-breaker to the Brooklyn Nets.

Despite starting their respective seasons in a rebuilding mode, both the Milwaukee Bucks and the Boston Celtics returned to the playoffs after a one-year absence. Bucks head coach Jason Kidd became the first head coach to lead two teams to the playoffs in his first two seasons, having led the Nets to the playoffs the previous season.

=== First Round ===
The first round of the playoffs saw a record six teams take a 3–0 lead in their respective series, the first time it had happened since the first round expanded to a best-of-seven series in 2003.

The fifth seed defeated the fourth seed in both conferences for the third straight year.

With their first round victory over the Dallas Mavericks, the Houston Rockets won their first playoff series since 2009.

Game 7 between the Clippers and Spurs ensured a 16th straight postseason in which at least one Game 7 was played; 1999 was the last postseason to not feature a Game 7.

The San Antonio Spurs became the first defending champions to be eliminated in the first round since the 2011–12 Dallas Mavericks. This was only the second time it had happened since 2000.

=== Conference Semifinals ===
With the Spurs being eliminated in the first round, none of the eight teams remaining at the beginning of the Conference Semifinals had previously won an NBA championship in the 21st century. Entering the Conference Semifinals, of the teams who had previously won an NBA championship, the Chicago Bulls had the shortest drought at 17 years, having most recently won an NBA championship in 1998, while the Atlanta Hawks had the longest overall drought at 57 years, having won their only previous championship in 1958 when the franchise was based in St. Louis.

All teams that held a 2–1 series lead within the first three games of their respective second round series had gone on to lose that series.

The Cavaliers–Bulls series was notable for two game winning baskets by both teams’ star players.

- Game 3: Derrick Rose hitting a wide open three pointer to win the game for the Chicago Bulls.
- Game 4: LeBron James making a catch and shoot two pointer to win the game for the Cleveland Cavaliers.

With their Game 7 win over the Los Angeles Clippers, the Houston Rockets became the ninth team in NBA history to come back from a 3–1 series deficit to win the conference semifinals, and only the second franchise to do it twice. They had first achieved that goal 20 years ago against the Phoenix Suns. The Boston Celtics are the only other franchise to twice make this comeback, doing it in 1968 and 1981. Overall, twelve teams have achieved the feat, with the Golden State Warriors doing it in the Western Conference Finals and Cleveland Cavaliers doing it in the NBA Finals the following season. The Denver Nuggets did it twice in 2020.

With their series win over the Chicago Bulls, the Cleveland Cavaliers made the Eastern Conference Finals for the first time since 2009.

With their series win over the Washington Wizards, the Atlanta Hawks made the Conference Finals (then called the Division Finals) for the first time since 1970. Since 1970, they had lost all 15 Division or Conference Semifinal series they participated in.

With their series win over the Memphis Grizzlies, the Golden State Warriors made their first conference finals appearance since 1976, while the Houston Rockets made their first conference finals appearance since 1997. The Hawks, Warriors, and Rockets were the three NBA teams which had been waiting for the longest time for a return to the conference finals prior to this postseason.

=== Conference Finals ===
For the second straight year, the No. 1 seed faced the No. 2 seed in the Conference Finals, and for the fourth time since 2000.

For the first time in NBA playoff history, both conference finals teams, the Warriors of the West and the Cavaliers of the East, held commanding 3–0 series leads. Cleveland went on to the finals, sweeping the Atlanta Hawks 4–0 to make their first NBA Finals since 2007, while Golden State won their series 4–1 defeating the Houston Rockets en route to their first NBA Finals since 1975.

=== NBA Finals ===
For the first time since the inaugural Basketball Association of America season in 1946–47, two rookie coaches, David Blatt of the Cavaliers and Steve Kerr of the Warriors, met each other in the NBA finals.

Like the Conference Semifinals, the team that took a 2–1 series lead (the Cleveland Cavaliers), went on to lose the series.

The Golden State Warriors won their first championship since 1975. Andre Iguodala was named NBA Finals MVP despite not starting in a game until the NBA Finals.

== Format ==
Within each conference, the three division winners and the five non-division winners with the most wins qualified for the playoffs. The seedings are based on each team's record; however, a division winner is guaranteed to be ranked at least fourth, regardless of record.

Each conference's bracket is fixed; there is no reseeding. All rounds are best-of-seven series; the team that has four wins advances to the next round. As stated above, all rounds, including the NBA Finals, are in a 2–2–1–1–1 format. Home court advantage in any round does not necessarily belong to the higher-seeded team, but instead to the team with the better regular season record. If two teams with the same record meet in a round, standard tiebreaker rules are used. The rule for determining home court advantage in the NBA Finals is winning percentage, then head-to-head record, followed by record vs. opposite conference.

=== Tiebreaker rules ===
The tiebreakers that determine seedings are:

1. Division leader wins tie from team not leading a division
2. Head-to-head record
3. Division record (if all the tied teams are in the same division)
4. Conference record
5. Record vs. playoff teams, own conference
6. Record vs. playoff teams, other conference (only in two-way tie)
7. Point differential, all games

If there are more than two teams tied, the team that wins the tiebreaker gets the highest seed, while the other teams were "re-broken" from the first step until all ties were resolved. Since the three division winners were guaranteed a spot in the top four, ties to determine the division winners had to be broken before any other ties.

=== Possible future changes ===
As the 2014–15 regular season proceeded into February 2015, the ninth-place team in the Western Conference had a better record than the eighth-place team in the East. This led NBA Commissioner Adam Silver to suggest changing the playoff format, where the top 16 teams throughout the entire league would qualify, regardless of division or conference. Silver then stated that the league might not be able to implement such changes until the 2016–17 season at the earliest.

== Playoff qualifying ==
On March 3, the Atlanta Hawks became the first team to clinch a playoff spot. This was the earliest a team had clinched a playoff spot since the 1995–96 Chicago Bulls clinched on March 2. The Golden State Warriors became the first Western Conference team to clinch a playoff spot on March 16.

== Bracket ==
Teams in bold advanced to the next round. The numbers to the left of each team indicate the team's seeding in its conference, and the numbers to the right indicate the number of games the team won in that round. The division champions are marked by an asterisk. Teams with home court advantage are shown in Italics.

First Round	Conference Semifinals
**E1**	**Atlanta***	**4**
E8	Brooklyn	2
**E1**	**Atlanta***	**4**
E5	Washington	2
E4	Toronto*	0
**E5**	**Washington**	**4**
**Eastern Conference**
**E3**	**Chicago**	**4**
E6	Milwaukee	2
E3	Chicago	2
**E2**	**Cleveland***	**4**
**E2**	**Cleveland***	**4**
E7	Boston	0
**W1**	**Golden State***	**4**
W8	New Orleans	0
**W1**	**Golden State***	**4**
W5	Memphis	2
W4	Portland*	1
**W5**	**Memphis**	**4**
**Western Conference**
**W3**	**LA Clippers**	**4**
W6	San Antonio	3
W3	LA Clippers	3
**W2**	**Houston***	**4**
**W2**	**Houston***	**4**
W7	Dallas	1

Conference Finals
E1	Atlanta*	0
**E2**	**Cleveland***	**4**
**W1**	**Golden State***	**4**
W2	Houston*	1

NBA Finals
E2	Cleveland*	2
**W1**	**Golden State***	**4**

- * Division winner
- **Bold** Series winner
- Italics Team with home-court advantage

=== Notes ===
Memphis had home court advantage in the first round despite not being a higher seed as they had a better regular season record than their opponent, but did not have the best record of the non-division-champion playoff teams in the West. This rule was changed as a result of this season's playoffs. The southwest division, which the Grizzlies are a part of, also had all five teams make the playoffs this year. This had only happened 3 times before.

== First round ==
All times are in Eastern Daylight Time (UTC−4)

=== Eastern Conference first round ===
==== (1) Atlanta Hawks vs. (8) Brooklyn Nets ====
TNT

April 19
5:30 pm

Boxscore

Brooklyn Nets 92, Atlanta Hawks 99
Scoring by quarter: 20–32, 25–23, 17–19, 30–25
Pts: Johnson, Lopez 17 each Rebs: Brook Lopez 14; Asts: Joe Johnson 6	Pts: Kyle Korver 21; Rebs: Al Horford 10; Asts: three players 3 each
Atlanta leads series, 1–0

Philips Arena, Atlanta
Attendance: 18,440
Referees: Danny Crawford, Marc Davis, Bennett Salvatore

ESPN

April 22
7:00 pm

Boxscore

Brooklyn Nets 91, Atlanta Hawks 96
Scoring by quarter: 24–29, 23–21, 20–25, 24–21
Pts: Jarrett Jack 23; Rebs: Deron Williams 10; Asts: Deron Williams 8	Pts: Paul Millsap 19; Rebs: Al Horford 13; Asts: Al Horford 7
Atlanta leads series, 2–0

Philips Arena, Atlanta
Attendance: 18,207
Referees: Mike Callahan, Michael Smith, Zach Zarba

TNT

April 25
3:00 pm

Boxscore

Atlanta Hawks 83, Brooklyn Nets 91
Scoring by quarter: 16–31, 24–16, 22–20, 21–24
Pts: DeMarre Carroll 22; Rebs: Paul Millsap 17; Asts: Jeff Teague 6	Pts: Brook Lopez 22; Rebs: Brook Lopez 13; Asts: Jarrett Jack 8
Atlanta leads series, 2–1

Barclays Center, Brooklyn, New York City
Attendance: 17,732
Referees: Joe Crawford, Tony Brown, Ron Garretson

NBA TV

April 27
7:00 pm

Boxscore

Atlanta Hawks 115, Brooklyn Nets 120 (OT)
Scoring by quarter: 24–25, 27–20, 31–29, 22–30, Overtime: 11–16
Pts: Carroll, Teague 20 each Rebs: Paul Millsap 12; Asts: Jeff Teague 11	Pts: Deron Williams 35; Rebs: Brook Lopez 10; Asts: Deron Williams 7
Series tied, 2–2

Barclays Center, Brooklyn, New York City
Attendance: 17,732
Referees: James Capers, Eric Lewis, Jason Phillips

TNT

April 29
7:00 pm

Boxscore

Brooklyn Nets 97, Atlanta Hawks 107
Scoring by quarter: 16–33, 28–20, 26–29, 27–25
Pts: Alan Anderson 23; Rebs: Joe Johnson 9 Asts: Jack, Williams 6 each	Pts: DeMarre Carroll 24; Rebs: Al Horford 15; Asts: Jeff Teague 8
Atlanta leads series, 3–2

Philips Arena, Atlanta
Attendance: 18,105
Referees: Monty McCutchen, David Jones, James Williams

ESPN

May 1
8:00 pm

Boxscore

Atlanta Hawks 111, Brooklyn Nets 87
Scoring by quarter: 36–23, 15–22, 41–21, 19–21
Pts: Paul Millsap 25; Rebs: Paul Millsap 9 Asts: Jeff Teague 13	Pts: Brook Lopez 19; Rebs: Jack, Lopez 7 each Asts: Joe Johnson 6
Atlanta wins series, 4–2

Barclays Center, Brooklyn, New York City
Attendance: 17,732
Referees: Ken Mauer, John Goble, Ed Malloy

Regular-season series
Atlanta won 4–0 in the regular-season series

December 5, 2014

Recap

Atlanta Hawks 98, Brooklyn Nets 75

Barclays Center, Brooklyn, New York City

January 28, 2015

Recap

Brooklyn Nets 102, Atlanta Hawks 113

Philips Arena, Atlanta

April 4, 2015

Recap

Brooklyn Nets 99, Atlanta Hawks 131

Philips Arena, Atlanta

April 8, 2015

Recap

Atlanta Hawks 114, Brooklyn Nets 111

Barclays Center, Brooklyn, New York City

This was the first meeting in the playoffs between the Hawks and Nets.

==== (2) Cleveland Cavaliers vs. (7) Boston Celtics ====
ABC

April 19
3:00 pm

Boxscore

Boston Celtics 100, Cleveland Cavaliers 113
Scoring by quarter: 31–27, 23–35, 22–29, 24–22
Pts: Isaiah Thomas 22; Rebs: Evan Turner 7 Asts: Isaiah Thomas 10	Pts: Kyrie Irving 30; Rebs: Kevin Love 12; Asts: LeBron James 7
Cleveland leads series, 1–0

Quicken Loans Arena, Cleveland, Ohio
Attendance: 20,562
Referees: Mike Callahan, Pat Fraher, Zach Zarba

TNT

April 21
7:00 pm

Boxscore

Boston Celtics 91, Cleveland Cavaliers 99
Scoring by quarter: 26–25, 24–26, 18–24, 23–24
Pts: Isaiah Thomas 22; Rebs: Evan Turner 12; Asts: Isaiah Thomas 7	Pts: LeBron James 30; Rebs: Tristan Thompson 11; Asts: LeBron James 7
Cleveland leads series, 2–0

Quicken Loans Arena, Cleveland, Ohio
Attendance: 20,562
Referees: Danny Crawford, Marc Davis, Bennett Salvatore

TNT

April 23
7:00 pm

Boxscore

Cleveland Cavaliers 103, Boston Celtics 95
Scoring by quarter: 31–25, 25–23, 28–28, 19–19
Pts: LeBron James 31; Rebs: LeBron James 11; Asts: Kyrie Irving 6	Pts: Evan Turner 19; Rebs: Sullinger, Turner 8 each Asts: Evan Turner 8
Cleveland leads series, 3–0

TD Garden, Boston
Attendance: 18,624
Referees: James Capers, David Guthrie, Jason Phillips

ABC

April 26
1:00 pm

Boxscore

Cleveland Cavaliers 101, Boston Celtics 93
Scoring by quarter: 29–19, 28–17, 13–25, 31–32
Pts: LeBron James 27; Rebs: Irving, Mozgov 11 each Asts: LeBron James 8	Pts: Sullinger, Thomas 21 each Rebs: Jared Sullinger 11; Asts: Isaiah Thomas 9
Cleveland wins series, 4–0

TD Garden, Boston
Attendance: 18,624
Referees: Tony Brothers, John Goble, Leroy Richardson

Regular-season series
Tied 2–2 in the regular-season series

November 14, 2014

Recap

Cleveland Cavaliers 122, Boston Celtics 121

TD Garden, Boston

March 3, 2015

Recap

Boston Celtics 79, Cleveland Cavaliers 110

Quicken Loans Arena, Cleveland, Ohio

April 10, 2015

Recap

Boston Celtics 99, Cleveland Cavaliers 90

Quicken Loans Arena, Cleveland, Ohio

April 12, 2015

Recap

Cleveland Cavaliers 78, Boston Celtics 117

TD Garden, Boston

Previous playoff series
Boston leads 4–1 in all-time playoff series

1976

Boston Celtics 4, Cleveland Cavaliers 2

1976 Eastern Conference Finals

1985

Boston Celtics 3, Cleveland Cavaliers 1

1985 Eastern Conference First Round

1992

Cleveland Cavaliers 4, Boston Celtics 3

1992 Eastern Conference Semifinals

2008

Boston Celtics 4, Cleveland Cavaliers 3

2008 Eastern Conference Semifinals

2010

Cleveland Cavaliers 2, Boston Celtics 4

2010 Eastern Conference Semifinals

==== (3) Chicago Bulls vs. (6) Milwaukee Bucks ====
ESPN

April 18
7:00 pm

Boxscore

Milwaukee Bucks 91, Chicago Bulls 103
Scoring by quarter: 29–30, 22–30, 24–26, 16–17
Pts: Khris Middleton 18; Rebs: Zaza Pachulia 10; Asts: Jerryd Bayless 5	Pts: Jimmy Butler 25; Rebs: Pau Gasol 13; Asts: Derrick Rose 7
Chicago leads series, 1–0

United Center, Chicago
Attendance: 21,812
Referees: Scott Foster, Kane Fitzgerald, Bill Kennedy

TNT

April 20
8:00 pm

Boxscore

Milwaukee Bucks 82, Chicago Bulls 91
Scoring by quarter: 16–11, 22–28, 30–32, 14–20
Pts: Khris Middleton 22; Rebs: Giannis Antetokounmpo 11; Asts: Giannis Antetokounmpo 4	Pts: Jimmy Butler 31; Rebs: Joakim Noah 19; Asts: Derrick Rose 9
Chicago leads series, 2–0

United Center, Chicago
Attendance: 21,661
Referees: James Williams, Bill Spooner, Monty McCutchen

NBA TV

April 23
8:00 pm

Boxscore

Chicago Bulls 113, Milwaukee Bucks 106 (2OT)
Scoring by quarter: 27–27, 22–26, 25–18, 21–24, Overtime: 6–6, 12–5
Pts: Derrick Rose 34; Rebs: Pau Gasol 14; Asts: Derrick Rose 8	Pts: Giannis Antetokounmpo 25; Rebs: John Henson 14; Asts: Michael Carter-Williams 9
Chicago leads series, 3–0

BMO Harris Bradley Center, Milwaukee, Wisconsin
Attendance: 18,717
Referees: Ken Mauer, Brian Forte, Ed Malloy

TNT

April 25
5:30 pm

Boxscore

Chicago Bulls 90, Milwaukee Bucks 92
Scoring by quarter: 23–19, 27–31, 21–23, 19–19
Pts: Jimmy Butler 33; Rebs: Pau Gasol 10; Asts: Derrick Rose 6	Pts: O. J. Mayo 18; Rebs: Giannis Antetokounmpo 8 Asts: three players 5 each
Chicago leads series, 3–1

BMO Harris Bradley Center, Milwaukee, Wisconsin
Attendance: 18,717
Referees: Zach Zarba, David Guthrie, Jason Phillips

During the final minute of the game, Derrick Rose drove inside then passed to Pau Gasol who laid it in as he was fouled. Gasol would then make the free throw and tie the game at 90. Then, when Rose tried to win the series for Chicago, he crossed but then was stripped by Khris Middleton. He then attempted a half court shot, which was blocked by Jimmy Butler when timeout was called. With 1.3 seconds left, Jared Dudley found the lead pass for Jerryd Bayless, due to a defensive breakdown by Rose, who then hit the game-winning lay-up at the buzzer, allowing the Bucks to stave off elimination for at least one more game.

TNT

April 27
8:00 pm

Boxscore

Milwaukee Bucks 94, Chicago Bulls 88
Scoring by quarter: 23–22, 29–27, 24–21, 18–18
Pts: Michael Carter-Williams 22; Rebs: John Henson 14; Asts: Michael Carter-Williams 9	Pts: Pau Gasol 25; Rebs: Joakim Noah 13; Asts: Butler, Noah, 6 each
Chicago leads series, 3–2

United Center, Chicago
Attendance: 21,814
Referees: Joe Crawford, Sean Corbin, Sean Wright

TNT

April 30
7:00 pm

Boxscore

Chicago Bulls 120, Milwaukee Bucks 66
Scoring by quarter: 34–16, 31–17, 26–19, 29–14
Pts: Mike Dunleavy Jr. 20; Rebs: Joakim Noah 10; Asts: Derrick Rose 7	Pts: Zaza Pachulia 8 Rebs: Miles Plumlee 6 Asts: Jerryd Bayless 5
Chicago wins series, 4–2

BMO Harris Bradley Center, Milwaukee, Wisconsin
Attendance: 18,717
Referees: Mike Callahan, Derrick Stafford, Tom Washington

Regular-season series
Chicago won 3–1 in the regular-season series

November 5, 2014

Recap

Chicago Bulls 95, Milwaukee Bucks 86

BMO Harris Bradley Center, Milwaukee, Wisconsin

January 10, 2015

Recap

Milwaukee Bucks 87, Chicago Bulls 95

United Center, Chicago, Illinois

February 23, 2015

Recap

Milwaukee Bucks 71, Chicago Bulls 87

United Center, Chicago, Illinois

April 1, 2015

Recap

Chicago Bulls 91, Milwaukee Bucks 95

BMO Harris Bradley Center, Milwaukee, Wisconsin

- As of 2026, this remains the last playoff series the Bulls had won.
- This is the most recent playoff series between the Bulls & Bucks until 2022.

This was the fourth playoff meeting between these two teams, with the Bucks winning two out of the first three meeting.

Previous playoffs series
Milwaukee leads 2–1 in all-time playoff series

1974

Chicago Bulls 0, Milwaukee Bucks 4

1974 Western Conference Finals

1985

Milwaukee Bucks 3, Chicago Bulls 1

1985 Eastern Conference First Round

1990

Chicago Bulls 3, Milwaukee Bucks 1

1990 Eastern Conference First Round

==== (4) Toronto Raptors vs. (5) Washington Wizards ====
ESPN

April 18
12:30 pm

Boxscore

Washington Wizards 93, Toronto Raptors 86 (OT)
Scoring by quarter: 19–23, 27–19, 19–14, 17–26, Overtime: 11–4
Pts: Paul Pierce 20; Rebs: Nenê 13; Asts: John Wall 8	Pts: Amir Johnson 18; Rebs: DeMar DeRozan 11; Asts: DeMar DeRozan 6
Washington leads series, 1–0

Air Canada Centre, Toronto, Ontario
Attendance: 19,800
Referees: Monty McCutchen, Derrick Stafford, Josh Tiven

NBA TV

April 21
8:00 pm

Boxscore

Washington Wizards 117, Toronto Raptors 106
Scoring by quarter: 26–31, 34–18, 37–26, 20–31
Pts: Bradley Beal 28; Rebs: Nenê, Porter Jr. 9 each Asts: John Wall 17	Pts: DeRozan, Williams 20 each Rebs: Jonas Valančiūnas 10; Asts: DeMar DeRozan 7
Washington leads series, 2–0

Air Canada Centre, Toronto, Ontario
Attendance: 19,800
Referees: Scott Foster, Bill Kennedy, Courtney Kirkland

ESPN2

April 24
8:00 pm

Boxscore

Toronto Raptors 99, Washington Wizards 106
Scoring by quarter: 35–33, 13–21, 22–18, 29–34
Pts: DeMar DeRozan 32; Rebs: Amir Johnson 12; Asts: Kyle Lowry 7	Pts: Marcin Gortat 24; Rebs: Marcin Gortat 13; Asts: John Wall 15
Washington leads series, 3–0

Verizon Center, Washington, D.C.
Attendance: 20,356
Referees: Tony Brothers, Sean Corbin, John Goble

TNT

April 26
6:30 pm

Boxscore

Toronto Raptors 94, Washington Wizards 125
Scoring by quarter: 22–36, 28–30, 20–36, 24–23
Pts: Kyle Lowry 21; Rebs: Jonas Valančiūnas 9 Asts: three players 4 each	Pts: Bradley Beal 23; Rebs: Marcin Gortat 11; Asts: John Wall 10
Washington wins series, 4–0

Verizon Center, Washington, D.C.
Attendance: 20,356
Referees: Ken Mauer, Brian Forte, Ed Malloy

Regular-season series
Toronto won 3–0 in the regular-season series

November 7, 2014

Recap

Washington Wizards 84, Toronto Raptors 103

Air Canada Centre, Toronto, Ontario

January 31, 2015

Recap

Toronto Raptors 120, Washington Wizards 116 (OT)

Verizon Center, Washington, D.C.

February 11, 2015

Recap

Washington Wizards 93, Toronto Raptors 95

Air Canada Centre, Toronto, Ontario

- This marked the first (and as of 2026 only) successful sweep for the Wizards.

This was the first meeting in the playoffs between the Raptors and Wizards.

=== Western Conference first round ===
==== (1) Golden State Warriors vs. (8) New Orleans Pelicans ====
ABC

April 18
3:30 pm

Boxscore

New Orleans Pelicans 99, Golden State Warriors 106
Scoring by quarter: 13–28, 28–31, 25–25, 33–22
Pts: Anthony Davis 35; Rebs: Aşık, Pondexter 9 each Asts: Cole, Pondexter 6 each	Pts: Stephen Curry 34; Rebs: Andrew Bogut 14; Asts: Draymond Green 7
Golden State leads series, 1–0

Oracle Arena, Oakland, California
Attendance: 19,596
Referees: Tony Brothers, Sean Corbin, Jason Phillips

TNT

April 20
10:30 pm

Boxscore

New Orleans Pelicans 87, Golden State Warriors 97
Scoring by quarter: 28–17, 24–38, 19–16, 16–26
Pts: Anthony Davis 26; Rebs: Ömer Aşık 13; Asts: Tyreke Evans 7	Pts: Klay Thompson 26; Rebs: Andrew Bogut 14; Asts: Stephen Curry 6
Golden State leads series, 2–0

Oracle Arena, Oakland, California
Attendance: 19,596
Referees: Joe Crawford, Ron Garretson, Sean Wright

TNT

April 23
9:30 pm

Boxscore

Golden State Warriors 123, New Orleans Pelicans 119 (OT)
Scoring by quarter: 25–26, 27–37, 17–26, 39–19, Overtime: 15–11
Pts: Stephen Curry 40; Rebs: Draymond Green 17; Asts: Stephen Curry 9	Pts: Anthony Davis 29; Rebs: Anthony Davis 15; Asts: Tyreke Evans 8
Golden State leads series, 3–0

Smoothie King Center, New Orleans, Louisiana
Attendance: 18,444
Referees: Scott Foster, Kane Fitzgerald, Derrick Stafford

After Anthony Davis split a pair of free throws, Curry missed an attempted game-tying three, but Marreese Speights grabbed the offensive rebound and Curry hit another three to tie the game at 108. The Warriors would win in OT.

ESPN

April 25
8:00 pm

Boxscore

Golden State Warriors 109, New Orleans Pelicans 98
Scoring by quarter: 31–24, 36–30, 21–13, 21–31
Pts: Stephen Curry 39; Rebs: Draymond Green 10; Asts: Stephen Curry 9	Pts: Anthony Davis 36; Rebs: Anthony Davis 11; Asts: Evans, Gordon 5 each
Golden State wins series, 4–0

Smoothie King Center, New Orleans, Louisiana
Attendance: 18,443
Referees: Danny Crawford, Derrick Collins, Marc Davis

Regular-season series
Golden State won 3–1 in the regular-season series

December 4, 2014

Recap

New Orleans Pelicans 85, Golden State Warriors 112

Oracle Arena, Oakland, California

December 14, 2014

Recap

Golden State Warriors 128, New Orleans Pelicans 122 (OT)

Smoothie King Center, New Orleans, Louisiana

March 20, 2015

Recap

New Orleans Pelicans 96, Golden State Warriors 112

Oracle Arena, Oakland, California

April 7, 2015

Recap

Golden State Warriors 100, New Orleans Pelicans 103

Smoothie King Center, New Orleans, Louisiana

This was the first meeting in the playoffs between the Warriors and Pelicans.

==== (2) Houston Rockets vs. (7) Dallas Mavericks ====
ESPN

April 18
9:30 pm

Boxscore

Dallas Mavericks 108, Houston Rockets 118
Scoring by quarter: 19–32, 36–27, 22–25, 31–34
Pts: Dirk Nowitzki 24; Rebs: Tyson Chandler 18; Asts: Rajon Rondo 5	Pts: James Harden 24; Rebs: Trevor Ariza 11; Asts: James Harden 11
Houston leads series, 1–0

Toyota Center, Houston, Texas
Attendance: 18,231
Referees: Joe Crawford, Tony Brown, Ron Garretson

TNT

April 21
9:30 pm

Boxscore

Dallas Mavericks 99, Houston Rockets 111
Scoring by quarter: 24–23, 27–30, 29–28, 19–30
Pts: Monta Ellis 24; Rebs: Dirk Nowitzki 13; Asts: Ellis, Felton 3	Pts: Dwight Howard 28; Rebs: Dwight Howard 12; Asts: Josh Smith 9
Houston leads series, 2–0

Toyota Center, Houston, Texas
Attendance: 18,243
Referees: Ken Mauer, David Jones, Ed Malloy

ESPN

April 24
7:00 pm

Boxscore

Houston Rockets 130, Dallas Mavericks 128
Scoring by quarter: 42–36, 23–36, 36–27, 29–29
Pts: James Harden 42; Rebs: Dwight Howard 26; Asts: James Harden 9	Pts: Ellis, Nowitzki 34 each Rebs: Nowitzki, Chandler 8 each Asts: Barea, Ellis 9 each
Houston leads series, 3–0

American Airlines Center, Dallas
Attendance: 20,651
Referees: Mike Callahan, Michael Smith, Tom Washington

TNT

April 26
9:00 pm

Boxscore

Houston Rockets 109, Dallas Mavericks 121
Scoring by quarter: 34–25, 19–36, 22–33, 34–27
Pts: James Harden 24; Rebs: Dwight Howard 7 Asts: Harden, Prigioni 5	Pts: Monta Ellis 31; Rebs: Tyson Chandler 14; Asts: José Juan Barea 10
Houston leads series, 3–1

American Airlines Center, Dallas
Attendance: 20,589
Referees: Monty McCutchen, Derrick Stafford, Josh Tiven

TNT

April 28
8:00 pm

Boxscore

Dallas Mavericks 94, Houston Rockets 103
Scoring by quarter: 22–31, 28–25, 25–26, 19–21
Pts: Monta Ellis 25; Rebs: Dirk Nowitzki 14; Asts: José Juan Barea 9	Pts: James Harden 28; Rebs: Dwight Howard 19; Asts: James Harden 8
Houston wins series, 4–1

Toyota Center, Houston, Texas
Attendance: 18,231
Referees: Tony Brothers, John Goble, Zach Zarba

Regular-season series
Houston won 3–1 in the regular-season series

November 22, 2014

Recap

Dallas Mavericks 92, Houston Rockets 95

Toyota Center, Houston, Texas

January 28, 2015

Recap

Dallas Mavericks 94, Houston Rockets 99

Toyota Center, Houston, Texas

February 20, 2015

Recap

Houston Rockets 100, Dallas Mavericks 111

American Airlines Center, Dallas

April 2, 2015

Recap

Houston Rockets 108, Dallas Mavericks 101

American Airlines Center, Dallas

This was the third playoff meeting between these two teams, with the Mavericks winning both previous meetings.

Previous playoff series
Dallas leads 2–0 in all-time playoff series

1988

Dallas Mavericks 3, Houston Rockets 1

1988 Western Conference First Round

2005

Dallas Mavericks 4, Houston Rockets 3

2005 Western Conference First Round

==== (3) Los Angeles Clippers vs. (6) San Antonio Spurs ====
TNT

April 19
10:30 pm

Boxscore

San Antonio Spurs 92, Los Angeles Clippers 107
Scoring by quarter: 18–30, 25–19, 21–30, 28–28
Pts: Kawhi Leonard 18; Rebs: Tim Duncan 11; Asts: Manu Ginóbili 6	Pts: Chris Paul 32; Rebs: DeAndre Jordan 14; Asts: Griffin, Paul 6 each
LA Clippers lead series, 1–0

Staples Center, Los Angeles
Attendance: 19,309
Referees: Ken Mauer, David Jones, Ed Malloy

TNT

April 22
10:30 pm

Boxscore

San Antonio Spurs 111, Los Angeles Clippers 107 (OT)
Scoring by quarter: 28–24, 24–23, 25–27, 17–20, Overtime: 17–13
Pts: Tim Duncan 28; Rebs: Tim Duncan 11; Asts: Boris Diaw 6	Pts: Blake Griffin 29; Rebs: DeAndre Jordan 15; Asts: Blake Griffin 11
Series tied, 1–1

Staples Center, Los Angeles
Attendance: 19,482
Referees: Joe Crawford, Ron Garretson, Sean Wright

ESPN

April 24
9:30 pm

Boxscore

Los Angeles Clippers 73, San Antonio Spurs 100
Scoring by quarter: 16–25, 22–21, 11–24, 24–30
Pts: Blake Griffin 14; Rebs: Blake Griffin 10; Asts: Blake Griffin 5	Pts: Kawhi Leonard 32; Rebs: Tim Duncan 7 Asts: Manu Ginóbili 6
San Antonio leads series, 2–1

AT&T Center, San Antonio
Attendance: 18,581
Referees: Monty McCutchen, Bill Spooner, Gary Zielinski

ABC

April 26
3:30 pm

Boxscore

Los Angeles Clippers 114, San Antonio Spurs 105
Scoring by quarter: 25–25, 26–22, 30–29, 33–29
Pts: Chris Paul 34; Rebs: Blake Griffin 19; Asts: Griffin, Paul 7 each	Pts: Kawhi Leonard 26; Rebs: Tim Duncan 14; Asts: Kawhi Leonard 5
Series tied, 2–2

AT&T Center, San Antonio
Attendance: 18,581
Referees: Mike Callahan, Pat Fraher, Tom Washington

TNT

April 28
10:30 pm

Boxscore

San Antonio Spurs 111, Los Angeles Clippers 107
Scoring by quarter: 22–27, 31–27, 29–28, 29–25
Pts: Tim Duncan 21; Rebs: Tim Duncan 11; Asts: Manu Ginóbili 6	Pts: Blake Griffin 30; Rebs: Griffin, Jordan 14 each Asts: Chris Paul 10
San Antonio leads series, 3–2

Staples Center, Los Angeles
Attendance: 19,571
Referees: Scott Foster, Bill Kennedy, Josh Tiven

TNT

April 30
9:30 pm

Boxscore

Los Angeles Clippers 102, San Antonio Spurs 96
Scoring by quarter: 26–26, 25–25, 25–21, 26–24
Pts: Blake Griffin 26; Rebs: DeAndre Jordan 14; Asts: Chris Paul 15	Pts: Marco Belinelli 23; Rebs: Tim Duncan 13; Asts: Tony Parker 7
Series tied, 3–3

AT&T Center, San Antonio
Attendance: 18,581
Referees: Danny Crawford, Marc Davis, Zach Zarba

TNT

May 2
8:00 pm

Boxscore

San Antonio Spurs 109, Los Angeles Clippers 111
Scoring by quarter: 30–28, 25–29, 23–22, 31–32
Pts: Tim Duncan 27; Rebs: Tim Duncan 11; Asts: Manu Ginóbili 7	Pts: Chris Paul 27; Rebs: DeAndre Jordan 14; Asts: Blake Griffin 10
LA Clippers win series, 4–3

Staples Center, Los Angeles
Attendance: 19,588
Referees: Monty McCutchen, James Capers, Jason Phillips

In Game 1, the Clippers had a dominant game. It was close in the first half, but the Clippers pulled away in the second half. Chris Paul scored 32 points, while Blake Griffin scored 27 points. This helped the Clippers win 107–92.

Game 2 was much closer, requiring overtime. The Spurs won 111–107 in the Staples Center, tying the series 1–1, led by Tim Duncan's 27 points.

In Game 3, the Spurs completely controlled the offense, and never trailed. They won 100–73 with Kawhi Leonard scoring 32 points. In Game 4, the Clippers won 114–105. Chris Paul scored 34 points and 7 assists.

It was a tight game in Game 5 in the Staples Center, especially in the 4th quarter. At the end of the game, DeAndre Jordan tipped the ball in; however, the refs called goaltending. The Spurs prevailed 111–107, led by Tim Duncan's 24 points and 11 rebounds.

In Game 6, Spurs Tim Duncan, Manu Ginóbili, Tony Parker, Kawhi Leonard along with Clippers Chris Paul and Blake Griffin struggled offensively. The Spurs gave up a 10-point lead, allowing the Clippers to win 102–96.

Game 7 was a very tight game, featuring 31 lead changes and 19 ties. In the first half, Chris Paul injured his hamstring, but returned in the third quarter, concluding that quarter with a buzzer beater 3-pointer, giving them a 79–78 lead. The fourth quarter was a nail-biter, with the Spurs leading in the beginning and the Clippers at the end. With 1 second left in the game, Chris Paul hit the game winner, and the Clippers moved on to the second round by a meager two-point margin. The final score was 111–109.

Regular-season series
Tied 2–2 in the regular-season series

November 10, 2014

Recap

San Antonio Spurs 89, Los Angeles Clippers 85

Staples Center, Los Angeles

December 22, 2014

Recap

Los Angeles Clippers 118, San Antonio Spurs 125

AT&T Center, San Antonio

January 31, 2015

Recap

Los Angeles Clippers 105, San Antonio Spurs 85

AT&T Center, San Antonio

February 19, 2015

Recap

San Antonio Spurs 115, Los Angeles Clippers 119

Staples Center, Los Angeles

This was the second playoff meeting between these two teams, with the Spurs winning the only meeting.

Previous playoff series
San Antonio leads 1–0 in all-time playoff series

2012

San Antonio Spurs 4, Los Angeles Clippers 0

2012 Western Conference Semifinals

- This would be the Clippers last playoff series win until 2020.

==== (4) Portland Trail Blazers vs. (5) Memphis Grizzlies ====
TNT

April 19
8:00 pm

Boxscore

Portland Trail Blazers 86, Memphis Grizzlies 100
Scoring by quarter: 15–25, 24–33, 23–28, 24–14
Pts: LaMarcus Aldridge 32; Rebs: LaMarcus Aldridge 14; Asts: Batum, Blake 4 each	Pts: Beno Udrih 20; Rebs: Randolph, Gasol 11 each Asts: Gasol, Udrih 7 each
Memphis leads series, 1–0

FedExForum, Memphis, Tennessee
Attendance: 18,119
Referees: James Capers, Eric Lewis, Tom Washington

TNT

April 22
8:00 pm

Boxscore

Portland Trail Blazers 82, Memphis Grizzlies 97
Scoring by quarter: 21–19, 18–31, 21–23, 22–24
Pts: LaMarcus Aldridge 24; Rebs: LaMarcus Aldridge 14; Asts: Nicolas Batum 7	Pts: Lee, Conley 18 each Rebs: Zach Randolph 10; Asts: Mike Conley Jr. 6
Memphis leads series, 2–0

FedExForum, Memphis, Tennessee
Attendance: 18,119
Referees: Tony Brothers, Leroy Richardson, Bill Spooner

ESPN

April 25
10:30 pm

Boxscore

Memphis Grizzlies 115, Portland Trail Blazers 109
Scoring by quarter: 24–19, 38–30, 23–26, 30–34
Pts: Marc Gasol 25; Rebs: Marc Gasol 7 Asts: three players 4 each	Pts: Nicolas Batum 27; Rebs: LaMarcus Aldridge 7 Asts: Damian Lillard 9
Memphis leads series, 3–0

Moda Center, Portland, Oregon
Attendance: 19,945
Referees: Scott Foster, Mark Ayotte, Bill Kennedy

TNT

April 27
10:30 pm

Boxscore

Memphis Grizzlies 92, Portland Trail Blazers 99
Scoring by quarter: 22–27, 26–28, 27–13, 17–31
Pts: Marc Gasol 21; Rebs: Tony Allen 10; Asts: Marc Gasol 6	Pts: Damian Lillard 32; Rebs: Batum, Leonard 13 each Asts: Damian Lillard 7
Memphis leads series, 3–1

Moda Center, Portland, Oregon
Attendance: 19,541
Referees: Danny Crawford, Derrick Collins, Marc Davis

TNT

April 29
9:30 pm

Boxscore

Portland Trail Blazers 93, Memphis Grizzlies 99
Scoring by quarter: 20–20, 19–26, 27–22, 27–31
Pts: CJ McCollum 33; Rebs: Nicolas Batum 10; Asts: Nicolas Batum 7	Pts: Marc Gasol 26; Rebs: Marc Gasol 14; Asts: Allen, Calathes 4 each
Memphis wins series, 4–1

FedExForum, Memphis, Tennessee
Attendance: 18,119
Referees: Ken Mauer, Brian Forte, Ed Malloy

Regular-season series
Memphis won 4–0 in the regular-season series

November 28, 2014

Recap

Memphis Grizzlies 112, Portland Trail Blazers 99

Moda Center, Portland, Oregon

January 17, 2015

Recap

Portland Trail Blazers 98, Memphis Grizzlies 102

FedExForum, Memphis, Tennessee

February 22, 2015

Recap

Memphis Grizzlies 98, Portland Trail Blazers 92

Moda Center, Portland, Oregon

March 21, 2015

Recap

Portland Trail Blazers 86, Memphis Grizzlies 97

FedExForum, Memphis, Tennessee

This was the first meeting in the playoffs between the Blazers and Grizzlies.

== Conference semifinals ==
=== Eastern Conference semifinals ===
==== (1) Atlanta Hawks vs. (5) Washington Wizards ====
ABC

May 3
1:00 p.m.

Boxscore

Washington Wizards 104, Atlanta Hawks 98
Scoring by quarter: 26–37, 27–26, 28–20, 23–15
Pts: Bradley Beal 28; Rebs: Marcin Gortat 12; Asts: John Wall 13	Pts: DeMarre Carroll 24; Rebs: Al Horford 17; Asts: Paul Millsap 8
Washington leads series, 1–0

Philips Arena, Atlanta
Attendance: 18,148
Referees: Scott Foster, Pat Fraher, Ron Garretson

TNT

May 5
8:00 p.m.

Boxscore

Washington Wizards 90, Atlanta Hawks 106
Scoring by quarter: 20–28, 26–25, 29–27, 15–26
Pts: Bradley Beal 20; Rebs: Marcin Gortat 9 Asts: Bradley Beal 7	Pts: DeMarre Carroll 22; Rebs: Paul Millsap 11; Asts: Jeff Teague 8
Series tied, 1–1

Philips Arena, Atlanta
Attendance: 18,131
Referees: Danny Crawford, Marc Davis, Josh Tiven

ESPN

May 9
5:00 p.m.

Boxscore

Atlanta Hawks 101, Washington Wizards 103
Scoring by quarter: 18–28, 25–28, 23–29, 35–18
Pts: Schröder, Teague 18 each Rebs: Al Horford 10; Asts: Jeff Teague 7	Pts: three players 17 each Rebs: Otto Porter 9 Asts: Bradley Beal 8
Washington leads series, 2–1

Verizon Center, Washington, D.C.
Attendance: 20,356
Referees: Joe Crawford, Bennett Salvatore, Zach Zarba

The Hawks rallied from a 19-point deficit heading into the final period to tie the score at 101 with a basket. On the ensuing possession, Paul Pierce, who was double-teamed, hit a fadeaway jumper off the backboard at the buzzer to give the Wizards a 103–101 victory and a 2–1 lead in the series. After the game, when ESPN analyst Chris Broussard asked Pierce if he called bank on that shot, he responded, "I called game!"

TNT

May 11
7:00 p.m.

Boxscore

Atlanta Hawks 106, Washington Wizards 101
Scoring by quarter: 29–26, 36–29, 20–20, 21–26
Pts: Jeff Teague 26; Rebs: Al Horford 10; Asts: Schröder, Teague 8 each	Pts: Bradley Beal 34; Rebs: Marcin Gortat 8 Asts: Bradley Beal 7
Series tied, 2–2

Verizon Center, Washington, D.C.
Attendance: 20,356
Referees: Ken Mauer, John Goble, Ed Malloy

TNT

May 13
8:00 p.m.

Boxscore

Washington Wizards 81, Atlanta Hawks 82
Scoring by quarter: 19–23, 28–18, 15–22, 19–19
Pts: Bradley Beal 23; Rebs: Otto Porter Jr. 10; Asts: John Wall 7	Pts: Al Horford 23; Rebs: Al Horford 11; Asts: Dennis Schröder 7
Atlanta leads series, 3–2

Philips Arena, Atlanta
Attendance: 18,854
Referees: Mike Callahan, Tony Brothers, Tom Washington

With 8.3 seconds left, Kyle Korver inbounded the ball to Dennis Schroder, who drives for the layup that was blocked by John Wall, then Al Horford gets the offensive rebound and hits the game-winning layup with 1.9 seconds left. John Wall then misses the half-court buzzer beater, and the Hawks take the 3–2 series lead.

ESPN

May 15
7:00 p.m.

Boxscore

Atlanta Hawks 94, Washington Wizards 91
Scoring by quarter: 19–20, 26–19, 27–25, 22–27
Pts: DeMarre Carroll 25; Rebs: Paul Millsap 13; Asts: Jeff Teague 7	Pts: Bradley Beal 29; Rebs: Nenê 11; Asts: John Wall 13
Atlanta wins series, 4–2

Verizon Center, Washington, D.C.
Attendance: 20,356
Referees: Monty McCutchen, James Capers, Derrick Stafford

The Hawks were up by 3, with 6.4 seconds to go. Bradley Beal's inbound pass went to John Wall, who tried to get open with time running down, then he passed to Paul Pierce who hit an off-balanced game-tying 3. But when officials reviewed the play, the clock reached 0:00 before Pierce released the ball and therefore the shot did not count. The Hawks won the series and advanced to the Eastern Conference Finals for the first time since 1970.

Regular-season series
Hawks won 3–1 in the regular-season series

November 25, 2014

Recap

Atlanta Hawks 106, Washington Wizards 102

Verizon Center, Washington, D.C.

January 11, 2015

Recap

Washington Wizards 89, Atlanta Hawks 120

Philips Arena, Atlanta

February 4, 2015

Recap

Washington Wizards 96, Atlanta Hawks 105

Philips Arena, Atlanta

April 12, 2015

Recap

Atlanta Hawks 99, Washington Wizards 108

Verizon Center, Washington, D.C.

This was the fifth playoff meeting between these two teams, with the Wizards (formerly known as the Bullets) winning three out of the first four meetings.

Previous playoff series
Washington leads 3–1 in all-time playoff series

1965

St. Louis Hawks 1, Baltimore Bullets 3

1965 Western Division Semifinals

1966

Baltimore Bullets 0, St. Louis Hawks 3

1966 Western Division Semifinals

1978

Washington Bullets 2, Atlanta Hawks 0

1978 Eastern Conference First Round

1979

Washington Bullets 4, Atlanta Hawks 3

1979 Eastern Conference Semifinals

==== (2) Cleveland Cavaliers vs. (3) Chicago Bulls ====
TNT

May 4
7:00 pm

Boxscore

Chicago Bulls 99, Cleveland Cavaliers 92
Scoring by quarter: 27–15, 22–29, 32–26, 18–22
Pts: Derrick Rose 25; Rebs: Pau Gasol 10; Asts: Jimmy Butler 6	Pts: Kyrie Irving 30; Rebs: LeBron James 15; Asts: LeBron James 9
Chicago leads series, 1–0

Quicken Loans Arena, Cleveland, Ohio
Attendance: 20,562
Referees: Ken Mauer, Brian Forte, Ed Malloy

The Bulls led wire to wire to go up 1–0 in the series, leading by as many as 16 points in the second quarter. The Cavs rallied to tie the game early in the third quarter. However, the Bulls went on a 15–0 run in the third quarter to regain control before holding off the Cavs late in the 4th quarter.

TNT

May 6
7:00 pm

Boxscore

Chicago Bulls 91, Cleveland Cavaliers 106
Scoring by quarter: 18–38, 27–26, 26–23, 20–19
Pts: Jimmy Butler 18; Rebs: Derrick Rose 7 Asts: Derrick Rose 10	Pts: LeBron James 33; Rebs: Tristan Thompson 12; Asts: Matthew Dellavedova 9
Series tied, 1–1

Quicken Loans Arena, Cleveland, Ohio
Attendance: 20,562
Referees: Monty McCutchen, James Capers, James Williams

Facing the possibility of going down 2–0 heading to Chicago, the Cavaliers blew out the Bulls in Game 2, leading wire to wire as they evened the series 1–1. The Cavs outscored the Bulls by 20 points in the first quarter and never looked back. The Bulls got no closer than 11 for the rest of the game. LeBron led the Cavs with 33 points on 13/29 shooting while Irving chipped in 21 points.

ESPN

May 8
8:00 p.m.

Boxscore

Cleveland Cavaliers 96, Chicago Bulls 99
Scoring by quarter: 24–18, 25–29, 24–27, 23–25
Pts: LeBron James 27; Rebs: Tristan Thompson 13; Asts: LeBron James 14	Pts: Derrick Rose 30; Rebs: Joakim Noah 11; Asts: Derrick Rose 7
Chicago leads series, 2–1

United Center, Chicago
Attendance: 22,246
Referees: Mike Callahan, Tony Brothers, Eric Lewis

J.R. Smith returned to the lineup after missing the first two games due to suspension. This was a very competitive game that saw neither team lead by more than 8 points. Trailing 94–93, LeBron James missed a go-ahead layup with under 24 seconds to play. Taj Gibson was fouled and made two free throws to make it 96–93 Bulls. James found Smith, who hit the game tying three to make it 96–96. The Bulls called timeout on their final possession of regulation. Rose shot a deep three that went off the backboard and into the basket, giving the Bulls a 99–96 win and a 2–1 series lead. Rose led the Bulls with 30 points. LeBron led the Cavs with 27, but he continued to struggle with his shot and Jimmy Butler's defense, going 8/25 for the game and 1/7 on threes.

ABC

May 10
3:30 p.m.

Boxscore

Cleveland Cavaliers 86, Chicago Bulls 84
Scoring by quarter: 26–28, 23–17, 12–23, 25–16
Pts: LeBron James 25; Rebs: LeBron James 14; Asts: LeBron James 8	Pts: Derrick Rose 31; Rebs: Joakim Noah 15; Asts: Derrick Rose 4
Series tied, 2–2

United Center, Chicago
Attendance: 22,256
Referees: Scott Foster, Jason Phillips, Tom Washington

Looking to go up 3–1 and take complete control of the series, the Bulls went up 37–29 early in the second quarter. However, the Cavs scored 16 unanswered points to go up 45–37 before settling for a 49–45 halftime lead. The Bulls dominated the third quarter, outscoring the Cavs 23–12. They led by as many as 11 points before settling for a 68–61 lead heading into the 4th quarter. Led by J.R. Smith and Timofey Mozgov, the Cavs would rally, opening the 4th quarter on a 19–5 run to take an 80–73 lead with just under 5 minutes to play. With just under 40 seconds to play, LeBron hit two consecutive free throws to put the Cavs up 84–79. Butler hit a three on the Bulls' next possession, cutting the deficit to 84–82. The Cavs were forced to burn three consecutive timeouts as they were unable to inbound the ball. Once they inbounded the ball, James tried to burn the clock down as he was double teamed by Rose and Dunleavy. However, James swung his arm at Dunleavy and committed an offensive foul, giving the ball back to the Bulls with 14 seconds remaining. Rose tied the game with a layup to even the game at 84–84 with 8 seconds remaining. James rushed down the court and tried to score the go-ahead layup but was blocked. The ball went out of bounds with 1.5 seconds remaining. On the Cavs' final possession, Matthew Dellavedova inbounded the ball to James. James fired a jumper over Butler that went through the hoop as the buzzer sounded, giving the Cavs an 86–84 win. The Cavs regained homecourt advantage as they evened up the series at 2–2. James led the team with 25 points (10/30 shooting) while Rose led the Bulls with 31 points on 11/23 shooting.

This game was particularly controversial due to a timeout that wasn't called late in the game. After Rose made the layup to tie the game at 84–84, Cavaliers head coach, David Blatt, attempted to call timeout. However, the Cavs were out of timeouts. Calling a timeout without having one would have resulted in a technical foul and possession of the ball would go to the Bulls. Tyron Lue held back Blatt and prevented him from getting that timeout. None of the officials noticed Blatt signaling timeout as James ran up the court for what would eventually lead to his game winning buzzer beater.

Following the game, the NBA officiating report revealed that Blatt should have been charged with a timeout that would have drawn a technical and Cavs turnover.

TNT

May 12
7:00 p.m.

Boxscore

Chicago Bulls 101, Cleveland Cavaliers 106
Scoring by quarter: 24–25, 20–29, 27–26, 30–26
Pts: Jimmy Butler 29; Rebs: three players 9 each Asts: Derrick Rose 7	Pts: LeBron James 38; Rebs: LeBron James 12; Asts: LeBron James 6
Cleveland leads series, 3–2

Quicken Loans Arena, Cleveland, Ohio
Attendance: 20,562
Referees: Joe Crawford, Derrick Stafford, Zach Zarba

The Bulls scored the first 8 points of the contest and led 18–8 early in the first quarter. However, the Cavs closed the first quarter on a 17–6 run to take a 25–24 lead into the 2nd quarter. The Cavs' momentum carried over into the 2nd quarter as they built a 54–44 halftime lead. James, who had struggled mightily with his shooting throughout the series, scored 24 points on 10/12 shooting in the first half. The Cavaliers controlled the third quarter and led by 9 after three quarters. Early in the 4th quarter, Dellavedova fell down, and Gibson's legs got tangled up with his. Gibson, attempting to break free, kicked Dellavedova. Gibson was charged with a flagrant 2 and ejected. The Cavs went up by as many as 17 points in the 4th quarter and led 97–82 with just over 6 minutes to play. However, the Bulls would rally, going on a 17–4 run to make it 101–99 Cavs with just over one minute to play. Trailing by 2, Butler attempted a three that would have given the Bulls to lead. However, he missed. James ran the clock down and missed a shot on the Cavs' next possession. However, Shumpert grabbed the offensive rebound. With 20 seconds remaining, and trailing by 2, the Bulls were forced to foul. However, the Cavs made their free throws and closed the game out, winning 106–101 and taking a 3–2 series lead. James led the Cavaliers with 38 points and 12 rebounds to go along with 6 assists and 0 turnovers. Butler led the Bulls with 29 points. Rose scored 12 points in the first quarter on 5/9 shooting. He had only 5 points on 2/15 shooting in the final three quarters, including 0 made baskets in the second half.

ESPN

May 14
8:00 p.m.

Boxscore

Cleveland Cavaliers 94, Chicago Bulls 73
Scoring by quarter: 33–31, 25–13, 15–16, 21–13
Pts: Matthew Dellavedova 19; Rebs: Tristan Thompson 17; Asts: LeBron James 11	Pts: Jimmy Butler 20; Rebs: Joakim Noah 11; Asts: Derrick Rose 6
Cleveland wins series, 4–2

United Center, Chicago
Attendance: 22,695
Referees: Danny Crawford, Marc Davis, Sean Wright

After three consecutive contests came down to the final minute, the Cavaliers finally finished off the Bulls, eliminating them 94–73 at the United Center to win the series 4–2. The Bulls led 40–38 halfway through the second quarter. However, the Cavs closed the half on a 20–4 run, leading by 14 at halftime. The Cavs never relinquished control, leading by double digits for the entire second half and going up by as many as 27 points in the 4th quarter. Irving was forced out of the game after suffering an injury in the second quarter. However, Dellavedova led the way, scoring a playoff career high and season high 19 points to lead the Cavaliers. James had 15–9–11, one rebound shy of a triple double. Butler led the Bulls with 20 points. The Bulls scored 31 points in the 1st quarter. However, they were held to 42 points in the final three quarters, including 29 in the second half.

It was the 4th time in the last 6 seasons that the Bulls were eliminated by a team with LeBron James on its roster.

- This was the first time the Bulls had lost to the Cavaliers in the a playoff series. It also remains the Bulls most recent semifinals appearance.
- Game 3 marked the Cavaliers last loss in a semifinals game until 2024 against the Boston Celtics.

Regular-season series
Cleveland won 3–1 in the regular-season series

October 31, 2014

Recap

Cleveland Cavaliers 114, Chicago Bulls 108 (OT)

United Center, Chicago, Illinois

January 19, 2015

Recap

Chicago Bulls 94, Cleveland Cavaliers 108

Quicken Loans Arena, Cleveland, Ohio

February 12, 2015

Recap

Cleveland Cavaliers 98, Chicago Bulls 113

United Center, Chicago, Illinois

April 5, 2015

Recap

Chicago Bulls 94, Cleveland Cavaliers 99

Quicken Loans Arena, Cleveland, Ohio

This was the seventh playoff meeting between these two teams, with the Bulls winning five out of the first six meetings.

Previous playoffs series
Chicago leads 5–1 in all-time playoff series

1988

Chicago Bulls 3, Cleveland Cavaliers 2

1988 Eastern Conference First Round

1989

Cleveland Cavaliers 2, Chicago Bulls 3

1989 Eastern Conference First Round

1992

Chicago Bulls 4, Cleveland Cavaliers 2

1992 Eastern Conference Finals

1993

Chicago Bulls 4, Cleveland Cavaliers 0

1993 Eastern Conference Semifinals

1994

Chicago Bulls 3, Cleveland Cavaliers 0

1994 Eastern Conference First Round

2010

Cleveland Cavaliers 4, Chicago Bulls 1

2010 Eastern Conference First Round

=== Western Conference semifinals ===
==== (1) Golden State Warriors vs. (5) Memphis Grizzlies ====
ABC

May 3
3:30 pm

Boxscore

Memphis Grizzlies 86, Golden State Warriors 101
Scoring by quarter: 25–32, 27–29, 14–22, 20–18
Pts: Marc Gasol 21; Rebs: Gasol, Randolph 9 each Asts: Zach Randolph 5	Pts: Stephen Curry 22; Rebs: Andrew Bogut 6 Asts: Stephen Curry 7
Golden State leads series, 1–0

Oracle Arena, Oakland, California
Attendance: 19,596
Referees: Joe Crawford, Tom Washington, Sean Wright

TNT

May 5
10:30 pm

Boxscore

Memphis Grizzlies 97, Golden State Warriors 90
Scoring by quarter: 28–22, 22–17, 23–24, 24–27
Pts: Mike Conley Jr. 22; Rebs: Carter, Randolph 7 each Asts: Zach Randolph 4	Pts: Stephen Curry 19; Rebs: Andrew Bogut 12; Asts: Stephen Curry 6
Series tied, 1–1

Oracle Arena, Oakland, California
Attendance: 19,596
Referees: Scott Foster, Bill Kennedy, Jason Phillips

ABC

May 9
8:00 pm

Boxscore

Golden State Warriors 89, Memphis Grizzlies 99
Scoring by quarter: 20–23, 19–32, 25–24, 25–20
Pts: Stephen Curry 23; Rebs: Bogut, Thompson 8 each Asts: Draymond Green 7	Pts: Zach Randolph 22; Rebs: Marc Gasol 15; Asts: Mike Conley Jr. 5
Memphis leads series, 2–1

FedExForum, Memphis, Tennessee
Attendance: 18,119
Referees: Monty McCutchen, Tony Brown, James Capers

TNT

May 11
9:30 pm

Boxscore

Golden State Warriors 101, Memphis Grizzlies 84
Scoring by quarter: 28–20, 33–24, 21–20, 19–20
Pts: Stephen Curry 33; Rebs: Draymond Green 10; Asts: Stephen Curry 7	Pts: Marc Gasol 22; Rebs: Zach Randolph 11; Asts: Mike Conley Jr. 7
Series tied, 2–2

FedExForum, Memphis, Tennessee
Attendance: 18,119
Referees: Mike Callahan, Tony Brothers, Pat Fraher

TNT

May 13
10:30 p.m.

Boxscore

Memphis Grizzlies 78, Golden State Warriors 98
Scoring by quarter: 25–26, 16–23, 16–25, 21–24
Pts: Marc Gasol 18; Rebs: Marc Gasol 12; Asts: Marc Gasol 6	Pts: Klay Thompson 21; Rebs: Andrew Bogut 9 Asts: Draymond Green 9
Golden State leads series, 3–2

Oracle Arena, Oakland, California
Attendance: 19,596
Referees: Ken Mauer, Ed Malloy, Bill Spooner

ESPN

May 15
9:30 p.m.

Boxscore

Golden State Warriors 108, Memphis Grizzlies 95
Scoring by quarter: 32–19, 26–30, 18–19, 32–27
Pts: Stephen Curry 32; Rebs: Draymond Green 12; Asts: Stephen Curry 10	Pts: Marc Gasol 21; Rebs: Marc Gasol 15; Asts: Mike Conley Jr. 9
Golden State wins series, 4–2

FedExForum, Memphis, Tennessee
Attendance: 18,119
Referees: Joe Crawford, John Goble, Zach Zarba

Regular-season series
Golden State won 2–1 in the regular-season series

December 16, 2014

Recap

Golden State Warriors 98, Memphis Grizzlies 105

FedExForum, Memphis, Tennessee

March 27, 2015

Recap

Golden State Warriors 107, Memphis Grizzlies 84

FedExForum, Memphis, Tennessee

April 13, 2015

Recap

Memphis Grizzlies 107, Golden State Warriors 111

Oracle Arena, Oakland, California

This was the first meeting in the playoffs between the Warriors and Grizzlies.

==== (2) Houston Rockets vs. (3) Los Angeles Clippers ====
TNT

May 4
9:30 pm

Boxscore

Los Angeles Clippers 117, Houston Rockets 101
Scoring by quarter: 19–25, 27–25, 37–27, 34–24
Pts: Blake Griffin 26; Rebs: Blake Griffin 14; Asts: Blake Griffin 13	Pts: Dwight Howard 22; Rebs: Dwight Howard 10; Asts: James Harden 12
LA Clippers lead series, 1–0

Toyota Center, Houston, Texas
Attendance: 18,231
Referees: Mike Callahan, Bill Spooner, Derrick Stafford

TNT

May 6
9:30 pm

Boxscore

Los Angeles Clippers 109, Houston Rockets 115
Scoring by quarter: 24–35, 41–21, 20–27, 24–32
Pts: Blake Griffin 34; Rebs: Blake Griffin 15; Asts: Barnes, Crawford 5 each	Pts: James Harden 32; Rebs: Dwight Howard 16; Asts: James Harden 7
Series tied, 1–1

Toyota Center, Houston, Texas
Attendance: 18,310
Referees: Joe Crawford, David Jones, Zach Zarba

ESPN

May 8
10:30 pm

Boxscore

Houston Rockets 99, Los Angeles Clippers 124
Scoring by quarter: 24–33, 33–31, 19–35, 23–25
Pts: James Harden 25; Rebs: Dwight Howard 14; Asts: James Harden 11	Pts: JJ Redick 31; Rebs: DeAndre Jordan 15; Asts: Chris Paul 7
LA Clippers lead series, 2–1

Staples Center, Los Angeles
Attendance: 19,367
Referees: Ken Mauer, John Goble, David Guthrie

TNT

May 10
8:30 pm

Boxscore

Houston Rockets 95, Los Angeles Clippers 128
Scoring by quarter: 33–30, 21–30, 25–43, 16–25
Pts: James Harden 21; Rebs: Ariza, Harden 8 each Asts: James Harden 6	Pts: DeAndre Jordan 26; Rebs: DeAndre Jordan 17; Asts: Chris Paul 12
LA Clippers lead series, 3–1

Staples Center, Los Angeles
Attendance: 19,490
Referees: Danny Crawford, Marc Davis, Ron Garretson

TNT

May 12
9:30 p.m.

Boxscore

Los Angeles Clippers 103, Houston Rockets 124
Scoring by quarter: 22–27, 26–36, 28–27, 27–34
Pts: Blake Griffin 30; Rebs: Blake Griffin 16; Asts: Chris Paul 10	Pts: James Harden 26; Rebs: Dwight Howard 15; Asts: James Harden 10
LA Clippers lead series, 3–2

Toyota Center, Houston, Texas
Attendance: 18,142
Referees: Monty McCutchen, James Capers, Sean Wright

ESPN

May 14
10:30 p.m.

Boxscore

Houston Rockets 119, Los Angeles Clippers 107
Scoring by quarter: 25–29, 37–35, 17–28, 40–15
Pts: James Harden 23; Rebs: Dwight Howard 21; Asts: Jason Terry 5	Pts: Chris Paul 31; Rebs: Matt Barnes 10; Asts: Chris Paul 11
Series tied, 3–3

Staples Center, Los Angeles
Attendance: 19,417
Referees: Scott Foster, Pat Fraher, Jason Phillips

ABC

May 17
3:30 p.m.

Boxscore

Los Angeles Clippers 100, Houston Rockets 113
Scoring by quarter: 21–28, 25–28, 22–29, 32–28
Pts: Blake Griffin 27; Rebs: DeAndre Jordan 17; Asts: Chris Paul 10	Pts: James Harden 31; Rebs: Dwight Howard 15; Asts: James Harden 8
Houston wins series, 4–3

Toyota Center, Houston, Texas
Attendance: 18,463
Referees: Ken Mauer, Tony Brothers, Mike Callahan

The Rockets recovered from a 3–1 deficit for the first time since 1995. Game 6 was one for the books as the Rockets overcome a 19–point deficit, going on an incredible 49–18 run including a 40–15 run in the 4th quarter to end the game. The Clippers missed 14 straight shots as Josh Smith and Corey Brewer dominated much of the 4th quarter combining for 29 points. The 4th quarter spark led Houston to a decisive Game 7, and they completed one of the greatest comebacks in NBA playoff history. This was the ninth time in NBA history a team has come back from a 3–1 deficit to win a series.

The Clippers would ultimately suffer the same fate in 2020, in which they relinquished a 19-point lead in Game 6, and eventually blew a 3–1 series lead to the lower-seeded Denver Nuggets.

Regular-season series
Tied 2–2 in the regular-season series

November 28, 2014

Recap

Los Angeles Clippers 102, Houston Rockets 85

Toyota Center, Houston, Texas

February 11, 2015

Recap

Houston Rockets 95, Los Angeles Clippers 110

Staples Center, Los Angeles

February 25, 2015

Recap

Los Angeles Clippers 105, Houston Rockets 110

Toyota Center, Houston, Texas

March 15, 2015

Recap

Houston Rockets 100, Los Angeles Clippers 98

Staples Center, Los Angeles

This was the second playoff meeting between these two teams, with the Rockets winning the only previous meeting.

Previous playoff series
Houston leads 1–0 in all-time playoff series

1993

Houston Rockets 3, Los Angeles Clippers 2

1993 Western Conference First Round

== Conference finals ==
=== Eastern Conference finals ===
==== (1) Atlanta Hawks vs. (2) Cleveland Cavaliers ====
TNT

May 20
8:30 pm

Boxscore

Cleveland Cavaliers 97, Atlanta Hawks 89
Scoring by quarter: 20–26, 31–25, 23–16, 23–22
Pts: LeBron James 31; Rebs: Timofey Mozgov 11; Asts: Irving, James 6 each	Pts: Jeff Teague 27; Rebs: three players 7 each Asts: Schröder, Teague 4 each
Cleveland leads series, 1–0

Philips Arena, Atlanta
Attendance: 18,489
Referees: Scott Foster, Pat Fraher, Jason Phillips

The Cavaliers defeated the Hawks 97–89, stealing homecourt advantage and taking a 1–0 series lead. LeBron led the team with 31 points while J.R. Smith chipped in 28 points, going 8/12 on threes and setting a Cavaliers franchise record for made threes in a playoff game. The game was tied 63–63 in the 3rd quarter. However, the Cavs, led by Smith's hot shooting, went on a 22–4 run (including an 11–0 run to start the fourth quarter) as they went up 85–67 and seized control. The Hawks would attempt to mount a rally, cutting an 18-point deficit down to 4 with under 50 seconds remaining. However, James drove through the lane and made a dunk to put the Cavs up 6. After Paul Millsap missed a three that would have made it a one possession game with 23 seconds remaining, the Cavs made their free throws to close it out.

TNT

May 22
8:30 pm

Boxscore

Cleveland Cavaliers 94, Atlanta Hawks 82
Scoring by quarter: 26–21, 28–28, 30–17, 10–16
Pts: LeBron James 30; Rebs: Tristan Thompson 16; Asts: LeBron James 11	Pts: Dennis Schröder 13; Rebs: Mike Scott 7 Asts: Jeff Teague 6
Cleveland leads series, 2–0

Philips Arena, Atlanta
Attendance: 18,670
Referees: Joe Crawford, Mike Callahan, Bill Spooner

With Irving sitting out due to injury, the Hawks were in a great position to even up the series. However, the Cavaliers blew out the Hawks and took a commanding 2–0 series lead, winning 94–82. The Cavs led 54–49 at halftime. Coming out of halftime, the Cavs seized control, outscoring the Hawks 30–17 in the third quarter, leading by as many as 20 before settling for an 84–66 lead heading into the 4th quarter. The Cavs scored only 10 points in the final period, but the Hawks trailed by double digits for the entire quarter and failed to make a significant run, managing 16 points. LeBron James led the way for the Cavs, scoring 30 points while having 11 assists and 9 rebounds. Dennis Schroder led the Hawks in scoring with 13 points off the bench. It was the first time this season that the Hawks had lost consecutive home games. The game was memorable when Hawks' 3-point specialist Kyle Korver sprained his right ankle after the Cavs' Matthew Dellavedova fell on his right leg while attempting to dive for a loose ball. This injury kept Korver out for the rest of the postseason and would require surgery in the off-season along with an injured elbow that bothered him for most of the season.

TNT

May 24
8:30 pm

Boxscore

Atlanta Hawks 111, Cleveland Cavaliers 114 (OT)
Scoring by quarter: 24–21, 25–27, 27–33, 28–23, Overtime: 7–10
Pts: Jeff Teague 30; Rebs: Millsap, Scott 9 each Asts: Jeff Teague 7	Pts: LeBron James 37; Rebs: LeBron James 18; Asts: LeBron James 13
Cleveland leads series, 3–0

Quicken Loans Arena, Cleveland, Ohio
Attendance: 20,562
Referees: Ken Mauer, Tony Brothers, Ed Malloy

In a pivotal Game 3, LeBron James got off to an awful start, going 0/9 in the first quarter as the Hawks led 24–21. Near the end of the second quarter, Al Horford and Matthew Dellavedova got tangled up on the floor. Horford, who had scored 15 points on 7/10 shooting in the first half, swung his elbow at Dellavedova. He received a Flagrant 2 foul and was ejected. The Hawks led 49–48 at halftime. However, the Cavs would dominate the third quarter again, outscoring the Hawks 33–27 to take a 5-point lead into the 4th quarter. The Cavs led by as many 10 in the 4th quarter, leading 88–78. However, the Hawks, led by Jeff Teague, would go on a 26–12 run, taking a four-point lead with just under 1:45 to play. The Cavs scored the final four points of regulation to tie up the game. The Hawks had the final possession of regulation. However, Teague's potential game winning three missed at the buzzer, and the game went into overtime. With just under one minute to play in overtime, the Hawks trailed 109–108. Teague hit a three pointer over Thompson to put the Hawks up 111–109. On the Cavs' next possession, James attempted a jumper that rimmed out. However, Thompson grabbed the offensive rebound and passed it back to James. James went behind the three point line and shot a three that went down, putting the Cavs back ahead 112–111. Out of the timeout, the Hawks turned it over on their next possession. On the Cavs' next possession, James ran the shot clock down before driving into the paint and making a layup to put the Cavs up 114–111. The Hawks had two chances to tie the game and potentially force a second overtime, but Shelvin Mack missed both game tying three point attempts, sending the Hawks to their third straight loss as the Cavs went up 3–0 in the series. James recorded his 51st career triple-double (12th of the postseason) with 37 points, 18 rebounds, and 13 assists. Teague led the Hawks with 30 points.

TNT

May 26
8:30 pm

Boxscore

Atlanta Hawks 88, Cleveland Cavaliers 118
Scoring by quarter: 20–32, 22–27, 18–26, 28–33
Pts: Jeff Teague 17; Rebs: Paul Millsap 10; Asts: Horford, Millsap 5 each	Pts: LeBron James 23; Rebs: Tristan Thompson 11; Asts: LeBron James 7
Cleveland wins series, 4–0

Quicken Loans Arena, Cleveland, Ohio
Attendance: 20,562
Referees: Danny Crawford, Marc Davis, Derrick Stafford

After missing the last two games against the Hawks, Irving made his return to the lineup. The Cavaliers routed the Hawks by 30 points, dominating from start to finish. The Cavs led 32–20 after the first quarter and never looked back. After leading by 17 at halftime, the Cavs controlled the entire second half. The Cavs led 85–60 heading into the fourth quarter, a quarter where very few starters logged minutes. The Cavaliers went on to win 118–88 as the franchise clinched their second Eastern Conference Championship in franchise history and returned to the Finals for the first time since 2007. The Atlanta Hawks became the first #1 seed to be swept in the Conference Finals since the Nets swept the Pistons in the 2003 Conference Finals. LeBron James and James Jones also became the first non-Celtics to appear in five consecutive NBA Finals series.

Regular-season series
Atlanta won 3–1 in the regular-season series

November 15, 2014

Recap

Atlanta Hawks 94, Cleveland Cavaliers 127

Quicken Loans Arena, Cleveland, Ohio

December 17, 2014

Recap

Atlanta Hawks 127, Cleveland Cavaliers 98

Quicken Loans Arena, Cleveland, Ohio

December 30, 2014

Recap

Cleveland Cavaliers 101, Atlanta Hawks 109

Philips Arena, Atlanta

March 6, 2015

Recap

Cleveland Cavaliers 97, Atlanta Hawks 106

Philips Arena, Atlanta

This was the second playoff meeting between these two teams, with the Cavaliers winning the only prior meeting.

Previous playoff series
Cleveland leads 1–0 in all-time playoff series

2009

Cleveland Cavaliers 4, Atlanta Hawks 0

2009 Eastern Conference Semifinals

=== Western Conference finals ===
==== (1) Golden State Warriors vs. (2) Houston Rockets ====
ESPN

May 19
9:00 pm

Boxscore

Houston Rockets 106, Golden State Warriors 110
Scoring by quarter: 31–24, 24–34, 24–26, 27–26
Pts: James Harden 28; Rebs: Dwight Howard 13; Asts: James Harden 9	Pts: Stephen Curry 34; Rebs: Draymond Green 12; Asts: Draymond Green 8
Golden State leads series, 1–0

Oracle Arena, Oakland, California
Attendance: 19,596
Referees: Danny Crawford, Marc Davis, Sean Wright

ESPN

May 21
9:00 pm

Boxscore

Houston Rockets 98, Golden State Warriors 99
Scoring by quarter: 28–36, 27–19, 20–22, 23–22
Pts: James Harden 38; Rebs: Dwight Howard 17; Asts: James Harden 9	Pts: Stephen Curry 33; Rebs: Bogut, Green 8 each Asts: Draymond Green 7
Golden State leads series, 2–0

Oracle Arena, Oakland, California
Attendance: 19,596
Referees: Monty McCutchen, James Capers, John Goble

ESPN

May 23
9:00 pm

Boxscore

Golden State Warriors 115, Houston Rockets 80
Scoring by quarter: 30–18, 32–19, 30–24, 23–19
Pts: Stephen Curry 40; Rebs: Draymond Green 13; Asts: Stephen Curry 7	Pts: James Harden 17; Rebs: Dwight Howard 14; Asts: Harden, Smith 4 each
Golden State leads series, 3–0

Toyota Center, Houston, Texas
Attendance: 18,282
Referees: Scott Foster, Jason Phillips, Zach Zarba

ESPN

May 25
9:00 pm

Boxscore

Golden State Warriors 115, Houston Rockets 128
Scoring by quarter: 22–45, 37–24, 25–30, 31–29
Pts: Klay Thompson 24; Rebs: Draymond Green 15; Asts: three players 4 each	Pts: James Harden 45; Rebs: Dwight Howard 12; Asts: Harden, Smith 5 each
Golden State leads series, 3–1

Toyota Center, Houston, Texas
Attendance: 18,239
Referees: Joe Crawford, Mike Callahan, Tom Washington

ESPN

May 27
9:00 pm

Boxscore

Houston Rockets 90, Golden State Warriors 104
Scoring by quarter: 22–17, 24–35, 22–22, 22–30
Pts: Dwight Howard 18; Rebs: Dwight Howard 16; Asts: James Harden 5	Pts: Stephen Curry 26; Rebs: Andrew Bogut 14; Asts: Curry, Iguodala 6
Golden State wins series, 4–1

Oracle Arena, Oakland, California
Attendance: 19,596
Referees: Ken Mauer, Tony Brothers, Ed Malloy

In Game 5, James Harden set an NBA playoff record for turnovers, with 12. The record was previously held by John Williamson of the New Jersey Nets with 11 in 1979.

Regular-season series
Golden State won 4–0 in the regular-season series

November 8, 2014

Recap

Golden State Warriors 98, Houston Rockets 87

Toyota Center, Houston, Texas

December 10, 2014

Recap

Houston Rockets 93, Golden State Warriors 105

Oracle Arena, Oakland, California

January 17, 2015

Recap

Golden State Warriors 131, Houston Rockets 106

Toyota Center, Houston, Texas

January 21, 2015

Recap

Houston Rockets 113, Golden State Warriors 126

Oracle Arena, Oakland, California

This was the first playoff meeting between the Warriors and the Rockets.

== NBA Finals: (W1) Golden State Warriors vs. (E2) Cleveland Cavaliers ==
ABC

June 4
9:00 pm

Boxscore

Cleveland Cavaliers 100, Golden State Warriors 108 (OT)
Scoring by quarter: 29–19, 22–29, 22–25, 25–25, Overtime: 2–10
Pts: LeBron James 44; Rebs: Tristan Thompson 15; Asts: Irving, James 6 each	Pts: Stephen Curry 26; Rebs: Andrew Bogut 7 Asts: Stephen Curry 8
Golden State leads series, 1–0

Oracle Arena, Oakland, California
Attendance: 19,596
Referees: Monty McCutchen, James Capers, Jason Phillips

ABC

June 7
8:00 pm

Boxscore

Cleveland Cavaliers 95, Golden State Warriors 93 (OT)
Scoring by quarter: 20–20, 27–25, 15–14, 25–28, Overtime: 8–6
Pts: LeBron James 39; Rebs: LeBron James 16; Asts: LeBron James 11	Pts: Klay Thompson 34; Rebs: Green, Bogut 10 each Asts: Curry, Iguodala 5 each
Series tied, 1–1

Oracle Arena, Oakland, California
Attendance: 19,596
Referees: Scott Foster, Tony Brothers, Zach Zarba

ABC

June 9
9:00 pm

Boxscore

Golden State Warriors 91, Cleveland Cavaliers 96
Scoring by quarter: 20–24, 17–20, 18–28, 36–24
Pts: Stephen Curry 27; Rebs: Ezeli, Green 7 each Asts: Stephen Curry 6	Pts: LeBron James 40; Rebs: Tristan Thompson 13; Asts: LeBron James 8
Cleveland leads series, 2–1

Quicken Loans Arena, Cleveland, Ohio
Attendance: 20,562
Referees: Danny Crawford, Marc Davis, Derrick Stafford

ABC

June 11
9:00 pm

Boxscore

Golden State Warriors 103, Cleveland Cavaliers 82
Scoring by quarter: 31–24, 23–18, 22–28, 27–12
Pts: Curry, Iguodala 22 each Rebs: three players 8 each Asts: Curry, Green 6 each	Pts: Timofey Mozgov 28; Rebs: Tristan Thompson 13; Asts: LeBron James 8
Series tied, 2–2

Quicken Loans Arena, Cleveland, Ohio
Attendance: 20,562
Referees: Joe Crawford, Mike Callahan, Ken Mauer

ABC

June 14
8:00 pm

Boxscore

Cleveland Cavaliers 91, Golden State Warriors 104
Scoring by quarter: 22–22, 28–29, 17–22, 24–31
Pts: LeBron James 40; Rebs: LeBron James 14; Asts: LeBron James 11	Pts: Stephen Curry 37; Rebs: Harrison Barnes 10; Asts: Andre Iguodala 7
Golden State leads series, 3–2

Oracle Arena, Oakland, California
Attendance: 19,596
Referees: Monty McCutchen, James Capers, Jason Phillips

ABC

June 16
9:00 pm

Boxscore

Golden State Warriors 105, Cleveland Cavaliers 97
Scoring by quarter: 28–15, 17–28, 28–18, 32–36
Pts: Curry, Iguodala 25 each Rebs: Draymond Green 11; Asts: Draymond Green 10	Pts: LeBron James 32; Rebs: LeBron James 18; Asts: LeBron James 9
Golden State wins series, 4–2

Quicken Loans Arena, Cleveland, Ohio
Attendance: 20,562
Referees: Scott Foster, Marc Davis, Zach Zarba

Regular-season series
Tied 1–1 in the regular-season series

January 9, 2015

Recap

Cleveland Cavaliers 94, Golden State Warriors 112

Oracle Arena, Oakland, California

February 26, 2015

Recap

Golden State Warriors 99, Cleveland Cavaliers 110

Quicken Loans Arena, Cleveland, Ohio

This was the first meeting in the NBA Finals between the Warriors and Cavaliers.

== Statistical leaders ==
Category	High			Average			
Category	Player	Team	High	Player	Team	Avg.	Games played
Points	James Harden	Houston Rockets	45	Anthony Davis	New Orleans Pelicans	31.5	4
Rebounds	Dwight Howard	Houston Rockets	26	Dwight Howard	Houston Rockets	14.0	17
Assists	John Wall	Washington Wizards	17	John Wall	Washington Wizards	11.9	7
Steals	Kyle Korver; Stephen Curry; Jamal Crawford; Zaza Pachulia	Atlanta Hawks; Golden State Warriors; Los Angeles Clippers; Milwaukee Bucks	6	Jimmy Butler	Chicago Bulls	2.4	12
Blocks	Timofey Mozgov; Dwight Howard; Al Horford; Danny Green; Marc Gasol; Andrew Bogut; Draymond Green	Cleveland Cavaliers; Houston Rockets; Atlanta Hawks; San Antonio Spurs; Memphis Grizzlies; Golden State Warriors; Golden State Warriors	5	Anthony Davis	New Orleans Pelicans	3.0	4

== Media coverage ==
=== Television ===
ESPN, TNT, ABC, ESPN2 and NBA TV broadcast the NBA Playoffs nationally. In the first round the regional sports networks affiliated with the teams can also broadcast the games. Throughout the first two rounds, TNT televises games Saturday through Thursday, ESPN televises games on Friday and Sunday, and ABC televises select games on Saturday and Sunday, usually in the afternoon. NBA TV and ESPN2 televises select games in the first round. TNT televises the Eastern Conference Finals and ESPN the Western Conference Finals. ABC televises the NBA Finals for the 13th consecutive year.

=== Radio ===
ESPN Radio has exclusive national radio rights to broadcast the playoffs in the United States. They broadcast mostly ABC games during the first two rounds, all of the conference finals, and the NBA Finals.
