= NBA Player of the Month and Week =

Recurring American basketball awards

- Sport: Basketball
- League: National Basketball Association
- Awarded for: Best performing Player of the Month and Week for the Eastern Conference and Western Conference

History
- First award: 1979–80
- First winner: Moses Malone (Player of the Month); Julius Erving (Player of the Week)
- Most wins: LeBron James (Player of the Month) (41 times); LeBron James (Player of the Week) (70 times)

The NBA Player of the Month (POTM) and NBA Player of the Week (POTW) are regular awards given by the National Basketball Association (NBA) to recognize outstanding performances by players during the regular season. These honors are presented based on individual and team performances.

== History ==
The NBA began awarding the Player of the Month and Player of the Week distinctions during the 1979–80 season. The Player of the Month was first awarded to Moses Malone in November 1979 and Player of the Week to Julius Erving in October 1979. Initially, only one player in the entire league was awarded each week, but since the 2001–02 season, at least two players are selected, one from the Eastern Conference and another from the Western Conference. On rare occasions, the award has been shared by two or more players. One instance occurred in January 2015, when the Atlanta Hawks starting five (Al Horford, Kyle Korver, Jeff Teague, DeMarre Carroll and Paul Millsap) were named co-recipients of the Player of the Month award for leading the team to a 17–0 record.

== Criteria ==
Both awards are determined by evaluating players' statistical achievements and their teams' success during the relevant period. For the Player of the Week award, performances in a seven-day span are considered, while the Player of the Month award is based on performances over an entire calendar month.

== Notable records ==
LeBron James holds the record for the most Player of the Month and Player of the Week awards with 41 and 70 respectively as of April 2026. He is the oldest player to win either award.

*	Denotes players inducted to the Naismith Memorial Basketball Hall of Fame
^	Denotes players who are still active in the NBA

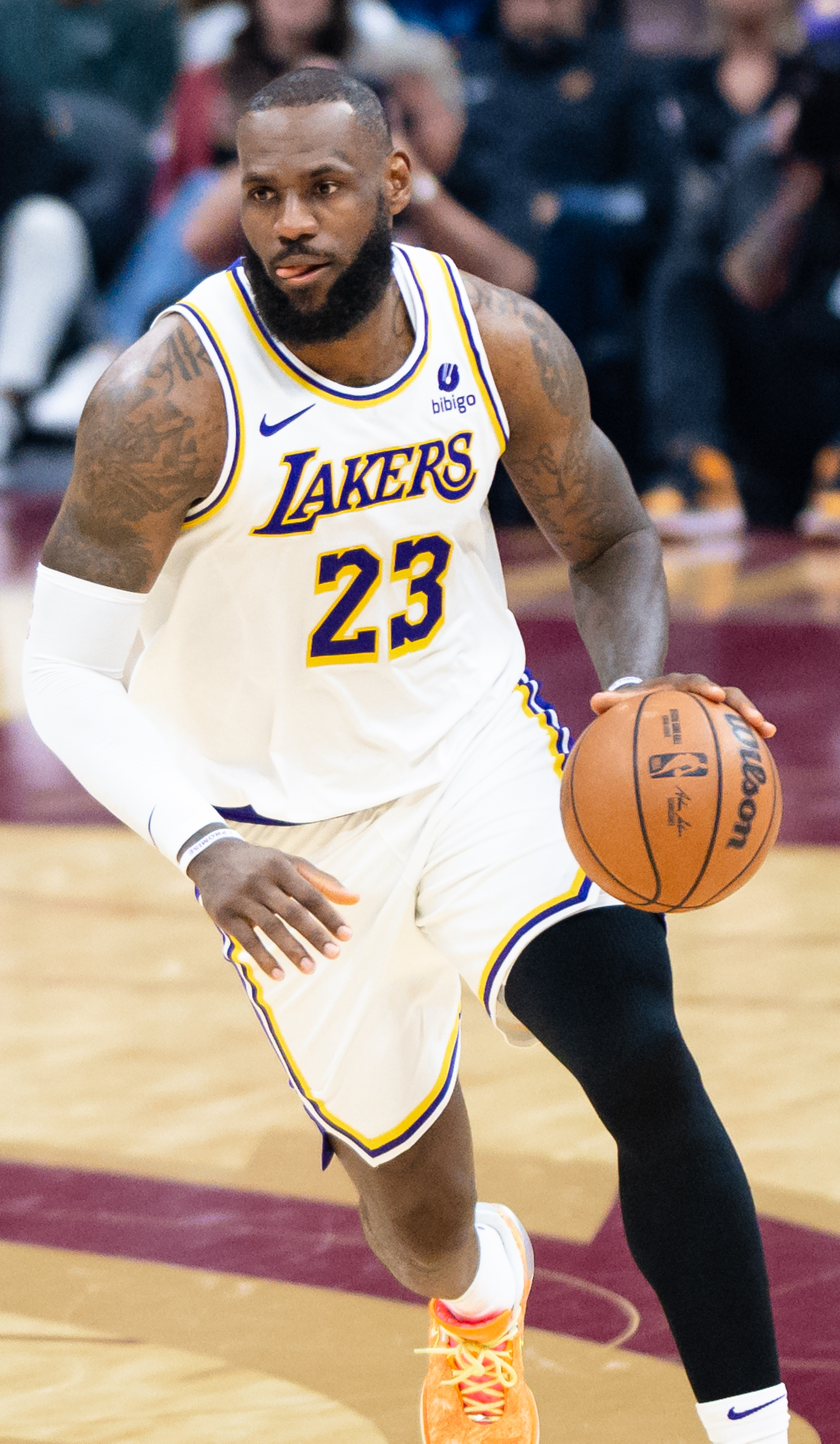
LeBron James has won the most Player of the Month and Week awards in NBA history.

Statistics accurate as of the 2025–26 NBA season.

Most NBA Player of the Week awards (minimum 10)
Player	Awards	Seasons
LeBron James^	70	From 2005 to 2026
Kobe Bryant*	33	From 2000 to 2013
Kevin Durant^	33	From 2010 to 2025
Giannis Antetokounmpo^	28	From 2015 to 2025
James Harden^	27	From 2013 to 2025
Michael Jordan*	25	From 1985 to 2003
Tim Duncan*	23	From 1998 to 2015
Allen Iverson*	23	From 1997 to 2008
Karl Malone*	23	From 1987 to 2002
Stephen Curry^	20	From 2015 to 2024
Kevin Garnett*	20	From 1999 to 2012
Shaquille O'Neal*	20	From 1993 to 2005
Russell Westbrook^	20	From 2010 to 2021
Nikola Jokić^	20	From 2018 to 2026
Carmelo Anthony*	19	From 2004 to 2020
Dwyane Wade*	19	From 2004 to 2016
Dwight Howard*	18	From 2007 to 2012
Magic Johnson*	18	From 1980 to 1991
Luka Dončić^	18	From 2020 to 2026
Jason Kidd*	17	From 1995 to 2009
Paul Pierce*	17	From 2001 to 2012
Damian Lillard^	16	From 2015 to 2023
Dirk Nowitzki*	16	From 2002 to 2014
Larry Bird*	15	From 1980 to 1988
David Robinson*	15	From 1990 to 1998
DeMar DeRozan^	15	From 2016 to 2024
Joel Embiid^	14	From 2017 to 2024
Chris Paul^	14	From 2006 to 2022
Jayson Tatum^	13	From 2020 to 2026
Patrick Ewing*	12	From 1986 to 1997
Tracy McGrady*	12	From 2002 to 2008
Hakeem Olajuwon*	12	From 1989 to 1997
Charles Barkley*	11	From 1986 to 1997
Vince Carter*	11	From 1999 to 2007
Clyde Drexler*	11	From 1986 to 1995
Paul George^	11	From 2013 to 2023
Anthony Davis^	11	From 2015 to 2024
Kawhi Leonard^	11	From 2015 to 2025
Devin Booker^	10	From 2021 to 2024
LaMarcus Aldridge	10	From 2011 to 2018

Most NBA Player of the Month awards (minimum 5)
Player	Awards	Seasons
LeBron James^	41	From 2005 to 2025
Kobe Bryant*	17	From 2001 to 2013
Michael Jordan*	16	From 1987 to 1998
Kevin Durant^	15	From 2010 to 2022
Shaquille O'Neal*	12	From 1994 to 2005
James Harden^	11	From 2015 to 2021
Giannis Antetokounmpo^	11	From 2017 to 2025
Stephen Curry^	10	From 2013 to 2022
Russell Westbrook^	9	From 2015 to 2021
Kevin Garnett*	9	From 2000 to 2005
Nikola Jokić^	9	From 2021 to 2025
Chris Paul^	8	From 2008 to 2017
Larry Bird*	7	From 1980 to 1986
Joel Embiid^	7	From 2019 to 2023
Karl Malone*	7	From 1988 to 2001
Luka Dončić^	7	From 2019 to 2026
Dwight Howard	6	From 2006 to 2011
Magic Johnson*	6	From 1981 to 1990
Dirk Nowitzki*	6	From 2003 to 2009
Hakeem Olajuwon*	6	From 1986 to 1995
Dwyane Wade*	6	From 2005 to 2011
Carmelo Anthony	6	From 2006 to 2014
Jayson Tatum^	5	From 2020 to 2024
Patrick Ewing*	5	From 1989 to 1995
Shai-Gilgeous Alexander^	5	From 2023 to 2025

== See also ==
- List of NBA awards
- NBA Rookie of the Month Award
