= Jeff Teague =

American basketball player (born 1988)

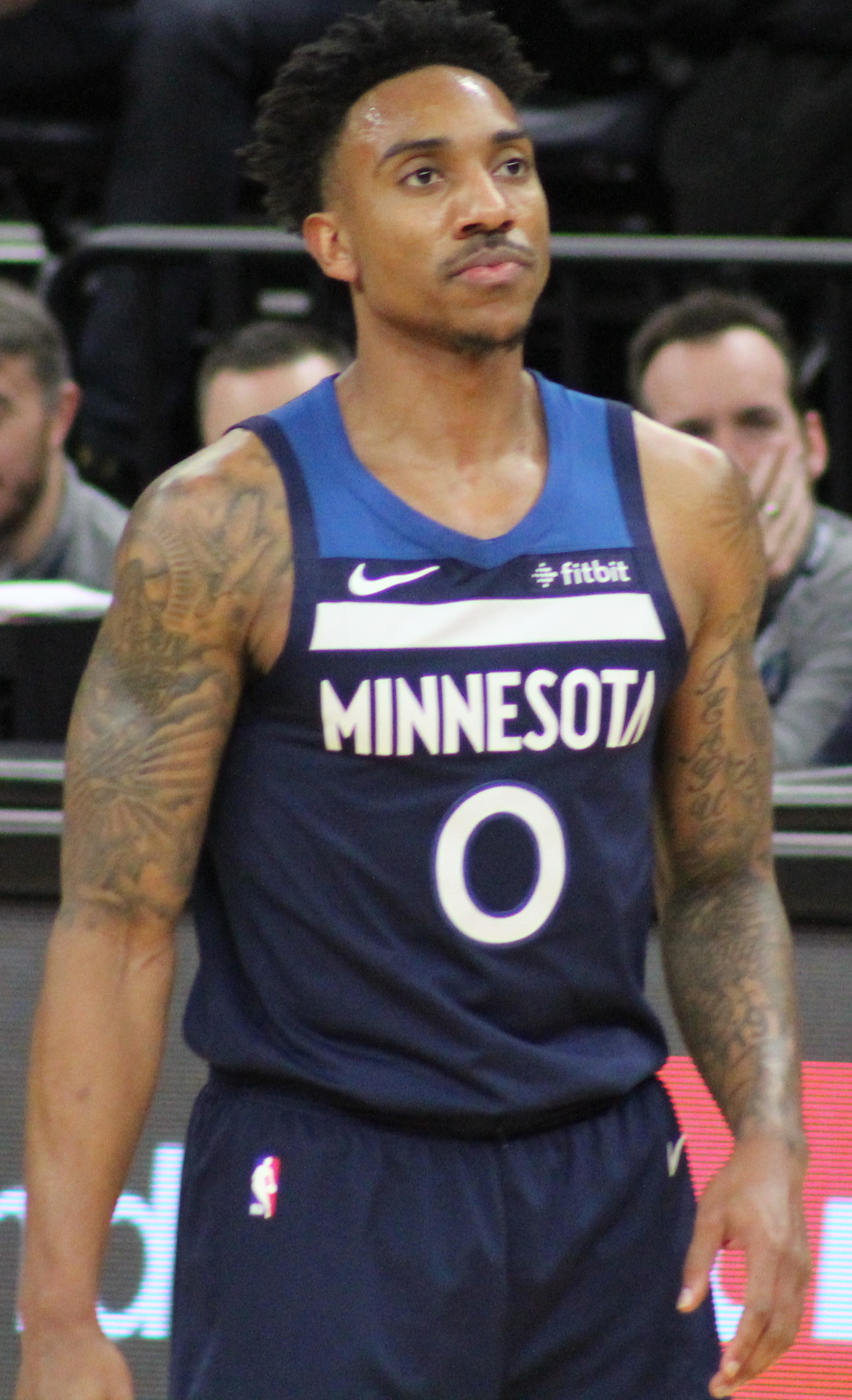
- Teague with the Minnesota Timberwolves in 2019

Personal information
- Born: June 10, 1988 (age 38) Indianapolis, Indiana, U.S.
- Listed height: 6 ft 1 in (1.85 m)
- Listed weight: 195 lb (88 kg)

Career information
- High school: Pike (Indianapolis, Indiana)
- College: Wake Forest (2007–2009)
- NBA draft: 2009: 1st round, 19th overall pick
- Drafted by: Atlanta Hawks
- Playing career: 2009–2021
- Position: Point guard
- Number: 0, 44, 00, 55, 5
- Coaching career: 2023–present

Career history

Playing
- 2009–2016: Atlanta Hawks
- 2016–2017: Indiana Pacers
- 2017–2020: Minnesota Timberwolves
- 2020: Atlanta Hawks
- 2020–2021: Boston Celtics
- 2021: Milwaukee Bucks

Coaching
- 2023–present: Pike High School

Career highlights
- NBA champion (2021); NBA All-Star (2015); Consensus second-team All-American (2009); Second-team All-ACC (2009); ACC All-Freshman Team (2008)

Career statistics
- Points: 10,061 (12.2 ppg)
- Rebounds: 1,989 (2.4 rpg)
- Assists: 4,585 (5.6 apg)
- Stats at NBA.com
- Stats at Basketball Reference

Jeffrey Demarco Teague (born June 10, 1988) is an American former professional basketball player, who is the head coach for Pike High School in Indianapolis, Indiana. He played in the National Basketball Association (NBA) for five teams between 2009 and 2021, including seven seasons with the Atlanta Hawks. Since retiring in 2021, he has worked as regional scout for the Hawks. Teague played college basketball for the Wake Forest Demon Deacons before being selected 19th overall in the 2009 NBA draft by the Hawks. He made an appearance as an NBA All-Star in 2015 and won an NBA championship in 2021 with the Milwaukee Bucks.

== Early life ==
Teague attended Pike High School in Indianapolis, Indiana where as a senior in 2006–07, he averaged 22 points and four assists per game. Considered a four-star recruit by Rivals.com, Teague was listed as the No. 9-point guard and the No. 57 player in the nation in 2007.

== College career ==
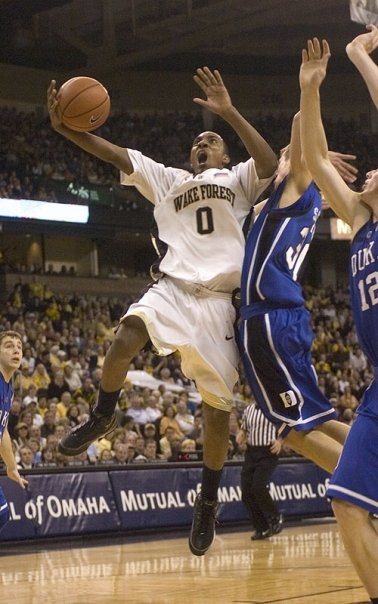
Teague as a college player, 2009

Teague played college basketball for the Wake Forest Demon Deacons. As a freshman in 2007–08, Teague was second on the team in scoring, scoring 13.9 points per game, just behind fellow freshman James Johnson's 14.6. As a sophomore in 2008–09, Teague became the first Wake Forest All-American since Chris Paul in 2004–05, and the 13th in school history. He was selected as a finalist for the Bob Cousy Award, the John Wooden Award and the Oscar Robertson Trophy. He led Wake Forest in scoring with 18.8 points per game, in passing with 3.5 assists per game, in steals with 1.9 per game, and in three-point percentage at 48.5%. He scored his 1,000th point with the Demon Deacons and became the 45th player in the history of the school to join the club. He scored a career-high 34 points on January 11, 2009, in a 92–89 victory over North Carolina. On April 8, 2009, Teague declared for the NBA draft, forgoing his final two years of college eligibility.

== Professional career ==
=== Atlanta Hawks (2009–2016) ===
==== Early years (2009–2011) ====
Teague was selected with the 19th overall pick by the Atlanta Hawks in the 2009 NBA draft. On July 20, 2009, he signed his rookie scale contract with the Hawks. As a rookie in 2009–10, he averaged 3.2 points, 1.7 assists and 0.9 rebounds in 10.1 minutes (.396 FG%, .837 FT%), playing in 71 games (three starts) and ranking tenth among rookies in assists. He finished the regular season in style, setting then career highs in several categories with a 24-point, 15-assist, five-rebound effort against the Cleveland Cavaliers on April 14, hitting 11-of-19 from the field and playing all 48 minutes. He went on to play sparingly in the team's playoff run, a run that saw the Hawks lose to the Orlando Magic in the Conference semi-finals.

In 2010–11, the second-year guard averaged 5.2 points, 2.0 assists and 1.5 rebounds in 13.8 minutes (.438 FG%, .375 3FG%, .794 FT%). He scored in double-figures 12 times, including three 20-point efforts. He led the team in assists four times and scoring on three occasions. On March 12, 2011, he tied his career high of 24 points in a 91–82 win over the Portland Trail Blazers. During the Hawks' 2011 first-round playoff match-up with the Orlando Magic, Teague played under 10 minutes in just two games, as the Hawks won 4–2. He was moved into the starting spot for the team's second-round match-up with the Chicago Bulls following an injury to starter Kirk Hinrich. Teague started all six games against the Bulls, a series the Hawks lost 4–2. Teague averaged 14.8 points and 4.2 assists in 38.1 minutes in his six playoff starts, well above his regular season averages.

==== Breakout seasons (2011–2014) ====
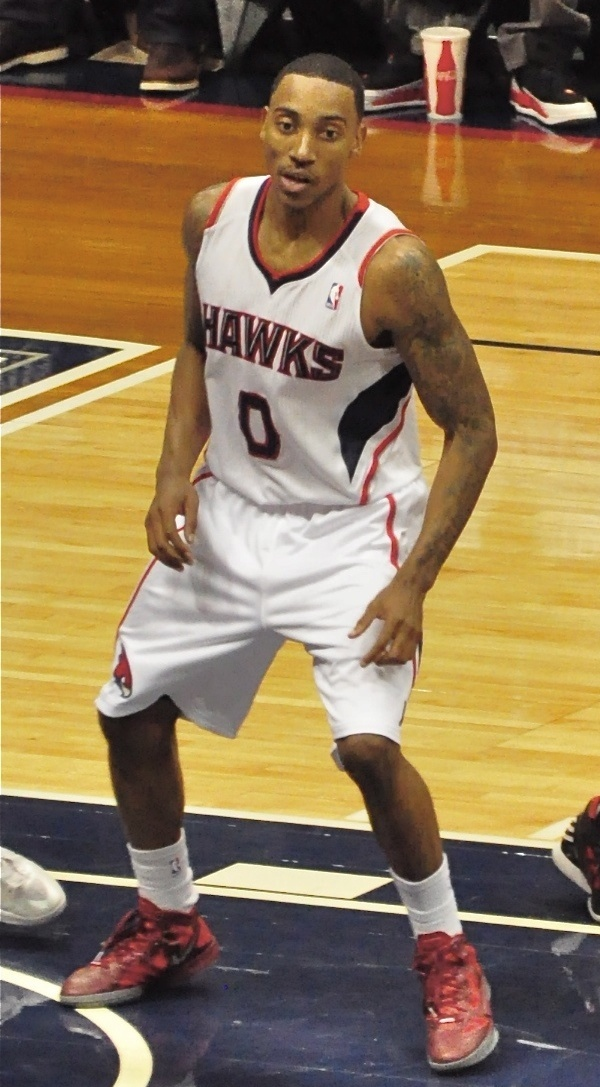
Teague with the Hawks in January 2012

Teague in 2011–12, started all 66 games, averaging 12.6 points, 4.9 assists, 2.4 rebounds and 1.6 steals in 33.1 minutes (.476 FG%, .342 3FG%, .757 FT%). He ranked eighth in the NBA in steals (106), 10th in steals per game, 20th in steal-to-turnover ratio (0.79), 22nd in assists (321), 23rd in assists per game, and 40th in FG%. He had ten 20-point efforts and three double-doubles during the regular season, in addition to four double-digit scoring games during the Hawks' 4–2 first-round playoff loss to the Boston Celtics.

In 2012–13, Teague recorded career highs of 14.6 points and 7.2 assists, along with 2.3 rebounds and 1.5 steals in 32.9 minutes (.451 FG%, .359 3FG%, .881 FT%), appearing in a team-high 80 games (78 starts). He recorded ten 20-point/10-assist games in 2012–13, the eighth-highest total in a single season in franchise history (Pete Maravich – 12 in 1972–73, Trae Young in 2019-2020 - 16, 2021-2022 - 20, 2022-2023 - 11, 2023-2024 - 15,2024-2025 - 22, and Eddie Johnson – 11 in 1984–85). On January 16, 2013, he scored a career-high 28 points in a 109–95 win over the Brooklyn Nets. Teague later participated in the Taco Bell Skills Challenge during NBA All-Star Weekend. The Hawks were once again knocked out in the first round of the playoffs, losing 4–2 to the Indiana Pacers.

On July 10, 2013, Teague was extended a four-year, $32 million offer sheet by the Milwaukee Bucks; however, three days later, the Hawks matched the offer. On December 26, 2013, he scored a career-high 34 points in a 127–125 double overtime win over the Cleveland Cavaliers. On March 18, 2014, he tied that mark with 34 points in a 118–113 overtime win over the Toronto Raptors. On April 14, he was named Eastern Conference Player of the Week for games played Monday, April 7, through Sunday, April 13. He earned his first Player of the Week honor after averaging 20.3 points, 5.8 assists, 2.0 rebounds and 1.8 steals in 33.8 minutes per game (.509 FG%, .917 FT%) in four games, in a week that the Hawks went 3–1. The Hawks finished the 2013–14 season as the eighth seed in the East, eventually losing in the first round of the playoffs to the Indiana Pacers in seven games. Teague scored in double-figures in all seven games, including three 20-point nights, and had one double-double. He scored a playoff career-high 29 points on May 1, and notched his first career postseason double-double with 22 points and playoff career-high 10 assists on April 24.

==== First All-Star selection and final Atlanta years (2014–2016) ====
On January 29, 2015, Teague earned his first All-Star selection as a reserve for the Eastern Conference in the 2015 NBA All-Star Game. Teague went on to lead the Hawks to a first-place finish in the East. In the first round against the eighth-seeded Brooklyn Nets, Teague averaged 14.2 points and 7.8 assists per game. In game 6, Teague tallied 13 assists without a single point, helping the Hawks close out the series with a dominating 114–87 win. In the Conference semi-finals against the Washington Wizards, Teague averaged 16.3 points and 7.0 assists per game. In game 4, Teague recorded 26 points and 8 assists, scoring 10 points in the fourth quarter and hitting a clutch three-pointer in the final minutes, sealing a 106–101 win over the Wizards and tying the series at 2–2. In game 6, he recorded 20 points and 7 assists, while assisting DeMarre Carroll on two consecutive possessions in the final minute, giving the Hawks a four-point lead. They went on to win 94–91 after a potential tying three-pointer by Paul Pierce was waved off, clinching the series 4–2. They eventually lost to the Cleveland Cavaliers in the Eastern Conference Finals.

Early on in 2015–16, Teague began to compete for minutes with back-up point guard Dennis Schröder as his role started to diminish largely due to Schröder's improved play and Teague's drop off in production. Midway through the season, Teague began drawing interest from opposing teams, with the Hawks reportedly talking with other teams about potential trades involving Teague. On February 1, 2016, Teague scored a season-high 32 points and hit a career-high five three-pointers in a 112–97 win over the Dallas Mavericks. Teague helped the Hawks reach the Eastern Conference semi-finals, where they were swept by the Cleveland Cavaliers.

=== Indiana Pacers (2016–2017) ===
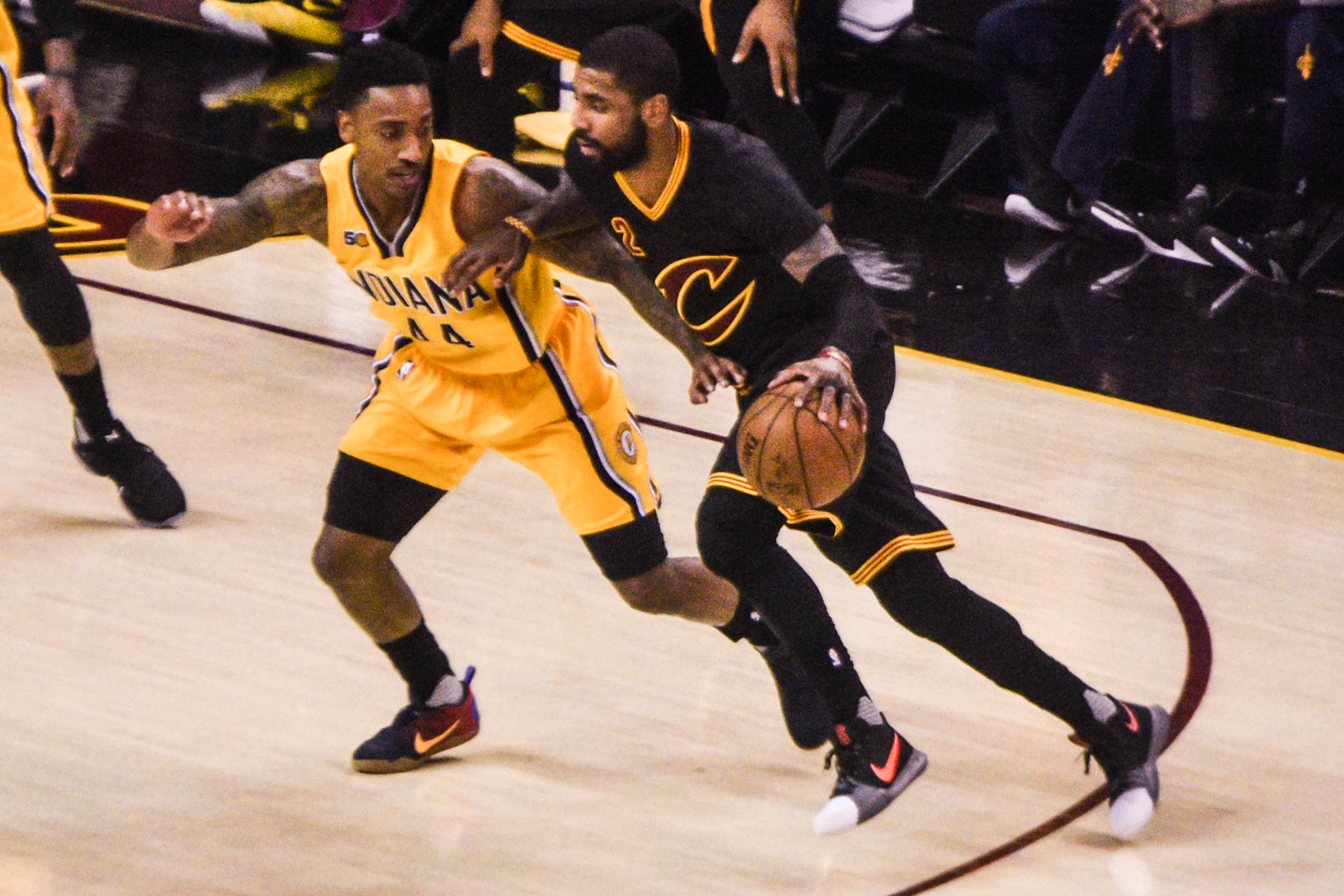
Teague (left) with the Pacers in February 2017, guarding Kyrie Irving.

On July 7, 2016, Teague was traded to his hometown team, the Indiana Pacers, in a three-team deal involving the Hawks and the Utah Jazz. He made his debut for the Pacers in their season opener on October 26, 2016, recording 20 points and eight assists in a 130–121 overtime win over the Dallas Mavericks. On November 9, he scored a season-high 30 points in a 122–115 overtime win over the Philadelphia 76ers. He tied that mark on November 20, recording 30 points, nine assists and six steals in a 115–111 overtime win over the Oklahoma City Thunder. On December 30, he recorded a career-high 17 assists in a 111–101 win over the Chicago Bulls. In 2016–17, Teague became the first Pacers player to start 82 games since Mike Dunleavy Jr. in 2007–08.

=== Minnesota Timberwolves (2017–2020) ===
On July 10, 2017, Teague signed a three-year, $57 million contract with the Minnesota Timberwolves. On December 27, 2017, in a game against the Denver Nuggets, Teague suffered a Grade 1 MCL sprain in his left knee and was subsequently ruled out for two-to-four weeks. He returned to action on January 10 against the Oklahoma City Thunder after missing seven games. Starting 70 games, Teague helped Minnesota clinch their first winning season and playoff berth since 2004.

Teague missed six games early in the 2018–19 season with a bruised left knee. On December 5, he had a season-high 18 assists in a 121–104 win over the Charlotte Hornets. He missed nine games due to left ankle inflammation between mid-December and early January. The left foot injury kept him out for a further eight games between late January and early February. On March 21, he was ruled out for the rest of the season after reaggravating a left foot injury, originally suffered in December. On April 11, it was reported that the surgery Teague underwent for his left ankle was a success.

=== Return to Atlanta (2020) ===
On January 16, 2020, Teague, along with Treveon Graham, was traded to the Atlanta Hawks in exchange for Allen Crabbe.

=== Boston Celtics (2020–2021) ===
On November 30, 2020, Teague signed with the Boston Celtics.

On March 25, 2021, Teague was traded to the Orlando Magic along with two future second-round draft picks in exchange for Evan Fournier, but was waived two days later.

=== Milwaukee Bucks (2021) ===
On April 1, 2021, Teague signed with the Milwaukee Bucks reuniting with his coach from Atlanta, Mike Budenholzer. Teague played in 21 regular season games for the Bucks averaging 6.6 points 2.8 assists and 1.5 rebounds in 15.9 minutes per game. On July 20, 2021, the Bucks defeated the Phoenix Suns in game 6 of the 2021 NBA Finals, giving Teague his first NBA championship. He played in all six of the NBA Finals games, averaging 1.5 points, 0.8 rebounds and 0.5 steals in 9.3 minutes per game as the Bucks' backup point guard to Jrue Holiday.

== Executive career ==
On March 9, 2022, Teague was hired by the Atlanta Hawks as a regional scout, returning to the franchise that drafted him in 2009 and where he spent his first seven seasons of his career, as well a second stint later in his career.

== Coaching career ==
On April 27, 2023, it was announced Teague would be the new head coach of Pike High School, the same school he graduated from.

== Career statistics ==
Legend
GP	Games played	GS	Games started	MPG	Minutes per game
FG%	Field goal percentage	3P%	3-point field goal percentage	FT%	Free throw percentage
RPG	Rebounds per game	APG	Assists per game	SPG	Steals per game
BPG	Blocks per game	PPG	Points per game	**Bold**	Career high
†	Won an NBA championship	*	Led the league

=== College ===
Year	Team	GP	GS	MPG	FG%	3P%	FT%	RPG	APG	SPG	BPG	PPG
2007–08	Wake Forest	30	21	29.7	.434	.395	.803	2.7	2.5	1.8	.5	13.9
2008–09	Wake Forest	**31**	**31**	**32.0**	**.485**	**.441**	**.817**	**3.3**	**3.5**	**1.9**	**.6**	**18.8**
Career		61	52	30.9	.462	.421	.812	3.0	3.0	1.9	.6	16.4

=== NBA ===
==== Regular season ====
Year	Team	GP	GS	MPG	FG%	3P%	FT%	RPG	APG	SPG	BPG	PPG
2009–10	Atlanta	71	3	10.1	.396	.219	.837	.9	1.7	.5	.2	3.2
2010–11	Atlanta	70	7	13.8	.438	.375	.794	1.5	2.0	.6	.4	5.2
2011–12	Atlanta	66*	66*	**33.1**	**.476**	.342	.757	2.4	4.9	1.6	**.6**	12.6
2012–13	Atlanta	80	78	32.9	.451	.359	.881	2.3	7.2	1.5	.4	14.6
2013–14	Atlanta	79	79	32.2	.438	.329	.846	2.6	6.7	1.1	.2	**16.5**
2014–15	Atlanta	73	72	30.5	.460	.343	.862	2.5	7.0	**1.7**	.4	15.9
2015–16	Atlanta	79	78	28.5	.439	.400	.837	2.7	5.9	1.2	.3	15.7
2016–17	Indiana	**82***	**82***	32.4	.442	.357	.867	**4.0**	7.8	1.2	.4	15.3
2017–18	Minnesota	70	70	33.0	.446	.368	.845	3.0	7.0	1.5	.3	14.2
2018–19	Minnesota	42	41	30.1	.423	.333	.804	2.5	**8.2**	1.0	.4	12.1
2019–20	Minnesota	34	13	27.8	.448	.379	.868	2.6	6.1	.7	.4	13.2
2019–20	Atlanta	25	4	20.8	.412	.333	**.887**	2.2	4.0	.8	.2	7.7
2020–21	Boston	34	5	18.1	.415	**.464**	.836	1.7	2.1	.8	.2	6.9
2020–21†	Milwaukee	21	2	15.9	.469	.385	.864	1.5	2.8	.4	.2	6.6
Career		826	600	26.8	.444	.360	.844	2.4	5.6	1.1	.3	12.2
All-Star		1	0	13.4	.667	1.000	.000	1.0	2.0	2.0	.0	14.0

==== Playoffs ====
Year	Team	GP	GS	MPG	FG%	3P%	FT%	RPG	APG	SPG	BPG	PPG
2010	Atlanta	9	0	6.6	.333	.400	—	.2	.4	.3	.1	1.8
2011	Atlanta	8	6	29.8	**.514**	.143	.826	2.1	3.5	.8	.4	11.8
2012	Atlanta	6	6	**37.5**	.411	.412	.895	**3.7**	4.2	.8	**.8**	14.0
2013	Atlanta	6	6	35.5	.333	.300	.821	2.8	5.0	**1.5**	.3	13.3
2014	Atlanta	7	7	34.6	.393	.333	**.950**	**3.7**	5.0	1.0	.6	**19.3**
2015	Atlanta	**16**	**16**	33.1	.410	.323	.867	3.2	**6.7**	**1.5**	.4	16.8
2016	Atlanta	10	10	27.9	.380	.250	.846	1.9	6.2	.6	.2	14.5
2017	Indiana	4	4	35.5	.489	**.529**	.833	3.3	6.3	1.0	**.8**	17.0
2018	Minnesota	5	5	30.6	.451	.389	.706	3.6	5.8	.6	.4	13.0
2021†	Milwaukee	**16**	0	7.4	.290	.455	.818	.5	.8	.2	.0	2.0
Career		87	60	25.3	.405	.343	.854	2.2	4.1	.8	.3	11.4

== Personal life ==
Teague is the son of Shawn and Carol Teague. His father, Shawn Teague, played college basketball at Missouri for a year and then three years at Boston University, playing under Rick Pitino. Also while at Boston University, Shawn played with Drederick Irving, the father of No. 1 2011 draft pick Kyrie Irving.

Teague has four siblings, including Marquis, who played point guard for the Kentucky Wildcats before being drafted by the Chicago Bulls in 2012.

== See also ==
- 2009 NCAA Men's Basketball All-Americans
