= Pero Antić =

Macedonian basketball player and executive (born 1982)

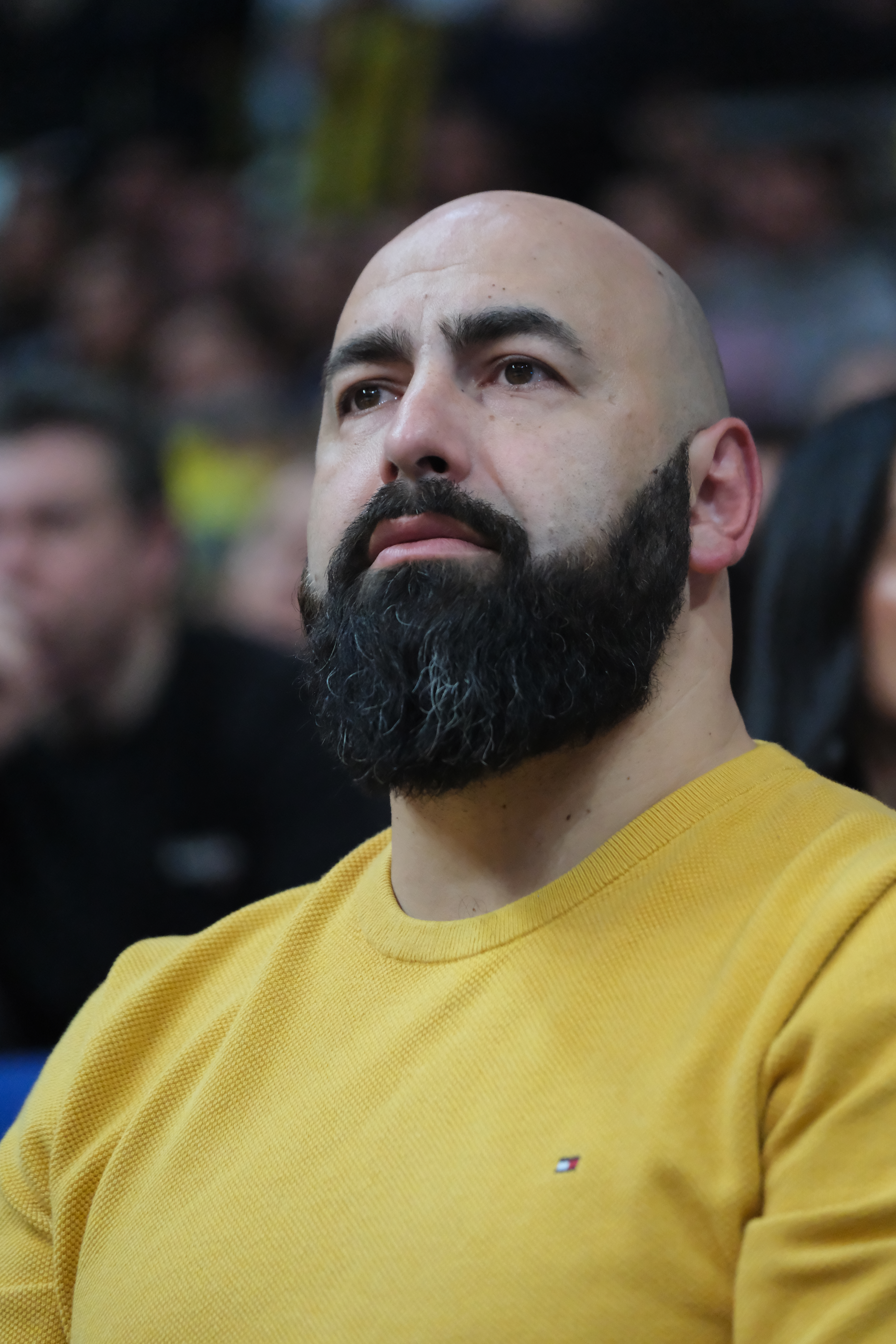
- Antić in 2025

Personal information
- Born: July 29, 1982 (age 44) Skopje, SR Macedonia, Yugoslavia
- Listed height: 2.11 m (6 ft 11 in)
- Listed weight: 118 kg (260 lb)

Career information
- NBA draft: 2004: undrafted
- Playing career: 1999–2018
- Position: Power forward / center
- Number: 6, 12

Career history
- 1999–2001: Rabotnički
- 2001–2005: AEK Athens
- 2005–2007: Crvena zvezda
- 2007–2008: Lukoil Academic
- 2008–2009: Lokomotiv Kuban
- 2009–2010: Lukoil Academic
- 2010–2011: Spartak St. Petersburg
- 2011–2013: Olympiacos
- 2013–2015: Atlanta Hawks
- 2015–2017: Fenerbahçe
- 2017–2018: Crvena zvezda

Career highlights
- 3× EuroLeague champion (2012, 2013, 2017); 2× Greek League champion (2002, 2012); 2× Turkish Super League champion (2016, 2017); Turkish Cup winner (2016); Turkish President's Cup winner (2016); Russian Cup winner (2011); Russian Cup MVP (2011); KLS champion (2018); Serbian Cup winner (2006); 2× Bulgarian League champion (2008, 2010); Bulgarian Cup winner (2008); Bulgarian League MVP (2008); Macedonian First League (2001)
- Stats at NBA.com
- Stats at Basketball Reference

Pero Antić (Macedonian: Перо Антиќ, pronounced ['pɛrɔ 'antic]; born July 29, 1982) is a Macedonian basketball executive and former professional player. He currently serves as a president of the Basketball Federation of North Macedonia.

Antić was a member and captain of the Macedonian national basketball team. Standing at 6 ft 11 in (2.11 m), he primarily played the power forward position, although he was able to play at the center position.

== Professional career ==
=== Early years ===
Antić has played with: Rabotnički Skopje, AEK Athens, Crvena zvezda, Academic Sofia, Lokomotiv Kuban, Spartak St. Petersburg and Olympiacos. He won the 2006 Serbia and Montenegro National Cup with Red Star Belgrade. He was voted the MVP of the 2007–08 season in the Bulgarian National Basketball League, a season in which he averaged 23.3 points and 9.3 rebounds per game.

In the EuroChallenge 2010–11 season, he helped Spartak St. Petersburg reach the EuroChallenge Final Four, averaging 9.6 points and 6.1 rebounds per game.

=== Olympiacos ===
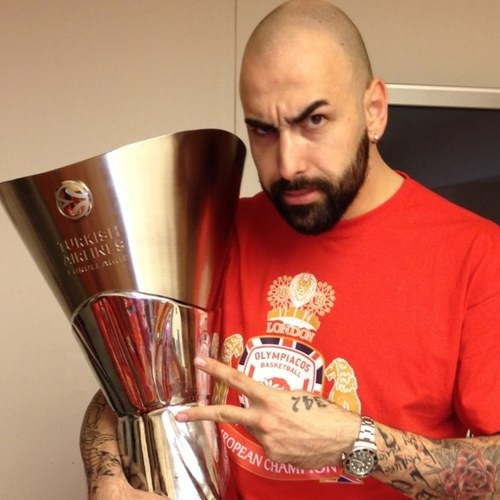
Antić with the EuroLeague championship trophy.

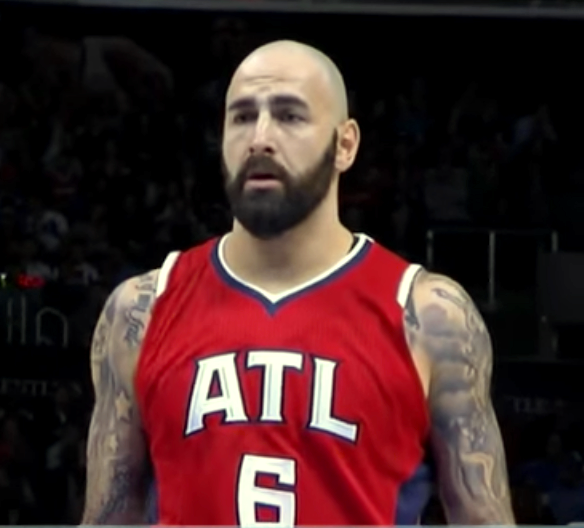
Antić with the Atlanta Hawks (2014)

Pero Antić with KK Crvena zvezda (2017)

After an impressive performance at the EuroBasket 2011, Antić signed a two-year contract on September 26 with Olympiacos Piraeus. With Olympiacos, he won the EuroLeague title two times, in 2012 and 2013. He also helped his team to win the 2011–12 Greek League championship.

=== Atlanta Hawks ===
On July 25, 2013, Antić signed a two-year contract with the Atlanta Hawks. In his first pre-season game against the Miami Heat, he played 16 minutes and finished with three points and four rebounds, shooting just 1-8 from the floor and 1-6 from three. Antić scored his first points in an official game on November 1, in a 102–95 home win over the Toronto Raptors.

On December 28, at home against the Charlotte Bobcats, Antić scored a game-tying three-pointer off one leg with three seconds left in the game, tying the score and forcing the game into overtime. Atlanta won the game 118–116. On January 3 against the Golden State Warriors, Antić was in the starting lineup for the first time in his NBA career, due to the injury of starting center Al Horford. He responded with a then career-high 16 points and 7 rebounds while shooting 6-9 from the floor, including four three-pointers from six attempts. However, Atlanta was defeated, as Andre Iguodala hit the buzzer-beater from behind the arc to give his team a 101–100 victory over the Hawks.

After a series of solid performances as a starter for the Hawks, Antić was selected as a participant in the Rising Stars Challenge game for the NBA All-Star 2014 in New Orleans. However, because of an injury to his right ankle, Antić was forced to miss the All-Star weekend, being replaced by the Phoenix Suns' big man Miles Plumlee.

On April 6, 2014, Antić scored a career-high 18 points in a 107–88 win over the Indiana Pacers.

The Hawks finished the regular season with a record of 38–44, which was enough for the last playoff seed in the Eastern Conference, pairing them in the first round with the number one seed on the East, the Indiana Pacers. Antić was a starter in the first game of the series, tallying 8 points and 7 rebounds in his playoff debut while also successfully guarding All-Star center Roy Hibbert. The Hawks took a surprising victory 101–93 away from home to take the lead in the series. During the game, Antić got involved in a confrontation with the Pacers' David West, which led to both players receiving technical fouls.

=== Fenerbahçe ===
On June 30, 2015, he signed a two-year contract with the option of additional year, with the Turkish team Fenerbahçe. In his first season with the team, Antić won the Turkish Cup with a 67–65 win over Darüşşafaka. Fenerbahçe also reached the final game of the 2016 Euroleague Final Four, but fell short of winning the EuroLeague championship, after an overtime 96–101 loss to CSKA Moscow. Over 23 EuroLeague games, he averaged 8 points and 4.3 rebounds per game. At the end of the season, Fenerbahçe also won the Turkish League championship.

=== Crvena zvezda ===
On September 11, 2017, Antić returned to Crvena zvezda, signing a contract for the 2017–18 season.

== National team career ==
Antić was a member and captain of the senior men's Republic of Macedonia national team. He was instrumental in his team reaching the semi-finals of FIBA EuroBasket 2011 in Lithuania. Antić proved his reputation as one of the tournament's best rebounders, having an average of 8.8 rebounds per game, third best in the category. He also averaged 11.5 points per game, with his tournament high coming in the semi-finals against Spain, where he scored 17 points in a 92–80 defeat. He was among the overall leaders in several other categories. Besides being fourth in average minutes per game (34.5), he also ranked fourth in double-doubles, collecting three, against Finland (14 points and 19 rebounds), Bosnia and Herzegovina (15 points and 14 rebounds) and Russia (15 points and 10 rebounds). While hardly the revelation of the tournament, he fulfilled his full potential at the EuroBasket, and was the cornerstone of the Macedonian national team's defensive strategy, that propelled them to the top four.

Antić captained the Macedonian national team at the FIBA EuroBasket 2013, although to a much lesser success. Although he scored in double figures in four of the five group matches, averaging 13.8 points and 8 rebounds per game, Macedonia was eliminated in the group stage, after which Antić announced his retirement from the national team.

== Player profile ==
Antić's best offensive attributes are his body strength, jump shot, and dunking ability. He is adept at pick and roll play, which coupled with his excellent three-point shooting accuracy for a player of his position, makes him a scoring threat from all distances. While he's not a prolific scorer, he also possesses decent passing skills, adding to his offensive contribution. The defensive part of the game is considered to be one of his best attributes. Antić's anticipation, positioning, and overall athleticism made him a good rebounder in Europe. Antić demonstrated particular determination and confidence when guarding opposition star players, such as Dirk Nowitzki and Pau Gasol at the EuroBasket 2011.

== Career statistics ==
Legend
GP	Games played	GS	Games started	MPG	Minutes per game
FG%	Field-goal percentage	3P%	3-point field-goal percentage	FT%	Free-throw percentage
RPG	Rebounds per game	APG	Assists per game	SPG	Steals per game
BPG	Blocks per game	PPG	Points per game	PIR	Performance index rating
**Bold**	Career high

=== NBA ===
==== Regular season ====
Year	Team	GP	GS	MPG	FG%	3P%	FT%	RPG	APG	SPG	BPG	PPG
2013–14	Atlanta	50	**26**	**18.5**	**.418**	**.327**	**.758**	**4.2**	**1.2**	**.4**	**.2**	**7.0**
2014–15	Atlanta	**63**	3	16.5	.365	.301	.715	3.0	.8	.3	**.2**	5.7
Career		113	29	17.4	.392	.314	.730	3.5	.9	.3	.2	6.3

==== Playoffs ====
Year	Team	GP	GS	MPG	FG%	3P%	FT%	RPG	APG	SPG	BPG	PPG
2014	Atlanta	7	**7**	**24.3**	.167	.120	.625	**3.9**	**.7**	**.7**	**.4**	3.1
2015	Atlanta	**15**	1	13.3	**.320**	**.344**	**.800**	2.9	.3	.1	.2	**4.2**
Career		22	8	16.8	.250	.246	.758	3.2	.4	.3	.3	3.9

=== EuroLeague ===
†	Denotes season in which Antić won the EuroLeague
*	Led the league

Year	Team	GP	GS	MPG	FG%	3P%	FT%	RPG	APG	SPG	BPG	PPG	PIR
2001–02	AEK Athens	7	1	4.6	**.500**	.000	—	1.1	.1	.1	—	0.9	0.1
2002–03	AEK Athens	12	3	15.0	.395	.294	.600	2.5	**1.1**	.3	.3	4.3	1.8
2003–04	AEK Athens	3	0	7.3	.333	.250	.000	1.7	—	.3	.3	2.3	0.3
2004–05	AEK Athens	15	0	11.5	.393	.333	.593	2.9	.5	.3	**.4**	4.6	2.7
2011–12†	Olympiacos	22	**18**	18.7	.350	.250	**.772**	**4.3**	.8	.5	.3	7.2	7.3
2012–13†	Olympiacos	**31***	4	18.1	.354	.261	.659	3.5	.7	.4	.2	6.0	5.3
2015–16	Fenerbahçe	23	10	**21.1**	.388	**.373**	.769	**4.3**	.7	.2	.0	**8.0**	**8.4**
2016–17†	Fenerbahçe	**31**	11	13.5	.333	.338	.744	2.4	.6	.4	.1	4.2	4.5
2017–18	Crvena zvezda	18	2	18.2	.317	.274	.771	3.4	**1.1**	**.7**	.1	6.2	6.2
Career		162	49	16.1	.357	.299	.716	3.3	.7	.4	.2	5.6	5.0

== Personal life ==
Antić was born in Skopje, SFR Yugoslavia (modern-day North Macedonia). Antić is a supporter of Belgrade club Red Star, where he also played from 2005 to 2007 and 2017‒2018.

Antić married his wife Ružica in 2006. They have sons named Luka, Pavel and Petar. They divorced in 2019.

Antić has several tattoos, including ones of his family, Crvena zvezda team supporters (Delije) badge on his right under-arm, and a stylized flag of Macedonia on his right chest. Aside from Macedonian, Antić also holds Bulgarian citizenship.

After the FIBA EuroBasket 2011 in Lithuania, Antić was awarded with the Honoris causa academic title, by FON University in Skopje.

On April 8, 2015, Antić and teammate Thabo Sefolosha were arrested outside a nightclub in New York City for interfering with police after Chris Copeland of the Indiana Pacers was stabbed in the abdomen. His case was later dropped on September 9, 2015.

During the month of July 2024, Antić was seen working as an assistant coach for the Phoenix Suns in the 2024 NBA Summer League out in Las Vegas. His addition is considered a tryout for one of the open assistant coach positions for head coach Mike Budenholzer's new coaching staff there.

== See also ==
- List of KK Crvena zvezda players with 100 games played
