= Mike Scott (basketball, born 1988) =

American basketball player (born 1988)

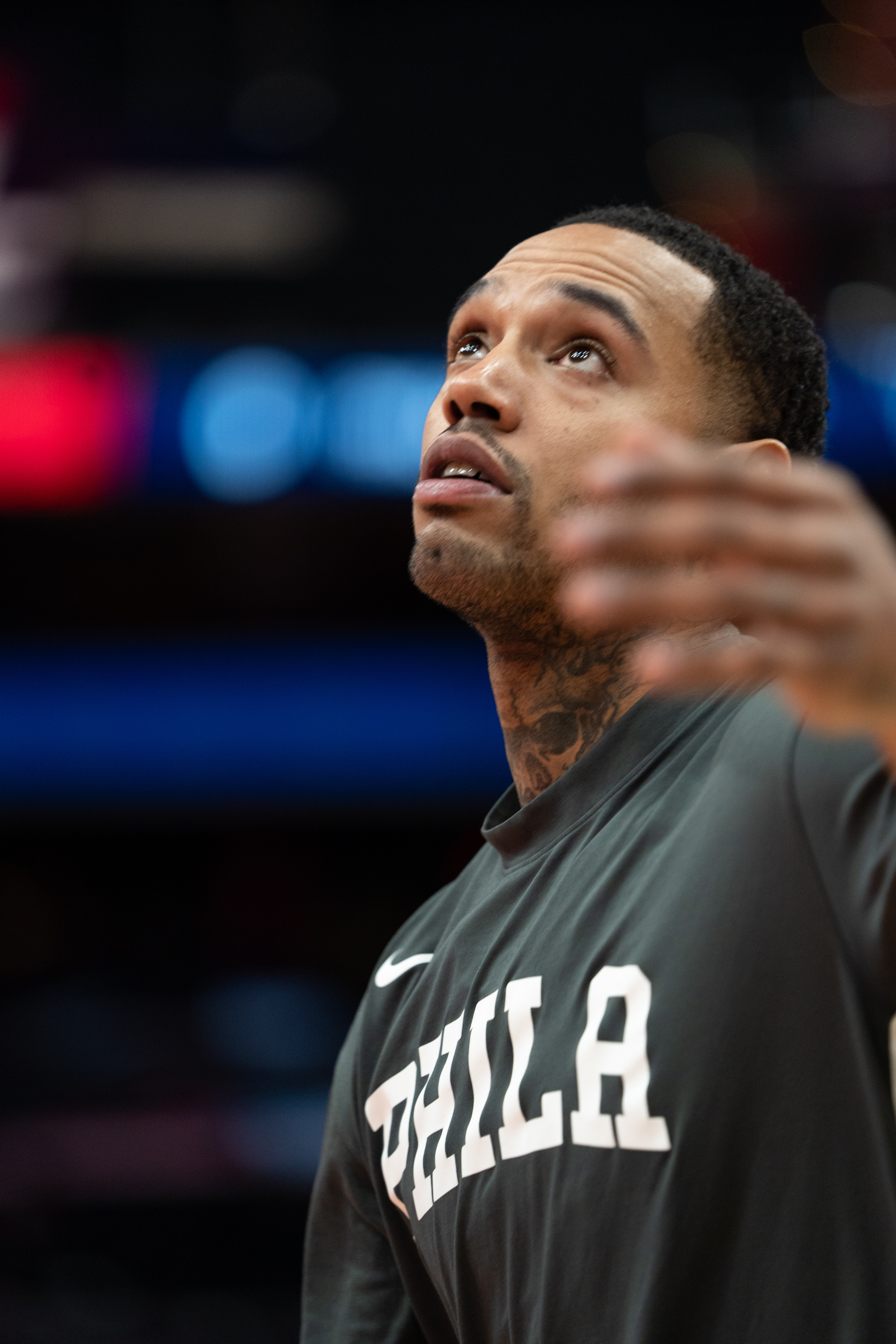
- Scott with the Philadelphia 76ers in 2019

Free agent
- Position: Power forward

Personal information
- Born: July 16, 1988 (age 38) Chesapeake, Virginia, U.S.
- Listed height: 6 ft 7 in (2.01 m)
- Listed weight: 237 lb (108 kg)

Career information
- High school: Deep Creek (Chesapeake, Virginia); Hargrave Military Academy (Chatham, Virginia)
- College: Virginia (2007–2012)
- NBA draft: 2012: 2nd round, 43rd overall pick
- Drafted by: Atlanta Hawks
- Playing career: 2012–present

Career history
- 2012–2017: Atlanta Hawks
- 2012–2013: →Bakersfield Jam
- 2016: →Delaware 87ers
- 2016–2017: →Long Island Nets
- 2017–2018: Washington Wizards
- 2018–2019: Los Angeles Clippers
- 2019–2021: Philadelphia 76ers
- 2022–2023: SLUC Nancy Basket
- 2023: Gigantes de Carolina
- 2023–2024: ASVEL
- 2024: Gigantes de Carolina

Career highlights
- BSN champion (2023); BSN Finals MVP (2023); Third-team All-American – SN (2012); First-team All-ACC (2012)
- Stats at NBA.com
- Stats at Basketball Reference

James Michael Scott (born July 16, 1988) is an American professional basketball player who last played for Gigantes de Carolina of the Puerto Rican Baloncesto Superior Nacional. He played college basketball for the Virginia Cavaliers, before being taken in the second round of the 2012 NBA draft, and spending ten seasons in the NBA.

== High school career ==
Scott played his high school career at Deep Creek High School and then prepped for a year at Hargrave Military Academy.

Considered a four-star recruit by Rivals.com, Scott was listed as the No. 33 power forward and the No. 115 player in the nation in 2007.

== College career ==
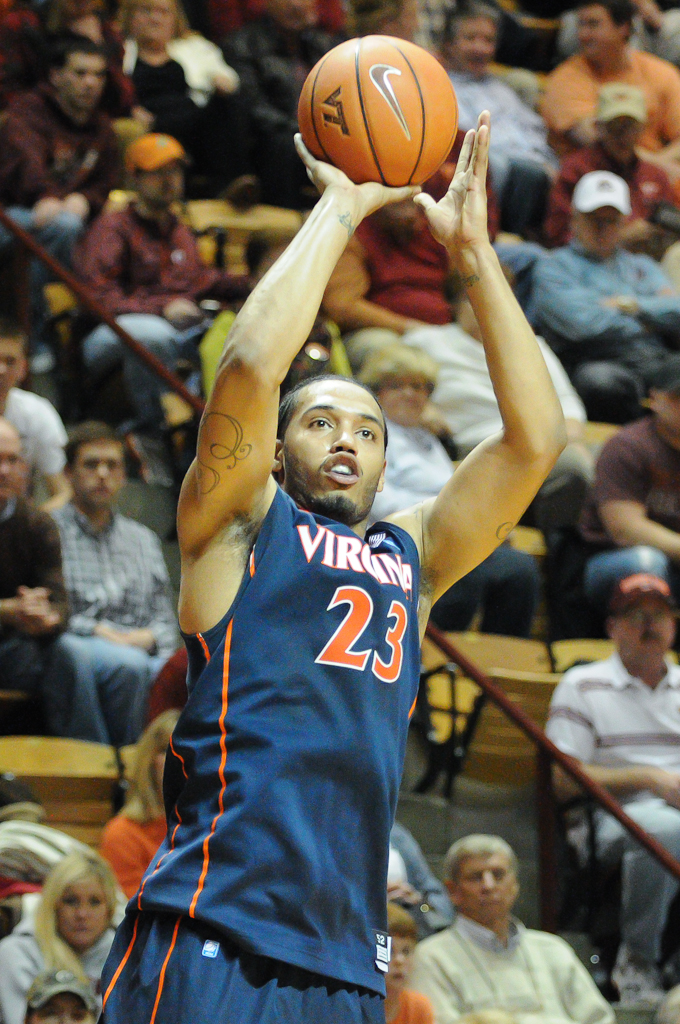
Scott with Virginia in February 2012

After a solid first three years in which he led the Virginia Cavaliers in rebounding as a sophomore and junior, Scott appeared poised for a breakout year in 2010–11. He began the year averaging 15.9 points and 10.2 rebounds in the team's first ten games. But Scott's season ended early as he suffered an ankle injury and underwent season-ending surgery.

Due to his injury, Scott was granted a medical redshirt and a fifth year of eligibility. He was one of the top players in the Atlantic Coast Conference (ACC) in 2011–12, averaging 18.0 points and 8.3 rebounds per game and led the ACC in field goal percentage at .563. He led the Cavaliers to a 22–10 record and their first NCAA tournament berth in five years, but lost to Florida in the round of 64. Scott received conference recognition as the second-leading vote getter for the All-ACC team and national recognition as an All-American by the Sporting News (third team) and the Associated Press (Honorable Mention).

Scott finished his Virginia career with 1,538 points and is the third leading rebounder in Cavalier history with 944.

== Professional career ==
=== Atlanta Hawks (2012–2017) ===
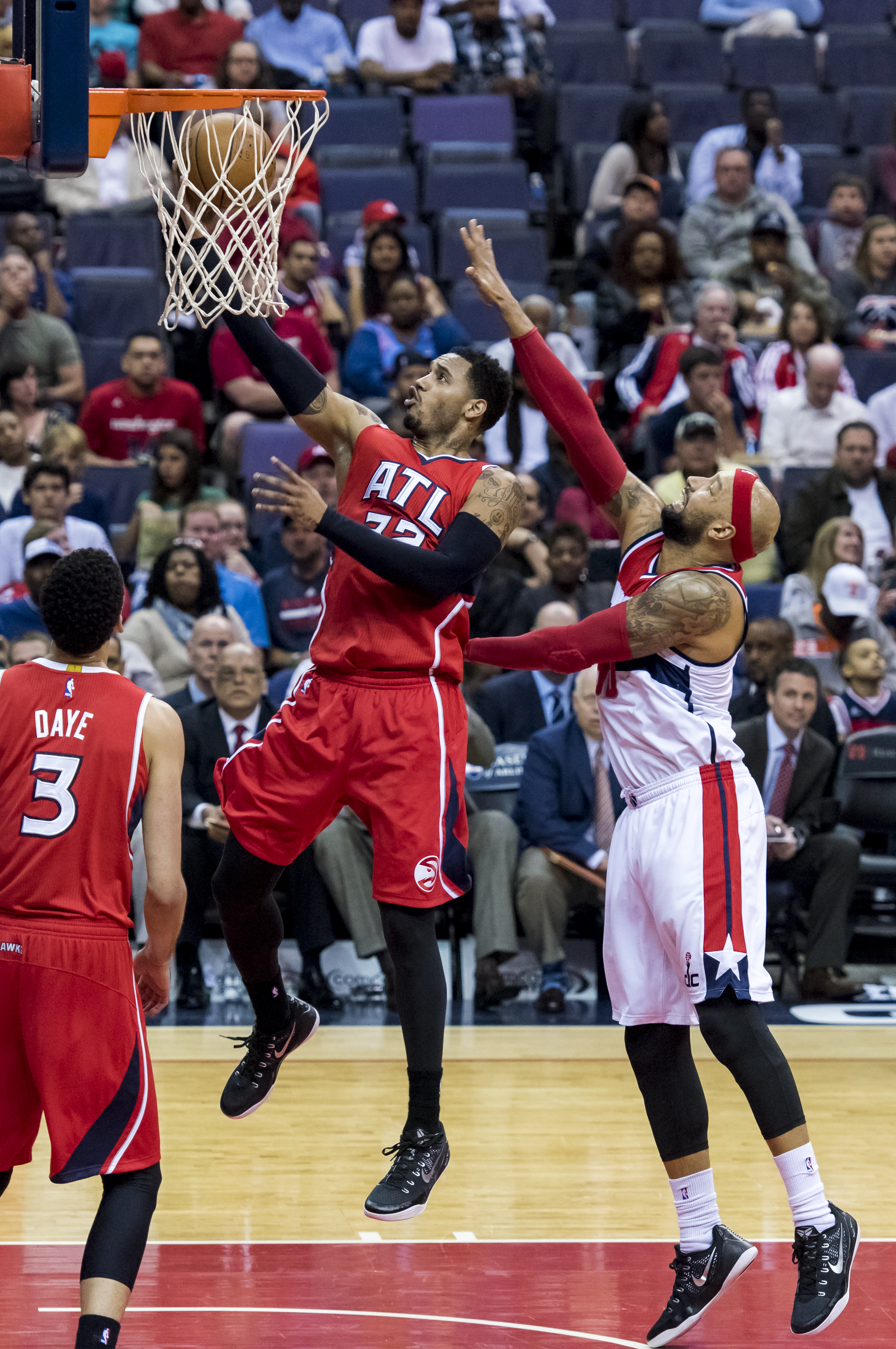
Scott with the Hawks in April 2015

On June 28, 2012, Scott was selected by the Atlanta Hawks with the 43rd overall pick in the 2012 NBA draft. On September 6, 2012, he signed with the Hawks. On December 1, 2012, he was assigned to the Bakersfield Jam of the NBA Development League. He was recalled by the Hawks on December 11, reassigned on March 1, and recalled again on March 6.

On February 22, 2014, Scott scored a career-high 30 points in a 107–98 win over the New York Knicks. He became a primary scoring option off the bench for the Hawks in 2013–14, averaging a career-high 9.6 points per game on the season.

On August 26, 2014, Scott re-signed with the Hawks. On March 14, 2015, he was ruled out indefinitely after suffering a left toe injury against the Denver Nuggets three days earlier. He missed 11 games with the injury, returning to action on April 4 against the Brooklyn Nets.

After getting arrested in July 2015 for drug possession, many believed Scott would be cut by the Hawks. With his legal process still pending, Atlanta chose to keep Scott on the roster for the 2015–16 season. He shot a career-best 3-point percentage during the year, reaching as high as 40.9%.

On October 31, 2016, Scott was ruled out for four weeks while undergoing a series of non-surgical procedures for his left knee soreness. During the 2016–17 season, he had three assignments to the NBA Development League, two with the Long Island Nets and one with the Delaware 87ers.

On February 23, 2017, Scott was traded, along with the rights to Cenk Akyol and cash considerations, to the Phoenix Suns in exchange for a top-55 protected 2017 second-round pick. He was waived by the Suns the following day.

=== Washington Wizards (2017–2018) ===
On July 9, 2017, Scott signed with the Washington Wizards.

=== Los Angeles Clippers (2018–2019) ===
On July 9, 2018, Scott signed with the Los Angeles Clippers.

=== Philadelphia 76ers (2019–2021) ===
On February 6, 2019, Scott was traded, along with Tobias Harris and Boban Marjanović, to the Philadelphia 76ers in exchange for Wilson Chandler, Mike Muscala, Landry Shamet and a number of future draft picks. On July 11, Scott re-signed with the 76ers for two years on a deal worth $9.8 million.

=== SLUC Nancy Basket (2022–2023) ===
On October 16, 2022, Scott signed with SLUC Nancy Basket of the LNB Pro A.

=== Gigantes de Carolina (2023) ===
On May 30, 2023, Scott signed with the Gigantes de Carolina in Puerto Rico and helped them secure Carolina first Championship in the BSN. He was named Finals MVP for his performance.

=== ASVEL (2023–2024) ===
On July 31, 2023, Scott signed with ASVEL of the French LNB Pro A.

=== Return to Gigantes (2024) ===
On March 23, 2024, Scott re-signed with the Gigantes de Carolina.

== Career statistics ==
Legend
GP	Games played	GS	Games started	MPG	Minutes per game
FG%	Field goal percentage	3P%	3-point field goal percentage	FT%	Free throw percentage
RPG	Rebounds per game	APG	Assists per game	SPG	Steals per game
BPG	Blocks per game	PPG	Points per game	**Bold**	Career high

=== NBA ===
==== Regular season ====
Year	Team	GP	GS	MPG	FG%	3P%	FT%	RPG	APG	SPG	BPG	PPG
2012–13	Atlanta	40	1	9.4	.476	.000	.768	2.8	.3	.1	.1	4.6
2013–14	Atlanta	**80**	6	18.5	.479	.310	.780	3.6	.9	.4	.1	**9.6**
2014–15	Atlanta	68	0	16.5	.444	.344	.792	2.9	**1.1**	.4	.0	7.8
2015–16	Atlanta	75	0	15.3	.468	.392	.794	2.7	1.0	.3	.2	6.2
2016–17	Atlanta	18	0	10.8	.293	.148	**.875**	2.1	.9	.2	.2	2.5
2017–18	Washington	76	1	18.5	**.527**	**.405**	.658	3.3	**1.1**	.3	.1	8.8
2018–19	L.A. Clippers	52	0	14.4	.400	.391	.667	3.3	.8	.3	.2	4.8
2018–19	Philadelphia	27	3	**24.0**	.400	.412	.667	**3.8**	.8	.3	.2	7.8
2019–20	Philadelphia	68	11	17.8	.426	.369	.811	3.6	.8	.3	.1	6.0
2020–21	Philadelphia	51	**12**	16.7	.360	.342	.667	2.4	.8	**.5**	**.3**	4.2
Career		555	34	16.5	.453	.362	.757	3.1	.9	.3	.1	6.7

==== Playoffs ====
Year	Team	GP	GS	MPG	FG%	3P%	FT%	RPG	APG	SPG	BPG	PPG
2013	Atlanta	4	0	5.0	.500	.000	.750	1.8	.3	—	—	3.3
2014	Atlanta	7	0	20.9	.365	.323	.714	2.6	.4	.1	—	9.4
2015	Atlanta	**11**	0	15.6	.382	.154	**1.000**	**4.2**	.5	**.5**	—	4.5
2016	Atlanta	10	0	16.1	.625	.500	.875	3.2	.5	.3	**.3**	6.5
2018	Washington	6	0	21.0	**.634**	**.636**	**1.000**	3.5	**.7**	.3	.2	**10.8**
2019	Philadelphia	10	0	19.3	.447	.353	**1.000**	3.4	.5	.3	—	5.6
2020	Philadelphia	4	0	5.0	.200	.000	**1.000**	2.0	.3	—	—	1.5
2021	Philadelphia	5	0	6.8	.222	.286	—	.6	.6	.2	.2	1.2
Career		57	0	15.3	.459	.336	.857	3.0	.5	.3	.1	5.7

=== EuroLeague ===
Year	Team	GP	GS	MPG	FG%	3P%	FT%	RPG	APG	SPG	BPG	PPG	PIR
2023–24	ASVEL	29	7	22.2	.488	.343	.816	3.9	1.2	.4	—	10.4	9.7
Career		29	7	22.2	.488	.343	.816	3.9	1.2	.4	—	10.4	9.7

=== Domestic leagues ===
Year	Team	League	GP	MPG	FG%	3P%	FT%	RPG	APG	SPG	BPG	PPG
2012–13	(United States) Bakersfield Jam	D-League	7	32.6	.505	.000	.805	8.3	1.4	.7	—	18.1
2016–17	(United States) Delaware 87ers	D-League	2	20.7	.368	.300	—	3.0	1.0	—	—	8.5
2016–17	(United States) Long Island Nets	D-League	4	25.1	.426	.350	.333	5.0	2.0	.7	1.5	16.5
2022–23	(France) SLUC Nancy	LNB Élite	27	30.1	.509	.371	.846	6.6	1.7	.5	.0	14.3
2022–23	(Puerto Rico) Gigantes de Carolina	BSN	25	35.3	.511	.403	.750	9.4	2.2	.8	.2	21.8
2023–24	(France) ASVEL	LNB Élite	32	22.3	.506	.394	.756	4.5	1.5	.2	.0	10.0

=== College ===
Year	Team	GP	GS	MPG	FG%	3P%	FT%	RPG	APG	SPG	BPG	PPG
2007–08	Virginia	32	21	18.1	.441	.400	.703	5.3	.5	.6	.4	5.7
2008–09	Virginia	28	19	27.6	.544	.333	.741	7.4	.8	.9	.3	10.3
2009–10	Virginia	28	25	27.4	.505	.429	.719	7.2	1.3	.6	.3	12.0
2010–11	Virginia	10	9	33.7	.482	1.000	.881	10.2	1.6	.3	.7	15.9
2011–12	Virginia	32	32	31.2	.563	.300	.808	8.3	1.2	.7	.5	18.0
Career		130	106	26.6	.521	.364	.775	7.3	1.0	.7	.4	11.8

== Personal life ==
On July 30, 2015, Scott and his brother, Antonn, were arrested for drug charges after 35.2 grams of marijuana and 10.9 grams of MDMA were found in a SUV driven by Antonn. The vehicle originally had been stopped for following too closely in Banks County, Georgia on Interstate 85 northeast of Atlanta; the vehicle failed to yield for about two miles, with speeds reaching 98 mph, before it finally pulled over. Scott was facing a possible 25-year prison sentence for his drug charges. On May 2, 2017, a Georgia superior court issued a ruling to suppress all evidence and dismiss the felony drug case against Scott and his brother, largely based upon testimony and evidence that suggested a pattern of racial profiling by law enforcement in the county.
