= 2013–14 Atlanta Hawks season =

NBA professional basketball team season

- Head coach: Mike Budenholzer
- Owners: Atlanta Spirit LLC
- Arena: Philips Arena

Results
- Record: 38–44 (.463)
- Place: Division: 4th (Southeast); Conference: 8th (Eastern)
- Playoff finish: First Round (lost to Pacers 3–4)
- Stats at Basketball Reference

Local media
- Television: SportsSouth
- Radio: WQXI (AM)

The 2013–14 Atlanta Hawks season was the 65th season of the franchise in the National Basketball Association (NBA) and the 46th in Atlanta.

== Key dates ==
- June 27: The 2013 NBA draft took place at Barclays Center in Brooklyn, New York.
- July 1: 2013 NBA free agency began.

== Draft picks ==
Round	Pick	Player	Position	Nationality	School/Club team
1	17	Dennis Schröder	Guard	Germany	Phantoms Braunschweig
1	18	Shane Larkin	Guard	United States	Miami (FL)
2	47	Raul Neto	Guard	Brazil	Lagun Aro GBC
2	50	James Ennis	Forward	United States	Long Beach State

== Roster ==
2013–14 Atlanta Hawks roster
Players

Pos.	No.	Player	Height	Weight	DOB	From
F/C	6	Pero Antić	6 ft 11 in (2.11 m)	260 lb (118 kg)	1982–07–29	Macedonia
F/C	14	Gustavo Ayón	6 ft 10 in (2.08 m)	250 lb (113 kg)	1985–04–01	UPAEP
F/C	42	Elton Brand	6 ft 9 in (2.06 m)	254 lb (115 kg)	1979–03–11	Duke
F	5	DeMarre Carroll	6 ft 8 in (2.03 m)	212 lb (96 kg)	1986–07–27	Missouri
F/C	15	Al Horford	6 ft 10 in (2.08 m)	250 lb (113 kg)	1986–06–03	Florida
G	12	John Jenkins	6 ft 4 in (1.93 m)	215 lb (98 kg)	1991–03–06	Vanderbilt
G/F	26	Kyle Korver	6 ft 7 in (2.01 m)	212 lb (96 kg)	1981–03–17	Creighton
G	8	Shelvin Mack	6 ft 3 in (1.91 m)	207 lb (94 kg)	1990–04–22	Butler
G/F	20	Cartier Martin	6 ft 7 in (2.01 m)	220 lb (100 kg)	1984–11–20	Kansas State
F	4	Paul Millsap	6 ft 8 in (2.03 m)	253 lb (115 kg)	1985–02–10	Louisiana Tech
F/C	31	Mike Muscala	6 ft 11 in (2.11 m)	239 lb (108 kg)	1991–07–01	Bucknell
G	17	Dennis Schröder	6 ft 1 in (1.85 m)	168 lb (76 kg)	1993–09–15	Germany
F	32	Mike Scott	6 ft 8 in (2.03 m)	237 lb (108 kg)	1988–07–16	Virginia
G	0	Jeff Teague	6 ft 2 in (1.88 m)	181 lb (82 kg)	1988–06–10	Wake Forest
G	3	Louis Williams	6 ft 1 in (1.85 m)	175 lb (79 kg)	1986–10–27	South Gwinnett HS (GA)

Coaches
Head coach
- Mike Budenholzer
Assistant(s)
- Quin Snyder
- Taylor Jenkins
- Darvin Ham
- Kenny Atkinson
- Jim Thomas

Legend
- (DP) Unsigned draft pick
- (FA) Free agent
- (S) Suspended
- (DL) On assignment to D-League affiliate
- Injured

Roster
Updated: 2014–02–27

== Pre-season ==
2013 pre-season game log
Total: 1–6 (home: 0–3; road: 1–3)
Pre-season: 1–6 (home: 0–3; road: 1–3)

Game	Date	Team	Score	High points	High rebounds	High assists	Location Attendance	Record
1	October 7	@ Miami	L 87–92	Mike Scott (13)	Al Horford (9)	Horford, Teague, & Mack (4)	American Airlines Arena; 19,600	0–1
2	October 8	@ Charlotte	W 87–85	Mike Scott (19)	Millsap & Brand (8)	Dennis Schröder (7)	U.S. Cellular Center; 4,457	1–1
3	October 13	@ New Orleans	L 73–105	Al Horford (21)	Horford & Brand (6)	Royal Ivey (6)	Mississippi Coast Coliseum; 3,956	1–2
4	October 17	San Antonio	L 104–106	Kyle Korver (26)	Millsap & Horford (11)	Jeff Teague (12)	Philips Arena; 8,166	1–3
5	October 20	Memphis	L 82–90	Paul Millsap (19)	Paul Millsap (8)	Horford, Korver, Teague (5)	Philips Arena; 8,731	1–4
6	October 22	Indiana	L 89–107	Teague & Scott (17)	Kyle Korver (9)	Jeff Teague (8)	Philips Arena; 8,263	1–5
7	October 23	@ Dallas	L 88–98	Dennis Schröder (21)	Pero Antić (8)	Dennis Schröder (4)	American Airlines Center; 16,160	1–6

2013–14 season schedule

== Regular season ==
=== Game log ===
2013–14 game log
Total: 38–44 (home: 24–17; road: 14–27)
October: 0–1 (home: 0–0; road: 0–1)

Game	Date	Team	Score	High points	High rebounds	High assists	Location Attendance	Record
1	October 30	@ Dallas	L 109–118	Jeff Teague (24)	DeMarre Carroll (7)	Jeff Teague (9)	American Airlines Center; 19,834	0–1

November: 9–8 (home: 5–3; road: 4–5)

Game	Date	Team	Score	High points	High rebounds	High assists	Location Attendance	Record
2	November 1	Toronto	W 102–95	Al Horford (22)	Al Horford (16)	Jeff Teague (12)	Philips Arena; 18,118	1–1
3	November 3	@ L.A. Lakers	L 103–105	Kyle Korver (22)	Al Horford (16)	Millsap, Korver, Teague, Schröder (4)	Staples Center; 18,997	1–2
4	November 5	@ Sacramento	W 105–100	Al Horford (27)	Paul Millsap (11)	Jeff Teague (10)	Sleep Train Arena; 13,506	2–2
5	November 7	@ Denver	L 107–109	Paul Millsap (29)	Paul Millsap (10)	Jeff Teague (11)	Pepsi Center; 15,404	2–3
6	November 9	Orlando	W 104–94	Jeff Teague (19)	Paul Millsap (11)	Jeff Teague (13)	Philips Arena; 15,189	3–3
7	November 11	@ Charlotte	W 103–94	Al Horford (24)	DeMarre Carroll (10)	Jeff Teague (12)	Time Warner Cable Arena; 13,996	4–3
8	November 13	New York	L 91–95	Jeff Teague (25)	DeMarre Carroll (9)	Jeff Teague (8)	Philips Arena; 15,057	4–4
9	November 15	Philadelphia	W 113–103	Jeff Teague (33)	Al Horford (8)	Jeff Teague (10)	Philips Arena; 12,070	5–4
10	November 16	@ New York	W 110–90	Jeff Teague (16)	Paul Millsap (13)	Shelvin Mack (12)	Madison Square Garden; 19,812	6–4
11	November 19	@ Miami	L 88–104	Mike Scott (15)	Mike Scott (10)	Jeff Teague (7)	American Airlines Arena; 19,600	6–5
12	November 20	Detroit	W 93–85	Paul Millsap (19)	DeMarre Carroll (12)	Jeff Teague (7)	Philips Arena; 13,167	7–5
13	November 22	@ Detroit	W 96–89	Jeff Teague (18)	Al Horford (11)	Jeff Teague (9)	Palace of Auburn Hills; 13,467	8–5
14	November 23	Boston	L 87–94	Al Horford (18)	Al Horford (7)	Jeff Teague (10)	Philips Arena; 15,189	8–6
15	November 26	Orlando	L 92–109	Teague & Horford (15)	DeMarre Carroll (7)	Lou Williams (8)	Philips Arena; 13,164	8–7
16	November 27	@ Houston	L 84–113	Paul Millsap (16)	Al Horford (8)	Jeff Teague (6)	Toyota Center; 18,051	8–8
17	November 29	Dallas	W 88–87	Jeff Teague (25)	Al Horford (12)	Jeff Teague (6)	Philips Arena; 15,463	9–8
18	November 30	@ Washington	L 101–108	Paul Millsap (23)	Paul Millsap (10)	Shelvin Mack (6)	Verizon Center; 14,280	9–9

December: 9–5 (home: 7–1; road: 2–4)

Game	Date	Team	Score	High points	High rebounds	High assists	Location Attendance	Record
19	December 2	@ San Antonio	L 100–102	Jeff Teague (19)	Paul Millsap (14)	Jeff Teague (7)	AT&T Center; 17,318	9–10
20	December 4	L.A. Clippers	W 107–97	Paul Millsap (25)	Millsap & Horford (9)	Millsap & Teague (6)	Philips Arena; 12,020	10–10
21	December 6	Cleveland	W 108–89	Al Horford (22)	Paul Millsap (14)	Jeff Teague (6)	Philips Arena; 13,282	11–10
22	December 10	Oklahoma City	L 92–101	Paul Millsap (23)	Paul Millsap (12)	Teague & Martin (6)	Philips Arena; 12,503	11–11
23	December 13	Washington	W 101–99 (OT)	Al Horford (34)	Al Horford (15)	Jeff Teague (7)	Philips Arena; 11,251	12–11
24	December 14	@ New York	L 106–111	Lou Williams (27)	Paul Millsap (8)	Jeff Teague (6)	Madison Square Garden; 19,812	12–12
25	December 16	L.A. Lakers	W 114–100	Al Horford (19)	Al Horford (11)	Jeff Teague (10)	Philips Arena; 15,146	13–12
26	December 18	Sacramento	W 124–107	Kyle Korver (28)	Al Horford (10)	Jeff Teague (15)	Philips Arena; 10,185	14–12
27	December 20	Utah	W 118–85	Lou Williams (25)	Paul Millsap (10)	Jeff Teague (8)	Philips Arena; 11,150	15–12
28	December 23	@ Miami	L 119–121 (OT)	Jeff Teague (26)	Al Horford (11)	Jeff Teague (8)	American Airlines Arena; 20,204	15–13
29	December 26	@ Cleveland	W 127–125 (2OT)	Jeff Teague (34)	Paul Millsap (11)	Jeff Teague (14)	Quicken Loans Arena; 18,682	16–13
30	December 28	Charlotte	W 118–116 (OT)	Paul Millsap (33)	Paul Millsap (13)	Jeff Teague (9)	Philips Arena; 15,180	17–13
31	December 29	@ Orlando	L 102–109	Jeff Teague (22)	Paul Millsap (7)	Jeff Teague (8)	Amway Center; 15,415	17–14
32	December 31	@ Boston	W 92–91	Paul Millsap (34)	Paul Millsap (15)	Teague, Korver, Mack (5)	TD Garden; 18,624	18–14

January: 6–7 (home: 3–3; road: 3–4)

Game	Date	Team	Score	High points	High rebounds	High assists	Location Attendance	Record
33	January 3	Golden State	L 100–101	Pero Antić (16)	Paul Millsap (11)	Jeff Teague (7)	Philips Arena; 15,210	18–15
34	January 4	@ Chicago	L 84–91	Teague & Millsap (16)	Paul Millsap (12)	Jeff Teague (6)	United Center; 21,539	18–16
35	January 6	@ Brooklyn	L 86–91	Teague & Millsap (16)	Carroll, Korver, Brand (7)	Kyle Korver (6)	Barclays Center; 15,326	18–17
36	January 8	Indiana	W 97–87	Kyle Korver (17)	Paul Millsap (6)	Jeff Teague (6)	Philips Arena; 15,169	19–17
37	January 10	Houston	W 83–80	Korver & Millsap (20)	Elton Brand (11)	Lou Williams (8)	Philips Arena; 13,115	20–17
38	January 12	@ Memphis	L 101–108	Paul Millsap (21)	Ayon & Korver (7)	Paul Millsap (6)	FedExForum; 16,841	20–18
39	January 16	Brooklyn	L 110–127	Mack & Scott (17)	Pero Antić (5)	Shelvin Mack (7)	The O2 Arena; 18,689	20–19
40	January 20	Miami	W 121–114	Paul Millsap (26)	Millsap & Korver (7)	Shelvin Mack (7)	Philips Arena; 19,262	21–19
41	January 22	@ Orlando	W 112–109	Paul Millsap (24)	Pero Antic (12)	Kyle Korver (7)	Amway Center	22–19
42	January 24	San Antonio	L 79–105	Paul Millsap (15)	Paul Millsap (8)	Lou Williams (7)	Philips Arena; 17,601	22–20
43	January 25	@ Milwaukee	W 112–87	Paul Millsap (20)	Paul Millsap (8)	Louis Williams (5)	BMO Harris Bradley Center	23–20
44	January 27	@ Oklahoma City	L 109–111	Paul Millsap (23)	Gustavo Ayón (10)	Shelvin Mack (7)	Chesapeake Energy Arena; 18,203	23–21
–	January 29	Detroit	Game postponed to April 8 due to severe weather conditions.					
45	January 31	@ Philadelphia	W 125–99	Scott & Brand (18)	Scott & Carroll (9)	Jeff Teague (8)	Wells Fargo Center; 14,702	24–21

February: 2–10 (home: 2–4; road: 0–6)

Game	Date	Team	Score	High points	High rebounds	High assists	Location Attendance	Record
46	February 1	Minnesota	W 120–113	Kyle Korver (24)	Paul Millsap (13)	Jeff Teague (8)	Philips Arena; 13,018	25–21
47	February 4	Indiana	L 85–89	Mike Scott (15)	Paul Millsap (12)	Jeff Teague (7)	Philips Arena; 15,374	25–22
48	February 5	@ New Orleans	L 100–105	Paul Millsap (26)	Paul Millsap (10)	Jeff Teague (13)	New Orleans Arena; 16,232	25–23
49	February 8	Memphis	L 76–79	Paul Millsap (20)	Paul Millsap (11)	Paul Millsap (6)	Philips Arena; 15,190	25–24
50	February 11	@ Chicago	L 85–100	Paul Millsap (15)	Ayón & Brand (8)	Korver & Williams (4)	United Center; 21,325	25–25
51	February 12	@ Toronto	L 83–104	Gustavo Ayón (18)	Gustavo Ayón (10)	Jeff Teague (6)	Air Canada Centre; 17,121	25–26
All-Star Break
52	February 18	@ Indiana	L 98–108	Kyle Korver (19)	Millsap & Brand (8)	Shelvin Mack (8)	Bankers Life Fieldhouse; 18,165	25–27
53	February 19	Washington	L 97–114	Paul Millsap (21)	Millsap & Brand (11)	Jeff Teague (5)	Philips Arena; 13,529	25–28
54	February 21	@ Detroit	L 107–115	Paul Millsap (23)	Elton Brand (9)	Lou Williams (8)	Palace of Auburn Hills; 18,053	25–29
55	February 22	New York	W 107–98	Mike Scott (30)	Lou Williams (9)	Lou Williams (7)	Philips Arena; 19,045	26–29
56	February 25	Chicago	L 103–107	Jeff Teague (26)	Elton Brand (13)	Jeff Teague (7)	Philips Arena; 12,418	26–30
57	February 26	@ Boston	L 104–115	Jeff Teague (26)	Brand & Carroll (7)	Shelvin Mack (8)	TD Garden; 16,605	26–31

March : 6–10 (home: 4–3; road: 2–7)

Game	Date	Team	Score	High points	High rebounds	High assists	Location Attendance	Record
58	March 2	@ Phoenix	L 120–129	Jeff Teague (29)	Teague, Brand & Carroll (6)	Jeff Teague (9)	US Airways Center; 16,759	26–32
59	March 5	@ Portland	L 78–102	Cartier Martin (16)	Martin & Carroll (6)	Shelvin Mack (7)	Moda Center; 20,043	26–33
60	March 7	@ Golden State	L 97–111	Paul Millsap (16)	Paul Millsap (7)	Jeff Teague (6)	Oracle Arena; 19,596	26–34
61	March 8	@ L.A. Clippers	L 105–107	DeMarre Carroll (19)	Pero Antic (6)	Jeff Teague (9)	Staples Center; 19,178	26–35
62	March 10	@ Utah	W 112–110	Kyle Korver (26)	Paul Millsap (8)	Teague & Mack (6)	EnergySolutions Arena; 17,774	27–35
63	March 13	Milwaukee	W 102–97	Jeff Teague (22)	Paul Millsap (8)	Jeff Teague (8)	Philips Arena; 12,554	28–35
64	March 15	Denver	W 97–92	Paul Millsap (24)	Paul Millsap (11)	Jeff Teague (10)	Philips Arena; 16,921	29–35
65	March 17	@ Charlotte	W 97–83	Paul Millsap (28)	Pero Antic (10)	Jeff Teague (9)	Time Warner Cable Arena; 14,419	30–35
66	March 18	Toronto	W 118–113 (OT)	Jeff Teague (34)	Paul Millsap (13)	Paul Millsap (10)	Philips Arena; 11,759	31–35
67	March 21	New Orleans	L 105–111	Jeff Teague (26)	DeMarre Carroll (7)	Jeff Teague (8)	Philips Arena; 15,476	31–36
68	March 23	@ Toronto	L 86–96	Millsap & Carroll (17)	Pero Antic (10)	Jeff Teague (5)	Air Canada Centre; 18,140	31–37
69	March 24	Phoenix	L 95–102	Millsap & Carroll (19)	Pero Antic (8)	Shelvin Mack (6)	Philips Arena; 12,240	31–38
70	March 26	@ Minnesota	L 83–107	Mike Scott (15)	Paul Millsap (10)	Teague & Williams (6)	Target Center; 11,632	31–39
71	March 27	Portland	L 85–100	Jeff Teague (22)	Elton Brand (12)	Williams & Mack (4)	Philips Arena; 13,228	31–40
72	March 29	@ Washington	L 97–101	Jeff Teague (19)	Pero Antic (12)	Shelvin Mack (6)	Verizon Center; 17,996	31–41
73	March 31	Philadelphia	W 103–95	Paul Millsap (28)	Paul Millsap (17)	Teague & Williams (5)	Philips Arena; 11,096	32–41

April : 6–3 (home: 3–3; road: 3–0)

Game	Date	Team	Score	High points	High rebounds	High assists	Location Attendance	Record
74	April 2	Chicago	L 92–105	Paul Millsap (22)	Paul Millsap (11)	Jeff Teague (8)	Philips Arena; 17,029	32–42
75	April 4	Cleveland	W 117–98	Mike Scott (26)	Paul Millsap (11)	Jeff Teague (12)	Philips Arena; 16,210	33–42
76	April 6	@ Indiana	W 107–88	Jeff Teague (25)	Paul Millsap (11)	Shelvin Mack (7)	Bankers Life Fieldhouse; 18,165	34–42
77	April 8	Detroit	L 95–102	Paul Millsap (24)	Paul Millsap (12)	Jeff Teague (9)	Philips Arena; 10,587	34–43
78	April 9	Boston	W 105–97	Jeff Teague (19)	Paul Millsap (14)	Jeff Teague (8)	Philips Arena; 13,868	35–43
79	April 11	@ Brooklyn	W 93–88	Paul Millsap (27)	DeMarre Carroll (11)	Dennis Schröder (4)	Barclays Center; 17,732	36–43
80	April 12	Miami	W 98–85	Jeff Teague (25)	Paul Millsap (8)	Paul Millsap (5)	Philips Arena; 19,287	37–43
81	April 14	Charlotte	L 93–95	Mike Scott (20)	Elton Brand (7)	Williams & Schröder (6)	Philips Arena; 11,918	37–44
82	April 16	@ Milwaukee	W 111–103	Mike Scott (17)	Cartier Martin (6)	Scott, Carroll, & Korver (4)	BMO Harris Bradley Center; 13,111	38–44

2013–14 season schedule

=== Standings ===
Southeast Division	W	L	PCT	GB	Home	Road	Div	GP
y-Miami Heat	54	28	.659	–	32‍–‍9	22‍–‍19	12–4	82
x-Washington Wizards	44	38	.537	10.0	22‍–‍19	22‍–‍19	10–6	82
x-Charlotte Bobcats	43	39	.524	11.0	25‍–‍16	18‍–‍23	6–10	82
x-Atlanta Hawks	38	44	.463	16.0	24‍–‍17	14‍–‍27	8–8	82
Orlando Magic	23	59	.280	31.0	19‍–‍22	4‍–‍37	4–12	82

Eastern Conference
#	Team	W	L	PCT	GB	GP
1	c-Indiana Pacers *	56	26	.683	–	82
2	y-Miami Heat *	54	28	.659	2.0	82
3	y-Toronto Raptors *	48	34	.585	8.0	82
4	x-Chicago Bulls	48	34	.585	8.0	82
5	x-Washington Wizards	44	38	.537	12.0	82
6	x-Brooklyn Nets	44	38	.537	12.0	82
7	x-Charlotte Bobcats	43	39	.524	13.0	82
8	x-Atlanta Hawks	38	44	.463	18.0	82
9	New York Knicks	37	45	.451	19.0	82
10	Cleveland Cavaliers	33	49	.402	23.0	82
11	Detroit Pistons	29	53	.354	27.0	82
12	Boston Celtics	25	57	.305	31.0	82
13	Orlando Magic	23	59	.280	33.0	82
14	Philadelphia 76ers	19	63	.232	37.0	82
15	Milwaukee Bucks	15	67	.183	41.0	82

== Playoffs ==
=== Game log ===
2014 playoff game log
First Round: 3–4 (home: 1–2; road: 2–2)

Game	Date	Team	Score	High points	High rebounds	High assists	Location Attendance	Series
1	April 19	@ Indiana	W 101–93	Jeff Teague (28)	DeMarre Carroll (10)	Jeff Teague (5)	Bankers Life Fieldhouse; 18,165	1–0
2	April 22	@ Indiana	L 85–101	Paul Millsap (19)	Elton Brand (7)	Jeff Teague (4)	Bankers Life Fieldhouse; 18,165	1–1
3	April 24	Indiana	W 98–85	Jeff Teague (22)	Paul Millsap (14)	Jeff Teague (10)	Philips Arena; 18,124	2–1
4	April 26	Indiana	L 88–91	Paul Millsap (29)	Kyle Korver (9)	Jeff Teague (7)	Philips Arena; 19,043	2–2
5	April 28	@ Indiana	W 107–97	Shelvin Mack (20)	Kyle Korver (9)	Shelvin Mack (5)	Bankers Life Fieldhouse; 18,165	3–2
6	May 1	Indiana	L 88–95	Jeff Teague (29)	Paul Millsap (18)	Paul Millsap (5)	Philips Arena; 19,044	3–3
7	May 3	@ Indiana	L 80–92	Kyle Korver (19)	Paul Millsap (17)	Shelvin Mack (7)	Bankers Life Fieldhouse; 18,165	3–4

2014 playoff schedule

== Player statistics ==
Legend
GP	Games played	GS	Games started	MPG	Minutes per game
FG%	Field-goal percentage	3P%	3-point field-goal percentage	FT%	Free-throw percentage
RPG	Rebounds per game	APG	Assists per game	SPG	Steals per game
BPG	Blocks per game	PPG	Points per game

=== Regular season ===
Player	GP	GS	MPG	FG%	3P%	FT%	RPG	APG	SPG	BPG	PPG
Mike Scott	80	6	18.5	.479	.310	.780	3.6	.9	.4	.1	9.6
Jeff Teague	79	79	32.2	.438	.329	.846	2.6	6.7	1.1	.2	16.5
Paul Millsap	74	73	33.5	.461	.358	.731	8.5	3.1	1.7	1.1	17.9
DeMarre Carroll	73	73	32.1	.470	.362	.773	5.5	1.8	1.5	.3	11.1
Elton Brand	73	15	19.4	.539	.000	.649	4.9	1.0	.5	1.2	5.7
Shelvin Mack	73	11	20.4	.417	.337	.865	2.2	3.7	.7	.0	7.5
Kyle Korver	71	71	33.9	.475	.472	.926	4.0	2.9	1.0	.3	12.0
Lou Williams	60	7	24.1	.400	.342	.849	2.1	3.5	.8	.1	10.4
Cartier Martin^{†}	53	6	15.5	.414	.384	.754	2.0	.6	.5	.1	5.9
Pero Antić	50	26	18.5	.418	.327	.758	4.2	1.2	.4	.2	7.0
Dennis Schröder	49	0	13.1	.383	.238	.674	1.2	1.9	.3	.0	3.7
Al Horford	29	29	33.0	.567	.364	.682	8.4	2.6	.9	1.5	18.6
Gustavo Ayón	26	14	16.5	.510		.400	4.8	1.1	1.0	.4	4.3
Mike Muscala	20	0	10.8	.425	.000	1.000	2.6	.4	.2	.5	3.8
John Jenkins	13	0	12.2	.381	.222	1.000	1.7	.8	.1	.1	3.1
Jared Cunningham^{†}	5	0	4.4	.500	.000	.000	.2	.6	.0	.0	.4
James Nunnally^{†}	4	0	13.5	.333	.300	.750	2.0	.5	.3	.3	4.5
Dexter Pittman	2	0	1.5	.000		.000	1.5	.0	.0	.0	.0

=== Playoffs ===
Player	GP	GS	MPG	FG%	3P%	FT%	RPG	APG	SPG	BPG	PPG
Paul Millsap	7	7	38.1	.398	.333	.804	10.9	2.9	1.4	1.9	19.4
Kyle Korver	7	7	35.7	.455	.426	.917	5.3	.7	.6	.3	13.4
DeMarre Carroll	7	7	35.1	.469	.409	.636	4.9	1.6	.7	.4	8.9
Jeff Teague	7	7	34.6	.393	.333	.950	3.7	5.0	1.0	.6	19.3
Pero Antić	7	7	24.3	.167	.120	.625	3.9	.7	.7	.4	3.1
Mike Scott	7	0	20.9	.365	.323	.714	2.6	.4	.1	.0	9.4
Lou Williams	7	0	19.0	.380	.313	.938	2.3	1.1	1.0	.1	8.3
Shelvin Mack	7	0	16.9	.404	.370	.750	1.9	3.6	.6	.0	8.1
Elton Brand	7	0	11.6	.167		.800	3.3	.9	.1	.9	1.1
Cartier Martin	3	0	5.0	.667			1.0	.0	.7	.0	1.3
Dennis Schröder	2	0	3.5	1.000	1.000		1.0	.0	.0	.0	2.5
Mike Muscala	2	0	2.5	.000			.0	.0	.0	.0	.0

- ^{†} Denotes player spent time with another team in the season. Stats reflect time with the Hawks only.

== See also ==
- 2013–14 NBA season
