= Paul Millsap =

American basketball player (born 1985)

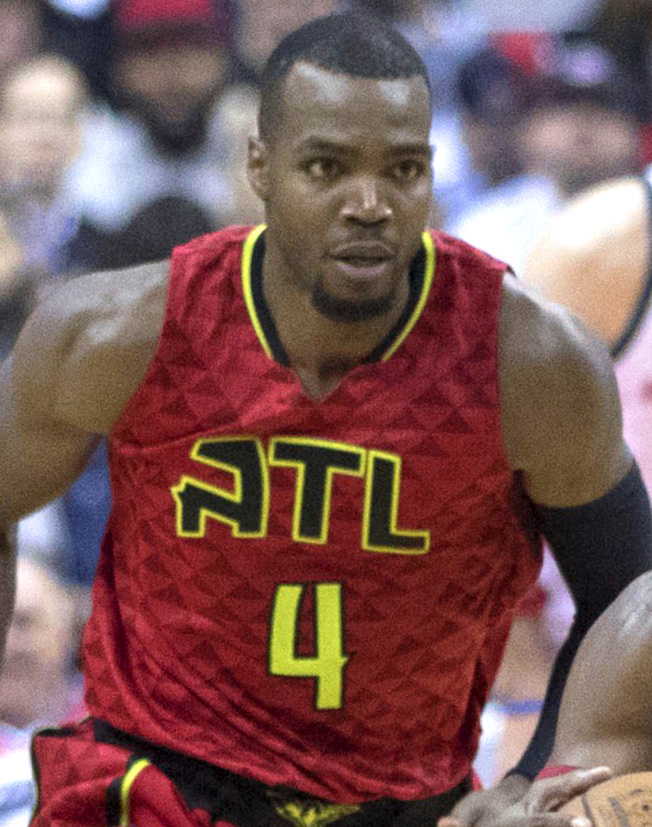
- Millsap with the Atlanta Hawks in 2017

Personal information
- Born: February 10, 1985 (age 41) Monroe, Louisiana, U.S.
- Listed height: 6 ft 7 in (2.01 m)
- Listed weight: 257 lb (117 kg)

Career information
- High school: Grambling (Grambling, Louisiana)
- College: Louisiana Tech (2003–2006)
- NBA draft: 2006: 2nd round, 47th overall pick
- Drafted by: Utah Jazz
- Playing career: 2006–2022
- Position: Power forward
- Number: 24, 4, 31, 8

Career history
- 2006–2013: Utah Jazz
- 2013–2017: Atlanta Hawks
- 2017–2021: Denver Nuggets
- 2021–2022: Brooklyn Nets
- 2022: Philadelphia 76ers

Career highlights
- 4× NBA All-Star (2014–2017); NBA All-Defensive Second Team (2016); NBA All-Rookie Second Team (2007); 3× NCAA rebounding leader (2004–2006); 2× First-team All-WAC (2005, 2006); Second-team All-WAC (2004); WAC Rookie of the Year (2004); Fourth-team Parade All-American (2003); Louisiana Mr. Basketball (2003); No. 24 retired by Louisiana Tech Bulldogs

Career NBA statistics
- Points: 14,536 (13.4 ppg)
- Rebounds: 7,673 (7.1 rpg)
- Assists: 2,378 (2.2 apg)
- Stats at NBA.com
- Stats at Basketball Reference

Paul Millsap (born February 10, 1985) is an American former professional basketball player who played for 16 seasons in the National Basketball Association (NBA). A power forward from Louisiana Tech University, Millsap was selected by the Utah Jazz in the second round (47th pick overall) of the 2006 NBA draft and was named to the NBA All-Rookie Second Team. He played in Utah until 2013, when he became a member of the Atlanta Hawks. Millsap has also played for the Denver Nuggets, Brooklyn Nets, and Philadelphia 76ers. He is a four-time NBA All-Star.

== High school career ==
Millsap attended Grambling High School, in Grambling, Louisiana, where he played for the Grambling Kittens high school basketball team. The 2003 Louisiana "Mr. Basketball", he was named a fourth-team Parade All-American and was ranked no. 58 nationally by ESPN.

== College career ==
In his three-year career at Louisiana Tech, Millsap averaged 18.6 points, 12.7 rebounds and 2.0 blocks in 92 games. After becoming the first player to lead NCAA Division I in rebounds in their freshman and sophomore years in 2005, he became the only player in NCAA basketball history with three consecutive seasons leading Division I in rebounding. As a freshman, Millsap was the WAC Rookie of the Year and was a second-team all-WAC honoree. As a sophomore and junior he was a first-team All-WAC honoree. As a junior in 2005–06, Millsap was also a WAC All-Defensive honoree and a finalist for the Oscar Robertson Award. Following the season, he declared for the NBA draft on April 4, 2006.

== Professional career ==
=== Utah Jazz (2006–2013) ===
Millsap was selected by the Utah Jazz with the 47th overall pick in the 2006 NBA draft, and later signed his rookie scale contract with the Jazz on August 2, 2006. In late 2006, some sports journalists were referring to Millsap as a potential Rookie of the Year candidate, an award not traditionally given to players taken so late in the draft. Though the award ultimately went to Brandon Roy, Millsap had a strong first season, leading all rookies with six double-doubles. He finished the 2006–07 season with averages of around 7 points per game, 5 rebounds per game, nearly one steal and one block; he had season highs of 20 points, 17 rebounds, 4 blocks, 4 steals, 3 assists, and 38 minutes. He played in all 82 of Utah's games. As a solid bench player, the rookie participated in a surprising run to the Conference Finals where his Utah Jazz lost to later NBA champions San Antonio Spurs.

Early in the 2007–08 season, Millsap achieved a new career high of 24 points during a win over the Cleveland Cavaliers. He later extended his career high to 28 points against the Orlando Magic in late December 2007. His next career high came in December 2008 against the Boston Celtics when he scored 32 points. Millsap had played in 194 straight games since being drafted by the Jazz in 2006; he missed his first game of his professional career on December 26, 2008, against the Dallas Mavericks due to a sprained posterior cruciate ligament injury in his knee suffered against the Milwaukee Bucks three days prior.

During the 2008–09 season, Millsap became the replacement for Carlos Boozer after the All-Star forward suffered multiple injuries. Millsap's numbers subsequently soared, as he averaged 15.9 points and 10.3 rebounds over 38 starts mid-season.

On June 25, 2009, the Jazz tendered a qualifying offer to Millsap, making him a restricted free agent. A few weeks later, on July 10, 2009, he signed an offer sheet from the Portland Trail Blazers for $32 million over four years, including $6.2 million in the 2009–10 season, with a $5.6 million signing bonus, with $10.3 million to be paid within seven days of the contract's approval by the NBA. The Jazz had the right to match the offer, and did so seven days later, on July 17, 2009.

Millsap became Utah's permanent starting power forward in 2010–11 after Boozer joined the Chicago Bulls. Millsap started alongside newly acquired center Al Jefferson. On November 9, 2010, Millsap scored a career-high 46 points in a 116–114 overtime win over the Miami Heat outscoring the entire Heat newly formed Big 3. Millsap scored 11 points in 28 seconds at the end of regulation, including three three-pointers, one more than he had made in his entire career before then. He also hit a buzzer-beater to force overtime.

=== Atlanta Hawks (2013–2017) ===
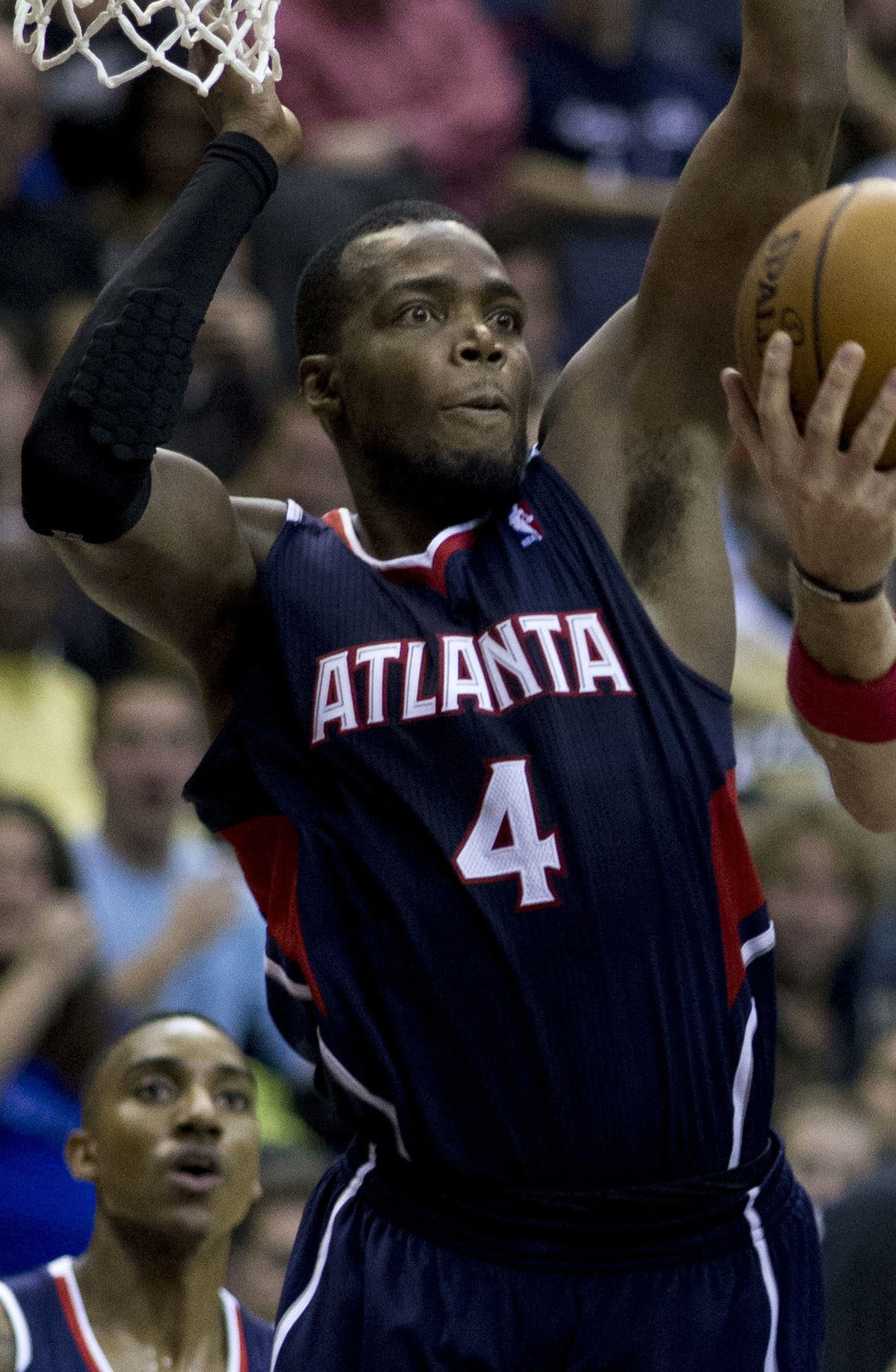
Millsap in 2013

On July 10, 2013, after spending the first seven years of his career with the Jazz, Millsap signed a two-year deal with the Atlanta Hawks. On January 30, 2014, Millsap was voted by the coaches to be a reserve on the 2014 East All-Star team. On March 18, 2014, Millsap recorded his first career triple-double with 19 points, 13 rebounds and 10 assists in a 118–113 overtime win over the Toronto Raptors.

On January 29, 2015, Millsap earned his second consecutive All-Star nod as a reserve for the Eastern Conference in the 2015 NBA All-Star Game. The Hawks sent four players to the All-Star game, all of whom were selected as reserves. He went on to help the Hawks finish with a 60–22 record in 2014–15, the team's best finish since 1993–94. They made it through to the Eastern Conference Finals where they were swept 4–0 by the Cleveland Cavaliers.

On July 9, 2015, Millsap re-signed with the Hawks to a three-year, $59 million contract. On January 16, 2016, he scored 21 points against the Brooklyn Nets to move past 10,000 for his career. On January 28, he earned his third consecutive All-Star nod as a reserve for the Eastern Conference in the 2016 NBA All-Star Game. On April 9, 2016, he recorded a season-high 31 points and 16 rebounds in a 118–107 win over the Boston Celtics. The Hawks finished the regular season as the fourth seed in the Eastern Conference with a 48–34 record. In the first round of the playoffs, the Hawks faced the fifth-seeded Boston Celtics, and in a Game 4 loss on April 24, Millsap scored 45 points—a career playoff high and one off his all-time best—and added 13 rebounds. The loss tied the series at 2–2. The Hawks went on to defeat the Celtics in six games and moved on to the semi-finals, where they were defeated in four games by the Cleveland Cavaliers.

In the Hawks' season opener on October 27, 2016, Millsap scored a game-high 28 points on 11-of-20 shooting in a 114–99 win over the Washington Wizards. On December 19, 2016, he scored a season-high 30 points, including the go-ahead 10-footer with 12.7 seconds left, to help the Hawks defeat the Oklahoma City Thunder 110–108. On January 1, 2017, he set a new season high with 32 points and had 13 rebounds in a 114–112 overtime win over the San Antonio Spurs, helping the Hawks snap a string of 11 straight losses to San Antonio since 2010. On January 26, he was named an Eastern Conference All-Star reserve for the 2017 NBA All-Star Game, earning his fourth straight All-Star nod. Three days later, he had a season-high 37 points, including the go-ahead layup with 27 seconds remaining in the fourth overtime, to lead the Hawks to a 142–139 win over the New York Knicks. He also had 19 rebounds, setting another season high, and seven assists.

=== Denver Nuggets (2017–2021) ===
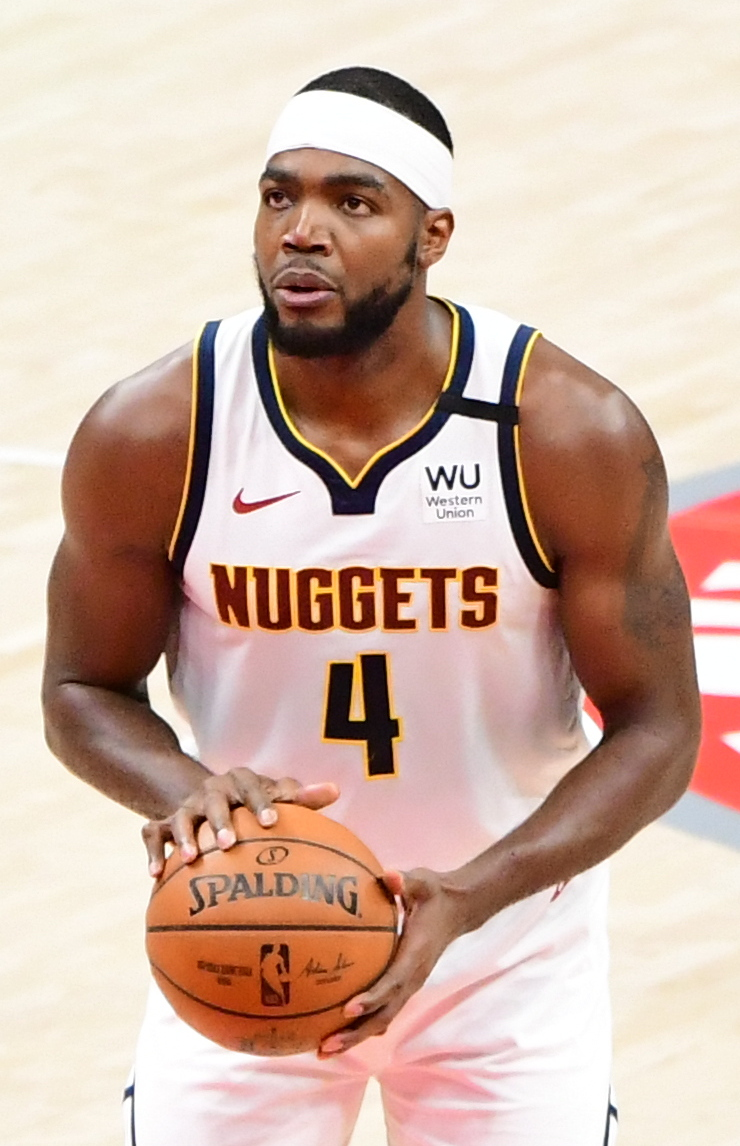
Millsap with the Nuggets in 2020

On July 13, 2017, Millsap signed a three-year, $90 million contract with the Denver Nuggets. In his debut for the Nuggets in their season opener on October 18, 2017, Millsap scored 19 points in a 106–96 loss to his former team, the Utah Jazz. On November 21, 2017, he was ruled out indefinitely after sustaining a left wrist injury. Five days later, he underwent successful reconstructive surgery on his left wrist, ruling him out for several months. He returned to action on February 27, 2018, against the Los Angeles Clippers, recording nine points and seven rebounds in 23½ minutes in a 122–120 loss. On March 30, 2018, he scored a season-high 36 points to help the Nuggets beat the Oklahoma City Thunder 126–125 in overtime.

On December 3, 2018, Millsap was named Western Conference Player of the Week for games played from November 26 to December 2. It was his third career Player of the Week award, and he became the 18th Nuggets player in franchise history to win the award. Four days later against the Charlotte Hornets, Millsap suffered a broken toe in his right foot. He subsequently missed eight games. On February 13, 2019, he matched a season high with 25 points in a 120–118 win over the Sacramento Kings. On March 14, he set a new season high with 33 points in a 100–99 win over the Dallas Mavericks. For the 2019–20 season, Millsap continued to retain his spot in the starting five.

As players were allowed the option to have a meaningful statement of their choice displayed on the backside of their jersey in support of the Black Lives Matter movement in the isolated NBA Bubble, Millsap chose to have "Vote" as his statement, which due to his jersey number 4, ironically appeared as "Vote 4 Millsap", a pun that quickly caught viral attention. Although his production slightly declined during the playoffs, he kept his starting spot in Denver. With the Nuggets, he reached the Conference Finals for the third time in his career, ultimately losing to eventual NBA champions Los Angeles Lakers.

On December 3, 2020, Millsap re-signed with the Nuggets on a reported one-year deal worth $10 million.

=== Brooklyn Nets (2021–2022) ===
On September 10, 2021, Millsap signed with the Brooklyn Nets.

=== Philadelphia 76ers (2022) ===
On February 10, 2022, Millsap was traded along with James Harden to the Philadelphia 76ers in exchange for Ben Simmons, Seth Curry, Andre Drummond, and two first-round draft selections.

In the remaining 28 games that the 76ers had in the regular season, Millsap would suit up in 9 of them, averaging 3.7 points and 2.8 rebounds in 11.8 minutes per game.

Millsap's final NBA game was Game 1 of the 2022 Eastern Conference Semifinals on May 2, 2022. In his final game, Millsap played for 5 and half minutes and recorded 1 rebound and 1 assist as the 76ers fell to the Miami Heat 106–92.

=== Retirement ===
Millsap did not play during the 2022–23 or 2023–24 NBA seasons and subsequently announced his retirement from the league on December 3, 2024. He retired as one of the eight players in NBA history with 500 3-pointers, 1,000 blocks and 1,000 steals.

== Personal life ==
Millsap's brother, Elijah, is a professional basketball player who played for the Utah Jazz. His eldest brother, John, played for the UTSA Roadrunners.

== Awards and honors ==
- Louisiana Mr. Basketball: 2003
- Louisiana Tech University Athletic Hall of Fame: 2011
- 4× NBA All-Star (2014–2017)
- NBA All-Defensive Second Team (2016)
- NBA All-Rookie Second Team (2007)

== NBA career statistics ==
Legend
GP	Games played	GS	Games started	MPG	Minutes per game
FG%	Field goal percentage	3P%	3-point field goal percentage	FT%	Free throw percentage
RPG	Rebounds per game	APG	Assists per game	SPG	Steals per game
BPG	Blocks per game	PPG	Points per game	**Bold**	Career high
*	Led the league

=== Regular season ===
Year	Team	GP	GS	MPG	FG%	3P%	FT%	RPG	APG	SPG	BPG	PPG
2006–07	Utah	**82***	1	18.0	.525	.333	.673	5.2	.8	.8	.9	6.8
2007–08	Utah	**82***	2	20.8	.504	.000	.677	5.6	1.0	.9	.9	8.1
2008–09	Utah	76	38	30.1	**.538**	.000	.699	8.6	1.8	1.0	1.0	13.5
2009–10	Utah	**82***	8	27.8	**.538**	.111	.693	6.8	1.6	.8	1.2	11.6
2010–11	Utah	76	76	**34.3**	.531	.391	.757	7.6	2.5	1.4	.9	17.3
2011–12	Utah	64	62	32.8	.495	.226	.792	8.8	2.3	**1.8**	.8	16.6
2012–13	Utah	78	78	30.4	.490	.333	.742	7.1	2.6	1.3	1.0	14.6
2013–14	Atlanta	74	73	33.5	.461	.358	.731	8.5	3.1	1.7	1.1	17.9
2014–15	Atlanta	73	73	32.7	.476	.356	.757	7.8	3.1	**1.8**	.9	16.7
2015–16	Atlanta	81	**81**	32.7	.470	.319	.757	**9.0**	3.3	**1.8**	**1.7**	17.1
2016–17	Atlanta	69	67	34.0	.442	.311	.768	7.7	**3.7**	1.3	.9	**18.1**
2017–18	Denver	38	37	30.1	.464	.345	.696	6.4	2.8	1.0	1.2	14.6
2018–19	Denver	70	65	27.1	.484	.365	.727	7.2	2.0	1.2	.8	12.6
2019–20	Denver	51	48	24.3	.482	**.435**	**.816**	5.7	1.6	.9	.6	11.6
2020–21	Denver	56	36	20.8	.476	.343	.724	4.7	1.8	.9	.6	9.0
2021–22	Brooklyn	24	0	11.3	.376	.222	.706	3.7	1.0	.2	.5	3.4
2021–22	Philadelphia	9	1	11.8	.433	.250	.714	2.8	.6	.6	.2	3.7
Career		1,085	746	28.1	.489	.341	.736	7.1	2.2	1.2	1.0	13.4
All-Star		4	0	15.8	.381	.300	.000	4.3	2.0	.8	.0	4.8

=== Playoffs ===
Year	Team	GP	GS	MPG	FG%	3P%	FT%	RPG	APG	SPG	BPG	PPG
2007	Utah	17	0	15.5	.525	.000	.667	4.4	.5	.6	.5	5.9
2008	Utah	12	0	17.5	.516	.000	.520	3.9	.3	.6	1.3	6.4
2009	Utah	5	0	31.0	.510	—	.500	8.0	1.6	.8	1.0	11.8
2010	Utah	10	0	32.3	**.574**	.000	.690	8.8	2.2	1.1	1.4	18.0
2012	Utah	4	4	34.8	.370	.000	.500	**11.0**	.5	.3	**2.5**	12.0
2014	Atlanta	7	7	**38.1**	.398	.333	.804	10.9	2.9	1.4	1.9	19.4
2015	Atlanta	16	15	35.4	.407	.306	.744	8.7	3.4	1.6	.9	15.2
2016	Atlanta	10	10	36.5	.431	.242	.745	9.4	2.7	1.3	2.3	16.7
2017	Atlanta	6	6	36.6	.505	.176	**.811**	8.3	**4.3**	**1.7**	.7	**24.3**
2019	Denver	14	14	33.5	.468	.316	.770	6.7	.8	.9	1.1	14.6
2020	Denver	**19**	**19**	24.2	.398	**.341**	.796	4.7	1.2	.6	.5	8.0
2021	Denver	9	0	12.1	.440	.261	.615	3.9	1.7	.3	.9	6.4
2022	Philadelphia	1	0	6.0	—	—	—	1.0	1.0	.0	.0	.0
Career		130	75	27.3	.456	.286	.726	6.8	1.7	.9	1.1	12.1

== See also ==
- List of NCAA Division I men's basketball season rebounding leaders
