= DeMarre Carroll =

American basketball player (born 1986)

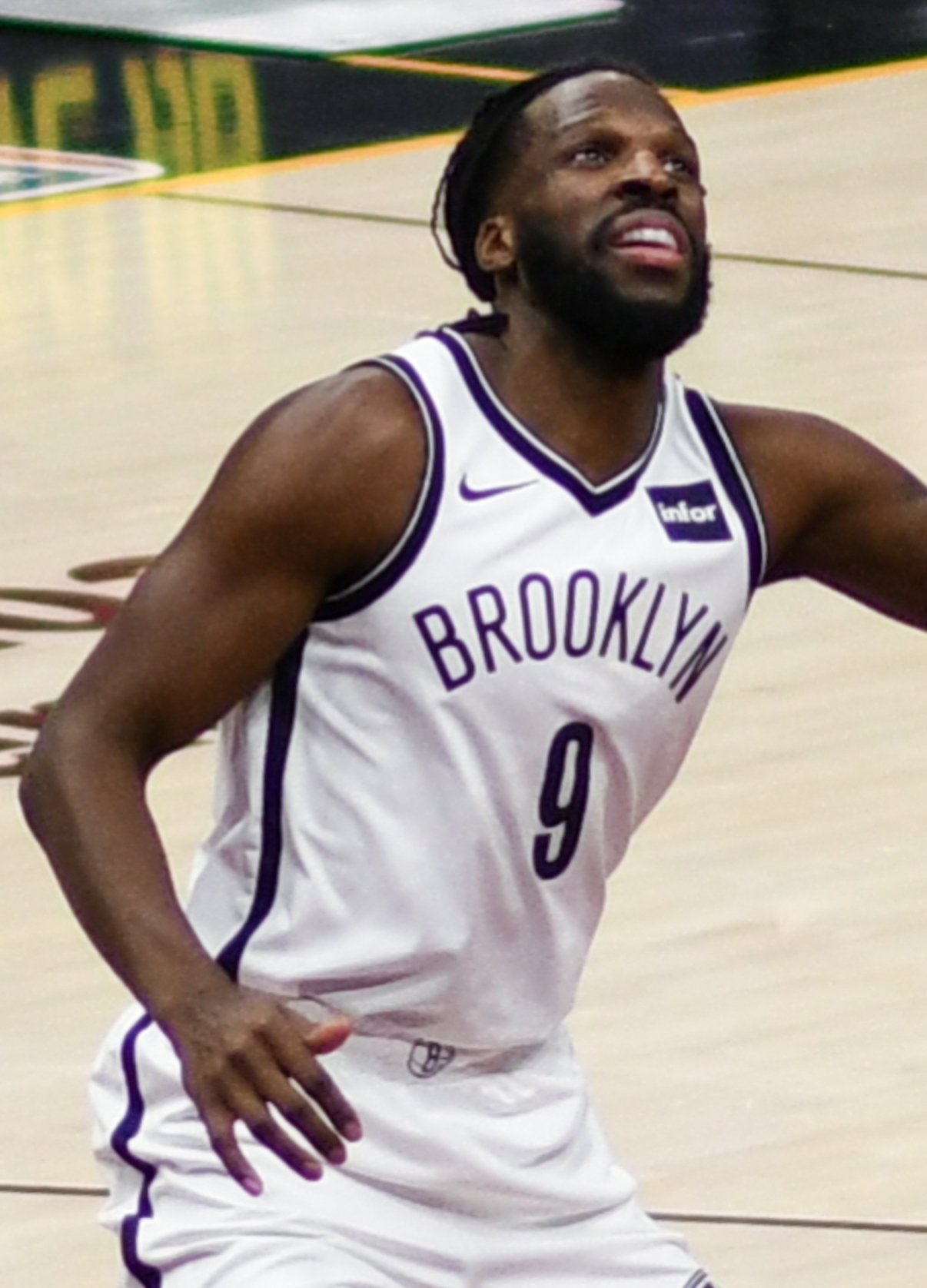
- Carroll with the Brooklyn Nets in 2018

Phoenix Suns
- Title: Assistant coach
- League: NBA

Personal information
- Born: July 27, 1986 (age 40) Birmingham, Alabama, U.S.
- Listed height: 6 ft 6 in (1.98 m)
- Listed weight: 215 lb (98 kg)

Career information
- High school: Minor (Adamsville, Alabama); John Carroll Catholic (Birmingham, Alabama)
- College: Vanderbilt (2004–2006); Missouri (2007–2009)
- NBA draft: 2009: 1st round, 27th overall pick
- Drafted by: Memphis Grizzlies
- Playing career: 2009–2020
- Position: Small forward
- Number: 1, 0, 3, 5, 9, 77
- Coaching career: 2022–present

Career history

Playing
- 2009–2011: Memphis Grizzlies
- 2010–2011: →Dakota Wizards
- 2011: Houston Rockets
- 2011–2012: Denver Nuggets
- 2012–2013: Utah Jazz
- 2013–2015: Atlanta Hawks
- 2015–2017: Toronto Raptors
- 2017–2019: Brooklyn Nets
- 2019–2020: San Antonio Spurs
- 2020: Houston Rockets

Coaching
- 2022–2023: Milwaukee Bucks (assistant)
- 2023–2024: Los Angeles Lakers (assistant)
- 2024–2025: Cleveland Cavaliers (assistant)
- 2025–present: Phoenix Suns (assistant)

Career highlights
- As player: First-team All-Big 12 (2009); As assistant coach: NBA Cup champion (2023)
- Stats at NBA.com
- Stats at Basketball Reference

DeMarre LaEdrick Carroll (born July 27, 1986) is an American professional basketball coach and former player who is an assistant coach for the Phoenix Suns of the National Basketball Association (NBA). He was selected as the 27th overall pick by the Memphis Grizzlies in the 2009 NBA draft. Carroll played in the NBA for 11 seasons with the Grizzlies, Houston Rockets, Denver Nuggets, Utah Jazz, Atlanta Hawks, Toronto Raptors, Brooklyn Nets and San Antonio Spurs. He played college basketball for the Vanderbilt Commodores and Missouri Tigers.

== Early life ==
Carroll was born to parents Ed, a pharmacist and minister, and Cynthia Carroll. He was raised in Forestdale, Alabama. Carroll credits his inspiration to play basketball as his older brother DeLonte who died of a brain tumor at the age of nine.

Carroll attended Minor High School in Adamsville until he transferred to John Carroll Catholic High School in Birmingham prior to the start of the 2002–03 season. He partnered with Alabama point guard Ronald Steele at John Carroll Catholic to lead the Cavaliers to back-to-back Alabama Class 6A state titles. He earned first team All-State, All-Area, All-Region, All-District and All-Metro recognition as a junior and senior and helped JCCHS to a combined 67–3 mark his final two seasons, culminating in those consecutive state crowns. He averaged 17.8 points and 9.1 rebounds as a junior for John Carroll's undefeated 36–0 state championship squad, before recording averages of 19.7 points and 10.7 rebounds as a senior en route to the team's 31–3 championship season. He capped his prep career by scoring a game-high 27 points in the annual Alabama-Mississippi All-Star Game and was named MVP of the 2004 Alabama Class 6A State Tournament.

Considered a three-star recruit by Rivals.com, Carroll was listed as the No. 40 small forward and the No. 148 player in the nation in 2004.

== College career ==
After a successful sophomore year at Vanderbilt, he surprised the team when he decided to transfer to Missouri in 2006 to play for his uncle Mike Anderson. Carroll helped lead Missouri to the Elite Eight (national quarterfinals) of the 2009 NCAA Division I men's basketball tournament during his senior year. He was nicknamed the "Junkyard Dog" because of his toughness and relentless play.

=== Health issues ===
When Carroll came to Missouri, he complained of itchy legs, and was convinced that he was suffering from an allergy. After he was examined by several specialists, they came up with a considerably more serious diagnosis—liver disease. It was ultimately determined that Carroll would possibly need a liver transplant, but not for at least 20 years after his diagnosis and most likely after the end of any potential professional basketball career. His illness was revealed several weeks before the 2009 NBA draft. At 1:30 a.m. on July 5, 2007, Carroll was shot in the ankle during a domestic dispute at a nightclub in Columbia, Missouri.

== Professional career ==
=== Memphis Grizzlies (2009–2011) ===
Carroll was drafted in the first round, 27th overall, by the Memphis Grizzlies. He played primarily off the bench during his tenure with the Memphis Grizzlies. On December 14, 2010, he was assigned to the Dakota Wizards of the NBA D-League. He was recalled on January 5, 2011.

=== Houston Rockets (2011) ===
On February 24, 2011, Carroll was traded, along with Hasheem Thabeet and a future first-round draft pick, to the Houston Rockets in exchange for Shane Battier and Ish Smith. On April 11, 2011, he was waived by the Rockets.

=== Denver Nuggets (2011–2012) ===
On December 12, 2011, the Denver Nuggets made Carroll a non-guaranteed training camp invitee. He appeared in four games with the Nuggets during the 2011–12 regular season before being waived on February 4, 2012.

=== Utah Jazz (2012–2013) ===
On February 8, 2012, Carroll signed with the Utah Jazz.

=== Atlanta Hawks (2013–2015) ===
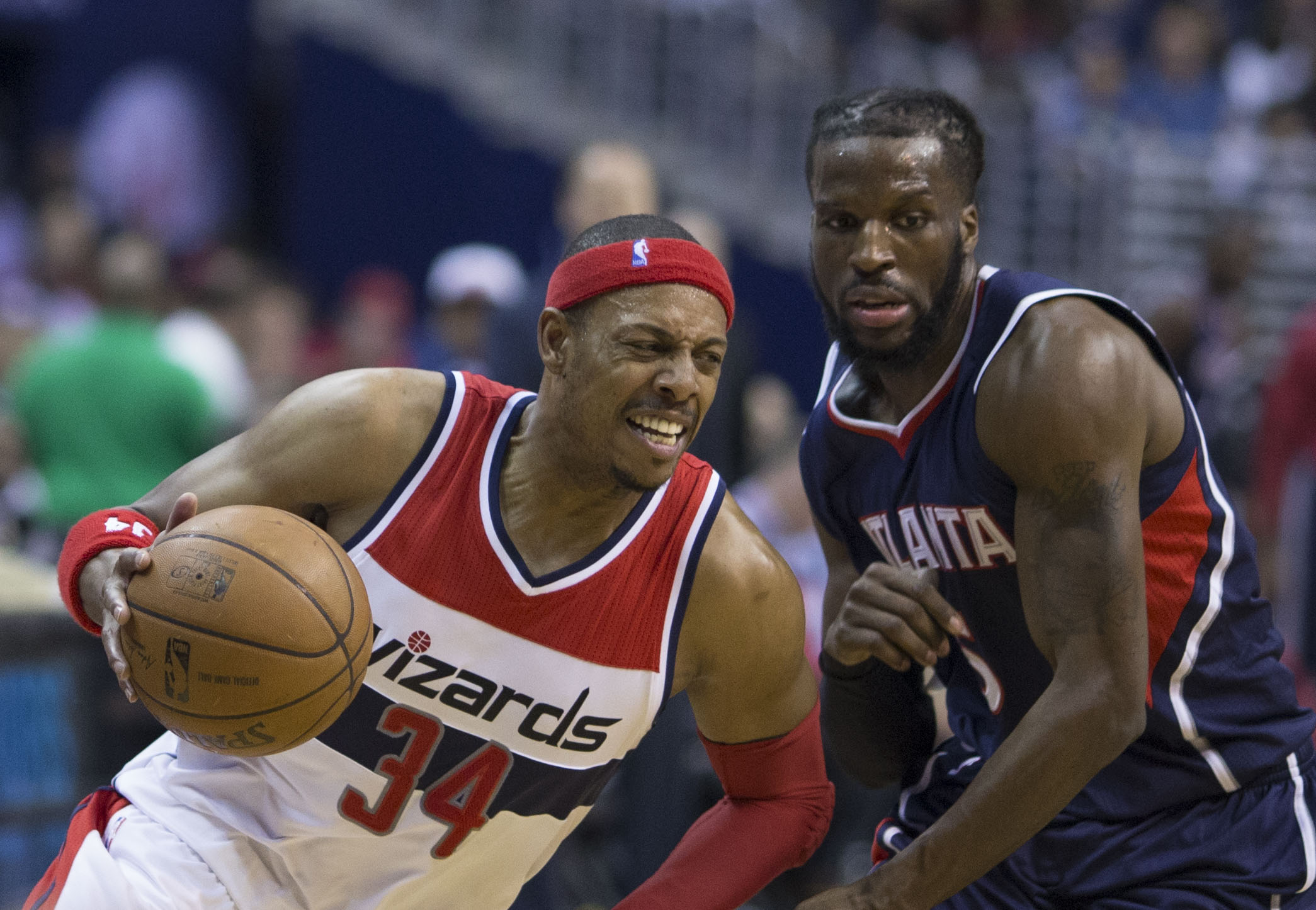
Carroll (right) with the Hawks in May 2015, defending Paul Pierce of the Washington Wizards

On August 3, 2013, Carroll signed with the Atlanta Hawks. On February 22, 2014, he scored a then career-high 24 points in the 107–98 win over the New York Knicks.

On December 23, 2014, Carroll scored a then career-high 25 points, while also grabbing a team-high 10 rebounds, in the 107–104 win over the Los Angeles Clippers. On February 4, 2015, he was part of the Hawks' starting line-up that were named the co-Kia Eastern Conference Players of the Month for January after the club compiled the first 17–0 record in a calendar month in league history. Five days later, he scored a career-high 26 points in the 117–105 win over the Minnesota Timberwolves.

=== Toronto Raptors (2015–2017) ===
On July 9, 2015, Carroll signed a four-year, $60 million contract with the Toronto Raptors. He made his debut for the Raptors in their season opener on October 28, 2015, recording 14 points and eight rebounds in a 106–99 win over the Indiana Pacers. On December 7, 2015, he was ruled out indefinitely with a bruised right knee. He returned to action on December 26 against the Milwaukee Bucks after missing nine straight games with the injury. He managed just five games before the same knee forced him to sit out the team's loss to the Cleveland Cavaliers on January 4, 2016. Two days later, he underwent surgery on his right knee. On April 7, 2016, he returned to action against the Atlanta Hawks after missing 41 games.

On January 8, 2017, Carroll tied a career high with 26 points and set a career high with six three-pointers on 10 attempts in a 129–122 loss to the Houston Rockets.

=== Brooklyn Nets (2017–2019) ===
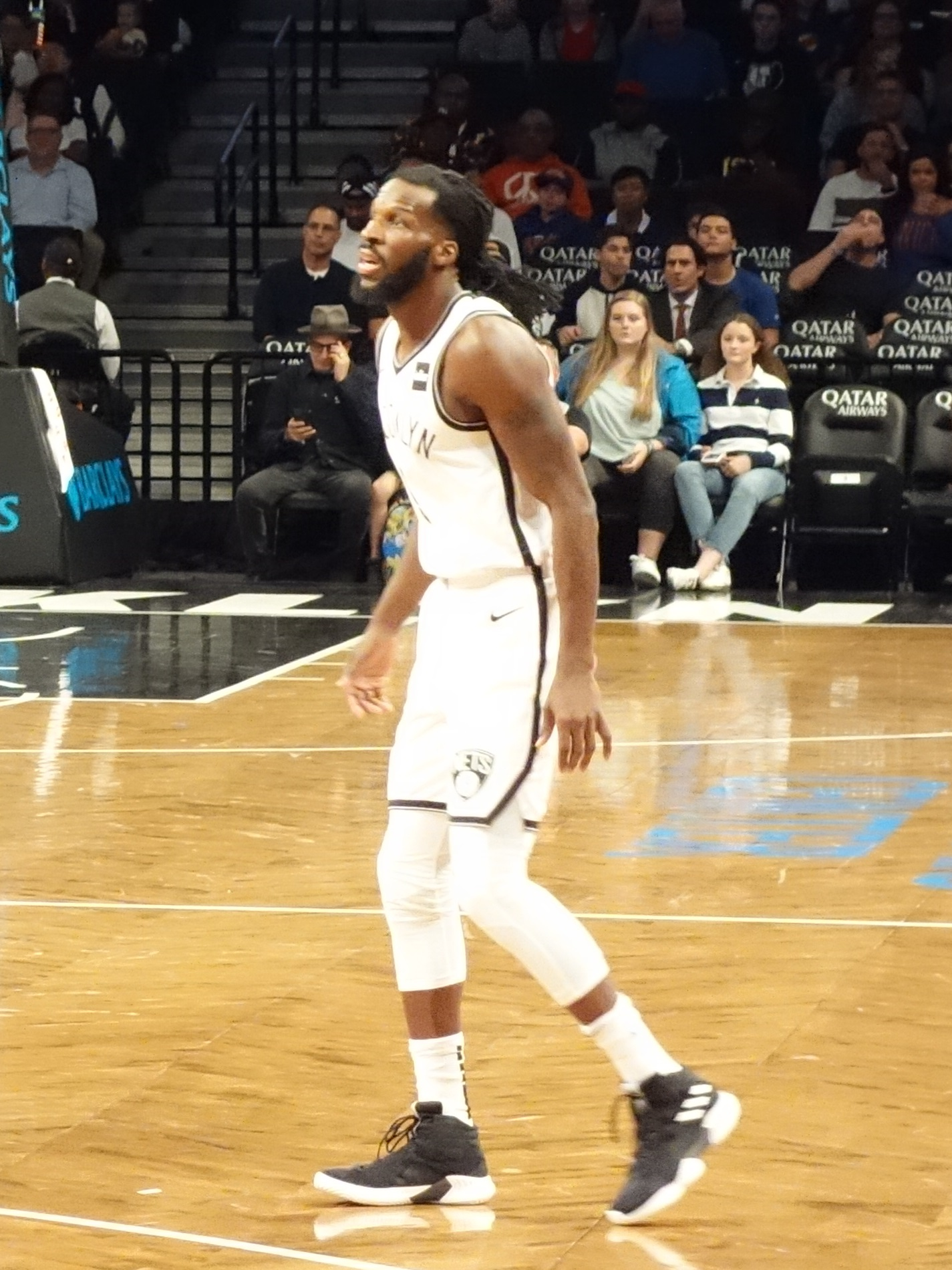
Carroll with the Brooklyn Nets in 2018

On July 13, 2017, Carroll was traded, along with 2018 first and second round draft picks, to the Brooklyn Nets in exchange for Justin Hamilton. In his debut for the Nets in their season opener on October 18, 2017, Carroll scored 10 points in a 140–131 loss to the Indiana Pacers. On November 26, 2017, he scored a season-high 24 points in a 98–88 win over the Memphis Grizzlies.

=== San Antonio Spurs (2019–2020) ===
On July 6, 2019, Carroll was traded to the San Antonio Spurs in a three-team trade.

=== Return to Houston (2020) ===
After getting waived by the Spurs, Carroll was signed by the Houston Rockets on February 21, 2020.

== Coaching career ==
On August 2, 2022, Carroll was announced as an assistant coach for the Milwaukee Bucks. He joined the staff of head coach Mike Budenholzer who Carroll played under on the Atlanta Hawks.

On July 4, 2023, Carroll was hired as an assistant coach by the Los Angeles Lakers.

On June 11, 2025, the Phoenix Suns hired Carroll to serve as an assistant coach under head coach Jordan Ott.

== NBA career statistics ==
Legend
GP	Games played	GS	Games started	MPG	Minutes per game
FG%	Field goal percentage	3P%	3-point field goal percentage	FT%	Free throw percentage
RPG	Rebounds per game	APG	Assists per game	SPG	Steals per game
BPG	Blocks per game	PPG	Points per game	**Bold**	Career high

=== Regular season ===
Year	Team	GP	GS	MPG	FG%	3P%	FT%	RPG	APG	SPG	BPG	PPG
2009–10	Memphis	71	1	11.2	.396	.000	.623	2.1	.5	.4	.1	2.9
2010–11	Memphis	7	0	5.6	.444	.000	**1.000**	1.1	.3	.1	.1	1.4
2010–11	Houston	5	0	2.2	.000	.000	.000	.0	.4	.0	.0	.0
2011–12	Denver	4	0	5.3	**1.000**	.000	.000	.8	.8	.0	.0	3.0
2011–12	Utah	20	9	16.4	.374	.368	.875	2.5	.8	.6	.1	4.8
2012–13	Utah	66	12	16.8	.460	.286	.765	2.8	.9	.9	**.4**	6.0
2013–14	Atlanta	**73**	**73**	**32.1**	.470	.362	.773	5.5	1.8	1.5	.3	11.1
2014–15	Atlanta	70	69	31.3	.487	**.395**	.702	5.3	1.7	1.3	.2	12.6
2015–16	Toronto	26	22	30.2	.389	.390	.600	4.7	1.0	**1.7**	.2	11.0
2016–17	Toronto	72	72	26.1	.401	.341	.761	3.8	1.0	1.1	**.4**	8.9
2017–18	Brooklyn	**73**	**73**	29.9	.414	.371	.764	**6.6**	**2.0**	.8	**.4**	**13.5**
2018–19	Brooklyn	67	8	25.4	.395	.342	.760	5.2	1.3	.5	.1	11.1
2019–20	San Antonio	15	0	9.0	.310	.231	.600	2.1	.7	.1	.1	2.2
2019–20	Houston	9	0	17.2	.432	.250	.773	2.7	1.6	.7	.3	6.0
Career		578	339	23.7	.430	.358	.741	4.2	1.3	.9	.3	8.9

=== Playoffs ===
Year	Team	GP	GS	MPG	FG%	3P%	FT%	RPG	APG	SPG	BPG	PPG
2012	Utah	4	0	18.3	.474	.200	.000	3.8	.8	.5	.3	4.8
2014	Atlanta	7	7	**35.1**	.469	**.409**	.636	4.9	1.6	.7	.4	8.9
2015	Atlanta	16	16	34.9	.486	.403	.780	**6.1**	**2.0**	**1.1**	.3	**14.6**
2016	Toronto	**20**	**19**	29.8	.390	.328	.750	4.1	.9	.9	.4	8.9
2017	Toronto	10	7	15.5	.405	.318	.556	2.7	.5	.8	**.5**	4.2
2019	Brooklyn	5	3	23.8	.237	.292	**1.000**	4.0	.4	.8	.0	6.6
2020	Houston	3	0	3.0	**.500**	.000	.000	1.5	.5	.0	.0	1.0
Career		64	52	27.4	.426	.353	.752	4.3	1.1	.9	.3	8.9

== Personal life ==
Carroll is the nephew of former Missouri and former Arkansas men's basketball coach Mike Anderson. His cousin, T.J. Cleveland, has worked as a college basketball assistant coach.

== Awards ==
- 2004 High School 6A Finals MVP
- 2004 Alabama-Mississippi Game MVP
- 2007 Rivals.com Top Transfer
- 2009 First Team All-Big 12
- 2009 Academic All-Big 12 Team
- 2009 Big 12 men's basketball tournament MVP
