= Langston (disambiguation) =

Langston is a name of English origin.

Langston may also refer to:

== Places ==
- Langston, Alabama, United States
- Langston, Oklahoma, United States

== Schools ==
- John Mercer Langston School, listed on the National Register of Historic Places in Washington, D.C.
- Langston University, a public university in Langston, Oklahoma, United States

== See also ==
- Looking for Langston, a 1989 film
- Langston Terrace Dwellings, listed on the National Register of Historic Places in Washington, D.C.
- Langston Hughes (disambiguation)
- Langston railway station, a former station, the area in Hampshire it served is now spelt Langstone
- Langstone (disambiguation)
