= Travis Wear =

American basketball player (born 1990)

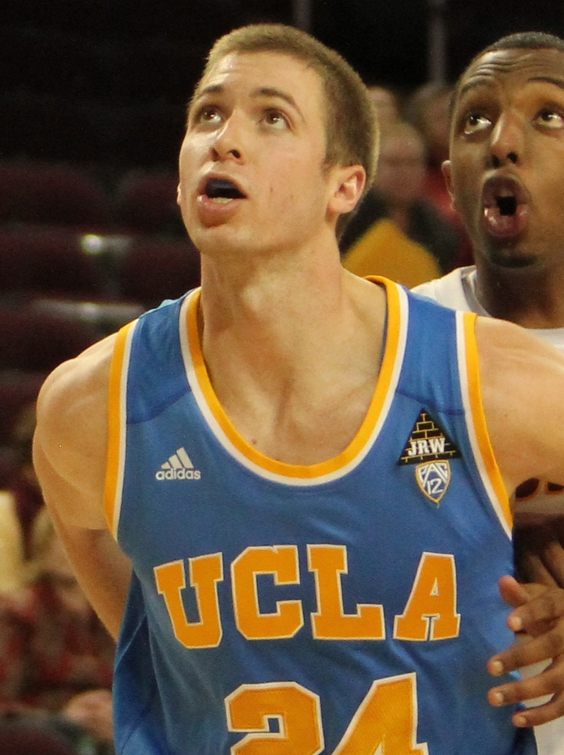
- Wear in college with UCLA in 2012

Personal information
- Born: September 21, 1990 (age 36) Long Beach, California, U.S.
- Listed height: 6 ft 10 in (2.08 m)
- Listed weight: 225 lb (102 kg)

Career information
- High school: Mater Dei (Santa Ana, California)
- College: North Carolina (2009–2010); UCLA (2011–2014)
- NBA draft: 2014: undrafted
- Playing career: 2014–2020
- Position: Power forward
- Number: 6, 21

Career history
- 2014–2015: New York Knicks
- 2015–2016: RETAbet.es GBC
- 2016–2018: Los Angeles D-Fenders / South Bay Lakers
- 2018: Los Angeles Lakers
- 2018: →South Bay Lakers
- 2018–2020: South Bay Lakers

Career highlights
- McDonald's All-American (2009); Fourth-team Parade All-American (2009)
- Stats at NBA.com
- Stats at Basketball Reference
Medals
Men's basketball
Representing United States
FIBA Americas U-18 Championship
Silver medal – second place	2008 Argentina	Team

Travis James Wear (born September 21, 1990) is an American former professional basketball player. He began his pro career with the New York Knicks after going undrafted in 2014.

Wear was an All-American in high school and won a silver medal with United States U-18 national team at the FIBA Americas Under-18 Championship in 2008. He played college basketball for the North Carolina Tar Heels and the UCLA Bruins. After playing one season with the Knicks, Wear played with San Sebastián Gipuzkoa BC in Spain for a year before returning to the U.S. to play with the Los Angeles D-Fenders.

== High school career ==
Wear attended Mater Dei High School in Santa Ana, California where he was a two-time California Interscholastic Federation State champion in 2007 and 2008. As a junior, he averaged 16.1 points and 8.3 rebounds per game. As a senior, he averaged 14.9 points and 6.4 rebounds per game.

Considered a four-star recruit by Rivals.com, Wear was listed as the No. 17 power forward and the No. 60 player in the nation in 2009.

== College career ==
=== North Carolina ===
Wear and his twin brother, David, played for the defending national champion North Carolina Tar Heels in their freshman year. Wear contributed 3.5 points and 2.2 rebounds a game while averaging over 10 minutes per game. The Tar Heels missed the National Collegiate Athletic Association (NCAA) tournament, which upset their fans. Wear said playing for North Carolina "wasn't what [he] thought it would be." The twin brothers transferred after the season in May 2010 to UCLA. They redshirted the following season due to NCAA transfer rules.

=== UCLA ===
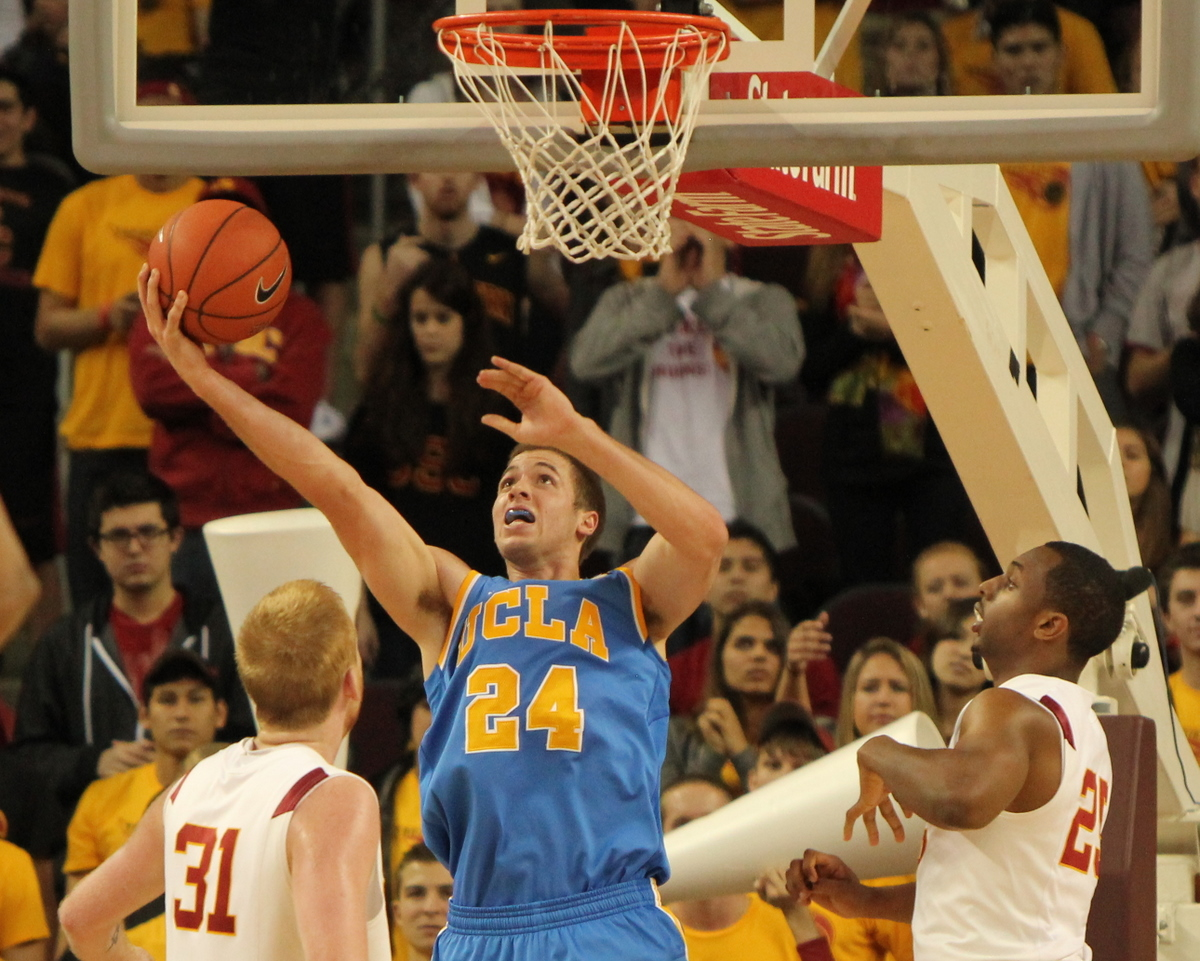
Wear against USC in 2012

In his first season playing for UCLA in 2011–12, Wear played in 30 games with 24 starts, and averaged 26.2 minutes per game and finished second on the team in points per game (11.5) and rebounds per game (5.9). He had a career-high 13 rebounds in a loss against St. John's on February 5, 2012. In 2012–13, he started in 31 of his 32 games, and averaged 10.9 points and 5.2 rebounds in 28.9 minutes. He scored a career-high 23 points in a win at Colorado on January 12, 2013. UCLA won the Pac-12 Conference championship that season. However, UCLA coach Ben Howland was fired after the season, prompting Wear and his brother to consider transferring. After meeting with incoming coach Steve Alford, the brothers were convinced they fit as starters in the new coach's system.

Wear missed the first three games of 2013–14 after he had an appendectomy on October 28, 2013. He came off the bench in his first six games before returning to the starting lineup. He was ninth in the Pac-12 in field goal percentage (53.0), and shot 44% on three-point field goals—including 10 of 19 in his final 16 games. He scored a season-high 16 points on 8-for-8 shooting in UCLA's win over Stanford in the Pac-12 tournament semifinals. At the team's annual banquet at the end of the season, Wear was presented with the Elvin C. Ducky Drake Memorial Award as the team member who exhibits tremendous competitive spirit, inspiration and unselfish contributions. He graduated after the season.

== Professional career ==
=== New York Knicks (2014–2015) ===
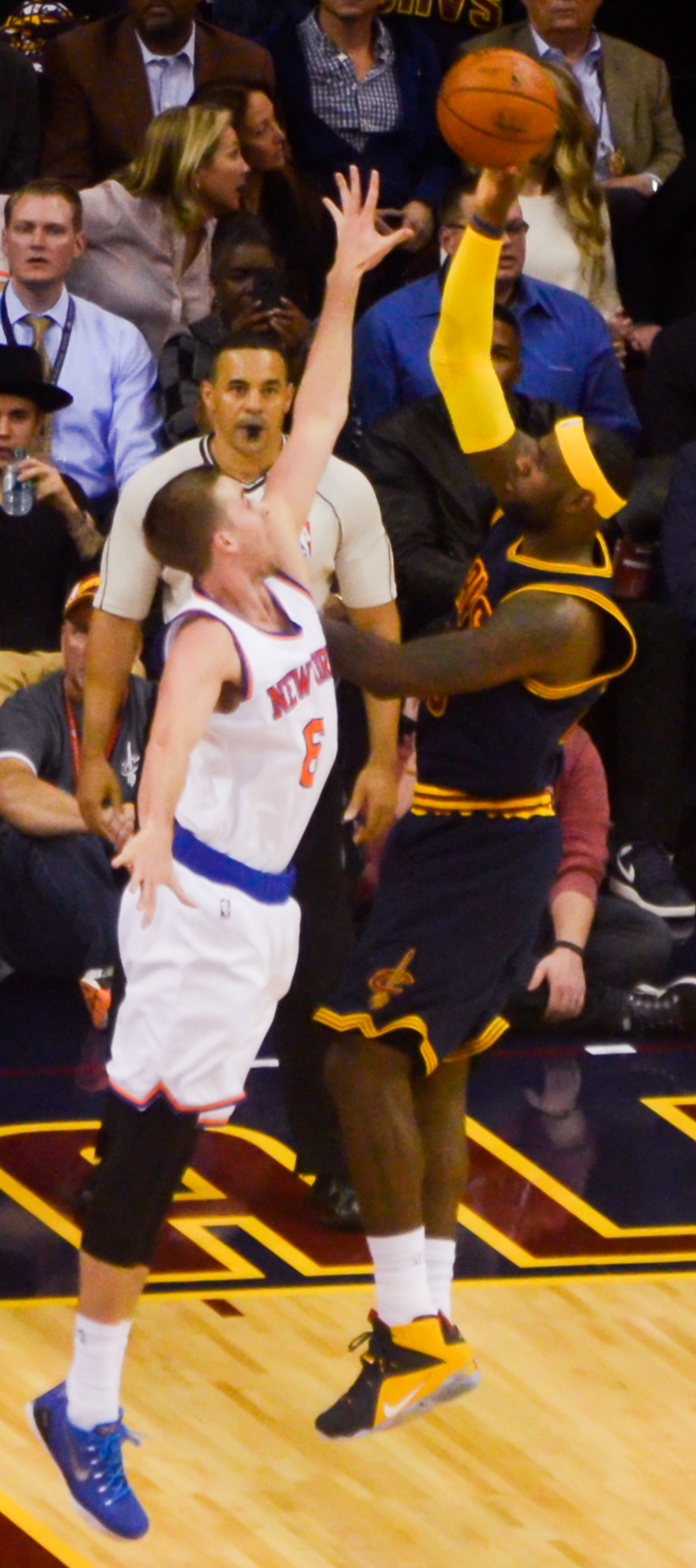
Wear defending LeBron James in 2014

Wear thought he had a chance to be selected in the second round of the 2014 NBA draft, but he went undrafted. He played for the Atlanta Hawks in the 2014 NBA Summer League, and was signed by the New York Knicks on September 9, 2014. The Knicks' roster already had 15 players with guaranteed contracts, and Wear was a longshot to make the team. However, they opened a roster spot for Wear by trading Travis Outlaw. Knicks president Phil Jackson said Wear was "overshadowed at UCLA but has the skill set to play every position from 1 to 4." He added that the team planned to have Wear play in the NBA Development League, "where his possible NBA future solely depends on his ability to learn how to defend." The Knicks lost their 2014–15 season opener in a 104–80 blowout to the Chicago Bulls, but Wear made his pro debut in the fourth quarter with the game already decided. The following night against the Cleveland Cavaliers, he played 13 minutes in a 95–90 win, and held LeBron James to 0-for-4 shooting when he was the primary defender on James.

On January 8, 2015, Wear scored a season-high 21 points in a 120–96 loss to Houston Rockets. On March 22, 2015, he left the game against the Toronto Raptors with lower back soreness. He missed the final 12 games of the season with the injury. He finished his rookie season averaging 3.9 points and 2.1 rebounds in 51 games.

=== Gipuzkoa Basket (2015–2016) ===
On October 7, 2015, Wear signed with Gipuzkoa Basket of the Liga ACB. In 26 games, he averaged 7.5 points, 4.2 rebounds and 0.7 blocks in 20.5 minutes.

=== Los Angeles D-Fenders / South Bay Lakers (2016–2018) ===
On September 1, 2016, Wear signed with the Los Angeles Lakers, but was waived on October 12 after appearing in two preseason games. He played 2016–17 with the Los Angeles D-Fenders of the NBA Development League as an affiliate player of the Lakers, and averaged 12.7 points and 7.3 rebounds per game.

Wear played with the Lakers in the 2017 summer league, and again joined the NBA team for their training camp.

Wear spent most of the season with the NBA G League South Bay Lakers.

=== Los Angeles Lakers (2018) ===
Wear signed a 10-day contract with the Los Angeles Lakers on March 2, 2018. Two days later, he made his Los Angeles debut against the San Antonio Spurs, playing the entire fourth quarter and scoring seven points with two rebounds to help the team rally to a 116–112 win. After his second 10-day contract expired later that month, Wear signed a deal for the remainder of the season and was assigned twice to South Bay. During the offseason, the Lakers signed Wear to a two-way contract for 2018–19. However, they waived him after the first game of the season to sign forward Johnathan Williams to a two-way deal.

=== Return to South Bay (2018–2020) ===
On November 27, 2018, the South Bay Lakers announced they had acquired Wear as a returning player. In January 2020, he suffered a season-ending injury.

== Career statistics ==
Legend
GP	Games played	GS	Games started	MPG	Minutes per game
FG%	Field goal percentage	3P%	3-point field goal percentage	FT%	Free throw percentage
RPG	Rebounds per game	APG	Assists per game	SPG	Steals per game
BPG	Blocks per game	PPG	Points per game	**Bold**	Career high

=== NBA ===
==== Regular season ====
Year	Team	GP	GS	MPG	FG%	3P%	FT%	RPG	APG	SPG	BPG	PPG
2014–15	New York	**51**	**1**	13.2	**.402**	**.367**	.769	2.1	**.8**	**.3**	.2	3.9
2017–18	L.A. Lakers	17	0	**13.4**	.347	.362	**1.000**	**2.2**	.4	.2	**.3**	**4.4**
Career		68	1	13.2	.388	.364	.824	2.1	.7	.3	.2	4.0

=== Liga ACB ===
Year	Team	GP	GS	MPG	FG%	3P%	FT%	RPG	APG	SPG	BPG	PPG
2015–16	RETAbet.es GBC	26	13	20.5	.448	.353	.737	4.2	.5	.7	.1	7.5
Career		26	13	20.5	.448	.353	.737	4.2	.5	.7	.1	7.5

=== College ===
Year	Team	GP	GS	MPG	FG%	3P%	FT%	RPG	APG	SPG	BPG	PPG
2009–10	North Carolina	32	1	10.1	.413	.400	.742	2.2	.2	.3	.1	3.5
2011–12	UCLA	30	24	26.2	**.533**	.429	.791	**5.9**	.4	**.7**	**1.2**	**11.5**
2012–13	UCLA	32	**31**	**28.8**	.493	.308	.815	5.2	.5	**.7**	1.0	10.9
2013–14	UCLA	**34**	28	23.9	.530	**.440**	**.833**	3.2	**1.4**	**.7**	.7	7.2
Career		128	84	22.2	.504	.400	.798	4.1	.7	.6	.7	8.2

== Personal life ==
Wear is the son of David Sr. and Gloria Wear. His father played college basketball at Fresno State and Cal State Fullerton and professionally overseas. Wear's favorite basketball player of all time is Earvin "Magic" Johnson. His twin brother, David also became a professional basketball player.
