= Ricky Ledo =

American basketball player (born 1992)

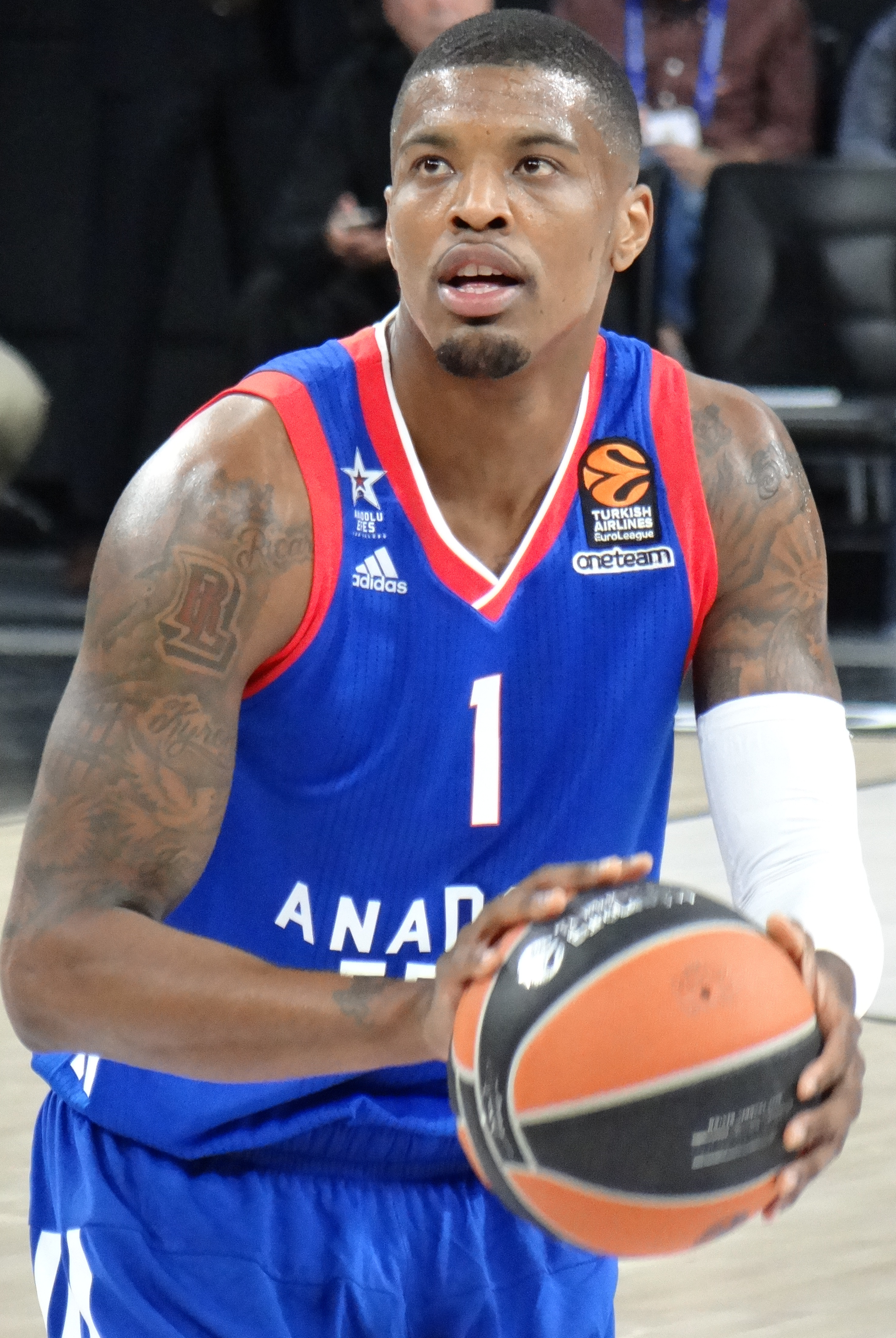
- Ledo with Anadolu Efes in 2017

No. 5 – Trotamundos de Carabobo
- Position: Small forward
- League: Superliga Profesional de Baloncesto

Personal information
- Born: September 10, 1992 (age 33) Providence, Rhode Island, U.S.
- Listed height: 6 ft 7 in (2.01 m)
- Listed weight: 200 lb (91 kg)

Career information
- High school: Bishop Hendricken (Warwick, Rhode Island); St. Andrew's (Barrington, Rhode Island); Notre Dame Prep (Fitchburg, Massachusetts); South Kent (South Kent, Connecticut)
- NBA draft: 2013: 2nd round, 43rd overall pick
- Drafted by: Milwaukee Bucks
- Playing career: 2013–present

Career history
- 2013–2015: Dallas Mavericks
- 2013–2015: → Texas Legends
- 2015: New York Knicks
- 2015–2016: Reno Bighorns
- 2016: Santeros de Aguada
- 2016–2017: Yeşilgiresun Belediye
- 2017: Baskonia
- 2017: Anadolu Efes
- 2018: Wisconsin Herd
- 2018: Vaqueros de Bayamón
- 2018: Reggiana
- 2019: Beijing Fly Dragons
- 2019–2020: Anwil Włocławek
- 2021: Shanxi Loongs
- 2021: Fethiye Belediyespor
- 2021: Gigantes de Carolina
- 2021: Formosa Taishin Dreamers
- 2022: Guangdong Southern Tigers
- 2022: Al Riyadi
- 2023: Semt77 Yalovaspor
- 2023: Anhui Wenyi
- 2024: Al Muharraq
- 2024: Blackwater Bossing
- 2024–2025: Beirut Club
- 2025–2026: CS Antonine
- 2026–present: Trotamundos de Carabobo

Career highlights
- Polish Cup winner (2019); Süper Ligi top scorer (2017); NBA D-League All-Star (2016)
- Stats at NBA.com
- Stats at Basketball Reference

Ricardo Julio Ledo (born September 10, 1992) is an American professional basketball player for the Trotamundos de Carabobo of the Superliga Profesional de Baloncesto (SPB). He committed to play for the Providence Friars, but the National Collegiate Athletic Association (NCAA) ruled him academically ineligible to play during his freshman season in 2012–13. Ledo never played for the Friars that season, and at the end of the year he declared he was entering the 2013 NBA draft.

== High school career ==
During his high school career, Ledo spent his first two years enrolled at Bishop Hendricken High School in Warwick, Rhode Island. Ledo attended St. Andrew's School in Barrington, Rhode Island, Notre Dame Preparatory School in Fitchburg, Massachusetts, and South Kent School in South Kent, Connecticut. At St. Andrew's, Ledo's squad finished second in the NEPSAC Class B conference; at Notre Dame, he led the team to the Prep National Finals; and, at South Kent, he was a Second Team All-Conference performer as a senior.

== College ineligibility ==
Ledo was rated the #21 overall college prospect by ESPN and was a McDonald's All-American. He committed to play for Providence College in his home state of Rhode Island. In September of his freshman year, the NCAA ruled him academically ineligible due to not having enough credits. He stayed at school with the hope that he would be eligible during the second semester, but the NCAA never reinstated him.

== Professional career ==
=== Dallas Mavericks (2013–2015) ===
After spending one year at Providence without being able to play, Ledo declared for the 2013 NBA draft. Despite never playing a single game in his career with Providence, he is still credited by the NBA as a player who came out of Providence as opposed to high school.

Ledo was selected by the Milwaukee Bucks with the 43rd overall pick in the 2013 NBA draft. His draft rights were then traded to the Philadelphia 76ers and finally to the Dallas Mavericks. On July 24, 2013, he signed his rookie scale contract with the Mavericks. During his rookie and sophomore seasons, he had multiple assignments with the Texas Legends of the NBA Development League. In order to make room for the signing of Amar'e Stoudemire, the Mavericks waived Ledo on February 18, 2015, after appearing in just 16 games over two seasons. On March 3, he re-joined the Texas Legends.

=== New York Knicks (2015) ===
On March 19, 2015, Ledo signed a 10-day contract with the New York Knicks. On March 29, he signed a second 10-day contract with the Knicks. On April 3, he scored a career-high 21 points in an 87–101 loss to the Washington Wizards. On April 8, he signed with the Knicks for the rest of the season. On July 30, he was waived by the Knicks.

=== Reno Bighorns (2015–2016) ===
On October 30, 2015, he was acquired by the Reno Bighorns of the NBA Development League. On February 8, 2016, he was named in the West All-Star team for the 2016 NBA D-League All-Star Game as a replacement for Erick Green, who received an NBA call-up, after averaging 20.1 points, 6.4 rebounds, 2.5 assists and 29.9 minutes in 30 games.

=== International career and G-League (2016–present) ===
On April 21, 2016, Ledo signed with Santeros de Aguada of the Puerto Rican League. Two days later he made his debut for Santeros in an 80–79 loss to the Atléticos de San Germán, recording 21 points, four rebounds, two assists and one steal in 28 minutes. On May 12, he was waived by Santeros.

On August 12, 2016, Ledo signed with Turkish BSL club Yeşilgiresun Belediye for the 2016–17 Basketbol Süper Ligi season. Ledo finished the season as scoring champion, after he averaged 21.1 points per game. After the end of the Turkish season, on May 14, 2017, Ledo signed with Spanish club Baskonia for the 2017 ACB Playoffs.

On June 7, 2017, Ledo signed a two-year deal with Turkish club Anadolu Efes. He was released by Efes after appearing in six BSL games and twelve EuroLeague games. In January 2018, he was acquired by the Wisconsin Herd of the NBA G League, where he played in 17 games, averaging 15.3 points, 6.5 rebounds, 2.7 assists and 1.6 steals in 33.9 minutes. On March 27, after the G League season concluded, he signed with Vaqueros de Bayamón of the Puerto Rican League.

On July 26, 2018, Ledo signed a one-year deal with Italian club Pallacanestro Reggiana. On November 29, 2018, Pallacanestro Reggiana announced that they have parted ways with Ledo. The American was the top scorer in Serie A so far with 23.5 points per game in eight contests.

On January 18, 2019, Ledo joined Beijing Fly Dragons to replace Pierre Jackson.

On August 6, 2019, he signed with Anwil Włocławek of the Polish Basketball League. During the 2019–20 season, he averaged 16.7 points, 4.8 rebounds, 4.5 assists, and 2.0 steals per game.

On January 4, 2021, Ledo signed with the Chinese basketball team, Shanxi Loongs. On February 23, 2021, his contract was terminated.

On February 27, 2021, he signed with Lokman Hekim Fethiye Belediyespor of the Turkish BSL.

On November 23, 2021, Ledo signed with Formosa Taishin Dreamers of the P. LEAGUE+. On December 23, 2021, his contract was terminated.

In January 2022, Ledo joined Guangdong Southern Tigers.

On March 7, 2023, he signed with Semt77 Yalovaspor of the Turkish Basketball League (TBL).

On July 11, 2023, Ledo signed with Anhui Wenyi of the National Basketball League.

On January 3, 2024, Ledo returned to Europe after another stint in China, signing with Greek club AEK Athens for the rest of the season. On January 15, however, Ledo was released from the club.

On July 16, 2024, Ledo signed with the Blackwater Bossing of the Philippine Basketball Association (PBA) as the team's import for the 2024 PBA Governors' Cup. On August 26, 2024, he was replaced by George King.

On December 22, 2024, Ledo signed with the Beirut Club of the Lebanese Basketball League.

== NBA career statistics ==
Legend
GP	Games played	GS	Games started	MPG	Minutes per game
FG%	Field goal percentage	3P%	3-point field goal percentage	FT%	Free throw percentage
RPG	Rebounds per game	APG	Assists per game	SPG	Steals per game
BPG	Blocks per game	PPG	Points per game	**Bold**	Career high

=== Regular season ===
Year	Team	GP	GS	MPG	FG%	3P%	FT%	RPG	APG	SPG	BPG	PPG
2013–14	Dallas	11	0	3.0	.353	.375	**1.000**	.2	.2	.1	.0	1.7
2014–15	Dallas	5	0	2.2	.000	.000	.500	.4	.2	.0	.0	.2
2014–15	New York	**12**	0	**19.4**	**.356**	**.417**	.750	**2.8**	**1.5**	**.5**	**.1**	**7.4**
Career		28	0	9.9	.336	.371	.769	1.4	.8	.3	.0	3.9
