= Langston =

Langston is a name of English origin. People with the name include:

== People with the given name ==
- Langston Galloway (born 1991), American basketball player
- Langston Hall (born 1991), American basketball player
- Langston Hughes (1901–1967), African-American poet, novelist, playwright, and newspaper columnist
- Langston Love (born 2002), American basketball player
- Langston Moore (born 1981), American football player
- Langston Walker (born 1979), American football player

== People with the surname ==
- Big E Langston (born 1986), American professional wrestler
- Charles Henry Langston (1817–1892), African-American abolitionist and political activist
- Clinton Langston (born 1962), British Anglican priest and military chaplain
- Dicey Langston (1766–1837), Patriot spy at the time of the American Revolution
- Grant Langston (motorcyclist) (born 1982), South African motocross champion
- John Langston (MP) (c. 1758–1812–1812), English merchant banker and politician, Member of Parliament (MP) 1784–1807
- John Mercer Langston (1829–1897), U.S. civil rights pioneer, first African-American member of Congress
- Mark Langston (born 1960), Major League Baseball pitcher
- Michael Langston, computer scientist in field of bioinformatics and computational biology
- Murray Langston, Canadian-American known as The Unknown Comic
- Peter Langston (born 1946), computer programmer
- Wann Langston, Jr. (1921–2013), American paleontologist
- William Langston, American neurologist

== People with the middle name ==
- John Langston Gwaltney (1928–1998), African-American writer and anthropologist
- Jamie Langston Turner (born 1949), American novelist

== Fictional characters ==
- Howard Langston, a fictional character from the 1996 film Jingle All the Way
- Langston Wilde Cramer, a fictional character from the American soap opera One Life to Live
- Langston Field, a fictional technology found in the book The Mote in God's Eye
- Langston Graham, a fictional character from the television series Chuck
- Raymond Langston, a fictional character from the television series CSI: Crime Scene Investigation
- Sally Langston, a fictional character from the television series Scandal
- Baby Langston, "Sugarland Express"

== See also ==
- Lanston
