= David Wear =

American basketball player (born 1990)

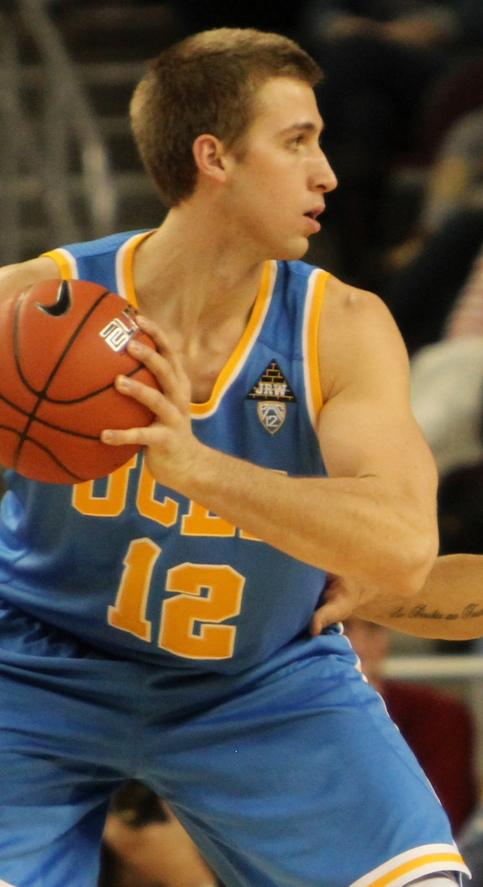
- Wear in college with UCLA in 2012

Personal information
- Born: September 21, 1990 (age 36) Long Beach, California, U.S.
- Listed height: 6 ft 10 in (2.08 m)
- Listed weight: 225 lb (102 kg)

Career information
- High school: Mater Dei (Santa Ana, California)
- College: North Carolina (2009–2010); UCLA (2011–2014)
- NBA draft: 2014: undrafted
- Playing career: 2014–2019
- Position: Power forward
- Number: 31

Career history
- 2014–2015: Reno Bighorns
- 2015: Sacramento Kings
- 2015–2017: Baloncesto Fuenlabrada
- 2017–2018: Osaka Evessa
- 2018–2019: Sydney Kings

Career highlights
- NBA D-League All-Rookie Third Team (2015); McDonald's All-American (2009); Fourth-team Parade All-American (2009)
- Stats at NBA.com
- Stats at Basketball Reference
Medals
Men's basketball
Representing United States
FIBA Americas U-18 Championship
Silver medal – second place	2008 Argentina	Team

David Earl Wear Jr. (born September 21, 1990) is an American former professional basketball player. He played college basketball for the North Carolina Tar Heels and the UCLA Bruins. He played briefly with the Sacramento Kings in the National Basketball Association (NBA) in 2015.

In high school, Wear won a silver medal for the United States national team at the FIBA Americas Under-18 Championship. He was named an All-American as a senior in 2009. He played in college for one season at North Carolina before transferring to UCLA. After going undrafted in the 2014 NBA draft, he played most of 2014–15 in the NBA Development League (now known as the NBA G League), but also had a brief stint in the NBA with Sacramento. He then played two seasons in Spain with Baloncesto Fuenlabrada before joining Osaka.

== High school career ==
Wear attended Mater Dei High School in Santa Ana, California where he was a two-time California Interscholastic Federation State champion in 2007 and 2008. As a junior, he averaged 18.9 points and 10.0 rebounds per game. As a senior, he averaged 16.4 points and 7.5 rebounds per game. Wear was selected as the 2009 county boys' basketball player of the year, a 2009 fourth-team Parade All-American, a repeat first team all-county member, first team All-Division I-AA member, first team all-league member, second team all-state in 2009, and an all-state sophomore in 2007.

Considered a four-star recruit by Rivals.com, Wear was listed as the No. 16 power forward and the No. 59 player in the nation in 2009.

== College career ==
Wear and his twin brother, Travis, played for the defending national champion North Carolina Tar Heels in their freshman year. Wear contributed 2.9 points and 1.7 rebounds a game while averaging over 10 minutes per game. The Tar Heels missed the National Collegiate Athletic Association (NCAA) tournament, which upset their fans. Brother Travis said playing for North Carolina "wasn't what I thought it would be." The twin brothers transferred after the season in May 2010 to UCLA. They redshirted the following season due to NCAA transfer rules.

UCLA won the Pac-12 Conference championship in 2012–13. However, UCLA coach Ben Howland was fired after the season, prompting Wear and his brother to consider transferring. After meeting with incoming coach Steve Alford, the brothers were convinced they fit as starters in the new coach's system. On January 26, 2014, Wear scored a career-high 18 points against California, eclipsing his previous high of 17 in 2011, also against Cal. At the team's annual banquet after the 2013–14 season, Wear was awarded the Irv Pohlmeyer Memorial Trophy, for being the team's top defensive player. He graduated following the season.

== Professional career ==
=== D-League and NBA (2014–2016) ===
After going undrafted in the 2014 NBA draft, Wear joined the Chicago Bulls for the 2014 NBA Summer League. On September 25, 2014, he signed with the Sacramento Kings. However, he was later waived by the Kings on October 19, 2014. On November 2, 2014, he was acquired by the Reno Bighorns as an affiliate player. Wear's shooting ability allowed him to thrive in Coach David Arseneault Jr.'s run-and-gun system, and he was invited to participate in the Three-Point Contest during the 2015 D-League All-Star Weekend.

On March 23, 2015, Wear signed a 10-day contract with the Sacramento Kings. He was not retained by the Kings following the expiration of his 10-day contract on April 2. In July 2015, Wear joined the Detroit Pistons for the Orlando Summer League and the Sacramento Kings for the Las Vegas Summer League.

=== Overseas (2016–present) ===
On August 10, 2015, Wear signed with Baloncesto Fuenlabrada of Spain for the 2015–16 season. On August 1, 2016, he re-signed with Baloncesto Fuenlabrada for the 2016–17 season.

In 2017–18, Wear moved to Japan to play with Osaka Evessa in the B.League and played with the Sydney Kings of the Australian National Basketball League in 2018–19.

== National team career ==
In July 2008, Wear won a silver medal playing for the USA Basketball Men's U18 National Team at the FIBA Americas U18 Championship in Formosa, Argentina.

== Career statistics ==
=== NBA statistics ===
Legend
GP	Games played	GS	Games started	MPG	Minutes per game
FG%	Field goal percentage	3P%	3-point field goal percentage	FT%	Free throw percentage
RPG	Rebounds per game	APG	Assists per game	SPG	Steals per game
BPG	Blocks per game	PPG	Points per game	**Bold**	Career high

Year	Team	GP	GS	MPG	FG%	3P%	FT%	RPG	APG	SPG	BPG	PPG
2014–15	Sacramento	2	0	3.5	.000	.000	—	1.0	.5	.0	.0	0.0
Career		2	0	3.5	.000	.000	—	1.0	.5	.0	.0	0.0

=== College statistics ===
Year	Team	GP	GS	MPG	FG%	3P%	FT%	RPG	APG	SPG	BPG	PPG
2009–10	North Carolina	27	2	10.4	.437	**.500**	.563	1.7	.4	.3	.1	2.9
2011–12	UCLA	32	30	**28.4**	.487	.467	.791	**6.3**	.8	**.7**	.2	**10.2**
2012–13	UCLA	34	9	23.4	.445	.341	.639	5.0	**1.0**	.5	**.3**	7.1
2013–14	UCLA	**37**	**37**	22.9	**.503**	.442	**.805**	3.8	.8	.6	.2	6.5
Career		130	78	21.8	.471	.423	.798	4.3	.7	.5	.2	6.8

== Personal ==
Wear is the son of David Sr. and Gloria Wear. His father played college basketball at Fresno State and Cal State Fullerton and professionally overseas. His twin brother, Travis, also became a pro basketball player.

Wear's wife Christina played basketball professionally overseas.
