= 2014–15 New York Knicks season =

Season of National Basketball Association team the New York Knicks

- Head coach: Derek Fisher
- President: Phil Jackson
- General manager: Steve Mills
- Owners: Madison Square Garden, Inc.
- Arena: Madison Square Garden

Results
- Record: 17–65 (.207)
- Place: Division: 5th (Atlantic); Conference: 15th (Eastern)
- Playoff finish: Did not qualify
- Stats at Basketball Reference

Local media
- Television: MSG (TV channel)
- Radio: WEPN-FM

The 2014–15 New York Knicks season was the 69th season of the franchise in the National Basketball Association (NBA). The city of New York City, New York hosted the NBA All-Star weekend, with the Knicks' home arena Madison Square Garden used as the venue for the 2015 NBA All-Star Game. On March 28, the Knicks set a new franchise-record 60 losses in a season, finishing at 65. The Knicks missed the playoffs for the second consecutive season, and for the tenth out of fourteen since 2001–02. This particular season has been commonly referred to as the worst season in Knicks history as it was the first time they had lost more than 60 games in franchise history. The Lakers also lost more than 60 games that year, leaving the Utah Jazz as the sole franchise to not have a 60+ losing record.

== Preseason ==
=== Draft picks ===
Round	Pick	Player	Position	Nationality	College / Club
2	34	Cleanthony Early	SF	United States	Wichita State
2	51	Thanasis Antetokounmpo	SF	Greece	Delaware 87ers (D-League)

== Regular season ==
=== Standings ===
Atlantic Division	W	L	PCT	GB	Home	Road	Div	GP
y-Toronto Raptors	49	33	.598	–	27‍–‍14	22‍–‍19	11–5	82
x-Boston Celtics	40	42	.488	9.0	21‍–‍20	19‍–‍22	12–4	82
x-Brooklyn Nets	38	44	.463	11.0	19‍–‍22	19‍–‍22	10–6	82
Philadelphia 76ers	18	64	.220	31.0	12‍–‍29	6‍–‍35	2–14	82
New York Knicks	17	65	.207	32.0	10‍–‍31	7‍–‍34	5–11	82

Eastern Conference
#	Team	W	L	PCT	GB	GP
1	c-Atlanta Hawks *	60	22	.732	–	82
2	y-Cleveland Cavaliers *	53	29	.646	7.0	82
3	x-Chicago Bulls	50	32	.610	10.0	82
4	y-Toronto Raptors *	49	33	.598	11.0	82
5	x-Washington Wizards	46	36	.561	14.0	82
6	x-Milwaukee Bucks	41	41	.500	19.0	82
7	x-Boston Celtics	40	42	.488	20.0	82
8	x-Brooklyn Nets	38	44	.463	22.0	82
9	Indiana Pacers	38	44	.463	22.0	82
10	Miami Heat	37	45	.451	23.0	82
11	Charlotte Hornets	33	49	.402	27.0	82
12	Detroit Pistons	32	50	.390	28.0	82
13	Orlando Magic	25	57	.305	35.0	82
14	Philadelphia 76ers	18	64	.220	42.0	82
15	New York Knicks	17	65	.207	43.0	82

== Game log ==
=== Preseason ===
2014 pre-season game log
Total: 3–4 (Home: 1–2; Road: 2–2)
Pre-season: 3–4 (home: 1–2; road: 2–2)

Game	Date	Team	Score	High points	High rebounds	High assists	Location Attendance	Record
1	October 8	@ Boston	L 86–106	Tim Hardaway Jr. (18)	Tim Hardaway Jr. (6)	Carmelo Anthony (4)	XL Center (8,462)	0–1
2	October 11	@ Boston	W 96–80	Carmelo Anthony (16)	Samuel Dalembert (8)	Samuel Dalembert (2)	Mohegan Sun Arena (9,252)	1–1
3	October 13	Toronto	L 76–81	J. R. Smith (10)	Amar'e Stoudemire (8)	Iman Shumpert (6)	Madison Square Garden (19,812)	1–2
4	October 14	@ Philadelphia	W 84–77	Carmelo Anthony (17)	Carmelo Anthony (7)	Iman Shumpert (4)	Carrier Dome (11,259)	2–2
5	October 20	Milwaukee	L 107–120	Carmelo Anthony (24)	Carmelo Anthony (9)	Carmelo Anthony (6)	Madison Square Garden (19,812)	2–3
6	October 22	Washington	W 103–100	Carmelo Anthony (30)	Amar'e Stoudemire (8)	Samuel Dalembert (5)	Madison Square Garden (19,812)	3–3
7	October 24	@ Toronto	L 80–83	Carmelo Anthony (24)	Samuel Dalembert (10)	Pablo Prigioni (7)	Bell Centre (20,738)	3–4

2014–15 season schedule

=== Regular season ===
2014–15 game log
Total: 17–65 (Home: 10–31; Road: 7–34)
October: 1–1 (home: 0–1; road: 1–0)

Game	Date	Team	Score	High points	High rebounds	High assists	Location Attendance	Record
1	October 29	Chicago	L 80–104	Carmelo Anthony (22)	Amar'e Stoudemire (11)	Carmelo Anthony (6)	Madison Square Garden; 19,812	0–1
2	October 30	@ Cleveland	W 95–90	Carmelo Anthony (25)	Quincy Acy (10)	J. R. Smith (7)	Quicken Loans Arena; 20,562	1–1

November : 3–13 (home: 3–5; road: 0–8)

Game	Date	Team	Score	High points	High rebounds	High assists	Location Attendance	Record
3	November 2	Charlotte	W 96–93	Carmelo Anthony (28)	Amar'e Stoudemire (10)	Shane Larkin (5)	Madison Square Garden; 19,812	2–1
4	November 4	Washington	L 83–98	Iman Shumpert (19)	Amar'e Stoudemire (12)	J. R. Smith (4)	Madison Square Garden; 19,812	2–2
5	November 5	@ Detroit	L 95–98	Tim Hardaway Jr. (20)	Amar'e Stoudemire (8)	Carmelo Anthony (8)	The Palace of Auburn Hills; 11,915	2–3
6	November 7	@ Brooklyn	L 99–110	Carmelo Anthony (19)	Iman Shumpert (9)	Quincy Acy (5)	Barclays Center; 17,732	2–4
7	November 8	@ Atlanta	L 96–103	Carmelo Anthony (20)	Carmelo Anthony (9)	Iman Shumpert (7)	Philips Arena; 17,521	2–5
8	November 10	Atlanta	L 85–91	Carmelo Anthony (25)	Amar'e Stoudemire (10)	Carmelo Anthony (7)	Madison Square Garden; 19,812	2–6
9	November 12	Orlando	L 95–97	Carmelo Anthony (27)	Iman Shumpert (8)	Samuel Dalembert (4)	Madison Square Garden; 19,812	2–7
10	November 14	Utah	L 100–102	Carmelo Anthony (46)	Carmelo Anthony (7)	Shane Larkin (4)	Madison Square Garden; 19,812	2–8
11	November 16	Denver	W 109–93	Anthony, Smith (28)	Carmelo Anthony (9)	J. R. Smith (4)	Madison Square Garden; 19,812	3–8
12	November 18	@ Milwaukee	L 113–117	Carmelo Anthony (26)	Iman Shumpert (8)	Iman Shumpert (8)	BMO Harris Bradley Center; 12,190	3–9
13	November 19	@ Minnesota	L 99–115	Carmelo Anthony (20)	Acy, Wear (8)	Larkin, Smith (4)	Target Center; 15,304	3–10
14	November 22	Philadelphia	W 91–83	Carmelo Anthony (25)	Amar'e Stoudemire (11)	Calderón, Shumpert (3)	Madison Square Garden; 19,812	4–10
15	November 24	@ Houston	L 86–91	Carmelo Anthony (14)	Acy, Stoudemire (8)	Calderón, Shumpert (5)	Toyota Center; 18,133	4–11
16	November 26	@ Dallas	L 102–109 (OT)	José Calderón (21)	Samuel Dalembert (13)	Pablo Prigioni (6)	American Airlines Center; 20,352	4–12
17	November 28	@ Oklahoma City	L 78–105	Amar'e Stoudemire (20)	Amar'e Stoudemire (9)	J. R. Smith (4)	Chesapeake Energy Arena; 18,203	4–13
18	November 30	Miami	L 79–86	Carmelo Anthony (31)	Amar'e Stoudemire (12)	José Calderón (6)	Madison Square Garden; 19,812	4–14

December : 1–15 (home: 0–7; road: 1–8)

Game	Date	Team	Score	High points	High rebounds	High assists	Location Attendance	Record
19	December 2	Brooklyn	L 93–98	Carmelo Anthony (20)	Anthony, Stoudemire (9)	José Calderón (7)	Madison Square Garden; 19,812	4–15
20	December 4	Cleveland	L 87–90	Tim Hardaway Jr. (20)	Carmelo Anthony (10)	Anthony, Prigioni, Shumpert (4)	Madison Square Garden; 19,812	4–16
21	December 5	@ Charlotte	L 102–103	Carmelo Anthony (32)	Samuel Dalembert (8)	Pablo Prigioni (7)	Time Warner Cable Arena; 19,102	4–17
22	December 7	Portland	L 99–103	Carmelo Anthony (23)	Anthony, Stoudemire (10)	Anthony, Calderón, Shumpert (3)	Madison Square Garden; 19,812	4–18
23	December 9	@ New Orleans	L 93–104	Amar'e Stoudemire (26)	Carmelo Anthony (8)	José Calderón (6)	Smoothie King Center; 13,789	4–19
24	December 10	@ San Antonio	L 95–109	Tim Hardaway Jr. (23)	Samuel Dalembert (6)	Iman Shumpert (6)	AT&T Center; 18,581	4–20
25	December 12	@ Boston	W 101–95	Carmelo Anthony (22)	Amar'e Stoudemire (7)	José Calderón (7)	TD Garden; 17,989	5–20
26	December 14	Toronto	L 90–95 (OT)	Carmelo Anthony (34)	Carmelo Anthony (9)	José Calderón (5)	Madison Square Garden; 19,812	5–21
27	December 16	Dallas	L 87–107	Carmelo Anthony (26)	4 tied (5)	Pablo Prigioni (9)	Madison Square Garden; 19,812	5–22
28	December 18	@ Chicago	L 97–103	Tim Hardaway Jr. (23)	Cole Aldrich (10)	Tim Hardaway Jr. (5)	United Center; 21,875	5–23
29	December 20	Phoenix	L 90–99	Carmelo Anthony (25)	Samuel Dalembert (12)	Pablo Prigioni (7)	Madison Square Garden; 19,812	5–24
30	December 21	@ Toronto	L 108–118	Carmelo Anthony (28)	Cole Aldrich (10)	José Calderón (10)	Air Canada Centre; 19,800	5–25
31	December 25	Washington	L 91–102	Carmelo Anthony (28)	Amar'e Stoudemire (7)	José Calderón (4)	Madison Square Garden; 19,812	5–26
32	December 27	@ Sacramento	L 129–135 (OT)	Carmelo Anthony (36)	Carmelo Anthony (11)	José Calderón (9)	Sleep Train Arena; 17,317	5–27
33	December 28	@ Portland	L 79–101	Tim Hardaway Jr. (17)	Cole Aldrich (19)	Hardaway Jr., Larkin (5)	Moda Center; 19,800	5–28
34	December 31	@ L.A. Clippers	L 78–99	Carmelo Anthony (19)	Jason Smith (10)	Aldrich, Larkin (5)	Staples Center; 19,198	5–29

January : 4–9 (home: 3–4; road: 1–5)

Game	Date	Team	Score	High points	High rebounds	High assists	Location Attendance	Record
35	January 2	Detroit	L 81–97	J. R. Smith (22)	Cole Aldrich (14)	J. R. Smith (5)	Madison Square Garden; 19,812	5–30
36	January 4	Milwaukee	L 82–95	Tim Hardaway Jr. (17)	Acy, Aldrich, Smith (7)	José Calderón (5)	Madison Square Garden; 19,812	5–31
37	January 5	@ Memphis	L 83–105	Quincy Acy (19)	Quincy Acy (14)	Shane Larkin (8)	FedExForum; 16,888	5–32
38	January 7	@ Washington	L 91–101	José Calderón (17)	Quincy Acy (9)	4 tied (3)	Verizon Center; 16,902	5–33
39	January 8	Houston	L 96–120	Travis Wear (21)	Cleanthony Early (6)	Shane Larkin (5)	Madison Square Garden; 19,812	5–34
40	January 10	Charlotte	L 82–110	Quincy Acy (18)	Cole Aldrich (12)	Shane Larkin (4)	Madison Square Garden; 19,812	5–35
41	January 15	@ Milwaukee	L 79–95	Carmelo Anthony (25)	Lou Amundson (6)	José Calderón (9)	The O2 Arena; 18,689	5–36
42	January 19	New Orleans	W 99–92	Carmelo Anthony (24)	Carmelo Anthony (9)	Jason Smith (6)	Madison Square Garden; 19,812	6–36
43	January 21	@ Philadelphia	W 98–91	Carmelo Anthony (27)	Carmelo Anthony (11)	José Calderón (7)	Wells Fargo Center; 13,201	7–36
44	January 23	Orlando	W 113–106	Carmelo Anthony (25)	Cole Aldrich (9)	José Calderón (7)	Madison Square Garden; 19,812	8–36
45	January 24	@ Charlotte	L 71–76	Tim Hardaway Jr. (17)	Cole Aldrich (13)	Tim Hardaway Jr. (4)	Time Warner Cable Arena; 19,117	8–37
46	January 28	Oklahoma City	W 100–92	Carmelo Anthony (31)	Jason Smith (11)	José Calderón (8)	Madison Square Garden; 19,812	9–37
47	January 29	@ Indiana	L 82–103	Carmelo Anthony (18)	Jason Smith (7)	José Calderón (6)	Bankers Life Fieldhouse; 15,665	9–38

February : 3–8 (home: 2–4; road: 1–4)

Game	Date	Team	Score	High points	High rebounds	High assists	Location Attendance	Record
48	February 1	L.A. Lakers	W 92–80	Carmelo Anthony (31)	Lou Amundson (13)	Calderon, Smith (4)	Madison Square Garden; 19,812	10–38
49	February 3	Boston	L 97–108	Carmelo Anthony (21)	Jason Smith (7)	Galloway, Smith (5)	Madison Square Garden; 19,812	10–39
50	February 6	@ Brooklyn	L 88–92	Carmelo Anthony (21)	Langston Galloway (11)	José Calderón (7)	Barclays Center; 17,732	10–40
51	February 7	Golden State	L 92–106	Langston Galloway (15)	Jason Smith (13)	Shane Larkin (4)	Madison Square Garden; 19,812	10–41
52	February 9	@ Miami	L 95–109	Carmelo Anthony (26)	Langston Galloway (9)	José Calderón (6)	American Airlines Arena; 19,851	10–42
53	February 11	@ Orlando	L 83–89	Jason Smith (25)	Jason Smith (7)	José Calderón (7)	Amway Center; 19,851	10–43
All-Star Break
54	February 20	Miami	L 87–111	Langston Galloway (19)	Smith, Bargnani (6)	José Calderón (9)	Madison Square Garden; 19,812	10–44
55	February 22	Cleveland	L 83–101	Langston Galloway (13)	Tim Hardaway Jr. (7)	Langston Galloway (5)	Madison Square Garden; 19,812	10–45
56	February 25	@ Boston	L 94–115	Andrea Bargnani (17)	Jason Smith (10)	José Calderón (7)	TD Garden; 16,899	10–46
57	February 27	@ Detroit	W 121–115 (2OT)	Andrea Bargnani (25)	Lou Amundson (14)	Langston Galloway (5)	The Palace of Auburn Hills; 16,182	11–46
58	February 28	Toronto	W 103–98	Tim Hardaway Jr. (22)	Langston Galloway (8)	Alexey Shved (5)	Madison Square Garden; 19,812	12–46

March : 2–15 (home: 1–7; road: 1–8)

Game	Date	Team	Score	High points	High rebounds	High assists	Location Attendance	Record
59	March 3	Sacramento	L 86–124	Alexey Shved (15)	Aldrich, Shved (7)	Shane Larkin (6)	Madison Square Garden; 19,812	12–47
60	March 4	@ Indiana	L 82–105	Andrea Bargnani (25)	Lou Amundson (10)	Bargnani, Larkin (4)	Bankers Life Fieldhouse; 15,981	12–48
61	March 7	Indiana	L 86–92	Andrea Bargnani (21)	Cole Aldrich (11)	Langston Galloway (4)	Madison Square Garden; 19,812	12–49
62	March 9	@ Denver	L 78–106	Alexey Shved (19)	Aldrich, Thomas (8)	Cleanthony Early (5)	Pepsi Center; 14,153	12–50
63	March 10	@ Utah	L 82–87	Alexey Shved (21)	Cole Aldrich (13)	Alexey Shved (7)	EnergySolutions Arena; 17,121	12–51
64	March 12	@ L.A. Lakers	W 101–94	Tim Hardaway Jr. (22)	Alexey Shved (11)	Alexey Shved (6)	Staples Center; 18,997	13–51
65	March 14	@ Golden State	L 94–125	Andrea Bargnani (18)	Cole Aldrich (9)	Aldrich, Shved (5)	Oracle Arena; 19,596	13–52
66	March 15	@ Phoenix	L 89–102	Bargnani, Shved (18)	Cole Aldrich (10)	Langston Galloway (4)	US Airways Center; 17,264	13–53
67	March 17	San Antonio	W 104–100 (OT)	Langston Galloway (22)	Lou Amundson (17)	Alexey Shved (7)	Madison Square Garden; 19,812	14–53
68	March 19	Minnesota	L 92–95 (OT)	Langston Galloway (21)	Lou Amundson (9)	Alexey Shved (6)	Madison Square Garden; 19,812	14–54
69	March 20	@ Philadelphia	L 81–97	Alexey Shved (25)	Bargnani, Shved (3)	Galloway, Larkin, Shved (3)	Wells Fargo Center; 10,079	14–55
70	March 22	@ Toronto	L 89–106	Lance Thomas (24)	Cole Aldrich (9)	Shane Larkin (8)	Air Canada Centre; 19,800	14–56
71	March 23	Memphis	L 82–103	Langston Galloway (19)	Aldrich, Galloway (7)	Shane Larkin (7)	Madison Square Garden; 19,812	14–57
72	March 25	L.A. Clippers	L 80–111	Cleanthony Early (18)	Jason Smith (8)	Jason Smith (4)	Madison Square Garden; 19,812	14–58
73	March 27	Boston	L 92–96	Andrea Bargnani (25)	Lou Amundson (9)	Galloway, Larkin (6)	Madison Square Garden; 19,812	14–59
74	March 28	@ Chicago	L 80–111	Andrea Bargnani (14)	Andrea Bargnani (7)	Shane Larkin (8)	United Center; 22,152	14–60

April : 3–5 (home: 1–4; road: 2–1)

Game	Date	Team	Score	High points	High rebounds	High assists	Location Attendance	Record
75	April 1	Brooklyn	L 98–100	Andrea Bargnani (22)	Lou Amundson (8)	Shane Larkin (7)	Madison Square Garden; 19,812	14–61
76	April 3	@ Washington	L 87–101	Ricky Ledo (21)	Lou Amundson (10)	Galloway, Ledo (3)	Verizon Center; 19,389	14–62
77	April 5	Philadelphia	W 101–91	Andrea Bargnani (25)	Shane Larkin (11)	Shane Larkin (7)	Madison Square Garden; 19,812	15–62
78	April 8	Indiana	L 86–101	Langston Galloway (19)	Bargnani & Smith (6)	Shane Larkin (4)	Madison Square Garden; 19,812	15–63
79	April 10	Milwaukee	L 91–99	Langston Galloway (20)	Lou Amundson (11)	Shane Larkin (5)	Madison Square Garden; 19,812	15–64
80	April 11	@ Orlando	W 80–79	Cole Aldrich (19)	Cole Aldrich (14)	Jason Smith (6)	Amway Center; 17,207	16–64
81	April 13	@ Atlanta	W 112–108	Langston Galloway (26)	Jason Smith (9)	Shane Larkin (7)	Philips Arena; 18,265	17–64
82	April 15	Detroit	L 90–112	Tim Hardaway Jr. (25)	Cole Aldrich (15)	Langston Galloway (7)	Madison Square Garden; 19,812	17–65

2014–15 season schedule

== Player statistics ==
Statistics (Summer League, preseason, and regular season)

Legend
GP	Games played	GS	Games started	MPG	Minutes per game
FG%	Field-goal percentage	3P%	3-point field-goal percentage	FT%	Free-throw percentage
RPG	Rebounds per game	APG	Assists per game	SPG	Steals per game
BPG	Blocks per game	PPG	Points per game

=== Summer League ===
New York Knicks statistics
Player	GP	GS	MPG	FG%	3P%	FT%	RPG	APG	SPG	BPG	PPG

=== Preseason ===
New York Knicks statistics
Player	GP	GS	MPG	FG%	3P%	FT%	RPG	APG	SPG	BPG	PPG

=== Regular season ===
Player	GP	GS	MPG	FG%	3P%	FT%	RPG	APG	SPG	BPG	PPG
Jason Smith	82	31	21.8	.434	.357	.830	4.0	1.7	.4	.5	8.0
Shane Larkin	76	22	24.5	.433	.302	.782	2.3	3.0	1.2	.1	6.2
Tim Hardaway Jr.	70	30	24.0	.389	.342	.801	2.2	1.8	.3	.2	11.5
Quincy Acy	68	22	18.9	.459	.300	.784	4.4	1.0	.4	.3	5.9
Cole Aldrich	61	16	16.0	.478		.781	5.5	1.2	.6	1.1	5.5
Travis Wear	51	1	13.2	.402	.367	.769	2.1	.8	.3	.2	3.9
Langston Galloway	45	41	32.4	.399	.352	.808	4.2	3.3	1.2	.3	11.8
Pablo Prigioni^{†}	43	3	18.5	.422	.374	.846	1.9	2.4	1.2	.0	4.7
José Calderón	42	42	30.2	.415	.415	.906	3.0	4.7	.7	.0	9.1
Lou Amundson^{†}	41	35	20.9	.432	.000	.463	6.0	1.6	.5	1.3	6.0
Carmelo Anthony	40	40	35.7	.444	.341	.797	6.6	3.1	1.0	.4	24.2
Lance Thomas^{†}	40	24	26.0	.434	.333	.742	3.0	1.2	.7	.2	8.3
Cleanthony Early	39	7	16.6	.355	.262	.750	2.5	.9	.6	.3	5.4
Amar'e Stoudemire^{†}	36	14	24.0	.543	.000	.740	6.8	1.0	.6	.9	12.0
Samuel Dalembert	32	21	17.0	.438		.700	5.3	.9	.4	1.3	4.0
Andrea Bargnani	29	22	27.1	.454	.366	.813	4.4	1.6	.1	.9	14.8
Iman Shumpert^{†}	24	24	26.0	.409	.348	.676	3.4	3.3	1.3	.1	9.3
J. R. Smith^{†}	24	6	25.8	.402	.356	.692	2.4	3.4	.8	.2	10.9
Alexey Shved^{†}	16	9	26.4	.403	.371	.780	4.6	3.6	.9	.3	14.8
Ricky Ledo^{†}	12	0	19.4	.356	.417	.750	2.8	1.5	.5	.1	7.4

- ^{†} Denotes player spent time with another team in the season. Stats reflect time with the Knicks only.

== Injuries ==
Player	Duration		Injury type	Games missed
Player	Start	End	Injury type	Games missed

== Roster ==
2014–15 New York Knicks roster
Players

Pos.	No.	Player	Height	Weight	DOB	From
PF	4	Quincy Acy	6 ft 7 in (2.01 m)	225 lb (102 kg)	1990-10-06	Baylor
C	45	Cole Aldrich	6 ft 11 in (2.11 m)	245 lb (111 kg)	1988-10-31	Kansas
PF	21	Lou Amundson	6 ft 9 in (2.06 m)	225 lb (102 kg)	1982-12-07	UNLV
SF	7	Carmelo Anthony	6 ft 8 in (2.03 m)	235 lb (107 kg)	1984-05-29	Syracuse
C	77	Andrea Bargnani	7 ft 0 in (2.13 m)	250 lb (113 kg)	1985-10-26	Italy
PG	3	José Calderón	6 ft 3 in (1.91 m)	211 lb (96 kg)	1981-09-28	Spain
SF	17	Cleanthony Early	6 ft 8 in (2.03 m)	219 lb (99 kg)	1991-04-17	Wichita State
PG	2	Langston Galloway	6 ft 2 in (1.88 m)	202 lb (92 kg)	1991-12-09	Saint Joseph's
SG	5	Tim Hardaway Jr.	6 ft 6 in (1.98 m)	205 lb (93 kg)	1992-03-16	Michigan
PG	0	Shane Larkin	5 ft 11 in (1.80 m)	176 lb (80 kg)	1992-10-02	Miami (FL)
SG	11	Ricky Ledo	6 ft 7 in (2.01 m)	195 lb (88 kg)	1992-09-10	South Kent HS (CT)
SG	1	Alexey Shved	6 ft 6 in (1.98 m)	190 lb (86 kg)	1988-12-16	Russia
C	14	Jason Smith	7 ft 0 in (2.13 m)	240 lb (109 kg)	1986-03-02	Colorado State
PF	42	Lance Thomas	6 ft 8 in (2.03 m)	225 lb (102 kg)	1988-04-24	Duke
SF	6	Travis Wear	6 ft 10 in (2.08 m)	230 lb (104 kg)	1990-09-21	UCLA

Coaches
Head coach
- Derek Fisher
Assistant(s)
- Jim Cleamons
- Rasheed Hazzard
- Brian Keefe
- Josh Longstaff
- Kurt Rambis (associate HC)

Legend
- (DP) Unsigned draft pick
- (FA) Free agent
- (S) Suspended
- Injured

Roster
Updated: April 8, 2015

=== Roster Notes ===
- Small forward Carmelo Anthony played 40 games (his last game being on February 9, 2015) but missed the rest of the season after undergoing left knee surgery to repair a patella tendon.
- Point guard José Calderón played 42 games (his last game being on February 25, 2015) but missed the rest of the season after undergoing a procedure on his strained left Achilles tendon.

== Transactions ==
=== Trades ===
June 25, 2014	To New York Knicks José Calderón; Samuel Dalembert; Wayne Ellington; Shane Larkin; 2014 second-round pick (Thanasis Antetokounmpo); 2014 second-round pick (Cleanthony Early)	To Dallas Mavericks Tyson Chandler; Raymond Felton

June 27, 2014	To New York Knicks Louis Labeyrie	To Indiana Pacers Cash considerations

August 6, 2014	To New York Knicks Quincy Acy; Travis Outlaw	To Sacramento Kings Wayne Ellington; Jeremy Tyler

October 27, 2014	To New York Knicks Arnett Moultrie	To Philadelphia 76ers Travis Outlaw; 2019 second-round pick

February 5, 2015	To New York Knicks Lou Amundson (from Cleveland); Alex Kirk (from Cleveland); Lance Thomas (from Oklahoma City); 2019 second-round pick (from Cleveland)	To Oklahoma City Thunder Dion Waiters (from Cleveland)	To Cleveland Cavaliers Iman Shumpert (from New York); J. R. Smith (from New York); 2015 first-round pick (from Oklahoma City)

February 19, 2015	To New York Knicks Alexey Shved; 2017 second-round pick (Ognjen Jaramaz); 2019 second-round pick	To Houston Rockets Pablo Prigioni

=== Free agents ===
==== Re-signed ====
Player	Signed	Contract	Ref.

==== Additions ====
Player	Signed	Former team	Ref.

==== Subtractions ====
Player	Reason left	Date	New team	Ref.
Amar'e Stoudemire	Released from contract	February 18, 2015	Dallas Mavericks	

== Awards ==
Player	Award	Date awarded	Ref.
