= Lanston =

Lanston may refer to:

- Tolbert Lanston (1844–1913), the American founder of monotype.
- Lanston Monotype Company
- Lansoprazole, a medication which reduces stomach acid

== See also ==
- Langston
