= Langstone =

Langstone may refer to:

Places:

- Langstone, Devon, a location in England
- Langstone, Hampshire, England
  - Langstone (UK Parliament constituency)
- Langstone, Newport, Wales

People:

- Frank Langstone
- John Langstone
- Michelle Langstone

== See also ==
- Langston (disambiguation)
