= Langston Hughes (disambiguation) =

Langston Hughes (1901–1967) was an American poet, social activist, novelist, playwright, and columnist.

These places were named in memorial to him:

- Langston Hughes High School, a public secondary school in Fairburn, Georgia
- Langston Hughes Performing Arts Center, an arts venue in Seattle, Washington
- Langston Hughes, Baltimore, a neighborhood in Baltimore, Maryland
