= Langston Galloway =

American basketball player (born 1991)

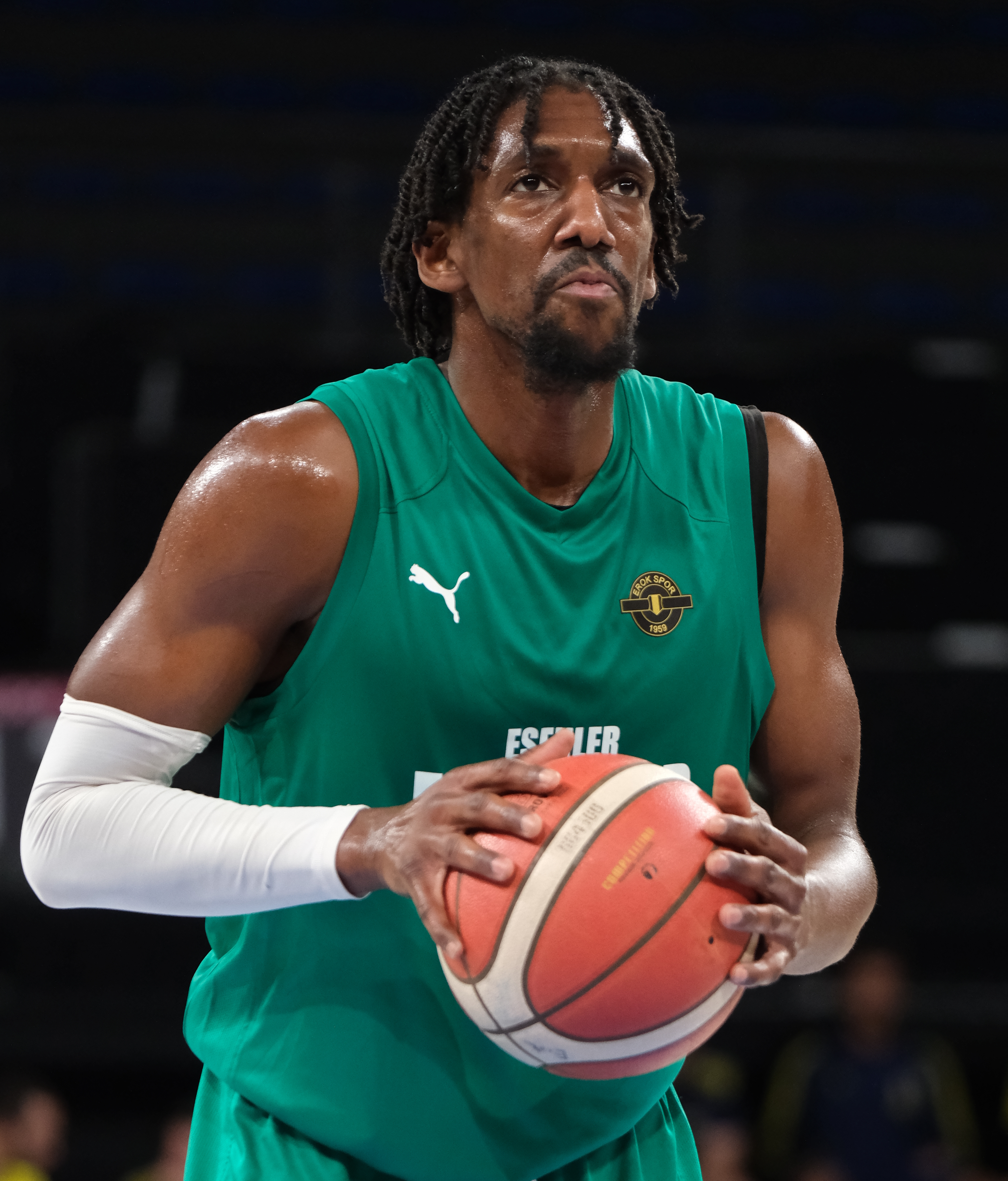
- Galloway with Esenler Erokspor in 2025

No. 9 – Pallacanestro Trieste
- Position: Shooting guard / point guard
- League: LBA

Personal information
- Born: December 9, 1991 (age 34) Baton Rouge, Louisiana, U.S.
- Listed height: 6 ft 1 in (1.85 m)
- Listed weight: 200 lb (91 kg)

Career information
- High school: Christian Life Academy (Baton Rouge, Louisiana)
- College: Saint Joseph's (2010–2014)
- NBA draft: 2014: undrafted
- Playing career: 2014–present

Career history
- 2014–2015: Westchester Knicks
- 2015–2016: New York Knicks
- 2016–2017: New Orleans Pelicans
- 2017: Sacramento Kings
- 2017–2020: Detroit Pistons
- 2020–2021: Phoenix Suns
- 2021: College Park Skyhawks
- 2021–2022: Brooklyn Nets
- 2022: Milwaukee Bucks
- 2022–2023: College Park Skyhawks
- 2023–2024: Reggio Emilia
- 2024–2025: Trapani Shark
- 2025–2026: Esenler Erokspor
- 2026–present: Pallacanestro Trieste

Career highlights
- NBA All-Rookie Second Team (2015); First-team All-Atlantic 10 (2014); Second-team All-Atlantic 10 (2012); Atlantic 10 All-Rookie Team (2011)
- Stats at NBA.com
- Stats at Basketball Reference
Medals
Men's basketball
Representing the United States
FIBA AmeriCup
Bronze medal – third place	2025 Managua

Langston Arnold Galloway (born December 9, 1991) is an American professional basketball player for Pallacanestro Trieste of the Italian Lega Basket Serie A (LBA). He played college basketball for the Saint Joseph's Hawks.

== High school career ==
Galloway attended Christian Life Academy in Baton Rouge, Louisiana, where he was a two-time District 7 1-A Player of the Year. As a junior in 2008–09, he averaged 21.3 points, five rebounds and three assists per game. As a senior in 2009–10, he averaged 26.2 points, five assists and five steals per game as he helped CLA win the Class 1A title and earned Class 1A All-State first team honors.

== College career ==
In his freshman season at Saint Joseph's, Galloway earned Atlantic 10 All-Rookie team and Philadelphia Big 5 Rookie of the Year honors. He was also named the Hawks' Co-MVP as he shared the John P. Hilferty Award with Carl Jones. In 33 games, he averaged 12.8 points, 5.5 rebounds, 2.9 assists and 1.7 steals in 34.3 minutes per game.

In his sophomore season, he was named to the All-Atlantic 10 second team and All-Big 5 first team. In addition, he received the John P. Hilferty Award as SJU's MVP for the second straight year. In 34 games, he averaged 15.5 points, 4.5 rebounds, 2.2 assists and 1.0 steals in 35.7 minutes per game.

In his junior season, he was named to the inaugural All-State NABC Good Works Team for his community involvement while also being named to the All-Big 5 second team. In 32 games, he averaged 13.8 points, 3.6 rebounds, 2.3 assists and 1.4 steals in 35.7 minutes per game.

In his senior season, he was named to the All-Atlantic 10 first team, All-Big 5 first team, NABC All-District 4 first team, and the Atlantic 10 All-Championship team for the conference champion Hawks. He was also co-recipient of the John P. Hilferty Award as SJU's MVP, earning Most Valuable honors for the third time. In 34 games, he averaged 17.7 points, 4.3 rebounds, 1.6 assists and 1.1 steals in 36.2 minutes per game.

Galloway finished his college career as the second all-time leading scorer in Hawk history (after Jameer Nelson) with 1,991 points, as well as the all-time leader in career three-pointers with 343.

== Professional career ==
=== Westchester Knicks (2014–2015) ===
After going undrafted in the 2014 NBA draft, Galloway spent Summer League and preseason with the New York Knicks. He joined New York's NBA Development League affiliate team, the Westchester Knicks, in November.

=== New York Knicks (2015–2016) ===
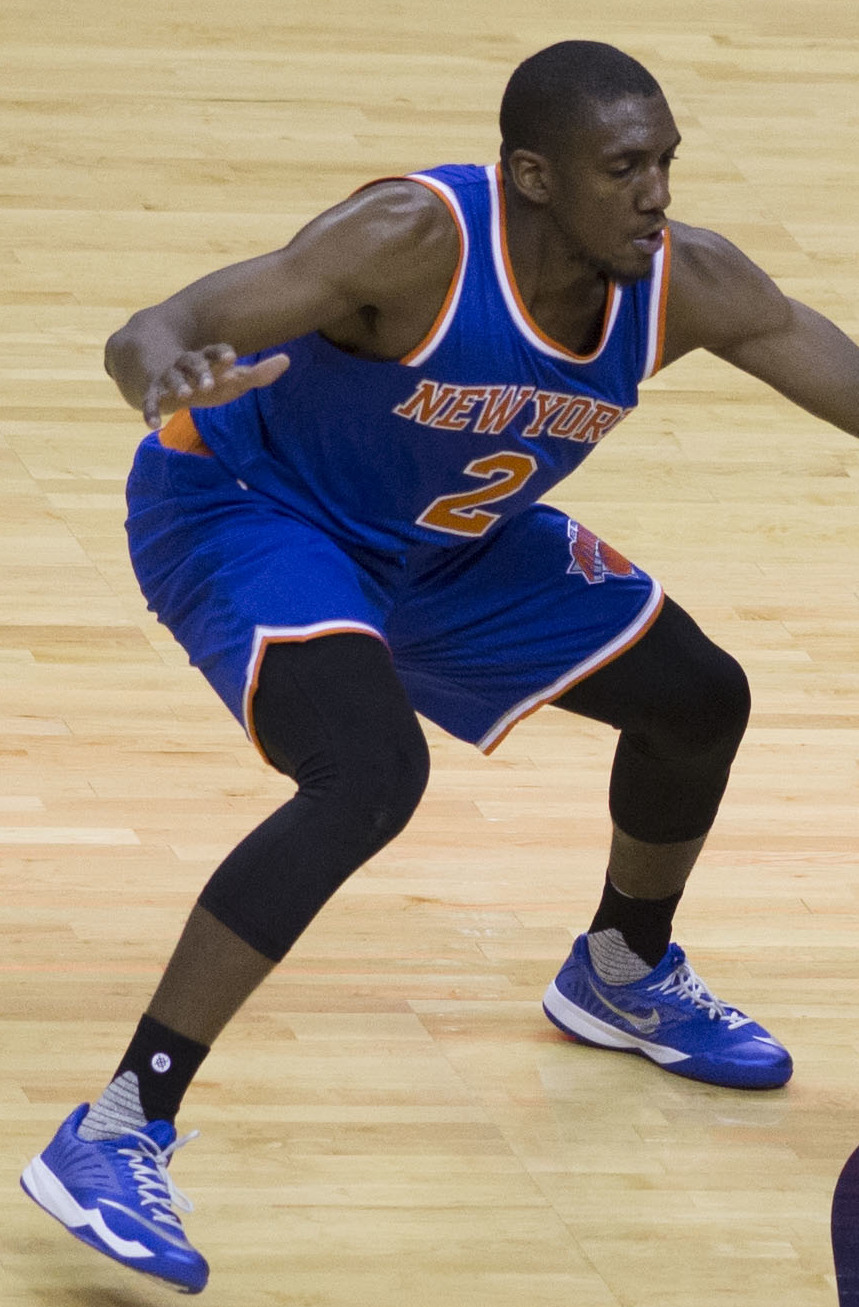
Galloway with the New York Knicks in 2015

After two months with Westchester, Galloway was called up by New York on January 7, 2015, who signed him to a 10-day contract. He made his NBA debut that night, recording seven points, two rebounds, three assists and one steal in a 101–91 loss to the Washington Wizards. He made his second appearance for the Knicks the following night, scoring 19 points in a 120–96 loss to the Houston Rockets. He signed a second 10-day contract with the Knicks on January 17, and then a partially guaranteed, two-year deal on January 27. On April 13, he scored a career-high 26 points and hit all six of his 3-pointer attempts in a 112–108 win over the Atlanta Hawks. At the season's end, he was named to the NBA All-Rookie Second Team, becoming the first undrafted player in Knicks history to make an NBA All-Rookie team.

By mid-November of the 2015–16 season, Galloway led the team and ranked fourth in the NBA in fourth-quarter minutes played, having earned trust and faith from coach Derek Fisher. He was also among the NBA's leaders in 3-point field goal percentage over the first three weeks of the season, shooting about 50% from distance. On January 26, 2016, he scored a season-high 21 points in a 128–122 overtime loss to the Oklahoma City Thunder. He appeared in all 82 games for the Knicks in 2015–16.

=== New Orleans Pelicans (2016–2017) ===
On July 21, 2016, Galloway signed with the New Orleans Pelicans. On November 19, he scored 23 points and tied a career high with six 3-pointers in a 121–116 overtime win over the Sacramento Kings. On December 5, he hit six 3-pointers and scored a season-high 26 points in a 110–108 double-overtime loss to the Memphis Grizzlies.

=== Sacramento Kings (2017) ===
On February 20, 2017, Galloway was traded alongside Tyreke Evans, Buddy Hield and 2017 first round and second round draft picks to the Sacramento Kings in exchange for DeMarcus Cousins and Omri Casspi.

=== Detroit Pistons (2017–2020) ===
On July 6, 2017, Galloway signed a three-year, $21 million contract with the Detroit Pistons. The 2017–18 season saw Galloway record the lowest field-goal and 3-point percentages of his career, as well as the lowest average minutes of career. He appeared in just 58 games, with him not playing in 12-of-14 games from March 7 to April 4. On December 12, he scored a season-high 18 points in a 103–84 loss to the Denver Nuggets.

On December 9, 2018, Galloway scored a season-high 24 points in a 116–108 loss to the New Orleans Pelicans.

=== Phoenix Suns (2020–2021) ===
On November 30, 2020, Galloway signed with the Phoenix Suns. Galloway reached the 2021 NBA Finals with the Suns, but Phoenix lost the series in 6 games to the Milwaukee Bucks.

=== College Park Skyhawks (2021) ===
On September 24, 2021, Galloway signed with the Golden State Warriors. However, he was waived on October 9 after three preseason games. On December 13, he signed with the College Park Skyhawks of the NBA G League where he played one game.

=== Brooklyn Nets (2021–2022) ===
On December 16, 2021, Galloway signed a 10-day contract with the Brooklyn Nets. He signed a second 10-day contract with the team on December 26.

=== Milwaukee Bucks (2022) ===
On January 7, 2022, Galloway signed a 10-day contract with the Milwaukee Bucks.

=== Return to College Park (2022–2023) ===
On January 21, 2022, Galloway was reacquired by the College Park Skyhawks.

On September 23, 2022, Galloway was signed with the Indiana Pacers on a one-year non guaranteed deal. He was waived on October 15, and he re-signed with the Skyhawks on November 15.

=== UnaHotels Reggio Emilia (2023–2024) ===
On August 3, 2023, Galloway signed with UnaHotels Reggio Emilia of the Italian Lega Basket Serie A.

=== Trapani Shark (2024–2025) ===
On August 1, 2024, Galloway signed with Trapani Shark of the Italian Lega Basket Serie A.

=== Esenler Erokspor (2025–2026) ===
On July 8, 2025, Galloway signed with Esenler Erokspor of the Basketbol Süper Ligi (BSL).

=== Pallacanestro Trieste (2026–present) ===
On September 9, 2026, Galloway signed with Pallacanestro Trieste of the Italian Lega Basket Serie A.

== Career statistics ==
Legend
GP	Games played	GS	Games started	MPG	Minutes per game
FG%	Field goal percentage	3P%	3-point field goal percentage	FT%	Free throw percentage
RPG	Rebounds per game	APG	Assists per game	SPG	Steals per game
BPG	Blocks per game	PPG	Points per game	**Bold**	Career high
*	Led the league

=== NBA ===
==== Regular season ====
Year	Team	GP	GS	MPG	FG%	3P%	FT%	RPG	APG	SPG	BPG	PPG
2014–15	New York	45	**41**	**32.4**	.399	.352	.808	**4.2**	**3.3**	**1.2**	**.3**	**11.8**
2015–16	New York	**82***	7	24.8	.393	.344	.754	3.5	2.5	.9	**.3**	7.6
2016–17	New Orleans	55	0	20.4	.374	.377	.769	2.2	1.2	.7	.1	8.6
2016–17	Sacramento	19	2	19.7	.404	**.475**	.917	1.8	1.5	.3	.1	6.0
2017–18	Detroit	58	2	14.9	.371	.344	.805	1.6	1.0	.6	.1	6.2
2018–19	Detroit	80	4	21.8	.388	.355	.844	2.1	.5	.1	.1	8.4
2019–20	Detroit	66	6	25.8	.435	.399	.859	2.3	1.5	.7	.2	10.3
2020–21	Phoenix	40	0	11.0	**.449**	.424	**.957**	1.1	.7	.2	.0	4.8
2021–22	Brooklyn	4	0	14.5	.385	.250	–	2.0	1.3	.0	.0	3.0
2021–22	Milwaukee	3	0	16.2	.077	.000	–	3.3	2.3	.3	.0	.7
Career		452	62	21.8	.397	.368	.816	2.4	1.6	.7	.1	8.1

==== Playoffs ====
Year	Team	GP	GS	MPG	FG%	3P%	FT%	RPG	APG	SPG	BPG	PPG
2019	Detroit	**4**	0	**27.5**	**.324**	**.360**	—	**3.8**	**1.0**	**.5**	**1.0**	**7.8**
2021	Phoenix	2	0	7.5	.143	.000	.000	1.0	.5	.0	.5	1.0
Career		6	0	20.8	.293	.333	.000	2.8	.8	.3	.8	5.5

=== College ===
Year	Team	GP	GS	MPG	FG%	3P%	FT%	RPG	APG	SPG	BPG	PPG
2010–11	Saint Joseph's	33	33	34.3	.399	.392	**.887**	**5.5**	**2.9**	**1.7**	.5	12.8
2011–12	Saint Joseph's	**34**	33	35.7	**.488**	**.466**	.785	4.5	2.2	1.0	**.6**	15.5
2012–13	Saint Joseph's	32	32	35.7	.414	.394	.772	3.6	2.3	1.4	.3	13.8
2013–14	Saint Joseph's	**34**	**34**	**36.2**	.444	.443	.826	4.3	1.6	1.1	.5	**17.7**
Career		133	132	35.5	.438	.426	.821	4.5	2.2	1.3	.5	15.0

== Personal life ==
Galloway is the son of Larry and Jeralyn Galloway. His uncle, Geoff Arnold, was his assistant coach at Saint Joseph's before being named assistant coach of Rider University.
