= Michael Langston =

American computer scientist

Michael Allen Langston is a professor of electrical engineering and computer science at the University of Tennessee. In several publications with Michael Fellows in the late 1980s, he showed that the Robertson–Seymour theorem could be used to prove the existence of a polynomial-time algorithm for problems such as linkless embedding without allowing the algorithm itself to be explicitly constructed; this work was foundational to the field of parameterized complexity. He has also collaborated with scientists at Oak Ridge National Laboratory on the computational analysis of genomics data and reconstruction of gene regulatory networks.

Langston received his doctorate (PhD) in 1981 at Texas A&M University in computing science. His dissertation was Processor scheduling with improved heuristic algorithms. He worked at Washington State University, the University of Illinois, and the University of Maryland Global Campus Europe before taking his present position at the University of Tennessee. He has also served in the United States Army as a paratrooper and officer in the 17th Cavalry Regiment and as personnel database manager for VII Corps.

His honors include the Commendation Medal, U.S. Army, 1979; the Distinguished Teaching Award, Texas A&M University, 1981; the Distinguished Service Prize, ACM Special Interest Group on Algorithms and Computation Theory, 2001; and the Chancellor's Award for Research and Creative Achievement, University of Tennessee, 1994 and 2014.
