= 2014–15 NBA season =

69th NBA season

- League: National Basketball Association
- Sport: Basketball
- Duration: October 28, 2014 – April 15, 2015; April 18, 2015 – May 27, 2015 (Playoffs); June 4, 2015 – June 16, 2015 (Finals)
- Games: 82
- Teams: 30
- TV partner(s): ABC, TNT, ESPN, NBA TV

Draft
- Top draft pick: Andrew Wiggins
- Picked by: Cleveland Cavaliers

Regular season
- Top seed: Golden State Warriors
- Season MVP: Stephen Curry (Golden State)
- Top scorer: Russell Westbrook (Oklahoma City)

Playoffs
- Eastern champions: Cleveland Cavaliers
- Eastern runners-up: Atlanta Hawks
- Western champions: Golden State Warriors
- Western runners-up: Houston Rockets

Finals
- Champions: Golden State Warriors
- Runners-up: Cleveland Cavaliers
- Finals MVP: Andre Iguodala (Golden State)

NBA seasons
- ← 2013–14 2015–16 →

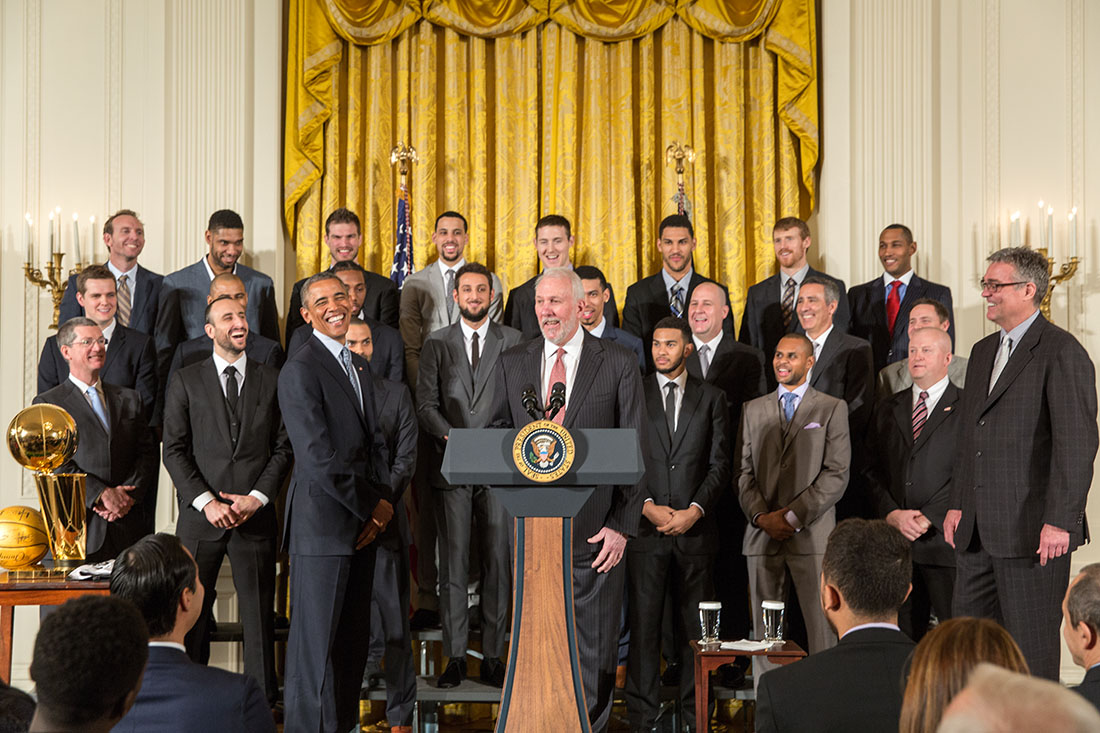
San Antonio Spurs NBA champions with President Obama in the East Room White House January, 2015

The 2014–15 NBA season was the 69th season of the National Basketball Association (NBA). The NBA draft took place on June 26, 2014, at Barclays Center in Brooklyn, where Andrew Wiggins was selected first overall by the Cleveland Cavaliers. The regular season began on October 28, 2014, when the defending NBA champion San Antonio Spurs hosted the first game against the Dallas Mavericks at AT&T Center in San Antonio. The 2015 NBA All-Star Game was played on February 15, 2015, at Madison Square Garden in New York City, with the West defeating the East 163–158. Oklahoma City's Russell Westbrook won the NBA All-Star Game Most Valuable Player Award. The regular season ended on April 15, 2015, and the playoffs began on April 18, 2015, and ended with the 2015 NBA Finals on June 16, 2015, after the Golden State Warriors defeated the Cleveland Cavaliers in six games to win their fourth NBA title and first since 1975. The Charlotte Bobcats played their first official game as the Charlotte Hornets since 2002.

== Transactions ==
=== Retirement ===
- On June 10, 2014, Derek Fisher signed a five-year, $25 million deal as the head coach of the New York Knicks, instead of playing one more season with the Oklahoma City Thunder. During his eighteen seasons in the league as a player, he won five NBA championships, all with the Los Angeles Lakers (2000–2002 and 2009–2010).
- On June 15, 2014, Shane Battier announced his retirement immediately following the Miami Heat's loss in Game 5 of the 2014 NBA Finals. He was 35, and had played for thirteen seasons. He won back-to-back NBA championships with the Heat (2012–2013)
- On September 9, 2014, Chauncey Billups announced his retirement after 17 years of playing; the last team he played for was the Detroit Pistons, and he won a championship with them in 2004 as well as a Finals MVP that same year.
- On February 26, 2015, Richard Hamilton officially announced his retirement after 14 seasons from NBA with one championship ring with the Detroit Pistons in 2004.
- On March 21, 2015, Steve Nash officially announced his retirement after 18 seasons with the Phoenix Suns, Dallas Mavericks and Los Angeles Lakers. Nash was contracted by the Lakers, but was sidelined by season-ending injuries during pre-season.

=== Free agency ===
Free agency negotiations began on July 1, 2014, when players began to sign starting on July 10, after the July moratorium ended. Some notable moments from free agency are:

- On June 23, 2014, the New York Knicks announced that Carmelo Anthony would enter free agency.
- On June 23, 2014, the Miami Heat announced that LeBron James would become a free agent.
- In late June 2014, Dwyane Wade and Chris Bosh opted out of their contracts with the Miami Heat.
- On July 11, 2014, LeBron James announced that he would return to the Cleveland Cavaliers.
- On July 12, 2014, Pau Gasol reportedly was joining the Chicago Bulls.
- On July 12, 2014, Isaiah Thomas signed with the Phoenix Suns in a sign and trade.
- On July 12, 2014, Chris Bosh re-signed with the Miami Heat for a five-year, $118 million contract.
- On July 13, 2014, Carmelo Anthony announced that he would return to the New York Knicks.
- On July 13, 2014, Paul Pierce signed with the Washington Wizards for a two-year, $10 million contract.
- On July 15, 2014, Dwyane Wade re-signed with the Miami Heat for a 1-year, $22 million contract.

=== Coaching changes ===
Coaching changes
Off-season
Team	2013–14 season	2014–15 season
New York Knicks	Mike Woodson	Derek Fisher
Minnesota Timberwolves	Rick Adelman	Flip Saunders
Milwaukee Bucks	Larry Drew	Jason Kidd
Brooklyn Nets	Jason Kidd	Lionel Hollins
Utah Jazz	Tyrone Corbin	Quin Snyder
Los Angeles Lakers	Mike D'Antoni	Byron Scott
Golden State Warriors	Mark Jackson	Steve Kerr
Cleveland Cavaliers	Mike Brown	David Blatt
Detroit Pistons	John Loyer (interim)	Stan Van Gundy
In-season
Team	Outgoing coach	Incoming coach
Sacramento Kings	Michael Malone	Tyrone Corbin (interim)
Sacramento Kings	Tyrone Corbin (interim)	George Karl
Orlando Magic	Jacque Vaughn	James Borrego (interim)
Denver Nuggets	Brian Shaw	Melvin Hunt (interim)

==== Off-season ====
- On April 21, 2014, the New York Knicks fired head coach Mike Woodson after two years with the team.
- On April 21, 2014, the Minnesota Timberwolves head coach Rick Adelman announced his retirement from coaching.
- On April 21, 2014, the Utah Jazz opted not to renew head coach Tyrone Corbin's contract after over three full seasons with the team.
- On April 30, 2014, the Los Angeles Lakers head coach Mike D'Antoni resigned after nearly two years with the team.
- On May 6, 2014, the Golden State Warriors fired head coach Mark Jackson after three years with the team.
- On May 12, 2014, the Cleveland Cavaliers fired head coach Mike Brown after one year of his second tenure with the team.
- On May 14, 2014, the Detroit Pistons hired Stan Van Gundy as the head coach.
- On May 19, 2014, the Golden State Warriors hired Steve Kerr as head coach.
- On June 5, 2014, the Minnesota Timberwolves announced that Flip Saunders returned to the Timberwolves as head coach.
- On June 6, 2014, the Utah Jazz hired Quin Snyder, formerly an assistant with the Atlanta Hawks, as head coach.
- On June 10, 2014, the New York Knicks hired Derek Fisher as head coach.
- On June 20, 2014, the Cleveland Cavaliers hired David Blatt as head coach.
- On June 30, 2014, the Milwaukee Bucks traded two future second-round picks to the Brooklyn Nets for their head coach Jason Kidd and fired head coach Larry Drew.
- On July 2, 2014, the Brooklyn Nets hired Lionel Hollins as head coach.
- On July 29, 2014, the Los Angeles Lakers hired Byron Scott as head coach.

==== In-season ====
- On December 15, 2014, the Sacramento Kings fired head coach Michael Malone and replaced him with Tyrone Corbin on an interim basis.
- On February 5, 2015, the Orlando Magic fired Jacque Vaughn of his head coaching duties and replaced him with James Borrego on an interim basis.
- On February 12, 2015, the Sacramento Kings demoted Tyrone Corbin from his coaching duties and replaced him with former Coach of the Year George Karl.
- On March 3, 2015, the Denver Nuggets fired head coach Brian Shaw, with Melvin Hunt taking over as interim coach.

== Preseason ==
The preseason began on October 4, 2014, and ended on October 24, 2014.

== Regular season ==
The regular season began on October 28, 2014, with the defending NBA champions San Antonio Spurs hosting the first game against the Dallas Mavericks. The regular season ended on April 15, 2015. Christmas Day games were played on December 25, 2014. The NBA is mulling a week-long All-Star break in February 2015, and the full schedule was released during a one-hour schedule release special on August 13, 2014, at 6:00 p.m. EDT on NBA TV.

=== Standings ===
==== By division ====
Eastern Conference

Atlantic Division	W	L	PCT	GB	Home	Road	Div	GP
y-Toronto Raptors	49	33	.598	–	27‍–‍14	22‍–‍19	11–5	82
x-Boston Celtics	40	42	.488	9.0	21‍–‍20	19‍–‍22	12–4	82
x-Brooklyn Nets	38	44	.463	11.0	19‍–‍22	19‍–‍22	10–6	82
Philadelphia 76ers	18	64	.220	31.0	12‍–‍29	6‍–‍35	2–14	82
New York Knicks	17	65	.207	32.0	10‍–‍31	7‍–‍34	5–11	82

Central Division	W	L	PCT	GB	Home	Road	Div	GP
y-Cleveland Cavaliers	53	29	.646	–	31‍–‍10	22‍–‍19	11–5	82
x-Chicago Bulls	50	32	.610	3.0	27‍–‍14	23‍–‍18	8–8	82
x-Milwaukee Bucks	41	41	.500	12.0	23‍–‍18	18‍–‍23	7–9	82
Indiana Pacers	38	44	.463	15.0	23‍–‍18	15‍–‍26	8–8	82
Detroit Pistons	32	50	.390	21.0	18‍–‍23	14‍–‍27	6–10	82

Southeast Division	W	L	PCT	GB	Home	Road	Div	GP
c-Atlanta Hawks	60	22	.732	–	35‍–‍6	25‍–‍16	12–4	82
x-Washington Wizards	46	36	.561	14.0	29‍–‍12	17‍–‍24	10–6	82
Miami Heat	37	45	.451	23.0	20‍–‍21	17‍–‍24	6–10	82
Charlotte Hornets	33	49	.402	27.0	19‍–‍22	14‍–‍27	8–8	82
Orlando Magic	25	57	.305	35.0	13‍–‍28	12‍–‍29	4–12	82

Western Conference

Northwest Division	W	L	PCT	GB	Home	Road	Div	GP
y-Portland Trail Blazers	51	31	.622	–	32‍–‍9	19‍–‍22	11–5	82
Oklahoma City Thunder	45	37	.549	6.0	29‍–‍12	16‍–‍25	10–6	82
Utah Jazz	38	44	.463	13.0	21‍–‍20	17‍–‍24	9–7	82
Denver Nuggets	30	52	.366	21.0	19‍–‍22	11‍–‍30	6–10	82
Minnesota Timberwolves	16	66	.195	35.0	9‍–‍32	7‍–‍34	4–12	82

Pacific Division	W	L	PCT	GB	Home	Road	Div	GP
z-Golden State Warriors	67	15	.817	–	39‍–‍2	28‍–‍13	13–3	82
x-Los Angeles Clippers	56	26	.683	11.0	30‍–‍11	26‍–‍15	12–4	82
Phoenix Suns	39	43	.476	28.0	22‍–‍19	17‍–‍24	6–10	82
Sacramento Kings	29	53	.354	38.0	18‍–‍23	11‍–‍30	7–9	82
Los Angeles Lakers	21	61	.256	46.0	12‍–‍29	9‍–‍32	2–14	82

Southwest Division	W	L	PCT	GB	Home	Road	Div	GP
y-Houston Rockets	56	26	.683	–	30‍–‍11	26‍–‍15	8–8	82
x-Memphis Grizzlies	55	27	.671	1.0	31‍–‍10	24‍–‍17	9–7	82
x-San Antonio Spurs	55	27	.671	1.0	33‍–‍8	22‍–‍19	8–8	82
x-Dallas Mavericks	50	32	.610	6.0	27‍–‍14	23‍–‍18	7–9	82
x-New Orleans Pelicans	45	37	.549	11.0	28‍–‍13	17‍–‍24	8–8	82

==== By conference ====
Eastern Conference
#	Team	W	L	PCT	GB	GP
1	c-Atlanta Hawks *	60	22	.732	–	82
2	y-Cleveland Cavaliers *	53	29	.646	7.0	82
3	x-Chicago Bulls	50	32	.610	10.0	82
4	y-Toronto Raptors *	49	33	.598	11.0	82
5	x-Washington Wizards	46	36	.561	14.0	82
6	x-Milwaukee Bucks	41	41	.500	19.0	82
7	x-Boston Celtics	40	42	.488	20.0	82
8	x-Brooklyn Nets	38	44	.463	22.0	82
9	Indiana Pacers	38	44	.463	22.0	82
10	Miami Heat	37	45	.451	23.0	82
11	Charlotte Hornets	33	49	.402	27.0	82
12	Detroit Pistons	32	50	.390	28.0	82
13	Orlando Magic	25	57	.305	35.0	82
14	Philadelphia 76ers	18	64	.220	42.0	82
15	New York Knicks	17	65	.207	43.0	82

Western Conference
#	Team	W	L	PCT	GB	GP
1	z-Golden State Warriors *	67	15	.817	–	82
2	y-Houston Rockets *	56	26	.683	11.0	82
3	x-Los Angeles Clippers	56	26	.683	11.0	82
4	y-Portland Trail Blazers *	51	31	.622	16.0	82
5	x-Memphis Grizzlies	55	27	.671	12.0	82
6	x-San Antonio Spurs	55	27	.671	12.0	82
7	x-Dallas Mavericks	50	32	.610	17.0	82
8	x-New Orleans Pelicans	45	37	.549	22.0	82
9	Oklahoma City Thunder	45	37	.549	22.0	82
10	Phoenix Suns	39	43	.476	28.0	82
11	Utah Jazz	38	44	.463	29.0	82
12	Denver Nuggets	30	52	.366	37.0	82
13	Sacramento Kings	29	53	.354	38.0	82
14	Los Angeles Lakers	21	61	.256	46.0	82
15	Minnesota Timberwolves	16	66	.195	51.0	82

Notes

- z – Clinched home court advantage for the entire playoffs
- c – Clinched home court advantage for the conference playoffs
- y – Clinched division title
- x – Clinched playoff spot
- * – Division champion

==== Tiebreakers ====
===== Eastern Conference =====
- Brooklyn clinched #8 seed over Indiana based on head-to-head record (2–1).

===== Western Conference =====
- Houston clinched the #2 seed over the Los Angeles Clippers as Houston won the Southwest Division while the L.A. Clippers finished 2nd in the Pacific Division.
- Memphis clinched the #5 seed over San Antonio based on a better divisional record (9–7 to 8–8).
- New Orleans clinched the #8 seed over Oklahoma City based on head-to-head record (3–1).

== Playoffs ==
The 2015 NBA playoffs began on April 18, 2015, and concluded with the 2015 NBA Finals which began on June 4, 2015, on ABC. ESPN broadcast the Western Conference Finals and TNT televised the Eastern Conference Finals. ABC broadcast the NBA Finals.

=== Bracket ===
Teams in bold advanced to the next round. The numbers to the left of each team indicate the team's seeding in its conference, and the numbers to the right indicate the number of games the team won in that round. The division champions are marked by an asterisk. Teams with home court advantage are shown in Italics.

First Round	Conference Semifinals
**E1**	**Atlanta***	**4**
E8	Brooklyn	2
**E1**	**Atlanta***	**4**
E5	Washington	2
E4	Toronto*	0
**E5**	**Washington**	**4**
**Eastern Conference**
**E3**	**Chicago**	**4**
E6	Milwaukee	2
E3	Chicago	2
**E2**	**Cleveland***	**4**
**E2**	**Cleveland***	**4**
E7	Boston	0
**W1**	**Golden State***	**4**
W8	New Orleans	0
**W1**	**Golden State***	**4**
W5	Memphis	2
W4	Portland*	1
**W5**	**Memphis**	**4**
**Western Conference**
**W3**	**LA Clippers**	**4**
W6	San Antonio	3
W3	LA Clippers	3
**W2**	**Houston***	**4**
**W2**	**Houston***	**4**
W7	Dallas	1

Conference Finals
E1	Atlanta*	0
**E2**	**Cleveland***	**4**
**W1**	**Golden State***	**4**
W2	Houston*	1

NBA Finals
E2	Cleveland*	2
**W1**	**Golden State***	**4**

- * Division winner
- **Bold** Series winner
- Italics Team with home-court advantage

== Statistics leaders ==
=== Individual statistic leaders ===
Listed below are the stat leaders in the league:

Category	Player	Team	Statistics
Points per game	Russell Westbrook	Oklahoma City Thunder	28.1
Rebounds per game	DeAndre Jordan	Los Angeles Clippers	15.0
Assists per game	Chris Paul	Los Angeles Clippers	10.2
Steals per game	Kawhi Leonard	San Antonio Spurs	2.31
Blocks per game	Anthony Davis	New Orleans Pelicans	2.94
Turnovers per game	Russell Westbrook	Oklahoma City Thunder	4.4
Fouls per game	DeMarcus Cousins	Sacramento Kings	4.1
Minutes per game	Jimmy Butler	Chicago Bulls	38.7
FG%	DeAndre Jordan	Los Angeles Clippers	71.0%
FT%	Stephen Curry	Golden State Warriors	91.4%
3FG%	Kyle Korver	Atlanta Hawks	49.2%
Efficiency per game	Anthony Davis	New Orleans Pelicans	30.89
Double-doubles	Pau Gasol	Chicago Bulls	54
Triple-doubles	Russell Westbrook	Oklahoma City Thunder	11

=== Individual game highs ===
Category	Player	Team	Statistics
Points	Kyrie Irving	Cleveland Cavaliers	57
Rebounds	DeAndre Jordan	Los Angeles Clippers	27
Rebounds	Andre Drummond	Detroit Pistons	27
Assists	Brandon Jennings	Detroit Pistons	21
Steals	Mario Chalmers	Miami Heat	8
Blocks	Hassan Whiteside	Miami Heat	12
Three Pointers	Klay Thompson	Golden State Warriors	11
Three Pointers	Kyrie Irving	Cleveland Cavaliers	11

=== Team statistic leaders ===
Category	Team	Statistics
Points per game	Golden State Warriors	110.0
Rebounds per game	Oklahoma City Thunder	47.5
Assists per game	Golden State Warriors	27.4
Steals per game	Milwaukee Bucks	9.6
Steals per game	Philadelphia 76ers	9.6
Blocks per game	New Orleans Pelicans	6.2
Blocked attempts per game	Sacramento Kings	6.2
Turnovers per game	Philadelphia 76ers	17.7
Fouls per game	Denver Nuggets	23.0
Fouls drawn per game	Sacramento Kings	23.9
FG%	Golden State Warriors	47.8%
FT%	Portland Trail Blazers	80.1%
3FG%	Golden State Warriors	39.8%
+/−	Golden State Warriors	10.1

== Awards ==
=== Yearly Awards ===
- Most Valuable Player: Stephen Curry, Golden State Warriors
- Defensive Player of the Year: Kawhi Leonard, San Antonio Spurs
- Rookie of the Year: Andrew Wiggins, Minnesota Timberwolves
- Sixth Man of the Year: Louis Williams, Toronto Raptors
- Most Improved Player: Jimmy Butler, Chicago Bulls
- Coach of the Year: Mike Budenholzer, Atlanta Hawks
- Executive of the Year: Bob Myers, Golden State Warriors
- Sportsmanship Award: Kyle Korver, Atlanta Hawks
- J. Walter Kennedy Citizenship Award: Joakim Noah, Chicago Bulls
- Twyman–Stokes Teammate of the Year Award: Tim Duncan, San Antonio Spurs

- All-NBA First Team:
  - F Anthony Davis, New Orleans Pelicans
  - F LeBron James, Cleveland Cavaliers
  - C Marc Gasol, Memphis Grizzlies
  - G James Harden, Houston Rockets
  - G Stephen Curry, Golden State Warriors
- All-NBA Second Team:
  - F LaMarcus Aldridge, Portland Trail Blazers
  - F Pau Gasol, Chicago Bulls
  - C DeMarcus Cousins, Sacramento Kings
  - G Russell Westbrook, Oklahoma City Thunder
  - G Chris Paul, Los Angeles Clippers
- All-NBA Third Team:
  - F Blake Griffin, Los Angeles Clippers
  - F Tim Duncan, San Antonio Spurs
  - C DeAndre Jordan, Los Angeles Clippers
  - G Klay Thompson, Golden State Warriors
  - G Kyrie Irving, Cleveland Cavaliers

- NBA All-Defensive First Team:
  - F Kawhi Leonard, San Antonio Spurs
  - F Draymond Green, Golden State Warriors
  - C DeAndre Jordan, Los Angeles Clippers
  - G Tony Allen, Memphis Grizzlies
  - G Chris Paul, Los Angeles Clippers
- NBA All-Defensive Second Team:
  - F Anthony Davis, New Orleans Pelicans
  - F Tim Duncan, San Antonio Spurs
  - C Andrew Bogut, Golden State Warriors
  - G Jimmy Butler, Chicago Bulls
  - G John Wall, Washington Wizards

- NBA All-Rookie First Team:
  - Nikola Mirotić, Chicago Bulls
  - Andrew Wiggins, Minnesota Timberwolves
  - Nerlens Noel, Philadelphia 76ers
  - Jordan Clarkson, Los Angeles Lakers
  - Elfrid Payton, Orlando Magic
- NBA All-Rookie Second Team:
  - Bojan Bogdanović, Brooklyn Nets
  - Langston Galloway, New York Knicks
  - Jusuf Nurkić, Denver Nuggets
  - Zach LaVine, Minnesota Timberwolves
  - Marcus Smart, Boston Celtics

=== Players of the week ===
The following players were named the Eastern and Western Conference Players of the Week.

Week	Eastern Conference	Western Conference	Ref.
Oct. 28 – Nov. 2	Chris Bosh (Miami Heat) (1/1)	Klay Thompson (Golden State Warriors) (1/3)	
Nov. 3 – Nov. 9	Deron Williams (Brooklyn Nets) (1/1)	Stephen Curry (Golden State Warriors) (1/2)	
Nov. 10 – Nov. 16	LeBron James (Cleveland Cavaliers) (1/3)	Damian Lillard (Portland Trail Blazers) (1/2)	
Nov. 17 – Nov. 23	Louis Williams (Toronto Raptors) (1/1)	DeMarcus Cousins (Sacramento Kings) (1/1)	
Nov. 24 – Nov. 30	LeBron James (Cleveland Cavaliers) (2/3)	Blake Griffin (Los Angeles Clippers) (1/1)	
Dec. 1 – Dec. 7	Kyle Lowry (Toronto Raptors) (1/1)	LaMarcus Aldridge (Portland Trail Blazers) (1/2)	
Dec. 8 – Dec. 14	John Wall (Washington Wizards) (1/1)	James Harden (Houston Rockets) (1/3)	
Dec. 15 – Dec. 21	Al Horford (Atlanta Hawks) (1/2)	LaMarcus Aldridge (Portland Trail Blazers) (2/2)	
Dec. 22 – Dec. 28	Jimmy Butler (Chicago Bulls) (1/1)	James Harden (Houston Rockets) (2/3)	
Dec. 29 – Jan. 4	Jeff Teague (Atlanta Hawks) (1/1)	Kevin Durant (Oklahoma City Thunder) (1/1)	
Jan. 5 – Jan. 11	Kemba Walker (Charlotte Hornets) (1/1)	Klay Thompson (Golden State Warriors) (2/3)	
Jan. 12 – Jan. 18	Al Horford (Atlanta Hawks) (2/2)	Mo Williams (Minnesota Timberwolves) (1/2)	
Jan. 19 – Jan. 25	LeBron James (Cleveland Cavaliers) (3/3)	Klay Thompson (Golden State Warriors) (3/3)	
Jan. 26 – Feb. 1	Kyrie Irving (Cleveland Cavaliers) (1/2)	Zach Randolph (Memphis Grizzlies) (1/1)	
Feb. 2 – Feb. 8	Giannis Antetokounmpo (Milwaukee Bucks) (1/1)	Russell Westbrook (Oklahoma City Thunder) (1/2)	
Feb. 23 – Mar. 1	Isaiah Thomas (Boston Celtics) (1/2)	Damian Lillard (Portland Trail Blazers) (2/2)	
Mar. 2 – Mar. 8	Mo Williams (Charlotte Hornets) (2/2)	Russell Westbrook (Oklahoma City Thunder) (2/2)	
Mar. 9 – Mar. 15	Kyrie Irving (Cleveland Cavaliers) (2/2)	Anthony Davis (New Orleans Pelicans) (1/1)	
Mar. 16 – Mar. 22	Dwyane Wade (Miami Heat) (1/1)	Chris Paul (Los Angeles Clippers) (1/1)	
Mar. 23 – Mar. 29	Brook Lopez (Brooklyn Nets) (1/2)	Stephen Curry (Golden State Warriors) (2/2)	
Mar. 30 – Apr. 5	Brook Lopez (Brooklyn Nets) (2/2)	James Harden (Houston Rockets) (3/3)	
Apr. 6 – Apr. 12	Isaiah Thomas (Boston Celtics) (2/2)	Tim Duncan (San Antonio Spurs) (1/1)	

=== Players of the Month ===
The following players were named the Eastern and Western Conference Players of the Month.

Month	Eastern Conference	Western Conference	Ref.
November	Jimmy Butler (Chicago Bulls) (1/1)	Stephen Curry (Golden State Warriors) (1/1)	
December	Kyle Lowry (Toronto Raptors) (1/1)	James Harden (Houston Rockets) (1/2)	
January	Atlanta Hawks' starting lineup (Note: The Hawks' starting lineup consisted of DeMarre Carroll, Al Horford, Kyle Korver, Paul Millsap, and Jeff Teague.) (1/1)	James Harden (Houston Rockets) (2/2)	
February	LeBron James (Cleveland Cavaliers) (1/2)	Russell Westbrook (Oklahoma City Thunder) (1/3)	
March	LeBron James (Cleveland Cavaliers) (2/2)	Russell Westbrook (Oklahoma City Thunder) (2/3)	
April	DeMar DeRozan (Toronto Raptors) (1/1)	Russell Westbrook (Oklahoma City Thunder) (3/3)	

=== Rookies of the Month ===
The following players were named the Eastern and Western Conference Rookies of the Month.

Month	Eastern Conference	Western Conference	Ref.
November	Jabari Parker (Milwaukee Bucks) (1/1)	Andrew Wiggins (Minnesota Timberwolves) (1/4)	
December	Nikola Mirotić (Chicago Bulls) (1/2)	Andrew Wiggins (Minnesota Timberwolves) (2/4)	
January	Elfrid Payton (Orlando Magic) (1/1)	Andrew Wiggins (Minnesota Timberwolves) (3/4)	
February	Marcus Smart (Boston Celtics) (1/1)	Andrew Wiggins (Minnesota Timberwolves) (4/4)	
March	Nikola Mirotić (Chicago Bulls) (2/2)	Jordan Clarkson (Los Angeles Lakers) (1/1)	
April	Bojan Bogdanović (Brooklyn Nets) (1/1)	Rodney Hood (Utah Jazz) (1/1)	

=== Coaches of the Month ===
The following coaches were named the Eastern and Western Conference Coaches of the month.

Month	Eastern Conference	Western Conference	Ref.
November	Dwane Casey (Toronto Raptors) (1/1)	David Joerger (Memphis Grizzlies) (1/1)	
December	Mike Budenholzer (Atlanta Hawks) (1/2)	Terry Stotts (Portland Trail Blazers) (1/1)	
January	Mike Budenholzer (Atlanta Hawks) (2/2)	Steve Kerr (Golden State Warriors) (1/2)	
February	Frank Vogel (Indiana Pacers) (1/1)	Scott Brooks (Oklahoma City Thunder) (1/1)	
March	David Blatt (Cleveland Cavaliers) (1/1)	Steve Kerr (Golden State Warriors) (2/2)	
April	Brad Stevens (Boston Celtics) (1/1)	Doc Rivers (Los Angeles Clippers) (1/1)	

== Notable occurrences ==
- LeBron James returned to the Cleveland Cavaliers after four years with the Miami Heat. He had controversially announced his departure from Cleveland in a nationally televised special on July 8, 2010.
- The Charlotte Bobcats were renamed the Charlotte Hornets on May 20, 2014. The re-established Hornets retained the 10-year history of the Bobcats, as well as regained the original Charlotte Hornets records from the 1988–89 NBA season through the 2001–02 NBA season. The New Orleans Pelicans retained the history and records that existed under the New Orleans Hornets name from the 2002–03 NBA season through the 2012–13 NBA season including the New Orleans/Oklahoma City Hornets of the 2005–06 NBA season and 2006–07 NBA season.
- Lauren Holtkamp became the third female official in NBA history, joining Violet Palmer and Dee Kantner who both joined in the 1997–98 season.
- The Cleveland Cavaliers won the #1 pick in the NBA draft for the second year in a row, as well as the third time in four years and the sixth time in franchise history. It tied with the Chicago Bulls in 2008 for the lowest percentage possible in the modern-day draft lottery, as well as marking the second time a team got the #1 draft pick two years in a row. Their selection was Andrew Wiggins, the second straight Canadian player to be selected as the #1 pick.
- The Houston Rockets and the Minnesota Timberwolves played at the Mexico City Arena on November 12, while the New York Knicks and the Milwaukee Bucks played at The O2 Arena in London on January 15. During the preseason the Toronto Raptors and the New York Knicks played at the Bell Centre in Montreal on October 24, and the Toronto Raptors and the Sacramento Kings played at the Rogers Arena in Vancouver on October 5.
- The Toronto Raptors and Memphis Grizzlies celebrated their 20th anniversaries as franchises in the NBA, although the latter was originally known as the Vancouver Grizzlies.
- Both top selections Andrew Wiggins and Anthony Bennett were traded to the Minnesota Timberwolves for Kevin Love on August 23, the soonest date allowed, with Wiggins having signed a rookie contract 30 days earlier. The trade of Wiggins also marked the second time since the NBA-ABA merger that a #1 draft pick was traded to another team without playing for his drafting team.
- The San Antonio Spurs made history by hiring Becky Hammon as the first full-time female assistant coach in any of the four major U.S. professional sports leagues. Hammon, a guard for the WNBA's San Antonio Stars, joined the Spurs coaching staff upon her retirement at the conclusion of the 2014 WNBA season.
- In September, Atlanta Hawks co-owner Bruce Levenson sold his share of the Hawks after self-reporting a 2012 e-mail he received that was considered inappropriate and racist. Around that same time, general manager Danny Ferry's remark that player Luol Deng "had a bit of African in him" was leaked, resulting in Ferry taking an indefinite leave of absence and having coach Mike Budenholzer taking on the job until his potential return.
- On September 29, the Phoenix Suns became the first team to have two sets of brothers on the same team, with Goran Dragić's younger brother Zoran signing a two-year deal and both twin brothers Markieff and Marcus Morris getting four-year contract extensions. All four played in a loss to the Los Angeles Clippers on November 15, and on January 2, 2015, they played together at the same time late in the fourth quarter in a 112–96 victory over the Philadelphia 76ers.
- On October 6, the NBA announced a new 9-year TV deal with ESPN and TNT worth $24 billion. Starting in the 2015–16 NBA season, the NBA's value increased from $930 million to $2.6 billion per year, which would also increase each team's salary cap from $63 million to around $89 million. In addition, the NBA also announced that it would host an end-of-season award show on TNT.
- On October 19, the Brooklyn Nets and the Boston Celtics played a preseason game that consisted of four 11-minute quarters, instead of the regular 12-minute quarters; it decreased the overall amount of playing time to around two hours. Boston won the game 95–90.
- The NBA logo assumed a new position on team jerseys, moving from the top left chest to the back atop a player's name. In addition, teams who have won a championship had their uniforms adorned with a gold patch on the back, featuring the number of championships won.
- The NBA owners vote 17–13 to reform the lottery odds to reduce the chances of the worst teams in the league winning the lottery. However, the proposal failed as a 23-vote super-majority was required.
- The NBA debuted a replay center in Secaucus, New Jersey on October 28, 2014.
- The league experimented with on-court advertising. The New York Knicks (Chase), Miami Heat and Golden State Warriors (Samsung Electronics), and Philadelphia 76ers (PartyPoker.com), removed their sponsor and replaced it with the website and/or Twitter handle of the team. The Indiana Pacers and the Toronto Raptors retain marquee sponsorship with the Indiana Economic Development Corporation and with Bank of Montreal. Meanwhile, additional teams join in the experimentation: the Houston Rockets court at the Toyota Center was sponsored by ZTE to promote smartphones; the Orlando Magic court at Amway Center was sponsored by FanDuel; the Brooklyn Nets court at Barclays Center was sponsored by AirFastTickets, a ticketing company based in the United Kingdom; the Charlotte Hornets court at the Time Warner Cable Arena was sponsored by Novant Health; and the Utah Jazz court at the EnergySolutions Arena was sponsored by United Fuel Supply, an oil company based in Salt Lake City and established in 2011. The Los Angeles Clippers court at the Staples Center adopted American Airlines as its sponsor. The Washington Wizards joined in on the experimentation as well, with GEICO (which is based in nearby Chevy Chase, Maryland) as the team's marquee sponsor in the Verizon Center. The Minnesota Timberwolves court at the Target Center added USBank; the Phoenix Suns court at the U.S. Airways Center added Annexus, a retirement company; and the New Orleans Pelicans court at the Smoothie King Center added Ochsner Health System.
- On November 1, 2014, Carmelo Anthony surpassed 20,000 career points, becoming the 40th player in NBA history to do so. He reached the milestone in the 1st quarter of a 96–93 home win against the Charlotte Hornets.
- On November 11, Dirk Nowitzki surpassed Hakeem Olajuwon as the highest-scoring player born outside the United States and the 9th all-time, as the Mavericks came from behind 24 points down to beat Sacramento 106–98 for their 21st straight regular-season win at home against the Kings. Nowitzki hit a jumper from just inside the three-point line early in the fourth quarter to pass Olajuwon, finishing the night at 26,953 career points.
- On November 12, Kobe Bryant surpassed John Havlicek and became the all-time leader for missed field goal attempts in the league. His career-breaking record 13,418th missed shot came at 6:22 in the fourth quarter on a 14-foot fadeaway in a 107–102 loss on the road against the Memphis Grizzlies.
- On November 13, the Dallas Mavericks led the Philadelphia 76ers by 44 points, tying for the 2nd-largest margin at halftime. (Mavericks franchise record was broken by their own team on December 27, 2020, led the Los Angeles Clippers by 50 points, 77–27 an NBA record still stands).
- On December 2, the Phoenix Suns announced that the US Airways Center would be renamed the Talking Stick Resort Arena.
- On December 13, Dwight Howard reached 10,000 career rebounds. At 29 years, 5 days, Howard became the third youngest player in NBA history to reach 10,000 career rebounds. Only Wilt Chamberlain (28 years, 81 days) and Bill Russell (28 years, 285 days) reached the milestone at a younger age.
- On December 14, 2014, Kobe Bryant passed Michael Jordan for third place on the all-time scoring list. He reached the mark at 5:24 in the second quarter against the Minnesota Timberwolves by making two free-throw shots. Bryant finished with 26 points in the Lakers' 100–94 victory over Minnesota.
- On December 18, Rajon Rondo and rookie Dwight Powell were traded to the Dallas Mavericks in exchange for the Boston Celtics receiving Brandan Wright, Jae Crowder, Jameer Nelson, a 2015 first round draft pick, and a future second round draft pick.
- On December 22, the Detroit Pistons waived Josh Smith after signing him to a four-year, $54 million contract in July 2013. He signed with the Houston Rockets two days later, after the Rockets waived undrafted rookie Tarik Black, who signed with the Los Angeles Lakers a few days later. In Smith's debut with the Rockets, he recorded 21 points and 8 rebounds in 32 minutes in a 117–111 overtime victory over the Memphis Grizzlies on December 26. After the waivers were cleared, the Pistons went on a seven-game winning streak after starting out 5–23 with Smith on the roster.
- On Christmas Day, jerseys listed players' first names instead of the traditional last names. The Miami Heat defeated the Cleveland Cavaliers 101–91 on Christmas Day, spoiling LeBron James's return to Miami.
- On December 26, Dirk Nowitzki passed Elvin Hayes to become the 8th best all-time scorer. He scored 14 points in the Mavericks' 102–98 victory over the Los Angeles Lakers. Also that day, Jared Dudley became the first player to shoot perfectly from the field while attempting at least 10 field goals and 3 three-pointers, as he scored 24 points on 10-for-10 shooting, (4 for 4 on three-pointers) in the Milwaukee Bucks' 107–77 win over the Atlanta Hawks.
- On January 2, 2015, an agreement was put in place by the Atlanta Hawks ownership to sell the franchise.
- On January 5, Dirk Nowitzki passed Moses Malone to become the 7th best all-time scorer. He scored 15 points in the Mavericks' 96–88 overtime victory over the Brooklyn Nets.
- The Atlanta Hawks became the sole leaders of the Eastern Conference in January for the first time since the 1993–94 NBA season.
- On January 15, the Los Angeles Clippers acquired Austin Rivers, the son of Clippers head coach Doc Rivers, in a three-way trade with the Boston Celtics and Phoenix Suns. Rivers is the first son to play for his father in NBA history.
- On January 23, Klay Thompson scored an NBA-record 37 points in a quarter, when he was a perfect 13-for-13 from the field and 9-for-9 from three-point range in the third quarter of a 126–101 win over the Sacramento Kings. He broke the previous record of 33 held by George Gervin and Carmelo Anthony. The 9 three-pointers were also a league record for a quarter, surpassing the mark of 8 by Michael Redd and Joe Johnson. The 13 field goals tied David Thompson's record for a quarter.
- On January 31, 2015, the Atlanta Hawks became the first team to go 17–0 in a month after defeating the Philadelphia 76ers.
- For the month of January 2015, the entire Atlanta Hawks starting lineup (Jeff Teague, Kyle Korver, DeMarre Carroll, Paul Millsap, and Al Horford) tied for Eastern Conference Player of the Month honors. This marked the first time five players tied for the award, and the second time that multiple players from the same team tied for the award. All except Carroll would go on to become Eastern Conference All-Stars.
- During the All-Star game, Russell Westbrook would record the second-highest number of points with 41 as the Western Conference defeated the Eastern Conference 163–158. After the game, it was announced that the New York Knicks had bought out Amar'e Stoudemire's contract and he could play wherever he wanted to. He'd end up going to the Dallas Mavericks two days later.
- By the February 19 trade deadline, a record 43 different players ended up being traded. Trading highlights included Kevin Garnett returning to the Minnesota Timberwolves; Tayshaun Prince returning to the Detroit Pistons; the Phoenix Suns trading with five different teams and trading both star point guards---Isaiah Thomas to the Boston Celtics and Goran Dragić to the Miami Heat---while getting Brandon Knight from the Milwaukee Bucks; and the Oklahoma City Thunder getting Enes Kanter and Steve Novak from the Utah Jazz and D. J. Augustin and Kyle Singler from the Detroit Pistons in exchange for Kendrick Perkins, Grant Jerrett, and Reggie Jackson.
- On March 24, Dirk Nowitzki recorded his 10,000th rebound in a 101–94 victory over the San Antonio Spurs. He became the first player to record 25,000 points, 10,000 rebounds, 1,000 blocks, and 1,000 three-pointers, as well as the seventh player reach 10,000 rebounds.
- On March 24, 2015, Jeremy Lin and Jordan Clarkson of the Los Angeles Lakers made up the first starting Asian-American backcourt in NBA history in a 127–117 loss against the Oklahoma City Thunder. Clarkson is Filipino-American on his father's side and Filipino on his mother's; Lin's heritage is Chinese/Taiwanese. Clarkson had a career high 30 points and three blocks, along seven assists and four rebounds. He became the youngest Laker to score 30 points since Andrew Bynum on January 21, 2009. Jeremy Lin contributed with 19 points, 7 assists, and 2 rebounds.
- On April 8, Derrick Rose became the first player to return from a torn meniscus injury in a time-span less than 6 months. He was out for approximately 6 weeks.
- All five teams in the Southwest Division made the 2015 playoffs, marking only the fourth time all teams in a division had made the playoffs, and the first time since the entire Central Division made it in the 2005–06 NBA season. It was the first occurrence of all teams in a division making the playoffs with all teams having a winning record.
- On April 11, in a game between the New York Knicks and the Orlando Magic, the teams scored 15 combined points in the second quarter, setting an NBA record for the fewest points in a quarter.
- The New York Knicks and Los Angeles Lakers suffered their first 60-loss seasons in franchise history. The Knicks finished 17–65, surpassing 23–59 in 1986 and 2006. The Lakers finished 21–61, surpassing their worst record of 27–55 from the previous season. It leaves the Utah Jazz as the only franchise without a 60-loss season (not until 2024-25 NBA season as they suffered their first 60-loss season in a loss to Charlotte Hornets).
- The Miami Heat and the Indiana Pacers both missed the playoffs, marking the first time since 2004–05 that two teams who reached the conference finals the previous post-season, failed to make the playoffs.
- The Golden State Warriors and Atlanta Hawks both achieved their first 60-win seasons in franchise history, finishing 67–15 and 60–22 and first place in their conference. Also, both teams advanced to the conference finals for the first time since 1976 and 1970, respectively.
- Russell Westbrook became the first scoring leader since Tracy McGrady in 2003–04 whose team (in this case, the Oklahoma City Thunder) did not make the playoffs.
- On April 30, the Chicago Bulls eliminated the Milwaukee Bucks 120–66 in Game 6 of the playoffs. The 54-point blowout is the largest margin of victory in a series-clinching game in NBA postseason history.
- The San Antonio Spurs became the first defending champions to be eliminated in the first round since the 2012 Dallas Mavericks, and the second time since 2000.
- The Houston Rockets became the ninth team in NBA history to win a playoff series in which they faced a 3–1 deficit—in the Western Conference Semifinals against the Los Angeles Clippers.
- On May 23, Stephen Curry set a new NBA record for the most 3-point FG made in a single playoffs, with 59, previously held by Reggie Miller with 58 in 2000. Curry would eventually finish the postseason with a total of 98 3-point FG made, 39 more than the previous record.
- Both conference final teams from the East and West, notably the Cleveland Cavaliers and the Golden State Warriors respectively, hold commanding 3–0 series leads, a first in NBA playoff history.
- On May 25, the Golden State Warriors made 20 3-pointers (tied playoff record) and Houston Rockets had 17 to set an NBA record for most 3-pointers combined in a playoff game (37).
- The Atlanta Hawks became the fourth #1 seed to be swept in the playoffs.
- For the first time since the inaugural season of the NBA (1947, formerly called the Basketball Association of America), two rookie head coaches, in this case David Blatt of the Cleveland Cavaliers and Steve Kerr of the Golden State Warriors, meet head-to-head in the finals.
- For the first time in NBA Finals history, Games 1 and 2 went into overtime, with the Cleveland Cavaliers and Golden State Warriors splitting victories.

== See also ==
- List of NBA regular season records
