= 2014–15 Chicago Bulls season =

NBA professional basketball team season

- Head coach: Tom Thibodeau
- President: Michael Reinsdorf
- General manager: Gar Forman
- Owners: Jerry Reinsdorf
- Arena: United Center

Results
- Record: 50–32 (.610)
- Place: Division: 2nd (Central); Conference: 3rd (Eastern)
- Playoff finish: Conference Semifinals (lost to Cavaliers 2–4)
- Stats at Basketball Reference

Local media
- Television: CSN Chicago; WGN; WCIU
- Radio: WMVP

The 2014–15 Chicago Bulls season was the franchise's 49th season in the National Basketball Association (NBA), and fifth under head coach Tom Thibodeau. In the off-season, the Bulls let Carlos Boozer go and signed Pau Gasol. Chicago had its first 50-win season since the 2011–12 season with a record of 50–32. Seeded number three in the playoffs, the Bulls met the Milwaukee Bucks in the first round and defeated them, 4–2. However, Chicago's season ended with a 2–4 loss to the eventual Eastern Conference champion Cleveland Cavaliers in the Conference semifinals.

== Offseason ==
=== Draft picks ===
Round	Pick	Player	Position	Nationality	College or club
1	16	Jusuf Nurkić	C	Bosnia and Herzegovina	Cedevita Zagreb (Croatia)
1	19	Gary Harris	SG	United States	Michigan State
2	49	Cameron Bairstow	PF	Australia	New Mexico
Made roster

The team entered the draft with two first-round selections and one second-round selection. They kept their original selections, while the additional first-round pick from the 2010 Tyrus Thomas trade was conveyed from the Charlotte Hornets when the latter made the 2014 NBA playoffs as the Bobcats, having been deferred in 2012 and 2013 due to poor regular-season finishes.

=== Roster changes ===
==== Player signings ====
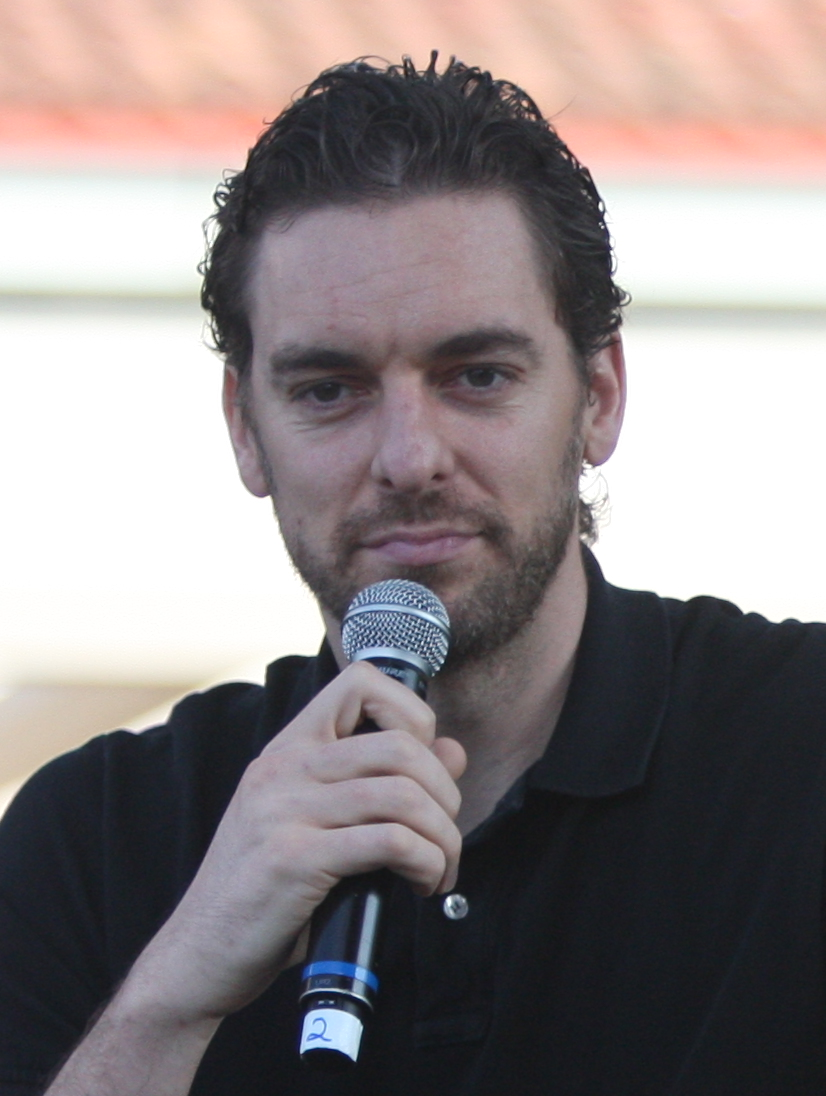
Pau Gasol was signed on July 18.

On July 18, the Bulls signed 13-year veteran Pau Gasol and Real Madrid player Nikola Mirotić. Gasol received a three-year, $22 million deal, while Mirotić's contract was reported to be a three-year, $16.6 million deal. Then, on July 21, Kirk Hinrich was re-signed, whose contract was a two-year, $5.5 million deal. The next day, Aaron Brooks signed with the Bulls.

On September 18, the Bulls signed E'Twaun Moore. Nazr Mohammed was re-signed on September 22. The Bulls finalized their training camp roster with the additions of Kim English, Ben Hansbrough, and Solomon Jones on September 26.

==== Trades ====
On June 26, the Bulls acquired the draft rights to McDermott, the 11th pick in the NBA draft, and Anthony Randolph from the Nuggets, who received the draft rights of Jusuf Nurkić and Gary Harris, as well as a 2015 second-round draft pick. In a trade with the Orlando Magic on July 14, the Bulls gained the draft rights to Milovan Raković, while Randolph, 2015 and 2016 second-round draft picks, and cash considerations were sent to the Magic. On the same day, the Bulls acquired the draft rights to Tadija Dragićević from the Dallas Mavericks, who received Greg Smith.

==== Player departures ====
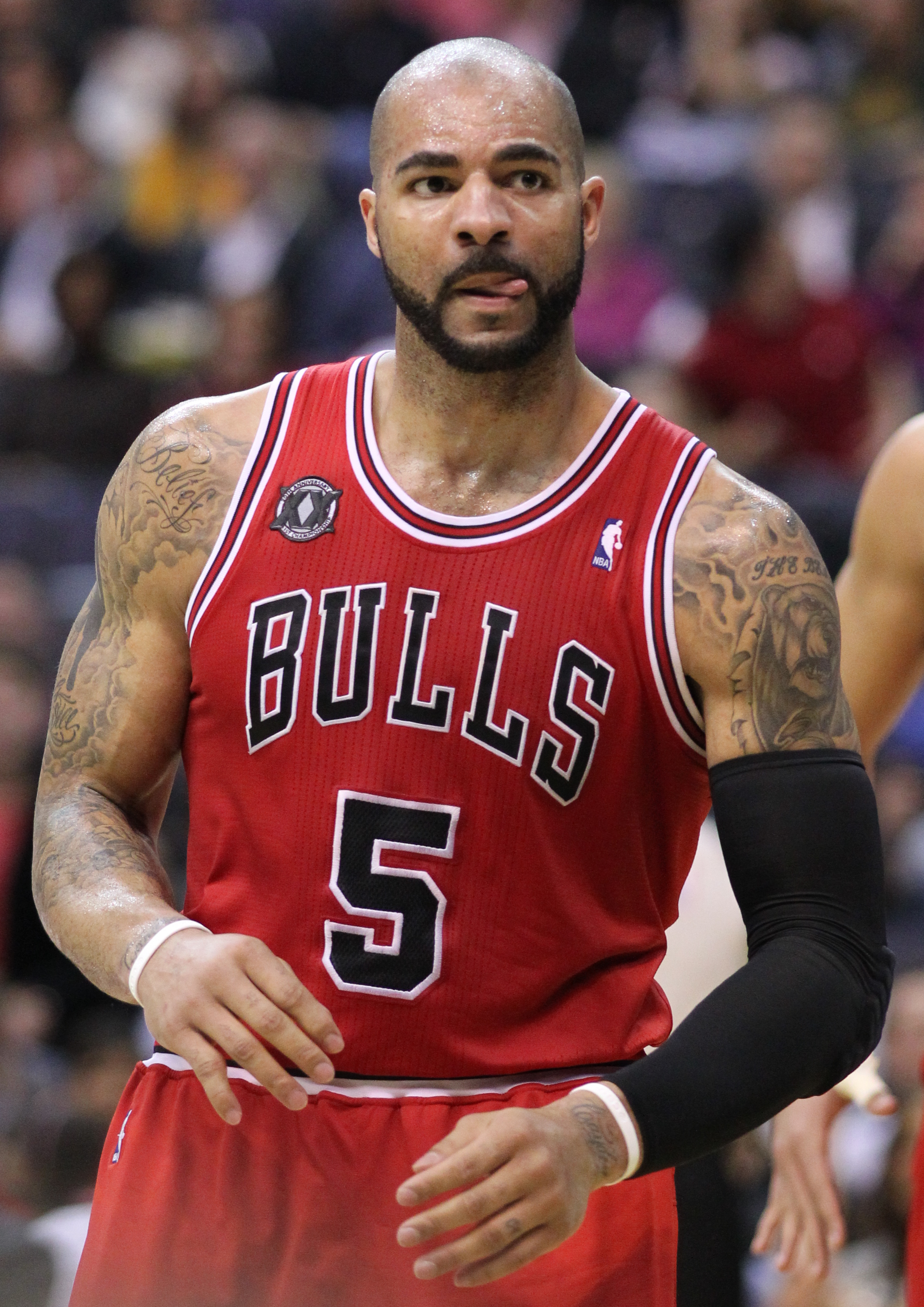
Carlos Boozer was waived on July 17.

On June 21, Tornike Shengelia, an unrestricted free agent, went overseas, signing with Saski Baskonia. D. J. Augustin signed a contract with the Detroit Pistons on July 15. On the same day, the Bulls waived Lou Amundson, Ronnie Brewer, and Mike James. The Bulls then waived 12-year veteran and two-time NBA All-Star Carlos Boozer on July 17. On July 24, Jimmer Fredette signed with the New Orleans Pelicans.

=== Events ===
After having an arthroscopic left knee surgery, Joakim Noah reported that he was "doing well" in rehabilitation on June 27. On August 8, Guy Rodgers, who spent one season with the Bulls, was posthumously inducted into the Naismith Memorial Basketball Hall of Fame. Ronald Dupree, who played for the 2003–04 Chicago Bulls, announced his retirement on September 8. Additionally, Caldwell Jones, who played for the 1984–85 Chicago Bulls, died on September 21.

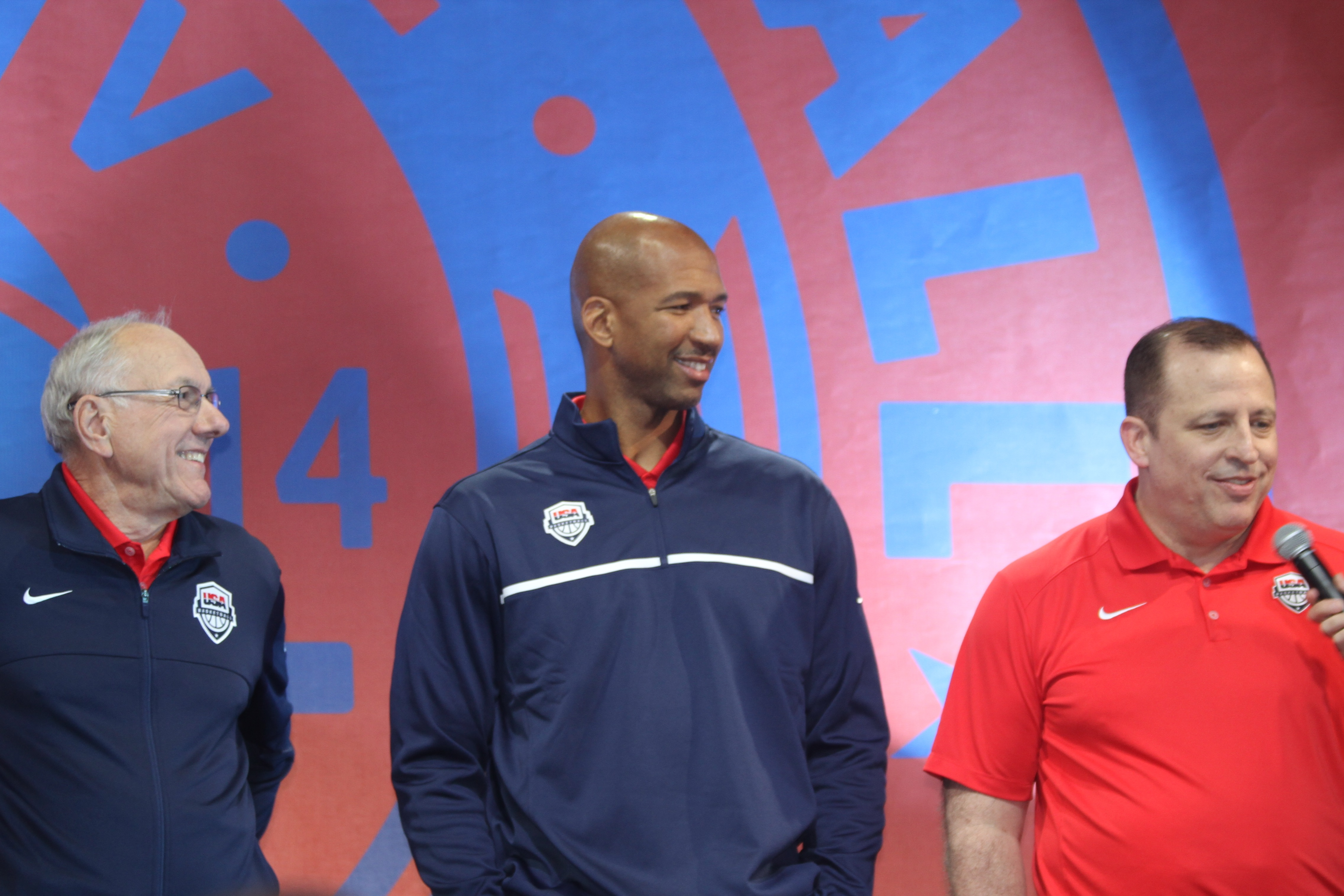
Tom Thibodeau (right) was selected as an assistant coach for the 2014 United States FIBA Basketball World Cup team.

It was announced on July 22 that Jimmy Butler and McDermott would play on the 2014 U.S. Select Team. The Bulls' team captain Derrick Rose participated in the 2014 FIBA Basketball World Cup representing the United States men's national basketball team; head coach Tom Thibodeau was also part of the team as an assistant coach.

Gasol, another Bulls' player, played for the Spain national basketball team in the 2014 FIBA Basketball World Cup. Bairstow also played in the World Cup, competing for the Australia national basketball team. On September 14, Gasol was named to the All-Tournament Team.

On August 11, the Bulls released the 2014–15 preseason schedule for the team. Chicago's 2014–15 regular season schedule was released on August 13. On September 12, the Bulls opened a new training facility called the Advocate Center next to the United Center, replacing the Berto Center in Deerfield, Illinois.

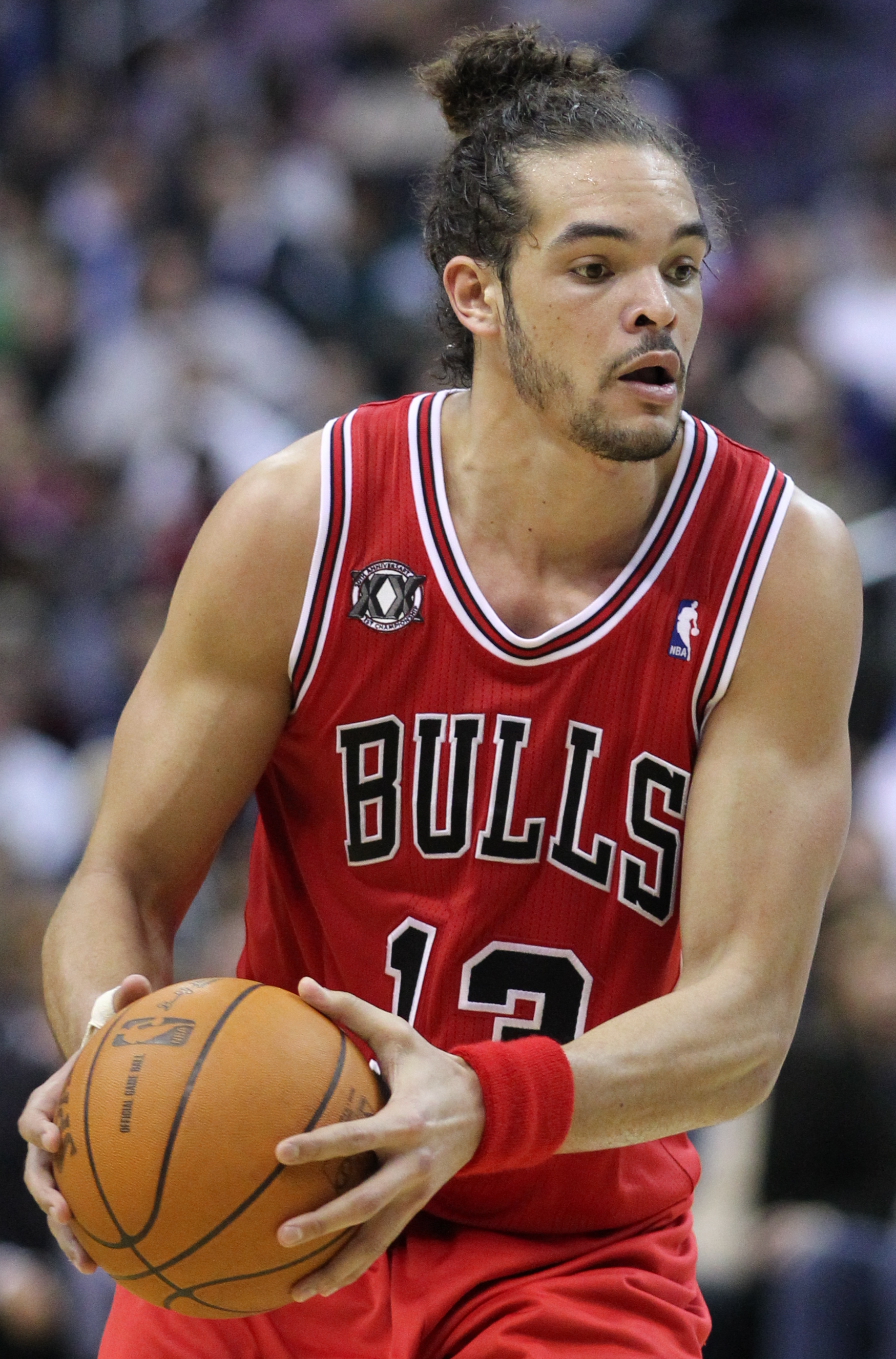
Joakim Noah threw out a couple of ceremonial first pitches at White Sox and Cubs games.

Noah threw out the ceremonial first pitch at a Chicago White Sox game on September 11. The White Sox dubbed their September 13 game vs. the Minnesota Twins as "Bulls Night", welcoming Bulls fans to the ballpark. On September 17, Noah also threw out the first pitch at a Chicago Cubs game.

On September 23, Rose donated $1 million to After School Matters, a non-profit organization based in Chicago. The Bulls began selling tickets to the public on September 26. On September 28, Brooks threw out the ceremonial first pitch before a White Sox game against the Kansas City Royals.

=== Broadcasting ===
On September 11, the 2014–15 television schedule was released. CSN Chicago was selected to broadcast a total of 42 regular-season games and six preseason games. WGN-TV was to televise 22 regular-season games and the remaining two preseason games. Furthermore, WPWR-TV, a station that will replace WCIU-TV for broadcasting rights, will broadcast six regular season games. Throughout the Bulls' regular season, 30 games were selected to be nationally televised. The 30 games were split between ESPN (10), TNT (10), ABC (5), and NBA TV (5). WGN America, WGN-TV's superstation feed, announced it would discontinue its national simulcasts of Bulls games in December 2014 as part of a gradual format change.

Canadian broadcasting schedule (29 games)

Date	Away team	Home team	Time	Broadcaster
November 17, 2014	Chicago Bulls	Los Angeles Clippers	9:30 p.m.	Sportsnet One
November 20, 2014	Chicago Bulls	Sacramento Kings	9:30 p.m.	TSN2
November 21, 2014	Chicago Bulls	Portland Trail Blazers	9:30 p.m.	NBA TV Canada
November 25, 2014	Chicago Bulls	Denver Nuggets	8:00 p.m.	Sportsnet 360
November 30, 2014	Chicago Bulls	Brooklyn Nets	2:00 p.m.	Sportsnet
December 6, 2014	Golden State Warriors	Chicago Bulls	7:00 p.m.	NBA TV Canada
December 18, 2014	New York Knicks	Chicago Bulls	7:00 p.m.	TSN
December 22, 2014	Toronto Raptors	Chicago Bulls	7:00 p.m.	Sportsnet One
December 25, 2014	Los Angeles Lakers	Chicago Bulls	7:00 p.m.	TSN
January 1, 2015	Denver Nuggets	Chicago Bulls	7:00 p.m.	Sportsnet One
January 5, 2015	Houston Rockets	Chicago Bulls	7:00 p.m.	Sportsnet
January 9, 2015	Chicago Bulls	Washington Wizards	7:00 p.m.	TSN2
January 22, 2015	San Antonio Spurs	Chicago Bulls	7:00 p.m.	TSN2
January 23, 2015	Chicago Bulls	Dallas Mavericks	7:00 p.m.	NBA TV Canada
January 25, 2015	Miami Heat	Chicago Bulls	12:00 p.m.	TSN
January 27, 2015	Chicago Bulls	Golden State Warriors	9:30 p.m.	Sportsnet 360
January 29, 2015	Chicago Bulls	Los Angeles Lakers	9:30 p.m.	TSN2
January 30, 2015	Chicago Bulls	Phoenix Suns	9:30 p.m.	NBA TV Canada
February 7, 2015	Chicago Bulls	New Orleans Pelicans	6:00 p.m.	NBA TV Canada
February 12, 2015	Cleveland Cavaliers	Chicago Bulls	7:00 p.m.	TSN2
March 1, 2015	Los Angeles Clippers	Chicago Bulls	12:00 p.m.	TSN2
March 5, 2015	Oklahoma City Thunder	Chicago Bulls	7:00 p.m.	TSN2
March 9, 2015	Memphis Grizzlies	Chicago Bulls	7:00 p.m.	NBA TV Canada
March 20, 2015	Toronto Raptors	Chicago Bulls	7:00 p.m.	Sportsnet
March 25, 2015	Chicago Bulls	Toronto Raptors	6:30 p.m.	TSN
April 5, 2015	Chicago Bulls	Cleveland Cavaliers	2:30 p.m.	TSN2
April 9, 2015	Chicago Bulls	Miami Heat	7:00 p.m.	TSN2

Source: NBA.com (courtesy of the Wayback Machine)

=== Training camp ===
On September 15, the Bulls released their training camp schedule. There were ten practice sessions from September 30 to October 5. Training camp began for the Bulls on September 29 with Media Day at their new Advocate Center. In a scrimmage on September 30, Rose, Butler, Mike Dunleavy Jr., Gasol, and Noah were selected as starters. On October 1, Thibodeau said to reporters that he believed that Mirotić was impressive, and Noah called him a "secret weapon".

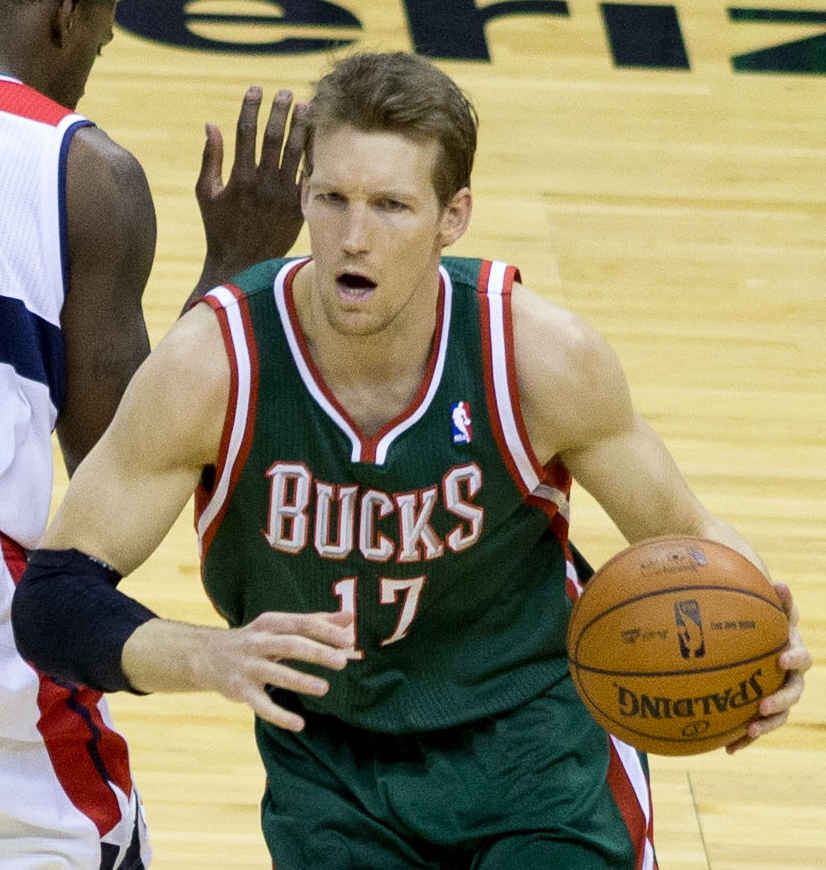
Mike Dunleavy Jr. (pictured) helped in the development of rookie Doug McDermott at training camp.

After receiving a day off, training camp resumed on October 4, Rose's birthday, when he was cited for having his best practice of the season. Meanwhile, Dunleavy helped rookie McDermott fix issues of staying inbounds for corner 3-pointers. Commenting on the team's two rookies, Thibodeau said, "[McDermott] and [Mirotic] have done a good job." Furthermore, Noah said that he would wear a knee brace on his left knee which was surgically repaired during the offseason. On October 5, Rose commented that the Bulls are "a dangerous team". In an ESPN power ranking, Chicago was rated number three behind the Cleveland Cavaliers (number two) and the San Antonio Spurs (number one).

=== Analysis ===
Following the NBA draft, Bleacher Report gave the Bulls a "B". Additionally, USA Today would give a slightly better grade with a "B+". In regard to the McDermott acquisition, James Tillman of HoopsHabit.com assessed a "B" grade to the team. Yahoo! Sports graded the Bulls performance at the draft a "C+". Sporting News assessed a "C" to Chicago. SB Nation graded the first-round draft picks with three categories: upside, fit, and immediate impact. The Bulls' McDermott was assessed a "C" in upside, "A" in fit, and "A" in immediate impact".

CSN Houston assessed an "A+", calling the McDermott pick a steal. The Cincinnati Enquirer gave two "B+" grades each for the Bulls' drafting of McDermott and Bairstow. The Plain Dealer gave Chicago a "B+". Philly.com gave a "B+" for the Bulls. CSN New England gave a "B" grade.

In a July 13 report card, Bleacher Report assessed an "A" to Chicago's trade for McDermott, the drafting of Bairstow a "B−", and the signing of Gasol a "A−". Then, in a HoopsHabit.com August 8 report card, the signing of Gasol was downgraded to a "B+", the McDermott acquisition a "B", the signing of Mirotić a "C+", and the Aaron Brooks signing a "C". On August 12, Deseret News gave out an overall grade of "A".

Bleacher Report would give position-by-position grades on the Bulls' training camp roster. At the point guard position, an "A" grade was given. For the shooting guards, they were rated an above average grade of "B". However, the small forwards were given a "C+". The power forwards were given an "A" mostly due to the addition of Gasol. Lastly, the center position was given a "B+".

In an NBA.com off-season report card, the Bulls were given an "A−" grade.

== Roster ==
2014–15 Chicago Bulls roster
Players

Pos.	No.	Player	Height	Weight	DOB	From
F	41	Cameron Bairstow	6 ft 9 in (2.06 m)	250 lb (113 kg)	1990-12-07	New Mexico
G	0	Aaron Brooks	6 ft 0 in (1.83 m)	161 lb (73 kg)	1985-01-14	Oregon
G/F	21	Jimmy Butler	6 ft 7 in (2.01 m)	220 lb (100 kg)	1989-09-14	Marquette
F	34	Mike Dunleavy Jr.	6 ft 9 in (2.06 m)	230 lb (104 kg)	1980-09-15	Duke
F/C	16	Pau Gasol	7 ft 0 in (2.13 m)	250 lb (113 kg)	1980-07-06	Spain
F	22	Taj Gibson	6 ft 9 in (2.06 m)	225 lb (102 kg)	1985-06-24	USC
G	12	Kirk Hinrich	6 ft 4 in (1.93 m)	190 lb (86 kg)	1981-01-02	Kansas
F	3	Doug McDermott	6 ft 8 in (2.03 m)	225 lb (102 kg)	1992-01-03	Creighton
F	44	Nikola Mirotić	6 ft 10 in (2.08 m)	220 lb (100 kg)	1991-02-11	Spain
C	48	Nazr Mohammed	6 ft 10 in (2.08 m)	250 lb (113 kg)	1977-09-05	Kentucky
G	55	E'Twaun Moore	6 ft 4 in (1.93 m)	191 lb (87 kg)	1989-02-25	Purdue
C	13	Joakim Noah	6 ft 11 in (2.11 m)	232 lb (105 kg)	1985-02-25	Florida
G	1	Derrick Rose	6 ft 3 in (1.91 m)	190 lb (86 kg)	1988-10-04	Memphis
G/F	20	Tony Snell	6 ft 7 in (2.01 m)	200 lb (91 kg)	1991-11-10	New Mexico

Coaches
Head coach
- Tom Thibodeau
Assistant(s)
- Andy Greer
- Adrian Griffin
- Ed Pinckney
- Mike Wilhelm
- Fred Tedeschi (trainer)

Legend
- (DP) Unsigned draft pick
- (FA) Free agent
- (S) Suspended
- (DL) On assignment to D-League affiliate
- Injured

Roster
Updated: October 18, 2014

== Standings ==
=== Central Division ===
Central Division	W	L	PCT	GB	Home	Road	Div	GP
y-Cleveland Cavaliers	53	29	.646	–	31‍–‍10	22‍–‍19	11–5	82
x-Chicago Bulls	50	32	.610	3.0	27‍–‍14	23‍–‍18	8–8	82
x-Milwaukee Bucks	41	41	.500	12.0	23‍–‍18	18‍–‍23	7–9	82
Indiana Pacers	38	44	.463	15.0	23‍–‍18	15‍–‍26	8–8	82
Detroit Pistons	32	50	.390	21.0	18‍–‍23	14‍–‍27	6–10	82

=== Eastern Conference ===
Eastern Conference
#	Team	W	L	PCT	GB	GP
1	c-Atlanta Hawks *	60	22	.732	–	82
2	y-Cleveland Cavaliers *	53	29	.646	7.0	82
3	x-Chicago Bulls	50	32	.610	10.0	82
4	y-Toronto Raptors *	49	33	.598	11.0	82
5	x-Washington Wizards	46	36	.561	14.0	82
6	x-Milwaukee Bucks	41	41	.500	19.0	82
7	x-Boston Celtics	40	42	.488	20.0	82
8	x-Brooklyn Nets	38	44	.463	22.0	82
9	Indiana Pacers	38	44	.463	22.0	82
10	Miami Heat	37	45	.451	23.0	82
11	Charlotte Hornets	33	49	.402	27.0	82
12	Detroit Pistons	32	50	.390	28.0	82
13	Orlando Magic	25	57	.305	35.0	82
14	Philadelphia 76ers	18	64	.220	42.0	82
15	New York Knicks	17	65	.207	43.0	82

=== Record vs. opponents ===
Record vs. opponents

Eastern Conference
Opponent		H	A	T	PER	PS	PA
Atlantic Division
BOS	Boston Celtics	1–1	2–0	3–1	.750	109.5	103.8
BKN	Brooklyn Nets	1–1	2–0	3–1	.750	100.5	86.5
NYK	New York Knicks	2–0	1–0	3–0	1.000	106.0	85.7
PHI	Philadelphia 76ers	1–0	2–0	3–0	1.000	112.0	105.7
TOR	Toronto Raptors	2–0	2–0	4–0	1.000	113.3	102.0
Total		7–2	9–0	16–2	.889	108.2	96.8
Central Division
CHI	Chicago Bulls	—					
CLE	Cleveland Cavaliers	1–1	0–2	1–3	.250	102.3	104.8
DET	Detroit Pistons	2–0	0–2	2–2	.500	93.0	95.0
IND	Indiana Pacers	1–1	1–1	2–2	.500	92.3	93.2
MIL	Milwaukee Bucks	2–0	1–1	3–1	.750	92.0	84.8
Total		6–2	2–6	8–8	.500	94.9	94.4
Southeast Division
ATL	Atlanta Hawks	1–1	0–1	1–2	.333	92.0	95.0
CHA	Charlotte Hornets	1–1	1–1	2–2	.500	94.3	95.0
MIA	Miami Heat	0–1	2–0	2–1	.667	88.7	83.0
ORL	Orlando Magic	1–1	1–1	2–2	.500	103.3	103.3
WAS	Washington Wizards	1–1	1–1	2–2	.500	95.3	97.5
Total		4–5	5–4	9–9	.500	95.2	95.4
Conference total		17–9	16–10	33–19	.635	99.6	95.6

Western Conference
Opponent		H	A	T	PER	PS	PA
Northwest Division
DEN	Denver Nuggets	1–0	0–1	1–1	.500	107.5	107.5
MIN	Minnesota Timberwolves	1–0	1–0	2–0	1.000	101.0	97.0
OKC	Oklahoma City Thunder	1–0	0–1	1–1	.500	104.0	107.0
POR	Portland Trail Blazers	1–0	0–1	1–1	.500	101.0	100.5
UTA	Utah Jazz	0–1	1–0	1–1	.500	87.0	96.0
Total		4–1	2–3	6–4	.600	100.1	101.6
Pacific Division
GSW	Golden State Warriors	1–0	0–1	1–1	.500	107.5	111.5
LAC	Los Angeles Clippers	0–0	0–0	0–0	–	0.0	0.0
LAL	Los Angeles Lakers	0–0	0–0	0–0	–	0.0	0.0
PHX	Phoenix Suns	0–0	0–0	0–0	–	0.0	0.0
SAC	Sacramento Kings	0–0	0–0	0–0	–	0.0	0.0
Total		0–0	0–0	0–0	–	0.0	0.0
Southwest Division
DAL	Dallas Mavericks	0–0	0–0	0–0	–	0.0	0.0
HOU	Houston Rockets	0–0	0–0	0–0	–	0.0	0.0
MEM	Memphis Grizzlies	0–0	0–0	0–0	–	0.0	0.0
NOP	New Orleans Pelicans	0–0	0–0	0–0	–	0.0	0.0
SAS	San Antonio Spurs	0–0	0–0	0–0	–	0.0	0.0
Total		0–0	0–0	0–0	–	0.0	0.0
Conference total		0–0	0–0	0–0	–	0.0	0.0

==== Detailed records ====
Detailed records

Net.	H	A	T	PER	PS	PA
ABC	0–0	0–0	0–0	–	0.0	0.0
ESPN	0–1	1–0	1–1	.500	106.0	97.0
NBA TV	0–0	1–0	1–0	1.000	106.0	105.0
TNT	0–0	0–0	0–0	–	0.0	0.0
CSN Chicago	1–1	1–0	2–1	.667	95.0	96.0
WGN-TV	0–0	2–0	2–0	1.000	105.0	92.5
WPWR-TV	0–0	0–0	0–0	–	0.0	0.0
Total	27–14	23–18	50–32	.610	0.0	0.0

Record when...
A.H	B.H	T.H	A.3rd	B.3rd	T.3rd	In OT	Total
3–0	1–1	0–0	3–0	0–1	1–0	0–1	4–1

Month	H	A	T	PER	PS	PA
October	0–1	1–0	1–1	.500	106.0	97.0
November	2–2	8–3	10–5	.667	0.0	0.0
December	6–3	5–1	11–4	.733	0.0	0.0
January	5–5	3–4	8–9	.471	0.0	0.0
February	5–1	2–2	7–3	.700	0.0	0.0
March	6–2	2–5	8–7	.533	0.0	0.0
April	3–0	2–3	5–3	.625	0.0	0.0
Total	27–14	23–18	50–32	.610	0.0	0.0

Day of week	H	A	T	PER	PS	PA
Sunday	0–0	0–0	0–0	–	0.0	0.0
Monday	0–0	0–0	0–0	–	0.0	0.0
Tuesday	1–0	0–0	1–0	1.000	98.0	90.0
Wednesday	0–0	2–0	2–0	1.000	99.5	83.0
Thursday	0–0	0–0	0–0	–	0.0	0.0
Friday	0–1	0–0	0–1	.000	108.0	114.0
Saturday	0–0	1–0	1–0	1.000	106.0	105.0
Total	27–14	23–18	50–32	.610	0.0	0.0

== Preseason ==
=== Transactions ===
Preseason roster changes

Additions

- On October 27, the Bulls exercised a third-year team option for Tony Snell.

Trades

- None

Departures

- On October 18, the Bulls waived Kim English, Ben Hansbrough, and Solomon Jones.

=== Game log ===
2014 pre-season game log
Total: 4–4 (home: 3–2; road: 1–2)
Preseason: 4–4 (home: 3–2; road: 1–2)

Game	Date	Team	Score	High points	High rebounds	High assists	Location Attendance	Record
1	October 6; 7:00 pm	Washington	L 81–85	Nikola Mirotić (17)	Pau Gasol (8)	Kirk Hinrich (6)	United Center; 21,047	0–1
2	October 7; 6:30 pm	@ Detroit	L 109–111 (OT)	Brooks & Butler (18)	Pau Gasol (10)	Pau Gasol (5)	The Palace of Auburn Hills; 11,081	0–2
3	October 11; 7:30 pm	@ Milwaukee	W 91–85	Pau Gasol (20)	Pau Gasol (11)	Butler & Rose (4)	BMO Harris Bradley Center; 10,769	1–2
4	October 13; 7:00 pm	Denver	W 110–90	Jimmy Butler (21)	Butler & Noah (6)	Derrick Rose (5)	United Center; 21,503	2–2
5	October 16; 7:00 pm	Atlanta	W 85–84	Jimmy Butler (29)	Joakim Noah (13)	Kirk Hinrich (6)	United Center; 21,405	3–2
6	October 19; 7:00 pm	Charlotte	W 101–96	Kirk Hinrich (26)	Gasol & Gibson (10)	Pau Gasol (4)	United Center; 21,739	4–2
7	October 20; 6:00 pm	@ Cleveland	L 98–107	Derrick Rose (30)	Pau Gasol (8)	Joakim Noah (5)	Schottenstein Center; 19,049	4–3
8	October 24; 7:00 pm	Minnesota	L 112–113	Derrick Rose (27)	Joakim Noah (17)	Joakim Noah (9)	Scottrade Center; 10,121	4–4

2014–15 pre-season schedule

=== Game summaries ===
On October 6, Chicago would begin its preseason in the United Center against the Washington Wizards, the very team that eliminated the Bulls in five games in the first round of the 2014 NBA Playoffs. In the midst of a 12-game win streak in preseason games, it ended with an 81–85 loss to the Wizards. At one point in the game, Noah and Wizards' forward Paul Pierce were in a brief scuffle with each other. The confrontation had occurred after Pierce committed a hard foul on Butler, leading Thibodeau to try to break them up. The game was televised locally on CSN Chicago. After the game, Noah and Pierce were fined $15,000 each, and four Wizards players were suspended for one regular season game for leaving the bench.

In the next game, the Bulls met their divisional rival, the Detroit Pistons, at The Palace of Auburn Hills on October 7. Unfortunately, the Bulls would lose in overtime, being defeated 109–111. Thibodeau played it safe and sat Noah out of the game against the Pistons. While the game was televised locally on CSN Chicago, it was also televised nationally on NBA TV.

On October 11, the Bulls' next opponent would be the Milwaukee Bucks at the BMO Harris Bradley Center. Chicago defeated the Bucks 91–85 for their first victory of the preseason. Gasol led the way, accumulating a double-double with 20 points and 11 rebounds. However, Dunleavy would miss the game due to left knee soreness. The game was televised on WGN and NBA TV.

For the Bulls fourth preseason game, they played the Denver Nuggets at home on October 13. In the game, Chicago had trailed by as many as 21 points in the second quarter, but to come back to tie the game at the end of the half. The Bulls would have their way in the second half, outscoring Denver 81–40. With Butler scoring 21 points, the Bulls defeated the Nuggets in a 110–90 blowout victory. Dunleavy returned to play with Chicago after missing the previous game. The game was broadcast on CSN Chicago.

Chicago would start the second half of the preseason playing the Atlanta Hawks on October 16. The Bulls barely managed to defeat the Hawks by a score of 85–84 after Butler drained a three-point buzzer beater at the end of the game. Dunleavy would miss his second preseason game after slipping on a wet spot at a practice session the day before. Instead, McDermott would start for Dunleavy. The game was televised locally on CSN Chicago.

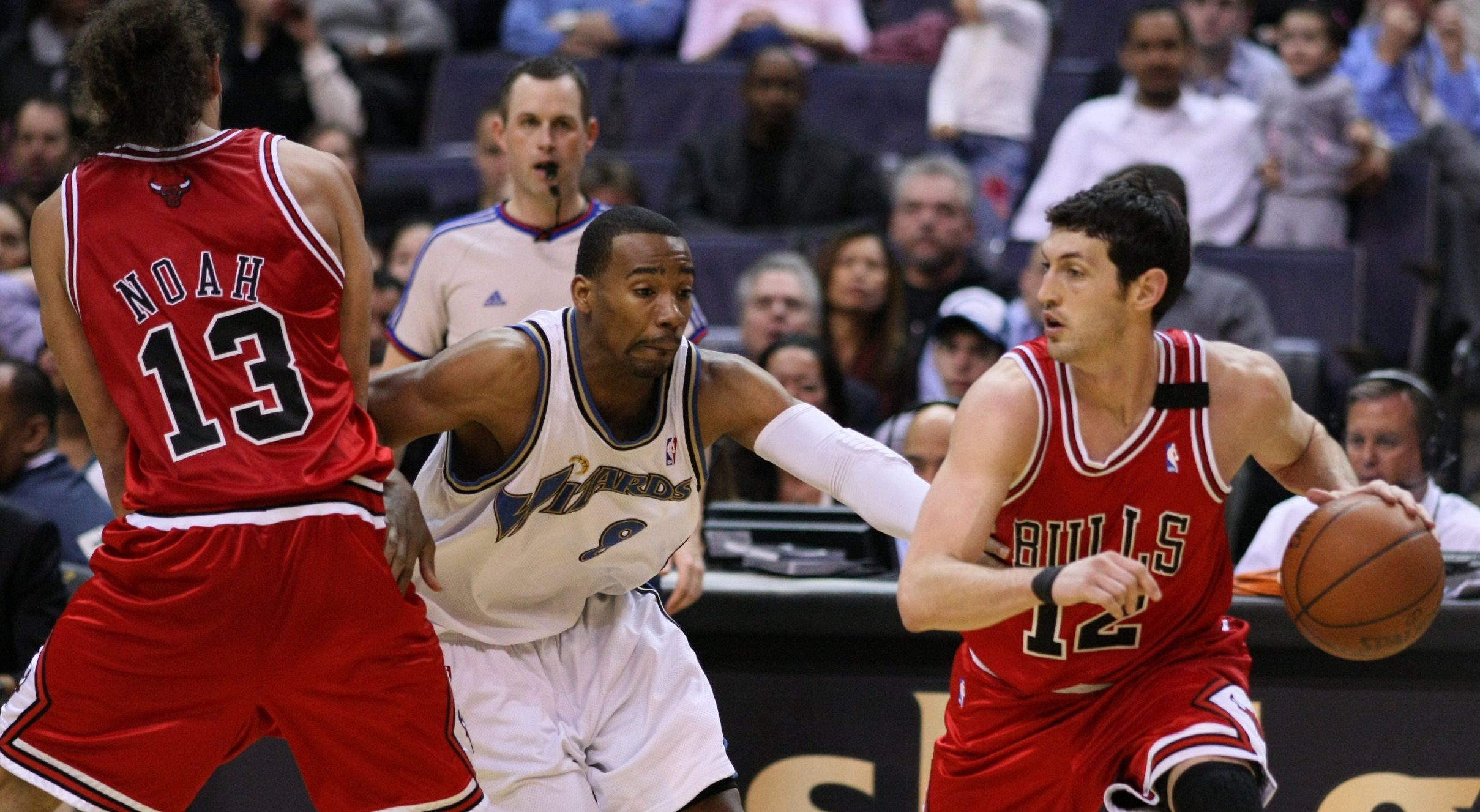
Kirk Hinrich (right) led the Bulls to their fourth consecutive preseason victory.

On October 19, the Bulls played the Charlotte Hornets in what would be Chicago's sixth preseason game. Despite a dangerous Hornets surge in the fourth quarter, the Bulls were successful in defeating Charlotte by a score of 101–96. It was aired locally on WGN and nationally on NBA TV. Following a slipping incident, Dunleavy would return to action once more. However, Butler would sprain his left thumb in the game.

The next day, Chicago met up with divisional opponent, the Cleveland Cavaliers, who saw the return of LeBron James, and would play at the Schottenstein Center in Columbus, Ohio. Butler would sit out due to the injury that he sustained the day before. Even though Rose scored 30 points, the Bulls were not able to defeat the Cavaliers, losing 98–107. The game was broadcast locally on CSN Chicago and nationally on NBA TV.

In its last preseason game, Chicago played the Minnesota Timberwolves on October 24 at the Scottrade Center in St. Louis, Missouri. The Bulls would lose by a score of 112–113 after the Timberwolves came back from being down by 13 points. Butler would miss his second game while recovering from his injury. The game was televised locally on CSN Chicago.

=== Events ===
On October 8, Thibodeau gathered the players for a two-hour practice session on a day that was originally scheduled to be an off-day. On the same day, Noah purchased a new home in Lincoln Park. Thibodeau allowed Rose to rest during an October 9 practice session, because he had lower body soreness. The next day on October 10, Rose would return to practice. Thibodeau said, "[Rose was] doing well."

== Regular season ==
=== Transactions ===
Regular season roster changes

Additions

- None

Trades

- None

Departures

- None

=== Buildup ===
Performance in the previous five seasons
Season	Record	Postseason	Seeding
2009–10	41–41	First round	8th
2010–11	62–20	Conference finals	1st
2011–12	50–16	First round	1st
2012–13	45–37	Conference semifinals	5th
2013–14	48–34	First round	4th

The Cleveland Cavaliers, being named as a serious championship contender, was said to be challenged by the Bulls. The reason was due to the Bulls' depth, defense, the addition of Gasol, and a healthy Rose. On October 1, Bleacher Report released an article stating that Rose and Butler were ranked number five as one of the best backcourts for the 2014–15 season.

In a pre-training camp article from Bleacher Report, the Bulls were predicted to go 58–24 for the regular season. Also before training camp, head coach Thibodeau was ranked number two in a Bleacher Report power ranking, being only behind Spurs head coach Gregg Popovich. In a USA Today article on October 2, the Bulls were projected to go 57–25, which is one win less than the Bleacher Report prediction, and would place the Bulls as number six in their "NBA Watchability Rankings" list. On the next day, a Bleacher Report article gave an 11/2 chance for the Bulls to win the NBA championship.

On September 30, ESPN sportswriter Brian Windhorst cited several long-term problems with the Chicago Bulls with age and injury being a big issue. However, he did say that the addition of Gasol and McDermott "[is] the perfect antidote for the Bulls' offensive woes [the previous] season." Cody Westerlund, a sports editor for CBS Chicago.com, said that McDermott's playing time will be determined by his defense.

The 13th annual general managers' survey was released on October 22. In the survey, the Bulls garnered 11.5% of the vote as being favored to win the NBA championship. Meanwhile, Noah received 35.7% of the votes as the regular season's predicted Defensive Player of the Year. McDermott was regarded by 14.3% of general managers as the biggest steal of the draft. Thibodeau was voted by 92.9% of general managers as the coach with "the best defensive schemes".

=== October–November ===
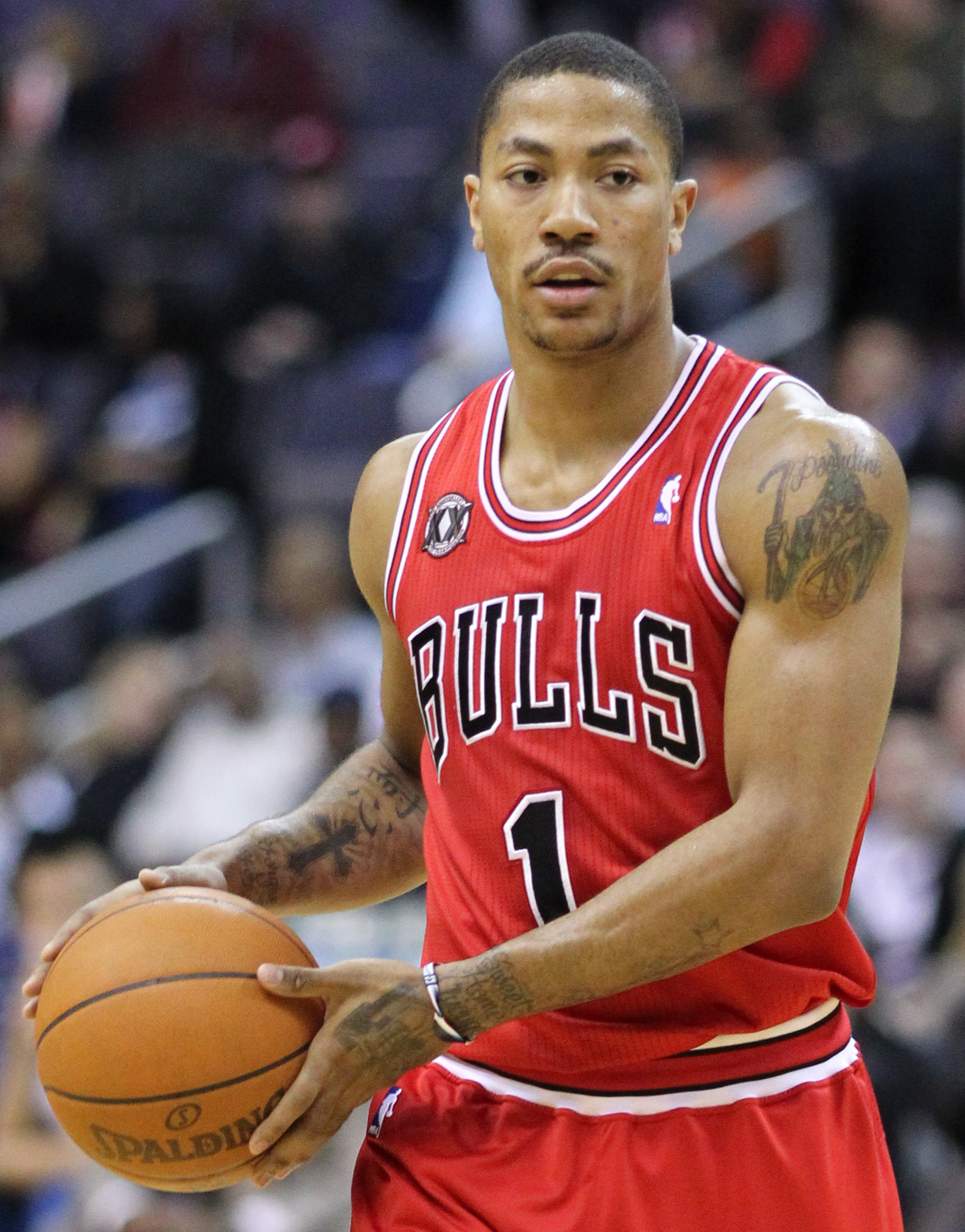
Derrick Rose sprained his left ankle on Halloween, and missed several games. This was after having a torn ACL in his left knee in the 2011–12 season and a torn meniscus in his right knee the previous season.

In their season opener on October 29, the Bulls defeated the rival New York Knicks at Madison Square Garden. Winning in a 104–80 blowout, Taj Gibson was the leading scorer with 22 points. In Week 1 of Scott Howard-Cooper's "Rookie Ladder", Mirotić and McDermott were ranked numbers six and eight respectively. On October 31, before their Halloween game, the Bulls were unable to deal a new contract with Butler before the deadline, which would make him a restricted free agent during the 2015 off-season. That night, Chicago's home opener would enter overtime, where the Bulls lost 108–114. During the game, Gibson faced an injury scare, while Rose left the court in the fourth quarter due to a sprained left ankle. Entering November having split the first pair of games, Chicago played the Minnesota Timberwolves at Target Center. After missing two weeks, Butler was expected to miss another two-to-four weeks, but he returned to play against the Timberwolves. In the last second of the game, the Bulls were down by one when Butler was fouled by Andrew Wiggins and made both free throws to take the lead and win by a score of 106–105. At the end of the first week of the season, ESPN dropped the Bulls from number three to number five in the power rankings due to Rose's injury.

On November 4, the Bulls took on the Orlando Magic. Even though Noah missed the game with an illness, Chicago won 98–90 with Butler scoring 21 points. In their fifth game of the regular season, the Bulls defeated the Milwaukee Bucks at the BMO Harris Bradley Center by a score of 95–86. While Noah missed his second game, Rose returned from his ankle injury. Rose's ankle injury would result in the cover of the November 5 edition of the Chicago Sun-Times calling him "Damaged goods". In the Week 2 version of the Rookie Ladder, Mirotić rose to the fifth rank while McDermott stayed at number eight. On November 7, with Rose on the inactive list, Dunleavy would lead the way for the Bulls to defeat the Philadelphia 76ers by a score of 118–115 at the Wells Fargo Center. The next day, Chicago was defeated for the second time in the season, against the Boston Celtics, 101–106. In the ESPN power rankings, the Bulls fell to the number six rank.

After facing difficulties with his ankles, Rose returned to action on November 10 and helped the Bulls defeat the Detroit Pistons by a score of 102–91. In the Week 3 edition of the Rookie Ladder, McDermott fell to the number nine rank and Mirotić fell out altogether. On November 13, Chicago defeated the Toronto Raptors in the Air Canada Centre at the expense of Rose. He would leave in the fourth quarter because of an injured left hamstring. In a postgame conference, Noah would defend Rose by saying "everybody needs to chill...out." Gasol would also defend him, saying "Everyone has [Rose's] back." On November 14, it was reported by CBS Sports that Rose suffered a mild strain and that an MRI was unnecessary, calling it a day-to-day injury. The Bulls–Pacers rivalry would continue in Chicago's final home game of the month on November 15, as it was defeated by the injury-stricken Indiana Pacers, even though Butler scored a career-high 32 points. Chicago would continue to fall in the power rankings, being ranked number seven.

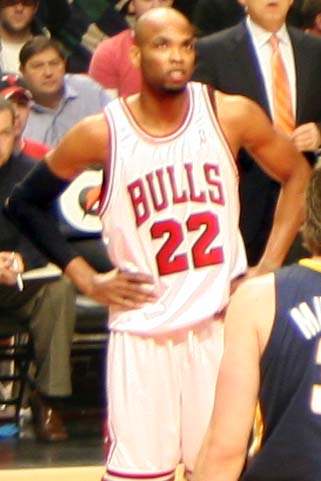
Sixth man Taj Gibson would suffer his first injury of the 2014–15 season with a sprained ankle on November 21, 2014, against the Portland Trail Blazers.

Chicago's circus trip began on November 17. As put by the Los Angeles Times, the Los Angeles Clippers were "Bull-dozed" when Chicago won by a score of 105–89. Gasol would not play due to a strained calf and Rose would continue to miss games because of his strained hamstring. On Week 4 of the Rookie Ladder, McDermott rose to the number seven rank. In the first game of a back-to-back, the Bulls would be dealt their first loss on the road by the upstart Sacramento Kings on November 20. The next day, Business Insider called Rose's contract with the Bulls "a nightmare" for the organization, mentioning that he had only played in five of the first 12 games of the season and that he's being paid the most money on the team. On the second night of a back-to-back, the Bulls lost to the Portland Trail Blazers. During the game, Dunleavy was called for a Flagrant I when Damian Lillard was attempting to shoot a three-pointer, which resulted in a skirmish and technical fouls being called on Blazer Wesley Matthews and Brooks. Furthermore, Gibson suffered a sprained ankle in the third quarter and did not come back to the court; Hinrich was out with a chest contusion. Due to Chicago's continuing struggles, the Bulls declined to the number nine rank of the power rankings.

On November 24, the Bulls defeated the Utah Jazz. In a report by CBS Sports, it was said that the Bulls were one of seven teams interested in shooting guard Ray Allen, who averaged 9.6 points per game with the Miami Heat in the 2013–14 season. After a returning Gasol made one-of-two free throws with 3.2 seconds left in the game, Gordon Hayward would miss a three pointer at the end of the game, giving the Bulls a 97–95 win. Rose would also return for the Bulls, scoring 18 points in the game. The next day, Chicago lost to the Denver Nuggets by a score of 109–114. In the game, Hinrich would return from his chest injury to play. Furthermore, Noah would join Gibson on the injured list as he sat out with a sore left knee and an eye abrasion. In the first half, Rose would leave the game as issues with his left hamstring resurfaced. On November 26, Mirotić would return to the Rookie Ladder on Week 5 being ranked number ten while McDermott dropped out. At TD Garden, the Bulls defeated the Boston Celtics behind Butler's 22 points, winning by a score of 109–102. Besides Gibson who was still injured, Noah would return to play, accumulating 15 points and 14 rebounds. On November 30, the Bulls would end its circus trip with a decisive 102–84 victory against the Brooklyn Nets. Chicago would be led by Butler's 26 points and Gasol's 25 points. The team would have its second winning record in its circus trip (4–3) since the retirement of Michael Jordan. With November closing, the Bulls rose by one rank to number eight in the power rankings. Butler received recognition for his performance in October and November and was named the Eastern Conference Player of the Month.

=== December ===
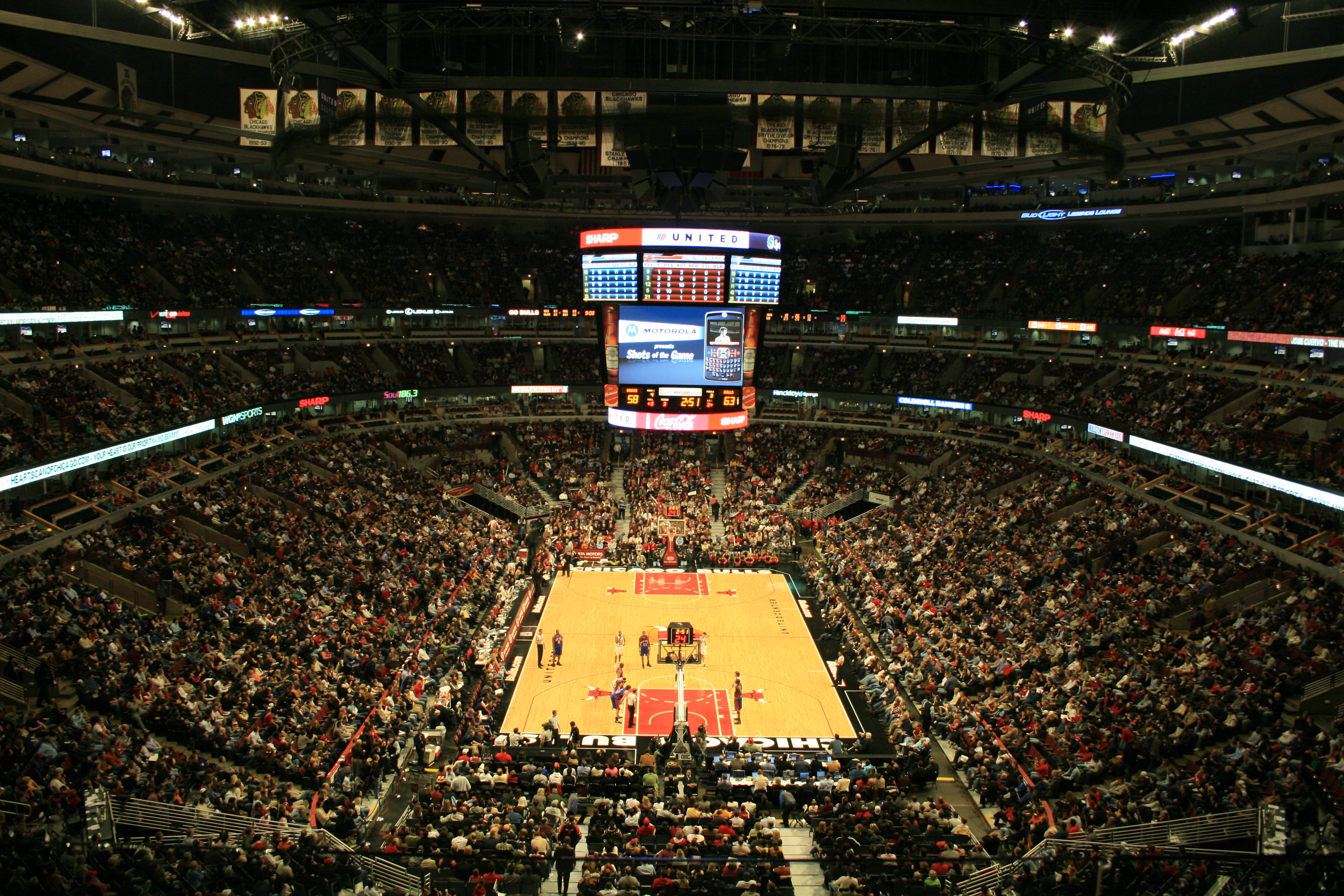
After going 2–3 at home in the months of October and November, the Bulls would turn it around, going 6–3 at the United Center in December.

In its second overtime game of the regular season, Chicago was defeated by the Dallas Mavericks by a score of 129–132. Unable to play, McDermott would be out with a right knee injury. However, the Bulls would make up for the loss by winning their league-high tenth road game against the Charlotte Hornets. Six weeks in, Mirotić would rise to the eighth rank of the Rookie Ladder. On December 6, Chicago was defeated by the strong Golden State Warriors, who won their twelfth-straight game. With the first week of December completed, the Bulls would fall to the tenth rank of the power rankings.

On December 10, the Bulls blew-out the Nets once again by defeating them 105–80. Moving on through the season, Mirotić rose to the number six rank on the Rookie Ladder. Led by Rose's 31 points, Chicago would defeat the Portland Trail Blazers to even and close the season series against each other. In the American Airlines Arena, the Bulls would limit the Miami Heat to 75 points as they defeated them. At the end of the week, the Bulls would be ranked number seven in the power rankings.

Starting off the third week of December in Philips Arena, the Bulls would lose to the Atlanta Hawks. In Week 8, Mirotić would continue to rise, being placed in the number four rank. On December 18, Butler would best his career-high 32 points set the previous month by scoring 35 points in a victory against the New York Knicks. The next day, Chicago would end the Memphis Grizzlies' six-game winning streak with Butler scoring his fourth 30-point game of the season. In the power rankings, Chicago would stay put at number seven.

In the fourth week of December, the Bulls would defeat the then-Eastern Conference leader, the Toronto Raptors, by a score of 129–120 at home. The game featured a 49-point fourth quarter, which was the most points scored by the Bulls in their entire history. On December 23 at the Verizon Center, the Bulls defeated the Washington Wizards 99–91. In Week 9 of the Rookie Ladder, Mirotić improved to the third rank. Playing on Christmas Day, the Bulls would blowout the Los Angeles Lakers, winning by 20 points and winning a season-high five consecutive games. On December 27, led by a 33-point performance by Butler, Chicago defeated the New Orleans Pelicans, 107–100. For his performance between December 22 and 28, Jimmy Butler would be named as the Eastern Conference Player of the Week. Because of their winning streak, the Bulls would rise all the way to number one in the Power Rankings.

Chicago would continue its winning ways by narrowly defeating the Indiana Pacers on December 29. After winning seven-straight games, the Bulls would fall as Brook Lopez scored a season-high 29 points for the Nets. After the month of December came to a close, Mirotić was recognized for his performance and received the Eastern Conference Rookie of the Month of December.

=== January ===
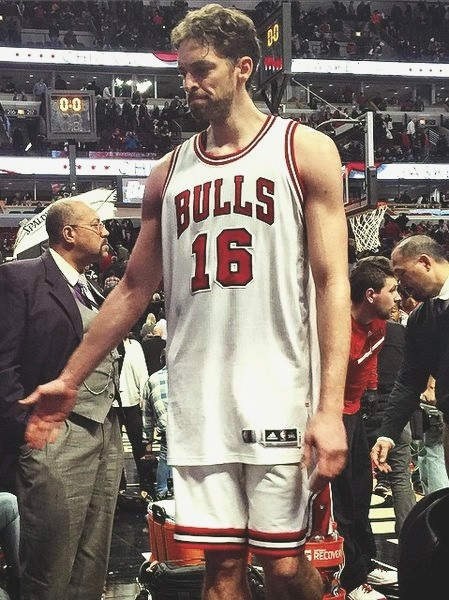
Pau Gasol would score a career-high 46 points against the Milwaukee Bucks on January 10.

Kicking off the year of 2015, the Bulls would set a franchise record by blocking 18 shots against the Nuggets and eventually winning. In the second game of the year, Gasol would lead the Bulls to an overtime victory against the Celtics with 29 points and 16 rebounds. With the first week of 2015 over, Chicago would decline to number three in the power rankings.

After a moment of silence for ESPN sportscaster Stuart Scott, who died on January 4 from cancer, the Bulls would defeat the Houston Rockets. Then on January 7, the Bulls would be defeated by the Jazz after being held to a season-low point total with 28-of-84 (33.3 percent) shooting. Chicago would lose back-to-back games for the first time since November 20–21, 2014, against the Wizards. On January 10, the Bulls would defeat the Bucks after a big outing by Gasol that produced a career-high 46 points for the big man. In the power rankings, Chicago would fall to number five.

Despite a good performance, the Bulls would fall to the Magic 114–121. Even though Rose would score 32 points, Chicago would continue to struggle after losing to the Wizards twice in five days. With Noah out with a sprained ankle, the Bulls would defeat the Celtics on January 16 behind a Rose double double. The next day, the Atlanta Hawks, who were on an eleven-game winning streak at the time, would defeat Chicago in the United Center for the first time since May 2, 2011. Chicago's descent in the power rankings would continue as the team fell to number eleven.

After losing to Atlanta, the Bulls would lose to divisional opponent Cavaliers on January 19. Despite a rough stretch, the Bulls would blow out the defending champion San Antonio Spurs. On January 23, the Bulls would top the other Texan team in Dallas aided by the 40 points that the backcourt duo of Rose and Butler put up. However, the Bulls would lose their next game to the Heat on Sunday. Because Chicago defeated the Spurs, the Bulls rose to number nine in the power rankings.

On January 27, the Bulls would miraculously defeat the Warriors with Rose's game-winning field goal with seven seconds left in overtime.

=== March ===
The Bulls would start March going up against the Clippers. Injury would strike again as Butler would sprain his elbow he would have an MRI revealing that Butler would miss 3–4 weeks. Despite Butlers injury there were positives as Nikola Mirotic would shine and score 29 points.

=== Game log ===
2014–15 game log
Total: 50–32 (home: 27–14; road: 23–18)
October: 1–1 (home: 0–1; road: 1–0)

Game	Date	Team	Score	High points	High rebounds	High assists	Location Attendance	Record
1	October 29; 7:00 pm	@ New York	W 104–80	Taj Gibson (22)	Pau Gasol (11)	Aaron Brooks (6)	Madison Square Garden; 19,812	1–0
2	October 31; 7:00 pm	Cleveland	L 108–114 (OT)	Hinrich & Rose (20)	Joakim Noah (13)	Mike Dunleavy Jr. (8)	United Center; 22,879	1–1

November : 10–5 (home: 2–2; road: 8–3)

Game	Date	Team	Score	High points	High rebounds	High assists	Location Attendance	Record
3	November 1; 7:00 pm	@ Minnesota	W 106–105	Jimmy Butler (24)	Joakim Noah (11)	Aaron Brooks (5)	Target Center; 19,356	2–1
4	November 4; 7:00 pm (Note: Prior to the November 4 game, daylight saving time will have ended on November 2.)	Orlando	W 98–90	Jimmy Butler (21)	Pau Gasol (13)	Aaron Brooks (8)	United Center; 21,809	3–1
5	November 5; 7:00 pm	@ Milwaukee	W 95–86	Taj Gibson (23)	Pau Gasol (14)	Butler & Rose (7)	BMO Harris Bradley Center; 13,098	4–1
6	November 7; 6:00 pm	@ Philadelphia	W 118–115	Mike Dunleavy Jr. (27)	Pau Gasol (12)	Kirk Hinrich (7)	Wells Fargo Center; 16,820	5–1
7	November 8; 7:00 pm	Boston	L 101–106	Aaron Brooks (26)	Joakim Noah (11)	Aaron Brooks (8)	United Center; 22,104	5–2
8	November 10; 7:00 pm	Detroit	W 102–91	Derrick Rose (24)	Pau Gasol (15)	Derrick Rose (7)	United Center; 21,431	6–2
9	November 13; 7:00 pm	@ Toronto	W 100–93	Pau Gasol (27)	Pau Gasol (11)	Butler & Noah (6)	Air Canada Centre; 19,800	7–2
10	November 15; 7:00 pm	Indiana	L 90–99	Jimmy Butler (32)	Four players (6)	Kirk Hinrich (7)	United Center; 22,248	7–3
11	November 17; 9:30 pm	@ L.A. Clippers	W 105–89	Jimmy Butler (22)	Joakim Noah (16)	Jimmy Butler (8)	Staples Center; 19,319	8–3
12	November 20; 9:30 pm	@ Sacramento	L 88–103	Jimmy Butler (23)	Joakim Noah (11)	Kirk Hinrich (7)	Sleep Train Arena; 17,317	8–4
13	November 21; 9:30 pm	@ Portland	L 87–105	Nikola Mirotić (24)	Nikola Mirotić (11)	Brooks & Moore (3)	Moda Center; 19,866	8–5
14	November 24; 8:00 pm	@ Utah	W 97–95	Jimmy Butler (25)	Pau Gasol (9)	Derrick Rose (5)	EnergySolutions Arena; 18,904	9–5
15	November 25; 8:00 pm	@ Denver	L 109–114	Jimmy Butler (32)	Pau Gasol (11)	Kirk Hinrich (8)	Pepsi Center; 17,033	9–6
16	November 28; 12:00 pm	@ Boston	W 109–102	Jimmy Butler (22)	Pau Gasol (15)	Joakim Noah (6)	TD Garden; 18,203	10–6
17	November 30; 2:00 pm	@ Brooklyn	W 102–84	Jimmy Butler (26)	Pau Gasol (13)	Jimmy Butler (5)	Barclays Center; 17,732	11–6

December : 11–4 (home: 6–3; road: 5–1)

Game	Date	Team	Score	High points	High rebounds	High assists	Location Attendance	Record
18	December 2; 7:00 pm	Dallas	L 129–132 (2OT)	Pau Gasol (29)	Gasol & Noah (14)	Derrick Rose (10)	United Center; 22,042	11–7
19	December 3; 6:00 pm	@ Charlotte	W 102–95	Pau Gasol (19)	Pau Gasol (15)	Joakim Noah (7)	Time Warner Cable Arena; 16,887	12–7
20	December 6; 7:00 pm	Golden State	L 102–112	Jimmy Butler (24)	Pau Gasol (20)	Derrick Rose (6)	United Center; 22,353	12–8
21	December 10; 7:00 pm	Brooklyn	W 105–80	Derrick Rose (23)	Pau Gasol (16)	Derrick Rose (4)	United Center; 21,646	13–8
22	December 12; 6:00 pm	Portland	W 115–106	Derrick Rose (31)	Gasol & Gibson (10)	Derrick Rose (5)	United Center; 21,275	14–8
23	December 14; 5:00 pm	@ Miami	W 93–75	Mike Dunleavy Jr. (22)	Gasol & Gibson (9)	Jimmy Butler (5)	American Airlines Arena; 19,600	15–8
24	December 15; 6:30 pm	@ Atlanta	L 86–93	Jimmy Butler (22)	Taj Gibson (17)	Derrick Rose (8)	Philips Arena; 16,805	15–9
25	December 18; 7:00 pm	New York	W 103–97	Jimmy Butler (35)	Joakim Noah (13)	Jimmy Butler (7)	United Center; 21,875	16–9
26	December 19; 7:00 pm	@ Memphis	W 103–97	Jimmy Butler (31)	Joakim Noah (13)	Kirk Hinrich (7)	FedExForum; 18,119	17–9
27	December 22; 7:00 pm	Toronto	W 129–120	Derrick Rose (29)	Jimmy Butler (11)	Butler & Noah (4)	United Center; 21,846	18–9
28	December 23; 6:00 pm	@ Washington	W 99–91	Derrick Rose (25)	Joakim Noah (11)	Aaron Brooks (6)	Verizon Center; 20,356	19–9
29	December 25; 7:00 pm	L.A. Lakers	W 113–93	Pau Gasol (23)	Pau Gasol (13)	Brooks & Rose (6)	United Center; 22,865	20–9
30	December 27; 7:00 pm	New Orleans	W 107–100	Jimmy Butler (33)	Taj Gibson (10)	Pau Gasol (6)	United Center; 21,935	21–9
31	December 29; 6:00 pm	@ Indiana	W 92–90	Jimmy Butler (27)	Mike Dunleavy Jr. (10)	Derrick Rose (6)	Bankers Life Fieldhouse; 18,165	22–9
32	December 30; 7:00 pm	Brooklyn	L 82–96	Mike Dunleavy Jr. (23)	Joakim Noah (8)	Pau Gasol (7)	United Center; 22,032	22–10

January : 8–9 (home: 5–5; road: 3–4)

Game	Date	Team	Score	High points	High rebounds	High assists	Location Attendance	Record
33	January 1; 7:00 pm	Denver	W 106–101	Jimmy Butler (26)	Joakim Noah (11)	Butler & Rose (8)	United Center; 21,794	23–10
34	January 3; 7:00 pm	Boston	W 109–104	Pau Gasol (29)	Pau Gasol (16)	Joakim Noah (6)	United Center; 21,820	24–10
35	January 5; 7:00 pm	Houston	W 114–105	Pau Gasol (27)	Pau Gasol (14)	Derrick Rose (9)	United Center; 21,510	25–10
36	January 7; 7:00 pm	Utah	L 77–97	Jimmy Butler (16)	Jimmy Butler (11)	Butler & Noah (3)	United Center; 21,379	25–11
37	January 9; 7:00 pm	@ Washington	L 86–102	Derrick Rose (19)	Pau Gasol (13)	Aaron Brooks (4)	Verizon Center; 20,356	25–12
38	January 10; 7:00 pm	Milwaukee	W 95–87	Pau Gasol (46)	Pau Gasol (18)	Jimmy Butler (10)	United Center; 21,781	26–12
39	January 12; 7:00 pm	Orlando	L 114–121	Pau Gasol (28)	Pau Gasol (14)	Derrick Rose (7)	United Center; 21,302	26–13
40	January 14; 7:00 pm	Washington	L 99–105	Derrick Rose (32)	Pau Gasol (8)	Derrick Rose (4)	United Center; 21,498	26–14
41	January 16; 6:30 pm	@ Boston	W 119–103	Derrick Rose (29)	Pau Gasol (11)	Derrick Rose (10)	TD Garden; 18,624	27–14
42	January 17; 7:00 pm	Atlanta	L 99–107	Derrick Rose (23)	Pau Gasol (15)	Derrick Rose (10)	United Center; 22,024	27–15
43	January 19; 6:30 pm	@ Cleveland	L 94–108	Jimmy Butler (20)	Pau Gasol (11)	Brooks & Butler (3)	Quicken Loans Arena; 20,562	27–16
44	January 22; 7:00 pm	San Antonio	W 104–81	Derrick Rose (22)	Pau Gasol (17)	Derrick Rose (5)	United Center; 21,648	28–16
45	January 23; 7:00 pm	@ Dallas	W 102–98	Rose & Butler (20)	Pau Gasol (16)	Jimmy Butler (6)	American Airlines Center; 20,408	29–16
46	January 25; 12:00 pm	Miami	L 84–96	Derrick Rose (19)	Pau Gasol (17)	Derrick Rose (4)	United Center; 21,918	29–17
47	January 27; 9:30 pm	@ Golden State	W 113–111 (OT)	Derrick Rose (30)	Pau Gasol (16)	Pau Gasol (8)	Oracle Arena; 19,596	30–17
48	January 29; 9:30 pm	@ L.A. Lakers	L 118–123 (2OT)	Jimmy Butler (35)	Joakim Noah (17)	Joakim Noah (9)	Staples Center; 18,997	30–18
49	January 30; 9:30 pm	@ Phoenix	L 93–99	Derrick Rose (23)	Pau Gasol (19)	Joakim Noah (5)	US Airways Center; 18,055	30–19

February : 7–3 (home: 5–1; road: 2–2)

Game	Date	Team	Score	High points	High rebounds	High assists	Location Attendance	Record
50	February 4; 7:00 pm	@ Houston	L 90–101	Jimmy Butler (27)	Joakim Noah (19)	Kirk Hinrich (4)	Toyota Center; 18,325	30–20
51	February 7; 6:00 pm	@ New Orleans	W 107–72	Rose & Gasol (20)	Pau Gasol (19)	Jimmy Butler (5)	Smoothie King Center; 18,402	31–20
52	February 8; 5:00 pm	@ Orlando	W 98–97	Jimmy Butler (27)	Pau Gasol (15)	Derrick Rose (11)	Amway Center; 16,944	32–20
53	February 10; 7:00 pm	Sacramento	W 104–86	Pau Gasol (26)	Pau Gasol (16)	Derrick Rose (7)	United Center; 21,560	33–20
54	February 12; 7:00 pm	Cleveland	W 113–98	Derrick Rose (30)	Joakim Noah (19)	Rose & Noah (7)	United Center; 21,920	34–20
All-Star Break
55	February 20; 6:30 pm	@ Detroit	L 91–100	Jimmy Butler (30)	Joakim Noah (14)	Derrick Rose (5)	The Palace of Auburn Hills; 19,053	34–21
56	February 21; 7:00 pm	Phoenix	W 112–107	Pau Gasol (22)	Pau Gasol (14)	Joakim Noah (8)	United Center; 22,292	35–21
57	February 23; 7:00 pm	Milwaukee	W 87–71	Tony Snell (20)	Joakim Noah (16)	Derrick Rose (8)	United Center; 21,434	36–21
58	February 25; 7:00 pm	Charlotte	L 86–98	Pau Gasol (25)	Pau Gasol (13)	Joakim Noah (8)	United Center; 21,509	36–22
59	February 27; 7:00 pm	Minnesota	W 96–89	Jimmy Butler (28)	Pau Gasol (12)	Pau Gasol (8)	United Center; 21,635	37–22

March : 8–7 (home: 6–2; road: 2–5)

Game	Date	Team	Score	High points	High rebounds	High assists	Location Attendance	Record
60	March 1; 12:00 pm	L.A. Clippers	L 86–96	Nikola Mirotić (29)	Pau Gasol (15)	Joakim Noah (6)	United Center; 21,680	37–23
61	March 3; 7:00 pm	Washington	W 97–92	Nikola Mirotić (23)	Joakim Noah (12)	Aaron Brooks (8)	United Center; 21,468	38–23
62	March 5; 7:00 pm	Oklahoma City	W 108–105	Nikola Mirotić (23)	Gasol & Noah (12)	Joakim Noah (9)	United Center; 21,696	39–23
63	March 6; 6:00 pm	@ Indiana	L 84–98	Pau Gasol (18)	Pau Gasol (10)	Joakim Noah (11)	Bankers Life Fieldhouse; 18,165	39–24
64	March 8; 12:00 pm (Note: Prior to the March 8 game, daylight saving time will have started on the same day.)	@ San Antonio	L 105–116	Pau Gasol (23)	Pau Gasol (15)	Joakim Noah (9)	AT&T Center; 18,581	39–25
65	March 9; 7:00 pm	Memphis	L 91–101	Tony Snell (21)	Nikola Mirotić (12)	Joakim Noah (6)	United Center; 23,129	39–26
66	March 11; 6:00 pm	@ Philadelphia	W 104–95 (OT)	Aaron Brooks (31)	Pau Gasol (16)	Brooks & Mirotić (5)	Wells Fargo Center; 12,400	40–26
67	March 13; 6:00 pm	@ Charlotte	L 91–101	Aaron Brooks (24)	Nikola Mirotić (9)	Joakim Noah (6)	Time Warner Cable Arena; 19,183	40–27
68	March 15; 12:00 pm	@ Oklahoma City	L 100–109	Nikola Mirotić (27)	Pau Gasol (8)	Joakim Noah (7)	Chesapeake Energy Arena; 18,203	40–28
69	March 18; 7:00 pm	Indiana	W 103–86	Nikola Mirotić (25)	Joakim Noah (14)	Joakim Noah (7)	United Center; 21,753	41–28
70	March 20; 7:00 pm	Toronto	W 108–92	Nikola Mirotić (29)	Joakim Noah (10)	Joakim Noah (14)	United Center; 21,998	42–28
71	March 21; 6:30 pm	@ Detroit	L 91–107	Pau Gasol (27)	Joakim Noah (13)	Joakim Noah (7)	The Palace of Auburn Hills; 20,347	42–29
72	March 23; 7:00 pm	Charlotte	W 98–86	Nikola Mirotić (28)	Pau Gasol (12)	Aaron Brooks (10)	United Center; 21,646	43–29
73	March 25; 6:30 pm	@ Toronto	W 116–103	Jimmy Butler (23)	Mike Dunleavy Jr. (7)	Brooks & Noah (5)	Air Canada Centre; 19,800	44–29
74	March 28; 7:00 pm	New York	W 111–80	Nikola Mirotić (22)	Pau Gasol (12)	Brooks & Snell (5)	United Center; 22,152	45–29

April : 5–3 (home: 3–0; road: 2–3)

Game	Date	Team	Score	High points	High rebounds	High assists	Location Attendance	Record
75	April 1; 7:00 pm	@ Milwaukee	L 91–95	Jimmy Butler (25)	Pau Gasol (11)	Mike Dunleavy Jr. (5)	BMO Harris Bradley Center; 15,215	45–30
76	April 3; 7:00 pm	Detroit	W 88–82	Pau Gasol (26)	Pau Gasol (10)	Joakim Noah (10)	United Center; 22,058	46–30
77	April 5; 2:30 pm	@ Cleveland	L 94–99	Mike Dunleavy Jr. (24)	Nikola Mirotić (10)	Joakim Noah (7)	Quicken Loans Arena; 20,562	46–31
78	April 8; 6:00 pm	@ Orlando	L 103–105	Jimmy Butler (19)	Joakim Noah (11)	Jimmy Butler (6)	Amway Center; 18,249	46–32
79	April 9; 7:00 pm	@ Miami	W 89–78	Pau Gasol (16)	Pau Gasol (15)	Joakim Noah (4)	American Airlines Arena; 19,641	47–32
80	April 11; 7:00 pm	Philadelphia	W 114–107	Pau Gasol (24)	Pau Gasol (13)	Derrick Rose (8)	United Center; 22,273	48–32
81	April 13; 6:30 pm	@ Brooklyn	W 113–86	Nikola Mirotić (26)	Pau Gasol (11)	Derrick Rose (7)	Barclays Center; 17,732	49–32
82	April 15; 7:00 pm	Atlanta	W 91–85	Aaron Brooks (23)	Pau Gasol (13)	Brooks & Rose (3)	United Center; 22,172	50–32

2014–15 season schedule

== Postseason ==
With the regular season over, the Bulls would be seeded #3 in the Eastern Conference behind the Atlanta Hawks (#1) and the Cleveland Cavaliers (#2). The Bulls would have home-court advantage in the First Round when playing the sixth-seeded Milwaukee Bucks and would lose it when the Cavaliers (Chicago's Conference semifinals opponent) defeated the seventh-seeded Boston Celtics.

=== Milwaukee Bucks ===
In the First Round, the Bulls would meet its Central Division opponent in the Milwaukee Bucks for the first time since the First Round of the 1990 NBA Playoffs. After injuring his anterior cruciate ligament in the 2012 playoff opener against the Philadelphia 76ers, Rose returned to play in his first playoff game since the injury to play the Bucks. In the game, he would accumulate 23 points and seven assists. The second game of the series would get physical as seven technical fouls were called and Bucks player Zaza Pachulia would be ejected. Despite a poor outing from Rose, Butler would go off and score 31 points for the victory. In what would be a crucial Game 3 for the Bucks, the Bulls would hold Milwaukee off in double overtime, which was spearheaded by Rose's 34 points. After scoring playoff career-highs in Games 1 and 2, Butler would have another career-high of 33 points but the Bulls would lose Game 4 with a season-high 26 turnovers. In the closing seconds of the game, Rose would turn over the ball and, after a timeout for the Bucks, Jerryd Bayless would get away from Rose to execute a buzzer-beating layup, causing Chicago to lose 90–92. They then dropped game 5 at home, cutting their lead to 3–2. But despite struggling in the previous two games, the Bulls would finish the series by pummeling the Bucks with a franchise record 54-point blowout victory on the road, surpassing the previous record of 42 that was set in Game 3 of the 1998 NBA Finals against the Utah Jazz. Just before Game 6, it was announced that Nikola Mirotić came in second place in voting for the NBA Rookie of the Year Award for 2014–15.

=== Cleveland Cavaliers ===
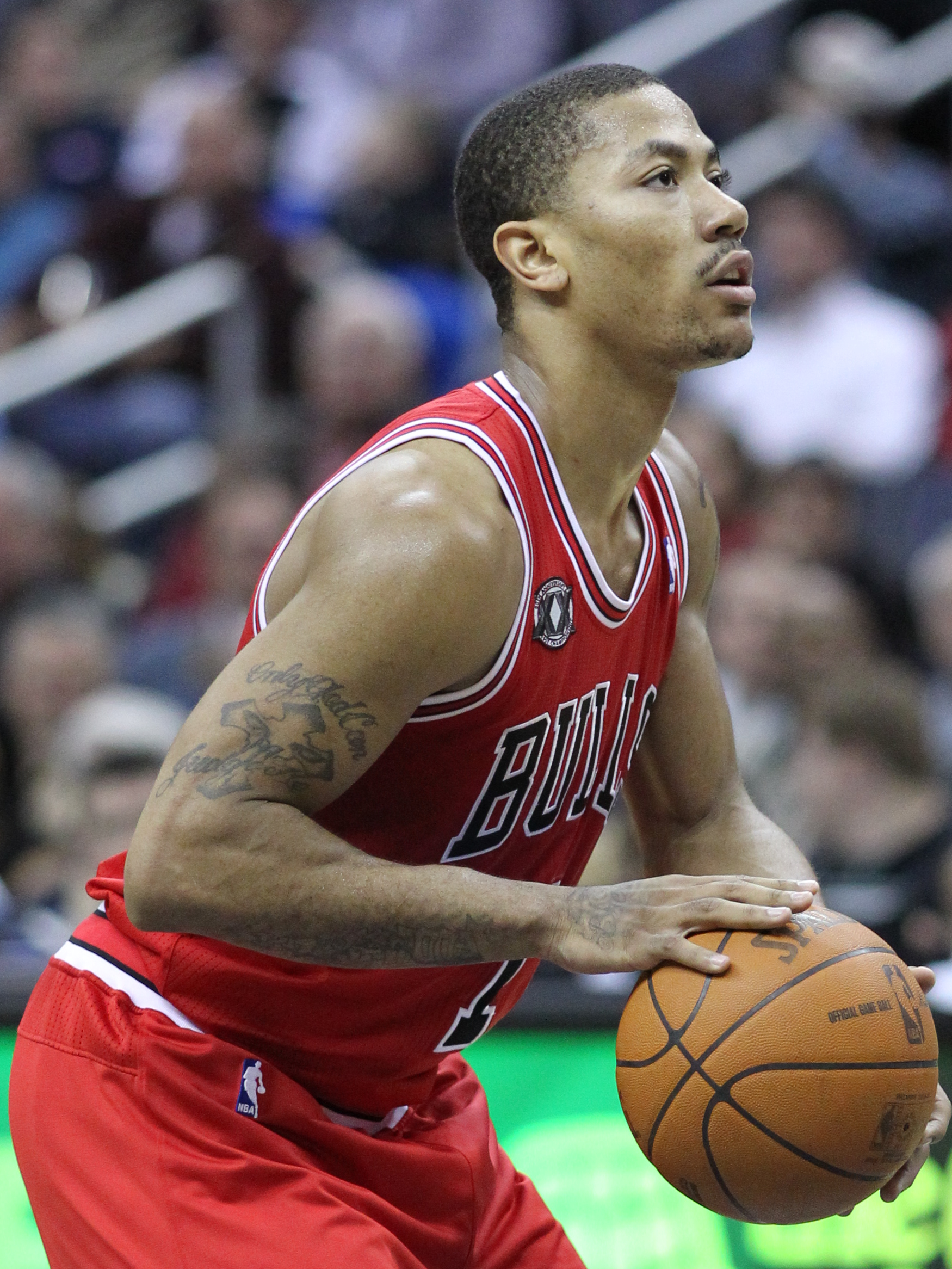
Derrick Rose shot a game-winning three-point buzzer beater in Game 3 to give Chicago a 2–1 series lead against the Cleveland Cavaliers.

After defeating the Milwaukee Bucks, the Bulls would face another divisional rival, the Cleveland Cavaliers, in what was regarded as a marquee match-up. The last time the two teams had played each other was back in the First round of the 2010 NBA Playoffs when the then-first seed Cavaliers would defeat the then-eighth seed Bulls four games to one. For the Cavaliers, they would be playing with Kevin Love out for the rest of the season and J. R. Smith out for Games 1 and 2. However, at this time for the Bulls, it was reported that there had been a long-standing feud between Bulls head coach Tom Thibodeau and the organization's management. Despite the dysfunction in the Bulls organization, the team itself would take Game 1 in a 99–92 victory after Rose who scored 23 points had an injury scare. On May 6, it was reported that Jimmy Butler won the NBA Most Improved Player Award thus becoming the first Bull in franchise history to win it. In Game 2, Chicago would be blown out by Cleveland and was dealt its first loss of the series. At halftime, Joakim Noah would shove a fan which led to a $25,000 fine.

After splitting the first two games, the series would continue at the United Center for Game 3. Up until the third game, there were no lead changes because the Bulls always led in Game 1 and the Cavaliers always led in Game 2. In an evenly matched game, the Bulls and Cavaliers both played with grit but the Bulls would pull through after Derrick Rose shot a game-winning three-point buzzer beater to win the game 99–96. Aside from the fact that the shot was his second career buzzer beater, it was the first playoff buzzer beater for the team since Michael Jordan's buzzer beater in Game 1 of the 1997 NBA Finals and the team's last game-winning shot in the last ten seconds since Jordan's memorable championship-winning shot with 5.2 seconds remaining in Game 6 of the 1998 NBA Finals. During the game, Pau Gasol would be taken out because of a hamstring injury.

On May 9, talk of the possibility of having two champions in the same city and season began. The Chicago Blackhawks were en route to the Conference Final of the 2015 Stanley Cup playoffs and the Bulls were up 2–1 in the conference semifinals against the Cavaliers. The next day, Butler, whose contract would expire at the end of the season, would state that he planned to remain with the Bulls. This was after rejecting a four-year, $42 million contract back in October 2014. In Game 4, with the game tied 84 apiece, LeBron James would return the favor with a two-point buzzer beater, causing the Bulls to lose 84–86.

=== Game log ===
2015 playoff game log
Total: 6–6 (home: 3–3; road: 3–3)
First Round: 4–2 (home: 2–1; road: 2–1)

Game	Date	Team	Score	High points	High rebounds	High assists	Location Attendance	Series
1	April 18; 6:00 pm	Milwaukee	W 103–91	Jimmy Butler (25)	Pau Gasol (13)	Derrick Rose (7)	United Center; 21,812	1–0
2	April 20; 7:00 pm	Milwaukee	W 91–82	Jimmy Butler (31)	Joakim Noah (19)	Derrick Rose (9)	United Center; 21,661	2–0
3	April 23; 7:00 pm	@ Milwaukee	W 113–106 (2OT)	Derrick Rose (34)	Pau Gasol (12)	Derrick Rose (8)	BMO Harris Bradley Center; 18,717	3–0
4	April 25; 4:30 pm	@ Milwaukee	L 90–92	Jimmy Butler (33)	Pau Gasol (10)	Derrick Rose (6)	BMO Harris Bradley Center; 18,717	3–1
5	April 27; 7:00 pm	Milwaukee	L 88–94	Pau Gasol (25)	Joakim Noah (13)	Butler & Noah (6)	United Center; 21,814	3–2
6	April 30; 6:00 pm	@ Milwaukee	W 120–66	Mike Dunleavy Jr. (20)	Joakim Noah (10)	Derrick Rose (7)	BMO Harris Bradley Center; 18,717	4–2

Conference Semifinals: 2–4 (home: 1–2; road: 1–2)

Game	Date	Team	Score	High points	High rebounds	High assists	Location Attendance	Series
1	May 4; 6:00 pm	@ Cleveland	W 99–92	Derrick Rose (25)	Pau Gasol (10)	Jimmy Butler (6)	Quicken Loans Arena; 20,562	1–0
2	May 6; 6:00 pm	@ Cleveland	L 91–106	Jimmy Butler (18)	Noah & Rose (7)	Derrick Rose (10)	Quicken Loans Arena; 20,562	1–1
3	May 8; 7:00 pm	Cleveland	W 99–96	Derrick Rose (30)	Joakim Noah (11)	Derrick Rose (7)	United Center; 22,246	2–1
4	May 10; 2:30 pm	Cleveland	L 84–86	Derrick Rose (31)	Joakim Noah (15)	Derrick Rose (4)	United Center; 22,256	2–2
5	May 12; 6:00 pm	@ Cleveland	L 101–106	Jimmy Butler (29)	Three players (9)	Derrick Rose (7)	Quicken Loans Arena; 20,562	2–3
6	May 14; 7:00 pm	Cleveland	L 73–94	Jimmy Butler (20)	Joakim Noah (11)	Derrick Rose (6)	United Center; 22,695	2–4

2015 playoff schedule

== Player statistics ==
Legend
GP	Games played	GS	Games started	MPG	Minutes per game
FG%	Field-goal percentage	3P%	3-point field-goal percentage	FT%	Free-throw percentage
RPG	Rebounds per game	APG	Assists per game	SPG	Steals per game
BPG	Blocks per game	PPG	Points per game

=== Summer League ===
Player	GP	GS	MPG	FG%	3P%	FT%	RPG	APG	SPG	BPG	PPG
Cameron Bairstow	5	5	26.2	.531	1.000	.727	7.0	1.4	0.8	0.6	10.2
Billy Baron	5	0	18.4	.257	.263	.556	3.4	2.4	1.2	0.0	5.6
Austin Freeman	5	0	20.0	.438	.273	.000	2.8	0.8	0.8	0.2	6.8
Davante Gardner	4	0	3.3	.556	.400	.000	1.5	0.0	0.0	0.0	3.0
Lazeric Jones	5	5	21.8	.514	.667	.800	2.4	4.6	1.0	0.2	10.8
Doug McDermott	4	4	28.8	.442	.444	.957	4.0	2.8	0.0	0.8	18.0
Brandon Paul	0	0	0.0	.000	.000	.000	0.0	0.0	0.0	0.0	0.0
Chad Posthumus	4	0	12.0	.400	.000	.500	2.5	0.3	0.3	0.3	3.3
Tony Snell	5	5	30.2	.466	.500	.833	4.0	2.8	0.8	0.6	20.0
Lance Thomas	5	5	21.8	.583	.000	.769	4.4	0.4	0.4	0.2	7.6
David Wear	5	0	14.6	.556	.600	1.000	2.0	0.2	0.8	0.2	4.8
Kendall Williams	5	1	12.0	.231	.500	1.000	1.2	0.8	1.0	0.0	2.0
Totals	5	—	—	.453	.423	.785	33.6	15.8	7.0	2.8	87.2

Source: NBA.com

Sabremetrics

Player	GP	GS	MPG	FG%	3P%	FT%	RPG	APG	SPG	BPG	PPG		
Cameron Bairstow	.612	.547	9.51	21.51	15.81	8.65	1.55	1.83	16.10	17.29	117.8	90.9	18.48
Billy Baron	.359	.329	2.70	18.31	10.90	19.99	3.29	0.00	9.31	21.21	86.3	89.6	11.22
Austin Freeman	.524	.531	2.49	13.51	8.27	6.57	2.02	0.80	8.47	16.14	103.3	93.6	13.97
Davante Gardner	.636	.667	19.08	37.30	28.30	0.00	0.00	0.00	9.58	36.90	109.7	93.0	39.60
Lazeric Jones	.619	.568	4.55	8.23	6.48	36.56	2.31	0.73	13.83	21.06	127.7	94.7	26.93
Doug McDermott	.678	.581	0.00	14.75	8.31	15.22	0.00	2.04	18.43	25.87	118.1	94.1	24.33
Brandon Paul	.000	.000	0.00	0.00	0.00	0.00	0.00	0.00	0.00	0.00	0.0	0.0	0.00
Chad Posthumus	.409	.400	12.71	12.42	12.57	3.08	1.04	1.65	27.42	20.61	74.5	96.7	3.59
Tony Snell	.618	.582	4.11	11.17	7.82	17.67	1.34	1.58	6.90	26.17	125.3	95.3	29.13
Lance Thomas	.639	.583	3.43	19.64	11.94	2.96	0.93	0.73	11.86	14.10	119.7	93.8	15.94
David Wear	.651	.639	5.14	10.84	8.13	2.25	2.78	1.10	9.78	12.80	122.5	92.6	16.21
Kendall Williams	.360	.308	0.00	11.27	5.92	9.55	4.22	0.00	17.77	12.82	74.8	90.0	5.62
Totals	.577	.532	22.36	74.16	49.56	52.67	8.83	5.58	14.09	—	110.6	93.1	—

Source: RealGM.com

=== Preseason ===
Player	GP	GS	MPG	FG%	3P%	FT%	RPG	APG	SPG	BPG	PPG
Cameron Bairstow	2	0	7.0	.000	.000	.250	2.0	1.0	0.0	0.0	0.5
Aaron Brooks	8	0	19.5	.373	.385	1.000	1.4	2.6	0.8	0.1	8.1
Jimmy Butler	6	6	25.9	.588	.200	.791	4.7	2.3	1.7	1.0	15.8
Mike Dunleavy Jr.	6	6	24.5	.425	.440	.929	4.3	0.3	0.7	0.2	9.7
Kim English	0	0	0.0	.000	.000	.000	0.0	0.0	0.0	0.0	0.0
Pau Gasol	8	8	27.5	.403	.667	.815	8.3	2.1	0.3	2.4	10.8
Taj Gibson	8	1	26.4	.478	.000	.737	6.1	0.9	1.1	1.1	11.8
Ben Hansbrough	0	0	0.0	.000	.000	.000	0.0	0.0	0.0	0.0	0.0
Kirk Hinrich	8	2	25.1	.407	.259	.800	1.4	3.3	0.6	0.1	7.9
Solomon Jones	2	0	11.5	.333	.000	.000	2.0	0.5	0.0	0.0	1.0
Doug McDermott	8	2	25.6	.351	.286	.750	4.9	1.5	0.3	0.1	8.3
Nikola Mirotić	8	0	16.6	.364	.350	.692	2.3	0.6	1.5	0.8	6.0
Nazr Mohammed	1	0	11.3	.000	.000	1.000	2.0	0.0	0.0	0.0	2.0
E'Twaun Moore	2	0	1.1	.000	.000	.000	0.0	0.0	0.0	0.0	0.0
Joakim Noah	7	7	23.6	.438	.000	.706	8.3	3.9	0.6	0.7	5.7
Derrick Rose	8	8	21.9	.484	.433	.844	3.5	2.9	0.4	0.0	16.5
Tony Snell	8	0	15.6	.289	.200	.667	2.5	0.6	0.3	0.0	4.4

Source: RealGM.com

Sabremetrics

Player	TS%	eFG%	ORB%	DRB%	TRB%	AST%	STL%	BLK%	TOV%	USG%	ORtg	DRtg	PER
Cameron Bairstow	.181	.000	0.00	31.52	16.87	20.20	0.00	0.00	0.00	8.88	73.1	101.0	3.01
Aaron Brooks	.509	.458	4.25	3.44	3.84	24.65	1.94	0.49	17.99	22.13	98.5	104.2	12.81
Jimmy Butler	.679	.598	9.46	10.09	9.79	19.62	3.24	3.02	11.40	22.91	131.9	93.2	33.42
Mike Dunleavy Jr.	.628	.562	1.50	18.72	9.93	2.28	1.37	0.52	9.77	15.45	119.2	104.4	14.27
Kim English	.000	.000	0.00	0.00	0.00	0.00	0.00	0.00	0.00	0.00	0.00	0.00	0.00
Pau Gasol	.484	.416	6.02	26.33	16.32	14.14	0.46	6.65	21.26	22.74	88.5	96.2	15.38
Taj Gibson	.548	.478	8.88	16.26	12.62	6.24	2.15	3.28	12.28	20.52	108.3	98.0	19.66
Ben Hansbrough	.000	.000	0.00	0.00	0.00	0.00	0.00	0.00	0.00	0.00	0.00	0.00	0.00
Kirk Hinrich	.497	.466	0.55	5.36	2.99	22.88	1.26	0.38	9.94	15.59	106.4	105.3	11.57
Solomon Jones	.333	.333	9.62	10.42	10.00	7.87	0.00	0.00	57.14	13.72	47.1	101.6	-9.78
Doug McDermott	.488	.421	2.70	17.82	10.36	9.94	0.49	0.38	12.89	16.80	97.8	103.3	10.71
Nikola Mirotić	.483	.443	5.01	9.74	7.41	6.68	4.58	3.50	19.44	20.70	86.3	94.3	11.29
Nazr Mohammed	.258	.000	11.74	9.79	10.68	0.00	0.00	0.00	0.00	15.83	79.6	111.9	-0.17
E'Twaun Moore	.000	.000	0.00	0.00	0.00	0.00	0.00	0.00	0.00	0.00	0.00	111.9	0.00
Joakim Noah	.507	.438	11.74	25.92	18.85	26.99	1.23	2.30	26.18	14.30	104.4	96.8	16.41
Derrick Rose	.605	.553	2.52	14.71	8.70	30.93	0.87	0.00	10.65	30.91	117.0	103.7	28.92
Tony Snell	.367	.344	3.53	13.75	8.71	6.86	0.81	0.00	11.19	19.04	77.2	104.0	3.92

Source: RealGM.com

=== Regular season ===
Player	GP	GS	MPG	FG%	3P%	FT%	RPG	APG	SPG	BPG	PPG
Aaron Brooks	82	21	23.0	.421	.387	.833	2.0	3.2	.7	.2	11.6
Nikola Mirotić	82	3	20.2	.405	.316	.803	4.9	1.2	.7	.7	10.2
Pau Gasol	78	78	34.4	.494	.462	.803	11.8	2.7	.3	1.9	18.5
Tony Snell	72	22	19.6	.429	.371	.800	2.4	.9	.4	.2	6.0
Joakim Noah	67	67	30.6	.445	.000	.603	9.6	4.7	.7	1.1	7.2
Kirk Hinrich	66	22	24.4	.373	.345	.700	1.8	2.2	.7	.2	5.7
Jimmy Butler	65	65	38.7	.462	.378	.834	5.8	3.3	1.8	.6	20.0
Mike Dunleavy Jr.	63	63	29.2	.435	.407	.805	3.9	1.8	.6	.3	9.4
Taj Gibson	62	17	27.3	.502		.717	6.4	1.1	.6	1.2	10.3
E'Twaun Moore	56	0	9.0	.446	.342	.600	.8	.6	.4	.1	2.7
Derrick Rose	51	51	30.0	.405	.280	.813	3.2	4.9	.7	.3	17.7
Doug McDermott	36	0	8.9	.402	.317	.667	1.2	.2	.1	.0	3.0
Nazr Mohammed	23	0	5.6	.433		.333	1.7	.1	.2	.2	1.2
Cameron Bairstow	18	1	3.6	.214		.800	.4	.1	.1	.1	.6

=== Playoffs ===
Player	GP	GS	MPG	FG%	3P%	FT%	RPG	APG	SPG	BPG	PPG
Jimmy Butler	12	12	42.2	.441	.389	.819	5.6	3.2	2.4	.8	22.9
Derrick Rose	12	12	37.8	.396	.348	.897	4.8	6.5	1.2	.5	20.3
Joakim Noah	12	12	32.9	.408		.350	11.0	3.2	.8	1.2	5.8
Mike Dunleavy Jr.	12	12	32.4	.489	.482	.947	4.0	2.6	.8	.4	10.9
Taj Gibson	12	2	23.0	.472		.700	5.5	1.0	.3	1.0	7.4
Aaron Brooks	12	0	11.0	.344	.308	.571	1.5	.9	.3	.1	4.5
Nikola Mirotić	11	0	14.9	.303	.233	.800	2.7	.8	.5	.5	5.7
Tony Snell	11	0	12.7	.341	.333	1.000	1.5	.5	.0	.3	3.9
Pau Gasol	10	10	31.7	.487	.000	.762	9.4	3.1	.5	2.1	14.4
Kirk Hinrich	10	0	12.6	.474	.600	.667	.5	1.1	.3	.1	2.6
Nazr Mohammed	3	0	4.7	.286	.000		1.7	.0	.0	.3	1.3
Doug McDermott	3	0	3.3	.333	.500	1.000	.7	.3	.0	.0	1.7
E'Twaun Moore	3	0	3.0	.333	1.000		1.0	.0	.7	.0	1.7

=== Technical and flagrant fouls ===
Individual	Technicals		Flagrant I		Flagrant II	
Individual	Preseason	Regular season	Preseason	Regular season	Preseason	Regular season
Aaron Brooks	1	4	0	0	0	0
Jimmy Butler	0	1	0	0	0	0
Mike Dunleavy Jr.	0	1	0	1	0	0
Kirk Hinrich	0	2	0	0	0	0
Joakim Noah	0	2	0	0	0	0
Tom Thibodeau	2	2	—	—	—	—

=== Game highs ===
	Preseason	Months							Postseason
	Preseason	October	November	December	January	February	March	April	Postseason
Points	30	22	32	—	—	—	—	—	TBD
Rebounds	17	13	16	—	—	—	—	—	TBD
Assists	9	8	8	—	—	—	—	—	TBD
Steals	4	2	4	—	—	—	—	—	TBD
Turnovers	7	2	5	—	—	—	—	—	TBD
Blocks	4	6	4	—	—	—	—	—	TBD
Three pointers	4	4	5	—	—	—	—	—	TBD
Free throws	12	7	18	—	—	—	—	—	TBD

== Absences ==
Player	Duration		Part of season	Reason	Game(s) missed
Player	Start	End	Part of season	Reason	Game(s) missed
Mike Dunleavy Jr.	October 11, 2014	October 11, 2014	Preseason	Left knee soreness	1
Mike Dunleavy Jr.	October 16, 2014	October 16, 2014	Preseason	Left knee injury	1
Jimmy Butler	October 20, 2014	October 31, 2014	Pre-, regular season	Sprained left thumb	4
Taj Gibson	November 1, 2014	November 1, 2014	Regular season	Sprained left ankle	1
Joakim Noah	November 4, 2014	November 5, 2014	Regular season	Illness	2
Derrick Rose	November 7, 2014	November 9, 2014	Regular season	Sprained left ankle	2
Cameron Bairstow	November 10, 2014	November 15, 2014	Regular season	Unknown	2
Derrick Rose	November 15, 2014	November 24, 2014	Regular season	Strained hamstring	4
Pau Gasol	November 17, 2014	November 24, 2014	Regular season	Strained calf	3
Kirk Hinrich	November 21, 2014	November 24, 2014	Regular season	Chest contusion	2
Taj Gibson	November 24, 2014	—	Regular season	Sprained ankle	6
Joakim Noah	November 25, 2014	November 28, 2014	Regular season	Sore left knee and an eye abrasion	1
Doug McDermott	December 2, 2014	—	Regular season	Right knee injury	2
Derrick Rose	February 24, 2015	April 8, 2015	Regular season	Torn meniscus right knee	20

=== Payroll ===
Legend
Free agent	Player option	Team option	Early termination option
Former players*

Player	Salary				Signed using	Guaranteed
Player	2014–15	2015–16	2016–17	2017–18	Signed using	Guaranteed
Derrick Rose	$18,862,875	$20,093,063	$21,323,250		Bird rights	$60,279,188
Joakim Noah	$12,200,000	$13,400,000			Bird rights	$25,600,000
Taj Gibson	$8,000,000	$8,500,000	$8,950,000		Bird rights	$25,450,000
Pau Gasol	$7,128,000	$7,448,760	$7,769,520		Cap space	$14,576,760
Nikola Mirotić	$5,305,000	$5,543,725	$5,782,450		Cap space	$16,631,175
Mike Dunleavy Jr.	$3,326,235				Mini MLE	$3,326,235
Kirk Hinrich	$2,730,000	$2,870,000			Room exception	$2,730,000
Doug McDermott	$2,277,960	$2,380,440	$2,483,040	$3,294,994	First-round pick	$4,658,400
Jimmy Butler	$2,008,748				First-round pick	$2,008,748
Tony Snell	$1,472,400	$1,535,880	$2,368,327		First-round pick	$1,472,400
Aaron Brooks	$1,145,685				Minimum salary	$1,145,685
Nazr Mohammed	$1,448,490				Minimum salary	$1,448,490
E'Twaun Moore	$948,163	$1,015,421			Minimum salary	$425,000
Cameron Bairstow	$507,336	$845,059	$980,431		Cap space	$932,336
Carlos Boozer*	$13,550,000					
Richard Hamilton*	$333,333	$333,333				$666,666

Source: Basketball-Reference (through Wayback Machine)

== D-League ==
After the Iowa Energy entered a single-affiliation partnership with the Memphis Grizzlies on May 6, 2014, the Bulls would be affiliated with the Fort Wayne Mad Ants starting in the 2014–15 NBA Development League season.
