= 2014–15 Milwaukee Bucks season =

NBA professional basketball team season

- Head coach: Jason Kidd
- General manager: John Hammond
- Owners: Wesley Edens & Marc Lasry
- Arena: Bradley Center

Results
- Record: 41–41 (.500)
- Place: Division: 3rd (Central); Conference: 6th (Eastern)
- Playoff finish: First Round (lost to Bulls 2–4)
- Stats at Basketball Reference

Local media
- Television: Fox Sports Wisconsin
- Radio: WTMJ (AM)

The 2014–15 Milwaukee Bucks season was the 47th season of the franchise in the National Basketball Association (NBA). On December 27, 2014, they matched the total number of wins (15) from the 2013–14 season, their lowest in franchise history.

The Bucks finished the regular season 41–41, a 26 win improvement from their disappointing previous season, and clinched the sixth seed despite losing their top pick Jabari Parker to an injury early in the season. The Bucks' season ended with a 2–4 first round playoff series loss to the Chicago Bulls.

== Offseason ==
=== Draft picks ===
Round	Pick	Player	Position	Nationality	College/Club
1	2	Jabari Parker	SF	United States	Duke
2	31	Damien Inglis	SF	France	Chorale Roanne Basket
2	36	Johnny O'Bryant III	PF	United States	Louisiana State
2	48	Lamar Patterson	SG	United States	Pittsburgh

== Roster ==
2014-15 Milwaukee Bucks roster
Players

Pos.	No.	Player	Height	Weight	DOB	From
SF	34	Giannis Antetokounmpo	6 ft 11 in (2.11 m)	215 lb (98 kg)	1994–12–06	Greece
PG	19	Jerryd Bayless	6 ft 3 in (1.91 m)	200 lb (91 kg)	1988–08–20	Arizona
PG	5	Michael Carter-Williams	6 ft 6 in (1.98 m)	185 lb (84 kg)	1991–10–10	Syracuse
SF	9	Jared Dudley	6 ft 7 in (2.01 m)	225 lb (102 kg)	1985–07–10	Boston College
PG	11	Tyler Ennis	6 ft 3 in (1.91 m)	180 lb (82 kg)	1994–08–24	Syracuse
PG	13	Jorge Gutiérrez	6 ft 3 in (1.91 m)	195 lb (88 kg)	1988–12–27	California
PF	31	John Henson	6 ft 11 in (2.11 m)	220 lb (100 kg)	1990–12–28	North Carolina
PF	7	Ersan İlyasova	6 ft 10 in (2.08 m)	235 lb (107 kg)	1987–05–15	Turkey
SF	17	Damien Inglis	6 ft 9 in (2.06 m)	240 lb (109 kg)	1995–05–20	INSEP
SG	00	O. J. Mayo	6 ft 5 in (1.96 m)	210 lb (95 kg)	1987–11–05	USC
SG	22	Khris Middleton	6 ft 8 in (2.03 m)	217 lb (98 kg)	1991–08–12	Texas A&M
PF	3	Johnny O'Bryant	6 ft 9 in (2.06 m)	256 lb (116 kg)	1993–06–01	LSU
C	27	Zaza Pachulia	6 ft 11 in (2.11 m)	275 lb (125 kg)	1984–02–10	Georgia
SF	12	Jabari Parker	6 ft 8 in (2.03 m)	235 lb (107 kg)	1995–03–15	Duke
C	21	Miles Plumlee	6 ft 11 in (2.11 m)	255 lb (116 kg)	1988–09–01	Duke

Coaches
Head coach
- Jason Kidd
Assistant(s)
- Greg Foster
- Eric Hughes
- Josh Oppenheimer
- Joe Prunty
- Sean Sweeney

Legend
- (DP) Unsigned draft pick
- (FA) Free agent
- (S) Suspended
- (DL) On assignment to D-League affiliate
- Injured

Roster
Updated: 2015–04–07

== Standings ==
Central Division	W	L	PCT	GB	Home	Road	Div	GP
y-Cleveland Cavaliers	53	29	.646	–	31‍–‍10	22‍–‍19	11–5	82
x-Chicago Bulls	50	32	.610	3.0	27‍–‍14	23‍–‍18	8–8	82
x-Milwaukee Bucks	41	41	.500	12.0	23‍–‍18	18‍–‍23	7–9	82
Indiana Pacers	38	44	.463	15.0	23‍–‍18	15‍–‍26	8–8	82
Detroit Pistons	32	50	.390	21.0	18‍–‍23	14‍–‍27	6–10	82

Eastern Conference
#	Team	W	L	PCT	GB	GP
1	c-Atlanta Hawks *	60	22	.732	–	82
2	y-Cleveland Cavaliers *	53	29	.646	7.0	82
3	x-Chicago Bulls	50	32	.610	10.0	82
4	y-Toronto Raptors *	49	33	.598	11.0	82
5	x-Washington Wizards	46	36	.561	14.0	82
6	x-Milwaukee Bucks	41	41	.500	19.0	82
7	x-Boston Celtics	40	42	.488	20.0	82
8	x-Brooklyn Nets	38	44	.463	22.0	82
9	Indiana Pacers	38	44	.463	22.0	82
10	Miami Heat	37	45	.451	23.0	82
11	Charlotte Hornets	33	49	.402	27.0	82
12	Detroit Pistons	32	50	.390	28.0	82
13	Orlando Magic	25	57	.305	35.0	82
14	Philadelphia 76ers	18	64	.220	42.0	82
15	New York Knicks	17	65	.207	43.0	82

== Game log ==
=== Preseason ===
2014 pre-season game log
Total: 3–4 (home: 1–2; road: 2–2)
Pre-season: 3–4 (home: 1–2; road: 2–2)

Game	Date	Team	Score	High points	High rebounds	High assists	Location Attendance	Record
1	October 8	Memphis	W 86–83	Khris Middleton (17)	Larry Sanders (15)	Brandon Knight (6)	Resch Center; 4,685	1–0
2	October 9	@ Detroit	L 80–94	Khris Middleton (13)	Giannis Antetokounmpo (7)	Brandon Knight (7)	Palace of Auburn Hills; 8,472	1–1
3	October 11	Chicago	L 85–91	Larry Sanders (14)	Zaza Pachulia (11)	Kendall Marshall (6)	BMO Harris Bradley Center; 10,769	1–2
4	October 14	@ Cleveland	L 100–106	Jabari Parker (18)	Ersan İlyasova (9)	Jerryd Bayless (9)	Quicken Loans Arena; 19,102	1–3
5	October 17	@ Minnesota	W 105–98	Jabari Parker (21)	Jabari Parker (11)	Kendall Marshall (6)	U.S. Cellular Center; 6,801	2–3
6	October 20	@ New York	W 120–107	O. J. Mayo (24)	John Henson (10)	Kendall Marshall (5)	Madison Square Garden; 19,812	3–3
7	October 22	Minnesota	L 91–110	Jabari Parker (18)	Jabari Parker (9)	Brandon Knight (6)	BMO Harris Bradley Center; 6,103	3–4

2014–15 season schedule

=== Regular season ===
2014–15 game log
Total: 41–41 (home: 23–18; road: 18–23)
October: 1–1 (home: 1–0; road: 0–1)

Game	Date	Team	Score	High points	High rebounds	High assists	Location Attendance	Record
1	October 29	@ Charlotte	L 106–108 (OT)	Brandon Knight (22)	Brandon Knight (8)	Brandon Knight (13)	Time Warner Cable Arena; 19,439	0–1
2	October 31	Philadelphia	W 93–81	O. J. Mayo (25)	Larry Sanders (15)	Brandon Knight (8)	BMO Harris Bradley Center; 18,717	1–1

November : 9–7 (home: 4–3; road: 5–4)

Game	Date	Team	Score	High points	High rebounds	High assists	Location Attendance	Record
3	November 1	@ Washington	L 97–108	Brandon Knight (24)	Jabari Parker (11)	Brandon Knight (6)	Verizon Center; 17,992	1–2
4	November 4	@ Indiana	W 87–81	Brandon Knight (23)	Larry Sanders (10)	O. J. Mayo (5)	Bankers Life Fieldhouse; 15,012	2–2
5	November 5	Chicago	L 86–95	Giannis Antetokounmpo (13)	Sanders & Knight (9)	Brandon Knight (7)	BMO Harris Bradley Center; 13,098	2–3
6	November 7	@ Detroit	L 95–98	Jabari Parker (18)	Brandon Knight (6)	Brandon Knight (9)	The Palace of Auburn Hills; 16,102	2–4
7	November 8	Memphis	W 93–92	Giannis Antetokounmpo (13)	Ersan İlyasova (9)	O. J. Mayo (7)	BMO Harris Bradley Center; 13,841	3–4
8	November 11	Oklahoma City	W 85–78	O. J. Mayo (19)	Zaza Pachulia (10)	Knight & Pachulia (4)	BMO Harris Bradley Center; 13,390	4–4
9	November 14	@ Orlando	L 85–101	Brandon Knight (24)	Giannis Antetokounmpo (7)	Brandon Knight (5)	Amway Center; 15,947	4–5
10	November 16	@ Miami	W 91–84	Brandon Knight (20)	Giannis Antetokounmpo (7)	Brandon Knight (4)	AmericanAirlines Arena; 19,680	5–5
11	November 18	New York	W 117–113	Ersan İlyasova (20)	Zaza Pachulia (13)	Brandon Knight (9)	BMO Harris Bradley Center; 12,190	6–5
12	November 19	@ Brooklyn	W 122–118 (3OT)	Jabari Parker (23)	Giannis Antetokounmpo (12)	Brandon Knight (8)	Barclays Center; 15,694	7–5
13	November 21	@ Toronto	L 83–124	Jabari Parker (15)	Jabari Parker (6)	Kendall Marshall (4)	Air Canada Centre; 19,800	7–6
14	November 22	Washington	L 100–111	Brandon Knight (27)	Zaza Pachulia (7)	Brandon Knight (6)	BMO Harris Bradley Center; 14,254	7–7
15	November 25	Detroit	W 98–86	Brandon Knight (20)	Parker, Sanders & İlyasova (9)	Brandon Knight (8)	BMO Harris Bradley Center; 15,265	8–7
16	November 26	@ Minnesota	W 103–86	Sanders & Knight (15)	Giannis Antetokounmpo (8)	Antetokounmpo & Bayless (4)	Target Center; 14,710	9–7
17	November 28	@ Detroit	W 104–88	Ersan İlyasova (22)	Giannis Antetokounmpo (9)	Kendall Marshall (8)	The Palace of Auburn Hills; 13,127	10–7
18	November 29	Houston	L 103–117	Jabari Parker (19)	Jabari Parker (9)	Jabari Parker (5)	BMO Harris Bradley Center; 16,119	10–8

December : 7–8 (home: 2–3; road: 5–5)

Game	Date	Team	Score	High points	High rebounds	High assists	Location Attendance	Record
19	December 2	@ Cleveland	L 108–111	Brandon Knight (27)	Jabari Parker (8)	Brandon Knight (8)	Quicken Loans Arena; 20,562	10–9
20	December 3	Dallas	L 105–107	Brandon Knight (25)	Zaza Pachulia (9)	Knight, Mayo & Antetokounmpo (5)	BMO Harris Bradley Center; 13,568	10–10
21	December 5	Miami	W 109–85	Kendall Marshall (20)	Zaza Pachulia (8)	Jerryd Bayless (5)	BMO Harris Bradley Center; 16,325	11–10
22	December 7	@ Dallas	L 102–125	Giannis Antetokounmpo (18)	Larry Sanders (9)	Brandon Knight (5)	American Airlines Center; 19,413	11–11
23	December 9	@ Oklahoma City	L 101–114	O. J. Mayo (18)	Giannis Antetokounmpo (7)	Jerryd Bayless (6)	Chesapeake Energy Arena; 18,203	11–12
24	December 13	L.A. Clippers	W 111–106	Brandon Knight (22)	Larry Sanders (9)	Kendall Marshall (6)	BMO Harris Bradley Center; 16,227	12–12
25	December 15	@ Phoenix	W 96–94	Brandon Knight (20)	Giannis Antetokounmpo (8)	Pachulia & Dudley (5)	U.S. Airways Center; 17,327	13–12
26	December 17	@ Portland	L 97–104	Brandon Knight (24)	Zaza Pachulia (8)	Jared Dudley (5)	Moda Center; 19,495	13–13
27	December 18	@ Sacramento	W 108–107	Brandon Knight (20)	Pachulia, Knight & Dudley (5)	Kendall Marshall (6)	Sleep Train Arena; 15,645	14–13
28	December 20	@ L.A. Clippers	L 102–106	Giannis Antetokounmpo (18)	Giannis Antetokounmpo (9)	Giannis Antetokounmpo (6)	Staples Center; 19,060	14–14
29	December 23	Charlotte	L 101–108	Brandon Knight (34)	Larry Sanders (8)	Brandon Knight (5)	BMO Harris Bradley Center; 14,653	14–15
30	December 26	@ Atlanta	W 107–77	Jared Dudley (24)	Zaza Pachulia (8)	Marshall & Antetokounmpo (5)	Philips Arena; 19,016	15–15
31	December 27	Atlanta	L 85–90	Khris Middleton (21)	Zaza Pachulia (15)	Jerryd Bayless (6)	BMO Harris Bradley Center; 16,788	15–16
32	December 29	@ Charlotte	W 104–94 (OT)	Brandon Knight (18)	Jared Dudley (9)	Kendall Marshall (6)	Time Warner Cable Arena; 17,430	16–16
33	December 31	@ Cleveland	W 96–80	Brandon Knight (26)	Antetokounmpo, Pachulia & Middleton (8)	Giannis Antetokounmpo (5)	Quicken Loans Arena; 20,562	17–16

January : 7–6 (home: 4–4; road: 3–2)

Game	Date	Team	Score	High points	High rebounds	High assists	Location Attendance	Record
34	January 2	Indiana	L 91–94	Brandon Knight (20)	Zaza Pachulia (14)	Brandon Knight (7)	BMO Harris Bradley Center; 16,238	17–17
35	January 4	@ New York	W 95–82	Brandon Knight (17)	Zaza Pachulia (14)	Brandon Knight (5)	Madison Square Garden; 19,812	18–17
36	January 6	Phoenix	L 96–102	Brandon Knight (26)	Giannis Antetokounmpo (12)	Knight & Marshall (4)	BMO Harris Bradley Center; 12,311	18–18
37	January 7	@ Philadelphia	W 97–77	Knight & Middleton (18)	Zaza Pachulia (12)	Zaza Pachulia (7)	Wells Fargo Center; 10,288	19–18
38	January 9	Minnesota	W 98–84	Brandon Knight (14)	Zaza Pachulia (9)	Kendall Marshall (9)	BMO Harris Bradley Center; 15,480	20–18
39	January 10	@ Chicago	L 87–95	Brandon Knight (20)	John Henson (7)	Brandon Knight (5)	United Center; 21,781	20–19
40	January 15	New York	W 95–79	O. J. Mayo (22)	Zaza Pachulia (14)	Brandon Knight (6)	The O2 Arena; 18,689	21–19
41	January 19	Toronto	L 89–92	Brandon Knight (20)	Ersan İlyasova (7)	Knight & Antetokounmpo (5)	BMO Harris Bradley Center; 12,707	21–20
42	January 22	Utah	L 99–101	Knight & Dudley (16)	Zaza Pachulia (10)	Jerryd Bayless (9)	BMO Harris Bradley Center; 12,415	21–21
43	January 24	Detroit	W 101–86	O. J. Mayo (20)	Khris Middleton (7)	Jerryd Bayless (8)	BMO Harris Bradley Center; 16,388	22–21
44	January 25	@ San Antonio	L 95–101	Khris Middleton (21)	John Henson (9)	O. J. Mayo (7)	AT&T Center; 18,581	22–22
45	January 27	@ Miami	W 109–102	Knight & Middleton (17)	John Henson (9)	Jerryd Bayless (7)	AmericanAirlines Arena; 19,789	23–22
46	January 29	@ Orlando	W 115–100	Jerryd Bayless (19)	John Henson (11)	Brandon Knight (9)	Amway Center; 16,071	24–22
47	January 31	Portland	W 95–88	Jared Dudley (18)	Giannis Antetokounmpo (10)	Brandon Knight (8)	BMO Harris Bradley Center; 18,717	25–22

February : 7–4 (home: 6–1; road: 1–3)

Game	Date	Team	Score	High points	High rebounds	High assists	Location Attendance	Record
48	February 2	@ Toronto	W 82–75	Khris Middleton (25)	Giannis Antetokounmpo (12)	Jerryd Bayless (9)	Air Canada Centre; 19,800	26–22
49	February 4	L.A. Lakers	W 113–105 (OT)	Giannis Antetokounmpo (25)	Brandon Knight (8)	Knight & Henson & Middleton (7)	BMO Harris Bradley Center; 12,544	27–22
50	February 6	@ Houston	L 111–117	Giannis Antetokounmpo (27)	Giannis Antetokounmpo (15)	Brandon Knight (11)	Toyota Center; 18,239	27–23
51	February 7	Boston	W 96–93	Brandon Knight (26)	Giannis Antetokounmpo (11)	Knight & Antetokounmpo (5)	BMO Harris Bradley Center; 16,470	28–23
52	February 9	Brooklyn	W 103–97	Jared Dudley (19)	Giannis Antetokounmpo (9)	Giannis Antetokounmpo (8)	BMO Harris Bradley Center; 12,431	29–23
53	February 11	Sacramento	W 111–103	O. J. Mayo (21)	Khris Middleton (10)	Brandon Knight (5)	BMO Harris Bradley Center; 13,046	30–23
All-Star Break
54	February 20	Denver	W 89–81	Khris Middleton (15)	Giannis Antetokounmpo (9)	Jerryd Bayless (8)	BMO Harris Bradley Center; 16,110	31–23
55	February 22	Atlanta	L 86–97	Middleton & Antetokounmpo (19)	John Henson (8)	Khris Middleton (5)	BMO Harris Bradley Center; 14,787	31–24
56	February 23	@ Chicago	L 71–87	Khris Middleton (17)	Ersan İlyasova (11)	Jerryd Bayless (5)	United Center; 21,434	31–25
57	February 25	Philadelphia	W 104–88	Khris Middleton (19)	Giannis Antetokounmpo (11)	Michael Carter-Williams (8)	BMO Harris Bradley Center; 12,763	32–25
58	February 27	@ L. A. Lakers	L 93–101	Ersan İlyasova (17)	Ersan İlyasova (12)	Carter-Williams & Antetokounmpo & Ennis (4)	Staples Center; 18,997	32–26
59	February 28	@ Utah	L 75–82	Khris Middleton (18)	Middleton & Mayo (6)	Zaza Pachulia (5)	Energy Solutions Arena; 19,515	32–27

March : 4–11 (home: 4–4; road: 0–7)

Game	Date	Team	Score	High points	High rebounds	High assists	Location Attendance	Record
60	March 3	@ Denver	L 95–106	Ersan İlyasova (21)	Giannis Antetokounmpo (11)	Khris Middleton (6)	Pepsi Center; 12,234	32–28
61	March 4	@ Golden State	L 93–102	Michael Carter-Williams (16)	Zaza Pachulia (11)	Michael Carter-Williams (7)	Oracle Arena; 19,596	32–29
62	March 7	Washington	W 91–85	Khris Middleton (30)	Khris Middleton (9)	Michael Carter-Williams (9)	BMO Harris Bradley Center; 18,717	33–29
63	March 9	New Orleans	L 103–114	Giannis Antetokounmpo (29)	John Henson (7)	Michael Carter-Williams (7)	BMO Harris Bradley Center; 18,717	33–30
64	March 11	Orlando	W 97–91	Khris Middleton (30)	Zaza Pachulia (12)	Michael Carter-Williams (6)	BMO Harris Bradley Center; 12,593	34–30
65	March 12	@ Indiana	L 103–109 (OT)	Michael Carter-Williams (28)	Zaza Pachulia (12)	Carter-Williams & Ennis (4)	Bankers Life Fieldhouse; 15,729	34–31
66	March 14	@ Memphis	L 81–92	Giannis Antetokounmpo (19)	Giannis Antetokounmpo (6)	Tyler Ennis (11)	FedExForum; 18,119	34–32
67	March 17	@ New Orleans	L 84–85	İlyasova & Antetokounmpo (15)	Zaza Pachulia (11)	Bayless & Antetokounmpo (5)	Smoothie King Center; 17,881	34–33
68	March 18	San Antonio	L 103–114	Giannis Antetokounmpo (19)	Miles Plumlee (11)	Michael Carter-Williams (6)	BMO Harris Bradley Center; 14,831	34–34
69	March 20	@ Brooklyn	L 127–129 (3OT)	Khris Middleton (29)	Zaza Pachulia (21)	Zaza Pachulia (7)	Barclays Center; 16,272	34–35
70	March 22	Cleveland	L 90–108	Michael Carter-Williams (19)	Antetokounmpo & Pachulia (9)	Khris Middleton (7)	BMO Harris Bradley Center; 16,687	34–36
71	March 24	Miami	W 89–88	Ersan İlyasova (19)	İlyasova & Pachulia (11)	Zaza Pachulia (7)	BMO Harris Bradley Center; 12,313	35–36
72	March 26	Indiana	W 111–107	Ersan İlyasova (34)	İlyasova & Pachulia (6)	Michael Carter-Williams (8)	BMO Harris Bradley Center; 15,366	36–36
73	March 28	Golden State	L 95–108	Khris Middleton (14)	John Henson (7)	Bayless & Mayo (5)	BMO Harris Bradley Center; 18,717	36–37
74	March 30	@ Atlanta	L 88–101	Giannis Antetokounmpo (18)	Zaza Pachulia (13)	Bayless & Carter-Williams (5)	Philips Arena; 18,453	36–38

April : 5–3 (home: 2–3; road: 3–0)

Game	Date	Team	Score	High points	High rebounds	High assists	Location Attendance	Record
75	April 1	Chicago	W 95–91	Michael Carter-Williams (21)	Pachulia & Carter-Williams (10)	Dudley & Mayo (5)	BMO Harris Bradley Center; 15,215	37–38
76	April 3	@ Boston	W 110–101	O. J. Mayo (24)	Henson & Pachulia (8)	Michael Carter-Williams (7)	TD Garden; 18,624	38–38
77	April 4	Orlando	L 90–97	Ersan İlyasova (18)	Michael Carter-Williams (10)	Michael Carter-Williams (9)	BMO Harris Bradley Center; 14,090	38–39
78	April 8	Cleveland	L 99–104	Michael Carter-Williams (30)	Zaza Pachulia (10)	Michael Carter-Williams (8)	BMO Harris Bradley Center; 14,629	38–40
79	April 10	@ New York	W 99–91	Giannis Antetokounmpo (20)	Giannis Antetokounmpo (9)	Michael Carter-Williams (7)	Madison Square Garden; 19,812	39–40
80	April 12	Brooklyn	W 96–73	Ersan İlyasova (21)	Giannis Antetokounmpo (9)	Antetokounmpo & Middleton (9)	BMO Harris Bradley Center; 16,504	40–40
81	April 13	@ Philadelphia	W 107–97	Michael Carter-Williams (30)	Giannis Antetokounmpo (7)	Michael Carter-Williams (5)	Wells Fargo Center; 10,598	41–40
82	April 15	Boston	L 100–105	Ersan İlyasova (21)	Johnny O'Bryant (9)	Tyler Ennis (8)	BMO Harris Bradley Center; 17,316	41–41

2014–15 season schedule

== Playoffs ==
2015 playoff game log
Total: 2–4 (home: 1–2; road: 1–2)
First Round: 2–4 (home: 1–2; road: 1–2)

Game	Date	Team	Score	High points	High rebounds	High assists	Location Attendance	Series
1	April 18	@ Chicago	L 91–103	Khris Middleton (18)	Zaza Pachulia (10)	Jerryd Bayless (5)	United Center; 21,812	0–1
2	April 20	@ Chicago	L 82–91	Khris Middleton (22)	Giannis Antetokounmpo (11)	Giannis Antetokounmpo (4)	United Center; 21,661	0–2
3	April 23	Chicago	L 106–113 (2OT)	Giannis Antetokounmpo (25)	John Henson (14)	Michael Carter-Williams (9)	BMO Harris Bradley Center; 18,717	0–3
4	April 25	Chicago	W 92–90	O. J. Mayo (18)	Giannis Antetokounmpo (8)	Carter-Williams, Dudley, Bayless (5)	BMO Harris Bradley Center; 18,717	1–3
5	April 27	@ Chicago	W 94–88	Michael Carter-Williams (22)	John Henson (14)	Michael Carter-Williams (9)	United Center; 21,814	2–3
6	April 30	Chicago	L 66–120	Zaza Pachulia (8)	Miles Plumlee (6)	Jerryd Bayless (5)	BMO Harris Bradley Center; 18,717	2–4

2015 playoff schedule

== Player statistics ==
Legend
GP	Games played	GS	Games started	MPG	Minutes per game
FG%	Field-goal percentage	3P%	3-point field-goal percentage	FT%	Free-throw percentage
RPG	Rebounds per game	APG	Assists per game	SPG	Steals per game
BPG	Blocks per game	PPG	Points per game

=== Regular season ===
Milwaukee Bucks statistics
Player	GP	GS	MPG	FG%	3P%	FT%	RPG	APG	SPG	BPG	PPG
Giannis Antetokounmpo	81	71	31.4	.491	.159	.741	6.7	2.6	.9	1.0	12.7
Khris Middleton	79	58	30.1	.467	.407	.859	4.4	2.3	1.5	.1	13.4
Jerryd Bayless	77	4	22.3	.426	.308	.883	2.7	3.0	.8	.2	7.8
Zaza Pachulia	73	45	23.7	.454	.000	.788	6.8	2.4	1.1	.3	8.3
Jared Dudley	72	22	23.8	.468	.385	.716	3.1	1.8	1.0	.2	7.2
O. J. Mayo	71	15	23.9	.422	.357	.827	2.6	2.8	.8	.3	11.4
John Henson	67	11	18.3	.566		.569	4.7	.9	.4	2.0	7.0
Ersan İlyasova	58	36	22.7	.472	.389	.645	4.8	1.0	.6	.3	11.5
Brandon Knight^{†}	52	52	32.5	.435	.409	.881	4.3	5.4	1.6	.2	17.8
Johnny O'Bryant III	34	15	10.8	.367		.444	1.9	.5	.1	.1	2.9
Kendall Marshall	28	3	14.9	.455	.391	.889	1.0	3.1	.8	.0	4.2
Larry Sanders	27	26	21.7	.500		.500	6.1	.9	1.0	1.4	7.3
Michael Carter-Williams^{†}	25	25	30.3	.429	.143	.780	4.0	5.6	2.0	.5	14.1
Jabari Parker	25	25	29.5	.490	.250	.697	5.5	1.7	1.2	.2	12.3
Tyler Ennis^{†}	25	1	14.1	.350	.270	.600	1.1	2.4	.7	.1	4.0
Miles Plumlee^{†}	19	0	9.9	.492		.375	2.4	.4	.3	.6	3.2
Nate Wolters^{†}	11	0	12.9	.387	.000	.250	1.5	.9	.5	.0	2.3
Kenyon Martin	11	0	9.5	.409		1.000	1.7	.5	.5	.5	1.8
Jorge Gutiérrez^{†}	10	1	13.1	.556	.000	.700	1.8	1.5	.5	.0	3.7
Chris Johnson^{†}	8	0	16.0	.400	.278	1.000	1.4	.6	.6	.3	3.9

=== Playoffs ===
Milwaukee Bucks statistics
Player	GP	GS	MPG	FG%	3P%	FT%	RPG	APG	SPG	BPG	PPG
Khris Middleton	6	6	38.7	.380	.324	.933	3.7	2.0	2.3	.5	15.8
Giannis Antetokounmpo	6	6	33.5	.366	.000	.739	7.0	2.7	.5	1.5	11.5
Michael Carter-Williams	6	6	31.8	.423	.000	.583	4.5	4.8	1.2	1.0	12.2
Ersan İlyasova	6	6	23.7	.328	.217	.700	3.8	.5	.8	.5	8.7
Zaza Pachulia	6	6	21.5	.400		.615	6.7	1.5	1.7	.5	6.7
O. J. Mayo	6	0	26.0	.333	.316	1.000	3.3	3.0	1.2	.2	9.0
John Henson	6	0	25.5	.585	.000	.357	8.0	.7	.8	1.7	8.8
Jerryd Bayless	6	0	20.0	.343	.286	.765	2.5	3.0	.3	.3	6.5
Jared Dudley	6	0	18.3	.467	.571	.571	1.8	1.3	2.0	.3	6.7
Tyler Ennis	1	0	16.0	.222	.200		4.0	3.0	.0	.0	5.0
Miles Plumlee	1	0	16.0	.125		.500	6.0	1.0	.0	1.0	3.0
Johnny O'Bryant III	1	0	12.0	.375			3.0	.0	.0	.0	6.0
Jorge Gutiérrez	1	0	12.0	.500			1.0	1.0	.0	.0	2.0

- ^{†} Denotes player spent time with another team in the season. Stats reflect time with the Bucks only.

== Injuries ==
Player	Duration		Injury type	Games missed
Player	Start	End	Injury type	Games missed

== Transactions ==
=== Overview ===
Players Added

Via draft

- Johnny O'Bryant III
- Jabari Parker

Via trade

- Michael Carter-Williams
- Jared Dudley
- Tyler Ennis
- Miles Plumlee

Via free agency

- Jerryd Bayless
- Jorge Gutiérrez
Players Lost

Via trade

- Carlos Delfino
- Brandon Knight
- Miroslav Raduljica

Via free agency

- Jeff Adrien
- Ramon Sessions
- Ekpe Udoh
- Nate Wolters

Waived

- Larry Sanders

=== Trades ===
August 26, 2014
February 19, 2015
To Milwaukee Bucks

- Jared Dudley
- 2017 first-round pick
To Milwaukee Bucks

- Tyler Ennis (from Phoenix)
- Miles Plumlee (from Phoenix)
- Michael Carter-Williams (Philadelphia)
To Los Angeles Clippers

- Carlos Delfino
- Miroslav Raduljica
- 2015 second-round pick
To Phoenix Suns

- Brandon Knight (from Milwaukee)
- Kendall Marshall (from Milwaukee)

To Philadelphia 76ers

- 2015 first-round pick (from Phoenix)

=== Free agents ===
Player	Signed	Former team
Jerryd Bayless	July 31, 2014	Boston Celtics
