= Plumley (disambiguation) =

Plumley is a village in Cheshire, England.

Plumley may also refer to:

== People ==
- Plumley (surname)

== See also ==
- Plumley railway station, Plumley, Cheshire, England
- Plumlee, surname
- Plumbley (disambiguation)
