= Plumlee =

Plumlee is a surname. Notable people with the surname include:

- Three American basketball players, all brothers:
  - Marshall Plumlee (born 1992)
  - Mason Plumlee (born 1990)
  - Miles Plumlee (born 1988)
- Earl Plumlee, recipient of the Medal of Honor
- John Rhys Plumlee (born 2001), American football player
- Sybil Plumlee (1911–2012), American police officer

== See also ==
- Plumley (surname)
