= Plumbley (disambiguation) =

Plumbley is a hamlet in South Yorkshire, England.

Plumbley may also refer to:

- Mark Plumbley (fl. 2015), a British engineer
- Catherine Plumbley, an Atlantic 21-class lifeboat

== See also ==
- Plumley (disambiguation)
- Pumbley Cove
