= 2016–17 Miami Heat season =

NBA professional basketball team season

- Head coach: Erik Spoelstra
- President: Pat Riley
- General manager: Andy Elisburg
- Owner: Micky Arison
- Arena: American Airlines Arena

Results
- Record: 41–41 (.500)
- Place: Division: 3rd (Southeast); Conference: 9th (Eastern)
- Playoff finish: Did not qualify
- Stats at Basketball Reference

Local media
- Television: Fox Sports Sun
- Radio: 790 AM, "The Ticket"

The 2016–17 Miami Heat season was the 29th season of the franchise in the National Basketball Association (NBA).

After a tumultuous negotiation process, Dwyane Wade decided to leave the Heat and sign with his hometown Chicago Bulls in the offseason. This was the first season without Wade since 2002-03. Although the Heat would re-acquire Wade via a trade with the Cleveland Cavaliers a season later, his departure made Udonis Haslem the new longest tenured player on the roster, as Haslem first joined the Heat in August 2003, a month after Wade did. Furthermore, Chris Bosh missed the entire season and had thought about potentially retiring altogether due to his continuous blood clots. Bosh had not played since February 9, 2016. It was the NBA's first full season without Bosh since 2002-03, and the Heat's first since 2009-10. After spending the next 2 seasons as a free agent, Bosh would later announce his retirement from the NBA on February 12, 2019.

The team got off to an 11–30 start. However, the Heat rallied to go 30–11 down the stretch, only to be eliminated after the last game of the season. They entered game 82 needing a loss from either the Pacers or the Bulls and a victory over the Wizards. However, despite a 110–102 win over the Washington Wizards, both the Pacers and the Bulls won their games. The Heat finished tied with the Chicago Bulls with identical 41–41 records but the Bulls won the head-to-head tie breaker against the Heat 2–1. As a result, the Heat missed the playoffs for the second time in three years.

Hassan Whiteside earned praise for being the NBA's leading rebounder after ending his previous season as the leading shot blocker in the NBA.

== Draft picks ==
The Heat did not have a pick in the 2016 NBA Draft.

== Roster ==
2016–17 Miami Heat roster
Players

Pos.	No.	Player	Height	Weight	DOB	From
SF	5	Luke Babbitt	6 ft 9 in (2.06 m)	225 lb (102 kg)	1989–06–20	Nevada
PF	1	Chris Bosh	6 ft 11 in (2.11 m)	235 lb (107 kg)	1984–03–24	Georgia Tech
PG	7	Goran Dragić	6 ft 3 in (1.91 m)	190 lb (86 kg)	1986–05–06	Slovenia
SG	2	Wayne Ellington	6 ft 4 in (1.93 m)	200 lb (91 kg)	1987–11–29	North Carolina
PF	40	Udonis Haslem	6 ft 8 in (2.03 m)	235 lb (107 kg)	1980–06–09	Florida
SF	16	James Johnson	6 ft 9 in (2.06 m)	250 lb (113 kg)	1987–02–20	Wake Forest
PG	8	Tyler Johnson	6 ft 4 in (1.93 m)	186 lb (84 kg)	1992–05–07	Fresno State
SG	17	Rodney McGruder	6 ft 4 in (1.93 m)	205 lb (93 kg)	1991–07–29	Kansas State
PF	4	Josh McRoberts	6 ft 10 in (2.08 m)	240 lb (109 kg)	1987–02–28	Duke
C	35	Willie Reed	6 ft 11 in (2.11 m)	250 lb (113 kg)	1990–05–16	Saint Louis
SG	0	Josh Richardson	6 ft 6 in (1.98 m)	200 lb (91 kg)	1993–09–15	Tennessee
SG	11	Dion Waiters	6 ft 4 in (1.93 m)	220 lb (100 kg)	1991–12–10	Syracuse
SF	15	Okaro White	6 ft 8 in (2.03 m)	204 lb (93 kg)	1992–08–13	Florida State
C	21	Hassan Whiteside	7 ft 0 in (2.13 m)	265 lb (120 kg)	1989–06–13	Marshall
SF	20	Justise Winslow	6 ft 7 in (2.01 m)	225 lb (102 kg)	1996–03–26	Duke

Coaches
Head coach
- Erik Spoelstra
Assistant(s)
- Dan Craig
- Juwan Howard
- Octavio De La Grana (Player Development)
- Chris Quinn (Player Development)

Legend
- (DP) Unsigned draft pick
- (FA) Free agent
- (S) Suspended
- (DL) On assignment to D-League affiliate
- Injured

Roster
Updated: 2017–04–03

== Standings ==
=== Division ===
Southeast Division	W	L	PCT	GB	Home	Road	Div	GP
y – Washington Wizards	49	33	.598	–	30‍–‍11	19‍–‍22	8–8	82
x – Atlanta Hawks	43	39	.524	6.0	23‍–‍18	20‍–‍21	6–10	82
Miami Heat	41	41	.500	8.0	23‍–‍18	18‍–‍23	9–7	82
Charlotte Hornets	36	46	.439	13.0	22‍–‍19	14‍–‍27	10–6	82
Orlando Magic	29	53	.354	20.0	16‍–‍25	13‍–‍28	7–9	82

=== Conference ===
Eastern Conference
#	Team	W	L	PCT	GB	GP
1	c – Boston Celtics *	53	29	.646	–	82
2	y – Cleveland Cavaliers *	51	31	.622	2.0	82
3	x – Toronto Raptors	51	31	.622	2.0	82
4	y – Washington Wizards *	49	33	.598	4.0	82
5	x – Atlanta Hawks	43	39	.524	10.0	82
6	x – Milwaukee Bucks	42	40	.512	11.0	82
7	x – Indiana Pacers	42	40	.512	11.0	82
8	x – Chicago Bulls	41	41	.500	12.0	82
9	Miami Heat	41	41	.500	12.0	82
10	Detroit Pistons	37	45	.451	16.0	82
11	Charlotte Hornets	36	46	.439	17.0	82
12	New York Knicks	31	51	.378	22.0	82
13	Orlando Magic	29	53	.354	24.0	82
14	Philadelphia 76ers	28	54	.341	25.0	82
15	Brooklyn Nets	20	62	.244	33.0	82

== Game log ==
=== Preseason ===
2016 pre-season game log
Total: 4–4 (Home: 2–3; Road: 2–1)
Pre-season: 4–4 (home: 2–3; road: 2–1)

Game	Date	Team	Score	High points	High rebounds	High assists	Location Attendance	Record
1	October 4	@ Wizards	W 106–95	Hassan Whiteside (20)	Hassan Whiteside (13)	Dion Waiters (8)	Verizon Center; 9,100	1–0
2	October 8	Timberwolves	L 100–109	Hassan Whiteside (17)	Hassan Whiteside (12)	Dion Waiters (6)	Sprint Center; 13,042	1–1
3	October 11	Nets	W 121–100	Hassan Whiteside (21)	Hassan Whiteside (14)	Goran Dragic (11)	American Airlines Arena; 19,600	2–1
4	October 14	@ Spurs	W 108–100	Tyler Johnson (17)	Hassan Whiteside (9)	Goran Dragic (6)	AT&T Center; 18,418	3–1
5	October 15	Timberwolves	L 96–101	Rodney McGruder (15)	Willie Reed (13)	Brianté Weber (6)	KFC Yum! Center; 9,672	3–2
6	October 18	Magic	W 107–77	Goran Dragic (17)	Willie Reed (11)	Goran Dragic (5)	American Airlines Arena; 19,600	4–2
7	October 20	@ Hornets	L 88–96	Rodney McGruder (19)	Okaro White (12)	Brianté Weber (7)	Spectrum Center; 9,127	4–3
8	October 21	76ers	L 110–113	Goran Dragic (17)	Hassan Whiteside (8)	Goran Dragic (7)	American Airlines Arena; 19,600	4–4

2016–17 season schedule

=== Regular season ===
2016–17 game log
Total: 41–41 (Home: 23–18; Road: 18–23)
October: 1–2 (home: 0–2; road: 1–0)

Game	Date	Team	Score	High points	High rebounds	High assists	Location Attendance	Record
1	October 26	@ Orlando	W 108–96	Hassan Whiteside (18)	Hassan Whiteside (14)	Goran Dragic (6)	Amway Center; 19,298	1–0
2	October 28	Charlotte	L 91–97	Hassan Whiteside (20)	Hassan Whiteside (15)	Goran Dragic (9)	American Airlines Arena; 4,538	1–1
3	October 30	San Antonio	L 99–106	Hassan Whiteside (27)	Hassan Whiteside (15)	Goran Dragic (5)	American Airlines Arena; 4,567	1–2

November : 5–10 (home: 2–5; road: 3–5)

Game	Date	Team	Score	High points	High rebounds	High assists	Location Attendance	Record
4	November 1	Sacramento	W 108–96 (OT)	Goran Dragic (25)	Hassan Whiteside (11)	Goran Dragic (8)	American Airlines Arena; 19,612	2–2
5	November 4	@ Toronto	L 87–96	Hassan Whiteside (21)	Hassan Whiteside (11)	Goran Dragic (8)	Air Canada Centre; 19,800	2–3
6	November 7	@ Oklahoma City	L 85–97	James Johnson (18)	Hassan Whiteside (10)	Waiters, Dragic (4)	Chesapeake Energy Arena; 18,203	2–4
7	November 10	Chicago	L 95–98	Hassan Whiteside (20)	Hassan Whiteside (20)	Waiters, Winslow (6)	American Airlines Arena; 19,600	2–5
8	November 12	Utah	L 91–102	Whiteside, J. Johnson (15)	Hassan Whiteside (14)	J. Johnson, Richardson, T. Johnson (4)	American Airlines Arena; 19,600	2–6
9	November 14	@ San Antonio	L 90–94	Dion Waiters (27)	Hassan Whiteside (17)	Tyler Johnson (6)	AT&T Center; 18,418	2–7
10	November 15	Atlanta	L 90–93	Whiteside, Richardson (19)	Hassan Whiteside (25)	Rodney McGruder (3)	American Airlines Arena; 19,600	2–8
11	November 17	Milwaukee	W 96–73	Dion Waiters (23)	Hassan Whiteside (17)	Tyler Johnson (5)	American Airlines Arena; 19,600	3–8
12	November 19	@ Washington	W 114–111	Goran Dragic (22)	Hassan Whiteside (18)	Dion Waiters (8)	Verizon Center; 15,848	4–8
13	November 21	@ Philadelphia	L 94–101	Hassan Whiteside (32)	Hassan Whiteside (13)	Goran Dragic (7)	Wells Fargo Center; 16,477	4–9
14	November 23	@ Detroit	L 84–107	Tyler Johnson (17)	Hassan Whiteside (8)	Tyler Johnson (7)	Palace of Auburn Hills; 14,520	4–10
15	November 25	@ Memphis	W 90–81	Tyler Johnson (22)	Hassan Whiteside (12)	Waiters, Richardson (4)	FedExForum; 17,222	5–10
16	November 26	Memphis	L 107–110	Dion Waiters (25)	Hassan Whiteside (12)	Dion Waiters (6)	American Airlines Arena; 19,600	5–11
17	November 28	Boston	L 104–112	Goran Dragic (27)	Hassan Whiteside (16)	Goran Dragic (17)	American Airlines Arena; 19,600	5–12
18	November 30	@ Denver	W 106–98	Hassan Whiteside (25)	Hassan Whiteside (16)	Dragic, T. Johnson (7)	Pepsi Center; 11,471	6–12

December : 4–12 (home: 3–5; road: 1–7)

Game	Date	Team	Score	High points	High rebounds	High assists	Location Attendance	Record
19	December 1	@ Utah	W 111–110	Goran Dragic (27)	Hassan Whiteside (10)	Goran Dragic (6)	Vivint Smart Home Arena; 19,073	7–12
20	December 3	@ Portland	L 92–99	Goran Dragic (28)	Hassan Whiteside (16)	Goran Dragic (8)	Moda Center; 19,393	7–13
21	December 6	New York	L 103–114	Goran Dragic (29)	Hassan Whiteside (14)	Goran Dragic (7)	American Airlines Arena; 19,610	7–14
22	December 7	@ Atlanta	L 95–103	Tyler Johnson (27)	Hassan Whiteside (12)	McGruder, T. Johnson (5)	Philips Arena; 11,326	7–15
23	December 9	@ Cleveland	L 84–114	Derrick Williams (17)	Hassan Whiteside (12)	McGruder, Dragic, McRoberts (4)	Quicken Loans Arena; 20,562	7–16
24	December 10	@ Chicago	L 100–105	Goran Dragic (21)	Williams, Whiteside (8)	Goran Dragic (7)	United Center; 21,450	7–17
25	December 12	Washington	W 112–101	Goran Dragic (34)	Hassan Whiteside (16)	Dragic, Ellington (5)	American Airlines Arena; 19,600	8–17
26	December 14	Indiana	W 95–89	Hassan Whiteside (26)	Hassan Whiteside (22)	Goran Dragic (7)	American Airlines Arena; 19,600	9–17
27	December 16	LA Clippers	L 98–102	Goran Dragic (21)	Hassan Whiteside (17)	Goran Dragic (11)	American Airlines Arena; 19,600	9–18
28	December 18	Boston	L 95–105	Goran Dragic (31)	Hassan Whiteside (17)	Goran Dragic (7)	American Airlines Arena; 19,600	9–19
29	December 20	Orlando	L 130–136 (2OT)	T. Johnson, Whiteside (32)	Hassan Whiteside (15)	J. Johnson, Richardson (6)	American Airlines Arena; 19,600	9–20
30	December 22	L. A. Lakers	W 115–107	Whiteside, Winslow (23)	Whiteside, Winslow (13)	Goran Dragic (7)	American Airlines Arena; 19,712	10–20
31	December 23	@ New Orleans	L 87–91	Goran Dragic (23)	Hassan Whiteside (18)	Goran Dragic (5)	Smoothie King Center; 16,322	10–21
32	December 27	Oklahoma City	L 94–106	Josh Richardson (22)	Hassan Whiteside (8)	Justise Winslow (5)	American Airlines Arena; 19,977	10–22
33	December 29	@ Charlotte	L 82–91	Josh Richardson (20)	Hassan Whiteside (10)	Goran Dragic (8)	Spectrum Center; 19,471	10–23
34	December 30	@ Boston	L 114–117	James Johnson (22)	Justise Winslow (9)	Josh Richardson (8)	TD Garden; 18,624	10–24

January : 9–6 (home: 6–1; road: 3–5)

Game	Date	Team	Score	High points	High rebounds	High assists	Location Attendance	Record
35	January 1	Detroit	L 98–107	James Johnson (20)	James Johnson (7)	Josh Richardson (8)	American Airlines Arena; 19,844	10–25
36	January 3	@ Phoenix	L 90–99	Goran Dragic (24)	Hassan Whiteside (18)	Goran Dragic (9)	Talking Stick Resort Arena; 16,772	10–26
37	January 4	@ Sacramento	W 107–102	Tyler Johnson (23)	Josh Richardson (8)	Goran Dragic (7)	Golden 1 Center; 17,608	11–26
38	January 6	@ L. A. Lakers	L 100–127	Willie Reed (22)	Willie Reed (12)	Goran Dragic (3)	Staples Center; 18,997	11–27
39	January 8	@ L. A. Clippers	L 86–98	Goran Dragic (24)	Hassan Whiteside (13)	Goran Dragic (5)	Staples Center; 19,060	11–28
40	January 10	@ Golden State	L 95–107	Hassan Whiteside (28)	Hassan Whiteside (20)	Dion Waiters (8)	Oracle Arena; 19,596	11−29
41	January 13	@ Milwaukee	L 108–116	Dragic, Whiteside (19)	Hassan Whiteside (9)	Dion Waiters (6)	BMO Harris Bradley Center; 17,483	11–30
42	January 17	Houston	W 109–103	Goran Dragic (21)	Hassan Whiteside (15)	Goran Dragic (8)	American Airlines Arena; 19,600	12–30
43	January 19	Dallas	W 99–95	Goran Dragic (30)	J. Johnson, Whiteside (8)	James Johnson (4)	American Airlines Arena; 19,600	13–30
44	January 21	Milwaukee	W 109–97	Dion Waiters (33)	Hassan Whiteside (15)	J. Johnson, Dragic (6)	American Airlines Arena; 19,600	14–30
45	January 23	Golden State	W 105–102	Dion Waiters (33)	Hassan Whiteside (15)	Goran Dragic (5)	American Airlines Arena; 19,600	15–30
46	January 25	@ Brooklyn	W 109–106	Dion Waiters (24)	Goran Dragic (9)	Goran Dragic (9)	Barclays Center; 14,929	16–30
47	January 27	@ Chicago	W 100–88	Goran Dragic (26)	James Johnson (9)	Goran Dragic (11)	United Center; 22,082	17–30
48	January 28	Detroit	W 116–103	Goran Dragic (23)	Hassan Whiteside (12)	Dion Waiters (7)	American Airlines Arena; 19,600	18–30
49	January 30	Brooklyn	W 104–96	Goran Dragic (20)	Hassan Whiteside (9)	Dion Waiters (9)	American Airlines Arena; 19,600	19–30

February : 8–3 (home: 3–1; road: 5–2)

Game	Date	Team	Score	High points	High rebounds	High assists	Location Attendance	Record
50	February 1	Atlanta	W 116–93	Goran Dragic (27)	Hassan Whiteside (18)	Goran Dragic (5)	AmericanAirlines Arena; 19,600	20–30
51	February 4	Philadelphia	W 125–102	Hassan Whiteside (30)	Hassan Whiteside (20)	Goran Dragic (8)	AmericanAirlines Arena; 19,754	21–30
52	February 6	@ Minnesota	W 115–113	Goran Dragic (33)	Hassan Whiteside (13)	Goran Dragic (9)	Target Center; 12,502	22–30
53	February 8	@ Milwaukee	W 106–88	Hassan Whiteside (23)	Hassan Whiteside (16)	Goran Dragic (7)	Bradley Center; 14,211	23–30
54	February 10	@ Brooklyn	W 108–99	Goran Dragic (21)	Hassan Whiteside (9)	Goran Dragic (5)	Barclays Center; 15,382	24–30
55	February 11	@ Philadelphia	L 109–117	Goran Dragic (30)	Hassan Whiteside (19)	Tyler Johnson (5)	Wells Fargo Center; 20,698	24–31
56	February 13	Orlando	L 107–116	Dion Waiters (23)	Hassan Whiteside (19)	Dion Waiters (6)	AmericanAirlines Arena; 19,600	24–32
57	February 15	@ Houston	W 117–109	Whiteside, Waiters (23)	Hassan Whiteside (14)	Dion Waiters (7)	Toyota Center; 16,967	25–32
58	February 24	@ Atlanta	W 108–90	Tyler Johnson (23)	Hassan Whiteside (10)	Dion Waiters (10)	Philips Arena; 18,122	26–32
59	February 25	Indiana	W 113–95	Whiteside, Waiters (22)	Hassan Whiteside (17)	James Johnson (8)	AmericanAirlines Arena; 19,600	27–32
60	February 27	@ Dallas	L 89–96	Goran Dragic (24)	Hassan Whiteside (19)	Dragic, Waiters (6)	American Airlines Center; 19,539	27–33

March : 10–6 (home: 7–3; road: 3–3)

Game	Date	Team	Score	High points	High rebounds	High assists	Location Attendance	Record
61	March 1	Philadelphia	W 125–98	Tyler Johnson (24)	Hassan Whiteside (11)	Josh Richardson (5)	American Airlines Center; 19,609	28–33
62	March 3	@ Orlando	L 99–110	James Johnson (19)	Hassan Whiteside (18)	James Johnson (6)	Amway Center; 17,136	28–34
63	March 4	Cleveland	W 120–92	Goran Dragic (23)	Hassan Whiteside (13)	Goran Dragic (5)	AmericanAirlines Arena; 19,600	29–34
64	March 6	@ Cleveland	W 106–98	Dion Waiters (29)	Hassan Whiteside (11)	Goran Dragic (6)	Quicken Loans Arena; 20,562	30–34
65	March 8	Charlotte	W 108–101	Dion Waiters (24)	Hassan Whiteside (15)	Goran Dragic (10)	American Airlines Arena; 19,600	31–34
66	March 11	Toronto	W 104–89	Dion Waiters (20)	Hassan Whiteside (14)	Dion Waiters (5)	American Airlines Arena; 19,745	32–34
67	March 12	@ Indiana	L 98–102	Hassan Whiteside (26)	Hassan Whiteside (21)	Dion Waiters (6)	Bankers Life Fieldhouse; 17,923	32–35
68	March 15	New Orleans	W 120–112	Goran Dragic (33)	Hassan Whiteside (17)	Tyler Johnson (9)	American Airlines Arena; 19,678	33–35
69	March 17	Minnesota	W 123–105	Whiteside, Johnson (23)	Hassan Whiteside (14)	Goran Dragic (10)	American Airlines Arena; 19,600	34–35
70	March 19	Portland	L 104–115	James Johnson (24)	Hassan Whiteside (10)	James Johnson (5)	American Airlines Arena; 19,600	34–36
71	March 21	Phoenix	W 112–97	Hassan Whiteside (23)	Hassan Whiteside (14)	Dragic, Johnson (4)	American Airlines Arena; 19,600	35–36
72	March 23	Toronto	L 84–101	Hassan Whiteside (16)	Hassan Whiteside (14)	Goran Dragic (7)	American Airlines Arena; 19,745	35–37
73	March 26	@ Boston	L 108–112	Tyler Johnson (24)	Hassan Whiteside (15)	James Johnson (6)	TD Garden; 18,624	35–38
74	March 28	@ Detroit	W 97–96	Goran Dragic (28)	Hassan Whiteside (9)	Dragic, McGruder, Richardson (4)	The Palace of Auburn Hills; 17,160	36–38
75	March 29	@ New York	W 105–88	Goran Dragic (20)	Hassan Whiteside (9)	Goran Dragic (9)	Madison Square Garden; 19,812	37–38
76	March 31	New York	L 94–98	Goran Dragic (22)	Hassan Whiteside (16)	Dragic, Richardson (5)	AmericanAirlines Arena; 19,600	37–39

April : 5–2 (home: 3–1; road: 2–1)

Game	Date	Team	Score	High points	High rebounds	High assists	Location Attendance	Record
77	April 2	Denver	L 113–116	Goran Dragic (22)	Hassan Whiteside (12)	Dragic, Johnson (6)	AmericanAirlines Arena; 19,600	37–40
78	April 5	@ Charlotte	W 112–99	Goran Dragic (33)	Hassan Whiteside (20)	Josh Richardson (5)	Spectrum Center; 17,758	38–40
79	April 7	@ Toronto	L 94–96	James Johnson (22)	Whiteside, Johnson (10)	Josh Richardson (4)	Air Canada Centre; 19,800	38–41
80	April 8	@ Washington	W 106–103	Hassan Whiteside (30)	Hassan Whiteside (12)	Goran Dragic (7)	Verizon Center; 20,365	39–41
81	April 10	Cleveland	W 124–121 (OT)	Tyler Johnson (24)	Hassan Whiteside (18)	James Johnson (9)	AmericanAirlines Arena; 19,673	40–41
82	April 12	Washington	W 110–102	Goran Dragic (28)	Hassan Whiteside (18)	James Johnson (8)	AmericanAirlines Arena; 19,600	41–41

2016–17 season schedule

== Player statistics ==
=== Regular season ===
Player	POS	GP	GS	MP	REB	AST	STL	BLK	PTS	MPG	RPG	APG	SPG	BPG	PPG
Rodney McGruder	SG	78	65	1,966	256	124	46	18	497	25.2	3.3	1.6	.6	.2	6.4
Hassan Whiteside	C	77	77	2,513	1,088	57	57	161	1,309	32.6	14.1	.7	.7	2.1	17.0
James Johnson	PF	76	5	2,085	376	276	76	86	975	27.4	4.9	3.6	1.0	1.1	12.8
Goran Dragić	PG	73	73	2,459	279	423	89	13	1,483	33.7	3.8	5.8	1.2	.2	20.3
Tyler Johnson	PG	73	0	2,178	293	233	84	44	1,002	29.8	4.0	3.2	1.2	.6	13.7
Willie Reed	C	71	5	1,031	332	26	18	47	374	14.5	4.7	.4	.3	.7	5.3
Luke Babbitt	SF	68	55	1,065	141	36	20	11	324	15.7	2.1	.5	.3	.2	4.8
Wayne Ellington	SG	62	13	1,500	132	70	35	4	648	24.2	2.1	1.1	.6	.1	10.5
Josh Richardson	SG	53	34	1,614	168	140	60	39	539	30.5	3.2	2.6	1.1	.7	10.2
Dion Waiters	SG	46	43	1,384	153	200	42	20	729	30.1	3.3	4.3	.9	.4	15.8
Okaro White	PF	35	0	471	82	21	10	10	98	13.5	2.3	.6	.3	.3	2.8
Derrick Williams^{†}	PF	25	11	377	73	14	9	5	148	15.1	2.9	.6	.4	.2	5.9
Josh McRoberts	PF	22	14	381	74	50	10	4	107	17.3	3.4	2.3	.5	.2	4.9
Justise Winslow	SF	18	15	625	94	66	26	6	196	34.7	5.2	3.7	1.4	.3	10.9
Udonis Haslem	C	16	0	130	36	6	6	1	31	8.1	2.3	.4	.4	.1	1.9

- ^{†} Denotes player spent time with another team in the season. Stats reflect time with the Heat only.
