= 2016–17 Orlando Magic season =

NBA professional basketball team season

- Head coach: Frank Vogel
- General manager: Rob Hennigan
- Owners: RDV Sports, Inc.
- Arena: Amway Center

Results
- Record: 29–53 (.354)
- Place: Division: 5th (Southeast); Conference: 13th (Eastern)
- Playoff finish: Did not qualify
- Stats at Basketball Reference

Local media
- Television: Fox Sports Florida, Sun Sports
- Radio: WDBO

The 2016–17 Orlando Magic season was the 28th season of the franchise in the National Basketball Association (NBA).

== Key dates ==
- May 12, 2016: Scott Skiles stepped down as head coach of the Magic.
- May 20, 2016: The Magic hired Frank Vogel to become their new head coach.
- June 24, 2016: The 2016 NBA draft takes place at the Barclays Center in Brooklyn, New York; Orlando trades their top selection (Domantas Sabonis), Victor Oladipo, and Ersan İlyasova to the Oklahoma City Thunder in exchange for their defensive-oriented (star) center, Serge Ibaka.
- February 14, 2017: Serge Ibaka gets traded to the Toronto Raptors in exchange for Terrance Ross and the Raptors' 2017 draft pick.
- April 13, 2017: Rob Hennigan is fired as general manager, despite having a year remaining on his contract.

== Draft picks ==
Round	Pick	Player	Position	Nationality	College
2	41	Stephen Zimmerman	PF / C	United States	UNLV
2	47	Jake Layman	SF	United States	Maryland

== Roster ==
2016–17 Orlando Magic roster
Players

Pos.	No.	Player	Height	Weight	DOB	From
G	14	D. J. Augustin	6 ft 0 in (1.83 m)	183 lb (83 kg)	1987-11-10	Texas
C	11	Bismack Biyombo	6 ft 9 in (2.06 m)	255 lb (116 kg)	1992-08-28	DR Congo
G	10	Evan Fournier	6 ft 7 in (2.01 m)	205 lb (93 kg)	1992-10-29	France
G	29	Patricio Garino	6 ft 6 in (1.98 m)	203 lb (92 kg)	1993-05-17	George Washington
F	13	Marcus Georges-Hunt	6 ft 6 in (1.98 m)	220 lb (100 kg)	1994-03-28	Georgia Tech
F	00	Aaron Gordon	6 ft 9 in (2.06 m)	220 lb (100 kg)	1995-09-16	Arizona
F	34	Jeff Green	6 ft 9 in (2.06 m)	235 lb (107 kg)	1986-08-28	Georgetown
G	8	Mario Hezonja	6 ft 8 in (2.03 m)	218 lb (99 kg)	1995-02-25	Croatia
G	20	Jodie Meeks	6 ft 4 in (1.93 m)	210 lb (95 kg)	1987-08-21	Kentucky
G	4	Elfrid Payton	6 ft 4 in (1.93 m)	185 lb (84 kg)	1994-02-22	Louisiana
G	31	Terrence Ross	6 ft 7 in (2.01 m)	195 lb (88 kg)	1991-02-05	Washington
F	3	Damjan Rudež	6 ft 10 in (2.08 m)	228 lb (103 kg)	1986-06-17	Croatia
C	9	Nikola Vučević	7 ft 0 in (2.13 m)	260 lb (118 kg)	1990-10-24	USC
G	32	C. J. Watson	6 ft 2 in (1.88 m)	175 lb (79 kg)	1984-04-17	Tennessee
C	33	Stephen Zimmerman	7 ft 0 in (2.13 m)	240 lb (109 kg)	1996-09-09	UNLV

Coaches
Head coach
- Frank Vogel
Assistant(s)
- Chad Forcier
- Corliss Williamson
- David Adelman
- Jay Hernandez (player development)

Legend
- (DP) Unsigned draft pick
- (FA) Free agent
- (S) Suspended
- (DL) On assignment to D-League affiliate
- Injured

Roster
Updated: April 3, 2017

== Standings ==
=== Division ===
Southeast Division	W	L	PCT	GB	Home	Road	Div	GP
y – Washington Wizards	49	33	.598	–	30‍–‍11	19‍–‍22	8–8	82
x – Atlanta Hawks	43	39	.524	6.0	23‍–‍18	20‍–‍21	6–10	82
Miami Heat	41	41	.500	8.0	23‍–‍18	18‍–‍23	9–7	82
Charlotte Hornets	36	46	.439	13.0	22‍–‍19	14‍–‍27	10–6	82
Orlando Magic	29	53	.354	20.0	16‍–‍25	13‍–‍28	7–9	82

=== Conference ===
Eastern Conference
#	Team	W	L	PCT	GB	GP
1	c – Boston Celtics *	53	29	.646	–	82
2	y – Cleveland Cavaliers *	51	31	.622	2.0	82
3	x – Toronto Raptors	51	31	.622	2.0	82
4	y – Washington Wizards *	49	33	.598	4.0	82
5	x – Atlanta Hawks	43	39	.524	10.0	82
6	x – Milwaukee Bucks	42	40	.512	11.0	82
7	x – Indiana Pacers	42	40	.512	11.0	82
8	x – Chicago Bulls	41	41	.500	12.0	82
9	Miami Heat	41	41	.500	12.0	82
10	Detroit Pistons	37	45	.451	16.0	82
11	Charlotte Hornets	36	46	.439	17.0	82
12	New York Knicks	31	51	.378	22.0	82
13	Orlando Magic	29	53	.354	24.0	82
14	Philadelphia 76ers	28	54	.341	25.0	82
15	Brooklyn Nets	20	62	.244	33.0	82

== Game log ==
=== Pre-season ===
2016 pre-season game log
Total: 2–5 (Home: 2–2; Road: 0–3)
Pre-season: 2–5 (home: 2–2; road: 0–3)

Game	Date	Team	Score	High points	High rebounds	High assists	Location Attendance	Record
1	October 3	@ Memphis	L 97–102	Evan Fournier (18)	Bismack Biyombo (10)	Nikola Vučević (5)	FedExForum; 18,119	0–1
2	October 5	@ Cleveland	L 102–117	Jeff Green (19)	Biyombo, Johnson, Vučević (5)	Nick Johnson (5)	Quicken Loans Arena; 18,789	0–2
3	October 12	San Antonio	L 89–95	Evan Fournier (20)	Bismack Biyombo (11)	Biyombo, Hezonja, Watson (3)	Amway Center; 15,092	0–3
4	October 14	Indiana	W 114–106	Serge Ibaka (19)	Serge Ibaka (17)	C. J. Watson (10)	Amway Center; 14,097	1–3
5	October 16	Atlanta	L 98–105	Serge Ibaka (25)	Bismack Biyombo (19)	Elfrid Payton (5)	Amway Center; 15,081	1–4
6	October 18	@ Miami	L 77–107	Serge Ibaka (15)	Serge Ibaka (9)	Elfrid Payton (4)	American Airlines Arena; 19,600	1–5
7	October 20	New Orleans	W 114–111 (OT)	Evan Fournier (24)	Nikola Vučević (12)	Elfrid Payton (12)	Amway Center; 14,901	2–5

2016–17 season schedule

=== Regular season ===
2016–17 game log
Total: 29–53 (Home: 16–25; Road: 13–28)
October: 0–3 (home: 0–1; road: 0–2)

Game	Date	Team	Score	High points	High rebounds	High assists	Location Attendance	Record
1	October 26	Miami	L 96–108	Evan Fournier (20)	Nikola Vučević (14)	Elfrid Payton (5)	Amway Center; 19,298	0–1
2	October 28	@ Detroit	L 82–108	Aaron Gordon (17)	Nikola Vučević (14)	Elfrid Payton (6)	The Palace of Auburn Hills; 19,122	0–2
3	October 29	@ Cleveland	L 99–105	Evan Fournier (22)	Jeff Green (10)	Fournier, Payton (5)	Quicken Loans Arena; 20,562	0–3

November : 7–8 (home: 4–5; road: 3–3)

Game	Date	Team	Score	High points	High rebounds	High assists	Location Attendance	Record
4	November 1	@ Philadelphia	W 103–101	Nikola Vučević (24)	Nikola Vučević (14)	Elfrid Payton (10)	Wells Fargo Center; 12,529	1–3
5	November 3	Sacramento	W 102–94	Evan Fournier (29)	Aaron Gordon (10)	Elfrid Payton (11)	Amway Center; 17,026	2–3
6	November 5	Washington	W 88–86	Jeff Green (18)	Bismack Biyombo (12)	D. J. Augustin (5)	Amway Center; 18,846	3–3
7	November 7	@ Chicago	L 80–112	Aaron Gordon (15)	Biyombo, Ibaka (7)	Elfrid Payton (6)	United Center; 21,320	3–4
8	November 9	Minnesota	L 107–123	Nikola Vučević (24)	Nikola Vučević (14)	Elfrid Payton (7)	Amway Center; 17,102	3–5
9	November 11	Utah	L 74–87	Evan Fournier (21)	Serge Ibaka (9)	Evan Fournier (4)	Amway Center; 18,846	3–6
10	November 13	@ Oklahoma City	W 119–117	Serge Ibaka (31)	Serge Ibaka (9)	Elfrid Payton (9)	Chesapeake Energy Arena; 18,203	4–6
11	November 14	@ Indiana	L 69–88	Evan Fournier (14)	Serge Ibaka (13)	Ibaka, Payton, Fournier (2)	Bankers Life Fieldhouse; 14,825	4–7
12	November 16	New Orleans	W 89–82	Fournier, Ibaka (16)	Nikola Vučević (14)	Elfrid Payton (4)	Amway Center; 16,127	5–7
13	November 19	Dallas	W 95–87	D. J. Augustin (18)	Nikola Vučević (12)	D. J. Augustin (6)	Amway Center; 18,846	6–7
14	November 21	@ Milwaukee	L 89–93	Serge Ibaka (21)	Nikola Vučević (11)	Elfrid Payton (7)	BMO Harris Bradley Center; 12,306	6–8
15	November 23	Phoenix	L 87–92	Evan Fournier (25)	Nikola Vučević (13)	Elfrid Payton (7)	Amway Center; 17,069	6–9
16	November 25	Washington	L 91–94	Serge Ibaka (19)	Nikola Vučević (17)	Elfrid Payton (5)	Amway Center; 17,103	6–10
17	November 27	Milwaukee	L 96–104	Evan Fournier (27)	Nikola Vučević (16)	Evan Fournier (7)	Amway Center; 16,521	6–11
18	November 29	@ San Antonio	W 95–83	Serge Ibaka (18)	Nikola Vučević (10)	Evan Fournier (7)	AT&T Center; 18,418	7–11

December : 8–8 (home: 3–5; road: 5–3)

Game	Date	Team	Score	High points	High rebounds	High assists	Location Attendance	Record
19	December 1	@ Memphis	L 94–95	Evan Fournier (28)	Bismack Biyombo (14)	Elfrid Payton (5)	FedExForum; 13,344	7–12
20	December 2	@ Philadelphia	W 105–88	Aaron Gordon (20)	Bismack Biyombo (13)	Nikola Vučević (5)	Wells Fargo Center; 13,711	8–12
21	December 4	@ Detroit	W 98–92	Serge Ibaka (21)	Nikola Vučević (8)	Biyombo, Ibaka (4)	The Palace of Auburn Hills; 15,206	9–12
22	December 6	@ Washington	W 124–116	Elfrid Payton (25)	Bismack Biyombo (13)	Elfrid Payton (9)	Verizon Center; 12,116	10–12
23	December 7	Boston	L 87–117	D. J. Augustin (17)	Nikola Vučević (10)	Evan Fournier (5)	Amway Center; 17,009	10–13
24	December 9	@ Charlotte	L 88–109	Evan Fournier (14)	Serge Ibaka (7)	Elfrid Payton (6)	Time Warner Cable Arena; 15,707	10–14
25	December 10	Denver	L 113–121	Evan Fournier (24)	Biyombo, Gordon (6)	D. J. Augustin (7)	Amway Center; 17,010	10–15
26	December 13	@ Atlanta	W 131–120	Serge Ibaka (29)	Bismack Biyombo (9)	Elfrid Payton (14)	Philips Arena; 17,789	11–15
27	December 14	L.A. Clippers	L 108–113	Aaron Gordon (33)	Bismack Biyombo (12)	Elfrid Payton (9)	Amway Center; 18,846	11–16
28	December 16	Brooklyn	W 118–111	Fournier, Vučević (21)	Ibaka, Vučević (10)	Elfrid Payton (5)	Amway Center; 17,668	12–16
29	December 18	Toronto	L 79–109	Evan Fournier (15)	Bismack Biyombo (12)	Fournier, Payton (3)	Amway Center; 17,251	12–17
30	December 20	@ Miami	W 136–130 (2OT)	Fournier, Vučević (26)	Nikola Vučević (12)	Augustin, Payton (6)	American Airlines Arena; 19,600	13–17
31	December 22	@ New York	L 95–106	Serge Ibaka (23)	Serge Ibaka (10)	Nikola Vučević (6)	Madison Square Garden; 19,812	13–18
32	December 23	L.A. Lakers	W 109–90	Elfrid Payton (25)	Serge Ibaka (11)	Elfrid Payton (9)	Amway Center; 18,846	14–18
33	December 26	Memphis	W 112–102	Aaron Gordon (30)	Bismack Biyombo (12)	Augustin, Payton (7)	Amway Center; 17,104	15–18
34	December 28	Charlotte	L 101–120	Nikola Vučević (21)	Serge Ibaka (7)	Payton, Vučević, Watson (4)	Amway Center; 18,273	15–19

January : 4–12 (home: 1–4; road: 3–8)

Game	Date	Team	Score	High points	High rebounds	High assists	Location Attendance	Record
35	January 1	@ Indiana	L 104–117	Nikola Vučević (18)	Nikola Vučević (11)	Elfrid Payton (7)	Bankers Life Fieldhouse; 17,530	15–20
36	January 2	@ New York	W 115–103	Jodie Meeks (23)	Nikola Vučević (13)	Elfrid Payton (14)	Madison Square Garden; 19,812	16–20
37	January 4	Atlanta	L 92–111	Gordon, Payton (15)	Serge Ibaka (11)	Payton, Vučević (6)	Amway Center; 18,846	16–21
38	January 6	Houston	L 93–100	D. J. Augustin (19)	Ibaka, Vučević (12)	Aaron Gordon (7)	Amway Center; 19,272	16–22
39	January 8	@ L.A. Lakers	L 95–112	Fournier, Ibaka, Vučević (19)	Bismack Biyombo (11)	D. J. Augustin (8)	Staples Center; 18,997	16–23
40	January 11	@ L.A. Clippers	L 96–105	Aaron Gordon (28)	Nikola Vučević (12)	Nikola Vučević (4)	Staples Center; 19,060	16–24
41	January 13	@ Portland	W 115–109	Nikola Vučević (30)	Ibaka, Vučević (10)	Elfrid Payton (7)	Moda Center; 19,344	17–24
42	January 14	@ Utah	L 107–114	Elfrid Payton (28)	Elfrid Payton (9)	Elfrid Payton (9)	Vivint Smart Home Arena; 19,911	17–25
43	January 16	@ Denver	L 112–125	Elfrid Payton (20)	Bismack Biyombo (9)	Elfrid Payton (12)	Pepsi Center; 11,217	17–26
44	January 18	@ New Orleans	L 98–118	Gordon, Payton (14)	Gordon, Vučević (8)	Nikola Vučević (5)	Smoothie King Center; 15,818	17–27
45	January 20	Milwaukee	W 112–96	Elfrid Payton (20)	Bismack Biyombo (13)	D. J. Augustin (8)	Amway Center; 19,307	18–27
46	January 22	Golden State	L 98–118	Elfrid Payton (23)	Bismack Biyombo (14)	Elfrid Payton (10)	Amway Center; 18,846	18–28
47	January 24	Chicago	L 92–100	Nikola Vučević (20)	Ibaka, Vučević (8)	C.J. Watson (6)	Amway Center; 18,846	18–29
48	January 27	@ Boston	L 98–128	Rudež, Vučević (14)	Biyombo, Vučević (7)	Elfrid Payton (7)	TD Garden; 18,624	18–30
49	January 29	@ Toronto	W 114–113	Nikola Vučević (25)	Nikola Vučević (10)	Elfrid Payton (10)	Air Canada Centre; 19,800	19–30
50	January 30	@ Minnesota	L 105–111 (OT)	Elfrid Payton (21)	Nikola Vučević (15)	Nikola Vučević (5)	Target Center; 11,124	19–31

February : 3–7 (home: 2–4; road: 1–3)

Game	Date	Team	Score	High points	High rebounds	High assists	Location Attendance	Record
51	February 1	Indiana	L 88–98	Serge Ibaka (20)	Nikola Vučević (15)	Nikola Vučević (5)	Amway Center; 16,662	19–32
52	February 3	Toronto	W 102–94	Fournier, Ibaka (20)	Serge Ibaka (12)	Elfrid Payton (6)	Amway Center; 17,141	20–32
53	February 4	@ Atlanta	L 86–113	Aaron Gordon (16)	Nikola Vučević (7)	Fournier, Augustin, Gordon, Watson (3)	Philips Arena; 16,691	20–33
54	February 7	@ Houston	L 104–128	Serge Ibaka (28)	Nikola Vučević (19)	Elfrid Payton (8)	Toyota Center; 15,514	20–34
55	February 9	Philadelphia	L 111–112	Evan Fournier (24)	Nikola Vučević (11)	Evan Fournier (8)	Amway Center; 17,829	20–35
56	February 11	@ Dallas	L 80–112	Bismack Biyombo (15)	Nikola Vučević (10)	C.J. Watson (5)	American Airlines Center; 20,052	20–36
57	February 13	@ Miami	W 116–107	Evan Fournier (24)	Nikola Vučević (17)	Fournier, Payton (4)	American Airlines Arena; 19,600	21–36
58	February 15	San Antonio	L 79–107	Nikola Vučević (16)	Nikola Vučević (10)	Evan Fournier (5)	Amway Center; 17,101	21–37
All-Star Break
59	February 23	Portland	L 103–112	Evan Fournier (20)	Gordon, Vučević (9)	Jeff Green (4)	Amway Center; 17,487	21–38
60	February 25	Atlanta	W 105–86	Terrence Ross (24)	Nikola Vučević (14)	Elfrid Payton (9)	Amway Center; 18,498	22–38

March : 5–11 (home: 4–5; road: 1–6)

Game	Date	Team	Score	High points	High rebounds	High assists	Location Attendance	Record
61	March 1	New York	L 90–101	Evan Fournier (22)	Nikola Vučević (10)	Elfrid Payton (4)	Amway Center; 16,005	22–39
62	March 3	Miami	W 110–99	Nikola Vučević (25)	Gordon, Payton (10)	Elfrid Payton (8)	Amway Center; 17,136	23–39
63	March 5	@ Washington	L 114–115	Terrence Ross (20)	Bismack Biyombo (15)	D. J. Augustin (4)	Verizon Center; 19,195	23–40
64	March 6	New York	L 105–113	Evan Fournier (25)	Bismack Biyombo (14)	Elfrid Payton (10)	Amway Center; 16,046	23–41
65	March 8	Chicago	W 98–91	Elfrid Payton (22)	Elfrid Payton (14)	Elfrid Payton (14)	Amway Center; 16,063	24–41
66	March 10	@ Charlotte	L 81–121	Aaron Gordon (20)	Bismack Biyombo (10)	Elfrid Payton (12)	Time Warner Cable Arena; 17,444	24–42
67	March 11	Cleveland	L 104–116	Nikola Vučević (20)	Nikola Vučević (16)	Elfrid Payton (6)	Amway Center; 18,846	24–43
68	March 13	@ Sacramento	L 115–120	Nikola Vučević (20)	Elfrid Payton (10)	Elfrid Payton (13)	Golden 1 Center; 17,608	24–44
69	March 16	@ Golden State	L 92–122	Green, Payton (13)	Bismack Biyombo (10)	Nikola Vučević (4)	Oracle Arena; 19,596	24–45
70	March 17	@ Phoenix	W 109–103	Evan Fournier (25)	Nikola Vučević (17)	Elfrid Payton (11)	Talking Stick Resort Arena; 16,880	25–45
71	March 20	Philadelphia	W 112–109 (OT)	Nikola Vučević (26)	Payton, Vučević (13)	Gordon, Payton (4)	Amway Center; 16,236	26–45
72	March 22	Charlotte	L 102–109	Terrence Ross (19)	Nikola Vučević (12)	Nikola Vučević (8)	Amway Center; 16,034	26–46
73	March 24	Detroit	W 115–87	Terrence Ross (18)	Elfrid Payton (11)	Elfrid Payton (10)	Amway Center; 18,076	27–46
74	March 27	@ Toronto	L 112–131	Elfrid Payton (22)	Nikola Vučević (15)	Elfrid Payton (9)	Air Canada Centre; 19,800	27–47
75	March 29	Oklahoma City	L 106–114 (OT)	Evan Fournier (24)	Nikola Vučević (16)	Elfrid Payton (8)	Amway Center; 18,408	27–48
76	March 31	@ Boston	L 116–117	Aaron Gordon (32)	Aaron Gordon (16)	Elfrid Payton (15)	TD Garden; 18,624	27–49

April : 2–4 (home: 2–1; road: 0–3)

Game	Date	Team	Score	High points	High rebounds	High assists	Location Attendance	Record
77	April 1	@ Brooklyn	L 111–121	Nikola Vučević (27)	Aaron Gordon (15)	Elfrid Payton (11)	Barclays Center; 15,976	27–50
78	April 4	@ Cleveland	L 102–122	Evan Fournier (21)	Biyombo, Vučević (10)	Payton, Watson (6)	Quicken Loans Arena; 20,562	27–51
79	April 6	Brooklyn	W 115–107	Elfrid Payton (22)	Nikola Vučević (12)	Elfrid Payton (11)	Amway Center; 18,095	28–51
80	April 8	Indiana	L 112–127	Terrence Ross (29)	Nikola Vučević (10)	Elfrid Payton (10)	Amway Center; 18,846	28–52
81	April 10	@ Chicago	L 75–122	Fournier, Vucevic (14)	Nikola Vučević (10)	Elfrid Payton (4)	United Center; 21,545	28–53
82	April 12	Detroit	W 113–109	Aaron Gordon (32)	Aaron Gordon (12)	Elfrid Payton (13)	Amway Center; 19,458	29–53

2016–17 season schedule

== Player statistics ==
=== Ragular season ===
Player	POS	GP	GS	MP	REB	AST	STL	BLK	PTS	MPG	RPG	APG	SPG	BPG	PPG
Elfrid Payton	PG	82	58	2,412	387	529	88	40	1,046	29.4	4.7	6.5	1.1	.5	12.8
Bismack Biyombo	C	81	27	1,793	567	74	25	91	483	22.1	7.0	.9	.3	1.1	6.0
Aaron Gordon	SF	80	72	2,298	405	150	65	40	1,019	28.7	5.1	1.9	.8	.5	12.7
D. J. Augustin	PG	78	20	1,538	117	209	31	1	616	19.7	1.5	2.7	.4	.0	7.9
Nikola Vučević	C	75	55	2,163	779	208	76	74	1,096	28.8	10.4	2.8	1.0	1.0	14.6
Jeff Green	PF	69	11	1,534	214	81	37	13	638	22.2	3.1	1.2	.5	.2	9.2
Evan Fournier	SG	68	66	2,234	209	202	66	4	1,167	32.9	3.1	3.0	1.0	.1	17.2
Mario Hezonja	SF	65	2	960	146	62	30	15	317	14.8	2.2	1.0	.5	.2	4.9
C. J. Watson	PG	62	9	1,012	89	114	43	2	281	16.3	1.4	1.8	.7	.0	4.5
Serge Ibaka^{†}	PF	56	56	1,710	382	60	34	91	846	30.5	6.8	1.1	.6	1.6	15.1
Damjan Rudež	SF	45	0	314	25	20	12	1	82	7.0	.6	.4	.3	.0	1.8
Jodie Meeks	SG	36	10	738	77	45	34	4	327	20.5	2.1	1.3	.9	.1	9.1
Terrence Ross^{†}	SF	24	24	748	68	43	34	13	299	31.2	2.8	1.8	1.4	.5	12.5
C. J. Wilcox	SG	22	0	108	12	12	2	1	21	4.9	.5	.5	.1	.0	1.0
Stephen Zimmerman	C	19	0	108	35	4	2	5	23	5.7	1.8	.2	.1	.3	1.2
Arinze Onuaku	C	8	0	28	6	2	0	1	4	3.5	.8	.3	.0	.1	.5
Marcus Georges-Hunt	SG	5	0	48	9	3	1	0	14	9.6	1.8	.6	.2	.0	2.8
Patricio Garino	SG	5	0	43	7	0	0	0	0	8.6	1.4	.0	.0	.0	.0
Anthony Brown^{†}	SF	2	0	16	7	2	0	0	9	8.0	3.5	1.0	.0	.0	4.5

- ^{†} Denotes player spent time with another team in the season. Stats reflect time with the Magic only.

== Transactions ==
=== Trades ===
June 23, 2016	To Orlando Magic Serge Ibaka	To Oklahoma City Thunder Draft rights to Domantas Sabonis; Victor Oladipo; Ersan İlyasova
July 15, 2016	To Orlando Magic C. J. Wilcox; Cash considerations	To Los Angeles Clippers Devyn Marble; 2020 Cleveland 2nd round-pick
February 14, 2017	To Orlando Magic Terrence Ross; 2017 first-round pick	To Toronto Raptors Serge Ibaka

=== Free agency ===
==== Re-signed ====
Player	Signed
Evan Fournier	5-year contract worth $85 million

==== Additions ====
Player	Signed	Former team
Bismack Biyombo	4-year contract worth $72 million	Toronto Raptors
D. J. Augustin	4-year contract worth $29 million	Denver Nuggets
Jeff Green	1-year contract worth $15 million	Los Angeles Clippers

==== Subtractions ====
Player	Reason left	New team
Andrew Nicholson	4-year contract worth $26 million	Washington Wizards
Jason Smith	3-year contract worth $16 million	Washington Wizards
Brandon Jennings	1-year contract worth $5 million	New York Knicks
Dewayne Dedmon	2-year contract worth $6 million	San Antonio Spurs
Serge Ibaka	Traded	Toronto Raptors
C. J. Wilcox	Waived	Portland Trail Blazers
