= 2016–17 Toronto Raptors season =

NBA professional basketball team season

- Head coach: Dwane Casey
- General manager: Masai Ujiri
- Owners: Maple Leaf Sports & Entertainment
- Arena: Air Canada Centre

Results
- Record: 51–31 (.622)
- Place: Division: 2nd (Atlantic); Conference: 3rd (Eastern)
- Playoff finish: Conference Semifinals (lost to Cavaliers 0–4)
- Stats at Basketball Reference

Local media
- Television: TSN, Sportsnet

The 2016–17 Toronto Raptors season was the 22nd season of the franchise in the National Basketball Association (NBA). On March 25, 2017, the team clinched a team-record fourth straight berth to the NBA playoffs. They finished the regular season with a 51–31 record as the 3rd seed. In the playoffs, the Raptors defeated the Milwaukee Bucks in the first round of the playoffs in six games, then faced the defending NBA champion Cleveland Cavaliers in the second round, whom they met in last season's Eastern Conference finals and lost to in six games. The Raptors were swept in the second round by the Cavaliers in four games making it the second time in three years that the Raptors were swept in the playoffs, having been swept by the Washington Wizards in the first round of the 2015 Playoffs.

== Draft ==
Round	Pick	Player	Position	Nationality	College
1	9	Jakob Pöltl	C	Austria	Utah
1	27	Pascal Siakam	PF	Cameroon	New Mexico State

== Standings ==
=== Division ===
Atlantic Division	W	L	PCT	GB	Home	Road	Div	GP
c – Boston Celtics	53	29	.646	–	30‍–‍11	23‍–‍18	11–5	82
x – Toronto Raptors	51	31	.622	2.0	28‍–‍13	23‍–‍18	14–2	82
New York Knicks	31	51	.378	22.0	19‍–‍22	12‍–‍29	5–11	82
Philadelphia 76ers	28	54	.341	25.0	17‍–‍24	11‍–‍30	7–9	82
Brooklyn Nets	20	62	.244	33.0	13‍–‍28	7‍–‍34	3–13	82

=== Conference ===
Eastern Conference
#	Team	W	L	PCT	GB	GP
1	c – Boston Celtics *	53	29	.646	–	82
2	y – Cleveland Cavaliers *	51	31	.622	2.0	82
3	x – Toronto Raptors	51	31	.622	2.0	82
4	y – Washington Wizards *	49	33	.598	4.0	82
5	x – Atlanta Hawks	43	39	.524	10.0	82
6	x – Milwaukee Bucks	42	40	.512	11.0	82
7	x – Indiana Pacers	42	40	.512	11.0	82
8	x – Chicago Bulls	41	41	.500	12.0	82
9	Miami Heat	41	41	.500	12.0	82
10	Detroit Pistons	37	45	.451	16.0	82
11	Charlotte Hornets	36	46	.439	17.0	82
12	New York Knicks	31	51	.378	22.0	82
13	Orlando Magic	29	53	.354	24.0	82
14	Philadelphia 76ers	28	54	.341	25.0	82
15	Brooklyn Nets	20	62	.244	33.0	82

== Game log ==
=== Pre-season ===
2016–17 game log
Total: 4–3 (home: 2–1; road: 2–2)
Pre-season: 4–3 (home: 2–1; road: 2–2)

Game	Date	Team	Score	High points	High rebounds	High assists	Location Attendance	Record
1	October 1	Warriors	W 97–93	DeMarre Carroll (14)	Jared Sullinger (10)	Kyle Lowry (4)	Rogers Arena; 19,000	1–0
2	October 3	Nuggets	L 106–108	Terrence Ross (23)	Jonas Valančiūnas (9)	Cory Joseph (4)	Scotiabank Saddledome; 19,600	1–1
3	October 5	@ L. A. Clippers	L 98–104	DeMar DeRozan (20)	Jonas Valančiūnas (6)	Nogueira, VanVleet (3)	STAPLES Center; 13,957	1–2
4	October 13	@ Cavaliers	W 119–94	Kyle Lowry (25)	Jonas Valančiūnas (6)	Kyle Lowry (6)	Quicken Loans Arena; 18,834	2–2
5	October 14	San Lorenzo	W 122–105	Fred VanVleet (31)	Jakob Poeltl (6)	Heslip, VanVleet (5)	Air Canada Centre; 15,113	3–2
6	October 19	@ Pistons	W 103–92	Kyle Lowry (27)	Jonas Valančiūnas (12)	Cory Joseph (4)	The Palace of Auburn Hills; 12,334	4–2
7	October 21	@ Wizards	L 82–119	DeMar DeRozan (34)	Poeltl, VanVleet (6)	Kyle Lowry (5)	Verizon Center; 11,967	4–3

2016–17 season schedule

=== Regular season ===
2016–17 game log
Total: 51–31 (home: 28–13; road: 23–18)
October: 2–1 (home: 2–1; road: 0–0)

Game	Date	Team	Score	High points	High rebounds	High assists	Location Attendance	Record
1	October 26	Detroit	W 109–91	DeMar DeRozan (40)	Jonas Valančiūnas (11)	Kyle Lowry (8)	Air Canada Centre; 19,800	1–0
2	October 28	Cleveland	L 91–94	DeMar DeRozan (32)	Jonas Valančiūnas (17)	Kyle Lowry (4)	Air Canada Centre; 19,800	1–1
3	October 31	Denver	W 105–102	DeMar DeRozan (33)	Jonas Valančiūnas (9)	Kyle Lowry (7)	Air Canada Centre; 19,800	2–1

November : 10–5 (home: 4–2; road: 6–3)

Game	Date	Team	Score	High points	High rebounds	High assists	Location Attendance	Record
4	November 2	@ Washington	W 113–103	DeMar DeRozan (40)	Jonas Valančiūnas (7)	DeMar DeRozan (5)	Verizon Center; 19,581	3–1
5	November 4	Miami	W 96–87	DeMar DeRozan (34)	Jonas Valančiūnas (11)	Kyle Lowry (5)	Air Canada Centre; 19,800	4–1
6	November 6	Sacramento	L 91–96	DeMar DeRozan (23)	DeMarre Carroll (8)	Kyle Lowry (10)	Air Canada Centre; 19,800	4–2
7	November 9	@ Oklahoma City	W 112–102	DeMar DeRozan (37)	Kyle Lowry (9)	Kyle Lowry (13)	Chesapeake Energy Arena; 18,203	5–2
8	November 11	@ Charlotte	W 113–111	DeMar DeRozan (34)	Valančiūnas, Lowry (8)	Kyle Lowry (6)	Time Warner Cable Arena; 18,107	6–2
9	November 12	New York	W 118–107	DeMar DeRozan (33)	Lucas Nogueira (10)	Kyle Lowry (6)	Air Canada Centre; 19,800	7–2
10	November 15	@ Cleveland	L 117–121	Kyle Lowry (28)	Jonas Valančiūnas (9)	Kyle Lowry (9)	Quicken Loans Arena; 20,562	7–3
11	November 16	Golden State	L 121–127	DeMar DeRozan (34)	Pascal Siakam (9)	Kyle Lowry (5)	Air Canada Centre; 21,050	7–4
12	November 18	@ Denver	W 113–111 (OT)	DeMar DeRozan (30)	Jonas Valančiūnas (9)	Kyle Lowry (13)	Pepsi Center; 12,476	8–4
13	November 20	@ Sacramento	L 99–102	Kyle Lowry (25)	Jonas Valančiūnas (14)	Kyle Lowry (6)	Golden 1 Center; 17,608	8–5
14	November 21	@ L.A. Clippers	L 115–123	Kyle Lowry (27)	Jonas Valančiūnas (8)	Lowry, DeRozan (7)	Staples Center; 19,060	8–6
15	November 23	@ Houston	W 115–102	DeMar DeRozan (24)	Jonas Valančiūnas (16)	Lowry, DeRozan (9)	Toyota Center; 18,055	9–6
16	November 25	@ Milwaukee	W 105–99	DeMar DeRozan (26)	Siakam, DeRozan (7)	Kyle Lowry (6)	BMO Harris Bradley Center; 16,223	10–6
17	November 28	Philadelphia	W 122–95	Kyle Lowry (24)	Jonas Valančiūnas (11)	Kyle Lowry (8)	Air Canada Centre; 19,800	11–6
18	November 30	Memphis	W 120–105	Kyle Lowry (29)	DeMar DeRozan (9)	Kyle Lowry (8)	Air Canada Centre; 19,800	12–6

December : 10–4 (home: 5–2; road: 5–2)

Game	Date	Team	Score	High points	High rebounds	High assists	Location Attendance	Record
19	December 2	L.A. Lakers	W 113–80	Kyle Lowry (24)	Siakam, Valančiūnas, Patterson, Powell (7)	Kyle Lowry (7)	Air Canada Centre; 19,800	13–6
20	December 3	Atlanta	W 128–84	DeMar DeRozan (21)	Nogueira, Lowry (8)	Kyle Lowry (8)	Air Canada Centre; 19,800	14–6
21	December 5	Cleveland	L 112–116	DeMar DeRozan (31)	Jonas Valančiūnas (10)	Kyle Lowry (9)	Air Canada Centre; 19,800	14–7
22	December 8	Minnesota	W 124–110	DeMar DeRozan (27)	Jonas Valančiūnas (10)	Kyle Lowry (11)	Air Canada Centre; 19,800	15–7
23	December 9	@ Boston	W 101–94	Kyle Lowry (34)	Valančiūnas, Patterson (10)	Patrick Patterson (4)	TD Garden; 18,624	16–7
24	December 12	Milwaukee	W 122–100	DeMar DeRozan (30)	Jonas Valančiūnas (13)	Kyle Lowry (7)	Air Canada Centre; 19.800	17–7
25	December 14	@ Philadelphia	W 123–114	DeMar DeRozan (31)	Jonas Valančiūnas (10)	Lowry, Joseph (7)	Wells Fargo Center; 16,192	18–7
26	December 16	Atlanta	L 121–125	DeMar DeRozan (34)	Jonas Valančiūnas (6)	Kyle Lowry (6)	Air Canada Centre; 19,800	18–8
27	December 18	@ Orlando	W 109–79	DeMar DeRozan (31)	Jonas Valančiūnas (13)	Kyle Lowry (10)	Amway Center; 17,251	19–8
28	December 20	Brooklyn	W 116–104	Kyle Lowry (23)	Jonas Valančiūnas (14)	Kyle Lowry (8)	Air Canada Centre; 19,800	20–8
29	December 23	@ Utah	W 104–98	Kyle Lowry (36)	Jonas Valančiūnas (7)	Kyle Lowry (5)	Vivint Smart Home Arena; 19,911	21–8
30	December 26	@ Portland	W 95–91	Kyle Lowry (27)	Jonas Valančiūnas (12)	DeMar DeRozan (7)	Moda Center; 19,393	22–8
31	December 28	@ Golden State	L 111–121	DeMar DeRozan (29)	Ross, Carroll (7)	Kyle Lowry (11)	ORACLE Arena; 19,596	22–9
32	December 29	@ Phoenix	L 91–99	Lowry, DeRozan (24)	Jonas Valančiūnas (10)	Kyle Lowry (5)	Talking Stick Resort Arena; 18,055	22–10

January : 8–9 (home: 6–4; road: 2–5)

Game	Date	Team	Score	High points	High rebounds	High assists	Location Attendance	Record
33	January 1	@ L.A. Lakers	W 123–114	Kyle Lowry (41)	Siakam, Valančiūnas (10)	Kyle Lowry (7)	Staples Center; 18,997	23–10
34	January 3	@ San Antonio	L 82–110	Kyle Lowry (26)	Jakob Poeltl (9)	Cory Joseph (3)	AT&T Center; 18,418	23–11
35	January 5	Utah	W 101–93	Kyle Lowry (33)	Jonas Valančiūnas (13)	Kyle Lowry (5)	Air Canada Centre; 19,800	24–11
36	January 7	@ Chicago	L 118–123 (OT)	DeMar DeRozan (36)	Kyle Lowry (9)	Kyle Lowry (12)	United Center; 21,195	24–12
37	January 8	Houston	L 122–129	DeMar DeRozan (36)	DeMarre Carroll (8)	Kyle Lowry (6)	Air Canada Centre; 19,800	24–13
38	January 10	Boston	W 114–106	DeMar DeRozan (41)	Jonas Valančiūnas (23)	Kyle Lowry (9)	Air Canada Centre; 19,800	25–13
39	January 13	Brooklyn	W 132–113	DeMar DeRozan (28)	DeMarre Carroll (11)	Kyle Lowry (6)	Air Canada Centre; 19,800	26–13
40	January 15	New York	W 116–101	DeMar DeRozan (23)	Jonas Valančiūnas (16)	Kyle Lowry (9)	Air Canada Centre; 19,800	27–13
41	January 17	@ Brooklyn	W 119–109	DeMar DeRozan (36)	DeMar DeRozan (11)	DeMar DeRozan (6)	Barclays Center; 12,874	28–13
42	January 18	@ Philadelphia	L 89–94	DeMar DeRozan (25)	Jonas Valančiūnas (16)	DeMar DeRozan (6)	Wells Fargo Center; 17,223	28–14
43	January 20	@ Charlotte	L 78–113	Kyle Lowry (24)	Jonas Valančiūnas (6)	Kyle Lowry (3)	Spectrum Center; 18,378	28–15
44	January 22	Phoenix	L 103–115	DeMar DeRozan (22)	Jonas Valančiūnas (12)	Kyle Lowry (6)	Air Canada Centre; 19,800	28–16
45	January 24	San Antonio	L 106–108	Kyle Lowry (30)	Jonas Valančiūnas (13)	Joseph, Valančiūnas, Lowry, Powell (2)	Air Canada Centre; 19,800	28–17
46	January 25	@ Memphis	L 99–101	Kyle Lowry (29)	Jonas Valančiūnas (12)	Kyle Lowry (8)	FedExForum; 15,904	28–18
47	January 27	Milwaukee	W 102–86	Kyle Lowry (32)	Jonas Valančiūnas (11)	Kyle Lowry (6)	Air Canada Centre; 19,800	29–18
48	January 29	Orlando	L 113–114	Kyle Lowry (33)	Patrick Patterson (10)	Kyle Lowry (8)	Air Canada Centre; 19,800	29–19
49	January 31	New Orleans	W 108–106 (OT)	Kyle Lowry (33)	Jonas Valančiūnas (12)	Kyle Lowry (10)	Air Canada Centre; 19,800	30–19

February : 6–5 (home: 4–1; road: 2–4)

Game	Date	Team	Score	High points	High rebounds	High assists	Location Attendance	Record
50	February 1	@ Boston	L 104–109	Kyle Lowry (32)	Carroll, Sullinger, Ross (6)	Kyle Lowry (5)	TD Garden; 18,624	30–20
51	February 3	@ Orlando	L 94–102	Lowry, Powell, Valančiūnas (18)	Jonas Valančiūnas (11)	Kyle Lowry (7)	Amway Center; 17,141	30–21
52	February 5	@ Brooklyn	W 103–95	Jonas Valančiūnas (22)	Kyle Lowry (11)	Kyle Lowry (11)	Barclays Center; 14,245	31–21
53	February 6	L.A. Clippers	W 118–109	DeMar DeRozan (31)	Jonas Valančiūnas (12)	Kyle Lowry (8)	Air Canada Centre; 19,800	32–21
54	February 8	@ Minnesota	L 109–112	DeMar DeRozan (30)	DeMarre Carroll (9)	Kyle Lowry (5)	Target Center; 13,832	32–22
55	February 12	Detroit	L 101–102	DeMar DeRozan (26)	Jonas Valančiūnas (9)	Kyle Lowry (5)	Air Canada Centre; 19,800	32–23
56	February 14	@ Chicago	L 94–105	Kyle Lowry (22)	Jonas Valančiūnas (9)	Lowry, Powell (4)	United Center; 21,220	32–24
57	February 15	Charlotte	W 90–85	Kyle Lowry (21)	Carroll, Valančiūnas (11)	Kyle Lowry (6)	Air Canada Centre; 19,800	33–24
58	February 24	Boston	W 107–97	DeMar DeRozan (43)	P. J. Tucker (10)	Cory Joseph (6)	Air Canada Centre; 19,800	34–24
59	February 26	Portland	W 112–106	DeMar DeRozan (33)	Serge Ibaka (10)	Cory Joseph (6)	Air Canada Centre; 19,800	35–24
60	February 27	@ New York	W 92–91	DeMar DeRozan (33)	DeMar DeRozan (8)	Cory Joseph (4)	Madison Square Garden; 19,812	36–24

March : 10–6 (home: 5–3; road: 5–3)

Game	Date	Team	Score	High points	High rebounds	High assists	Location Attendance	Record
61	March 1	Washington	L 96–105	DeMar DeRozan (24)	Serge Ibaka (12)	Carroll, Powell, Wright (2)	Air Canada Centre; 19,800	36–25
62	March 3	@ Washington	W 114–106	DeMar DeRozan (32)	DeMar DeRozan (13)	DeMar DeRozan (5)	Verizon Center; 20,356	37–25
63	March 4	@ Milwaukee	L 94–101	Serge Ibaka (19)	Jonas Valančiūnas (7)	Cory Joseph (8)	BMO Harris Bradley Center; 16,775	37–26
64	March 8	@ New Orleans	W 94–87	Jonas Valančiūnas (25)	Jonas Valančiūnas (13)	DeMar DeRozan (6)	Smoothie King Center; 14,543	38–26
65	March 10	@ Atlanta	L 99–105	DeMar DeRozan (28)	Jonas Valančiūnas (12)	Cory Joseph (8)	Philips Arena; 16,078	38–27
66	March 11	@ Miami	L 89–104	DeMar DeRozan (17)	Jonas Valančiūnas (10)	Delon Wright (3)	American Airlines Arena; 19,745	38–28
67	March 13	Dallas	W 100–78	DeMar DeRozan (25)	Jonas Valančiūnas (12)	Cory Joseph (4)	Air Canada Centre; 19,800	39–28
68	March 16	Oklahoma City	L 102–123	DeMar DeRozan (22)	Jonas Valančiūnas (5)	Cory Joseph (6)	Air Canada Centre; 19,800	39–29
69	March 17	@ Detroit	W 87–75	Serge Ibaka (17)	Ibaka, Tucker (9)	DeRozan, Joseph (6)	The Palace of Auburn Hills; 16,541	40–29
70	March 19	Indiana	W 116–91	DeMar DeRozan (22)	Jonas Valančiūnas (13)	Cory Joseph (9)	Air Canada Centre; 19,800	41–29
71	March 21	Chicago	W 122–120 (OT)	DeMar DeRozan (42)	P. J. Tucker (12)	DeMar DeRozan (8)	Air Canada Centre; 19,800	42–29
72	March 23	@ Miami	W 101–84	DeMar DeRozan (40)	Patrick Patterson (10)	Tucker, DeRozan, Wright (3)	American Airlines Arena; 19,745	43–29
73	March 25	@ Dallas	W 94–86	Ibaka, DeRozan (18)	P. J. Tucker (9)	DeMar DeRozan (6)	American Airlines Center; 19,934	44–29
74	March 27	Orlando	W 131–112	DeMar DeRozan (36)	Jonas Valančiūnas (9)	Cory Joseph (13)	Air Canada Centre; 19,800	45–29
75	March 29	Charlotte	L 106–110	DeMar DeRozan (28)	Jonas Valančiūnas (15)	DeMar DeRozan (8)	Air Canada Centre; 19,800	45–30
76	March 31	Indiana	W 111–100	DeMar DeRozan (40)	Jonas Valančiūnas (17)	Joseph, Wright (6)	Air Canada Centre; 19,800	46–30

April: 5–1 (home: 2–0; road: 3–1)

Game	Date	Team	Score	High points	High rebounds	High assists	Location Attendance	Record
77	April 2	Philadelphia	W 113–105	Serge Ibaka (24)	Jonas Valančiūnas (8)	DeMar DeRozan (9)	Air Canada Centre; 19,800	47–30
78	April 4	@ Indiana	L 90–108	DeMar DeRozan (27)	Valančiūnas, Ibaka (10)	Delon Wright (4)	Bankers Life Fieldhouse; 16,524	47–31
79	April 5	@ Detroit	W 105–102	Kyle Lowry (27)	Serge Ibaka (7)	Lowry, DeRozan (10)	The Palace of Auburn Hills; 22,076	48–31
80	April 7	Miami	W 96–94	DeMar DeRozan (38)	Jonas Valančiūnas (10)	Kyle Lowry (6)	Air Canada Centre; 19,800	49–31
81	April 9	@ New York	W 110–97	DeMar DeRozan (35)	Valančiūnas, Lowry, Tucker, Poeltl (7)	Kyle Lowry (11)	Madison Square Garden; 19,812	50–31
82	April 12	@ Cleveland	W 98–83	Norman Powell (25)	Pascal Siakam (10)	Fred VanVleet (6)	Quicken Loans Arena; 20,562	51–31

2016–17 season schedule

=== Playoffs ===
2017 playoff game log
Total: 4–6 (home: 2–3; road: 2–3)
First Round: 4–2 (home: 2–1; road: 2–1)

Game	Date	Team	Score	High points	High rebounds	High assists	Location Attendance	Series
1	April 15	Milwaukee	L 83–97	DeMar DeRozan (27)	Serge Ibaka (14)	Kyle Lowry (6)	Air Canada Centre; 19,800	0–1
2	April 18	Milwaukee	W 106–100	DeMar DeRozan (23)	Jonas Valančiūnas (10)	Serge Ibaka (6)	Air Canada Centre; 20,077	1–1
3	April 20	@ Milwaukee	L 77–104	Lowry, Wright (13)	Pöltl, Valančiūnas (7)	Cory Joseph (3)	Bradley Center; 18,717	1–2
4	April 22	@ Milwaukee	W 87–76	DeMar DeRozan (33)	DeMar DeRozan (9)	DeMar DeRozan (5)	Bradley Center; 18,717	2–2
5	April 24	Milwaukee	W 118–93	Norman Powell (25)	Jonas Valančiūnas (7)	Kyle Lowry (10)	Air Canada Centre; 20,251	3–2
6	April 27	@ Milwaukee	W 92–89	DeMar DeRozan (32)	Serge Ibaka (11)	Kyle Lowry (4)	Bradley Center; 18,717	4–2

Conference Semifinals: 0–4 (home: 0–2; road: 0–2)

Game	Date	Team	Score	High points	High rebounds	High assists	Location Attendance	Series
1	May 1	@ Cleveland	L 105–116	Kyle Lowry (20)	P. J. Tucker (11)	Kyle Lowry (11)	Quicken Loans Arena; 20,562	0–1
2	May 3	@ Cleveland	L 103–125	Jonas Valančiūnas (23)	Ibaka, Joseph, Powell, Valančiūnas (5)	Kyle Lowry (5)	Quicken Loans Arena; 20,562	0–2
3	May 5	Cleveland	L 94–115	DeMar DeRozan (37)	Jonas Valančiūnas (8)	Cory Joseph (6)	Air Canada Centre; 20,384	0–3
4	May 7	Cleveland	L 102–109	Serge Ibaka (23)	P. J. Tucker (12)	Cory Joseph (12)	Air Canada Centre; 20,307	0–4

2017 playoff schedule

== Roster ==
2016–17 Toronto Raptors roster
Players

Pos.	No.	Player	Height	Weight	DOB	From
F	20	Bruno Caboclo (DL)	6 ft 9 in (2.06 m)	220 lb (100 kg)	1995-09-21	Brazil
F	5	DeMarre Carroll	6 ft 8 in (2.03 m)	220 lb (100 kg)	1986-07-27	Missouri
G	10	DeMar DeRozan	6 ft 7 in (2.01 m)	220 lb (100 kg)	1989-08-07	USC
F/C	9	Serge Ibaka	7 ft 0 in (2.13 m)	245 lb (111 kg)	1989-09-18	Republic of the Congo
G	6	Cory Joseph	6 ft 3 in (1.91 m)	190 lb (86 kg)	1991-08-20	Texas
G	7	Kyle Lowry	6 ft 1 in (1.85 m)	195 lb (88 kg)	1986-03-25	Villanova
C	92	Lucas Nogueira	7 ft 0 in (2.13 m)	240 lb (109 kg)	1992-07-26	Brazil
F	54	Patrick Patterson	6 ft 9 in (2.06 m)	235 lb (107 kg)	1989-03-14	Kentucky
C	42	Jakob Pöltl	7 ft 0 in (2.13 m)	250 lb (113 kg)	1995-10-15	Utah
G	24	Norman Powell	6 ft 5 in (1.96 m)	215 lb (98 kg)	1993-05-25	UCLA
F	43	Pascal Siakam	6 ft 10 in (2.08 m)	230 lb (104 kg)	1994-02-04	New Mexico State
F	2	P. J. Tucker	6 ft 6 in (1.98 m)	245 lb (111 kg)	1985-05-05	Texas
C	17	Jonas Valančiūnas	7 ft 0 in (2.13 m)	265 lb (120 kg)	1992-05-06	Lithuania
G	23	Fred VanVleet	6 ft 0 in (1.83 m)	195 lb (88 kg)	1994-02-25	Wichita State
G	55	Delon Wright	6 ft 5 in (1.96 m)	190 lb (86 kg)	1992-04-26	Utah

Coaches
Head coach
- Dwane Casey
Assistant(s)
- Rex Kalamian
- Alex McKechnie
- Jama Mahlalela
- Patrick Mutombo
- Nick Nurse
- Jim Sann

Legend
- (DP) Unsigned draft pick
- (FA) Free agent
- (S) Suspended
- (DL) On assignment to
  D-League affiliate
- Injured

Roster
Updated: 2017-03-03

== Player statistics ==
=== Ragular season ===
Player	POS	GP	GS	MP	REB	AST	STL	BLK	PTS	MPG	RPG	APG	SPG	BPG	PPG
Jonas Valančiūnas	C	80	80	2,066	759	57	37	63	959	25.8	9.5	.7	.5	.8	12.0
Cory Joseph	PG	80	22	2,003	235	265	66	13	740	25.0	2.9	3.3	.8	.2	9.3
Norman Powell	SG	76	18	1,368	169	82	52	14	636	18.0	2.2	1.1	.7	.2	8.4
DeMar DeRozan	SG	74	74	2,620	386	290	78	13	2,020	35.4	5.2	3.9	1.1	.2	27.3
DeMarre Carroll	SF	72	72	1,882	275	74	81	27	638	26.1	3.8	1.0	1.1	.4	8.9
Patrick Patterson	PF	65	8	1,599	293	76	40	23	445	24.6	4.5	1.2	.6	.4	6.8
Kyle Lowry	PG	60	60	2,244	286	417	88	19	1,344	37.4	4.8	7.0	1.5	.3	22.4
Lucas Nogueira	C	57	6	1,088	244	42	52	89	253	19.1	4.3	.7	.9	1.6	4.4
Pascal Siakam	PF	55	38	859	185	17	26	45	229	15.6	3.4	.3	.5	.8	4.2
Jakob Pöltl	C	54	4	626	165	12	17	20	165	11.6	3.1	.2	.3	.4	3.1
Terrence Ross^{†}	SF	54	0	1,207	138	45	53	20	559	22.4	2.6	.8	1.0	.4	10.4
Fred VanVleet	PG	37	0	294	42	35	16	3	107	7.9	1.1	.9	.4	.1	2.9
Delon Wright	PG	27	0	446	48	57	27	11	150	16.5	1.8	2.1	1.0	.4	5.6
P. J. Tucker^{†}	SF	24	4	609	129	26	31	5	139	25.4	5.4	1.1	1.3	.2	5.8
Serge Ibaka^{†}	PF	23	23	712	156	15	7	33	327	31.0	6.8	.7	.3	1.4	14.2
Jared Sullinger	PF	11	1	118	27	3	4	1	37	10.7	2.5	.3	.4	.1	3.4
Bruno Caboclo	SF	9	0	40	10	4	2	1	14	4.4	1.1	.4	.2	.1	1.6

- ^{†} Denotes player spent time with another team in the season. Stats reflect time with the Raptors only.

=== Playoffs ===
Player	POS	GP	GS	MP	REB	AST	STL	BLK	PTS	MPG	RPG	APG	SPG	BPG	PPG
DeMar DeRozan	SG	10	10	373	49	34	14	0	224	37.3	4.9	3.4	1.4	.0	22.4
Serge Ibaka	PF	10	10	307	65	14	4	17	143	30.7	6.5	1.4	.4	1.7	14.3
DeMarre Carroll	SF	10	7	155	27	5	8	5	42	15.5	2.7	.5	.8	.5	4.2
Jonas Valančiūnas	C	10	6	226	67	2	2	6	112	22.6	6.7	.2	.2	.6	11.2
Cory Joseph	PG	10	2	212	21	31	4	2	79	21.2	2.1	3.1	.4	.2	7.9
P. J. Tucker	SF	10	1	251	57	11	6	3	50	25.1	5.7	1.1	.6	.3	5.0
Patrick Patterson	PF	10	1	185	20	20	7	2	34	18.5	2.0	2.0	.7	.2	3.4
Norman Powell	SG	9	5	227	28	14	10	3	105	25.2	3.1	1.6	1.1	.3	11.7
Delon Wright	PG	9	0	92	13	13	4	1	25	10.2	1.4	1.4	.4	.1	2.8
Kyle Lowry	PG	8	8	300	25	47	12	4	126	37.5	3.1	5.9	1.5	.5	15.8
Fred VanVleet	PG	7	0	29	1	4	1	0	14	4.1	.1	.6	.1	.0	2.0
Jakob Pöltl	C	6	0	26	12	0	1	1	10	4.3	2.0	.0	.2	.2	1.7
Lucas Nogueira	C	3	0	7	5	0	0	0	3	2.3	1.7	.0	.0	.0	1.0
Pascal Siakam	PF	2	0	10	3	1	1	0	0	5.0	1.5	.5	.5	.0	.0

== Transactions ==
=== Free agency ===
==== Re-signed ====
Player	Signed
DeMar DeRozan	5-year contract worth $139 million

==== Additions ====
Player	Signed	Former team
Jared Sullinger	1-year contract worth $6 million	Boston Celtics
Jarrod Uthoff		Iowa Hawkeyes
Fred VanVleet		Wichita State Shockers
Yanick Moreira		UCAM Murcia
Drew Crawford		Bnei Herzliya

==== Subtractions ====
Player	Reason left	New team
Bismack Biyombo	4-year contract worth $72 million	Orlando Magic
James Johnson	1-year contract worth $4 million	Miami Heat
Luis Scola	1-year contract worth $5.5 million	Brooklyn Nets
Anthony Bennett	2-year contract worth $2.1 million	Brooklyn Nets / (Turkey) Fenerbahçe
Terrence Ross	Traded	Orlando Magic
Jared Sullinger	Traded	Phoenix Suns
