= 2016–17 New York Knicks season =

Season of National Basketball Association team the New York Knicks

- Head coach: Jeff Hornacek
- President: Phil Jackson
- General manager: Steve Mills
- Owners: The Madison Square Garden Company
- Arena: Madison Square Garden

Results
- Record: 31–51 (.378)
- Place: Division: 3rd (Atlantic); Conference: 12th (Eastern)
- Playoff finish: Did not qualify
- Stats at Basketball Reference

Local media
- Television: MSG TV
- Radio: WEPN-FM

The 2016–17 New York Knicks season was the 71st season of the franchise in the National Basketball Association (NBA). On June 2, 2016, the Knicks announced Jeff Hornacek as their new head coach.

In the off-season, the Knicks acquired former MVP Derrick Rose and Justin Holiday from the Chicago Bulls. Joakim Noah, a Manhattan native decided to leave the Bulls to sign with his hometown Knicks, where he grew up a fan.

Following the season, Phil Jackson left as team president, Derrick Rose signed as a free agent with the Cleveland Cavaliers, and Carmelo Anthony was traded to the Oklahoma City Thunder.

== Draft ==
The Knicks did not have a pick in the 2016 NBA Draft.

== Roster ==
2016–17 New York Knicks roster
Players

Pos.	No.	Player	Height	Weight	DOB	From
SF	7	Carmelo Anthony	6 ft 8 in (2.03 m)	240 lb (109 kg)	1984–05–29	Syracuse
SG	31	Ron Baker	6 ft 4 in (1.93 m)	220 lb (100 kg)	1993-03-30	Wichita State
C	14	Willy Hernangómez	6 ft 11 in (2.11 m)	250 lb (113 kg)	1994–05–27	Spain
SG	8	Justin Holiday	6 ft 6 in (1.98 m)	220 lb (100 kg)	1989–04-05	Washington
SF	91	Mindaugas Kuzminskas	6 ft 9 in (2.06 m)	215 lb (98 kg)	1989–10–19	Lithuania
SF	2	Maurice Ndour (DL)	6 ft 9 in (2.06 m)	200 lb (91 kg)	1992–06–18	Ohio
C	13	Joakim Noah (S)	6 ft 11 in (2.11 m)	230 lb (104 kg)	1985–02–25	Florida
C	9	Kyle O'Quinn	6 ft 10 in (2.08 m)	250 lb (113 kg)	1990–03–26	Norfolk State
C	40	Marshall Plumlee (DL)	7 ft 1 in (2.16 m)	250 lb (113 kg)	1992–06–14	Duke
C	6	Kristaps Porziņģis	7 ft 3 in (2.21 m)	240 lb (109 kg)	1995–08–02	Latvia
SG	5	Courtney Lee	6 ft 5 in (1.96 m)	200 lb (91 kg)	1985–10–03	Western Kentucky
PG	4	Chasson Randle	6 ft 2 in (1.88 m)	185 lb (84 kg)	1993–02–05	Stanford
PG	25	Derrick Rose	6 ft 3 in (1.91 m)	190 lb (86 kg)	1988–10–04	Memphis
PF	42	Lance Thomas	6 ft 8 in (2.03 m)	235 lb (107 kg)	1988–04–24	Duke
SG	18	Sasha Vujačić	6 ft 7 in (2.01 m)	195 lb (88 kg)	1984–03–08	Slovenia

Coaches
Head coach
- Jeff Hornacek
Assistant(s)
- Kurt Rambis (associate HC)
- Josh Longstaff (assistant coach/player development)
- Howard Eisley
- Corey Gaines
- Jerry Sichting

Legend
- (DP) Unsigned draft pick
- (FA) Free agent
- (S) Suspended
- (DL) On assignment to D-League affiliate
- Injured

Roster
Updated: 2017–04–03

== Standings ==
=== Division ===
Atlantic Division	W	L	PCT	GB	Home	Road	Div	GP
c – Boston Celtics	53	29	.646	–	30‍–‍11	23‍–‍18	11–5	82
x – Toronto Raptors	51	31	.622	2.0	28‍–‍13	23‍–‍18	14–2	82
New York Knicks	31	51	.378	22.0	19‍–‍22	12‍–‍29	5–11	82
Philadelphia 76ers	28	54	.341	25.0	17‍–‍24	11‍–‍30	7–9	82
Brooklyn Nets	20	62	.244	33.0	13‍–‍28	7‍–‍34	3–13	82

=== Conference ===
Eastern Conference
#	Team	W	L	PCT	GB	GP
1	c – Boston Celtics *	53	29	.646	–	82
2	y – Cleveland Cavaliers *	51	31	.622	2.0	82
3	x – Toronto Raptors	51	31	.622	2.0	82
4	y – Washington Wizards *	49	33	.598	4.0	82
5	x – Atlanta Hawks	43	39	.524	10.0	82
6	x – Milwaukee Bucks	42	40	.512	11.0	82
7	x – Indiana Pacers	42	40	.512	11.0	82
8	x – Chicago Bulls	41	41	.500	12.0	82
9	Miami Heat	41	41	.500	12.0	82
10	Detroit Pistons	37	45	.451	16.0	82
11	Charlotte Hornets	36	46	.439	17.0	82
12	New York Knicks	31	51	.378	22.0	82
13	Orlando Magic	29	53	.354	24.0	82
14	Philadelphia 76ers	28	54	.341	25.0	82
15	Brooklyn Nets	20	62	.244	33.0	82

== Game log ==
=== Pre-season ===
2016 pre-season game log
Total: 4–2 (Home: 2–1; Road: 2–1)
Pre-season: 4–2 (home: 2–1; road: 2–1)

Game	Date	Team	Score	High points	High rebounds	High assists	Location Attendance	Record
1	October 4	@ Rockets	L 103–130	Kristaps Porzingis (22)	Kyle O'Quinn (9)	Derrick Rose (5)	Toyota Center; 14,397	0–1
2	October 8	Nets	W 116–98	Carmelo Anthony (16)	Kristaps Porzingis (6)	Brandon Jennings (5)	Madison Square Garden; 19,601	1–1
3	October 10	Wizards	W 90–88	Carmelo Anthony (19)	Kristaps Porzingis (6)	Hernangomez, Lee (3)	Madison Square Garden; 19,033	2–1
4	October 15	Celtics	L 107–119	Mindaugas Kuzminskas (18)	Willy Hernangomez (12)	Holiday, Jennings (5)	Madison Square Garden; 19,607	2–2
5	October 19	@ Celtics	W 121–96	Kristaps Porzingis (20)	Joakim Noah (7)	Ron Baker (5)	TD Garden; 16,327	3–2
6	October 20	@ Nets	W 116–111	Carmelo Anthony (21)	Kyle O'Quinn (7)	Brandon Jennings (6)	Barclays Center; 17,732	4–2

2016–17 season schedule

=== Regular season ===
2016–17 game log
Total: 31–51 (Home: 19–22; Road: 12–29)
October: 1–1 (home: 1–0; road: 0–1)

Game	Date	Team	Score	High points	High rebounds	High assists	Location Attendance	Record
1	October 25	@ Cleveland	L 88–117	Carmelo Anthony (19)	Kristaps Porzingis (7)	Brandon Jennings (5)	Quicken Loans Arena; 20,562	0–1
2	October 29	Memphis	W 111–104	Carmelo Anthony (20)	Joakim Noah (10)	Joakim Noah (7)	Madison Square Garden; 19,812	1–1

November : 8–8 (home: 6–3; road: 2–5)

Game	Date	Team	Score	High points	High rebounds	High assists	Location Attendance	Record
3	November 1	@ Detroit	L 89–102	Carmelo Anthony (24)	Joakim Noah (11)	Joakim Noah (8)	Palace of Auburn Hills; 13,087	1–2
4	November 2	Houston	L 99–118	Carmelo Anthony (21)	Kristaps Porzingis (8)	Noah, Rose (4)	Madison Square Garden; 19,812	1–3
5	November 4	@ Chicago	W 117–104	Kristaps Porzingis (27)	Joakim Noah (9)	Derrick Rose (11)	United Center; 22,376	2–3
6	November 6	Utah	L 109–114	Porzingis, Anthony (28)	Carmelo Anthony (9)	Derrick Rose (8)	Madison Square Garden; 19,812	2–4
7	November 9	Brooklyn	W 110–96	Carmelo Anthony (22)	Kristaps Porzingis (8)	Brandon Jennings (11)	Madison Square Garden; 19,812	3–4
8	November 11	@ Boston	L 87–115	Kristaps Porzingis (14)	Willy Hernangomez (12)	Derrick Rose (6)	TD Garden; 18,624	3–5
9	November 12	@ Toronto	L 107–118	Carmelo Anthony (31)	Joakim Noah (18)	Brandon Jennings (5)	Air Canada Centre; 19,800	3–6
10	November 14	Dallas	W 93–77	Anthony, Porzingis (24)	Kristaps Porzingis (11)	Derrick Rose (5)	Madison Square Garden; 19,812	4–6
11	November 16	Detroit	W 105–102	Kristaps Porzingis (35)	Joakim Noah (15)	Brandon Jennings (7)	Madison Square Garden; 19,812	5–6
12	November 17	@ Washington	L 112–119	Derrick Rose (24)	Noah, Porzingis (7)	Brandon Jennings (10)	Verizon Center; 16,704	5–7
13	November 20	Atlanta	W 104–94	Carmelo Anthony (31)	Kristaps Porzingis (11)	Derrick Rose (7)	Madison Square Garden; 19,812	6–7
14	November 22	Portland	W 107–103	Kristaps Porzingis (31)	Kristaps Porzingis (9)	Brandon Jennings (11)	Madison Square Garden; 19,120	7–7
15	November 25	Charlotte	W 113–111 (OT)	Carmelo Anthony (35)	Carmelo Anthony (14)	Anthony, Rose (5)	Madison Square Garden; 19,812	8–7
16	November 26	@ Charlotte	L 102–107	Kristaps Porzingis (25)	Anthony, Rose (8)	Derrick Rose (8)	Time Warner Cable Arena; 19,195	8–8
17	November 28	Oklahoma City	L 103–112	Derrick Rose (30)	Carmelo Anthony (8)	Noah, Rose (4)	Madison Square Garden; 19,812	8–9
18	November 30	@ Minnesota	W 106–104	Kristaps Porzingis (29)	Kyle O'Quinn (8)	Brandon Jennings (7)	Target Center; 13,987	9–9

December : 7–8 (home: 4–2; road: 3–6)

Game	Date	Team	Score	High points	High rebounds	High assists	Location Attendance	Record
19	December 2	Minnesota	W 118–114	Carmelo Anthony (29)	Kyle O'Quinn (13)	Brandon Jennings (8)	Madison Square Garden; 19,812	10–9
20	December 4	Sacramento	W 106–98	Anthony, Rose (20)	Kristaps Porzingis (14)	Derrick Rose (6)	Madison Square Garden; 19,812	11–9
21	December 6	@ Miami	W 114–103	Carmelo Anthony (35)	Kristaps Porzingis (12)	Brandon Jennings (9)	American Airlines Arena; 19,610	12–9
22	December 7	Cleveland	L 94–126	Brandon Jennings (16)	O'Quinn, Hernangomez (7)	Courtney Lee (5)	Madison Square Garden; 19,812	12–10
23	December 9	@ Sacramento	W 103–100	Carmelo Anthony (33)	Kristaps Porzingis (10)	Brandon Jennings (7)	Golden 1 Center; 17,608	13−10
24	December 11	@ L. A. Lakers	W 118–112	Kristaps Porzingis (26)	Porzingis, Hernangomez (12)	Carmelo Anthony (7)	Staples Center; 18,997	14–10
25	December 13	@ Phoenix	L 111–113 (OT)	Kristaps Porzingis (34)	Kyle O'Quinn (14)	Anthony, Jennings (5)	Talking Stick Resort Arena; 16,429	14–11
26	December 15	@ Golden State	L 90–103	Justin Holiday (15)	Noah, Hernangomez (10)	Brandon Jennings (6)	Oracle Arena; 19,596	14–12
27	December 17	@ Denver	L 114–127	Carmelo Anthony (29)	Willy Hernangomez (10)	Brandon Jennings (7)	Pepsi Center; 12,042	14–13
28	December 20	Indiana	W 118–111	Carmelo Anthony (35)	Joakim Noah (11)	Derrick Rose (6)	Madison Square Garden; 19,812	15–13
29	December 22	Orlando	W 106–95	Derrick Rose (19)	Kyle O'Quinn (16)	Brandon Jennings (12)	Madison Square Garden; 19,812	16–13
30	December 25	Boston	L 114–119	Carmelo Anthony (29)	Porzingis, Noah (12)	Derrick Rose (3)	Madison Square Garden; 19,812	16–14
31	December 28	@ Atlanta	L 98–102 (OT)	Derrick Rose (26)	Joakim Noah (16)	Derrick Rose (6)	Philips Arena; 15,093	16–15
32	December 30	@ New Orleans	L 92–104	Carmelo Anthony (26)	Carmelo Anthony (13)	Anthony, Noah, Rose (4)	Smoothie King Center; 18,124	16–16
33	December 31	@ Houston	L 122–129	Brandon Jennings (32)	Joakim Noah (16)	Rose, Jennings (7)	Toyota Center; 18,055	16–17

January : 5–12 (home: 2–6; road: 3–6)

Game	Date	Team	Score	High points	High rebounds	High assists	Location Attendance	Record
34	January 2	Orlando	L 103–115	Carmelo Anthony (19)	Joakim Noah (10)	Rose, Jennings (4)	Madison Square Garden; 19,812	16–18
35	January 4	Milwaukee	L 104–105	Carmelo Anthony (30)	Joakim Noah (16)	Carmelo Anthony (7)	Madison Square Garden; 19,812	16–19
36	January 6	@ Milwaukee	W 116–111	Carmelo Anthony (26)	Joakim Noah (9)	Carmelo Anthony (10)	BMO Harris Bradley Center; 18,717	17–19
37	January 7	@ Indiana	L 109–123	Anthony, Jennings (17)	Joakim Noah (6)	Carmelo Anthony (5)	Bankers Life Fieldhouse; 17,367	17–20
38	January 9	New Orleans	L 96–110	Brandon Jennings (20)	Joakim Noah (6)	Jennings, Baker (4)	Madison Square Garden; 19,812	17–21
39	January 11	@ Philadelphia	L 97–98	Carmelo Anthony (28)	Kyle O'Quinn (15)	Lee, Rose (4)	Wells Fargo Center; 18,755	17–22
40	January 12	Chicago	W 104–89	Carmelo Anthony (23)	Joakim Noah (12)	Carmelo Anthony (6)	Madison Square Garden; 19,812	18–22
41	January 15	@ Toronto	L 101–116	Carmelo Anthony (18)	Willy Hernangomez (13)	Brandon Jennings (7)	Air Canada Centre; 19,800	18–23
42	January 16	Atlanta	L 107–108	Carmelo Anthony (30)	Joakim Noah (17)	Derrick Rose (9)	Madison Square Garden; 19,812	18–24
43	January 18	@ Boston	W 117–106	Derrick Rose (30)	Willy Hernangomez (11)	Derrick Rose (5)	TD Garden; 18,624	19–24
44	January 19	Washington	L 110–113	Carmelo Anthony (34)	Carmelo Anthony (10)	Brandon Jennings (5)	Madison Square Garden; 19,812	19–25
45	January 21	Phoenix	L 105–107	Carmelo Anthony (31)	Joakim Noah (15)	Carmelo Anthony (6)	Madison Square Garden; 19,812	19–26
46	January 23	@ Indiana	W 109–103	Carmelo Anthony (26)	Willy Hernangomez (10)	Derrick Rose (6)	Bankers Life Fieldhouse; 16,015	20–26
47	January 25	@ Dallas	L 95–103	Carmelo Anthony (30)	Willy Hernangomez (16)	Anthony, Rose, Jennings (4)	American Airlines Center; 19,750	20–27
48	January 27	Charlotte	W 110–107	Anthony, Porzingis (18)	Carmelo Anthony (11)	Lee, Rose (8)	Madison Square Garden; 19,812	21–27
49	January 29	@ Atlanta	L 139–142 (4OT)	Carmelo Anthony (45)	Joakim Noah (14)	Brandon Jennings (11)	Philips Arena; 13,643	21–28
50	January 31	@ Washington	L 101–117	Carmelo Anthony (26)	Willy Hernangomez (14)	Willy Hernangomez (4)	Verizon Center; 16,683	21–29

February : 3–7 (home: 2–5; road: 1–2)

Game	Date	Team	Score	High points	High rebounds	High assists	Location Attendance	Record
51	February 1	@ Brooklyn	W 95–90	Kristaps Porzingis (19)	Kristaps Porzingis (12)	Brandon Jennings (10)	Barclays Center; 17,732	22–29
52	February 4	Cleveland	L 104–111	Brandon Jennings (23)	Kristaps Porzingis (8)	Brandon Jennings (10)	Madison Square Garden; 19,812	22–30
53	February 6	L. A. Lakers	L 107–121	Carmelo Anthony (26)	Willy Hernangomez (13)	Anthony, Jennings (5)	Madison Square Garden; 19,812	22–31
54	February 8	L. A. Clippers	L 115–119	Carmelo Anthony (28)	Anthony, Hernangomez (9)	Derrick Rose (8)	Madison Square Garden; 19,812	22–32
55	February 10	Denver	L 123–131	Carmelo Anthony (31)	Anthony, O'Quinn (6)	Brandon Jennings (13)	Madison Square Garden; 19,812	22–33
56	February 12	San Antonio	W 94–90	Carmelo Anthony (25)	Willy Hernangómez (9)	Courtney Lee (5)	Madison Square Garden; 19,812	23–33
57	February 15	@ Oklahoma City	L 105–116	Derrick Rose (25)	Willy Hernangomez (10)	Derrick Rose (7)	Chesapeake Energy Arena; 18,203	23–34
58	February 23	@ Cleveland	L 104–119	Courtney Lee (25)	Hernangomez, Quinn (10)	Lee, Anthony (5)	Quicken Loans Arena; 20,562	23–35
59	February 25	Philadelphia	W 110–109	Carmelo Anthony (37)	Willy Hernangómez (9)	Kyle O'Quinn (5)	Madison Square Garden; 19,812	24–35
60	February 27	Toronto	W 92–91	Carmelo Anthony (24)	Willy Hernangómez (9)	Rose, Quinn (4)	Madison Square Garden; 19,800	24–36

March : 5–11 (home: 2–3; road: 3–8)

Game	Date	Team	Score	High points	High rebounds	High assists	Location Attendance	Record
61	March 1	@ Orlando	W 101–90	Kristaps Porzingis (20)	Anthony, Porzingis (9)	Rose, Quinn, Baker (4)	Amway Center; 16,005	25–36
62	March 3	@ Philadelphia	L 102–105	Lance Thomas (21)	Thomas, Porzingis (7)	Derrick Rose (5)	Wells Fargo Center; 18,518	25–37
63	March 5	Golden State	L 105–112	Derrick Rose (24)	Kristaps Porzingis (15)	Kyle O'Quinn (5)	Madison Square Garden; 19,812	25–38
64	March 6	@ Orlando	W 113–105	Courtney Lee (20)	Quinn, Hernangómez (9)	Derrick Rose (6)	Amway Center; 16,046	26–38
65	March 8	@ Milwaukee	L 93–104	Derrick Rose (26)	Willy Hernangómez (12)	Derrick Rose (6)	Bradley Center; 13,767	26–39
66	March 11	@ Detroit	L 92–112	Kristaps Porzingis (18)	Willy Hernangómez (9)	Courtney Lee (5)	The Palace of Auburn Hills; 19,607	26–40
67	March 12	@ Brooklyn	L 112–120	Carmelo Anthony (27)	Hernangómez, Porzingis (10)	Thomas, Porzingis (7)	Barclays Center; 17,732	26–41
68	March 14	Indiana	W 87–81	Carmelo Anthony (22)	Willy Hernangómez (16)	Hernangómez, Rose (4)	Madison Square Garden; 18,261	27–41
69	March 16	Brooklyn	L 110–121	Derrick Rose (22)	Lance Thomas (10)	Carmelo Anthony (5)	Madison Square Garden; 19,812	27–42
70	March 20	@ L. A. Clippers	L 105–114	Porzingis, Rose (18)	Kristaps Porzingis (11)	Derrick Rose (5)	Staples Center; 19,060	27–43
71	March 22	@ Utah	L 101–108	Kristaps Porzingis (24)	Lance Thomas (9)	Derrick Rose (6)	Vivint Smart Home Arena; 19,911	27–44
72	March 23	@ Portland	L 95–110	Kristaps Porzingis (18)	Kristaps Porzingis (9)	Lee, Baker (4)	Moda Center; 19,020	27–45
73	March 25	@ San Antonio	L 98–106	Hernangómez, Rose (24)	Willy Hernangómez (13)	Courtney Lee (7)	AT&T Center; 18,418	27–46
74	March 27	Detroit	W 109–95	Derrick Rose (27)	Kristaps Porzingis (8)	Derrick Rose (6)	Madison Square Garden; 19,812	28–46
75	March 29	Miami	L 88–105	Kristaps Porzingis (20)	Willy Hernangómez (9)	Baker, Holiday, Randle (3)	Madison Square Garden; 19,812	28–47
76	March 31	@ Miami	W 98–94	Kristaps Porzingis (22)	Willy Hernangómez (12)	Sasha Vujacic (7)	AmericanAirlines Arena; 19,600	29–47

April : 2–4 (home: 2–3; road: 0–1)

Game	Date	Team	Score	High points	High rebounds	High assists	Location Attendance	Record
77	April 2	Boston	L 94–110	Courtney Lee (16)	Kyle O'Quinn (9)	Courtney Lee (5)	Madison Square Garden; 19,812	29–48
78	April 4	Chicago	W 100–91	Carmelo Anthony (23)	Ndour, Quinn (12)	Ron Baker (6)	Madison Square Garden; 19,812	30–48
79	April 6	Washington	L 103–106	Carmelo Anthony (23)	Hernangomez, Lee (8)	Carmelo Anthony (4)	Madison Square Garden; 19,812	30–49
80	April 7	@ Memphis	L 88–101	Courtney Lee (16)	Willy Hernangomez (10)	Ron Baker (7)	FedExForum; 17,631	30–50
81	April 9	Toronto	L 97–110	Willy Hernangomez (24)	Willy Hernangomez (11)	Ron Baker (8)	Madison Square Garden; 19,812	30–51
82	April 12	Philadelphia	W 114–113	Justin Holiday (20)	Marshall Plumlee (11)	Sasha Vujacic (6)	Madison Square Garden; 19,812	31–51

2016–17 season schedule

== Player statistics ==
Legend
GP	Games played	GS	Games started	MPG	Minutes per game
FG%	Field-goal percentage	3P%	3-point field-goal percentage	FT%	Free-throw percentage
RPG	Rebounds per game	APG	Assists per game	SPG	Steals per game
BPG	Blocks per game	PPG	Points per game

=== Regular season ===
Player	GP	GS	MPG	FG%	3P%	FT%	RPG	APG	SPG	BPG	PPG
Justin Holiday	82	4	20.0	.433	.355	.825	2.7	1.2	.8	.4	7.7
Kyle O'Quinn	79	8	15.6	.521	.118	.771	5.6	1.5	.5	1.3	6.3
Courtney Lee	77	74	31.9	.456	.401	.867	3.4	2.3	1.1	.3	10.8
Carmelo Anthony	74	74	34.3	.433	.359	.833	5.9	2.9	.8	.5	22.4
Willy Hernangómez	72	22	18.4	.529	.267	.728	7.0	1.3	.6	.5	8.2
Mindaugas Kuzminskas	68	5	14.9	.428	.321	.809	1.9	1.0	.4	.2	6.3
Kristaps Porziņģis	66	65	32.8	.450	.357	.786	7.2	1.5	.7	2.0	18.1
Derrick Rose	64	64	32.5	.471	.217	.874	3.8	4.4	.7	.3	18.0
Brandon Jennings^{†}	58	11	24.6	.380	.340	.756	2.6	4.9	.9	.1	8.6
Ron Baker	52	13	16.5	.378	.267	.651	1.9	2.1	.7	.2	4.1
Joakim Noah	46	46	22.1	.490	.000	.436	8.8	2.2	.7	.8	5.0
Lance Thomas	46	15	21.0	.398	.447	.843	3.1	.8	.5	.1	6.0
Sasha Vujačić	42	4	9.7	.309	.311	.708	1.4	1.2	.3	.0	3.0
Maurice Ndour	32	4	10.3	.453	.143	.731	2.0	.3	.5	.3	3.1
Marshall Plumlee	21	1	8.1	.533		.421	2.4	.5	.2	.2	1.9
Chasson Randle^{†}	18	0	12.5	.389	.313	.935	1.5	1.6	.3	.1	5.3

- ^{†} Denotes player spent time with another team in the season. Stats reflect time with the Knicks only.

== Transactions ==
=== Trades ===
June 22, 2016	To New York Knicks Derrick Rose; Justin Holiday; 2017 2nd round-pick	To Chicago Bulls Robin Lopez; José Calderón; Jerian Grant

=== Free agency ===
==== Re-signed ====
Player	Signed
Lance Thomas	4-year contract worth $27 million
Sasha Vujačić	1-year contract worth $980,431

==== Additions ====
Player	Signed	Former team
Joakim Noah	4-year contract worth $72 million	Chicago Bulls
Courtney Lee	4-year contract worth $50 million	Charlotte Hornets
Brandon Jennings	1-year contract worth $5 million	Orlando Magic
Marshall Plumlee	3-year contract worth $2.5 million	Duke Blue Devils
Mindaugas Kuzminskas	2-year contract worth $6 million	Unicaja Málaga
Maurice Ndour	2-year contract worth $1.5 million	Real Madrid
Amar'e Stoudemire	1-day retirement deal	Miami Heat
Ron Baker		Wichita State Shockers
J. P. Tokoto		Oklahoma City Blue
Chasson Randle		ČEZ Nymburk

==== Subtractions ====
Player	Reason left	New team
Arron Afflalo	2-year contract worth $25 million	Sacramento Kings
Derrick Williams	1-year contract worth $5 million	Miami Heat
Langston Galloway	2-year contract worth $10 million	New Orleans Pelicans
Amar'e Stoudemire	Retired	Hapoel Jerusalem
Lou Amundson	Waived	TNT KaTropa
Brandon Jennings	Waived	Washington Wizards
