= 2016–17 Boston Celtics season =

Season of National Basketball Association team the Boston Celtics

- Division champions
- Head coach: Brad Stevens
- General manager: Danny Ainge
- Owners: Boston Basketball Partners
- Arena: TD Garden

Results
- Record: 53–29 (.646)
- Place: Division: 1st (Atlantic); Conference: 1st (Eastern)
- Playoff finish: Eastern Conference Finals (lost to Cavaliers 1–4)
- Stats at Basketball Reference

Local media
- Television: Comcast SportsNet New England
- Radio: WBZ-FM

The 2016–17 Boston Celtics season was the 71st season of the franchise in the National Basketball Association (NBA). The team obtained the No. 1 seed in the Eastern Conference for the first time since 2008 when they won the NBA title. At 53–29, they finished with the lowest winning percentage of a No. 1 seed since the Detroit Pistons in 2007.

In the playoffs, the Celtics defeated the Chicago Bulls in the first round in six games, advancing to the Semifinals, where they then defeated the Washington Wizards in seven games, advancing to the Eastern Conference finals, where they lost to the defending champion Cleveland Cavaliers in five games. Despite falling short in their quest to win an 18th NBA title, the season was a success, as it saw the team make its deepest playoff run since 2012.

Isaiah Thomas was voted to play in the 2017 All-Star Game.

Following the season, Avery Bradley was traded to the Detroit Pistons, Kelly Olynyk signed with the Miami Heat, and both Isaiah Thomas and Jae Crowder were traded to the Cleveland Cavaliers, ending the Isaiah Thomas era in Boston in exchange for Kyrie Irving. Following a series of moves in the offseason, only Marcus Smart, Al Horford, Jaylen Brown, and Terry Rozier would be the remaining players returned for the following season.

== Draft picks ==
Round	Pick	Player	Position	Nationality	College / Club
1	3	Jaylen Brown	SF	United States	California
1	16	Guerschon Yabusele	PF	France	(France) Rouen Métropole
1	23	Ante Žižić	C	Croatia	(Croatia) Cibona Zagreb
2	31	Deyonta Davis	PF / C	United States	Michigan State
2	35	Rade Zagorac	SG / SF	Serbia	(Serbia) Mega Leks
2	45	Demetrius Jackson	PG	United States	Notre Dame
2	51	Ben Bentil	PF	Ghana	Providence
2	58	Abdel Nader	SF	Egypt	Iowa State

The Boston Celtics hold a modern-day league record with eight picks in the 2016 draft, the most picks held in a single draft since the NBA modified the draft to two rounds. Their top selection was acquired from the Brooklyn Nets due to them holding the third-worst record on the season. It was part of their return for trading Kevin Garnett and Paul Pierce in 2013. Their middle first-round selection, meanwhile, was acquired from the Dallas Mavericks in the 2014 trade that saw Rajon Rondo and Dwight Powell shipped out of Boston. The last first-round selection they held was their own. Meanwhile, every second-round selection for the Celtics that year was acquired via trade while their own second-round selection (which would have been pick #52) was sent away to the Utah Jazz.

For the first round of the draft, the Celtics drafted Jaylen Brown from the University of California, Guerschon Yabusele from France, and Ante Žižić from Croatia. In the second round, Boston took a surprise lottery-level talent still on the board in Deyonta Davis from Michigan State University, Rade Zagorac from Serbia, Demetrius Jackson (also considered by some a first-round level talent) from the University of Notre Dame, the first ever Ghanaian chosen in Ben Bentil (projected to be picked late in the first round) from Providence College, and the Egyptian Abdel Nader from Iowa State University. Deyonta Davis and Rade Zagorac would be the only players whose draft rights would be traded the night of the draft, as they would be going to the Memphis Grizzlies later for a 2018 second-round selection. Meanwhile, both Guerschon Yabusele and Ante Žižić would continue to remain overseas in China and Croatia respectively for one more season. The others signed contracts with the team, save for Ben Bentil and Abdel Nader. The latter headed off to the Maine Red Claws and the former travelled to the Fort Wayne Mad Ants (three different times) and the Xinjiang Flying Tigers in China before being a part of the Dallas Mavericks later on in the season.

== Game log ==
=== Preseason ===
2016 pre-season game log
Total: 5–2 (home: 2–1; road: 3–1)
Pre-season: 5–2 (home: 2–1; road: 3–1)

Game	Date	Team	Score	High points	High rebounds	High assists	Location Attendance	Record
1	October 4	@ Philadelphia	L 89–92	Terry Rozier (12)	Al Horford (8)	Avery Bradley (6)	Mullins Center; 9,400	0–1
2	October 6	@ Charlotte	W 107–92	Isaiah Thomas (15)	Al Horford (8)	Bradley, Thomas (5)	Greensboro Coliseum; 8,021	1–1
3	October 8	Charlotte	W 104–86	Jordan Mickey (16)	Jordan Mickey (6)	Hunter, Smart (5)	Mohegan Sun Arena; 8,052	2–1
4	October 13	@ Brooklyn	W 100–97	Horford, Smart (13)	Al Horford (9)	Terry Rozier (7)	Barclays Center; 11,043	3–1
5	October 15	@ New York	W 119–107	R. J. Hunter (17)	Amir Johnson (6)	Demetrius Jackson (6)	Madison Square Garden; 19,607	4–1
6	October 17	Brooklyn	W 120–99	Isaiah Thomas (19)	Jonas Jerebko (7)	Green, Smart (4)	TD Garden; 15,925	5–1
7	October 19	New York	L 96–121	Jaylen Brown (17)	Mickey, Young (7)	Demetrius Jackson (4)	TD Garden; 16,327	5–2

2016–17 season schedule

== Standings ==
=== Division ===
Atlantic Division	W	L	PCT	GB	Home	Road	Div	GP
c – Boston Celtics	53	29	.646	–	30‍–‍11	23‍–‍18	11–5	82
x – Toronto Raptors	51	31	.622	2.0	28‍–‍13	23‍–‍18	14–2	82
New York Knicks	31	51	.378	22.0	19‍–‍22	12‍–‍29	5–11	82
Philadelphia 76ers	28	54	.341	25.0	17‍–‍24	11‍–‍30	7–9	82
Brooklyn Nets	20	62	.244	33.0	13‍–‍28	7‍–‍34	3–13	82

=== Conference ===
Eastern Conference
#	Team	W	L	PCT	GB	GP
1	c – Boston Celtics *	53	29	.646	–	82
2	y – Cleveland Cavaliers *	51	31	.622	2.0	82
3	x – Toronto Raptors	51	31	.622	2.0	82
4	y – Washington Wizards *	49	33	.598	4.0	82
5	x – Atlanta Hawks	43	39	.524	10.0	82
6	x – Milwaukee Bucks	42	40	.512	11.0	82
7	x – Indiana Pacers	42	40	.512	11.0	82
8	x – Chicago Bulls	41	41	.500	12.0	82
9	Miami Heat	41	41	.500	12.0	82
10	Detroit Pistons	37	45	.451	16.0	82
11	Charlotte Hornets	36	46	.439	17.0	82
12	New York Knicks	31	51	.378	22.0	82
13	Orlando Magic	29	53	.354	24.0	82
14	Philadelphia 76ers	28	54	.341	25.0	82
15	Brooklyn Nets	20	62	.244	33.0	82

=== Regular season ===
2016–17 game log
Total: 53–29 (home: 30–11; road: 23–18)
October: 2–1 (home: 1–0; road: 1–1)

Game	Date	Team	Score	High points	High rebounds	High assists	Location Attendance	Record
1	October 26	Brooklyn	W 122–117	Isaiah Thomas (25)	Avery Bradley (9)	Isaiah Thomas (9)	TD Garden; 18,624	1–0
2	October 27	@ Chicago	L 99–105	Isaiah Thomas (25)	Al Horford (7)	Bradley, Horford (5)	United Center; 21,501	1–1
3	October 29	@ Charlotte	W 104–98	Avery Bradley (31)	Avery Bradley (11)	Isaiah Thomas (9)	Spectrum Center; 18,708	2–1

November : 8–7 (home: 3–4; road: 5–3)

Game	Date	Team	Score	High points	High rebounds	High assists	Location Attendance	Record
4	November 2	Chicago	W 107–100	Amir Johnson (23)	Amir Johnson (6)	Isaiah Thomas (9)	TD Garden; 18,624	3–1
5	November 3	@ Cleveland	L 122–128	Isaiah Thomas (30)	Zeller, Bradley (10)	Thomas, Zeller (9)	Quicken Loans Arena; 20,562	3–2
6	November 6	Denver	L 107–123	Isaiah Thomas (30)	Avery Bradley (11)	Avery Bradley (6)	TD Garden; 17,452	3–3
7	November 9	@ Washington	L 93–118	Isaiah Thomas (23)	Thomas, Olynyk (6)	Isaiah Thomas (10)	Verizon Center; 12,675	3–4
8	November 11	New York	W 115–87	Isaiah Thomas (29)	Avery Bradley (10)	Marcus Smart (10)	TD Garden; 18,624	4–4
9	November 12	@ Indiana	W 105–99	Isaiah Thomas (23)	Amir Johnson (9)	Bradley, Thomas (5)	Bankers Life Fieldhouse; 17,923	5–4
10	November 14	@ New Orleans	L 105–106	Isaiah Thomas (37)	Avery Bradley (10)	Isaiah Thomas (7)	Smoothie King Center; 15,001	5–5
11	November 16	Dallas	W 90–83	Isaiah Thomas (30)	Avery Bradley (13)	Isaiah Thomas (6)	TD Garden; 18,624	6–5
12	November 18	Golden State	L 88–104	Avery Bradley (17)	Avery Bradley (10)	Terry Rozier (5)	TD Garden; 18,624	6–6
13	November 19	@ Detroit	W 94–92	Al Horford (18)	Al Horford (11)	Isaiah Thomas (8)	The Palace of Auburn Hills; 16,107	7–6
14	November 21	@ Minnesota	W 99–93	Isaiah Thomas (29)	Horford, Smart (6)	Horford, Smart (5)	Target Center; 13,167	8–6
15	November 23	@ Brooklyn	W 111–92	Isaiah Thomas (23)	Amir Johnson (9)	Al Horford (8)	Barclays Center; 16,210	9–6
16	November 25	San Antonio	L 103–109	Isaiah Thomas (24)	Al Horford (10)	Marcus Smart (10)	TD Garden; 18,624	9–7
17	November 28	@ Miami	W 112–104	Isaiah Thomas (25)	Tyler Zeller (7)	Isaiah Thomas (8)	American Airlines Arena; 19,600	10–7
18	November 30	Detroit	L 114–121	Isaiah Thomas (25)	Avery Bradley (10)	Terry Rozier (6)	TD Garden; 17,338	10–8

December : 10–6 (home: 4–2; road: 6–4)

Game	Date	Team	Score	High points	High rebounds	High assists	Location Attendance	Record
19	December 2	Sacramento	W 97–92	Al Horford (26)	Bradley, Jerebko (9)	Isaiah Thomas (7)	TD Garden; 18,624	11−8
20	December 3	@ Philadelphia	W 107–106	Isaiah Thomas (37)	Avery Bradley (9)	Isaiah Thomas (7)	Wells Fargo Center; 17,063	12–8
21	December 5	@ Houston	L 106–107	Al Horford (21)	Avery Bradley (10)	Al Horford (9)	Toyota Center; 15,730	12–9
22	December 7	@ Orlando	W 117–87	Avery Bradley (23)	Jae Crowder (10)	Al Horford (8)	Amway Center; 17,009	13–9
23	December 9	Toronto	L 94–101	Bradley, Horford (19)	Kelly Olynyk (9)	Al Horford (6)	TD Garden; 18,624	13–10
24	December 11	@ Oklahoma City	L 96–99	Al Horford (19)	Amir Johnson (8)	Marcus Smart (9)	Chesapeake Energy Arena; 18,203	13–11
25	December 14	@ San Antonio	L 101–108	Avery Bradley (25)	Avery Bradley (10)	Bradley, Smart (9)	AT&T Center; 18,418	13–12
26	December 16	Charlotte	W 96–88	Isaiah Thomas (26)	Al Horford (8)	Horford, Smart, Thomas (5)	TD Garden; 18,624	14–12
27	December 18	@ Miami	W 105–95	Isaiah Thomas (23)	Al Horford (7)	Al Horford (8)	American Airlines Arena; 19,600	15–12
28	December 20	@ Memphis	W 112–109 (OT)	Isaiah Thomas (44)	Al Horford (14)	Isaiah Thomas (6)	FedExForum; 16,519	16–12
29	December 22	@ Indiana	W 109–102	Isaiah Thomas (28)	Al Horford (11)	Isaiah Thomas (9)	Bankers Life Fieldhouse; 17,577	17–12
30	December 23	Oklahoma City	L 112–117	Isaiah Thomas (34)	Johnson, Bradley, Horford, Jerebko (6)	Isaiah Thomas (10)	TD Garden; 18,624	17–13
31	December 25	@ New York	W 119–114	Isaiah Thomas (27)	Al Horford (7)	Marcus Smart (7)	Madison Square Garden; 19,812	18–13
32	December 27	Memphis	W 113–103	Avery Bradley (23)	Amir Johnson (10)	Isaiah Thomas (7)	TD Garden; 18,624	19–13
33	December 29	@ Cleveland	L 118–124	Isaiah Thomas (31)	Jonas Jerebko (7)	Isaiah Thomas (9)	Quicken Loans Arena; 20,562	19–14
34	December 30	Miami	W 117–114	Isaiah Thomas (52)	Al Horford (6)	Marcus Smart (6)	TD Garden; 18,624	20–14

January : 10–4 (home: 8–2; road: 2–2)

Game	Date	Team	Score	High points	High rebounds	High assists	Location Attendance	Record
35	January 3	Utah	W 115–104	Isaiah Thomas (29)	Kelly Olynyk (7)	Isaiah Thomas (15)	TD Garden; 18,624	21–14
36	January 6	Philadelphia	W 110–106	Avery Bradley (26)	Al Horford (12)	Marcus Smart (8)	TD Garden; 18,624	22–14
37	January 7	New Orleans	W 117–108	Isaiah Thomas (38)	Al Horford (7)	Al Horford (8)	TD Garden; 18,624	23–14
38	January 10	@ Toronto	L 106–114	Isaiah Thomas (27)	Al Horford (9)	Isaiah Thomas (7)	Air Canada Centre; 19,800	23–15
39	January 11	Washington	W 117–108	Isaiah Thomas (38)	Al Horford (9)	Isaiah Thomas (5)	TD Garden; 18,624	24–15
40	January 13	@ Atlanta	W 103–101	Isaiah Thomas (28)	Jae Crowder (9)	Isaiah Thomas (9)	Philips Arena; 18,216	25–15
41	January 16	Charlotte	W 108–98	Isaiah Thomas (35)	Kelly Olynyk (9)	Horford, Olynyk, Smart, Thomas (4)	TD Garden; 18,624	26–15
42	January 18	New York	L 106–117	Isaiah Thomas (39)	Horford, Johnson (7)	Al Horford (10)	TD Garden; 18,624	26–16
43	January 21	Portland	L 123–127 (OT)	Isaiah Thomas (41)	Al Horford (9)	Smart, Thomas (6)	TD Garden; 18,624	26–17
44	January 24	@ Washington	L 108–123	Isaiah Thomas (25)	Jae Crowder (6)	Isaiah Thomas (13)	Verizon Center; 16,387	26–18
45	January 25	Houston	W 120–109	Isaiah Thomas (38)	Jae Crowder (10)	Horford, Thomas (9)	TD Garden; 18,624	27–18
46	January 27	Orlando	W 128–98	Isaiah Thomas (21)	Jonas Jerebko (8)	Marcus Smart (11)	TD Garden; 18,624	28–18
47	January 28	@ Milwaukee	W 112–108 (OT)	Isaiah Thomas (37)	Johnson, Olynyk (7)	Isaiah Thomas (8)	Bradley Center; 18,717	29–18
48	January 30	Detroit	W 113–109	Isaiah Thomas (41)	Jonas Jerebko (10)	Isaiah Thomas (8)	TD Garden; 18,188	30–18

February : 8–4 (home: 4–1; road: 4–3)

Game	Date	Team	Score	High points	High rebounds	High assists	Location Attendance	Record
49	February 1	Toronto	W 109–104	Isaiah Thomas (44)	Jae Crowder (8)	Isaiah Thomas (7)	TD Garden; 18,624	31–18
50	February 3	L.A. Lakers	W 113–107	Isaiah Thomas (38)	Kelly Olynyk (9)	Al Horford (8)	TD Garden; 16,433	32–18
51	February 5	L.A. Clippers	W 107–102	Isaiah Thomas (28)	Al Horford (15)	Isaiah Thomas (8)	TD Garden; 18,624	33–18
52	February 8	@ Sacramento	L 92–108	Isaiah Thomas (26)	Kelly Olynyk (8)	Isaiah Thomas (7)	Golden 1 Center; 17,608	33–19
53	February 9	@ Portland	W 120–111	Isaiah Thomas (34)	Olynyk, Brown (8)	Rozier, Smart (5)	Moda Center; 19,393	34–19
54	February 11	@ Utah	W 112–104	Isaiah Thomas (29)	Al Horford (9)	Thomas, Smart (5)	Vivint Smart Home Arena; 19,911	35–19
55	February 13	@ Dallas	W 111–98	Isaiah Thomas (29)	Olynyk, Johnson (7)	Isaiah Thomas (8)	American Airlines Center; 20,159	36–19
56	February 15	Philadelphia	W 116–108	Isaiah Thomas (33)	Kelly Olynyk (7)	Marcus Smart (5)	TD Garden; 18,624	37–19
57	February 16	@ Chicago	L 103–104	Isaiah Thomas (29)	Kelly Olynyk (7)	Isaiah Thomas (7)	United Center; 21,866	37–20
All-Star Break
58	February 24	@ Toronto	L 97–107	Isaiah Thomas (20)	Amir Johnson (6)	Isaiah Thomas (5)	Air Canada Centre; 19,800	37–21
59	February 26	@ Detroit	W 104–98	Isaiah Thomas (33)	Jae Crowder (11)	Crowder, Horford (5)	Palace of Auburn Hills; 16,107	38–21
60	February 27	Atlanta	L 98–114	Isaiah Thomas (19)	Isaiah Thomas (7)	Isaiah Thomas (7)	TD Garden; 18,624	38–22

March : 11–5 (home: 8–1; road: 3–4)

Game	Date	Team	Score	High points	High rebounds	High assists	Location Attendance	Record
61	March 1	Cleveland	W 103–99	Isaiah Thomas (31)	Crowder, Horford (10)	Al Horford (10)	TD Garden; 18,624	39–22
62	March 3	@ L. A. Lakers	W 115–95	Isaiah Thomas (18)	Jaylen Brown (8)	Isaiah Thomas (8)	Staples Center; 18,997	40–22
63	March 5	@ Phoenix	L 106–109	Isaiah Thomas (35)	Jae Crowder (10)	Isaiah Thomas (5)	Talking Stick Resort Arena; 16,790	40–23
64	March 6	@ L. A. Clippers	L 102–116	Isaiah Thomas (32)	Jae Crowder (8)	Isaiah Thomas (5)	Staples Center; 19,283	40–24
65	March 8	@ Golden State	W 99–86	Isaiah Thomas (25)	Jae Crowder (10)	Al Horford (6)	Oracle Arena; 19,596	41–24
66	March 10	@ Denver	L 99–119	Isaiah Thomas (21)	Marcus Smart (7)	Isaiah Thomas (5)	Pepsi Center; 17,147	41–25
67	March 12	Chicago	W 100–80	Isaiah Thomas (22)	Jae Crowder (10)	Al Horford (6)	TD Garden; 18,624	42–25
68	March 15	Minnesota	W 117–104	Isaiah Thomas (27)	Al Horford (9)	Al Horford (8)	TD Garden; 18,624	43–25
69	March 17	@ Brooklyn	W 98–95	Jae Crowder (24)	Jae Crowder (12)	Marcus Smart (5)	Barclays Center; 16,210	44–25
70	March 19	@ Philadelphia	L 99–105	Al Horford (27)	Al Horford (8)	Marcus Smart (8)	Wells Fargo Center; 19,446	44–26
71	March 20	Washington	W 110–102	Isaiah Thomas (25)	Kelly Olynyk (11)	Al Horford (5)	TD Garden; 18,624	45–26
72	March 22	Indiana	W 109–100	Isaiah Thomas (25)	Horford, Olynyk (8)	Al Horford (8)	TD Garden; 18,624	46–26
73	March 24	Phoenix	W 130–120	Isaiah Thomas (34)	Horford, Crowder (10)	Isaiah Thomas (7)	TD Garden; 18,624	47–26
74	March 26	Miami	W 112–108	Isaiah Thomas (30)	Al Horford (10)	Marcus Smart (9)	TD Garden; 18,624	48–26
75	March 29	Milwaukee	L 100–103	Isaiah Thomas (32)	Marcus Smart (11)	Al Horford (6)	TD Garden; 18,624	48–27
76	March 31	Orlando	W 117–116	Isaiah Thomas (35)	Al Horford (9)	Isaiah Thomas (7)	TD Garden; 18,624	49–27

April: 4–2 (home: 2–1; road: 2–1)

Game	Date	Team	Score	High points	High rebounds	High assists	Location Attendance	Record
77	April 2	@ New York	W 110–94	Isaiah Thomas (19)	Jonas Jerebko (9)	Isaiah Thomas (6)	Madison Square Garden; 19,812	50–27
78	April 5	Cleveland	L 91–114	Isaiah Thomas (26)	Bradley, Horford (7)	Isaiah Thomas (6)	TD Garden; 18,624	50–28
79	April 6	@ Atlanta	L 116–123	Isaiah Thomas (35)	Kelly Olynyk (8)	Marcus Smart (7)	Philips Arena; 18,688	50–29
80	April 8	@ Charlotte	W 121–114	Isaiah Thomas (35)	Kelly Olynyk (11)	Al Horford (7)	Spectrum Center; 19,407	51–29
81	April 10	Brooklyn	W 114–105	Isaiah Thomas (27)	Crowder, Horford, Jerebko (8)	Crowder, Smart (6)	TD Garden; 18,624	52–29
82	April 12	Milwaukee	W 112–94	Gerald Green (18)	Green, Horford (6)	Smart, Thomas (8)	TD Garden; 18,624	53–29

2016–17 season schedule

== Roster ==
2016–17 Boston Celtics roster
Players

Pos.	No.	Player	Height	Weight	DOB	From
PG	0	Avery Bradley	6 ft 2 in (1.88 m)	180 lb (82 kg)	1990-11-26	Texas
SG	7	Jaylen Brown	6 ft 7 in (2.01 m)	225 lb (102 kg)	1996-10-24	California
SF	99	Jae Crowder	6 ft 6 in (1.98 m)	235 lb (107 kg)	1990-07-06	Marquette
SG	30	Gerald Green	6 ft 7 in (2.01 m)	205 lb (93 kg)	1986-01-26	Gulf Shores Academy HS (TX)
C	42	Al Horford	6 ft 10 in (2.08 m)	250 lb (113 kg)	1986-06-03	Florida
PG	9	Demetrius Jackson (DL)	6 ft 1 in (1.85 m)	201 lb (91 kg)	1994-09-07	Notre Dame
PF	8	Jonas Jerebko	6 ft 10 in (2.08 m)	231 lb (105 kg)	1987-03-02	Sweden
PF	90	Amir Johnson	6 ft 9 in (2.06 m)	240 lb (109 kg)	1987-05-01	Westchester HS (CA)
PF	55	Jordan Mickey (DL)	6 ft 8 in (2.03 m)	235 lb (107 kg)	1994-07-09	LSU
C	41	Kelly Olynyk	7 ft 0 in (2.13 m)	238 lb (108 kg)	1991-04-19	Gonzaga
PG	12	Terry Rozier	6 ft 2 in (1.88 m)	190 lb (86 kg)	1994-03-17	Louisville
PG	36	Marcus Smart	6 ft 4 in (1.93 m)	227 lb (103 kg)	1994-03-06	Oklahoma State
PG	4	Isaiah Thomas	5 ft 9 in (1.75 m)	185 lb (84 kg)	1989-02-07	Washington
SG	13	James Young	6 ft 6 in (1.98 m)	215 lb (98 kg)	1995-08-16	Kentucky
C	44	Tyler Zeller	7 ft 0 in (2.13 m)	253 lb (115 kg)	1990-01-17	North Carolina

Coaches
Head coach
- Brad Stevens
Assistant(s)
- Jerome Allen
- Jay Larrañaga
- Walter McCarty
- Micah Shrewsberry
- Jamie Young

Legend
- (DP) Unsigned draft pick
- (FA) Free agent
- (S) Suspended
- (DL) On assignment to D-League affiliate
- Injured

Roster
Updated: 2017-05-08

== Playoffs ==
2017 playoff game log
Total: 9–9 (home: 5–5; road: 4–4)
First Round: 4–2 (home: 1–2; road: 3–0)

Game	Date	Team	Score	High points	High rebounds	High assists	Location Attendance	Series
1	April 16	Chicago	L 102–106	Isaiah Thomas (33)	Jae Crowder (8)	Al Horford (8)	TD Garden; 18,624	0–1
2	April 18	Chicago	L 97–111	Isaiah Thomas (20)	Al Horford (11)	Kelly Olynyk (7)	TD Garden; 18,624	0–2
3	April 21	@ Chicago	W 104–87	Al Horford (18)	Al Horford (8)	Isaiah Thomas (9)	United Center; 21,293	1–2
4	April 23	@ Chicago	W 104–95	Isaiah Thomas (33)	Al Horford (12)	Isaiah Thomas (7)	United Center; 21,863	2–2
5	April 26	Chicago	W 108–97	Bradley, Thomas (24)	Al Horford (7)	Al Horford (9)	TD Garden; 18,624	3–2
6	April 28	@ Chicago	W 105–83	Avery Bradley (23)	Horford, Olynyk (6)	Al Horford (7)	United Center; 21,682	4–2

Conference Semifinals: 4–3 (home: 4–0; road: 0–3)

Game	Date	Team	Score	High points	High rebounds	High assists	Location Attendance	Series
1	April 30	Washington	W 123–111	Isaiah Thomas (33)	Al Horford (9)	Al Horford (10)	TD Garden; 18,624	1–0
2	May 2	Washington	W 129–119 (OT)	Isaiah Thomas (53)	Al Horford (12)	Marcus Smart (5)	TD Garden; 18,624	2–0
3	May 4	@ Washington	L 89–116	Al Horford (16)	Jae Crowder (7)	Isaiah Thomas (4)	Verizon Center; 20,356	2–1
4	May 7	@ Washington	L 102–121	Isaiah Thomas (19)	Crowder, Rozier (7)	Marcus Smart (6)	Verizon Center; 20,356	2–2
5	May 10	Washington	W 123–101	Avery Bradley (29)	Marcus Smart (11)	Isaiah Thomas (9)	TD Garden; 18,624	3–2
6	May 12	@ Washington	L 91–92	Bradley, Thomas (27)	Kelly Olynyk (8)	Jae Crowder (8)	Verizon Center; 20,356	3–3
7	May 15	Washington	W 115–105	Isaiah Thomas (29)	Horford, Smart (6)	Isaiah Thomas (12)	TD Garden; 18,624	4–3

Conference Finals: 1–4 (home: 0–3; road: 1–1)

Game	Date	Team	Score	High points	High rebounds	High assists	Location Attendance	Series
1	May 17	Cleveland	L 104–117	Bradley, Crowder (21)	Jaylen Brown (9)	Isaiah Thomas (10)	TD Garden; 18,624	0–1
2	May 19	Cleveland	L 86–130	Jaylen Brown (19)	Horford, Mickey (6)	Marcus Smart (7)	TD Garden; 18,624	0–2
3	May 21	@ Cleveland	W 111–108	Marcus Smart (27)	Jae Crowder (11)	Marcus Smart (7)	Quicken Loans Arena; 20,562	1–2
4	May 23	@ Cleveland	L 99–112	Avery Bradley (19)	Jae Crowder (8)	Al Horford (7)	Quicken Loans Arena; 20,562	1–3
5	May 25	Cleveland	L 102–135	Avery Bradley (23)	Jae Crowder (6)	Terry Rozier (7)	TD Garden; 18,624	1–4

2017 playoff schedule

== Player statistics ==
Legend
GP	Games played	GS	Games started	MPG	Minutes per game
FG%	Field-goal percentage	3P%	3-point field-goal percentage	FT%	Free-throw percentage
RPG	Rebounds per game	APG	Assists per game	SPG	Steals per game
BPG	Blocks per game	PPG	Points per game

=== Regular season ===
Boston Celtics statistics
Player	GP	GS	MPG	FG%	3P%	FT%	RPG	APG	SPG	BPG	PPG
Amir Johnson	80	77	20.1	.576	.409	.670	4.6	1.8	.6	.8	6.5
Marcus Smart	79	24	30.4	.359	.283	.812	3.9	4.6	1.6	.4	10.6
Jaylen Brown	78	20	17.2	.454	.341	.685	2.8	.8	.4	.2	6.6
Jonas Jerebko	78	6	15.8	.435	.346	.703	3.5	.9	.3	.2	3.8
Isaiah Thomas	76	76	33.8	.463	.379	.909	2.7	5.9	.9	.2	28.9
Kelly Olynyk	75	6	20.5	.512	.354	.732	4.8	2.0	.6	.4	9.0
Terry Rozier	74	0	17.1	.367	.318	.773	3.1	1.8	.6	.1	5.5
Jae Crowder	72	72	32.4	.463	.398	.811	5.8	2.2	1.0	.3	13.9
Al Horford	68	68	32.3	.473	.355	.800	6.8	5.0	.8	1.3	14.0
Avery Bradley	55	55	33.4	.463	.390	.731	6.1	2.2	1.2	.2	16.3
Tyler Zeller	51	5	10.3	.494	.000	.564	2.4	.8	.1	.4	3.5
Gerald Green	47	0	11.4	.409	.351	.805	1.8	.7	.2	.1	5.6
James Young	29	0	7.6	.431	.343	.667	.9	.1	.3	.1	2.3
Jordan Mickey	25	1	5.6	.441	.000	.571	1.4	.3	.1	.2	1.5
Demetrius Jackson	5	0	3.4	.750	1.000	.500	.8	.6	.0	.0	2.0

=== Playoffs ===
Boston Celtics statistics
Player	GP	GS	MPG	FG%	3P%	FT%	RPG	APG	SPG	BPG	PPG
Avery Bradley	18	18	35.8	.441	.351	.778	3.9	2.3	1.3	.2	16.7
Al Horford	18	18	33.9	.584	.519	.759	6.6	5.4	.8	.8	15.1
Jae Crowder	18	18	33.1	.435	.352	.833	6.4	2.7	1.1	.3	13.6
Marcus Smart	18	3	29.9	.351	.397	.640	4.7	4.7	1.5	.9	8.6
Kelly Olynyk	18	2	19.2	.512	.319	.733	3.2	1.9	.7	.8	9.2
Terry Rozier	17	0	16.3	.402	.368	.800	2.6	1.9	.6	.2	5.6
Jaylen Brown	17	0	12.6	.479	.217	.667	2.1	.8	.4	.1	5.0
Isaiah Thomas	15	15	34.7	.425	.333	.820	3.1	6.7	.9	.1	23.3
Amir Johnson	14	9	10.1	.500	.333	.625	2.1	.2	.3	.4	2.6
Gerald Green	13	7	14.8	.472	.467	.889	1.5	.7	.2	.1	7.5
Jonas Jerebko	12	0	10.7	.484	.333	1.000	2.4	1.0	.4	.3	3.6
Tyler Zeller	11	0	7.1	.520		.750	1.7	.7	.0	.2	2.9
James Young	10	0	3.9	.333	.357		.7	.3	.0	.0	1.5
Jordan Mickey	2	0	9.0	.400			2.5	.0	.0	.5	2.0

- ^{†} Denotes player spent time with another team in the season. Stats reflect time with the Celtics only.

== Transactions ==
=== Trades ===
June 23, 2016	To Boston Celtics 2019 Second Round Draft Pick	To Memphis Grizzlies Draft rights to Deyonta Davis and Rade Zagorac

=== Re-signed ===
Player	Signed

=== Additions ===
Player	Signed	Former Team
Al Horford	4-year contract worth $113 million	Atlanta Hawks
Gerald Green	1-year contract worth $1.4 million	Miami Heat

=== Subtractions ===
Player	Reason	Current Team
Evan Turner	Signed 4-year contract worth $70 million	Portland Trail Blazers
Jared Sullinger	Waived	(Canada) Toronto Raptors
R. J. Hunter	Waived	Chicago Bulls / Windy City Bulls / Long Island Nets

== Awards ==
Recipient	Award	Date awarded	Ref.
Isaiah Thomas	Eastern Conference Player of the Week	December 26, 2016	
Isaiah Thomas	Eastern Conference Player(s) of the Month (January)	February 2, 2017	
Isaiah Thomas	Eastern Conference Player of the Week	February 6, 2017	
Brad Stevens	Eastern Conference Head Coach	February 3, 2017	
