= Marshall Plumlee =

American basketball player and army officer (born 1992)

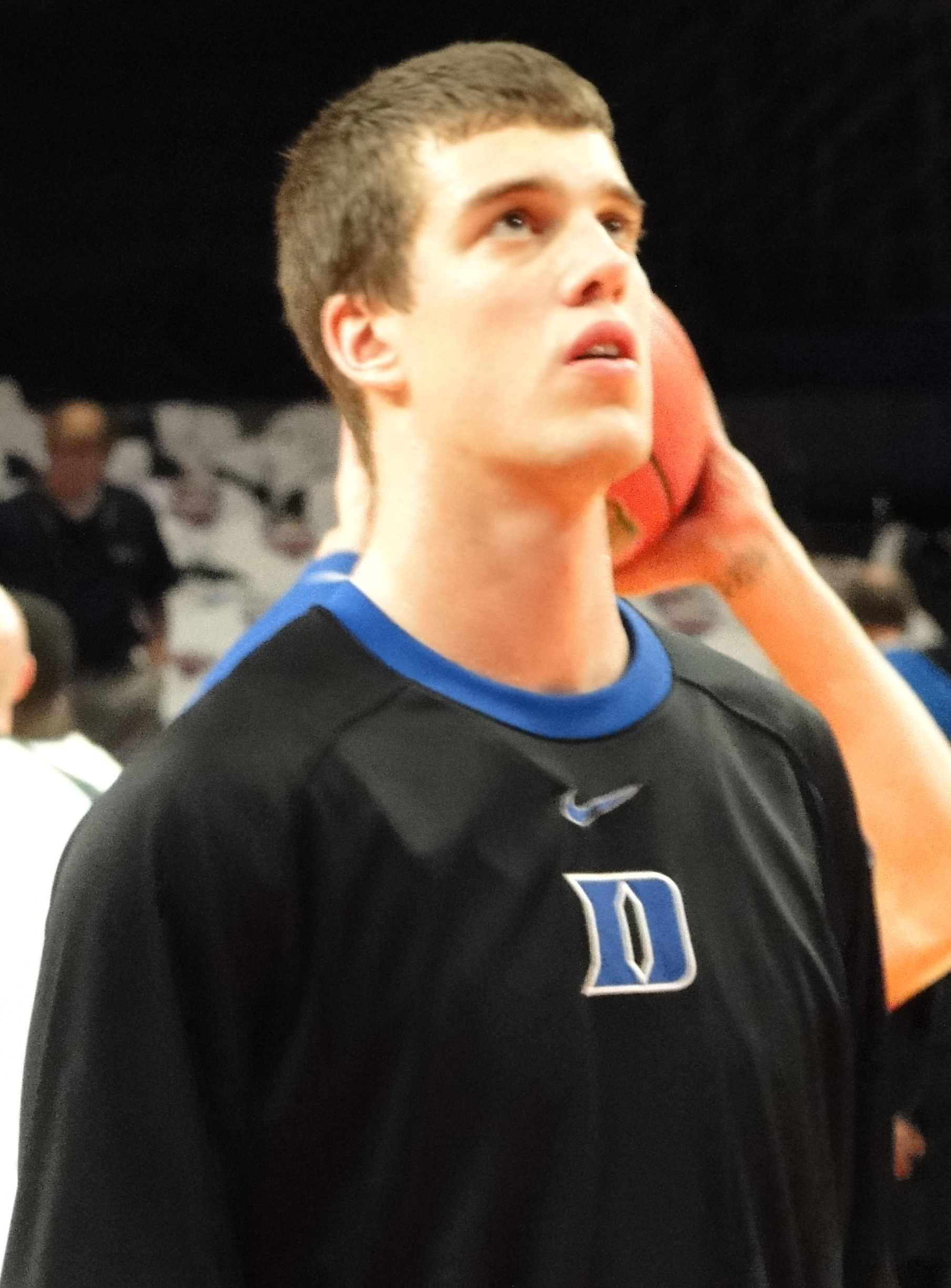
- Plumlee with the Duke Blue Devils in 2011

Personal information
- Born: July 14, 1992 (age 34) West Lafayette, Indiana, U.S.
- Listed height: 7 ft 0 in (2.13 m)
- Listed weight: 250 lb (113 kg)

Career information
- High school: Christ School (Arden, North Carolina)
- College: Duke (2012–2016)
- NBA draft: 2016: undrafted
- Playing career: 2016–2018
- Position: Center
- Number: 40

Career history
- 2016–2017: New York Knicks
- 2016–2017: →Westchester Knicks
- 2017–2018: Agua Caliente Clippers
- 2018: Milwaukee Bucks
- 2018: →Wisconsin Herd

Career highlights
- NCAA champion (2015); McDonald's All-American (2011)
- Stats at NBA.com
- Stats at Basketball Reference
Medals
Men's basketball
Representing United States
FIBA AmeriCup
Gold medal – first place	2017 Argentina

Marshall Harrison Plumlee (born July 14, 1992) is an American former professional basketball player and an active-duty United States Army Ranger-Qualified officer. He played college basketball for the Duke University Blue Devils. He was one of the top-rated basketball recruits in the class of 2011, a McDonald's All-American, and is the younger brother and former high school and college teammate of both Mason and Miles Plumlee.

== High school career ==
A native of Warsaw, Indiana, Plumlee joined his older brothers as boarding students at Christ School in Arden, North Carolina.

During his four years on the basketball team, the Greenies won 139 out of 150 games, winning four consecutive state championships. Plumlee's contribution to the team increased each year. By his junior year, when both his brothers were playing for Duke, Plumlee averaged 8.6 points, 8.0 rebounds, and 2.6 blocks per game.

As a senior, Plumlee averaged 11.5 points, 10.3 rebounds, and 2.5 blocks per game. Following that season, the 6-foot-11-inch (2.11 m) Plumlee was named the Gatorade Player of the Year in North Carolina and named to the 2011 McDonald's All-American Game.

As a senior, Plumlee signed to play for Duke University. Plumlee's five-player recruiting class for Duke in 2011 included Austin Rivers, Alex Murphy, Quinn Cook, and Michael Gbinije. Duke's class was the second-best recruiting class in 2011, according to ESPNU.

== College career ==
In Plumlee's freshman year at Duke, both of his brothers were on the team and Marshall redshirted. He made his debut in 2012–13, but his playing time was limited by a stress fracture in his foot. In Plumlee's junior year (2014–15), he saw limited action, playing 8.5 minutes per game in 30 contests.

By his junior year, Plumlee had developed into a steady inside defender, backing up Jahlil Okafor, a freshman who went on to be the 3rd pick in that year's NBA draft. That 2015 Duke team won the NCAA national championship.

During his final season at Duke, Plumlee served as a team captain along with Amile Jefferson and Matt Jones. Plumlee started all 36 games that year, averaging 8.3 points, 8.6 rebounds, and 1.6 blocked shots per game.

=== College statistics ===
Year	Team	GP	GS	MPG	FG%	3P%	FT%	RPG	APG	SPG	BPG	PPG
2012–13	Duke	19	0	2.6	.125	0.0	0.0	0.6	0.1	0.2	0.2	0.1
2013–14	Duke	30	0	8.5	.552	0.0	.353	2.2	0.3	0.2	0.6	1.3
2014–15	Duke	39	0	9.6	.762	1.00	.710	2.4	0.3	0.2	0.6	2.2
2015–16	Duke	36	36	30.5	.688	0.0	.575	8.6	1.1	0.8	1.6	8.3

== Professional career ==
=== New York Knicks (2016–2017) ===
After going undrafted in the 2016 NBA draft, Plumlee joined the New York Knicks for the 2016 NBA Summer League. On July 8, 2016, he signed with the Knicks. During his rookie season, he had multiple assignments to the Westchester Knicks of the NBA Development League. Plumlee made his NBA debut on November 20, 2016, against the Atlanta Hawks. He was rushed into the city from his D-League assignment when starting center Joakim Noah was sent home due to illness. He gathered a rebound and committed a foul in five minutes of action in a win over the Hawks. On July 7, 2017, he was waived by the Knicks.

=== Agua Caliente Clippers (2017–2018) ===
On September 27, 2017, Plumlee signed with the Los Angeles Clippers. He was waived by the Clippers on October 14, 2017, after appearing in four preseason games. A week later, he was named in the inaugural Agua Caliente Clippers training camp roster. He went on to earn a spot in the team's opening-night roster.

=== Milwaukee Bucks (2018) ===
On January 15, 2018, Plumlee signed a two-way contract with the Milwaukee Bucks. Throughout the season, he split his playing time between the Bucks and their NBA G League affiliate, the Wisconsin Herd.

== National team career ==
Plumlee played with the senior United States national team at the 2017 FIBA AmeriCup, where the team won the gold medal.

== NBA career statistics ==
Legend
GP	Games played	GS	Games started	MPG	Minutes per game
FG%	Field goal percentage	3P%	3-point field goal percentage	FT%	Free throw percentage
RPG	Rebounds per game	APG	Assists per game	SPG	Steals per game
BPG	Blocks per game	PPG	Points per game	**Bold**	Career high

=== Regular season ===
Year	Team	GP	GS	MPG	FG%	3P%	FT%	RPG	APG	SPG	BPG	PPG
2016–17	New York	**21**	**1**	**8.1**	**.533**	–	.421	**2.4**	**.5**	**.2**	**.2**	**1.9**
2017–18	Milwaukee	8	0	6.5	.333	–	**.750**	2.1	.3	.0	.1	1.8
Career		29	1	7.7	.515	–	.571	2.3	.4	.1	.2	1.9

== Military career ==
Plumlee earned a commission into the United States Army as an infantry officer through Duke University's Reserve Officers' Training Corps (ROTC) program. He participated in a ROTC contracting ceremony on January 23, 2015, on the court of Cameron Indoor Stadium. Upon graduating from Duke, Plumlee commissioned into the New York National Guard in 2017, while playing for the New York Knicks.

In 2019, Plumlee graduated from Ranger School, with his mother affixing the Ranger Tab, and transitioned to an active-duty military status. According to Plumlee, his inspiration to serve in the military stemmed from his childhood just as his desire to play professional basketball. General Robert Brooks Brown, a retired commanding general of United States Army Pacific, became a mentor of Plumlee's in high school. Both men played collegiate basketball under coach Mike Krzyzewski.

== Business career ==
In May 2022, Plumlee announced that he would be entering the two-year MBA program at Harvard Business School, joining the HBS class of 2024.

== Personal life ==
Plumlee grew up with brothers Miles and Mason, and they reunited during the 2011–12 basketball season at Duke University; they also have a sister named Madeleine, who played volleyball at the University of Notre Dame. They were only the third trio of brothers to play on the same college basketball team at the same time.

His parents are Millard "Perky" (a former Tennessee Tech basketball player) and Leslie Plumlee (a former Purdue women's basketball player who set the school single-game rebound record with 25). The two met at a basketball camp during the summer of 1979. His grandfather Albert "Bud" Schultz played basketball at Michigan Tech (1944), his uncle William Schultz played basketball at Wisconsin–Eau Claire (1971–72), and his uncle Chad Schultz played basketball at Wisconsin–Oshkosh (1983–86).
