= Plumley (surname) =

Plumley is a surname. Notable people with the surname include:

- Basil L. Plumley (1920–2012), American soldier
- Charles Albert Plumley (1875–1964), American lawyer and politician
- Fee Plumley, British artist and technologist
- Frank Plumley (1844–1924), American politician and lawyer
- Gary Plumley (* 1956), British footballer
- Gavin Plumley (* 1981), British writer and broadcaster
- Jack Plumley (1910 – 1999), British Anglican priest, Egyptologist and academic

== See also ==
- Plumlee, surname
