= 2016–17 Charlotte Hornets season =

NBA professional basketball team season

- Head coach: Steve Clifford
- General manager: Rich Cho
- Owners: Michael Jordan
- Arena: Spectrum Center

Results
- Record: 36–46 (.439)
- Place: Division: 4th (Southeast); Conference: 11th (Eastern)
- Playoff finish: Did not qualify
- Stats at Basketball Reference

Local media
- Television: Fox Sports Carolinas, Fox Sports Southeast
- Radio: WFNZ

The 2016–17 Charlotte Hornets season was the 27th season of the franchise in the National Basketball Association (NBA) and the fourth season under head coach Steve Clifford.

== Off-season ==
The Hornets team store at the Spectrum Center was damaged and looted by rioters during the 2016 Charlotte riot.

== NBA draft ==
Round	Pick	Player	Position	Nationality	School/club team
1	22	Malachi Richardson	SG	United States	Syracuse

== Roster ==
2016–17 Charlotte Hornets roster
Players

Pos.	No.	Player	Height	Weight	DOB	From
SG	5	Nicolas Batum	6 ft 8 in (2.03 m)	200 lb (91 kg)	1988–12–14	France
SG	21	Marco Belinelli	6 ft 5 in (1.96 m)	210 lb (95 kg)	1986–03–25	Italy
SG	12	Treveon Graham	6 ft 6 in (1.98 m)	226 lb (103 kg)	1993–10–28	VCU
C	44	Frank Kaminsky	7 ft 0 in (2.13 m)	240 lb (109 kg)	1993–04–04	Wisconsin
SF	14	Michael Kidd-Gilchrist	6 ft 7 in (2.01 m)	232 lb (105 kg)	1993–09–26	Kentucky
SG	3	Jeremy Lamb	6 ft 5 in (1.96 m)	185 lb (84 kg)	1992–05–30	Connecticut
PF	8	Johnny O'Bryant	6 ft 9 in (2.06 m)	257 lb (117 kg)	1993–06–01	LSU
C	18	Miles Plumlee	6 ft 11 in (2.11 m)	249 lb (113 kg)	1988–09–01	Duke
PG	22	Brian Roberts	6 ft 1 in (1.85 m)	173 lb (78 kg)	1985–12–03	Dayton
PG	7	Ramon Sessions	6 ft 3 in (1.91 m)	190 lb (86 kg)	1986–04–11	Nevada
PG	15	Kemba Walker	6 ft 1 in (1.85 m)	184 lb (83 kg)	1990–05–08	Connecticut
PG	0	Brianté Weber	6 ft 2 in (1.88 m)	165 lb (75 kg)	1992–12–29	VCU
SF	2	Marvin Williams	6 ft 9 in (2.06 m)	237 lb (108 kg)	1986–06–19	North Carolina
PF	35	Christian Wood	6 ft 11 in (2.11 m)	220 lb (100 kg)	1995–09–27	UNLV
PF	40	Cody Zeller	7 ft 0 in (2.13 m)	240 lb (109 kg)	1992–10–05	Indiana

Coaches
Head coach
- Steve Clifford
Assistant(s)
- Patrick Ewing (associate HC)
- Pat Delany
- Steve Hetzel
- Bruce Kreutzer
- Stephen Silas
- Bob Weiss

Legend
- (DP) Unsigned draft pick
- (FA) Free agent
- (S) Suspended
- (DL) On assignment to D-League affiliate
- Injured

Roster
Updated: 2017–04–04

== Game log ==
=== Pre-season ===
2016 pre-season game log
Total: 3–4 (Home: 2–1; Road: 1–3)
Pre-season: 3–4 (home: 2–1; road: 1–3)

Game	Date	Team	Score	High points	High rebounds	High assists	Location Attendance	Record
1	October 3	@ Dallas	L 88–95	Frank Kaminsky III (13)	Roy Hibbert (8)	Hawes, Sessions (4)	American Airlines Center; 19,219	0–1
2	October 6	Boston	L 92–107	Jeremy Lamb (16)	Jeremy Lamb (10)	Spencer Hawes (6)	Greensboro Coliseum; 8,021	0–2
3	October 8	@ Boston	L 86–104	Christian Wood (13)	Frank Kaminsky III (12)	Spencer Hawes (5)	Mohegan Sun Arena; 8,052	0–3
4	October 10	Minnesota	W 98–86	Frank Kaminsky III (17)	Spencer Hawes (11)	Nicolas Batum (5)	Spectrum Center; 8,424	1–3
5	October 17	@ Chicago	W 108–104 (OT)	Belinelli, Kaminsky III (14)	Michael Kidd-Gilchrist (10)	Ramon Sessions (5)	United Center; 20,025	2–3
6	October 20	Miami	W 96–88	Kemba Walker (17)	Michael Kidd-Gilchrist (14)	Kemba Walker (6)	Spectrum Center; 9,127	3–3
7	October 21	@ Minnesota	L 74–109	Marco Belinelli (10)	Jeremy Lamb (9)	Walker, Wood (2)	Target Center; 9,708	3–4

2016–17 season schedule

=== Regular season ===
2016–17 game log
Total: 36–46 (Home: 22–19; Road: 14–27)
October: 2–1 (home: 0–1; road: 2–0)

Game	Date	Team	Score	High points	High rebounds	High assists	Location Attendance	Record
1	October 26	@ Milwaukee	W 107–96	Michael Kidd-Gilchrist (23)	Michael Kidd-Gilchrist (14)	Kemba Walker (8)	BMO Harris Bradley Center; 18,717	1–0
2	October 28	@ Miami	W 97–91	Kemba Walker (24)	Marvin Williams (11)	Walker, Batum, Sessions (4)	American Airlines Arena; 19,600	2–0
3	October 29	Boston	L 98–104	Kemba Walker (29)	Cody Zeller (9)	Nicolas Batum (6)	Spectrum Center; 18,708	2–1

November : 8–7 (home: 5–4; road: 3–3)

Game	Date	Team	Score	High points	High rebounds	High assists	Location Attendance	Record
4	November 2	Philadelphia	W 109–93	Kemba Walker (22)	Michael Kidd-Gilchrist (13)	Kemba Walker (7)	Spectrum Center; 15,275	3–1
5	November 4	@ Brooklyn	W 99–95	Kemba Walker (30)	Michael Kidd-Gilchrist (10)	Cody Zeller (6)	Barclays Center; 15,775	4–1
6	November 7	Indiana	W 122–100	Kemba Walker (24)	Spencer Hawes (13)	Kemba Walker (10)	Spectrum Center; 16,880	5–1
7	November 9	Utah	W 104–98	Kemba Walker (21)	Michael Kidd-Gilchrist (9)	Kemba Walker (6)	Spectrum Center; 15,712	6–1
8	November 11	Toronto	L 111–113	Kemba Walker (40)	Batum, Walker (10)	Batum, Walker (6)	Spectrum Center; 18,107	6–2
9	November 13	@ Cleveland	L 93–100	Kemba Walker (21)	Michael Kidd-Gilchrist (10)	Nicholas Batum (7)	Quicken Loans Arena; 20,562	6–3
10	November 15	@ Minnesota	W 115–108	Kemba Walker (30)	Cody Zeller (9)	Nicholas Batum (7)	Target Center; 10,349	7–3
11	November 18	Atlanta	W 100–96	Nicolas Batum (24)	Marvin Williams (11)	Kemba Walker (6)	Spectrum Center; 17,989	8–3
12	November 19	@ New Orleans	L 116–121 (OT)	Kemba Walker (25)	Michael Kidd-Gilchrist (13)	Ramon Sessions (9)	Smoothie King Center; 15,739	8–4
13	November 21	Memphis	L 94–106	Frank Kaminsky (23)	Michael Kidd-Gilchrist (10)	Nicolas Batum (5)	Spectrum Center; 14,181	8–5
14	November 23	San Antonio	L 114–119	Kemba Walker (26)	Kemba Walker (9)	Kemba Walker (7)	Spectrum Center; 18,515	8–6
15	November 25	@ New York	L 111–113 (OT)	Marco Belinelli (19)	Batum, Kaminsky (9)	Nicolas Batum (8)	Madison Square Garden; 19,812	8–7
16	November 26	New York	W 107–102	Kemba Walker (28)	Jeremy Lamb (17)	Kaminsky, Sessions, Walker (3)	Spectrum Center; 19,195	9–7
17	November 28	@ Memphis	W 104–85	Lamb, Walker (21)	Jeremy Lamb (9)	Spencer Hawes (6)	FedEx Forum; 13,143	10–7
18	November 29	Detroit	L 89–112	Kemba Walker (23)	Nicolas Batum (11)	Nicolas Batum (5)	Spectrum Center; 14,266	10–8

December : 9–7 (home: 6–2; road: 3–5)

Game	Date	Team	Score	High points	High rebounds	High assists	Location Attendance	Record
19	December 1	Dallas	W 97–87	Kemba Walker (18)	Nicolas Batum (9)	Nicolas Batum (6)	Spectrum Center; 14,471	11–8
20	December 3	Minnesota	L 120–125 (OT)	Kemba Walker (22)	Kaminsky, Zeller (9)	Nicolas Batum (12)	Spectrum Center; 16,982	11–9
21	December 5	@ Dallas	W 109–101	Kemba Walker (19)	Nicolas Batum (15)	Nicolas Batum (7)	American Airlines Center; 19,228	12–9
22	December 7	Detroit	W 87–77	Kemba Walker (25)	Nicolas Batum (15)	Kemba Walker (4)	Spectrum Center; 15,141	13–9
23	December 9	Orlando	W 109–88	Batum, Kidd-Gilchrist (16)	Kaminsky, Batum (9)	Nicolas Batum (7)	Spectrum Center; 15,707	14–9
24	December 10	@ Cleveland	L 105–116	Kemba Walker (24)	Cody Zeller (9)	Kaminsky, Walker (5)	Quicken Loans Arena; 20,562	14–10
25	December 12	@ Indiana	L 94–110	Marco Belinelli (14)	Kidd-Gilchrist, Batum (10)	Kemba Walker (5)	Bankers Life Fieldhouse; 14,138	14–11
26	December 14	@ Washington	L 106–109	Nicolas Batum (20)	Hibbert, Walker (5)	Kemba Walker (9)	Verizon Center; 13,447	14–12
27	December 16	@ Boston	L 88–96	Nicolas Batum (22)	Zeller, Batum (10)	Ramon Sessions (6)	TD Garden; 18,624	14–13
28	December 17	@ Atlanta	W 107–99	Marvin Williams (19)	Cody Zeller (11)	Kemba Walker (10)	Philips Arena; 17,918	15–13
29	December 20	L.A Lakers	W 117–113	Kemba Walker (18)	Michael Kidd-Gilchrist (11)	Batum, Walker (10)	Spectrum Center; 19,093	16–13
30	December 23	Chicago	W 103–91	Batum, Walker (20)	Nicolas Batum (11)	Nicolas Batum (10)	Spectrum Center; 19,249	17–13
31	December 26	@ Brooklyn	L 118–120	Nicolas Batum (24)	Michael Kidd-Gilchrist (10)	Kemba Walker (6)	Barclays Center; 17,732	17–14
32	December 28	@ Orlando	W 120–101	Kemba Walker (21)	Nicolas Batum (9)	Nicolas Batum (8)	Amway Center; 18,273	18–14
33	December 29	Miami	W 91–82	Kemba Walker (22)	Nicolas Batum (13)	Nicolas Batum (8)	Spectrum Center; 19,471	19–14
34	December 31	Cleveland	L 109–121	Kemba Walker (37)	Michael Kidd-Gilchrist (8)	Nicolas Batum (8)	Spectrum Center; 19,519	19–15

January : 4–11 (home: 4–3; road: 0–8)

Game	Date	Team	Score	High points	High rebounds	High assists	Location Attendance	Record
35	January 2	@ Chicago	L 111–118	Kemba Walker (34)	Kemba Walker (11)	Nicolas Batum (5)	United Center; 21,612	19–16
36	January 4	Oklahoma City	W 123–112	Nicolas Batum (28)	Michael Kidd-Gilchrist (11)	Kemba Walker (9)	Spectrum Center; 18,418	20–16
37	January 5	@ Detroit	L 114–115	Kemba Walker (32)	Michael Kidd-Gilchrist (13)	Batum, Walker (5)	Palace of Auburn Hills; 13,723	20–17
38	January 7	@ San Antonio	L 85–102	Kemba Walker (18)	Kidd-Gilchrist, Zeller (9)	Walker, Lamb (3)	AT&T Center; 18,418	20–18
39	January 10	@ Houston	L 114–121	Kemba Walker (25)	Marvin Williams (8)	Kemba Walker (10)	Toyota Center; 16,196	20–19
40	January 13	@ Philadelphia	L 93–102	Nicolas Batum (19)	Michael Kidd-Gilchrist (12)	Michael Kidd-Gilchrist (4)	Wells Fargo Center; 18,215	20–20
41	January 16	@ Boston	L 98–108	Kemba Walker (24)	Nicolas Batum (10)	Nicolas Batum (10)	TD Garden; 18,624	20–21
42	January 18	Portland	W 107–85	Kemba Walker (23)	Cody Zeller (10)	Nicolas Batum (7)	Spectrum Center; 15,451	21–21
43	January 20	Toronto	W 113–78	Kemba Walker (32)	Michael Kidd-Gilchrist (11)	Kemba Walker (8)	Spectrum Center; 18,378	22–21
44	January 21	Brooklyn	W 112–105	Michael Kidd-Gilchrist (17)	Michael Kidd-Gilchrist (14)	Batum, Walker (6)	Spectrum Center; 18,583	23–21
45	January 23	Washington	L 99–109	Kemba Walker (21)	Cody Zeller (9)	Nicholas Batum (6)	Spectrum Center; 15,285	23–22
46	January 25	Golden State	L 103–113	Kemba Walker (26)	Spencer Hawes (12)	Batum, Walker (8)	Spectrum Center; 19,077	23–23
47	January 27	@ New York	L 107–110	Kemba Walker (31)	Nicolas Batum (11)	Nicolas Batum (9)	Madison Square Garden; 19,812	23–24
48	January 28	Sacramento	L 106–109	Kemba Walker (26)	Nicolas Batum (7)	Batum, Walker (7)	Spectrum Center; 18,597	23–25
49	January 31	@ Portland	L 98–115	Kemba Walker (22)	Nicolas Batum (8)	Nicolas Batum (6)	Moda Center; 19,393	23–26

February : 3–8 (home: 1–3; road: 2–5)

Game	Date	Team	Score	High points	High rebounds	High assists	Location Attendance	Record
50	February 1	@ Golden State	L 111–126	Frank Kaminsky (24)	Michael Kidd-Gilchrist (9)	Batum, Belinelli (7)	Oracle Arena; 19,596	23–27
51	February 4	@ Utah	L 98–105	Kemba Walker (18)	Marvin Williams (12)	Batum, Walker (6)	Vivint Smart Home Arena; 19,911	23–28
52	February 7	Brooklyn	W 111–107	Batum, Walker, Belinelli (17)	Frank Kaminsky (11)	Kaminsky, Walker (5)	Spectrum Center; 15,322	24–28
53	February 9	Houston	L 95–107	Nicolas Batum (15)	Michael Kidd-Gilchrist (9)	Nicolas Batum (10)	Spectrum Center; 16,270	24–29
54	February 11	L.A Clippers	L 102–107	Nicolas Batum (25)	Frank Kaminsky (8)	Nicolas Batum (8)	Spectrum Center; 19,483	24–30
55	February 13	Philadelphia	L 99–105	Kemba Walker (29)	Frank Kaminsky (11)	Belinelli, Batum (4)	Spectrum Center; 15,775	24–31
56	February 15	@ Toronto	L 85–90	Frank Kaminsky (27)	Michael Kidd-Gilchrist (14)	Kemba Walker (9)	Air Canada Centre; 19,800	24–32
All-Star Break
57	February 23	@ Detroit	L 108–114 (OT)	Kemba Walker (34)	Michael Kidd-Gilchrist (14)	Kemba Walker (6)	The Palace of Auburn Hills; 14,913	24–33
58	February 25	@ Sacramento	W 99–85	Frank Kaminsky (25)	Frank Kaminsky (13)	Kemba Walker (6)	Golden 1 Center; 17,608	25–33
59	February 26	@ L.A Clippers	L 121–124	Kemba Walker (34)	Nicolas Batum (8)	Batum, Kaminsky (4)	Staples Center; 19,060	25–34
60	February 28	@ L.A Lakers	W 109–104	Kemba Walker (30)	Frank Kaminsky (12)	Kemba Walker (7)	Staples Center; 18,997	26–34

March : 9–7 (home: 6–4; road: 3–3)

Game	Date	Team	Score	High points	High rebounds	High assists	Location Attendance	Record
61	March 2	@ Phoenix	L 103–120	Kemba Walker (26)	Kidd-Gilchrist, Zeller (8)	Kemba Walker (8)	Talking Stick Resort Arena; 16,572	26–35
62	March 4	@ Denver	W 112–102	Kemba Walker (27)	Marvin Williams (12)	Nicolas Batum (8)	Pepsi Center; 14,708	27–35
63	March 6	Indiana	W 100–88	Kemba Walker (28)	Michael Kidd-Gilchrist (13)	Kemba Walker (7)	Spectrum Center; 16,387	28–35
64	March 8	@ Miami	L 101–108	Kemba Walker (33)	Marvin Williams (12)	Marvin Williams (3)	American Airlines Arena; 19,600	28–36
65	March 10	Orlando	W 121–81	Kemba Walker (23)	Marvin Williams (18)	Nicolas Batum (10)	Spectrum Center; 17,444	29–36
66	March 11	New Orleans	L 122–125 (OT)	Batum, Walker (24)	Marvin Williams (10)	Kemba Walker (12)	Spectrum Center; 18,196	29–37
67	March 13	Chicago	L 109–115	Jeremy Lamb (26)	Marvin Williams (18)	Kemba Walker (10)	Spectrum Center; 16,489	29–38
68	March 15	@ Indiana	L 77–98	Frank Kaminsky (20)	Jeremy Lamb (7)	Kemba Walker (4)	Bankers Life Fieldhouse; 14,169	29–39
69	March 18	Washington	W 98–93	Cody Zeller (19)	Nicolas Batum (10)	Kemba Walker (6)	Spectrum Center; 19,361	30–39
70	March 20	Atlanta	W 105–90	Batum, Walker (16)	Marvin Williams (8)	Nicolas Batum (6)	Spectrum Center; 14,278	31–39
71	March 22	@ Orlando	W 109–102	Kemba Walker (22)	Marvin Williams (10)	Kemba Walker (7)	Amway Center; 16,034	32–39
72	March 24	Cleveland	L 105–112	Kemba Walker (28)	Williams, Zeller (11)	Kemba Walker (5)	Spectrum Center; 19,511	32–40
73	March 26	Phoenix	W 120–106	Kemba Walker (31)	Kaminsky, Williams, Zeller (7)	Nicolas Batum (10)	Spectrum Center; 17,292	33–40
74	March 28	Milwaukee	L 108–118	Kemba Walker (28)	Marvin Williams (7)	Belinelli, Walker (5)	Spectrum Center; 16,505	33–41
75	March 29	@ Toronto	W 110–106	Marco Belinelli (21)	Marvin Williams (12)	Marco Belinelli (5)	Air Canada Centre; 19,800	34–41
76	March 31	Denver	W 121–114	Kemba Walker (31)	Cody Zeller (9)	Nicolas Batum (9)	Spectrum Center; 18,353	35–41

April : 1–5 (home: 0–2; road: 1–3)

Game	Date	Team	Score	High points	High rebounds	High assists	Location Attendance	Record
77	April 2	@ Oklahoma City	W 113–101	Kemba Walker (29)	Nicolas Batum (7)	Nicolas Batum (8)	Chesapeake Energy Arena; 18,203	36–41
78	April 4	@ Washington	L 111–118	Kemba Walker (37)	Cody Zeller (10)	Nicolas Batum (8)	Verizon Center; 18,614	36–42
79	April 5	Miami	L 99–112	Nicolas Batum (24)	Marvin Williams (12)	Nicolas Batum (7)	Spectrum Center; 17,758	36–43
80	April 8	Boston	L 114–121	Nicolas Batum (31)	Cody Zeller (9)	Kemba Walker (8)	Spectrum Center; 19,407	36–44
81	April 10	@ Milwaukee	L 79–89	Michael Kidd-Gilchrist (13)	Miles Plumlee (7)	Nicolas Batum (8)	BMO Harris Bradley Center; 18,717	36–45
82	April 11	@ Atlanta	L 76–103	Jeremy Lamb (21)	Miles Plumlee (7)	Nicolas Batum (4)	Philips Arena; 14,205	36–46

2016–17 season schedule

== Standings ==
Southeast Division	W	L	PCT	GB	Home	Road	Div	GP
y – Washington Wizards	49	33	.598	–	30‍–‍11	19‍–‍22	8–8	82
x – Atlanta Hawks	43	39	.524	6.0	23‍–‍18	20‍–‍21	6–10	82
Miami Heat	41	41	.500	8.0	23‍–‍18	18‍–‍23	9–7	82
Charlotte Hornets	36	46	.439	13.0	22‍–‍19	14‍–‍27	10–6	82
Orlando Magic	29	53	.354	20.0	16‍–‍25	13‍–‍28	7–9	82

Eastern Conference
#	Team	W	L	PCT	GB	GP
1	c – Boston Celtics *	53	29	.646	–	82
2	y – Cleveland Cavaliers *	51	31	.622	2.0	82
3	x – Toronto Raptors	51	31	.622	2.0	82
4	y – Washington Wizards *	49	33	.598	4.0	82
5	x – Atlanta Hawks	43	39	.524	10.0	82
6	x – Milwaukee Bucks	42	40	.512	11.0	82
7	x – Indiana Pacers	42	40	.512	11.0	82
8	x – Chicago Bulls	41	41	.500	12.0	82
9	Miami Heat	41	41	.500	12.0	82
10	Detroit Pistons	37	45	.451	16.0	82
11	Charlotte Hornets	36	46	.439	17.0	82
12	New York Knicks	31	51	.378	22.0	82
13	Orlando Magic	29	53	.354	24.0	82
14	Philadelphia 76ers	28	54	.341	25.0	82
15	Brooklyn Nets	20	62	.244	33.0	82

== Player statistics ==
=== Regular season ===
Player	POS	GP	GS	MP	REB	AST	STL	BLK	PTS	MPG	RPG	APG	SPG	BPG	PPG
Michael Kidd-Gilchrist	SF	81	81	2,349	565	114	81	77	743	29.0	7.0	1.4	1.0	1.0	9.2
Kemba Walker	PG	79	79	2,739	308	434	85	22	1,830	34.7	3.9	5.5	1.1	.3	23.2
Nicolas Batum	SG	77	77	2,617	481	456	86	29	1,164	34.0	6.2	5.9	1.1	.4	15.1
Marvin Williams	PF	76	76	2,295	500	106	58	53	849	30.2	6.6	1.4	.8	.7	11.2
Frank Kaminsky	C	75	16	1,954	336	162	46	34	874	26.1	4.5	2.2	.6	.5	11.7
Marco Belinelli	SG	74	0	1,778	178	147	44	9	780	24.0	2.4	2.0	.6	.1	10.5
Cody Zeller	C	62	58	1,725	405	99	62	58	639	27.8	6.5	1.6	1.0	.9	10.3
Jeremy Lamb	SG	62	5	1,143	264	75	27	23	603	18.4	4.3	1.2	.4	.4	9.7
Ramon Sessions	PG	50	1	811	73	129	27	3	312	16.2	1.5	2.6	.5	.1	6.2
Roy Hibbert^{†}	C	42	13	671	150	20	8	44	217	16.0	3.6	.5	.2	1.0	5.2
Brian Roberts	PG	41	2	416	39	52	9	1	142	10.1	1.0	1.3	.2	.0	3.5
Spencer Hawes^{†}	PF	35	1	626	146	62	13	26	254	17.9	4.2	1.8	.4	.7	7.3
Treveon Graham	SG	27	1	189	22	6	6	1	57	7.0	.8	.2	.2	.0	2.1
Miles Plumlee^{†}	C	13	0	174	42	3	7	4	31	13.4	3.2	.2	.5	.3	2.4
Brianté Weber^{†}	PG	13	0	159	22	16	9	0	50	12.2	1.7	1.2	.7	.0	3.8
Christian Wood	PF	13	0	107	29	2	3	6	35	8.2	2.2	.2	.2	.5	2.7
Aaron Harrison	SG	5	0	17	3	3	0	0	1	3.4	.6	.6	.0	.0	.2
Johnny O'Bryant III^{†}	PF	4	0	34	8	4	0	0	18	8.5	2.0	1.0	.0	.0	4.5
Mike Tobey	C	2	0	25	3	1	0	0	2	12.5	1.5	.5	.0	.0	1.0

- ^{†} Denotes player spent time with another team in the season. Stats reflect time with the Hornets only.

== Transactions ==
=== Re-signed ===
Player	Signed
Nicolas Batum	5-year contract worth $120 million
Marvin Williams	4-year contract worth $54 million

==== Additions ====
Player	Signed	Former team
Roy Hibbert	1-year contract worth $5 million	Los Angeles Lakers
Ramon Sessions	2-year contract worth $12.5 million	Washington Wizards
Christian Wood	2-year contract worth $1,889,382	Philadelphia 76ers
Brian Roberts	1-year contract worth $1 million	Portland Trail Blazers

==== Subtractions ====
Player	Reason left	New team
Al Jefferson	3-year contract worth $30 million	Indiana Pacers
Jeremy Lin	3-year contract worth $36 million	Brooklyn Nets
Courtney Lee	4-year contract worth $50 million	New York Knicks
