= 2016–17 Memphis Grizzlies season =

- Head coach: David Fizdale
- General manager: Chris Wallace
- Owners: Robert Pera
- Arena: FedExForum

Results
- Record: 43–39 (.524)
- Place: Division: 3rd (Southwest); Conference: 7th (Western)
- Playoff finish: First Round (lost to Spurs 2–4)
- Stats at Basketball Reference

Local media
- Television: Fox Sports Tennessee; Fox Sports Southeast
- Radio: WMFS-FM

The 2016–17 Memphis Grizzlies season was the 22nd season of the franchise in the National Basketball Association (NBA). On May 7, 2016, the Memphis Grizzlies fired Dave Joerger after the team was swept in the first round of the playoffs. On May 29, 2016, David Fizdale was hired as the head coach.

The Grizzlies finished the regular season with a 43–39 record, securing the 7th seed. In the playoffs, they faced off against the San Antonio Spurs in the First Round, where they lost in six games. Following the season, Zach Randolph signed as a free agent with the Sacramento Kings, along with Vince Carter. Tony Allen also left the team following the season, signing with the New Orleans Pelicans as a free agent.

Until the 2020-21 NBA season, this marked the last time the Grizzlies made the playoffs.

== Draft ==
Round	Pick	Player	Position	Nationality	College / Club
1	17	Wade Baldwin IV	PG	United States	Vanderbilt
2	57	Wang Zhelin	C	China	Fujian Sturgeons (China)

== Roster ==
2016–17 Memphis Grizzlies roster
Players

Pos.	No.	Player	Height	Weight	DOB	From
SG	9	Tony Allen	6 ft 4 in (1.93 m)	213 lb (97 kg)	1982-01-11	Oklahoma State
PG	4	Wade Baldwin	6 ft 4 in (1.93 m)	202 lb (92 kg)	1996-03-29	Vanderbilt
SF	15	Vince Carter	6 ft 6 in (1.98 m)	220 lb (100 kg)	1977-01-26	North Carolina
PG	11	Mike Conley	6 ft 1 in (1.85 m)	175 lb (79 kg)	1987-10-11	Ohio State
SG	30	Troy Daniels	6 ft 4 in (1.93 m)	205 lb (93 kg)	1991-07-15	VCU
C	23	Deyonta Davis	6 ft 11 in (2.11 m)	240 lb (109 kg)	1996-12-02	Michigan State
SF	8	James Ennis	6 ft 7 in (2.01 m)	210 lb (95 kg)	1990-07-01	Long Beach State
C	33	Marc Gasol	7 ft 1 in (2.16 m)	255 lb (116 kg)	1985-01-29	Lausanne CS (TN)
PF	0	JaMychal Green	6 ft 9 in (2.06 m)	227 lb (103 kg)	1990-06-21	Alabama
SG	5	Andrew Harrison	6 ft 6 in (1.98 m)	213 lb (97 kg)	1994-10-28	Kentucky
PF	1	Jarell Martin	6 ft 10 in (2.08 m)	239 lb (108 kg)	1994-05-24	LSU
SF	25	Chandler Parsons	6 ft 10 in (2.08 m)	230 lb (104 kg)	1988-10-25	Florida
PF	50	Zach Randolph	6 ft 9 in (2.06 m)	260 lb (118 kg)	1981-07-16	Michigan State
SG	7	Wayne Selden	6 ft 5 in (1.96 m)	230 lb (104 kg)	1994-09-30	Kansas
PF	34	Brandan Wright	6 ft 10 in (2.08 m)	215 lb (98 kg)	1987-10-05	North Carolina

Coaches
Head coach
- David Fizdale
Assistant(s)
- Bob Bender
- Adam Mazarei
- Keith Smart
- Nick Van Exel
- J. B. Bickerstaff (associate HC)

Legend
- (DP) Unsigned draft pick
- (FA) Free agent
- (S) Suspended
- (DL) On assignment to D-League affiliate
- Injured

Roster
Updated: 2017-04-03

== Standings ==
=== Division ===
Southwest Division	W	L	PCT	GB	Home	Road	Div	GP
y – San Antonio Spurs	61	21	.744	–	31‍–‍10	30‍–‍11	11–5	82
x – Houston Rockets	55	27	.671	6.0	30‍–‍11	25‍–‍16	10–6	82
x – Memphis Grizzlies	43	39	.524	18.0	24‍–‍17	19‍–‍22	8–8	82
e – New Orleans Pelicans	34	48	.415	27.0	21‍–‍20	13‍–‍28	6–10	82
e – Dallas Mavericks	33	49	.402	28.0	21‍–‍20	12‍–‍29	5–11	82

=== Conference ===
Western Conference
#	Team	W	L	PCT	GB	GP
1	z – Golden State Warriors *	67	15	.817	–	82
2	y – San Antonio Spurs *	61	21	.744	6.0	82
3	x – Houston Rockets	55	27	.671	12.0	82
4	x – Los Angeles Clippers	51	31	.622	16.0	82
5	y – Utah Jazz *	51	31	.622	16.0	82
6	x – Oklahoma City Thunder	47	35	.573	20.0	82
7	x – Memphis Grizzlies	43	39	.524	24.0	82
8	x – Portland Trail Blazers	41	41	.500	26.0	82
9	e – Denver Nuggets	40	42	.488	27.0	82
10	e – New Orleans Pelicans	34	48	.415	33.0	82
11	e – Dallas Mavericks	33	49	.402	34.0	82
12	e – Sacramento Kings	32	50	.390	35.0	82
13	e – Minnesota Timberwolves	31	51	.378	36.0	82
14	e – Los Angeles Lakers	26	56	.317	41.0	82
15	e – Phoenix Suns	24	58	.293	43.0	82

== Game log ==
=== Pre-season ===
2016 pre-season game log
Total: 4–2 (home: 2–1; road: 2–1)
Pre-season: 4–2 (home: 2–1; road: 2–1)

Game	Date	Team	Score	High points	High rebounds	High assists	Location Attendance	Record
1	October 3	Orlando	W 102–97	Wade Baldwin IV (15)	Ennis, Randolph, Stephens (5)	Andrew Harrison (6)	FedExForum; 18,119	1–0
2	October 6	Atlanta	L 83–104	Troy Williams (15)	D.J. Stephens (8)	Wade Baldwin IV (4)	FedExForum; 13,246	1–1
3	October 11	Philadelphia	W 121–91	Troy Williams (21)	JaMychal Green (11)	Mike Conley Jr. (6)	FedExForum; 14,248	2–1
4	October 13	@ Oklahoma City	W 110–94	Marc Gasol (21)	Zach Randolph (8)	Mike Conley Jr. (7)	BOK Center (Tulsa); 17,022	3–1
5	October 15	@ Houston	W 134–125 (2OT)	Troy Williams (23)	Vince Hunter (10)	Mike Conley Jr. (7)	Target Center; 14,690	4–1
6	October 19	@ Minnesota	L 94–101	Wayne Selden Jr. (17)	Zach Randolph (9)	Crawford, Selden Jr. (3)	Toyota Center; 9,594	4–2

2016–17 pre-season schedule

=== Regular season ===
2016–17 game log
Total: 43–39 (home: 24–17; road: 19–22)
October: 2–1 (home: 2–0; road: 0–1)

Game	Date	Team	Score	High points	High rebounds	High assists	Location Attendance	Record
1	October 26	Minnesota	W 102–98	Mike Conley Jr. (24)	Zach Randolph (11)	Wade Baldwin IV (6)	FedExForum; 18,119	1–0
2	October 29	@ New York	L 104–111	Marc Gasol (20)	JaMychal Green (8)	Mike Conley Jr. (5)	Madison Square Garden; 19,812	1–1
3	October 30	Washington	W 112–103 (OT)	Mike Conley Jr. (24)	James Ennis (12)	Mike Conley Jr. (11)	FedExForum; 15,573	2–1

November : 9–7 (home: 3–4; road: 6–3)

Game	Date	Team	Score	High points	High rebounds	High assists	Location Attendance	Record
4	November 1	@ Minnesota	L 80–116	Deyonta Davis (17)	Deyonta Davis (6)	Andrew Harrison (5)	Target Center; 14,774	2–2
5	November 2	New Orleans	W 89–83 (OT)	JaMychal Green (21)	Marc Gasol (10)	Marc Gasol (6)	FedExForum; 15,881	3–2
6	November 4	L. A. Clippers	L 88–99	Mike Conley Jr. (30)	James Ennis (11)	Mike Conley Jr. (10)	FedExForum; 17,115	3–3
7	November 6	Portland	L 94–100	Marc Gasol (21)	JaMychal Green (8)	Mike Conley Jr. (7)	FedExForum; 16,233	3–4
8	November 8	Denver	W 108–107	Vince Carter (20)	Zach Randolph (8)	Mike Conley Jr. (7)	FedExForum; 15,109	4–4
9	November 12	@ Milwaukee	L 96–106	Marc Gasol (18)	Zach Randolph (7)	Marc Gasol (6)	BMO Harris Bradley Center; 14,327	4–5
10	November 14	@ Utah	W 102–96	Marc Gasol (22)	Zach Randolph (10)	Mike Conley Jr. (8)	Vivint Smart Home Arena; 18,176	5–5
11	November 16	@ L.A. Clippers	W 111–107	Mike Conley Jr. (30)	JaMychal Green (10)	Mike Conley Jr. (8)	Staples Center; 19,060	6–5
12	November 18	@ Dallas	W 80–64	Chandler Parsons (12)	JaMychal Green (12)	James Ennis (4)	American Airlines Center; 19,715	7–5
13	November 19	Minnesota	W 93–71	JaMychal Green (19)	JaMychal Green (8)	Andrew Harrison (7)	FedExForum; 17,112	8–5
14	November 21	@ Charlotte	W 106–94	Mike Conley Jr. (31)	Randolph, Gasol, Green (8)	Marc Gasol (9)	Spectrum Center; 14,181	9–5
15	November 23	@ Philadelphia	W 104–99 (2OT)	Marc Gasol (27)	JaMychal Green (11)	Mike Conley Jr. (9)	Wells Fargo Center; 15,880	10–5
16	November 25	Miami	L 81–90	Mike Conley Jr. (16)	Jarell Martin (12)	Andrew Harrison (7)	FedExForum; 17,222	10–6
17	November 26	@ Miami	W 110–107	Marc Gasol (28)	Tony Allen (8)	Mike Conley Jr. (7)	American Airlines Arena; 19,600	11–6
18	November 28	Charlotte	L 85–104	Marc Gasol (19)	Jarell Martin (12)	Mike Conley Jr. (5)	FedExForum; 13,143	11–7
19	November 30	@ Toronto	L 105–120	Andrew Harrison (21)	Marc Gasol (8)	Andrew Harrison (4)	Air Canada Centre; 19,800	11–8

December : 11–6 (home: 8–3; road: 3–3)

Game	Date	Team	Score	High points	High rebounds	High assists	Location Attendance	Record
20	December 1	Orlando	W 95–94	Marc Gasol (25)	Jarell Martin (10)	Andrew Harrison (8)	FedExForum; 13,344	12–8
21	December 3	L. A. Lakers	W 103–100	Troy Daniels (31)	JaMychal Green (13)	Marc Gasol (8)	FedExForum; 17,017	13–8
22	December 5	@ New Orleans	W 110–108 (2OT)	Troy Daniels (29)	JaMychal Green (15)	Marc Gasol (11)	Smoothie King Center; 13,795	14–8
23	December 6	Philadelphia	W 96–91	Marc Gasol (26)	Zach Randolph (14)	Andrew Harrison (4)	FedEx Forum; 13,521	15–8
24	December 8	Portland	W 88–86	Marc Gasol (36)	JaMychal Green (18)	Harrison, Douglas (3)	FedExForum; 14,317	16–8
25	December 10	Golden State	W 110–89	Gasol, Allen (19)	JaMychal Green (10)	Marc Gasol (6)	FedExForum; 18,119	17−8
26	December 13	@ Cleveland	L 86–103	Zach Randolph (18)	Jarell Martin (10)	Andrew Harrison (4)	Quicken Loans Arena; 20,562	17–9
27	December 14	Cleveland	W 93–85	Troy Daniels (20)	Marc Gasol (11)	Toney Douglas (5)	FedEx Forum; 17,449	18–9
28	December 16	Sacramento	L 92–96	Marc Gasol (20)	Allen, Randolph (9)	Mike Conley Jr. (6)	FedExForum; 15,987	18–10
29	December 18	Utah	L 73–82	Mike Conley Jr. (14)	Green, Randolph (11)	Conley Jr., Gasol (4)	FedExForum; 15,862	18–11
30	December 20	Boston	L 109–112 (OT)	Daniels, Gasol (24)	JaMychal Green (12)	Mike Conley Jr. (8)	FedExForum; 16,519	18–12
31	December 21	@ Detroit	W 98–86	Marc Gasol (38)	JaMychal Green (9)	Andrew Harrison (6)	The Palace of Auburn Hills; 16,033	19–12
32	December 23	Houston	W 115–109	Mike Conley Jr. (24)	Green, Gasol, Randolph (5)	Andrew Harrison (6)	FedExForum; 17,454	20–12
33	December 26	@ Orlando	L 102–112	Mike Conley Jr. (17)	Jarell Martin (8)	Mike Conley Jr. (4)	Amway Center; 17,104	20–13
34	December 27	@ Boston	L 103–113	Marc Gasol (26)	Zach Randolph (10)	Marc Gasol (9)	TD Garden; 18,624	20–14
35	December 29	Oklahoma City	W 114–80	Marc Gasol (25)	Tony Allen (9)	Baldwin IV, Carter (4)	FedEx Forum; 18,119	21–14
36	December 31	@ Sacramento	W 112–98	Mike Conley Jr. (22)	Mike Conley Jr. (8)	Andrew Harrison (6)	Golden 1 Center; 17,608	22–14

January : 7–7 (home: 3–2; road: 4–5)

Game	Date	Team	Score	High points	High rebounds	High assists	Location Attendance	Record
37	January 3	@ L. A. Lakers	L 102–116	Marc Gasol (22)	Zach Randolph (9)	Marc Gasol (7)	Staples Center; 18,997	22–15
38	January 4	@ L. A. Clippers	L 106–115	Marc Gasol (23)	Conley Jr., Carter (7)	Mike Conley Jr. (12)	Staples Center; 19,060	22–16
39	January 6	@ Golden State	W 128–119 (OT)	Mike Conley Jr. (27)	Tony Allen (12)	Mike Conley Jr. (12)	Oracle Arena; 19,596	23−16
40	January 8	Utah	W 88–79	Mike Conley Jr. (19)	Zach Randolph (11)	Mike Conley Jr. (9)	FedExForum; 16,112	24−16
41	January 11	@ Oklahoma City	L 95–103	Mike Conley Jr. (22)	JaMychal Green (10)	Marc Gasol (7)	Chesapeake Energy Arena; 11,765	24–17
42	January 13	@ Houston	W 110–105	Tony Allen (22)	Zach Randolph (12)	Mike Conley Jr. (9)	Toyota Center; 18,055	25–17
43	January 15	Chicago	L 104–108	Mike Conley Jr. (28)	Zach Randolph (16)	Mike Conley Jr. (8)	FedExForum; 18,119	25–18
44	January 18	@ Washington	L 101–104	Marc Gasol (28)	JaMychal Green (13)	Marc Gasol (7)	Verizon Center; 15,079	25–19
45	January 20	Sacramento	W 107–91	Marc Gasol (28)	Allen, Randolph (10)	Mike Conley Jr. (8)	FedExForum; 16,991	26–19
46	January 21	Houston	L 95–119	Marc Gasol (32)	JaMychal Green (9)	Mike Conley Jr. (6)	FedExForum; 18,119	26–20
47	January 25	Toronto	W 101–99	Marc Gasol (42)	Tony Allen (11)	Mike Conley Jr. (5)	FedExForum; 15,904	27–20
48	January 27	@ Portland	L 109–112	Marc Gasol (32)	Zach Randolph (13)	Mike Conley Jr. (10)	Moda Center; 19,558	27–21
49	January 28	@ Utah	W 102–95	Zach Randolph (28)	Zach Randolph (9)	Marc Gasol (5)	Vivint Smart Home Arena; 19,911	28–21
50	January 30	@ Phoenix	W 115–96	Mike Conley Jr. (38)	JaMychal Green (8)	Mike Conley Jr. (9)	Talking Stick Resort Arena; 16,332	29–21

February : 7–4 (home: 3–2; road: 4–2)

Game	Date	Team	Score	High points	High rebounds	High assists	Location Attendance	Record
51	February 1	@ Denver	W 119–99	Marc Gasol (24)	JaMychal Green (8)	Andrew Harrison (6)	Pepsi Center; 12,020	30–21
52	February 3	@ Oklahoma City	L 102–114	Marc Gasol (31)	Zach Randolph (10)	Marc Gasol (8)	Chesapeake Energy Arena; 18,203	30–22
53	February 4	@ Minnesota	W 107–99	JaMychal Green (29)	Zach Randolph (10)	Mike Conley Jr. (8)	Target Center; 15,081	31–22
54	February 6	San Antonio	W 89–74	Gasol, Randolph (15)	Marc Gasol (8)	Mike Conley Jr. (9)	FedExForum; 16,708	32–22
55	February 8	Phoenix	W 110–91	Mike Conley Jr. (23)	JaMychal Green (10)	Chandler Parsons (7)	FedExForum; 16,044	33–22
56	February 10	Golden State	L 107–122	Mike Conley Jr. (20)	Zach Randolph (13)	Mike Conley Jr. (9)	FedExForum; 18,119	33–23
57	February 13	@ Brooklyn	W 112–103	Mike Conley Jr. (32)	Marc Gasol (9)	Marc Gasol (8)	Barclays Center; 13,597	34–23
58	February 15	New Orleans	L 91–95	Mike Conley Jr. (17)	Marc Gasol (12)	Marc Gasol (9)	FedExForum; 16,145	34–24
59	February 24	@ Indiana	L 92–102	Troy Daniels (13)	Zach Randolph (8)	Mike Conley Jr. (7)	Bankers Life Fieldhouse; 17,923	34–25
60	February 26	@ Denver	W 105–98	Mike Conley Jr. (31)	Zach Randolph (11)	Marc Gasol (6)	Pepsi Center; 18,024	35–25
61	February 28	Phoenix	W 130–112	Mike Conley Jr. (29)	Zach Randolph (11)	Mike Conley Jr. (8)	FedExForum; 15,871	36–25

March : 6–9 (home: 4–3; road: 2–6)

Game	Date	Team	Score	High points	High rebounds	High assists	Location Attendance	Record
62	March 3	@ Dallas	L 100–104	Mike Conley Jr. (30)	Zach Randolph (10)	Gasol, Conley Jr. (8)	American Airlines Center; 19,480	36–26
63	March 4	@ Houston	L 108–123	Mike Conley Jr. (23)	JaMychal Green (10)	Gasol, Conley Jr. (7)	Toyota Center; 18,055	36–27
64	March 6	Brooklyn	L 109–122	Mike Conley Jr. (32)	JaMychal Green (9)	Mike Conley Jr. (6)	FedExForum; 15,505	36–28
65	March 9	L.A. Clippers	L 98–114	Marc Gasol (20)	Zach Randolph (11)	Marc Gasol (5)	FedExForum; 16,721	36–29
66	March 11	Atlanta	L 90–107	JaMychal Green (20)	JaMychal Green (11)	Mike Conley Jr. (5)	FedExForum; 17,523	36–30
67	March 13	Milwaukee	W 113–93	Vince Carter (24)	Gasol, Randolph (7)	Mike Conley Jr. (10)	FedExForum; 16,770	37–30
68	March 15	@ Chicago	W 98–91	Gasol, Conley Jr. (27)	Randolph, Conley Jr. (9)	Gasol, Conley Jr. (7)	United Center; 21,583	38–30
69	March 16	@ Atlanta	W 103–91	Mike Conley Jr. (22)	JaMychal Green (12)	Mike Conley Jr. (12)	Philips Arena; 17,063	39–30
70	March 18	San Antonio	W 104–96	Mike Conley Jr. (19)	Allen, Randolph, Conley Jr. (7)	Marc Gasol (7)	FedExForum; 18,119	40–30
71	March 21	@ New Orleans	L 82–95	Mike Conley Jr. (16)	Zach Randolph (10)	Gasol, Carter (4)	Smoothie King Center; 15,973	40–31
72	March 23	@ San Antonio	L 90–97	Mike Conley Jr. (22)	Marc Gasol (10)	Mike Conley Jr. (6)	AT&T Center; 18,418	40–32
73	March 26	@ Golden State	L 94–106	Mike Conley Jr. (29)	Randolph, Ennis (8)	Mike Conley Jr. (6)	Oracle Arena; 19,596	40–33
74	March 27	@ Sacramento	L 90–91	Mike Conley Jr. (22)	Zach Randolph (15)	Mike Conley Jr. (9)	Golden 1 Center; 17,608	40–34
75	March 29	Indiana	W 110–97	Mike Conley Jr. (36)	James Ennis (10)	Mike Conley Jr. (6)	FedExForum; 16,367	41–34
76	March 31	Dallas	W 99–90	Mike Conley Jr. (28)	Zach Randolph (12)	Mike Conley Jr. (6)	FedExForum; 17,317	42–34

April : 1–5 (home: 1–3; road: 0–2)

Game	Date	Team	Score	High points	High rebounds	High assists	Location Attendance	Record
77	April 2	@ L. A. Lakers	L 103–108	Conley Jr., Daniels (20)	Tony Allen (9)	Mike Conley Jr. (12)	Staples Center; 18,997	42–35
78	April 4	@ San Antonio	L 89–95 (OT)	Mike Conley Jr. (19)	Zach Randolph (16)	Marc Gasol (7)	AT&T Center; 18,418	42–36
79	April 5	Oklahoma City	L 100–103	Marc Gasol (23)	Zach Randolph (9)	Marc Gasol (5)	FedExForum; 17,298	42–37
80	April 7	New York	W 101–88	Mike Conley Jr. (31)	Marc Gasol (10)	Mike Conley Jr. (6)	FedExForum; 17,631	43–37
81	April 9	Detroit	L 90–103	Mike Conley Jr. (15)	JaMychal Green (7)	Harrison, Gasol (5)	FedExForum; 16,521	43–38
82	April 12	Dallas	L 93–100	Conley Jr., Randolph (15)	Marc Gasol (8)	Carter, Gasol (4)	FedExForum; 16,274	43–39

2016–17 season schedule

=== Playoffs ===
2017 playoff game log
Total: 2–4 (home: 2–1; road: 0–3)
First Round: 2–4 (home: 2–1; road: 0–3)

Game	Date	Team	Score	High points	High rebounds	High assists	Location Attendance	Series
1	April 15	@ San Antonio	L 82–111	Marc Gasol (32)	Conley, Gasol (5)	Mike Conley (7)	AT&T Center; 18,418	0–1
2	April 17	@ San Antonio	L 82–96	Mike Conley Jr. (24)	Zach Randolph (10)	Mike Conley Jr. (8)	AT&T Center; 18,418	0–2
3	April 20	San Antonio	W 105–94	Mike Conley Jr. (24)	Zach Randolph (8)	Mike Conley Jr. (8)	FedExForum; 18,119	1–2
4	April 22	San Antonio	W 110–108 (OT)	Mike Conley Jr. (35)	Marc Gasol (12)	Mike Conley Jr. (8)	FedExForum; 18,119	2–2
5	April 25	@ San Antonio	L 103–116	Mike Conley Jr. (26)	Zach Randolph (6)	Marc Gasol (7)	AT&T Center; 18,418	2–3
6	April 27	San Antonio	L 96–103	Mike Conley Jr. (26)	Zach Randolph (11)	Marc Gasol (6)	FedExForum; 18,119	2–4

2017 playoff schedule

== Player statistics ==
=== Ragular season ===
Player	POS	GP	GS	MP	REB	AST	STL	BLK	PTS	MPG	RPG	APG	SPG	BPG	PPG
JaMychal Green	PF	77	75	2,101	544	84	47	34	689	27.3	7.1	1.1	.6	.4	8.9
Marc Gasol	C	74	74	2,531	464	338	67	99	1,446	34.2	6.3	4.6	.9	1.3	19.5
Vince Carter	SF	73	15	1,799	227	133	60	36	586	24.6	3.1	1.8	.8	.5	8.0
Zach Randolph	PF	73	5	1,786	598	122	38	10	1,028	24.5	8.2	1.7	.5	.1	14.1
Andrew Harrison	PG	72	18	1,474	136	198	53	21	425	20.5	1.9	2.8	.7	.3	5.9
Tony Allen	SG	71	66	1,914	391	98	115	29	643	27.0	5.5	1.4	1.6	.4	9.1
Mike Conley Jr.	PG	69	68	2,292	241	433	92	19	1,415	33.2	3.5	6.3	1.3	.3	20.5
Troy Daniels	SG	67	3	1,183	100	46	20	4	551	17.7	1.5	.7	.3	.1	8.2
James Ennis III	SF	64	28	1,501	259	64	46	19	429	23.5	4.0	1.0	.7	.3	6.7
Jarell Martin	PF	42	3	558	162	8	17	9	165	13.3	3.9	.2	.4	.2	3.9
Deyonta Davis	C	36	0	238	60	2	3	17	58	6.6	1.7	.1	.1	.5	1.6
Chandler Parsons	SF	34	34	675	84	55	20	5	210	19.9	2.5	1.6	.6	.1	6.2
Wade Baldwin IV	PG	33	1	405	46	61	18	7	106	12.3	1.4	1.8	.5	.2	3.2
Brandan Wright	PF	28	5	447	78	15	11	20	189	16.0	2.8	.5	.4	.7	6.8
Troy Williams^{†}	SF	24	13	418	45	19	24	9	127	17.4	1.9	.8	1.0	.4	5.3
Toney Douglas	PG	24	0	394	61	56	18	5	117	16.4	2.5	2.3	.8	.2	4.9
Wayne Selden Jr.^{†}	SG	11	2	189	11	12	4	1	55	17.2	1.0	1.1	.4	.1	5.0

- ^{†} Denotes player spent time with another team in the season. Stats reflect time with the Grizzlies only.

=== Playoffs ===
Player	POS	GP	GS	MP	REB	AST	STL	BLK	PTS	MPG	RPG	APG	SPG	BPG	PPG
Marc Gasol	C	6	6	240	39	25	2	4	116	40.0	6.5	4.2	.3	.7	19.3
Mike Conley Jr.	PG	6	6	224	20	42	10	3	148	37.3	3.3	7.0	1.7	.5	24.7
Vince Carter	SF	6	6	195	20	9	2	0	55	32.5	3.3	1.5	.3	.0	9.2
Zach Randolph	PF	6	4	191	49	4	5	2	79	31.8	8.2	.7	.8	.3	13.2
James Ennis III	SF	6	4	159	25	7	5	2	50	26.5	4.2	1.2	.8	.3	8.3
JaMychal Green	PF	6	2	118	20	2	0	0	44	19.7	3.3	.3	.0	.0	7.3
Wayne Selden Jr.	SG	6	2	106	9	7	1	1	23	17.7	1.5	1.2	.2	.2	3.8
Andrew Harrison	PG	6	0	119	11	13	3	1	39	19.8	1.8	2.2	.5	.2	6.5
Troy Daniels	SG	6	0	68	5	2	2	0	9	11.3	.8	.3	.3	.0	1.5
Wade Baldwin IV	PG	3	0	12	4	2	0	0	2	4.0	1.3	.7	.0	.0	.7
Deyonta Davis	C	3	0	11	5	0	0	0	7	3.7	1.7	.0	.0	.0	2.3
Jarell Martin	PF	3	0	10	4	0	1	0	2	3.3	1.3	.0	.3	.0	.7
Brandan Wright	PF	2	0	12	2	0	0	2	4	6.0	1.0	.0	.0	1.0	2.0

== Transactions ==
=== Trades ===
June 23, 2016	To Memphis Grizzlies Draft rights to Deyonta Davis; Rade Zagorac	To Boston Celtics 2019 L.A. Clippers protected 1st round-pick
July 12, 2016	To Memphis Grizzlies Troy Daniels (sign and trade)	To Charlotte Hornets Cash considerations

=== Free agency ===
==== Re-signed ====
Player	Signed
Mike Conley Jr.	5-year contract worth $153 million

==== Additions ====
Player	Signed	Former team
Chandler Parsons	4-year contract worth $94.8 million	Dallas Mavericks
James Ennis	2-year contract worth $6 million	New Orleans Pelicans
Wayne Selden Jr.		Kansas
D. J. Stephens		Iowa Energy
Troy Williams		Indiana
Tony Wroten		New York Knicks

==== Subtractions ====
Player	Reason left	New team
Matt Barnes	2-year contract worth $12 million	Sacramento Kings
