= 2016–17 Atlanta Hawks season =

Season of National Basketball Association team the Atlanta Hawks

- Head coach: Mike Budenholzer
- Owners: Tony Ressler
- Arena: Philips Arena

Results
- Record: 43–39 (.524)
- Place: Division: 2nd (Southeast); Conference: 5th (Eastern)
- Playoff finish: First Round (lost to Wizards 2–4)
- Stats at Basketball Reference

Local media
- Television: Fox Sports South
- Radio: 92.9 FM "The Game"

The 2016–17 Atlanta Hawks season was the 68th season of the franchise in the National Basketball Association (NBA) and the 49th in Atlanta.

The Hawks finished the regular season with a 43–39 record, securing the 5th seed. In the playoffs, they faced off against the Washington Wizards in the First Round, where they lost in six games.

This was the first season since the 2006–07 season that All-Star center Al Horford was not on the Atlanta roster, as he joined the Boston Celtics during the summer. It was the last time until 2021 that the Hawks would make the playoffs.

== Draft picks ==
Round	Pick	Player	Position	Nationality	School/Club team
1	12	Taurean Prince	SF	United States	Baylor
1	21	DeAndre' Bembry	SF	United States	St. Joseph's
2	44	Isaia Cordinier	SG	France	Denain-Voltaire
2	54	Kay Felder	PG	United States	Oakland

== Roster ==
2016–17 Atlanta Hawks roster
Players

Pos.	No.	Player	Height	Weight	DOB	From
SF	24	Kent Bazemore	6 ft 5 in (1.96 m)	201 lb (91 kg)	1989-07-01	Old Dominion
SF	95	DeAndre' Bembry	6 ft 6 in (1.98 m)	210 lb (95 kg)	1994-07-04	Saint Joseph's
PG	13	José Calderón	6 ft 3 in (1.91 m)	200 lb (91 kg)	1981-09-28	Spain
PG	5	Malcolm Delaney	6 ft 3 in (1.91 m)	190 lb (86 kg)	1989-03-11	Virginia Tech
SF	34	Mike Dunleavy	6 ft 9 in (2.06 m)	230 lb (104 kg)	1980-09-25	Duke
SG	10	Tim Hardaway Jr.	6 ft 6 in (1.98 m)	205 lb (93 kg)	1992-03-16	Michigan
C	8	Dwight Howard	6 ft 11 in (2.11 m)	265 lb (120 kg)	1985-12-08	SW Atlanta Academy (GA)
PF	43	Kris Humphries	6 ft 9 in (2.06 m)	235 lb (107 kg)	1985-02-06	Minnesota
PF	7	Ersan İlyasova	6 ft 10 in (2.08 m)	235 lb (107 kg)	1987-05-15	Turkey
PF	30	Ryan Kelly	6 ft 11 in (2.11 m)	230 lb (104 kg)	1991-04-09	Duke
PF	4	Paul Millsap	6 ft 8 in (2.03 m)	246 lb (112 kg)	1985-02-10	Louisiana Tech
C	31	Mike Muscala	6 ft 11 in (2.11 m)	240 lb (109 kg)	1991-07-01	Bucknell
SF	12	Taurean Prince	6 ft 8 in (2.03 m)	220 lb (100 kg)	1994-03-22	Baylor
PG	17	Dennis Schröder	6 ft 1 in (1.85 m)	172 lb (78 kg)	1993-09-15	Germany
SF	25	Thabo Sefolosha	6 ft 7 in (2.01 m)	220 lb (100 kg)	1984-05-02	Switzerland

Coaches
Head coach
- Mike Budenholzer
Assistant(s)
- Darvin Ham
- Taylor Jenkins
- Charles Lee
- Neven Spahija
- Ben Sullivan
- Pete Radulovic (player development)

Legend
- (DP) Unsigned draft pick
- (FA) Free agent
- (S) Suspended
- (DL) On assignment to D-League affiliate
- Injured

Roster
Updated: 2017-04-04

== Standings ==
=== Division ===
Southeast Division	W	L	PCT	GB	Home	Road	Div	GP
y – Washington Wizards	49	33	.598	–	30‍–‍11	19‍–‍22	8–8	82
x – Atlanta Hawks	43	39	.524	6.0	23‍–‍18	20‍–‍21	6–10	82
Miami Heat	41	41	.500	8.0	23‍–‍18	18‍–‍23	9–7	82
Charlotte Hornets	36	46	.439	13.0	22‍–‍19	14‍–‍27	10–6	82
Orlando Magic	29	53	.354	20.0	16‍–‍25	13‍–‍28	7–9	82

=== Conference ===
Eastern Conference
#	Team	W	L	PCT	GB	GP
1	c – Boston Celtics *	53	29	.646	–	82
2	y – Cleveland Cavaliers *	51	31	.622	2.0	82
3	x – Toronto Raptors	51	31	.622	2.0	82
4	y – Washington Wizards *	49	33	.598	4.0	82
5	x – Atlanta Hawks	43	39	.524	10.0	82
6	x – Milwaukee Bucks	42	40	.512	11.0	82
7	x – Indiana Pacers	42	40	.512	11.0	82
8	x – Chicago Bulls	41	41	.500	12.0	82
9	Miami Heat	41	41	.500	12.0	82
10	Detroit Pistons	37	45	.451	16.0	82
11	Charlotte Hornets	36	46	.439	17.0	82
12	New York Knicks	31	51	.378	22.0	82
13	Orlando Magic	29	53	.354	24.0	82
14	Philadelphia 76ers	28	54	.341	25.0	82
15	Brooklyn Nets	20	62	.244	33.0	82

== Game log ==
=== Pre-season ===
2016 pre-season game log
Total: 5–2 (home: 2–1; road: 3–1)
Pre-season: 5–2 (home: 2–1; road: 3–1)

Game	Date	Team	Score	High points	High rebounds	High assists	Location Attendance	Record
1	October 6	@ Memphis	W 104–83	Walter Tavares (15)	Walter Tavares (10)	Will Bynum (4)	Cintas Center; 13,246	1–0
2	October 8	@ San Antonio	L 91–102	Delaney, Prince (13)	Walter Tavares (7)	Will Bynum (7)	AT&T Center; 18,555	1–1
3	October 10	Cleveland	W 99–93	Dwight Howard (26)	Dwight Howard (8)	Mike Muscala (5)	Philips Arena; 16,202	2–1
4	October 13	Detroit	L 94–99	Dennis Schroder (17)	Dwight Howard (9)	Dennis Schroder (9)	Philips Arena; 10,852	2–2
5	October 16	@ Orlando	W 105–98	Hardaway Jr., Millsap (19)	Paul Millsap (9)	Paul Millsap (7)	Amway Arena; 15,081	3–2
6	October 18	New Orleans	W 96–89	Tim Hardaway Jr. (16)	Dwight Howard (11)	Dennis Schroder (5)	Philips Arena; 10,866	4–2
7	October 20	@ Chicago	W 97–81	Howard, Schroder (16)	Dwight Howard (15)	Korver, Schroder (6)	CenturyLink Center; 16,506	5–2

2016–17 season schedule

=== Regular season ===
2016–17 game log
Total: 43–39 (home: 23–18; road: 20–21)
October: 3–0 (home: 2–0; road: 1–0)

Game	Date	Team	Score	High points	High rebounds	High assists	Location Attendance	Record
1	October 27	Washington	W 114–99	Paul Millsap (28)	Dwight Howard (19)	Sefolosha, Delaney (5)	Philips Arena; 19,049	1–0
2	October 29	@ Philadelphia	W 104–72	Paul Millsap (17)	Dwight Howard (7)	Dennis Schröder (11)	Wells Fargo Center; 16,312	2–0
3	October 31	Sacramento	W 106–95	Dwight Howard (18)	Dwight Howard (11)	Paul Millsap (8)	Philips Arena; 12,501	3–0

November : 7–9 (home: 4–2; road: 3–7)

Game	Date	Team	Score	High points	High rebounds	High assists	Location Attendance	Record
4	November 2	L. A. Lakers	L 116–123	Dwight Howard (31)	Dwight Howard (11)	Bazemore, Schröder (6)	Philips Arena; 13,800	3–1
5	November 4	@ Washington	L 92–95	Howard, Schröder (20)	Dwight Howard (12)	Kent Bazemore (5)	Verizon Center; 14,663	3–2
6	November 5	Houston	W 112–97	Paul Millsap (23)	Dwight Howard (14)	Dennis Schröder (11)	Philips Arena; 16,895	4–2
7	November 8	@ Cleveland	W 110–106	Dennis Schröder (28)	Dwight Howard (17)	Dennis Schröder (6)	Quicken Loans Arena; 20,562	5–2
8	November 9	Chicago	W 115–107	Thabo Sefolosha (20)	Paul Millsap (11)	Paul Millsap (6)	Philips Arena; 16,354	6–2
9	November 12	Philadelphia	W 117–96	Tim Hardaway Jr. (20)	Dwight Howard (11)	Dennis Schröder (8)	Philips Arena; 17,399	7–2
10	November 15	@ Miami	W 93–90	Dennis Schröder (18)	Dwight Howard (17)	Schröder, Millsap (4)	AmericanAirlines Arena; 19,600	8–2
11	November 16	Milwaukee	W 107–100	Paul Millsap (21)	Paul Millsap (8)	Dennis Schröder (8)	Philips Arena; 14,656	9–2
12	November 18	@ Charlotte	L 96–100	Paul Millsap (22)	Dwight Howard (18)	Malcolm Delaney (8)	Time Warner Cable Arena; 17,989	9–3
13	November 20	@ New York	L 94–104	Dwight Howard (18)	Dwight Howard (18)	Millsap, Bazemore (5)	Madison Square Garden; 19,812	9–4
14	November 22	New Orleans	L 94–112	Schroder, Korver (14)	Paul Millsap (8)	Dennis Schröder (7)	Philips Arena; 19,120	9–5
15	November 23	@ Indiana	W 96–85	Dwight Howard (23)	Dwight Howard (20)	Paul Millsap (5)	Bankers Life Fieldhouse; 16,032	10–5
16	November 25	@ Utah	L 68–95	Dennis Schröder (16)	Howard, Prince (7)	Taurean Prince (3)	Vivint Smart Home Arena; 19,911	10–6
17	November 27	@ L.A. Lakers	L 94–109	Kent Bazemore (21)	Dwight Howard (11)	Dennis Schröder (8)	STAPLES Center; 18,997	10–7
18	November 28	@ Golden State	L 100–105	Dennis Schröder (24)	Dwight Howard (16)	Dennis Schröder (6)	ORACLE Arena; 19,596	10–8
19	November 30	@ Phoenix	L 107–109	Dennis Schröder (31)	Dwight Howard (14)	Dennis Schröder (9)	Talking Stick Resort Arena; 15,909	10–9

December : 7–7 (home: 3–5; road: 4–2)

Game	Date	Team	Score	High points	High rebounds	High assists	Location Attendance	Record
20	December 2	Detroit	L 85–121	Dennis Schröder (17)	Howard, Prince (6)	Dennis Schröder (11)	Philips Arena; 15,500	10–10
21	December 3	@ Toronto	L 84–128	Dennis Schröder (15)	Dwight Howard (17)	Dennis Schröder (6)	Air Canada Centre; 19,800	10–11
22	December 5	Oklahoma City	L 99–102	Paul Millsap (24)	Dwight Howard (7)	Dennis Schröder (8)	Philips Arena; 14,654	10–12
23	December 7	Miami	W 103–95	Dwight Howard (23)	Dwight Howard (17)	Dennis Schröder (7)	Philips Arena; 11,326	11–12
24	December 9	@ Milwaukee	W 114–110	Dennis Schröder (33)	Paul Millsap (14)	Paul Millsap (6)	BMO Harris Bradley Center; 16,289	12–12
25	December 13	Orlando	L 120–131	Dwight Howard (20)	Dwight Howard (16)	Dennis Schröder (13)	Philips Arena; 17,789	12–13
26	December 16	@ Toronto	W 125–121	Dwight Howard (27)	Dwight Howard (15)	Dennis Schröder (6)	Air Canada Centre; 19,800	13–13
27	December 17	Charlotte	L 99–107	Tim Hardaway Jr. (21)	Dwight Howard (23)	Dennis Schröder (6)	Philips Arena; 17,918	13–14
28	December 19	@ Oklahoma City	W 110–108	Dennis Schröder (31)	Paul Millsap (11)	Dennis Schröder (8)	Chesapeake Energy Arena; 18,203	14–14
29	December 21	Minnesota	L 84–92	Dennis Schröder (21)	Paul Millsap (10)	Schröder, Millsap (7)	Philips Arena; 17,578	14–15
30	December 23	@ Denver	W 109–108	Dennis Schröder (27)	Humphries, Millsap (8)	Dennis Schröder (5)	Pepsi Center; 13,823	15–15
31	December 26	@ Minnesota	L 90–104	Dwight Howard (20)	Dwight Howard (12)	Schröder, Muscala (4)	Target Center; 15,617	15–16
32	December 28	New York	W 102–98 (OT)	Dennis Schröder (27)	Dwight Howard (22)	Paul Millsap (6)	Philips Arena; 19,066	16–16
33	December 30	Detroit	W 105–98	Paul Millsap (26)	Dwight Howard (11)	Schröder, Delaney (7)	Philips Arena; 19,009	17–16

January : 11–4 (home: 5–3; road: 6–1)

Game	Date	Team	Score	High points	High rebounds	High assists	Location Attendance	Record
34	January 1	San Antonio	W 114–112 (OT)	Paul Millsap (32)	Paul Millsap (13)	Dennis Schröder (10)	Philips Arena; 18,088	18–16
35	January 4	@ Orlando	W 111–92	Dennis Schröder (18)	Dwight Howard (12)	Dennis Schröder (7)	Amway Center; 18,846	19–16
36	January 5	@ New Orleans	W 99–94	Dennis Schröder (23)	Dwight Howard (11)	Malcolm Delaney (8)	Smoothie King Center; 15,003	20–16
37	January 7	@ Dallas	W 97–82	Dennis Schröder (20)	Dwight Howard (20)	Paul Millsap (6)	American Airlines Center; 19,655	21–16
38	January 10	@ Brooklyn	W 117–97	Dennis Schröder (19)	Dwight Howard (16)	Dennis Schröder (10)	Barclays Center; 13,279	22–16
39	January 13	Boston	L 101–103	Hardaway Jr., Millsap (23)	Dwight Howard (8)	Paul Millsap (6)	Philips Arena; 18,216	22–17
40	January 15	Milwaukee	W 111–98	Kent Bazemore (24)	Dwight Howard (14)	Dennis Schröder (6)	Philips Arena; 14,231	23–17
41	January 16	@ New York	W 108–107	Dennis Schröder (28)	Millsap, Humphries (7)	Paul Millsap (6)	Madison Square Garden; 19,812	24–17
42	January 18	@ Detroit	L 95–118	Paul Millsap (21)	Paul Millsap (8)	Dennis Schröder (6)	The Palace of Auburn Hills; 15,159	24–18
43	January 20	Chicago	W 102–93	Dennis Schröder (25)	Paul Millsap (9)	Dennis Schröder (6)	Philips Arena; 16,328	25–18
44	January 21	Philadelphia	W 110–93	Paul Millsap (22)	Dwight Howard (15)	Dennis Schröder (9)	Philips Arena; 15,116	26–18
45	January 23	LA Clippers	L 105–115	Kent Bazemore (25)	Dwight Howard (12)	Millsap, Schröder (7)	Philips Arena; 12,853	26–19
46	January 25	@ Chicago	W 119–114	Dennis Schröder (24)	Dwight Howard (12)	Dennis Schröder (9)	United Center; 21,445	27–19
47	January 27	Washington	L 86–112	Kent Bazemore (15)	Dwight Howard (13)	Dennis Schröder (5)	Philips Arena; 16,968	27–20
48	January 29	New York	W 142–139 (4OT)	Paul Millsap (37)	Paul Millsap (19)	Dennis Schröder (15)	Philips Arena; 13,643	28–20

February : 5–6 (home: 2–2; road: 3–4)

Game	Date	Team	Score	High points	High rebounds	High assists	Location Attendance	Record
49	February 1	@ Miami	L 93–116	Kent Bazemore (14)	Dwight Howard (11)	DeAndre' Bembry (3)	AmericanAirlines Arena; 19,600	28–21
50	February 2	@ Houston	W 113–108	Tim Hardaway Jr (33)	Dwight Howard (23)	Kent Bazemore (6)	Toyota Center; 15,602	29–21
51	February 4	Orlando	W 113–86	Hardaway Jr., Millsap (21)	Dwight Howard (13)	Dennis Schröder (10)	Philips Arena; 16,691	30–21
52	February 6	Utah	L 95–120	Dennis Schröder (21)	Howard, Millsap (8)	Hardaway Jr., Millsap, Muscala (3)	Philips Arena; 13,126	30–22
53	February 8	Denver	W 117–106	Dennis Schröder (24)	Dwight Howard (13)	Dennis Schröder (10)	Philips Arena; 14,222	31–22
54	February 10	@ Sacramento	L 107–108	Tim Hardaway Jr (28)	Dwight Howard (11)	Dennis Schröder (6)	Golden 1 Center; 17,608	31–23
55	February 13	@ Portland	W 109–104 (OT)	Dennis Schröder (22)	Dwight Howard (16)	Kent Bazemore (6)	Moda Center; 19,475	32–23
56	February 15	@ LA Clippers	L 84–99	Dennis Schröder (15)	Dwight Howard (15)	Dwight Howard (7)	STAPLES Center; 19,060	32–24
57	February 24	Miami	L 90–108	Paul Millsap (21)	Mike Muscala (9)	Malcolm Delaney (4)	Philips Arena; 18,122	32–25
58	February 25	@ Orlando	L 86–105	Tim Hardaway Jr. (15)	Dwight Howard (14)	Dennis Schröder (8)	Amway Center; 18,498	32–26
59	February 27	@ Boston	W 114–98	Dennis Schröder (21)	Dwight Howard (12)	Dennis Schröder (5)	TD Garden; 18,624	33–26

March : 6–10 (home: 4–6; road: 2–4)

Game	Date	Team	Score	High points	High rebounds	High assists	Location Attendance	Record
60	March 1	Dallas	W 100–95	Paul Millsap (18)	Dwight Howard (12)	Paul Millsap (10)	Philips Arena; 12,483	34–26
61	March 3	Cleveland	L 130–135	Tim Hardaway Jr. (36)	Dwight Howard (10)	Schroder, Bazemore (7)	Philips Arena; 18,877	34–27
62	March 5	Indiana	L 96–97	Tim Hardaway Jr. (24)	Dwight Howard (14)	Dennis Schroder (7)	Philips Arena; 15,366	34–28
63	March 6	Golden State	L 111–119	Dennis Schroder (23)	Dwight Howard (19)	Tim Hardaway Jr. (5)	Philips Arena; 18,890	34–29
64	March 8	Brooklyn	W 110–105	Dennis Schröder (31)	Dwight Howard (14)	Dennis Schröder (5)	Philips Arena; 11,931	35–29
65	March 10	Toronto	W 105–99	Dennis Schröder (26)	Dwight Howard (10)	Tim Hardaway Jr. (6)	Philips Arena; 16,078	36–29
66	March 11	@ Memphis	W 107–90	Taurean Prince (17)	Paul Millsap (11)	Dennis Schröder (8)	FedExForum; 17,523	37–29
67	March 13	@ San Antonio	L 99–107	Dennis Schröder (22)	Dwight Howard (13)	Dennis Schröder (10)	AT&T Center; 18,418	37–30
68	March 16	Memphis	L 91–103	Tim Hardaway Jr. (18)	Dwight Howard (10)	José Calderón (4)	Philips Arena; 17,063	37–31
69	March 18	Portland	L 97–113	Ersan Ilyasova (23)	Dwight Howard (10)	Dennis Schröder (7)	Philips Arena; 16,543	37–32
70	March 20	@ Charlotte	L 90–105	Dennis Schröder (20)	Dwight Howard (10)	Dennis Schröder (6)	Spectrum Center; 14,278	37–33
71	March 22	@ Washington	L 100–104	Tim Hardaway Jr. (29)	Dwight Howard (16)	Dennis Schröder (6)	Verizon Center; 18,137	37–34
72	March 24	@ Milwaukee	L 97–100	Dennis Schröder (28)	Dwight Howard (12)	Dennis Schröder (7)	Bradley Center; 16,786	37–35
73	March 26	Brooklyn	L 92–107	Dennis Schröder (24)	Ersan Ilyasova (18)	Dennis Schröder (6)	Philips Arena; 15,921	37–36
74	March 28	Phoenix	W 95–91	Dennis Schröder (27)	Ersan Ilyasova (12)	Dennis Schröder (9)	Philips Arena; 13,412	38–36
75	March 29	@ Philadelphia	W 99–92	Dwight Howard (22)	Dwight Howard (20)	Dennis Schröder (5)	Wells Fargo Center; 15,212	39–36

April : 4–3 (home: 3–0; road: 1–3)

Game	Date	Team	Score	High points	High rebounds	High assists	Location Attendance	Record
76	April 1	@ Chicago	L 104–106	Dennis Schröder (29)	Dwight Howard (12)	Dennis Schröder (6)	United Center; 22,019	39–37
77	April 2	@ Brooklyn	L 82–91	Dennis Schröder (16)	Dwight Howard (11)	Dennis Schröder (8)	Barclays Center; 15,040	39–38
78	April 6	Boston	W 123–116	Paul Millsap (26)	Paul Millsap (12)	Hardaway Jr., Schröder (5)	Philips Arena; 18,688	40–38
79	April 7	@ Cleveland	W 114–100	Tim Hardaway Jr. (22)	Humphries, Ilyasova (7)	Malcolm Delaney (8)	Quicken Loans Arena; 20,562	41–38
80	April 9	Cleveland	W 126–125 (OT)	Paul Millsap (22)	Hardaway Jr., Millsap (9)	Dennis Schröder (5)	Philips Arena; 18,835	42–38
81	April 11	Charlotte	W 103–76	Dwight Howard (19)	Dwight Howard (12)	Dennis Schröder (9)	Philips Arena; 14,205	43–38
82	April 12	@ Indiana	L 86–104	Ersan Ilyasova (15)	Kris Humphries (8)	Delaney, Calderón (5)	Bankers Life Fieldhouse; 17,923	43–39

2016–17 season schedule

=== Playoffs ===
2017 playoff game log
Total: 2–4 (home: 2–1; road: 0–3)
First Round: 2–4 (home: 2–1; road: 0–3)

Game	Date	Team	Score	High points	High rebounds	High assists	Location Attendance	Series
1	April 16	@ Washington	L 107–114	Dennis Schröder (25)	Dwight Howard (14)	Dennis Schröder (9)	Verizon Center; 20,356	0–1
2	April 19	@ Washington	L 101–109	Paul Millsap (27)	Paul Millsap (10)	Dennis Schröder (6)	Verizon Center; 20,356	0–2
3	April 22	Washington	W 116–98	Paul Millsap (29)	Paul Millsap (14)	Dennis Schröder (9)	Philips Arena; 18,866	1–2
4	April 24	Washington	W 111–101	Paul Millsap (19)	Dwight Howard (15)	Millsap, Bazemore (7)	Philips Arena; 18,676	2–2
5	April 26	@ Washington	L 99–103	Dennis Schröder (29)	Paul Millsap (11)	Dennis Schröder (11)	Verizon Center; 20,356	2–3
6	April 28	Washington	L 99–115	Paul Millsap (31)	Paul Millsap (10)	Dennis Schröder (10)	Philips Arena; 18,849	2–4

2017 playoff schedule

== Player statistics ==
Legend
GP	Games played	GS	Games started	MPG	Minutes per game
FG%	Field-goal percentage	3P%	3-point field-goal percentage	FT%	Free-throw percentage
RPG	Rebounds per game	APG	Assists per game	SPG	Steals per game
BPG	Blocks per game	PPG	Points per game

=== Regular season ===
Player	GP	GS	MPG	FG%	3P%	FT%	RPG	APG	SPG	BPG	PPG
Dennis Schröder	79	78	31.5	.451	.340	.855	3.1	6.3	.9	.2	17.9
Tim Hardaway Jr.	79	30	27.3	.455	.357	.766	2.8	2.3	.7	.2	14.5
Dwight Howard	74	74	29.7	.633	.000	.533	12.7	1.4	.9	1.2	13.5
Kent Bazemore	73	64	26.9	.409	.346	.708	3.2	2.4	1.2	.7	11.0
Malcolm Delaney	73	2	17.1	.374	.236	.806	1.7	2.6	.5	.0	5.4
Mike Muscala	70	3	17.7	.504	.418	.766	3.4	1.4	.4	.6	6.2
Paul Millsap	69	67	34.0	.442	.311	.768	7.7	3.7	1.3	.9	18.1
Thabo Sefolosha	62	42	25.7	.441	.342	.733	4.4	1.7	1.5	.5	7.2
Taurean Prince	59	10	16.6	.400	.324	.787	2.7	.9	.7	.5	5.7
Kris Humphries	56	4	12.3	.407	.352	.780	3.7	.5	.3	.4	4.6
DeAndre' Bembry	38	1	9.8	.480	.056	.375	1.6	.7	.2	.1	2.7
Kyle Korver^{†}	32	21	27.9	.439	.409	.889	2.8	2.3	.7	.4	9.5
Mike Dunleavy Jr.^{†}	30	0	15.8	.438	.429	.846	2.3	1.0	.3	.2	5.6
Ersan İlyasova^{†}	26	12	24.3	.412	.348	.800	5.8	1.7	.8	.3	10.4
Mike Scott	18	0	10.8	.288	.148	.875	2.1	.9	.2	.2	2.5
José Calderón^{†}	17	2	14.5	.404	.267	.875	1.9	2.2	.2	.0	3.6
Ryan Kelly	16	0	6.9	.286	.400	.833	1.1	.5	.3	.3	1.6
Lamar Patterson	5	0	8.0	.200	.167	.667	1.4	1.2	.2	.0	1.8
Gary Neal	2	0	9.0	.000	.000	1.000	.5	.5	.0	.0	2.0
Edy Tavares^{†}	1	0	4.0	1.000		.000	1.0	.0	.0	.0	2.0

=== Playoffs ===
Player	GP	GS	MPG	FG%	3P%	FT%	RPG	APG	SPG	BPG	PPG
Paul Millsap	6	6	36.5	.505	.176	.811	9.3	4.3	1.7	.7	24.3
Dennis Schröder	6	6	35.2	.455	.425	.838	2.3	7.7	1.0	.0	24.7
Tim Hardaway Jr.	6	6	33.3	.329	.262	.632	2.7	1.2	.5	.0	12.8
Taurean Prince	6	6	31.2	.558	.286	1.000	5.3	1.3	.3	.2	11.2
Dwight Howard	6	6	26.2	.500		.632	10.7	1.3	1.0	.8	8.0
Kent Bazemore	6	0	25.0	.396	.292	.714	3.8	3.3	.7	.8	9.8
Ersan İlyasova	6	0	15.0	.348	.200	.778	5.2	.3	.2	.0	4.0
Mike Muscala	6	0	13.5	.278	.000	.875	2.7	.3	.2	.5	2.8
José Calderón	6	0	12.5	.478	.333		1.3	2.2	.3	.2	4.3
Mike Dunleavy Jr.	6	0	8.8	.429	.400	1.000	.8	.3	.2	.0	2.0
Thabo Sefolosha	4	0	2.3	.000		.250	.0	.0	.0	.0	.3
Malcolm Delaney	1	0	3.0	1.000	1.000	.500	1.0	.0	.0	.0	8.0
Kris Humphries	1	0	3.0				.0	.0	.0	1.0	.0

- ^{†} Denotes player spent time with another team in the season. Stats reflect time with the Hawks only.

== Transactions ==
=== Overview ===
Players Added

Via draft

- DeAndre' Bembry
- Isaia Cordinier

Via free agency

- Dwight Howard
- Malcolm Delaney
- Jarrett Jack

Via trade

- Taurean Prince
- Mike Dunleavy
- Mo Williams
Players Lost

Via free agency

- Al Horford
- Kirk Hinrich

Via trade

- Jeff Teague
- Kyle Korver

Waived

- Lamar Patterson
- Richard Solomon

=== Trades ===
June 23, 2016	To Atlanta Hawks Draft rights to Taurean Prince (from Utah)	To Indiana Pacers Jeff Teague (from Atlanta)
June 23, 2016	To Utah Jazz George Hill (from Indiana)
June 24, 2016	To Atlanta Hawks Financial considerations	To Cleveland Cavaliers Draft rights to Kay Felder
February 22, 2017	To Atlanta Hawks Ersan Ilyasova	To Philadelphia 76ers Tiago Splitter; Two 2017 second-round picks
February 22, 2017	To Atlanta Hawks Top 55 protected pick	To Phoenix Suns Mike Scott; Draft rights to Cenk Akyol; Cash Considerations

=== Free agents ===
==== Re-signed ====
Player	Signed	Former Team
Mike Muscala	Picked up 1-year team option worth $1 Million	Atlanta Hawks
Kent Bazemore	Signed 4-year worth $70 Million	Atlanta Hawks
Kris Humphries	Signed 1-year worth $4 Million	Atlanta Hawks

==== Additions ====
Player	Signed	Former team
Dwight Howard	Signed 3-year contract worth $70 Million	Houston Rockets
Malcolm Delaney	Signed 2-year contract worth $1.44 Million	(Russia) Lokomotiv Kuban
Jarrett Jack	Signed 1-year contract for $6.3 million	Brooklyn Nets
Matt Costello	Signed 2-year contract for at least $50 thousand	Michigan State Spartans

* = Did not make 15-man roster

==== Subtractions ====
Player	Reason left	New team
Al Horford	Signed 4-year contract worth $113 Million	Boston Celtics
Lamar Patterson	Waived	Sacramento Kings
Walter Tavares	Waived	(Canada) Raptors 905 / Cleveland Cavaliers
Kyle Korver	Traded	Cleveland Cavaliers
