= 2016–17 Utah Jazz season =

NBA professional basketball team season

- Division champions
- Head coach: Quin Snyder
- General manager: Dennis Lindsey
- Arena: Vivint Arena

Results
- Record: 51–31 (.622)
- Place: Division: 1st (Northwest); Conference: 5th (Western)
- Playoff finish: Conference Semifinals (lost to Warriors 0–4)
- Stats at Basketball Reference

Local media
- Television: Root Sports Utah
- Radio: 1280; 97.5 The Zone

The 2016–17 Utah Jazz season was the 43rd season of the franchise in the National Basketball Association (NBA), and the 38th season of the franchise in Salt Lake City. They qualified for the playoffs for the first time since 2012.

The Jazz finished the regular season with a 51–31 record, securing the 5th seed. In the playoffs, the Jazz defeated the Los Angeles Clippers in the First Round in seven games and advanced to the Western Conference semifinals, where they were swept in four games by the eventual champion Golden State Warriors.

Following the season, Gordon Hayward would sign as a free agent with the Boston Celtics. He was also selected to play in the 2017 NBA All-Star Game.

== Draft picks ==
Round	Pick	Player	Position	Nationality	College
2	42	Isaiah Whitehead	PG/SG	United States	Seton Hall
2	52	Joel Bolomboy	PF/C	Ukraine	Weber State
2	60	Tyrone Wallace	PG	United States	California

== Roster ==
2016–17 Utah Jazz roster
Players

Pos.	No.	Player	Height	Weight	DOB	From
PF	21	Joel Bolomboy	6 ft 9 in (2.06 m)	235 lb (107 kg)	1994-01-28	Weber State
SG	10	Alec Burks	6 ft 6 in (1.98 m)	214 lb (97 kg)	1991-07-20	Colorado
PF	33	Boris Diaw	6 ft 8 in (2.03 m)	250 lb (113 kg)	1982-04-16	INSEP (FRA)
SG	11	Dante Exum	6 ft 6 in (1.98 m)	190 lb (86 kg)	1995-07-13	Lake Ginninderra (AUS)
PF	15	Derrick Favors	6 ft 10 in (2.08 m)	265 lb (120 kg)	1991-07-15	Georgia Tech
C	27	Rudy Gobert	7 ft 1 in (2.16 m)	245 lb (111 kg)	1992-06-26	France
SF	20	Gordon Hayward	6 ft 8 in (2.03 m)	226 lb (103 kg)	1990-03-23	Butler
PG	3	George Hill	6 ft 3 in (1.91 m)	188 lb (85 kg)	1986-05-04	IUPUI
SG	5	Rodney Hood	6 ft 8 in (2.03 m)	206 lb (93 kg)	1992-10-20	Duke
SF	2	Joe Ingles	6 ft 8 in (2.03 m)	226 lb (103 kg)	1987-10-02	Lake Ginninderra (AUS)
SF	6	Joe Johnson	6 ft 7 in (2.01 m)	240 lb (109 kg)	1981-06-29	Arkansas
PF	41	Trey Lyles	6 ft 10 in (2.08 m)	234 lb (106 kg)	1995-11-05	Kentucky
PG	8	Shelvin Mack	6 ft 3 in (1.91 m)	203 lb (92 kg)	1990-04-22	Butler
PG	25	Raul Neto	6 ft 1 in (1.85 m)	179 lb (81 kg)	1992-05-19	Brazil
C	24	Jeff Withey	7 ft 0 in (2.13 m)	231 lb (105 kg)	1990-03-07	Kansas

Coaches
Head coach
- Quin Snyder
Assistant(s)
- Johnnie Bryant
- Alex Jensen
- Zach Guthrie
- Igor Kokoškov
- Antonio Lang
- Mike Wells
- Mark McKown (player development)
- Jeff Watkinson (player development)

Legend
- (DP) Unsigned draft pick
- (FA) Free agent
- (S) Suspended
- (DL) On assignment to D-League affiliate
- Injured

Roster
Updated: 2017-02-24

== Standings ==
=== Division ===
Northwest Division	W	L	PCT	GB	Home	Road	Div	GP
y – Utah Jazz	51	31	.622	–	29‍–‍12	22‍–‍19	8–8	82
x – Oklahoma City Thunder	47	35	.573	4.0	28‍–‍13	19‍–‍22	10–6	82
x – Portland Trail Blazers	41	41	.500	10.0	25‍–‍16	16‍–‍25	11–5	82
e – Denver Nuggets	40	42	.488	11.0	22‍–‍19	18‍–‍23	6–10	82
e – Minnesota Timberwolves	31	51	.378	20.0	20‍–‍21	11‍–‍30	5–11	82

=== Conference ===
Western Conference
#	Team	W	L	PCT	GB	GP
1	z – Golden State Warriors *	67	15	.817	–	82
2	y – San Antonio Spurs *	61	21	.744	6.0	82
3	x – Houston Rockets	55	27	.671	12.0	82
4	x – Los Angeles Clippers	51	31	.622	16.0	82
5	y – Utah Jazz *	51	31	.622	16.0	82
6	x – Oklahoma City Thunder	47	35	.573	20.0	82
7	x – Memphis Grizzlies	43	39	.524	24.0	82
8	x – Portland Trail Blazers	41	41	.500	26.0	82
9	e – Denver Nuggets	40	42	.488	27.0	82
10	e – New Orleans Pelicans	34	48	.415	33.0	82
11	e – Dallas Mavericks	33	49	.402	34.0	82
12	e – Sacramento Kings	32	50	.390	35.0	82
13	e – Minnesota Timberwolves	31	51	.378	36.0	82
14	e – Los Angeles Lakers	26	56	.317	41.0	82
15	e – Phoenix Suns	24	58	.293	43.0	82

== Game log ==
=== Pre-season ===
2016 pre-season game log
Total: 3–3 (home: 1–2; road: 2–1)
Pre-season: 3–3 (home: 1–2; road: 2–1)

Game	Date	Team	Score	High points	High rebounds	High assists	Location Attendance	Record
1	October 3	@ Portland	L 89–98	Gordon Hayward (17)	Rudy Gobert (13)	Shelvin Mack (4)	Moda Center; 15,004	0–1
2	October 5	@ Phoenix	W 104–99	Rudy Gobert (21)	Rudy Gobert (10)	Hill, Mack (5)	Talking Stick Resort Arena; 8,407	1–1
3	October 10	@ L.A. Clippers	W 96–94	Rodney Hood (17)	George Hill, Trey Lyles (8)	George Hill (4)	Staples Center; 12,518	2–1
4	October 12	Phoenix	L 110–111	Dante Exum (18)	Rudy Gobert (8)	Shelvin Mack (4)	Vivint Smart Home Arena; 16,521	2–2
5	October 17	L.A. Clippers	W 104–78	Rudy Gobert (17)	Rudy Gobert (10)	Dante Exum (6)	Vivint Smart Home Arena; 18,811	3–2
6	October 19	Portland	L 84–88	George Hill (16)	Trey Lyles (8)	Boris Diaw (4)	Vivint Smart Home Arena; 17,519	3–3

2016–17 season schedule

=== Regular season ===
2016–17 game log
Total: 51–31 (home: 29–12; road: 22–19)
October: 1–2 (home: 1–0; road: 0–2)

Game	Date	Team	Score	High points	High rebounds	High assists	Location Attendance	Record
1	October 25	@ Portland	L 104–113	Joe Johnson (29)	Rudy Gobert (14)	George Hill (6)	Moda Center; 19,446	0–1
2	October 28	L.A. Lakers	W 96–89	George Hill (23)	Rudy Gobert (13)	George Hill (3)	Vivint Smart Home Arena; 19,911	1–1
3	October 30	@ L.A. Clippers	L 75–88	George Hill (18)	Derrick Favors (11)	Gobert, Johnson, Hill, Ingles (3)	Staples Center; 19,060	1–2

November : 10–6 (home: 5–4; road: 5–2)

Game	Date	Team	Score	High points	High rebounds	High assists	Location Attendance	Record
4	November 1	@ San Antonio	W 106–91	George Hill (22)	Rudy Gobert (12)	George Hill (7)	AT&T Center; 18,418	2–2
5	November 2	Dallas	W 97–81	George Hill (25)	Rudy Gobert (12)	George Hill (4)	Vivint Smart Home Arena; 19,318	3–2
6	November 4	San Antonio	L 86–100	Rodney Hood (18)	Rudy Gobert (8)	George Hill (4)	Vivint Smart Home Arena; 19,911	3–3
7	November 6	@ New York	W 114–109	Gordon Hayward (28)	Rudy Gobert (8)	George Hill (9)	Madison Square Garden; 19,812	4–3
8	November 7	@ Philadelphia	W 109–84	Gordon Hayward (20)	Derrick Favors (9)	Hayward, Mack (5)	Wells Fargo Center; 14,168	5–3
9	November 9	@ Charlotte	L 98–104	Gordon Hayward (29)	Rudy Gobert (11)	Shelvin Mack (5)	Spectrum Center; 15,712	5–4
10	November 11	@ Orlando	W 87–74	Gordon Hayward (20)	Rudy Gobert (13)	Gordon Hayward (8)	Amway Center; 18,846	6–4
11	November 12	@ Miami	W 102–91	Gordon Hayward (25)	Rudy Gobert (12)	Gordon Hayward (4)	American Airlines Arena; 19,600	7–4
12	November 14	Memphis	L 96–102	Joe Ingles (20)	Lyles, Gobert (5)	Shelvin Mack (4)	Vivint Smart Home Arena; 18,176	7–5
13	November 17	Chicago	L 77–85	Rudy Gobert (16)	Rudy Gobert (13)	Gordon Hayward (3)	Vivint Smart Home Arena; 19,911	7–6
14	November 19	@ Houston	L 102–111	Rodney Hood (25)	Rudy Gobert (14)	Shelvin Mack (7)	Toyota Center; 14,760	7–7
15	November 20	@ Denver	L 91–105	Gordon Hayward (25)	Hayward, Gobert (7)	Joe Ingles (4)	Pepsi Center; 12,565	7–8
16	November 23	Denver	W 108–83	Hayward, Hill (22)	Rudy Gobert (13)	Gordon Hayward (7)	Vivint Smart Home Arena; 19,229	8–8
17	November 25	Atlanta	W 95–68	Gordon Hayward (24)	Gobert, Lyles (10)	Shelvin Mack (5)	Vivint Smart Home Arena; 19,911	9–8
18	November 28	@ Minnesota	W 112–103	Hayward, Hill (24)	Rudy Gobert (17)	Hood, Diaw (5)	Target Center; 9,384	10–8
19	November 29	Houston	W 120–101	Gordon Hayward (31)	Rudy Gobert (14)	Gordon Hayward (7)	Vivint Smart Home Arena; 19,911	11–8

December : 10–5 (home: 7–4; road: 3–1)

Game	Date	Team	Score	High points	High rebounds	High assists	Location Attendance	Record
20	December 1	Miami	L 110–111	Gordon Hayward (32)	Rudy Gobert (12)	Gordon Hayward (7)	Vivint Smart Home Arena; 19,073	11–9
21	December 3	Denver	W 105–98	Gordon Hayward (32)	Rudy Gobert (11)	Ingles, Mack, Diaw (4)	Vivint Smart Home Arena; 19,911	12–9
22	December 5	@ L. A. Lakers	W 107–101	Gordon Hayward (23)	Rudy Gobert (17)	Shelvin Mack (7)	Staples Center; 18,279	13–9
23	December 6	Phoenix	W 112–105	Gordon Hayward (28)	Rudy Gobert (11)	Boris Diaw (6)	Vivint Smart Home Arena; 18,997	14–9
24	December 8	Golden State	L 99–106	Joe Ingles (21)	Rudy Gobert (17)	Exum, Mack (5)	Vivint Smart Home Arena; 19,911	14−10
25	December 10	Sacramento	W 104–84	Gordon Hayward (24)	Rudy Gobert (16)	Shelvin Mack (5)	Vivint Smart Home Arena; 19,331	15−10
26	December 14	Oklahoma City	W 109–89	Rodney Hood (25)	Rudy Gobert (12)	Boris Diaw (6)	Vivint Smart Home Arena; 19,911	16−10
27	December 16	Dallas	W 103–100	Rudy Gobert (16)	Rudy Gobert (10)	Gordon Hayward (4)	Vivint Smart Home Arena; 18,721	17−10
28	December 18	@ Memphis	W 82–73	Gordon Hayward (22)	Rudy Gobert (12)	Gordon Hayward (6)	FedExForum; 15,862	18–10
29	December 20	@ Golden State	L 74–104	Joe Johnson (14)	Rudy Gobert (16)	Joe Ingles (3)	Oracle Arena; 19,596	18−11
30	December 21	Sacramento	L 93–94	Gordon Hayward (28)	Rudy Gobert (14)	Boris Diaw (8)	Vivint Smart Home Arena; 19,195	18−12
31	December 23	Toronto	L 98–104	Gordon Hayward (23)	Rudy Gobert (14)	Joe Ingles (7)	Vivint Smart Home Arena; 19,911	18–13
32	December 27	@ L. A. Lakers	W 102–100	Gordon Hayward (31)	Rudy Gobert (11)	Hayward, Mack, Neto (3)	Staples Center; 18,997	19–13
33	December 29	Philadelphia	W 100–83	George Hill (21)	Rudy Gobert (13)	George Hill (6)	Vivint Smart Home Arena; 19,911	20–13
34	December 31	Phoenix	W 91–86	Hayward, Gobert (18)	Rudy Gobert (13)	Gordon Hayward (4)	Vivint Smart Home Arena; 19,911	21–13

January : 9–6 (home: 5–2; road: 4–4)

Game	Date	Team	Score	High points	High rebounds	High assists	Location Attendance	Record
35	January 2	@ Brooklyn	W 101–89	Gordon Hayward (30)	Rudy Gobert (16)	Gordon Hayward (3)	Barclays Center; 15,644	22–13
36	January 3	@ Boston	L 104–115	Gordon Hayward (23)	Rudy Gobert (13)	Derrick Favors (7)	TD Garden; 18,624	22–14
37	January 5	@ Toronto	L 93–101	Shelvin Mack (17)	Rudy Gobert (16)	Mack, Ingles (3)	Air Canada Centre; 19,800	22–15
38	January 7	@ Minnesota	W 94–92	George Hill (19)	Rudy Gobert (15)	George Hill (7)	Target Center; 13,945	23–15
39	January 8	@ Memphis	L 79–88	Gordon Hayward (22)	Rudy Gobert (13)	six players (2)	FedExForum; 16,112	23−16
40	January 10	Cleveland	W 100–92	Gordon Hayward (28)	Rudy Gobert (14)	George Hill (7)	Vivint Smart Home Arena; 19,911	24–16
41	January 13	Detroit	W 110–77	Rodney Hood (21)	Rudy Gobert (11)	Boris Diaw (5)	Vivint Smart Home Arena; 19,911	25–16
42	January 14	Orlando	W 114–107	Gordon Hayward (23)	Rudy Gobert (19)	Hayward, Hill (7)	Vivint Smart Home Arena; 19,911	26–16
43	January 16	@ Phoenix	W 106–101	Rudy Gobert (18)	Rudy Gobert (17)	Hayward, Ingles (5)	Talking Stick Resort Arena; 16,767	27–16
44	January 20	@ Dallas	W 112–107 (OT)	Gordon Hayward (26)	Rudy Gobert (27)	Hayward, Ingles (4)	American Airlines Center; 19,421	28–16
45	January 21	Indiana	W 109–100	George Hill (30)	Rudy Gobert (27)	Joe Ingles (6)	Vivint Smart Home Arena; 19,911	29–16
46	January 23	Oklahoma City	L 95–97	Gordon Hayward (17)	Rudy Gobert (10)	Boris Diaw (5)	Vivint Smart Home Arena; 19,911	29–17
47	January 24	@ Denver	L 93–103	Derrick Favors (18)	Rudy Gobert (9)	George Hill (5)	Pepsi Center; 10,867	29–18
48	January 26	L. A. Lakers	W 96–88	Gordon Hayward (24)	Rudy Gobert (13)	Favors, Hill (3)	Vivint Smart Home Arena; 19,911	30–18
49	January 28	Memphis	L 95–102	Rodney Hood (20)	Rudy Gobert (9)	Hayward, Hill (5)	Vivint Smart Home Arena; 19,911	30–19

February : 7–4 (home: 3–2; road: 4–2)

Game	Date	Team	Score	High points	High rebounds	High assists	Location Attendance	Record
50	February 1	Milwaukee	W 104–88	Gordon Hayward (27)	Rudy Gobert (15)	Hayward, Ingles, Johnson (5)	Vivint Smart Home Arena; 19,694	31–19
51	February 4	Charlotte	W 105–98	Gordon Hayward (33)	Rudy Gobert (15)	Joe Johnson (4)	Vivint Smart Home Arena; 19,911	32–19
52	February 6	@ Atlanta	W 120–95	Gordon Hayward (30)	Derrick Favors (10)	George Hill (8)	Philips Arena; 13,126	33–19
53	February 8	@ New Orleans	W 127–94	George Hill (19)	Rudy Gobert (16)	Dante Exum (5)	Smoothie King Center; 14,508	34–19
54	February 9	@ Dallas	L 105–112 (OT)	Gordon Hayward (36)	Rudy Gobert (15)	Shelvin Mack (7)	American Airlines Center; 19,883	34–20
55	February 11	Boston	L 104–112	Gordon Hayward (41)	Rudy Gobert (14)	Hill, Hayward (4)	Vivint Smart Home Arena; 19,911	34–21
56	February 13	L.A. Clippers	L 72–88	Derrick Favors (13)	Rudy Gobert (14)	Boris Diaw (4)	Vivint Smart Home Arena; 19,521	34–22
57	February 15	Portland	W 111–88	Gordon Hayward (22)	Rudy Gobert (12)	Gordon Hayward (7)	Vivint Smart Home Arena; 19,590	35–22
58	February 24	@ Milwaukee	W 109–95	Gordon Hayward (29)	Rudy Gobert (16)	Joe Ingles (5)	Bradley Center; 16,064	36–22
59	February 26	@ Washington	W 102–92	Gordon Hayward (30)	Rudy Gobert (20)	George Hill (6)	Verizon Center; 19,648	37–22
60	February 28	@ Oklahoma City	L 106–109	Gordon Hayward (19)	Rudy Gobert (10)	George Hill (8)	Chesapeake Energy Arena; 18,203	37–23

March : 10–6 (home: 6–1; road: 4–5)

Game	Date	Team	Score	High points	High rebounds	High assists	Location Attendance	Record
61	March 1	Minnesota	L 80–107	Dante Exum (15)	Derrick Favors (12)	Exum, Hill, Johnson (3)	Vivint Smart Home Arena; 19,590	37–24
62	March 3	Brooklyn	W 112–97	George Hill (34)	Derrick Favors (12)	George Hill (7)	Vivint Smart Home Arena; 19,911	38–24
63	March 5	@ Sacramento	W 110–109 (OT)	Rodney Hood (28)	Rudy Gobert (24)	George Hill (8)	Golden 1 Center; 17,608	39–24
64	March 6	New Orleans	W 88–83	Gordon Hayward (23)	Rudy Gobert (15)	Ingles, Diaw (5)	Vivint Smart Home Arena; 19,649	40–24
65	March 8	@ Houston	W 115–108	Hayward, Gobert (23)	Rudy Gobert (10)	Rudy Gobert (4)	Toyota Center; 16,230	41–24
66	March 11	@ Oklahoma City	L 104–112	Dante Exum (22)	Alec Burks (7)	Burks, Neto (2)	Chesapeake Energy Arena; 18,203	41–25
67	March 13	L. A. Clippers	W 114–108	Gordon Hayward (27)	Rudy Gobert (10)	George Hill (6)	Vivint Smart Home Arena; 18,428	42–25
68	March 15	@ Detroit	W 97–83	Gordon Hayward (26)	Hayward, Gobert (9)	Gordon Hayward (6)	The Palace of Auburn Hills; 14,033	43–25
69	March 16	@ Cleveland	L 83–91	Rudy Gobert (20)	Rudy Gobert (19)	Hayward, Ingles (4)	Quicken Loans Arena; 20,562	43–26
70	March 18	@ Chicago	L 86–95	George Hill (18)	Rudy Gobert (13)	Joe Ingles (5)	United Center; 21,953	43–27
71	March 20	@ Indiana	L 100–107	Gordon Hayward (38)	Rudy Gobert (14)	George Hill (6)	Bankers Life Fieldhouse; 15,458	43–28
72	March 22	New York	W 108–101	Rudy Gobert (35)	Rudy Gobert (13)	George Hill (4)	Vivint Smart Home Arena; 19,911	44–28
73	March 25	@ L. A. Clippers	L 95–108	Rudy Gobert (26)	Rudy Gobert (14)	Boris Diaw (5)	Staples Center; 19,060	44–29
74	March 27	New Orleans	W 108–100	Gobert, Hood (20)	Rudy Gobert (19)	George Hill (5)	Vivint Smart Home Arena; 18,924	45–29
75	March 29	@ Sacramento	W 112–82	Gordon Hayward (20)	Rudy Gobert (15)	Joe Ingles (5)	Golden 1 Center; 17,608	46–29
76	March 31	Washington	W 95–88	Gordon Hayward (19)	Rudy Gobert (10)	Boris Diaw (5)	Vivint Smart Home Arena; 19,911	47–29

April: 4–2 (home: 3–0; road: 1–2)

Game	Date	Team	Score	High points	High rebounds	High assists	Location Attendance	Record
77	April 2	@ San Antonio	L 103–109	Diaw, Gobert (19)	Rudy Gobert (14)	Rudy Gobert (5)	AT&T Center; 18,418	47–30
78	April 4	Portland	W 106–87	Gordon Hayward (30)	Rudy Gobert (11)	Diaw, Mack (5)	Vivint Smart Home Arena; 19,911	48–30
79	April 7	Minnesota	W 120–113	Gordon Hayward (39)	Shelvin Mack (6)	Joe Ingles (8)	Vivint Smart Home Arena; 19,911	49–30
80	April 8	@ Portland	L 86–101	Gordon Hayward (21)	Rudy Gobert (11)	Gordon Hayward (4)	Moda Center; 19,865	49–31
81	April 10	@ Golden State	W 105–99	George Hill (20)	Rudy Gobert (18)	Joe Ingles (7)	Oracle Arena; 19,596	50–31
82	April 12	San Antonio	W 101–97	Gordon Hayward (14)	Rudy Gobert (9)	George Hill (5)	Vivint Smart Home Arena; 19,911	51–31

2016–17 season schedule

=== Playoffs ===
2017 playoff game log
Total: 4–7 (home: 1–4; road: 3–3)
First Round: 4–3 (home: 1–2; road: 3–1)

Game	Date	Team	Score	High points	High rebounds	High assists	Location Attendance	Series
1	April 15	@ L.A. Clippers	W 97–95	Joe Johnson (21)	Gordon Hayward (10)	Boris Diaw (6)	Staples Center; 19,060	1–0
2	April 18	@ L.A. Clippers	L 91–99	Gordon Hayward (20)	Favors, Hill (7)	George Hill (4)	Staples Center; 19,060	1–1
3	April 21	L.A. Clippers	L 106–111	Gordon Hayward (40)	Gordon Hayward (8)	Joe Ingles (5)	Vivint Smart Home Arena; 19,911	1–2
4	April 23	L.A. Clippers	W 105–98	Joe Johnson (28)	Rudy Gobert (13)	Joe Ingles (11)	Vivint Smart Home Arena; 19,911	2–2
5	April 25	@ L.A. Clippers	W 96–92	Gordon Hayward (27)	Rudy Gobert (11)	George Hill (7)	Staples Center; 19,060	3–2
6	April 28	L.A. Clippers	L 93–98	Gordon Hayward (31)	Rudy Gobert (9)	Gordon Hayward (4)	Vivint Smart Home Arena; 19,911	3–3
7	April 30	@ L.A. Clippers	W 104–91	Gordon Hayward (26)	Derrick Favors (11)	Hill, Johnson (5)	Staples Center; 19,060	4–3

Conference Semifinals: 0–4 (home: 0–2; road: 0–2)

Game	Date	Team	Score	High points	High rebounds	High assists	Location Attendance	Series
1	May 2	@ Golden State	L 94–106	Rudy Gobert (13)	Rudy Gobert (13)	Hayward, Ingles, Mack (5)	Oracle Arena; 19,596	0–1
2	May 4	@ Golden State	L 104–115	Gordon Hayward (33)	Rudy Gobert (16)	Hayward, Mack (4)	Oracle Arena; 19,596	0–2
3	May 6	Golden State	L 91–102	Gordon Hayward (29)	Rudy Gobert (15)	Gordon Hayward (6)	Vivint Smart Home Arena; 19,911	0–3
4	May 8	Golden State	L 95–121	Gordon Hayward (25)	Rudy Gobert (13)	Hayward, Ingles (3)	Vivint Smart Home Arena; 19,911	0–4

2017 playoff schedule

== Player statistics ==
Legend
GP	Games played	GS	Games started	MPG	Minutes per game
FG%	Field-goal percentage	3P%	3-point field-goal percentage	FT%	Free-throw percentage
RPG	Rebounds per game	APG	Assists per game	SPG	Steals per game
BPG	Blocks per game	PPG	Points per game

=== Regular season ===
Player	GP	GS	MPG	FG%	3P%	FT%	RPG	APG	SPG	BPG	PPG
Joe Ingles	82	26	24.0	.452	.441	.735	3.2	2.7	1.2	.1	7.1
Rudy Gobert	81	81	33.9	.661	.000	.653	12.8	1.2	.6	2.6	14.0
Joe Johnson	78	14	23.6	.436	.411	.818	3.1	1.8	.5	.2	9.2
Gordon Hayward	73	73	34.5	.471	.398	.844	5.4	3.5	1.0	.3	21.9
Boris Diaw	73	33	17.6	.446	.247	.743	2.2	2.3	.2	.1	4.6
Trey Lyles	71	4	16.3	.362	.319	.722	3.3	1.0	.4	.3	6.2
Danté Exum	66	26	18.6	.427	.295	.795	2.0	1.7	.3	.2	6.2
Rodney Hood	59	55	27.0	.408	.371	.783	3.4	1.6	.6	.2	12.7
Shelvin Mack	55	9	21.9	.446	.308	.688	2.3	2.8	.8	.1	7.8
Jeff Withey	51	1	8.5	.534	.000	.750	2.4	.1	.3	.6	2.9
Derrick Favors	50	39	23.7	.487	.300	.615	6.1	1.1	.9	.8	9.5
George Hill	49	49	31.5	.477	.403	.801	3.4	4.2	1.0	.2	16.9
Alec Burks	42	0	15.5	.399	.329	.769	2.9	.7	.4	.1	6.7
Raul Neto	40	0	8.7	.451	.323	.889	.8	.9	.5	.1	2.5
Joel Bolomboy	12	0	4.4	.563	.250	.500	1.4	.2	.1	.2	1.8

=== Playoffs ===
Player	GP	GS	MPG	FG%	3P%	FT%	RPG	APG	SPG	BPG	PPG
Gordon Hayward	11	11	37.4	.441	.412	.934	6.1	3.4	.9	.3	24.1
Joe Ingles	11	11	30.4	.403	.366	.667	3.7	3.3	2.0	.5	6.5
Boris Diaw	11	9	18.5	.500	.429	.900	1.9	2.0	.6	.4	5.7
Joe Johnson	11	2	29.6	.436	.333	.733	3.9	2.5	.5	.1	12.9
Derrick Favors	11	2	20.5	.581		.478	5.5	.9	.7	.5	7.5
Rodney Hood	11	0	25.2	.352	.260	.611	2.7	1.1	.5	.0	8.9
Rudy Gobert	9	9	27.3	.635		.480	9.9	1.2	1.0	1.3	11.6
Shelvin Mack	9	3	17.2	.347	.467	.867	2.8	2.0	.4	.0	6.0
Raul Neto	9	0	6.7	.615	.500	1.000	.8	.4	.1	.1	2.6
George Hill	8	8	35.1	.469	.387	.724	4.1	3.6	.3	.1	15.6
Danté Exum	7	0	12.0	.407	.333	1.000	.9	1.3	.7	.0	4.6
Jeff Withey	3	0	7.0	.500		.500	1.3	.3	.3	.3	1.7
Trey Lyles	2	0	5.0	.429	.333		1.0	.5	.5	.0	3.5
Joel Bolomboy	2	0	4.5	.667			1.0	.0	.0	.5	2.0

== Transactions ==
=== Trades ===
June 23, 2016	To Utah Jazz Draft rights to Marcus Paige; Cash considerations	To Brooklyn Nets Draft rights to Isaiah Whitehead
July 7, 2016	To Utah Jazz 2021 2nd round-pick	To Washington Wizards Trey Burke
July 8, 2016	To Utah Jazz Boris Diaw; 2022 2nd round-pick Cash considerations	To San Antonio Spurs Draft rights to Olivier Hanlan

=== Free agency ===
==== Additions ====
Player	Signed	Former team
Joe Johnson	2-year contract worth $22 million	Miami Heat

==== Subtractions ====
Player	Reason left	New team
Trevor Booker	2-year contract worth $18 million	Brooklyn Nets
