= 2016–17 Sacramento Kings season =

NBA professional basketball team season

- Head coach: Dave Joerger
- General manager: Vlade Divac
- Owner: Vivek Ranadivé
- Arena: Golden 1 Center

Results
- Record: 32–50 (.390)
- Place: Division: 3rd (Pacific); Conference: 12th (Western)
- Playoff finish: Did not qualify
- Stats at Basketball Reference

Local media
- Television: Comcast SportsNet California
- Radio: KHTK Sports 1140

The 2016–17 Sacramento Kings season was the 72nd season of the franchise, its 68th season in the National Basketball Association (NBA), and its 32nd in Sacramento. It was their first season at Golden 1 Center. On May 10, 2016, the Kings hired Dave Joerger as their new head coach.

The team formally changed their jerseys prior to the start of the season, which darkened the shade of purple while having silver panels.

== Draft picks ==
Round	Pick	Player	Position	Nationality	College / Club
1	13	Georgios Papagiannis	C	Greece	(Greece) Panathanikos Athens
1	22	Malachi Richardson	SG	United States	Syracuse
1	28	Skal Labissière	PF/C	Haiti	Kentucky
2	59	Isaiah Cousins	PG/SG	United States	Oklahoma

== Roster ==
2016–17 Sacramento Kings roster
Players

Pos.	No.	Player	Height	Weight	DOB	From
SG	40	Arron Afflalo	6 ft 5 in (1.96 m)	210 lb (95 kg)	1985-10-15	UCLA
C	00	Willie Cauley-Stein	7 ft 0 in (2.13 m)	240 lb (109 kg)	1993-08-18	Kentucky
PG	7	Darren Collison	6 ft 0 in (1.83 m)	175 lb (79 kg)	1987-08-23	UCLA
SF	32	Tyreke Evans	6 ft 6 in (1.98 m)	220 lb (100 kg)	1989-09-19	Memphis
PG	9	Langston Galloway	6 ft 2 in (1.88 m)	200 lb (91 kg)	1991-12-09	Saint Joseph's
SF	8	Rudy Gay (injured)	6 ft 8 in (2.03 m)	230 lb (104 kg)	1986-08-17	Connecticut
SG	24	Buddy Hield	6 ft 4 in (1.93 m)	214 lb (97 kg)	1993-12-17	Oklahoma
C	41	Kosta Koufos	7 ft 0 in (2.13 m)	265 lb (120 kg)	1989-02-24	Ohio State
PF	3	Skal Labissière	6 ft 11 in (2.11 m)	225 lb (102 kg)	1996-03-18	Kentucky
PG	10	Ty Lawson	5 ft 11 in (1.80 m)	195 lb (88 kg)	1987-11-03	North Carolina
SG	23	Ben McLemore	6 ft 5 in (1.96 m)	195 lb (88 kg)	1993-02-11	Kansas
C	13	Georgios Papagiannis	7 ft 3 in (2.21 m)	240 lb (109 kg)	1997-07-03	American School (GRE)
SG	5	Malachi Richardson (injured)	6 ft 6 in (1.98 m)	205 lb (93 kg)	1996-01-05	Syracuse
SG	17	Garrett Temple	6 ft 6 in (1.98 m)	195 lb (88 kg)	1986-05-08	LSU
PF	43	Anthony Tolliver	6 ft 8 in (2.03 m)	240 lb (109 kg)	1985-06-01	Creighton

Coaches
Head coach
- Dave Joerger
Assistant(s)
- Bryan Gates
- Nancy Lieberman
- Jason March
- Bob Thornton
- Duane Ticknor
- Elston Turner
- Larry Lewis (player development)

Legend
- (DP) Unsigned draft pick
- (FA) Free agent
- (S) Suspended
- (DL) On assignment to D-League affiliate
- Injured

Roster
Updated: 2017-03-12

== Standings ==
=== Division ===
Pacific Division	W	L	PCT	GB	Home	Road	Div	GP
z – Golden State Warriors	67	15	.817	–	36‍–‍5	31‍–‍10	14–2	82
x – Los Angeles Clippers	51	31	.622	16.0	29‍–‍12	22‍–‍19	10–6	82
e – Sacramento Kings	32	50	.390	35.0	17‍–‍24	15‍–‍26	7–9	82
e – Los Angeles Lakers	26	56	.317	41.0	17‍–‍24	9‍–‍32	6–10	82
e – Phoenix Suns	24	58	.293	43.0	15‍–‍26	9‍–‍32	3–13	82

=== Conference ===
Western Conference
#	Team	W	L	PCT	GB	GP
1	z – Golden State Warriors *	67	15	.817	–	82
2	y – San Antonio Spurs *	61	21	.744	6.0	82
3	x – Houston Rockets	55	27	.671	12.0	82
4	x – Los Angeles Clippers	51	31	.622	16.0	82
5	y – Utah Jazz *	51	31	.622	16.0	82
6	x – Oklahoma City Thunder	47	35	.573	20.0	82
7	x – Memphis Grizzlies	43	39	.524	24.0	82
8	x – Portland Trail Blazers	41	41	.500	26.0	82
9	e – Denver Nuggets	40	42	.488	27.0	82
10	e – New Orleans Pelicans	34	48	.415	33.0	82
11	e – Dallas Mavericks	33	49	.402	34.0	82
12	e – Sacramento Kings	32	50	.390	35.0	82
13	e – Minnesota Timberwolves	31	51	.378	36.0	82
14	e – Los Angeles Lakers	26	56	.317	41.0	82
15	e – Phoenix Suns	24	58	.293	43.0	82

== Game log ==
=== Pre-season ===
2016 pre-season game log
Total: 3–3 (Home: 2–1; Road: 1–2)
Pre-season: 3–3 (home: 2–1; road: 1–2)

Game	Date	Team	Score	High points	High rebounds	High assists	Location Attendance	Record
1	October 4	@ L.A. Lakers	L 84–103	Arron Afflalo (14)	DeMarcus Cousins (6)	DeMarcus Cousins (4)	Honda Center (Anaheim); 9,187	0–1
2	October 6	@ Golden State	L 96–105	DeMarcus Cousins (20)	Matt Barnes (8)	Matt Barnes (4)	SAP Center; 18,234	0–2
3	October 10	Maccabi Haifa	W 135–96	Ben McLemore (18)	Ty Lawson (7)	Ty Lawson (8)	Golden 1 Center; 16,000	1–2
4	October 13	@ L.A. Lakers	W 116–104	Anthony Tolliver (21)	Rudy Gay (9)	Collison, Gay (7)	T-Mobile Arena (Las Vegas); 8,905	2–2
5	October 15	Washington	W 124–119	Collison, Cousins (22)	Cousins, Cauley-Stein, Tolliver (22)	Darren Collison (8)	Rupp Arena (Lexington); 8,472	3–2
6	October 18	@ L.A. Clippers	L 89–92	DeMarcus Cousins (23)	Cousins, Cauley-Stein (8)	Ben McLemore (5)	Golden 1 Center; 16,000	3–3

2016–17 season schedule

=== Regular season ===
2016–17 game log
Total: 32–50 (Home: 16–25; Road: 15–26)
October: 2–2 (home: 1–1; road: 1–1)

Game	Date	Team	Score	High points	High rebounds	High assists	Location Attendance	Record
1	October 26	@ Phoenix	W 113–94	DeMarcus Cousins (24)	Matt Barnes (7)	Ty Lawson (7)	Talking Stick Resort Arena; 18,055	1–0
2	October 27	San Antonio	L 94–102	DeMarcus Cousins (37)	DeMarcus Cousins (16)	Ty Lawson (9)	Golden 1 Center; 17,608	1–1
3	October 29	Minnesota	W 106–103	DeMarcus Cousins (29)	Kosta Koufos (8)	Matt Barnes (9)	Golden 1 Center; 17,608	2–1
4	October 31	@ Atlanta	L 95–106	Rudy Gay (22)	DeMarcus Cousins (12)	Ty Lawson (6)	Philips Arena; 12,501	2–2

November : 5–9 (home: 3–4; road: 2–5)

Game	Date	Team	Score	High points	High rebounds	High assists	Location Attendance	Record
5	November 1	@ Miami	L 96–108 (OT)	Gay, Cousins (30)	Rudy Gay (12)	Lawson, Cousins (4)	American Airlines Arena; 19,612	2–3
6	November 3	@ Orlando	L 94–102	DeMarcus Cousins (33)	Lawson, Koufos, Cousins (7)	Ty Lawson (4)	Amway Center; 17,026	2–4
7	November 5	@ Milwaukee	L 91–117	Garrett Temple (19)	Kosta Koufos (7)	Jordan Farmar (7)	BMO Harris Bradley Center; 16,021	2–5
8	November 6	@ Toronto	W 96–91	DeMarcus Cousins (22)	DeMarcus Cousins (14)	Ty Lawson (11)	Air Canada Centre; 19,800	3–5
9	November 8	New Orleans	W 102–94	DeMarcus Cousins (28)	Matt Barnes (8)	Rudy Gay (6)	Golden 1 Center; 17,608	4−5
10	November 10	L.A. Lakers	L 91–101	DeMarcus Cousins (28)	DeMarcus Cousins (9)	Darren Collison (9)	Golden 1 Center; 17,608	4−6
11	November 11	@ Portland	L 120–122 (OT)	DeMarcus Cousins (33)	Rudy Gay (14)	Lawson, Collison (4)	Moda Center; 19,918	4−7
12	November 16	San Antonio	L 105–110	DeMarcus Cousins (26)	DeMarcus Cousins (17)	Cousins, Collison (6)	Golden 1 Center; 17,608	4–8
13	November 18	L.A. Clippers	L 115–121	DeMarcus Cousins (38)	DeMarcus Cousins (13)	Ty Lawson (8)	Golden 1 Center; 17,608	4−9
14	November 20	Toronto	W 102–99	Rudy Gay (23)	DeMarcus Cousins (10)	Darren Collison (9)	Golden 1 Center; 17,608	5−9
15	November 23	Oklahoma City	W 116–101	DeMarcus Cousins (36)	DeMarcus Cousins (13)	Darren Collison (6)	Golden 1 Center; 17,608	6−9
16	November 25	Houston	L 104–117	DeMarcus Cousins (32)	DeMarcus Cousins (9)	Afflalo, Casspi (5)	Golden 1 Center; 17,608	6−10
17	November 27	@ Brooklyn	W 122–105	DeMarcus Cousins (37)	DeMarcus Cousins (11)	Rudy Gay (8)	Barclays Center; 13,646	7−10
18	November 28	@ Washington	L 95–101 (OT)	DeMarcus Cousins (36)	DeMarcus Cousins (20)	DeMarcus Cousins (4)	Verizon Center; 12,571	7−11

December : 7–8 (home: 3–2; road: 4–6)

Game	Date	Team	Score	High points	High rebounds	High assists	Location Attendance	Record
19	December 2	@ Boston	L 92–97	DeMarcus Cousins (28)	Matt Barnes (16)	Matt Barnes (5)	TD Garden; 18,624	7−12
20	December 4	@ New York	L 98–106	DeMarcus Cousins (36)	DeMarcus Cousins (12)	Darren Collison (6)	Madison Square Garden; 19,812	7–13
21	December 7	@ Dallas	W 120–89	DeMarcus Cousins (24)	DeMarcus Cousins (14)	DeMarcus Cousins (7)	American Airlines Center; 19,711	8–13
22	December 9	New York	L 100–103	DeMarcus Cousins (28)	DeMarcus Cousins (12)	Cousins, Lawson (6)	Golden 1 Center; 17,608	8−14
23	December 10	@ Utah	L 84–104	Rudy Gay (20)	DeMarcus Cousins (10)	Cousins, Lawson (4)	Vivint Smart Home Arena; 19,331	8−15
24	December 12	L. A. Lakers	W 116–92	DeMarcus Cousins (31)	DeMarcus Cousins (16)	Cousins, Lawson (5)	Golden 1 Center; 17,608	9–15
25	December 14	@ Houston	L 98–132	Garrett Temple (20)	Anthony Tolliver (10)	Darren Collison (9)	Toyota Center; 15,039	9–16
26	December 16	@ Memphis	W 96–92	DeMarcus Cousins (22)	Kosta Koufos (13)	Darren Collison (9)	FedExForum; 15,987	10–16
27	December 18	@ Dallas	L 79–99	DeMarcus Cousins (33)	Kosta Koufos (9)	Garrett Temple (7)	American Airlines Center; 19,504	10–17
28	December 20	Portland	W 126–121	DeMarcus Cousins (55)	DeMarcus Cousins (13)	Ty Lawson (8)	Golden 1 Center; 17,608	11–17
29	December 21	@ Utah	W 94–93	DeMarcus Cousins (21)	DeMarcus Cousins (8)	Afflalo, Cousins (3)	American Airlines Center; 19,504	12–17
30	December 23	@ Minnesota	W 109–105	DeMarcus Cousins (32)	DeMarcus Cousins (7)	DeMarcus Cousins (7)	Target Center; 13,288	13–17
31	December 26	Philadelphia	W 102–100	DeMarcus Cousins (30)	Rudy Gay (9)	DeMarcus Cousins (5)	Golden 1 Center; 17,608	14–17
32	December 28	@ Portland	L 89–102	DeMarcus Cousins (28)	Kosta Koufos (10)	DeMarcus Cousins (6)	Moda Center; 19,665	14–18
33	December 31	Memphis	L 98–112	DeMarcus Cousins (26)	Koufos, Barnes (8)	DeMarcus Cousins (8)	Golden 1 Center; 17,608	14–19

January : 5–11 (home: 1–6; road: 4–5)

Game	Date	Team	Score	High points	High rebounds	High assists	Location Attendance	Record
34	January 3	@ Denver	W 120–113	DeMarcus Cousins (31)	Cousins, Temple (6)	Darren Collison (9)	Pepsi Center; 11,018	15–19
35	January 4	Miami	L 102–107	Afflalo, Temple, Lawson (15)	Matt Barnes (7)	Ty Lawson (6)	Golden 1 Center; 17,608	15–20
36	January 6	LA Clippers	L 98–106	DeMarcus Cousins (25)	DeMarcus Cousins (11)	DeMarcus Cousins (7)	Golden 1 Center; 17,608	15–21
37	January 8	Golden State	L 106–117	Rudy Gay (23)	DeMarcus Cousins (10)	DeMarcus Cousins (5)	Golden 1 Center; 17,608	15−22
38	January 10	Detroit	W 100–94	DeMarcus Cousins (24)	DeMarcus Cousins (13)	DeMarcus Cousins (6)	Golden 1 Center; 17,608	16−22
39	January 13	Cleveland	L 108–120	DeMarcus Cousins (26)	Rudy Gay (10)	DeMarcus Cousins (11)	Golden 1 Center; 17,608	16–23
40	January 15	Oklahoma City	L 118–122	DeMarcus Cousins (31)	DeMarcus Cousins (11)	DeMarcus Cousins (7)	Golden 1 Center; 17,608	16–24
41	January 18	Indiana	L 100–106	DeMarcus Cousins (25)	DeMarcus Cousins (12)	DeMarcus Cousins (10)	Golden 1 Center; 17,608	16–25
42	January 20	@ Memphis	L 91–107	DeMarcus Cousins (19)	DeMarcus Cousins (10)	Ty Lawson (5)	FedExForum; 16,991	16–26
43	January 21	@ Chicago	L 99–102	DeMarcus Cousins (42)	DeMarcus Cousins (14)	Ty Lawson (6)	United Center; 21,606	16–27
44	January 23	@ Detroit	W 109–104	DeMarcus Cousins (22)	DeMarcus Cousins (14)	Cousins, Lawson (6)	The Palace of Auburn Hills; 14,017	17–27
45	January 25	@ Cleveland	W 116–112 (OT)	DeMarcus Cousins (28)	DeMarcus Cousins (11)	DeMarcus Cousins (9)	Quicken Loans Arena; 20,562	18–27
46	January 27	@ Indiana	L 111–115 (OT)	Cousins, Collison (26)	DeMarcus Cousins (16)	Cousins, Collison (5)	Bankers Life Fieldhouse; 17,522	18–28
47	January 28	@ Charlotte	W 109–106	DeMarcus Cousins (35)	DeMarcus Cousins (18)	Ty Lawson (9)	Spectrum Center; 18,597	19–28
48	January 30	@ Philadelphia	L 119–122	DeMarcus Cousins (46)	DeMarcus Cousins (15)	Ty Lawson (11)	Wells Fargo Center; 15,840	19–29
49	January 31	@ Houston	L 83–105	DeMarcus Cousins (16)	Matt Barnes (11)	DeMarcus Cousins (5)	Toyota Center; 15,182	19–30

February : 6–5 (home: 5–4; road: 1–1)

Game	Date	Team	Score	High points	High rebounds	High assists	Location Attendance	Record
50	February 3	Phoenix	L 103–105	DeMarcus Cousins (22)	DeMarcus Cousins (12)	DeMarcus Cousins (12)	Golden 1 Center; 17,608	19–31
51	February 4	Golden State	W 109–106 (OT)	DeMarcus Cousins (32)	Matt Barnes (14)	DeMarcus Cousins (9)	Golden 1 Center; 17,608	20–31
52	February 6	Chicago	L 107–112	DeMarcus Cousins (18)	DeMarcus Cousins (14)	Ty Lawson (7)	Golden 1 Center; 17,608	20–32
53	February 8	Boston	W 108–92	Darren Collison (26)	Kosta Koufos (11)	Darren Collison (5)	Golden 1 Center; 17,608	21–32
54	February 10	Atlanta	W 108–107	DeMarcus Cousins (22)	DeMarcus Cousins (11)	DeMarcus Cousins (7)	Golden 1 Center; 17,608	22–32
55	February 12	New Orleans	W 105–99	DeMarcus Cousins (28)	DeMarcus Cousins (14)	Darren Collison (8)	Golden 1 Center; 17,608	23–32
56	February 14	@ L. A. Lakers	W 97–96	DeMarcus Cousins (40)	DeMarcus Cousins (12)	Cousins, Collison (8)	STAPLES Center; 19,997	24–32
57	February 15	@ Golden State	L 86–109	Matt Barnes (15)	Matt Barnes (14)	DeMarcus Cousins (6)	Oracle Arena; 19,596	24–33
58	February 23	Denver	W 116–100	Willie Cauley-Stein (29)	Willie Cauley-Stein (10)	Darren Collison (10)	Golden 1 Center; 17,608	25–33
59	February 25	Charlotte	L 85–99	Ben McLemore (18)	Skal Labissière (13)	Collison, Evans (5)	Golden 1 Center; 17,608	25–34
60	February 27	Minnesota	L 88–102	McLemore, Cauley-Stein (14)	Kosta Koufos (11)	Ty Lawson (9)	Golden 1 Center; 17,608	25–35

March : 4–12 (home: 2–6; road: 2–6)

Game	Date	Team	Score	High points	High rebounds	High assists	Location Attendance	Record
61	March 1	Brooklyn	L 100–109	Buddy Hield (16)	Anthony Tolliver (6)	Ty Lawson (9)	Golden 1 Center; 17,608	25–36
62	March 5	Utah	L 109–110 (OT)	Ty Lawson (19)	Kosta Koufos (10)	Collison, Lawson (5)	Golden 1 Center; 17,608	25–37
63	March 6	@ Denver	L 96–108	Darren Collison (17)	Kosta Koufos (10)	Ty Lawson (6)	Pepsi Center; 11,614	25–38
64	March 8	@ San Antonio	L 104–114	Tyreke Evans (26)	Kosta Koufos (10)	Evans, Collison (4)	AT&T Center; 18,418	25–39
65	March 10	Washington	L 122–130 (OT)	Willie Cauley-Stein (20)	Willie Cauley-Stein (13)	Darren Collison (10)	Golden 1 Center; 17,608	25–40
66	March 11	Denver	L 92–105	Buddy Hield (17)	Kosta Koufos (10)	Cauley-Stein, Collison (5)	Golden 1 Center; 17,608	25–41
67	March 13	Orlando	W 120–115	Darren Collison (19)	Cauley-Stein, Labissière (7)	Darren Collison (13)	Golden 1 Center; 17,608	26–41
68	March 15	@ Phoenix	W 107–101	Skal Labissière (32)	Cauley-Stein, Labissière (11)	Ty Lawson (6)	Talking Stick Resort Arena; 17,196	27–41
69	March 18	@ Oklahoma City	L 94–110	Georgios Papagiannis (14)	Georgios Papagiannis (11)	Ty Lawson (6)	Chesapeake Energy Arena; 18,203	27–42
70	March 19	@ San Antonio	L 102–118	Hield, Cauley-Stein (18)	Georgios Papagiannis (10)	Ty Lawson (6)	AT&T Center; 18,418	27–43
71	March 22	Milwaukee	L 98–116	Buddy Hield (21)	Skal Labissière (8)	Darren Collison (7)	Golden 1 Center; 17,608	27–44
72	March 24	@ Golden State	L 100–114	Buddy Hield (22)	Skal Labissière (10)	Skal Labissière (8)	Oracle Arena; 19,596	27−45
73	March 26	@ L. A. Clippers	W 98–97	Darren Collison (19)	Willie Cauley-Stein (14)	Garrett Temple (5)	Staples Center; 19,060	28−45
74	March 27	Memphis	W 91–90	Darren Collison (23)	Willie Cauley-Stein (9)	Darren Collison (7)	Golden 1 Center; 17,608	29–45
75	March 29	Utah	L 82–112	Ben McLemore (22)	Willie Cauley-Stein (8)	Ty Lawson (3)	Golden 1 Center; 17,608	29–46
76	March 31	@ New Orleans	L 89–117	Ben McLemore (15)	Willie Cauley-Stein (14)	Darren Collison (5)	Smoothie King Center; 17,304	29–47

April : 3–3 (home: 1–1; road: 2–2)

Game	Date	Team	Score	High points	High rebounds	High assists	Location Attendance	Record
77	April 1	@ Minnesota	W 123–117	Buddy Hield (22)	Willie Cauley-Stein (10)	Ty Lawson (11)	Target Center; 18,960	30–47
78	April 4	Dallas	W 98–87	Ben McLemore (22)	Willie Cauley-Stein (16)	Evans, Temple (5)	Golden 1 Center; 17,608	31–47
79	April 7	@ L. A. Lakers	L 94–98	Skal Labissière (19)	Georgios Papagiannis (10)	Darren Collison (10)	Staples Center; 18,997	31–48
80	April 9	Houston	L 128–135	Skal Labissière (25)	Willie Cauley-Stein (10)	Ty Lawson (11)	Golden 1 Center; 17,608	31–49
81	April 11	Phoenix	W 129–104	Buddy Hield (30)	Ty Lawson (11)	Ty Lawson (12)	Golden 1 Center; 17,608	32–49
82	April 12	@ L. A. Clippers	L 95–115	Willie Cauley-Stein (19)	Willie Cauley-Stein (14)	Afflalo, Galloway, Cauley-Stein (6)	Staples Center; 19,060	32–50

2016–17 season schedule

== Player statistics ==
Legend
GP	Games played	GS	Games started	MPG	Minutes per game
FG%	Field-goal percentage	3P%	3-point field-goal percentage	FT%	Free-throw percentage
RPG	Rebounds per game	APG	Assists per game	SPG	Steals per game
BPG	Blocks per game	PPG	Points per game

=== Regular season ===
Player	GP	GS	MPG	FG%	3P%	FT%	RPG	APG	SPG	BPG	PPG
Willie Cauley-Stein	75	21	18.9	.530	.000	.669	4.5	1.1	.7	.6	8.1
Kosta Koufos	71	62	20.0	.551	.000	.613	5.7	.7	.5	.7	6.6
Ty Lawson	69	24	25.1	.454	.288	.797	2.6	4.8	1.1	.1	9.9
Darren Collison	68	64	30.3	.476	.417	.860	2.2	4.6	1.0	.1	13.2
Garrett Temple	65	20	26.6	.424	.373	.784	2.8	2.6	1.3	.4	7.8
Anthony Tolliver	65	9	22.7	.442	.391	.744	3.6	1.2	.5	.3	7.1
Arron Afflalo	61	45	25.9	.440	.411	.892	2.0	1.3	.3	.1	8.4
Ben McLemore	61	27	19.3	.430	.382	.753	2.1	.8	.5	.1	8.1
DeMarcus Cousins^{†}	55	55	34.4	.452	.356	.770	10.6	4.8	1.4	1.3	27.8
Matt Barnes^{†}	54	13	25.3	.384	.327	.758	5.4	2.8	.7	.3	7.6
Skal Labissière	33	12	18.5	.537	.375	.703	4.9	.8	.5	.4	8.8
Rudy Gay	30	30	33.8	.455	.372	.855	6.3	2.8	1.5	.9	18.7
Buddy Hield^{†}	25	18	29.1	.480	.428	.814	4.1	1.8	.8	.1	15.1
Omri Casspi^{†}	22	2	18.0	.453	.379	.571	4.1	1.2	.5	.0	5.9
Georgios Papagiannis	22	0	16.1	.549	.000	.857	3.9	.9	.1	.8	5.6
Malachi Richardson	22	0	9.0	.412	.286	.789	1.0	.5	.2	.0	3.6
Langston Galloway^{†}	19	2	19.7	.404	.475	.917	1.8	1.5	.3	.1	6.0
Tyreke Evans^{†}	14	6	22.4	.413	.438	.706	3.6	2.4	.9	.4	11.6
Jordan Farmar	2	0	17.5	.333	.444		1.5	4.5	1.0	.0	6.0

- ^{†} Denotes player spent time with another team in the season. Stats reflect time with the Kings only.

== Transactions ==
=== Trades ===
June 23, 2016	To Sacramento Kings Draft rights to Georgios Papagiannis; Draft rights to Skal Labissière; Player rights to Bogdan Bogdanović; 2020 Detroit Pistons 2nd round-pick	To Phoenix Suns Draft rights to Marquese Chriss
July 7, 2016	To Sacramento Kings Draft rights to Malachi Richardson	To Charlotte Hornets Marco Belinelli

=== Free agency ===
==== Additions ====
Player	Signed	Former team
Arron Afflalo	2-year contract worth $25 million	New York Knicks
Garrett Temple	3-year contract worth $24 million	Washington Wizards
Matt Barnes	2-year contract worth $12 million	Memphis Grizzlies
Anthony Tolliver	2-year contract worth $16 million	Detroit Pistons
Ty Lawson	1-year contract worth $1,315,448	Indiana Pacers

==== Subtractions ====
Player	Reason left	New team
Rajon Rondo	2-year contract worth $28 million	Chicago Bulls
Seth Curry	2-year contract worth $6 million	Dallas Mavericks
Quincy Acy	2-year contract worth $2.2 million	Dallas Mavericks
Duje Dukan	Waived	(Croatia) Cedevita Zagreb
Isaiah Cousins	Waived	Reno Bighorns
Jordan Farmar	Waived	Sacramento Kings
DeMarcus Cousins	Traded	New Orleans Pelicans
