= Wayne Selden Jr. =

American basketball player (born 1994)

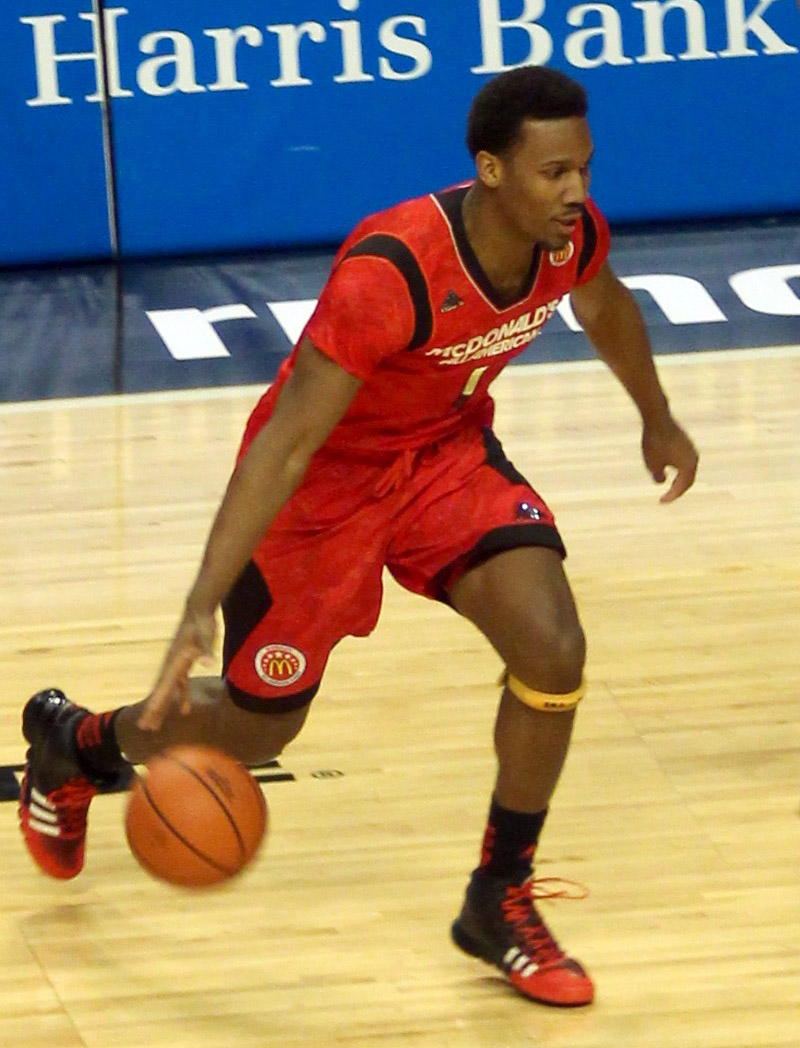
- Selden in the 2013 McDonald's All-American Boys Game

Free agent
- Position: Shooting guard / small forward

Personal information
- Born: September 30, 1994 (age 31) Roxbury, Massachusetts, U.S.
- Listed height: 6 ft 4 in (1.93 m)
- Listed weight: 229 lb (104 kg)

Career information
- High school: John D. O'Bryant (Roxbury, Massachusetts); Tilton School (Tilton, New Hampshire)
- College: Kansas (2013–2016)
- NBA draft: 2016: undrafted
- Playing career: 2016–present

Career history
- 2016–2017: Iowa Energy
- 2017: New Orleans Pelicans
- 2017–2019: Memphis Grizzlies
- 2017: →Memphis Hustle
- 2019: Chicago Bulls
- 2020: South Bay Lakers
- 2020–2021: Ironi Ness Ziona
- 2021–2022: New York Knicks
- 2022: HDI Sigorta Afyon Belediye
- 2022: Ironi Ness Ziona
- 2022: Scaligera Verona
- 2022: Manisa BB
- 2023: NLEX Road Warriors
- 2023: Gigantes de Carolina
- 2023: Hong Kong Bulls
- 2024: Taipei Fubon Braves
- 2024: Chorale Roanne

Career highlights
- FIBA Europe Cup Final Four MVP (2021); FIBA Europe Cup champion (2021); Second-team All-Big 12 (2016); McDonald's All-American (2013)
- Stats at NBA.com
- Stats at Basketball Reference
Medals
Men's basketball
Representing United States
Summer Universiade
Gold medal – first place	2015 Gwangju	Team competition

Wayne Anthony Selden Jr. (born September 30, 1994) is an American professional basketball player who last played for the Chorale Roanne. He played college basketball for the Kansas Jayhawks.

== High school career ==
Selden first attended John D. O'Bryant as a freshman before transferring to Tilton School, where he reclassified to the class of 2014 and repeated the ninth grade. In 2012, he reclassified back to the class of 2013. He averaged 24.8 points, 10.1 rebounds and four assists during his senior year, earning McDonald's All-American. He was the East team's second-leading scorer in the McDonald's All-American game, going 5-for-7 from the field, 2-for-4 from three-point range, for 13 points with five rebounds and three assists and played in the Jordan Brand Classic game. When he graduated, he was considered a five-star player and was ranked No. 14 on the ESPN 100 and No. 12 by Rivals.com.

== College career ==
Selden played three years of college basketball for the Kansas Jayhawks. As a junior in 2015–16, he earned second-team All-Big 12 honors and was named to the 35-man midseason watchlist for the Naismith Trophy. He appeared in 38 games (37 starts) for the Jayhawks during his junior season and averaged 13.8 points, 3.4 rebounds and 2.6 assists in 29.9 minutes while shooting 47.4 percent from the field, 39.2 percent from three-point range and 61.2 percent from the free throw line.

On March 29, 2016, Selden declared for the NBA draft, forgoing his final year of college eligibility.

== Professional career ==
=== Iowa Energy (2016–2017) ===
After going undrafted in the 2016 NBA draft, Selden signed with the Memphis Grizzlies on August 8, 2016. He was waived by the Grizzlies on October 22, 2016, after appearing in five preseason games. Seven days later, he was acquired by the Iowa Energy of the NBA Development League as an affiliate of the Grizzlies. In 35 games for Iowa, he averaged 18.5 points, 4.8 rebounds and 2.9 assists in 30.6 minutes.

=== New Orleans Pelicans (2017) ===
On March 8, 2017, Selden signed a 10-day contract with the New Orleans Pelicans. He made his NBA debut six days later, recording two points, three rebounds and one assist in 15 minutes as a starter in a 100–77 win over the Portland Trail Blazers. On March 17, 2017, in his third career NBA game, Selden scored 11 points in a 128–112 win over the Houston Rockets.

=== Memphis Grizzlies (2017–2019) ===
On March 18, 2017, following the expiration of his 10-day contract with New Orleans, Selden signed a multi-year contract with the Memphis Grizzlies. On April 7, 2017, he scored a career-high 13 points in a 101–88 win over the New York Knicks. In his playoff debut on April 15, 2017, he recorded five points, three rebounds, one assist and one steal while starting in Game 1 of the Grizzlies' first-round match-up with the San Antonio Spurs.

On July 1, 2017, Selden signed a new multi-year contract with the Grizzlies. On November 10, 2017, he was assigned to the Memphis Hustle of the NBA G League. He played that night and was recalled by the Grizzlies the following day. Selden missed much of the first half of the 2017–18 season with a right quad injury. On January 20, 2018, he scored a career-high 31 points in a 111–104 loss to the New Orleans Pelicans.

=== Chicago Bulls (2019) ===
On January 3, 2019, Selden was traded, along with MarShon Brooks and the Grizzlies' 2019 and 2020 second-round picks, to the Chicago Bulls in exchange for Justin Holiday.

=== South Bay Lakers (2020) ===
On January 17, 2020, Selden was signed by the South Bay Lakers. Selden tallied 28 points, seven rebounds, three assists and a block in a win over the Iowa Wolves on February 25. He suffered a knee injury on February 29 against the Agua Caliente Clippers and missed the remainder of the season.

=== Ironi Ness Ziona (2020–2021) ===
On December 8, 2020, Selden was signed by Ironi Nes Ziona of Israel. With Nes Ziona, he won the FIBA Europe Cup and was named Final Four MVP in the process.

=== New York Knicks (2021–2022) ===
On September 25, 2021, Selden signed with the New York Knicks. On January 3, 2022, he was waived.

=== Afyon Belediye (2022) ===
On January 20, 2022, Selden signed with Afyon Belediye of the Basketball Super League.

=== Return to Ironi (2022) ===
On April 5, 2022, Selden signed with Ironi Ness Ziona for his second stint with the team.

=== Scaligera Verona (2022) ===
On July 30, 2022, he signed with Scaligera Verona in the Serie A2 Basket.

=== Manisa Büyükşehir Belediyespor (2022) ===
On November 14, 2022, he signed with Manisa BB of the Turkish Basketbol Süper Ligi.

=== NLEX Road Warriors (2023) ===
In February 2023, he signed with the NLEX Road Warriors of the Philippine Basketball Association (PBA) to replace Jonathon Simmons as the team's import for the 2023 PBA Governors' Cup.

=== Gigantes de Carolina (2023) ===
On June 16, 2023, Selden signed with Gigantes de Carolina of the Baloncesto Superior Nacional.

== National team career ==
Selden competed for the United States in the 2015 World University Games. He averaged 19.5 points and 6.5 rebounds in leading Team USA to an 8–0 record and an 84–77 victory over Germany in the gold medal game.

== Career statistics ==
Legend
GP	Games played	GS	Games started	MPG	Minutes per game
FG%	Field goal percentage	3P%	3-point field goal percentage	FT%	Free throw percentage
RPG	Rebounds per game	APG	Assists per game	SPG	Steals per game
BPG	Blocks per game	PPG	Points per game	**Bold**	Career high

=== NBA ===
==== Regular season ====
Year	Team	GP	GS	MPG	FG%	3P%	FT%	RPG	APG	SPG	BPG	PPG
2016–17	New Orleans	3	3	15.7	**.625**	**.571**	.500	**1.7**	.3	**.7**	.0	5.3
2016–17	Memphis	11	2	17.2	.400	.143	.667	1.0	1.1	.4	.1	5.0
2017–18	Memphis	35	9	19.8	.431	.402	.746	1.6	**1.9**	.5	.1	**9.3**
2018–19	Memphis	32	0	14.2	.404	.317	**.759**	1.4	1.1	.3	**.2**	5.4
2018–19	Chicago	**43**	**13**	**22.9**	.407	.315	.714	3.2	1.7	.5	**.2**	8.0
2021–22	New York	3	0	6.3	.250	.500	.500	.3	.3	.0	.0	1.7
Career		127	27	18.8	.415	.344	.718	2.0	1.5	.4	.1	7.2

==== Playoffs ====
Year	Team	GP	GS	MPG	FG%	3P%	FT%	RPG	APG	SPG	BPG	PPG
2017	Memphis	6	2	17.7	.346	.182	.750	1.5	1.2	.2	.2	3.8
Career		6	2	17.7	.346	.182	.750	1.5	1.2	.2	.2	3.8

=== College ===
Year	Team	GP	GS	MPG	FG%	3P%	FT%	RPG	APG	SPG	BPG	PPG
2013–14	Kansas	35	35	29.2	.437	.328	.629	2.6	2.5	**.7**	.3	9.7
2014–15	Kansas	36	36	29.4	.382	.365	**.657**	2.8	**2.6**	.6	**.5**	9.4
2015–16	Kansas	**38**	**37**	**29.8**	**.474**	**.392**	.612	**3.4**	**2.6**	**.7**	.3	**13.8**
Career		109	108	29.5	.436	.366	.632	3.0	2.6	.7	.4	11.0

== Personal life ==
Selden is the son of Wayne Selden Sr. and Lavette Pitts, and has a brother and sister, Anthony Selden and Taylor Guarino-Selden.
