= Bruce Kreutzer =

American basketball player and coach (born 1950)

Personal information
- Born: 1950 (age 75–76)

Career information
- College: Rockland Community College(1968–70) New Paltz (1970–1972)
- Position: Point guard

Career history

Coaching
- ?–?: Queens University (assistant)
- ?–?: UNC Charlotte (assistant)
- ?–?: Garinger HS
- ?–2006: Massanutten Military Academy
- 2006–2008: Atlanta Vision
- 2008–2010: Philadelphia 76ers (shooting consultant)
- 2015–2018: Charlotte Hornets (assistant)
- 2018–2022: Orlando Magic (assistant)
- 2022–2024: Charlotte Hornets (assistant)

Career highlights
- As head coach: NCHSAA championship (1989)

Bruce Kreutzer (born 1950) is an American basketball coach and former player, who last worked as an assistant coach for the Charlotte Hornets of the National Basketball Association (NBA).

== Coaching career ==
Kreutzer served as an assistant coach at Queens University – reaching the NCAA Division II Final Four in 2003 – and UNC Charlotte. He also has been head coach at Garinger High School where he won the 4A Boys State High School title in 1989 and then served as head coach at Massanutten Military Academy (Woodstock, Virginia), leading his team to a No. 9 ranking nationally in 2006 and developing more than 20 NCAA Division I college players during his tenure. In total, Kreutzer amassed more than 300 wins at the high school and prep levels.

In 2006, Kreutzer joined former Charlotte Hornets assistant coach and four-time NBA All-Star Mark Price to form the Mark Price Shooting Lab at the Suwanee Sports Academy in Atlanta, where he served as lead shooting instructor and player development coach. Kruetzer's professional experience also includes serving as the head coach of the ABA’s Atlanta Vision (2006–2008), where the team won the Southern Division and made an Elite Eight appearance.

=== NBA ===
Kreutzer also served as a shooting consultant for the NBA D-League (2008–2011) and the Philadelphia 76ers (2008–2010).

On July 2, 2015, Kreutzer signed with the Charlotte Hornets to become an assistant coach.

On June 26, 2018, Kreutzer was hired by the Orlando Magic as an assistant coach.

On August 2, 2022, Kreutzer was rehired by the Charlotte Hornets as an assistant coach.
