= 2016–17 Denver Nuggets season =

NBA professional basketball team season

- Head coach: Michael Malone
- General manager: Tim Connelly
- Owners: Ann Walton Kroenke
- Arena: Pepsi Center

Results
- Record: 40–42 (.488)
- Place: Division: 4th (Northwest); Conference: 9th (Western)
- Playoff finish: Did not qualify
- Stats at Basketball Reference

Local media
- Television: Altitude Sports and Entertainment
- Radio: KKSE

The 2016–17 Denver Nuggets season was the 41st season of the franchise in the National Basketball Association (NBA). Thanks to the continuing improvements of Nikola Jokić, the Nuggets would make significant improvements to their team, although they would be just one game shy from reaching the NBA playoffs that year.

As of the 2025 season, this remains the last season they finished with a losing record.

== Key dates ==
- June 23, 2016: The 2016 NBA draft takes place at the Barclays Center in Brooklyn, New York.
- September 9, 2016: Chuck Hayes retires as a player to become a player development coach and hold a front office role for the team somewhere at an entry-level position.
- October 29, 2016: The Denver Nuggets officially retire Dikembe Mutombo's number.
- February 13, 2017: Denver traded center Jusuf Nurkić and the Memphis Grizzlies' own 2017 first-round pick to the Portland Trail Blazers in exchange for center Mason Plumlee, a 2018 second-round pick, and cash considerations.

== Draft ==
Round	Pick	Player	Position	Nationality	College / Club
1	7	Jamal Murray	SG	Canada	Kentucky
1	15	Juan Hernangómez	SF/PF	Spain	Movistar Estudiantes (Spain)
1	19	Malik Beasley	SG	United States	Florida State
2	53	Petr Cornelie	PF	France	Le Mans Sarthe (France)
2	56	Daniel Hamilton	SG/SF	United States	Connecticut

The Nuggets entered the draft with three first-round selections and two second-round selections, all acquired through previous trades. They had traded their original selections to the New York Knicks (who swapped first-round picks from the 2011 Carmelo Anthony trade and eventually held by the Toronto Raptors as the least favorable pick following the 2016 NBA draft lottery) and the Philadelphia 76ers (a pick eventually used by the New Orleans Pelicans).

== Roster ==
2016–17 Denver Nuggets roster
Players

Pos.	No.	Player	Height	Weight	DOB	From
PF	00	Darrell Arthur	6 ft 9 in (2.06 m)	235 lb (107 kg)	1988-03-25	Kansas
SG	5	Will Barton	6 ft 6 in (1.98 m)	175 lb (79 kg)	1991-01-06	Memphis
SG	25	Malik Beasley (DL)	6 ft 5 in (1.96 m)	196 lb (89 kg)	1996-11-26	Florida State
SF	21	Wilson Chandler	6 ft 8 in (2.03 m)	225 lb (102 kg)	1987-05-10	DePaul
PF	35	Kenneth Faried	6 ft 8 in (2.03 m)	228 lb (103 kg)	1989-11-19	Morehead State
SF	8	Danilo Gallinari	6 ft 10 in (2.08 m)	225 lb (102 kg)	1988-08-08	Italy
SG	14	Gary Harris	6 ft 4 in (1.93 m)	210 lb (95 kg)	1994-09-14	Michigan State
SF	41	Juan Hernangómez	6 ft 9 in (2.06 m)	230 lb (104 kg)	1995-09-28	Spain
C	34	Roy Hibbert	7 ft 2 in (2.18 m)	280 lb (127 kg)	1986-12-11	Georgetown
C	15	Nikola Jokić	7 ft 0 in (2.13 m)	250 lb (113 kg)	1995-02-19	Serbia
SG	3	Mike Miller	6 ft 8 in (2.03 m)	218 lb (99 kg)	1980-02-19	Florida
PG	0	Emmanuel Mudiay	6 ft 5 in (1.96 m)	200 lb (91 kg)	1996-03-05	Prime Prep Academy (TX)
PG	27	Jamal Murray	6 ft 4 in (1.93 m)	207 lb (94 kg)	1997-02-23	Kentucky
PG	1	Jameer Nelson	6 ft 0 in (1.83 m)	190 lb (86 kg)	1982-02-09	Saint Joseph's
C	24	Mason Plumlee	6 ft 11 in (2.11 m)	255 lb (116 kg)	1990-03-05	Duke

Coaches
Head coach
- Michael Malone
Assistant(s)
- Ryan Bowen
- Jordi Fernández
- Chris Finch
- Chuck Hayes
- Micah Nori
- Wes Unseld, Jr.
- John Beckett (player development)
- Stephen Graham (player development)
- Ognjen Stojaković (player development)

Legend
- (DP) Unsigned draft pick
- (FA) Free agent
- (S) Suspended
- (DL) On assignment to D-League affiliate
- Injured

Roster
Updated: 2017-04-04

== Standings ==
=== Division ===
Northwest Division	W	L	PCT	GB	Home	Road	Div	GP
y – Utah Jazz	51	31	.622	–	29‍–‍12	22‍–‍19	8–8	82
x – Oklahoma City Thunder	47	35	.573	4.0	28‍–‍13	19‍–‍22	10–6	82
x – Portland Trail Blazers	41	41	.500	10.0	25‍–‍16	16‍–‍25	11–5	82
e – Denver Nuggets	40	42	.488	11.0	22‍–‍19	18‍–‍23	6–10	82
e – Minnesota Timberwolves	31	51	.378	20.0	20‍–‍21	11‍–‍30	5–11	82

=== Conference ===
Western Conference
#	Team	W	L	PCT	GB	GP
1	z – Golden State Warriors *	67	15	.817	–	82
2	y – San Antonio Spurs *	61	21	.744	6.0	82
3	x – Houston Rockets	55	27	.671	12.0	82
4	x – Los Angeles Clippers	51	31	.622	16.0	82
5	y – Utah Jazz *	51	31	.622	16.0	82
6	x – Oklahoma City Thunder	47	35	.573	20.0	82
7	x – Memphis Grizzlies	43	39	.524	24.0	82
8	x – Portland Trail Blazers	41	41	.500	26.0	82
9	e – Denver Nuggets	40	42	.488	27.0	82
10	e – New Orleans Pelicans	34	48	.415	33.0	82
11	e – Dallas Mavericks	33	49	.402	34.0	82
12	e – Sacramento Kings	32	50	.390	35.0	82
13	e – Minnesota Timberwolves	31	51	.378	36.0	82
14	e – Los Angeles Lakers	26	56	.317	41.0	82
15	e – Phoenix Suns	24	58	.293	43.0	82

== Game log ==
=== Pre-season ===
2016 pre-season game log
Total: 4–4 (Home: 1–1; Road: 3–3)
Pre-season: 4–4 (home: 1–1; road: 3–3)

Game	Date	Team	Score	High points	High rebounds	High assists	Location Attendance	Record
1	October 3	@ Raptors	W 108–106	Jusuf Nurkić (15)	Jusuf Nurkić (10)	Will Barton (5)	Scotiabank Saddledome; 19,600	1–0
2	October 7	@ Lakers	W 101–97	Will Barton (20)	Jusuf Nurkić (14)	Mudiay, Murray (6)	Staples Center; 16,461	2–0
3	October 9	@ Lakers	L 115–124	Jusuf Nurkić (21)	Jusuf Nurkić (16)	Emmanuel Mudiay (7)	Citizens Business Bank Arena; 8,389	2–1
4	October 12	@ Timberwolves	L 88–105	Wilson Chandler (16)	Faried, Toupane (7)	Kennedy, Toupane (3)	Pinnacle Bank Arena; 7,153	2–2
5	October 14	Warriors	L 128–129 (OT)	Danilo Gallinari (19)	Nikola Jokić (10)	Jamal Murray (7)	Pepsi Center; 10,104	2–3
6	October 16	@ Trail Blazers	W 106–97	Wilson Chandler (18)	Jusuf Nurkić (9)	Will Barton (7)	Moda Center; 18,135	3–3
7	October 18	@ Thunder	L 87–97	Danilo Gallinari (18)	Jusuf Nurkić (13)	Will Barton (4)	Chesapeake Energy Arena; N/A	3–4
8	October 21	Mavericks	W 101–75	Danilo Gallinari (16)	Kenneth Faried (9)	Jokić, Nelson (4)	Pepsi Center; 8,453	4–4

2016–17 season schedule

=== Regular season ===
2016–17 game log
Total: 40–42 (Home: 22–19; Road: 18–23)
October: 1–2 (home: 0–1; road: 1–1)

Game	Date	Team	Score	High points	High rebounds	High assists	Location Attendance	Record
1	October 26	@ New Orleans	W 107–102	Jusuf Nurkić (23)	Jusuf Nurkić (9)	Nurkić, Mudiay, Nelson (3)	Smoothie King Center; 15,869	1–0
2	October 29	Portland	L 113–115 (OT)	Nikola Jokić (23)	Nikola Jokić (17)	Emmanuel Mudiay (4)	Pepsi Center; 18,055	1–1
3	October 31	@ Toronto	L 102–105	Mudiay, Barton, Gallinari (16)	Jusuf Nurkić (9)	Emmanuel Mudiay (4)	Air Canada Centre; 19,800	1–2

November: 6–9 (home: 3–5; road: 3–4)

Game	Date	Team	Score	High points	High rebounds	High assists	Location Attendance	Record
4	November 3	@ Minnesota	W 102–99	Wilson Chandler (19)	Jameer Nelson (7)	Jameer Nelson (7)	Target Center; 11,219	2–2
5	November 5	@ Detroit	L 86–103	Wilson Chandler (21)	Jusuf Nurkić (12)	Jameer Nelson (4)	The Palace of Auburn Hills; 16,218	2–3
6	November 6	@ Boston	W 123–107	Emmanuel Mudiay (30)	Kenneth Faried (11)	Jameer Nelson (7)	TD Garden; 17,452	3–3
7	November 8	@ Memphis	L 107–108	Emmanuel Mudiay (23)	Kenneth Faried (11)	Emmanuel Mudiay (7)	FedExForum; 15,109	3–4
8	November 10	Golden State	L 101–125	Jamal Murray (14)	Kenneth Faried (11)	Jamal Murray (6)	Pepsi Center; 17,569	3–5
9	November 12	Detroit	L 95–106	Emmanuel Mudiay (19)	Wilson Chandler (10)	Gary Harris (4)	Pepsi Center; 13,997	3–6
10	November 13	@ Portland	L 105–112	Danilo Gallinari (19)	Kenneth Faried (14)	Nikola Jokić (3)	Moda Center; 19,362	3–7
11	November 16	Phoenix	W 120–104	Wilson Chandler (28)	Kenneth Faried (15)	Emmanuel Mudiay (6)	Pepsi Center; 10,247	4–7
12	November 18	Toronto	L 111–113 (OT)	Emmanuel Mudiay (25)	Nikola Jokić (12)	Emmanuel Mudiay (9)	Pepsi Center; 12,476	4–8
13	November 20	Utah	W 105–91	Wilson Chandler (17)	Jusuf Nurkić (11)	Mudiay, Gallinari (8)	Pepsi Center; 12,565	5–8
14	November 22	Chicago	W 110–107	Jamal Murray (24)	Jusuf Nurkić (14)	Jameer Nelson (7)	Pepsi Center; 14,328	6–8
15	November 23	@ Utah	L 83–108	Jamal Murray (23)	Kenneth Faried (10)	Jusuf Nurkić (6)	Vivint Smart Home Arena; 19,229	6–9
16	November 25	Oklahoma City	L 129–132 (OT)	Jameer Nelson (21)	Wilson Chandler (11)	Jameer Nelson (13)	Pepsi Center; 14,327	6–10
17	November 27	@ Phoenix	W 120–114	Wilson Chandler (25)	Nikola Jokić (11)	Emmanuel Mudiay (6)	Talking Stick Resort Arena; 15,365	7–10
18	November 30	Miami	L 98–106	Nelson, Gallinari, Jokić, Chandler (17)	Nikola Jokić (14)	Jameer Nelson (8)	Pepsi Center; 11,471	7–11

December: 7–8 (home: 4–3; road: 3–5)

Game	Date	Team	Score	High points	High rebounds	High assists	Location Attendance	Record
19	December 2	Houston	L 110–128	Wilson Chandler (24)	Kenneth Faried (10)	Emmanuel Mudiay (6)	Pepsi Center; 15,549	7–12
20	December 3	@ Utah	L 98–105	Barton, Chandler (20)	Kenneth Faried (6)	Jameer Nelson (7)	Vivint Smart Home Arena; 19,911	7–13
21	December 5	@ Philadelphia	W 106–98	Danilo Gallinari (24)	Jusuf Nurkić (10)	Jameer Nelson (4)	Wells Fargo Center; 11,815	8–13
22	December 7	@ Brooklyn	L 111–116	Wilson Chandler (27)	Wilson Chandler (15)	Jameer Nelson (5)	Barclays Center; 14,159	8–14
23	December 8	@ Washington	L 85–92	Nikola Jokić (17)	Nikola Jokić (11)	Jameer Nelson (5)	Verizon Center; 12,645	8–15
24	December 10	@ Orlando	W 121–113	Danilo Gallinari (21)	Kenneth Faried (10)	Nikola Jokić (6)	Amway Center; 17,010	9–15
25	December 12	@ Dallas	L 92–112	Nikola Jokić (27)	Nikola Jokić (11)	Jokić, Mudiay (4)	American Airlines Center; 19,425	9–16
26	December 15	Portland	W 132–120	Danilo Gallinari (27)	Kenneth Faried (9)	Gary Harris (6)	Pepsi Center; 10,022	10–16
27	December 17	New York	W 127–114	Kenneth Faried (25)	Nikola Jokić (9)	Jokić, Mudiay (5)	Pepsi Center; 12,042	11–16
28	December 19	Dallas	W 117–107	Nikola Jokić (27)	Nikola Jokić (15)	Nikola Jokić (9)	Pepsi Center; 12,581	12–16
29	December 20	@ L.A. Clippers	L 102–119	Gary Harris (22)	Kenneth Faried (11)	Jameer Nelson (6)	Staples Center; 19,060	12–17
30	December 23	Atlanta	L 108–109	Danilo Gallinari (21)	Chandler, Gallinari (11)	Nikola Jokić (6)	Pepsi Center; 13,823	12–18
31	December 26	@ L.A. Clippers	W 106–102	Nikola Jokić (24)	Danilo Gallinari (11)	Jameer Nelson (6)	Staples Center; 19,060	13–18
32	December 28	Minnesota	W 105–103	Danilo Gallinari (18)	Nikola Jokić (8)	Nikola Jokić (11)	Pepsi Center; 15,093	14–18
33	December 30	Philadelphia	L 122–124	Nikola Jokić (25)	Wilson Chandler (9)	Nelson, Mudiay (5)	Pepsi Center; 13,619	14–19

January: 7–7 (home: 5–2; road: 2–5)

Game	Date	Team	Score	High points	High rebounds	High assists	Location Attendance	Record
34	January 2	@ Golden State	L 119–127	Jokić, Chandler (21)	Nikola Jokić (13)	Nikola Jokić (5)	Oracle Arena; 19,596	14–20
35	January 3	Sacramento	L 113–120	Danilo Gallinari (24)	Nikola Jokić (7)	Emmanuel Mudiay (6)	Pepsi Center; 11, 018	14–21
36	January 5	San Antonio	L 99–127	Nikola Jokić (19)	Nikola Jokić (11)	Harris, Jokić, Mudiay (5)	Pepsi Center; 14,391	14–22
37	January 7	@ Oklahoma City	L 106–121	Will Barton (21)	Nurkić, Faried (10)	Jameer Nelson (8)	Chesapeake Energy Arena; 18,203	14–23
38	January 12	Indiana	W 140–112	Nikola Jokić (22)	Nikola Jokić (10)	Jokić, Mudiay (7)	The O2 Arena; 16,468	15–23
39	January 16	Orlando	W 125–112	Nikola Jokić (30)	Nikola Jokić (11)	Emmanuel Mudiay (13)	Pepsi Center; 11,217	16–23
40	January 17	@ L.A. Lakers	W 127–121	Nikola Jokić (29)	Nikola Jokić (15)	Will Barton (8)	Staples Center; 18,412	17–23
41	January 19	@ San Antonio	L 104–118	Nikola Jokić (35)	Nikola Jokić (12)	Jameer Nelson (9)	AT&T Center; 18,418	17–24
42	January 21	L.A. Clippers	W 123–98	Nikola Jokić (19)	Nikola Jokić (10)	Jameer Nelson (8)	Pepsi Center; 16,056	18–24
43	January 22	@ Minnesota	L 108–111	Gary Harris (22)	Nikola Jokić (8)	Will Barton (6)	Target Center; 12,788	18–25
44	January 24	Utah	W 103–93	Nikola Jokić (23)	Nikola Jokić (11)	Jameer Nelson (7)	Pepsi Center; 10,867	19–25
45	January 26	Phoenix	W 127–120	Nikola Jokić (29)	Nikola Jokić (14)	Jameer Nelson (9)	Pepsi Center; 12,231	20–25
46	January 28	@ Phoenix	W 123–112	Danilo Gallinari (32)	Kenneth Faried (13)	Jameer Nelson (6)	Talking Stick Resort Arena; 18,055	21–25
47	January 31	@ L.A. Lakers	L 116–120	Wilson Chandler (26)	Kenneth Faried (17)	Jameer Nelson (7)	Staples Center; 18,997	21–26

February: 6–7 (home: 4–3; road: 2–4)

Game	Date	Team	Score	High points	High rebounds	High assists	Location Attendance	Record
48	February 1	Memphis	L 99–119	Arthur, Mudiay, Gallinari (14)	Kenneth Faried (11)	Emmanuel Mudiay (7)	Pepsi Center; 12,020	21–27
49	February 3	Milwaukee	W 121–117	Wilson Chandler (23)	Nikola Jokić (13)	Nikola Jokić (11)	Pepsi Center; 18,792	22–27
50	February 4	@ San Antonio	L 97–121	Jamal Murray (20)	Jusuf Nurkić (8)	Will Barton (5)	AT&T Center; 18,418	22–28
51	February 6	Dallas	W 110–87	Will Barton (31)	Wilson Chandler (10)	Nikola Jokić (9)	Pepsi Center; 13,047	23–28
52	February 8	@ Atlanta	L 106–117	Wilson Chandler (24)	Nikola Jokić (15)	Jameer Nelson (8)	Philips Arena; 14,222	23–29
53	February 10	@ New York	W 131–123	Nikola Jokić (40)	Will Barton (10)	Jameer Nelson (12)	Madison Square Garden; 19,812	24–29
54	February 11	@ Cleveland	L 109–125	Nikola Jokić (27)	Nikola Jokić (13)	Jameer Nelson (8)	Quicken Loans Arena; 20,562	24–30
55	February 13	Golden State	W 132–110	Juan Hernangómez (27)	Nikola Jokić (21)	Nikola Jokić (12)	Pepsi Center; 19,941	25–30
56	February 15	Minnesota	L 99–112	Gary Harris (22)	Nikola Jokić (15)	Jameer Nelson (11)	Pepsi Center; 13,924	25–31
All-Star Break
57	February 23	@ Sacramento	L 100–116	Gary Harris (23)	Nikola Jokić (10)	Jameer Nelson (6)	Golden 1 Center; 17,608	25–32
58	February 24	Brooklyn	W 129–109	Gary Harris (25)	Mason Plumlee (12)	Mason Plumlee (8)	Pepsi Center; 17,143	26–32
59	February 26	Memphis	L 98–105	Danilo Gallinari (24)	Nikola Jokić (11)	Jokić, Chandler (6)	Pepsi Center; 18,024	26–33
60	February 28	@ Chicago	W 125–107	Danilo Gallinari (22)	Nikola Jokić (16)	Nikola Jokić (10)	United Center; 21,015	27–33

March: 8–7 (home: 5–4; road: 3–3)

Game	Date	Team	Score	High points	High rebounds	High assists	Location Attendance	Record
61	March 1	@ Milwaukee	W 110–98	Danilo Gallinari (22)	Nikola Jokić (14)	Nikola Jokić (10)	BMO Harris Bradley Center; 13,214	28–33
62	March 4	Charlotte	L 102–112	Nikola Jokić (31)	Nikola Jokić (14)	Jameer Nelson (5)	Pepsi Center; 14,708	28–34
63	March 6	Sacramento	W 108–96	Wilson Chandler (36)	Chandler, Plumlee (12)	Jameer Nelson (6)	Pepsi Center; 11,614	29–34
64	March 8	Washington	L 113–123	Gary Harris (26)	Mason Plumlee (10)	Jameer Nelson (6)	Pepsi Center; 12,323	29–35
65	March 10	Boston	W 119–99	Wilson Chandler (23)	Nikola Jokić (10)	Nikola Jokić (7)	Pepsi Center; 17,147	30–35
66	March 11	@ Sacramento	W 105–92	Gary Harris (24)	Nikola Jokić (14)	Mason Plumlee (8)	Golden 1 Center; 17,608	31–35
67	March 13	L.A. Lakers	W 129–101	Barton, Murray (22)	Mason Plumlee (10)	Gary Harris (7)	Pepsi Center; 17,344	32–35
68	March 16	L.A. Clippers	W 129–114	Will Barton (35)	Nikola Jokić (14)	Nikola Jokić (11)	Pepsi Center; 14,179	33–35
69	March 18	Houston	L 105–109	Gary Harris (17)	Mason Plumlee (9)	Jameer Nelson (11)	Pepsi Center; 17,512	33–36
70	March 20	@ Houston	L 124–125	Gary Harris (28)	Nikola Jokić (13)	Nikola Jokić (8)	Toyota Center; 16,080	33–37
71	March 22	Cleveland	W 126–113	Gary Harris (21)	Nikola Jokić (10)	Jameer Nelson (9)	Pepsi Center; 19,718	34–37
72	March 24	@ Indiana	W 125–117	Nikola Jokić (30)	Nikola Jokić (17)	Jameer Nelson (6)	Bankers Life Fieldhouse; 17,923	35–37
73	March 26	New Orleans	L 90–115	Mason Plumlee (16)	Nikola Jokić (13)	Jameer Nelson (5)	Pepsi Center; 19,850	35–38
74	March 28	@ Portland	L 113–122	Jameer Nelson (23)	Wilson Chandler (9)	Nikola Jokić (8)	Moda Center; 20,003	35–39
75	March 31	@ Charlotte	L 114–121	Nikola Jokić (26)	Faried, Jokić (13)	Nikola Jokić (10)	Time Warner Cable Arena; 18,353	35–40

April: 5–2 (home: 1–2; road: 4–0)

Game	Date	Team	Score	High points	High rebounds	High assists	Location Attendance	Record
76	April 2	@ Miami	W 116–113	Danilo Gallinari (29)	Nikola Jokić (10)	Emmanuel Mudiay (9)	American Airlines Arena; 19,600	36–40
77	April 4	@ New Orleans	W 134–131	Danilo Gallinari (28)	Nikola Jokić (12)	Emmanuel Mudiay (7)	Smoothie King Center; 16,050	37–40
78	April 5	@ Houston	L 104–110	Danilo Gallinari (23)	Nikola Jokić (19)	Nikola Jokić (9)	Toyota Center; 18,055	37–41
79	April 7	New Orleans	W 122–106	Jamal Murray (30)	Nikola Jokić (12)	Gary Harris (9)	Pepsi Center; 16,348	38–41
80	April 9	Oklahoma City	L 105–106	Danilo Gallinari (34)	Chandler, Gallinari (10)	Harris, Murray (9)	Pepsi Center; 19,718	38–42
81	April 11	@ Dallas	W 109–91	Gary Harris (20)	Mason Plumlee (9)	Jamal Murray (10)	American Airlines Center; 20,333	39–42
82	April 12	@ Oklahoma City	W 111–105	Nikola Jokić (29)	Nikola Jokić (16)	Nikola Jokić (8)	Chesapeake Energy Arena; 18,203	40–42

2016–17 season schedule

== Player statistics ==
Legend
GP	Games played	GS	Games started	MPG	Minutes per game
FG%	Field-goal percentage	3P%	3-point field-goal percentage	FT%	Free-throw percentage
RPG	Rebounds per game	APG	Assists per game	SPG	Steals per game
BPG	Blocks per game	PPG	Points per game

=== Regular season ===
Player	GP	GS	MPG	FG%	3P%	FT%	RPG	APG	SPG	BPG	PPG
Darrell Arthur	41	7	15.6	.442	.453	.864	2.7	1.0	.5	.5	6.4
Will Barton	60	19	28.4	.443	.370	.753	4.3	3.4	.8	.5	13.7
Malik Beasley	22	1	7.5	.452	.321	.800	.8	.5	.3	.00	3.8
Wilson Chandler	71	33	30.9	.461	.337	.727	6.5	2.0	.7	.4	15.7
Kenneth Faried	61	34	21.2	.548	.000	.693	7.6	.9	.7	.7	9.6
Danilo Gallinari	63	63	33.9	.447	.389	.902	5.2	2.1	.6	.2	18.2
Alonzo Gee	13	0	6.8	.214	.000	.556	1.2	.5	.4	.1	.8
Gary Harris	57	56	31.3	.502	.420	.776	3.1	2.9	1.2	.1	14.9
Juancho Hernangómez	62	9	13.6	.451	.407	.750	3.0	.5	.5	.2	4.9
Roy Hibbert^{a}	6	0	1.8	.667	.000	.000	.3	.2	.00	.3	.7
Nikola Jokić	73	59	27.9	.578	.324	.825	9.8	4.9	.8	.8	16.7
Mike Miller	20	0	7.6	.391	.400	1.000	2.0	1.1	.1	.00	1.4
Emmanuel Mudiay	55	41	25.6	.377	.315	.784	3.2	3.9	.7	.2	11.0
Jamal Murray	82	10	21.5	.404	.334	.883	2.6	2.1	.6	.3	9.9
Jameer Nelson	75	39	27.3	.444	.388	.714	2.6	5.1	.7	.1	9.2
Jusuf Nurkić^{a}	45	29	17.9	.507	.000	.496	5.8	1.3	.6	.8	8.0
Johnny O'Bryant^{a}	7	0	6.6	.467	.667	1.000	1.6	.3	.00	.1	2.9
Mason Plumlee^{a}	27	10	23.4	.547	.000	.618	6.4	2.6	.7	1.1	9.1
Jarnell Stokes	2	0	3.5	1.000	.000	.500	1.0	1.0	.5	.00	1.5

^{a} Statistics with the Denver Nuggets

== Transactions ==
=== Trades ===
June 23, 2016	To Denver Nuggets Cash considerations	To Oklahoma City Thunder Rights to 2016 draft pick (United States) Daniel Hamilton
August 30, 2016	To Denver Nuggets Two 2nd–Round Picks in 2017 NBA draft (Note: Denver was to receive the picks if they were between #36–60, otherwise they would receive the picks in 2018.)	To Oklahoma City Thunder (France) Joffrey Lauvergne
January 18, 2017	To Denver Nuggets (United States) Mo Williams Cash Considerations	to Atlanta Hawks Rights to 2005 draft pick (Turkey) Cenk Akyol
February 13, 2017	To Denver Nuggets (United States) Mason Plumlee 2nd-round pick in 2018 NBA draft (Note: Sacramento had the right to swap its pick for Portland's; Denver would receive the lower of the two picks.) Cash Considerations	to Portland Trail Blazers (Bosnia and Herzegovina) Jusuf Nurkić Protected 1st–Round pick in 2017 NBA draft (Note: Portland was to receive the pick from Memphis if it fell between #6–30 in 2017 or 2018, or unconditionally in 2019.)
February 23, 2017	To Denver Nuggets (United States) Roy Hibbert	To Milwaukee Bucks Protected 2nd–round pick in 2019 NBA draft (Note: If Denver's pick were #31–55, Milwaukee was to receive nothing.)

=== Contracts ===
==== Re-signed ====
Player	Signed
Darrell Arthur	Signed 3-year contract worth $23 million
Mike Miller	Signed 2-year contract worth $7 million 2017–18 Non-guaranteed

==== Additions ====
Player	Signed	Former Team
Malik Beasley	Signed a 4–year contract worth $7.8 million Team option in 2018 & 2019	Florida State Seminoles
Jamal Murray	Signed a 4–year contract worth $14.5 million Team option in 2018 & 2019	Kentucky Wildcats
Juan Hernangómez	Signed a 4–year contract worth $9.6 million Team option in 2018 & 2019	(Spain) Movistar Estudiantes
Robbie Hummel	Signed a 2–year contract worth $2.0 million Non-guaranteed training camp invite	(Italy) EA7 Olimpia Milano
D. J. Kennedy	Signed a 1–year contract worth $874 K Non-guaranteed training camp invite	(Russia) Yenisey Krasnoyarsk
Jarnell Stokes	Signed a 2–year contract worth $2.0 million Non-guaranteed training camp invite	(United States) Sioux Falls Skyforce
Nate Wolters	Signed a 3–year contract worth $3.2 million Non-guaranteed training camp invite	(Turkey) Beşiktaş Sompo Japan
Alonzo Gee	Signed a 1–year contract worth $1.1 million	New Orleans Pelicans
Alonzo Gee	Signed 1st 10–day contract worth $77 thousand	Denver Nuggets
Johnny O'Bryant	Signed 1st 10–day contract worth $57 thousand	(United States) Northern Arizona Suns
Johnny O'Bryant	Signed 2nd 10–day contract worth $57 thousand	Denver Nuggets

==== Subtractions ====
Player	Reason Left	New Team
D. J. Augustin	Signed a 4-year contract worth $29 million	Orlando Magic
D. J. Kennedy	Waived	(China) Guangzhou Long-Lions
JaKarr Sampson	Waived	(United States) Iowa Energy
Axel Toupane	Waived	(Canada) Raptors 905
Nate Wolters	Waived	(Serbia) Crvena zvezda
Robbie Hummel	Waived	(Russia) Khimki
Jarnell Stokes	Waived	(United States) Sioux Falls Skyforce
Alonzo Gee	Waived	Denver Nuggets
Mo Williams	Waived	TBA
Alonzo Gee	Contract Expired	TBA
Johnny O'Bryant	Contract Expired	(United States) Northern Arizona Suns
