= 2016–17 Indiana Pacers season =

NBA professional basketball team season

- Head coach: Nate McMillan
- President: Larry Bird
- General manager: Kevin Pritchard
- Owners: Herbert Simon
- Arena: Bankers Life Fieldhouse

Results
- Record: 42–40 (.512)
- Place: Division: 3rd (Central); Conference: 7th (Eastern)
- Playoff finish: First Round (lost to Cavaliers 0–4)
- Stats at Basketball Reference

Local media
- Television: Fox Sports Indiana
- Radio: 1070 The Fan

The 2016–17 Indiana Pacers season was Indiana's 50th season as a franchise and 41st season in the NBA. On May 5, 2016, despite making the playoffs, Pacers' president Larry Bird announced that Frank Vogel's contract would not be renewed, citing a need for "a new voice" to lead the players. On May 16, 2016, the Pacers promoted their assistant head coach Nate McMillan to become their new head coach.

The Pacers would make it to the playoffs, securing the 7th seed. They met the 2nd seeded defending NBA champion Cleveland Cavaliers in the First Round, in which they were swept in four games.

On April 28, 2017, Larry Bird stepped down as the President of the Indiana Pacers.

On June 30, 2017, following the season, Paul George was traded to the Oklahoma City Thunder.

== NBA draft ==
Round	Pick	Player	Position	Nationality	School/club team
1	20	Caris LeVert	SG	United States	Michigan
2	50	Georges Niang	PF	United States	Iowa State

== Roster ==
2016–17 Indiana Pacers roster
Players

Pos.	No.	Player	Height	Weight	DOB	From
F/C	5	Lavoy Allen	6 ft 9 in (2.06 m)	260 lb (118 kg)	1989-02-04	Temple
G	00	Aaron Brooks	6 ft 0 in (1.83 m)	161 lb (73 kg)	1985-01-14	Oregon
F/C	25	Rakeem Christmas	6 ft 9 in (2.06 m)	250 lb (113 kg)	1991-12-01	Syracuse
G	11	Monta Ellis	6 ft 3 in (1.91 m)	185 lb (84 kg)	1985-10-26	Lanier HS (MS)
F	13	Paul George	6 ft 9 in (2.06 m)	220 lb (100 kg)	1990-05-02	Fresno State
C	7	Al Jefferson	6 ft 10 in (2.08 m)	289 lb (131 kg)	1985-01-04	Prentiss HS (MS)
F	0	C. J. Miles	6 ft 6 in (1.98 m)	225 lb (102 kg)	1987-03-18	Skyline HS (TX)
F	32	Georges Niang	6 ft 8 in (2.03 m)	230 lb (104 kg)	1993-06-17	Iowa State
G	40	Glenn Robinson	6 ft 6 in (1.98 m)	222 lb (101 kg)	1994-01-08	Michigan
C	1	Kevin Séraphin	6 ft 10 in (2.08 m)	278 lb (126 kg)	1989-12-07	France
G	6	Lance Stephenson	6 ft 5 in (1.96 m)	230 lb (104 kg)	1990-09-05	Cincinnati
G	44	Jeff Teague	6 ft 2 in (1.88 m)	186 lb (84 kg)	1988-06-10	Wake Forest
C	33	Myles Turner	7 ft 0 in (2.13 m)	255 lb (116 kg)	1996-03-24	Texas
G	3	Joe Young	6 ft 2 in (1.88 m)	180 lb (82 kg)	1992-06-27	Oregon
F	21	Thaddeus Young	6 ft 8 in (2.03 m)	221 lb (100 kg)	1988-06-21	Georgia Tech

Coaches
Head coach
- Nate McMillan
Assistant(s)
- Bill Bayno
- Dan Burke
- Popeye Jones
- David McClure

Legend
- (DP) Unsigned draft pick
- (FA) Free agent
- (S) Suspended
- (DL) On assignment to D-League affiliate
- Injured

Roster
Updated: 2017-04-03

== Standings ==
=== Division ===
Central Division	W	L	PCT	GB	Home	Road	Div	GP
y – Cleveland Cavaliers	51	31	.622	–	31‍–‍10	20‍–‍21	8–8	82
x – Milwaukee Bucks	42	40	.512	9.0	23‍–‍18	19‍–‍22	10–6	82
x – Indiana Pacers	42	40	.512	9.0	29‍–‍12	13‍–‍28	8–8	82
x – Chicago Bulls	41	41	.500	10.0	25‍–‍16	16‍–‍25	9–7	82
Detroit Pistons	37	45	.451	14.0	24‍–‍17	13‍–‍28	5–11	82

=== Conference ===
Eastern Conference
#	Team	W	L	PCT	GB	GP
1	c – Boston Celtics *	53	29	.646	–	82
2	y – Cleveland Cavaliers *	51	31	.622	2.0	82
3	x – Toronto Raptors	51	31	.622	2.0	82
4	y – Washington Wizards *	49	33	.598	4.0	82
5	x – Atlanta Hawks	43	39	.524	10.0	82
6	x – Milwaukee Bucks	42	40	.512	11.0	82
7	x – Indiana Pacers	42	40	.512	11.0	82
8	x – Chicago Bulls	41	41	.500	12.0	82
9	Miami Heat	41	41	.500	12.0	82
10	Detroit Pistons	37	45	.451	16.0	82
11	Charlotte Hornets	36	46	.439	17.0	82
12	New York Knicks	31	51	.378	22.0	82
13	Orlando Magic	29	53	.354	24.0	82
14	Philadelphia 76ers	28	54	.341	25.0	82
15	Brooklyn Nets	20	62	.244	33.0	82

== Game log ==
=== Preseason ===
2016 pre-season game log
Total: 3–3 (home: 3–0; road: 0–3)
Pre-season: 3–3 (home: 3–0; road: 0–3)

Game	Date	Team	Score	High points	High rebounds	High assists	Location Attendance	Record
1	October 4	Pelicans	W 113–96	Al Jefferson (14)	Thaddeus Young (10)	Allen, Teague (4)	Smoothie King Center; 15,369	1–0
2	October 6	Bulls	W 115–108	Rodney Stuckey (20)	Al Jefferson (11)	Rodney Stuckey (7)	Bankers Life Fieldhouse; 12,925	2–0
3	October 8	@ Bulls	L 106–121	Jeff Teague (21)	Glenn Robinson III (6)	Monta Ellis (6)	United Center; 20,096	2–1
4	October 12	Bucks	W 101–83	Rodney Stuckey (21)	Lavoy Allen (11)	Rodney Stuckey (5)	Bankers Life Fieldhouse; 6,447	3–1
5	October 14	@ Magic	L 106–114	Myles Turner (17)	Thaddeus Young (8)	Monta Ellis (6)	Amway Center; 14,097	3–2
6	October 19	@ Bucks	L 103–111	Paul George (18)	Myles Turner (9)	Ellis, Teague (7)	BMO Harris Bradley Center; 5,450	3–3

2016–17 season schedule

=== Regular season ===
2016–17 game log
Total: 42–40 (home: 29–12; road: 13–28)
October: 1–2 (home: 1–0; road: 0–2)

Game	Date	Team	Score	High points	High rebounds	High assists	Location Attendance	Record
1	October 26	Dallas	W 130–121 (OT)	Myles Turner (30)	Myles Turner (16)	Jeff Teague (8)	Bankers Life Fieldhouse; 17,923	1–0
2	October 28	@ Brooklyn	L 94–103	Paul George (22)	Myles Turner (11)	Jeff Teague (7)	Barclays Center; 17,732	1–1
3	October 29	@ Chicago	L 101–118	George, Turner (20)	Thaddeus Young (5)	Jeff Teague (8)	United Center; 21,373	1–2

November : 8–8 (home: 7–4; road: 1–4)

Game	Date	Team	Score	High points	High rebounds	High assists	Location Attendance	Record
4	November 1	L. A. Lakers	W 115–108	Paul George (30)	Paul George (7)	Jeff Teague (6)	Bankers Life Fieldhouse; 17,923	2–2
5	November 3	@ Milwaukee	L 107–125	Paul George (23)	Al Jefferson (7)	Jeff Teague (10)	BMO Harris Bradley Center; 11,374	2–3
6	November 5	Chicago	W 111–94	Jeff Teague (21)	Paul George (7)	Monta Ellis (8)	Bankers Life Fieldhouse; 17,020	3–3
7	November 7	@ Charlotte	L 100–122	C.J. Miles (23)	Al Jefferson (9)	Aaron Brooks (9)	Spectrum Center; 16,880	3–4
8	November 9	Philadelphia	W 122–115 (OT)	Jeff Teague (30)	Myles Turner (9)	Jeff Teague (9)	Bankers Life Fieldhouse; 15,360	4–4
9	November 11	@ Philadelphia	L 105–109 (OT)	Paul George (26)	George, Turner (9)	Monta Ellis (5)	Wells Fargo Center; 17,643	4–5
10	November 12	Boston	L 99–105	Jeff Teague (20)	Young, Turner (8)	Teague, Ellis (4)	Bankers Life Fieldhouse; 17,923	4–6
11	November 14	Orlando	W 88–69	C.J. Miles (16)	Kevin Seraphin (10)	Teague, George (5)	Bankers Life Fieldhouse; 14,825	5–6
12	November 16	Cleveland	W 103–93	Paul George (21)	Paul George (11)	Jeff Teague (8)	Bankers Life Fieldhouse; 17,923	6–6
13	November 18	Phoenix	L 96–116	Myles Turner (22)	Myles Turner (6)	Jeff Teague (7)	Bankers Life Fieldhouse; 16,780	6–7
14	November 20	@ Oklahoma City	W 115–111 (OT)	Jeff Teague (30)	Young, Robinson III (11)	Jeff Teague (9)	Chesapeake Energy Arena; 18,203	7–7
15	November 21	Golden State	L 83–120	Rodney Stuckey (21)	Kevin Seraphin (14)	Teague, Brooks (3)	Bankers Life Fieldhouse; 17,923	7–8
16	November 23	Atlanta	L 85–96	Thaddeus Young (24)	Myles Turner (9)	Jeff Teague (8)	Bankers Life Fieldhouse; 16,032	7–9
17	November 25	Brooklyn	W 118–97	Glenn Robinson III (20)	Jeff Teague (9)	Jeff Teague (8)	Bankers Life Fieldhouse; 16,083	8–9
18	November 27	L. A. Clippers	W 91–70	Turner, Robinson III (17)	Myles Turner (12)	Jeff Teague (10)	Bankers Life Fieldhouse; 15,572	9–9
19	November 30	@ Portland	L 109–131	Jeff Teague (25)	Myles Turner (10)	Jeff Teague (8)	Moda Center; 19,107	9–10

December : 7–8 (home: 4–1; road: 3–7)

Game	Date	Team	Score	High points	High rebounds	High assists	Location Attendance	Record
20	December 4	@ L. A. Clippers	W 111–102	Thaddeus Young (17)	Young, George (7)	Teague, Turner, Stuckey (3)	Staples Center; 19,060	10–10
21	December 5	@ Golden State	L 106–142	Paul George (21)	Paul George (10)	Jeff Teague (6)	Oracle Arena; 19,596	10–11
22	December 7	@ Phoenix	W 109–94	Paul George (25)	Paul George (13)	Jeff Teague (11)	Talking Stick Resort Arena; 17,452	11–11
23	December 9	@ Dallas	L 103–111	Paul George (22)	Paul George (7)	Rodney Stuckey (8)	American Airlines Center; 19,486	11–12
24	December 10	Portland	W 118–111	Paul George (37)	Thaddeus Young (9)	Jeff Teague (6)	Bankers Life Fieldhouse; 16,211	12–12
25	December 12	Charlotte	W 110–94	Turner, George (22)	Myles Turner (7)	Jeff Teague (11)	Bankers Life Fieldhouse; 14,138	13–12
26	December 14	@ Miami	L 89–95	Paul George (22)	Turner, Young, George (7)	Jeff Teague (5)	American Airlines Arena; 19,600	13–13
27	December 15	@ New Orleans	L 95–102	Myles Turner (26)	Thaddeus Young (9)	Jeff Teague (10)	Smoothie King Center; 15,472	13–14
28	December 17	@ Detroit	W 105–90	Paul George (26)	Glenn Robinson III (12)	Jeff Teague (7)	Palace of Auburn Hills; 15,231	14–14
29	December 19	Washington	W 107–105	Paul George (27)	Thaddeus Young (11)	Jeff Teague (10)	Bankers Life Fieldhouse; 17,686	15–14
30	December 20	@ New York	L 111–118	Thaddeus Young (21)	Myles Turner (9)	Jeff Teague (12)	Madison Square Garden; 19,812	15–15
31	December 22	Boston	L 102–109	Jeff Teague (21)	Thaddeus Young (12)	Jeff Teague (8)	Bankers Life Fieldhouse; 17,577	15–16
32	December 26	@ Chicago	L 85–90	Aaron Brooks (19)	Myles Turner (8)	Paul George (8)	United Center; 21,922	15–17
33	December 28	@ Washington	L 105–111	Paul George (34)	Myles Turner (8)	Jeff Teague (11)	Verizon Center; 16,172	15–18
34	December 30	Chicago	W 111–101	Paul George (37)	Glenn Robinson III (10)	Jeff Teague (17)	Bankers Life Fieldhouse; 17,923	16–18

January : 9–4 (home: 6–1; road: 3–3)

Game	Date	Team	Score	High points	High rebounds	High assists	Location Attendance	Record
35	January 1	Orlando	W 117–104	Myles Turner (23)	Myles Turner (12)	Jeff Teague (9)	Bankers Life Fieldhouse; 17,530	17–18
36	January 3	@ Detroit	W 121–116	Paul George (32)	Myles Turner (7)	Jeff Teague (8)	Palace of Auburn Hills; 13,435	18–18
37	January 5	Brooklyn	W 121–109	Paul George (26)	Myles Turner (15)	Jeff Teague (15)	Bankers Life Fieldhouse; 16,421	19–18
38	January 7	New York	W 123–109	Teague, George (19)	Myles Turner (10)	Jeff Teague (8)	Bankers Life Fieldhouse; 17,367	20–18
39	January 12	@ Denver	L 112–140	C.J Miles (20)	Myles Turner (6)	Jeff Teague (9)	The O2 Arena; 20,000	20–19
40	January 16	New Orleans	W 98–95	Paul George (19)	Myles Turner (12)	Jeff Teague (10)	Bankers Life Fieldhouse; 15,545	21–19
41	January 18	@ Sacramento	W 106–100	Paul George (25)	Jeff Teague (7)	Jeff Teague (11)	Golden 1 Center; 17,608	22–19
42	January 20	@ L. A. Lakers	L 95–108	Paul George (21)	George, Jefferson (6)	Jeff Teague (7)	Staples Center; 18,412	22–20
43	January 21	@ Utah	L 100–109	Young, George, Teague (19)	Thaddeus Young (9)	Jeff Teague (7)	Vivint Smart Home Arena; 19,911	22–21
44	January 23	New York	L 103–109	Paul George (31)	Myles Turner (10)	Jeff Teague (7)	Bankers Life Fieldhouse; 16,015	22–22
45	January 26	@ Minnesota	W 109–103	Paul George (32)	Jeff Teague (8)	Jeff Teague (13)	Target Center; 14,862	23–22
46	January 27	Sacramento	W 115–111 (OT)	Paul George (33)	Jeff Teague (8)	Jeff Teague (8)	Bankers Life Fieldhouse; 17,522	24–22
47	January 29	Houston	W 120–101	Paul George (33)	Myles Turner (10)	Jeff Teague (15)	Bankers Life Fieldhouse; 17,923	25–22

February : 6–7 (home: 3–4; road: 3–3)

Game	Date	Team	Score	High points	High rebounds	High assists	Location Attendance	Record
48	February 1	@ Orlando	W 98–88	C.J. Miles (16)	Paul George (7)	Jeff Teague (9)	Amway Center; 16,662	26–22
49	February 3	@ Brooklyn	W 106–97	George, Teague (24)	Paul George (11)	Jeff Teague (7)	Barclays Center; 14,557	27–22
50	February 4	Detroit	W 105–84	Paul George (21)	Lavoy Allen (11)	Jeff Teague (7)	Bankers Life Fieldhouse; 17,660	28–22
51	February 6	Oklahoma City	W 93–90	Paul George (21)	Paul George (8)	George, Ellis (4)	Bankers Life Fieldhouse; 16,123	29–22
52	February 8	Cleveland	L 117–132	C.J. Miles (23)	Paul George (8)	Jeff Teague (14)	Bankers Life Fieldhouse; 17,580	29–23
53	February 10	@ Washington	L 107–112	Paul George (31)	Al Jefferson (8)	Jeff Teague (9)	Verizon Center; 19,503	29–24
54	February 11	Milwaukee	L 100–116	C.J. Miles (23)	Paul George (8)	Teague, Turner (6)	Bankers Life Fieldhouse; 17,923	29–25
55	February 13	San Antonio	L 106–110	Myles Turner (22)	George, Turner (6)	Jeff Teague (5)	Bankers Life Fieldhouse; 15,203	29–26
56	February 15	@ Cleveland	L 104–113	Glenn Robinson III (19)	George, Turner (7)	Jeff Teague (11)	Quicken Loans Arena; 20,562	29–27
57	February 16	Washington	L 98–111	George, Turner (17)	Myles Turner (9)	Monta Ellis (7)	Bankers Life Fieldhouse; 17,233	29–28
58	February 24	Memphis	W 102–92	C.J. Miles (17)	Lavoy Allen (10)	Jeff Teague (10)	Bankers Life Fieldhouse; 17,923	30–28
59	February 25	@ Miami	L 95–113	Myles Turner (18)	Turner, Christmas (7)	Jeff Teague (6)	AmericanAirlines Arena; 19,600	30–29
60	February 27	@ Houston	W 117–108	Jeff Teague (25)	Lavoy Allen (11)	Monta Ellis (8)	Toyota Center; 18,055	31–29

March : 6–10 (home: 5–2; road: 1–8)

Game	Date	Team	Score	High points	High rebounds	High assists	Location Attendance	Record
61	March 1	@ San Antonio	L 99–100	Paul George (22)	George, Turner, Miles (6)	Jeff Teague (9)	AT&T Center; 18,418	31–30
62	March 5	@ Atlanta	W 97–96	Paul George (34)	Al Jefferson (8)	Jeff Teague (6)	Philips Arena; 15,366	32–30
63	March 6	@ Charlotte	L 88–100	Paul George (36)	Paul George (10)	Jeff Teague (8)	Spectrum Center; 16,387	32–31
64	March 8	Detroit	W 115–98	Paul George (22)	George, Turner (8)	Rodney Stuckey (7)	Bankers Life Fieldhouse; 14,353	33–31
65	March 10	@ Milwaukee	L 85–99	Paul George (18)	Paul George (11)	Paul George (6)	Bradley Center; 16,177	33–32
66	March 12	Miami	W 102–98	Paul George (28)	Paul George (10)	Jeff Teague (4)	Bankers Life Fieldhouse; 17,923	34–32
67	March 14	@ New York	L 81–87	Paul George (22)	Myles Turner (12)	Jeff Teague (6)	Madison Square Garden; 18,261	34–33
68	March 15	Charlotte	W 98–77	Paul George (39)	Myles Turner (11)	Jeff Teague (11)	Bankers Life Fieldhouse; 14,169	35–33
69	March 19	@ Toronto	L 91–116	Paul George (18)	Christmas, Turner (5)	Jeff Teague (7)	Air Canada Centre; 19,800	35–34
70	March 20	Utah	W 107–100	Jeff Teague (21)	George, Young (8)	George, Teague (5)	Bankers Life Fieldhouse; 15,458	36–34
71	March 22	@ Boston	L 100–109	Paul George (37)	Myles Turner (9)	Jeff Teague (6)	TD Garden; 18,624	36–35
72	March 24	Denver	L 117–125	Paul George (27)	Paul George (9)	Jeff Teague (8)	Bankers Life Fieldhouse; 17,923	36–36
73	March 26	Philadelphia	W 107–94	Paul George (21)	Myles Turner (16)	Jeff Teague (4)	Bankers Life Fieldhouse; 16,467	37–36
74	March 28	Minnesota	L 114–115	Paul George (37)	Myles Turner (8)	Jeff Teague (10)	Bankers Life Fieldhouse; 17,534	37–37
75	March 29	@ Memphis	L 97–110	Paul George (22)	Thaddeus Young (13)	Jeff Teague (5)	FedExForum; 16,367	37–38
76	March 31	@ Toronto	L 100–111	Paul George (28)	George, Turner (9)	Jeff Teague (5)	Air Canada Centre; 19,800	37–39

April : 5–1 (home: 3–0; road: 2–1)

Game	Date	Team	Score	High points	High rebounds	High assists	Location Attendance	Record
77	April 2	@ Cleveland	L 130–135 (2OT)	Paul George (47)	George, Young (9)	Jeff Teague (11)	Quicken Loans Arena; 20,562	37–40
78	April 4	Toronto	W 108–90	Paul George (35)	Thaddeus Young (11)	Jeff Teague (6)	Bankers Life Fieldhouse; 16,524	38–40
79	April 6	Milwaukee	W 104–89	Paul George (23)	Thaddeus Young (11)	Jeff Teague (7)	Bankers Life Fieldhouse; 17,010	39–40
80	April 8	@ Orlando	W 127–112	Paul George (37)	Myles Turner (8)	Jeff Teague (10)	Amway Center; 18,846	40–40
81	April 10	@ Philadelphia	W 120–111	Paul George (27)	Myles Turner (13)	Jeff Teague (6)	Wells Fargo Center; 14,622	41–40
82	April 12	Atlanta	W 104–86	Paul George (32)	Paul George (11)	Jeff Teague (7)	Bankers Life Fieldhouse; 17,923	42–40

2016–17 season schedule

=== Playoffs ===
2017 playoff game log
Total: 0–4 (home: 0–2; road: 0–2)
First Round: 0–4 (home: 0–2; road: 0–2)

Game	Date	Team	Score	High points	High rebounds	High assists	Location Attendance	Series
1	April 15	@ Cleveland	L 108–109	Paul George (29)	Thaddeus Young (9)	Paul George (7)	Quicken Loans Arena; 20,562	0–1
2	April 17	@ Cleveland	L 111–117	Paul George (32)	Paul George (8)	Paul George (7)	Quicken Loans Arena; 20,562	0–2
3	April 20	Cleveland	L 114–119	Paul George (36)	Paul George (15)	Paul George (6)	Bankers Life Fieldhouse; 17,923	0–3
4	April 23	Cleveland	L 102–106	Lance Stephenson (22)	Thaddeus Young (10)	Jeff Teague (10)	Bankers Life Fieldhouse; 17,923	0–4

2017 playoff schedule

== Player statistics ==
=== Regular season ===
Player	POS	GP	GS	MP	REB	AST	STL	BLK	PTS	MPG	RPG	APG	SPG	BPG	PPG
Jeff Teague	PG	82	82	2,657	330	639	100	32	1,254	32.4	4.0	7.8	1.2	.4	15.3
Myles Turner	C	81	81	2,541	589	106	74	172	1,173	31.4	7.3	1.3	.9	2.1	14.5
C. J. Miles	SF	76	29	1,776	229	48	46	25	815	23.4	3.0	.6	.6	.3	10.7
Paul George	SF	75	75	2,689	492	251	119	27	1,775	35.9	6.6	3.3	1.6	.4	23.7
Thaddeus Young	PF	74	74	2,237	448	122	113	29	814	30.2	6.1	1.6	1.5	.4	11.0
Monta Ellis	SG	74	33	1,998	204	236	78	27	630	27.0	2.8	3.2	1.1	.4	8.5
Glenn Robinson III	SF	69	27	1,427	246	47	41	20	419	20.7	3.6	.7	.6	.3	6.1
Al Jefferson	C	66	1	931	278	57	19	16	535	14.1	4.2	.9	.3	.2	8.1
Aaron Brooks	PG	65	0	894	69	125	25	9	322	13.8	1.1	1.9	.4	.1	5.0
Lavoy Allen	PF	61	5	871	219	57	18	24	177	14.3	3.6	.9	.3	.4	2.9
Kevin Séraphin	PF	49	3	559	142	23	7	20	232	11.4	2.9	.5	.1	.4	4.7
Rodney Stuckey	PG	39	0	696	84	84	16	0	281	17.8	2.2	2.2	.4	.0	7.2
Joe Young	PG	33	0	135	17	15	4	0	68	4.1	.5	.5	.1	.0	2.1
Rakeem Christmas	PF	29	0	219	56	4	3	6	59	7.6	1.9	.1	.1	.2	2.0
Georges Niang	PF	23	0	93	17	5	3	0	21	4.0	.7	.2	.1	.0	.9
Lance Stephenson^{†}	SG	6	0	132	24	25	3	2	43	22.0	4.0	4.2	.5	.3	7.2

- ^{†} Denotes player spent time with another team in the season. Stats reflect time with the Pacers only.

=== Playoffs ===
Player	POS	GP	GS	MP	REB	AST	STL	BLK	PTS	MPG	RPG	APG	SPG	BPG	PPG
Paul George	SF	4	4	172	35	29	7	2	112	43.0	8.8	7.3	1.8	.5	28.0
Jeff Teague	PG	4	4	142	13	25	4	3	68	35.5	3.3	6.3	1.0	.8	17.0
Thaddeus Young	PF	4	4	140	36	10	8	1	48	35.0	9.0	2.5	2.0	.3	12.0
Myles Turner	C	4	4	133	27	3	7	5	43	33.3	6.8	.8	1.8	1.3	10.8
C. J. Miles	SF	4	2	82	8	1	2	1	29	20.5	2.0	.3	.5	.3	7.3
Monta Ellis	SG	4	2	76	8	5	2	1	22	19.0	2.0	1.3	.5	.3	5.5
Lance Stephenson	SG	4	0	107	21	11	2	0	64	26.8	5.3	2.8	.5	.0	16.0
Kevin Séraphin	PF	4	0	59	14	4	0	2	29	14.8	3.5	1.0	.0	.5	7.3
Glenn Robinson III	SF	3	0	31	3	1	0	0	15	10.3	1.0	.3	.0	.0	5.0
Lavoy Allen	PF	3	0	11	2	0	0	0	0	3.7	.7	.0	.0	.0	.0
Aaron Brooks	PG	1	0	7	1	1	0	0	5	7.0	1.0	1.0	.0	.0	5.0

== Transactions ==
=== Trades ===
July 7, 2016	To Indiana Pacers Thaddeus Young		To Brooklyn Nets Draft rights to Caris LeVert (No. 20); 2021 IND second-round pick (Kessler Edwards)
July 7, 2016	To Indiana Pacers Jeff Teague (from Atlanta)	To Utah Jazz George Hill (from Indiana)	To Atlanta Hawks Draft rights to Taurean Prince (No. 12) (from Utah)
July 7, 2016	To Indiana Pacers Jeremy Evans; Draft rights to Emir Preldžić; Cash considerations		To Dallas Mavericks Draft rights to Stanko Barać

=== Free agents ===
==== Additions ====
Player	Signed	Former Team
Al Jefferson	July 9, 2016	Charlotte Hornets
Aaron Brooks	July 21, 2016	Chicago Bulls
Julyan Stone	August 26, 2016	Royal Halı Gaziantep (Turkey)
Alex Poythress	August 29, 2016	Undrafted
Nick Zeisloft	September 6, 2016	Undrafted
Kevin Séraphin	September 8, 2016	New York Knicks
Lance Stephenson	March 30, 2017	Minnesota Timberwolves

==== Subtractions ====
Player	Signed	New Team
Ian Mahinmi	July 7, 2016	Washington Wizards
Jordan Hill	July 19, 2016	Minnesota Timberwolves
Solomon Hill	July 21, 2016	New Orleans Pelicans
Ty Lawson	August 26, 2016	Sacramento Kings
Alex Poythress	October 17, 2016	(Signed a training camp deal)
Nick Zeisloft	October 17, 2016	(Signed a training camp deal)
