= 2016–17 Houston Rockets season =

NBA professional basketball team season

- Head coach: Mike D'Antoni
- General manager: Daryl Morey
- Owners: Leslie Alexander
- Arena: Toyota Center

Results
- Record: 55–27 (.671)
- Place: Division: 2nd (Southwest); Conference: 3rd (Western)
- Playoff finish: Conference Semifinals (lost to Spurs 2–4)
- Stats at Basketball Reference

Local media
- Television: Root Sports Southwest
- Radio: Sportstalk 790

The 2016–17 Houston Rockets season was the 50th season of the franchise in the National Basketball Association (NBA), and their 46th in the Houston area. On June 1, 2016, the Rockets named Mike D'Antoni as their new head coach. They retired the number 11 of former center Yao Ming in February 2017.

The Rockets finished the regular season with a 55–27 record, securing the 3rd seed. In the playoffs, they defeated the Oklahoma City Thunder in five games in the first round, advancing to the conference semifinals, in which they lost in six games to the San Antonio Spurs.

== Draft picks ==
Round	Pick	Player	Position	Nationality	College / club
2	37	Chinanu Onuaku	PF/C	United States	Louisville
2	43	Zhou Qi	C	China	Xinjiang Flying Tigers (China)

== Roster ==
2016–17 Houston Rockets roster
Players

Pos.	No.	Player	Height	Weight	DOB	From
PF	3	Ryan Anderson	6 ft 10 in (2.08 m)	240 lb (109 kg)	1988-05-06	California
SF	1	Trevor Ariza	6 ft 8 in (2.03 m)	215 lb (98 kg)	1985-06-30	UCLA
PG	2	Patrick Beverley	6 ft 1 in (1.85 m)	185 lb (84 kg)	1988-07-12	Arkansas
PG	8	Bobby Brown	6 ft 2 in (1.88 m)	175 lb (79 kg)	1984-09-24	Cal State Fullerton
C	15	Clint Capela	6 ft 10 in (2.08 m)	240 lb (109 kg)	1994-05-18	INSEP (FRA)
SF	7	Sam Dekker	6 ft 9 in (2.06 m)	230 lb (104 kg)	1994-05-06	Wisconsin
SG	10	Eric Gordon	6 ft 4 in (1.93 m)	215 lb (98 kg)	1988-12-25	Indiana
SG	13	James Harden	6 ft 5 in (1.96 m)	220 lb (100 kg)	1989-08-26	Arizona State
PF	5	Montrezl Harrell	6 ft 8 in (2.03 m)	240 lb (109 kg)	1994-01-26	Louisville
C	42	Nenê	6 ft 11 in (2.11 m)	250 lb (113 kg)	1982-09-13	Brazil
PF	21	Chinanu Onuaku	6 ft 10 in (2.08 m)	245 lb (111 kg)	1996-11-01	Louisville
PG	17	Isaiah Taylor	6 ft 3 in (1.91 m)	170 lb (77 kg)	1994-07-11	Texas
SG	12	Lou Williams	6 ft 1 in (1.85 m)	175 lb (79 kg)	1986-10-27	South Gwinnett HS (GA)
SF	14	Troy Williams	6 ft 7 in (2.01 m)	210 lb (95 kg)	1994-12-30	Indiana
PF	30	Kyle Wiltjer	6 ft 10 in (2.08 m)	240 lb (109 kg)	1992-10-20	Gonzaga

Coaches
Head coach
- Mike D'Antoni
Assistant(s)
- Jeff Bzdelik
- Brett Gunning
- Josh Oppenheimer
- Roy Rogers
- John Lucas (player development)

Legend
- (DP) Unsigned draft pick
- (FA) Free agent
- (S) Suspended
- (DL) On assignment to D-League affiliate
- Injured

Roster

== Standings ==
=== Division ===
Southwest Division	W	L	PCT	GB	Home	Road	Div	GP
y – San Antonio Spurs	61	21	.744	–	31‍–‍10	30‍–‍11	11–5	82
x – Houston Rockets	55	27	.671	6.0	30‍–‍11	25‍–‍16	10–6	82
x – Memphis Grizzlies	43	39	.524	18.0	24‍–‍17	19‍–‍22	8–8	82
e – New Orleans Pelicans	34	48	.415	27.0	21‍–‍20	13‍–‍28	6–10	82
e – Dallas Mavericks	33	49	.402	28.0	21‍–‍20	12‍–‍29	5–11	82

=== Conference ===
Western Conference
#	Team	W	L	PCT	GB	GP
1	z – Golden State Warriors *	67	15	.817	–	82
2	y – San Antonio Spurs *	61	21	.744	6.0	82
3	x – Houston Rockets	55	27	.671	12.0	82
4	x – Los Angeles Clippers	51	31	.622	16.0	82
5	y – Utah Jazz *	51	31	.622	16.0	82
6	x – Oklahoma City Thunder	47	35	.573	20.0	82
7	x – Memphis Grizzlies	43	39	.524	24.0	82
8	x – Portland Trail Blazers	41	41	.500	26.0	82
9	e – Denver Nuggets	40	42	.488	27.0	82
10	e – New Orleans Pelicans	34	48	.415	33.0	82
11	e – Dallas Mavericks	33	49	.402	34.0	82
12	e – Sacramento Kings	32	50	.390	35.0	82
13	e – Minnesota Timberwolves	31	51	.378	36.0	82
14	e – Los Angeles Lakers	26	56	.317	41.0	82
15	e – Phoenix Suns	24	58	.293	43.0	82

== Game log ==
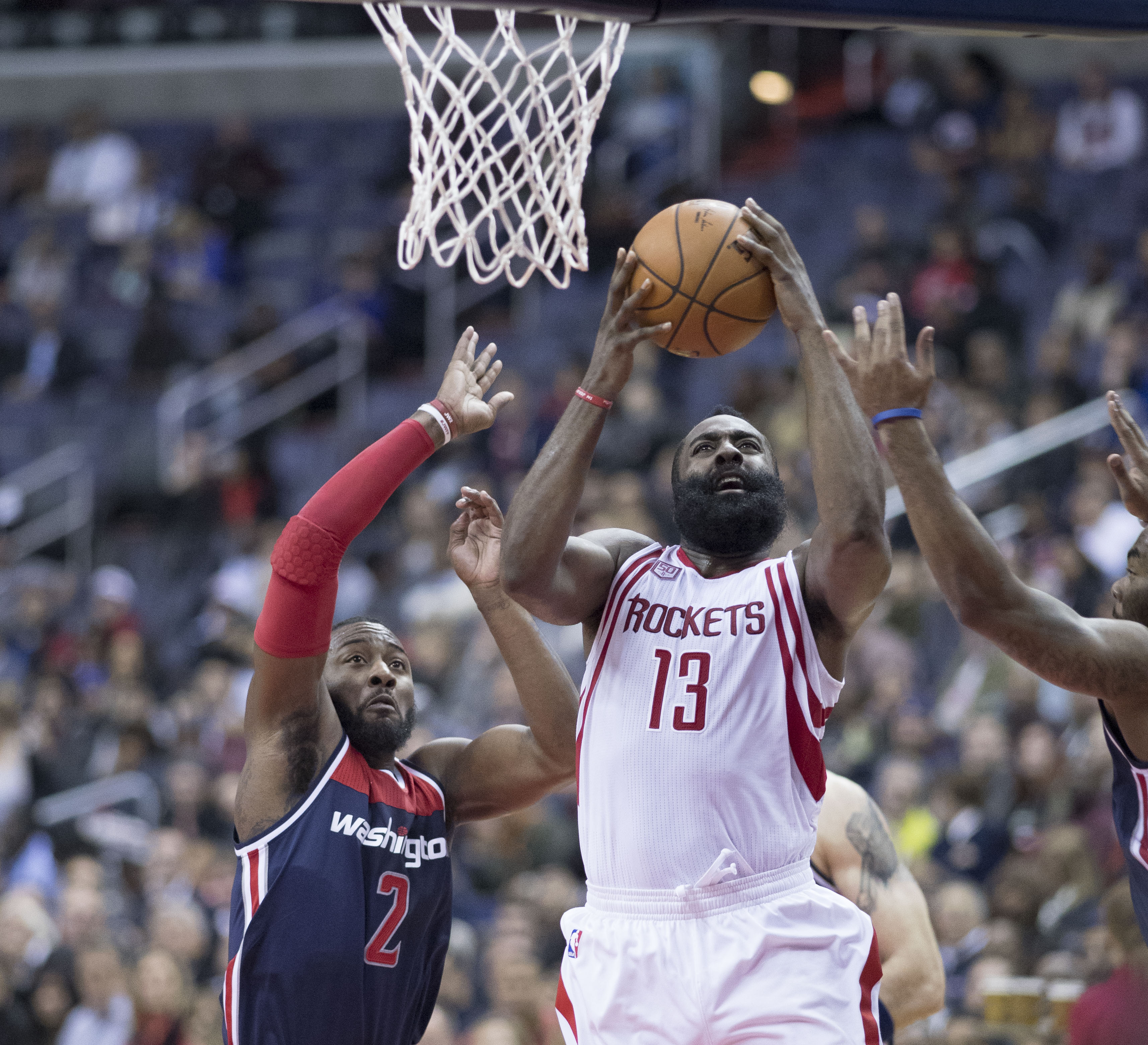
James Harden (Rockets at Wizards, November 7, 2016)

=== Preseason ===
2016 pre-season game log
Total: 5–2 (home: 3–1; road: 2–1)
Pre-season: 5–2 (home: 3–1; road: 2–1)

Game	Date	Team	Score	High points	High rebounds	High assists	Location Attendance	Record
1	October 2	Shanghai Sharks	W 131–94	James Harden (16)	Clint Capela (11)	James Harden (10)	Toyota Center; 12,313	1–0
2	October 4	New York	W 130–103	James Harden (28)	Anderson, Ariza (7)	James Harden (11)	Toyota Center; 14,397	2–0
3	October 9	New Orleans	W 123–117	James Harden (26)	K. J. McDaniels (8)	James Harden (15)	Mercedes-Benz Arena (Shanghai); 15,844	3–0
4	October 12	@ New Orleans	W 116–104	Bobby Brown (18)	Ryan Anderson (7)	James Harden (8)	LeSports Center (Beijing); 14,498	4–0
5	October 15	Memphis	L 125–134 (2OT)	Montrezl Harrell (20)	Harden, Harrell (10)	James Harden (9)	Toyota Center; 14,690	4–1
6	October 19	@ Dallas	W 106–91	James Harden (23)	Clint Capela (13)	James Harden (11)	American Airlines Center; 18,988	5–1
7	October 21	@ San Antonio	L 99–114	Bobby Brown (23)	Montrezl Harrell (8)	Bobby Brown (9)	AT&T Center; 18,418	5–2

2016–17 season schedule

=== Regular season ===
2016–17 game log
Total: 55–27 (home: 30–11; road: 25–16)
October: 2–1 (home: 1–0; road: 1–1)

Game	Date	Team	Score	High points	High rebounds	High assists	Location Attendance	Record
1	October 26	@ L.A. Lakers	L 114–120	James Harden (34)	Clint Capela (9)	James Harden (17)	Staples Center; 18,997	0–1
2	October 28	@ Dallas	W 106–98	Trevor Ariza (27)	Clint Capela (9)	James Harden (8)	American Airlines Center; 20,163	1–1
3	October 30	Dallas	W 93–92	James Harden (28)	Ryan Anderson (12)	James Harden (7)	Toyota Center; 18,055	2–1

November: 9–6 (home: 3–2; road: 6–4)

Game	Date	Team	Score	High points	High rebounds	High assists	Location Attendance	Record
4	November 1	@ Cleveland	L 120–128	James Harden (41)	James Harden (7)	James Harden (15)	Quicken Loans Arena; 20,562	2–2
5	November 2	@ New York	W 118–99	James Harden (30)	Montrezl Harrell (10)	James Harden (15)	Madison Square Garden; 19,812	3–2
6	November 5	@ Atlanta	L 97–112	James Harden (30)	Clint Capela (10)	James Harden (12)	Philips Arena; 16,895	3–3
7	November 7	@ Washington	W 114–106	James Harden (32)	Ryan Anderson (7)	James Harden (15)	Verizon Center; 13,173	4–3
8	November 9	@ San Antonio	W 101–99	James Harden (24)	James Harden (12)	James Harden (15)	AT&T Center; 18,418	5–3
9	November 12	San Antonio	L 100–106	Eric Gordon (27)	James Harden (11)	James Harden (13)	Toyota Center; 18,055	5–4
10	November 14	Philadelphia	W 115–88	James Harden (33)	Clint Capela (13)	James Harden (9)	Toyota Center; 13,183	6–4
11	November 16	@ Oklahoma City	L 103–105	Ryan Anderson (14)	Clint Capela (14)	James Harden (13)	Chesapeake Energy Arena; 18,203	6–5
12	November 17	Portland	W 126–109	James Harden (26)	James Harden (12)	James Harden (14)	Toyota Center; 15,550	7–5
13	November 19	Utah	W 111–102	James Harden (31)	Clint Capela (8)	James Harden (10)	Toyota Center; 14,760	8–5
14	November 21	@ Detroit	W 99–96	James Harden (28)	Clint Capela (12)	James Harden (11)	The Palace of Auburn Hills; 13,632	9–5
15	November 23	Toronto	L 102–115	James Harden (29)	Patrick Beverley (10)	James Harden (15)	Toyota Center; 18,055	9–6
16	November 25	@ Sacramento	W 117–104	James Harden (23)	Capela, Harden (10)	James Harden (10)	Golden 1 Center; 17,608	10–6
17	November 27	@ Portland	W 130–114	James Harden (38)	Clint Capela (9)	James Harden (10)	Moda Center; 19,393	11–6
18	November 29	@ Utah	L 101–120	James Harden (26)	Beverley, Capela, Dekker (6)	James Harden (7)	Vivint Smart Home Arena; 19,911	11–7

December: 15–2 (home: 9–1; road: 6–1)

Game	Date	Team	Score	High points	High rebounds	High assists	Location Attendance	Record
19	December 1	@ Golden State	W 132–127 (2OT)	Anderson, Harden (29)	James Harden (15)	James Harden (13)	Oracle Arena; 19,596	12–7
20	December 2	@ Denver	W 128–110	James Harden (20)	Clint Capela (10)	James Harden (7)	Pepsi Center; 15,549	13–7
21	December 5	Boston	W 107–106	James Harden (37)	Clint Capela (9)	James Harden (8)	Toyota Center; 15,730	14–7
22	December 7	L.A. Lakers	W 134–95	Eric Gordon (26)	Clint Capela (9)	Patrick Beverley (12)	Toyota Center; 16,141	15–7
23	December 9	@ Oklahoma City	W 102–99	James Harden (21)	Patrick Beverley (12)	James Harden (12)	Chesapeake Energy Arena; 18,203	16–7
24	December 10	Dallas	W 109–87	Gordon, Harden (18)	Clint Capela (10)	James Harden (16)	Toyota Center; 15,761	17–7
25	December 12	Brooklyn	W 122–118	James Harden (36)	James Harden (8)	James Harden (11)	Toyota Center; 13,619	18–7
26	December 14	Sacramento	W 132–98	Ryan Anderson (22)	James Harden (11)	James Harden (14)	Toyota Center; 15,039	19–7
27	December 16	New Orleans	W 122–100	Gordon, Harden (29)	Beverley, Capela, Harden (11)	James Harden (13)	Toyota Center; 16,728	20–7
28	December 17	@ Minnesota	W 111–109 (OT)	Anderson, Harden (28)	Patrick Beverley (10)	James Harden (13)	Target Center; 14,689	21–7
29	December 20	San Antonio	L 100–102	James Harden (31)	James Harden (10)	James Harden (7)	Toyota Center; 18,055	21–8
30	December 21	@ Phoenix	W 125–111	James Harden (27)	Patrick Beverley (9)	James Harden (14)	Talking Stick Resort Arena; 18,055	22–8
31	December 23	@ Memphis	L 109–115	Ryan Anderson (31)	Montrezl Harrell (8)	James Harden (17)	FedExForum; 17,454	22–9
32	December 26	Phoenix	W 131–115	James Harden (32)	Trevor Ariza (10)	James Harden (12)	Toyota Center; 18,055	23–9
33	December 27	@ Dallas	W 123–107	James Harden (34)	Sam Dekker (11)	James Harden (11)	American Airlines Center; 20,425	24–9
34	December 30	L.A. Clippers	W 140–116	James Harden (30)	James Harden (13)	James Harden (10)	Toyota Center; 18,055	25–9
35	December 31	New York	W 129–122	James Harden (53)	James Harden (16)	James Harden (17)	Toyota Center; 18,055	26–9

January: 10–7 (home: 5–2; road: 5–5)

Game	Date	Team	Score	High points	High rebounds	High assists	Location Attendance	Record
36	January 2	Washington	W 101–91	Eric Gordon (31)	James Harden (10)	James Harden (10)	Toyota Center; 16,569	27–9
37	January 5	Oklahoma City	W 118–116	James Harden (26)	Beverley, Harden, Harrell (8)	James Harden (12)	Toyota Center; 18,055	28–9
38	January 6	@ Orlando	W 100–93	Ryan Anderson (19)	Patrick Beverley (9)	James Harden (10)	Amway Center; 19,272	29–9
39	January 8	@ Toronto	W 129–122	James Harden (40)	James Harden (10)	James Harden (11)	Air Canada Centre; 19,800	30–9
40	January 10	Charlotte	W 121–114	James Harden (40)	James Harden (15)	James Harden (10)	Toyota Center; 16,196	31–9
41	January 11	@ Minnesota	L 105–119	James Harden (33)	Ryan Anderson (7)	James Harden (12)	Target Center; 13,858	31–10
42	January 13	Memphis	L 105–110	James Harden (27)	Trevor Ariza (9)	James Harden (9)	Toyota Center; 18,055	31–11
43	January 15	@ Brooklyn	W 137–112	Eric Gordon (24)	James Harden (11)	James Harden (11)	Barclays Center; 17,732	32–11
44	January 17	@ Miami	L 103–109	James Harden (40)	James Harden (12)	James Harden (10)	American Airlines Arena; 19,600	32–12
45	January 18	Milwaukee	W 111–92	James Harden (38)	Patrick Beverley (9)	James Harden (8)	Toyota Center; 15,782	33–12
46	January 20	Golden State	L 108–125	Clint Capela (22)	Clint Capela (12)	James Harden (11)	Toyota Center; 18,055	33–13
47	January 21	@ Memphis	W 119–95	Sam Dekker (30)	Trevor Ariza (10)	James Harden (10)	FedExForum; 18,119	34–13
48	January 23	@ Milwaukee	L 114–127	James Harden (26)	James Harden (9)	James Harden (12)	Bradley Center; 14,016	34–14
49	January 25	@ Boston	L 109–120	James Harden (30)	Clint Capela (7)	James Harden (12)	TD Garden; 18,624	34–15
50	January 27	@ Philadelphia	W 123–118	James Harden (51)	James Harden (13)	James Harden (13)	Wells Fargo Center; 20,588	35–15
51	January 29	@ Indiana	L 101–120	Ryan Anderson (27)	Trevor Ariza (9)	James Harden (8)	Bankers Life Fieldhouse; 17,923	35–16
52	January 31	Sacramento	W 105–83	Ryan Anderson (25)	Anderson, Capela (11)	James Harden (8)	Toyota Center; 15,187	36–16

February : 6–3 (home: 4–3; road: 2–0)

Game	Date	Team	Score	High points	High rebounds	High assists	Location Attendance	Record
53	February 2	Atlanta	L 108–113	James Harden (41)	Clint Capela (9)	James Harden (8)	Toyota Center; 15,602	36–17
54	February 3	Chicago	W 121–117 (OT)	James Harden (42)	James Harden (12)	James Harden (9)	Toyota Center; 18,055	37–17
55	February 7	Orlando	W 128–104	James Harden (25)	Clint Capela (9)	James Harden (13)	Toyota Center; 15,514	38–17
56	February 9	@ Charlotte	W 107–95	James Harden (30)	James Harden (11)	James Harden (8)	Spectrum Center; 16,270	39–17
57	February 11	Phoenix	W 133–102	James Harden (40)	Patrick Beverley (10)	James Harden (8)	Toyota Center; 18,055	40–17
58	February 15	Miami	L 109–117	James Harden (38)	James Harden (12)	James Harden (12)	Toyota Center; 16,967	40–18
All-Star Break
59	February 23	@ New Orleans	W 129–99	Lou Williams (27)	Patrick Beverley (12)	James Harden (14)	Smoothie King Center; 18,470	41–18
60	February 25	Minnesota	W 142–130	James Harden (24)	Clint Capela (9)	James Harden (10)	Toyota Center; 18,055	42–18
61	February 27	Indiana	L 108–117	Lou Williams (28)	Capela, Harden (7)	James Harden (12)	Toyota Center; 18,055	42–19

March : 9–6 (home: 6–2; road: 3–4)

Game	Date	Team	Score	High points	High rebounds	High assists	Location Attendance	Record
62	March 1	@ L.A. Clippers	W 122–103	James Harden (26)	Beverley, Capela (12)	James Harden (9)	Staples Center; 19,060	43–19
63	March 4	Memphis	W 123–108	James Harden (33)	Clint Capela (11)	James Harden (11)	Toyota Center; 18,055	44–19
64	March 6	@ San Antonio	L 110–112	James Harden (39)	Patrick Beverley (10)	James Harden (12)	AT&T Center; 18,418	44–20
65	March 8	Utah	L 108–115	James Harden (35)	Clint Capela (12)	James Harden (6)	Toyota Center; 16,230	44–21
66	March 10	@ Chicago	W 115–94	Ryan Anderson (21)	Trevor Ariza (11)	James Harden (13)	United Center; 21,995	45–21
67	March 12	Cleveland	W 117–112	James Harden (38)	Clint Capela (11)	James Harden (11)	Toyota Center; 18,055	46–21
68	March 15	L.A. Lakers	W 139–100	Lou Williams (30)	James Harden (12)	James Harden (13)	Toyota Center; 18,055	47–21
69	March 17	@ New Orleans	L 112–128	James Harden (41)	James Harden (14)	James Harden (11)	Smoothie King Center; 17,972	47–22
70	March 18	@ Denver	W 109–105	James Harden (40)	James Harden (10)	James Harden (10)	Pepsi Center; 17,512	48–22
71	March 20	Denver	W 125–124	James Harden (39)	Clint Capela (9)	James Harden (11)	Toyota Center; 16,080	49–22
72	March 24	New Orleans	W 117–107	James Harden (37)	Clint Capela (13)	James Harden (17)	Toyota Center; 18,055	50–22
73	March 26	Oklahoma City	W 137–125	Lou Williams (31)	Clint Capela (9)	James Harden (12)	Toyota Center; 18,055	51–22
74	March 28	Golden State	L 106–113	James Harden (24)	James Harden (11)	James Harden (13)	Toyota Center; 18,055	51–23
75	March 30	@ Portland	L 107–117	James Harden (30)	Harden, Beverley (8)	Harden, Nene (4)	Moda Center; 20,049	51–24
76	March 31	@ Golden State	L 98–107	James Harden (17)	Clint Capela (14)	James Harden (8)	Oracle Arena; 19,596	51–25

April: 4–2 (home: 2–1; road: 2–1)

Game	Date	Team	Score	High points	High rebounds	High assists	Location Attendance	Record
77	April 2	@ Phoenix	W 123–116	Patrick Beverley (26)	Clint Capela (12)	Patrick Beverley (9)	Talking Stick Resort Arena; 17,378	52–25
78	April 5	Denver	W 110–104	James Harden (31)	Beverley, Capela (11)	James Harden (10)	Toyota Center; 18,055	53–25
79	April 7	Detroit	L 109–114	James Harden (33)	Patrick Beverley (13)	James Harden (12)	Toyota Center; 18,055	53–26
80	April 9	@ Sacramento	W 135–128	James Harden (35)	James Harden (11)	James Harden (15)	Golden 1 Center; 17,608	54–26
81	April 10	@ L.A. Clippers	L 96–125	Eric Gordon (17)	Montrezl Harrell (13)	Bobby Brown (9)	Staples Center; 19,060	54–27
82	April 12	Minnesota	W 123–118	James Harden (27)	Beverley, Capela, Harden (10)	James Harden (12)	Toyota Center; 18,055	55–27

2016–17 season schedule

=== Playoffs ===
2017 playoff game log
Total: 6–5 (home: 4–2; road: 2–3)
First Round: 4–1 (home: 3–0; road: 1–1)

Game	Date	Team	Score	High points	High rebounds	High assists	Location Attendance	Series
1	April 16	Oklahoma City	W 118–87	James Harden (37)	Ryan Anderson (12)	James Harden (9)	Toyota Center; 18,055	1–0
2	April 19	Oklahoma City	W 115–111	James Harden (35)	Clint Capela (10)	James Harden (8)	Toyota Center; 18,055	2–0
3	April 21	@ Oklahoma City	L 113–115	James Harden (44)	Patrick Beverley (7)	James Harden (6)	Chesapeake Energy Arena; 18,203	2–1
4	April 23	@ Oklahoma City	W 113–109	Nenê (28)	Nenê (10)	James Harden (8)	Chesapeake Energy Arena; 18,203	3–1
5	April 25	Oklahoma City	W 105–99	James Harden (34)	Clint Capela (9)	James Harden (4)	Toyota Center; 18,055	4–1

Conference Semifinals: 2–4 (home: 1–2; road: 1–2)

Game	Date	Team	Score	High points	High rebounds	High assists	Location Attendance	Series
1	May 1	@ San Antonio	W 126–99	Trevor Ariza (23)	Clint Capela (13)	James Harden (13)	AT&T Center; 18,418	1–0
2	May 3	@ San Antonio	L 96–121	Ryan Anderson (18)	Ryan Anderson (8)	James Harden (10)	AT&T Center; 18,418	1–1
3	May 5	San Antonio	L 92–103	James Harden (43)	Clint Capela (16)	Ariza, Harden (5)	Toyota Center; 18,187	1–2
4	May 7	San Antonio	W 125–104	James Harden (28)	Clint Capela (9)	James Harden (12)	Toyota Center; 18,055	2–2
5	May 9	@ San Antonio	L 107–110 (OT)	James Harden (33)	Capela, Harden (11)	James Harden (10)	AT&T Center; 18,418	2–3
6	May 11	San Antonio	L 75–114	Trevor Ariza (20)	Clint Capela (12)	James Harden (7)	Toyota Center; 18,055	2–4

2017 playoff schedule

== Player statistics ==
Legend
GP	Games played	GS	Games started	MPG	Minutes per game
FG%	Field-goal percentage	3P%	3-point field-goal percentage	FT%	Free-throw percentage
RPG	Rebounds per game	APG	Assists per game	SPG	Steals per game
BPG	Blocks per game	PPG	Points per game

=== Regular season ===
Houston Rockets statistics
Player	GP	GS	MPG	FG%	3P%	FT%	RPG	APG	SPG	BPG	PPG
Ryan Anderson	72	72	29.4	.418	.403	.860	4.6	.9	.4	.2	13.6
Trevor Ariza	80	80	34.7	.409	.344	.738	5.7	2.2	1.8	.3	11.7
Patrick Beverley	67	67	30.7	.420	.382	.768	5.9	4.2	1.5	.4	9.5
Corey Brewer‡	58	8	15.9	.414	.234	.727	2.0	1.1	.6	.2	4.2
Bobby Brown	25	0	4.9	.383	.400	1.000	.2	.6	.0	.0	2.5
Clint Capela	65	59	23.9	.643	–	.531	8.1	1.0	.5	1.2	12.6
Sam Dekker	77	2	18.4	.473	.321	.559	3.7	1.0	.5	.3	6.5
Tyler Ennis‡	31	0	6.3	.391	.375	.667	.6	1.1	.2	.0	1.9
Eric Gordon	75	15	31.0	.406	.372	.840	2.7	2.5	.6	.5	16.2
James Harden	81	81	36.4	.440	.347	.847	8.1	11.2	1.5	.5	29.1
Montrezl Harrell	58	14	18.3	.652	.143	.628	3.8	1.1	.3	.7	9.1
K. J. McDaniels‡	29	0	7.3	.456	.333	.900	1.0	.1	.2	.3	2.8
Nenê	67	8	17.9	.617	.333	.589	4.2	1.0	.8	.6	9.1
Chinanu Onuaku	5	1	10.4	.714	–	1.000	2.0	.6	.6	.2	2.8
Isaiah Taylor	4	0	13.0	.143	.000	.500	.8	.8	.3	.3	.8
Lou Williams	23	0	25.7	.386	.318	.867	3.0	2.4	.7	.4	14.9
Troy Williams	6	3	23.2	.500	.381	.857	4.0	1.0	.5	.2	9.7
Kyle Wiltjer	14	0	3.1	.286	.308	.500	.7	.1	.2	.1	.9

^{‡}Traded mid-season

=== Postseason ===
Houston Rockets statistics
Player	GP	GS	MPG	FG%	3P%	FT%	RPG	APG	SPG	BPG	PPG
Ryan Anderson	11	9	30.5	.391	.283	.875	5.2	.6	.4	.2	9.4
Trevor Ariza	11	11	37.5	.423	.377	.929	5.1	2.1	1.3	.2	10.7
Patrick Beverley	11	11	29.5	.413	.404	.786	5.5	3.0	1.5	.2	11.1
Bobby Brown	5	0	4.4	.500	.455	–	.4	.2	.0	.0	5.0
Clint Capela	11	11	26.0	.561	.000	.615	8.7	1.1	.7	2.5	10.5
Sam Dekker	4	0	7.8	.250	.500	–	2.5	.3	.3	.3	2.3
Eric Gordon	11	2	32.5	.421	.386	.722	3.9	2.0	.7	.5	12.9
James Harden	11	11	37.0	.413	.278	.878	5.5	8.5	1.9	.5	28.5
Montrezl Harrell	5	0	4.2	.333	–	.500	1.2	.4	.0	.0	1.0
Nenê	9	0	17.9	.706	.000	.581	4.7	.6	.7	.4	10.0
Isaiah Taylor	3	0	3.3	.000	.000	–	.7	.3	.0	.0	.0
Lou Williams	11	0	24.7	.424	.308	.897	2.7	1.3	.6	.1	12.5
Troy Williams	5	0	3.8	.000	.000	.500	1.4	.2	.0	.0	.2
Kyle Wiltjer	1	0	5.0	1.000	1.000	–	.0	.0	.0	.0	3.0

== Injuries ==
Player	Duration		Injury type	Games missed
Player	Start	End	Injury type	Games missed
Patrick Beverley	October 2, 2016	November 17, 2016	Left knee surgery	11
Montrezl Harrell	November 18, 2016	November 20, 2016	Left calf contusion	1
Clint Capela	December 17, 2016	January 17, 2017	Fractured fibula	15
Patrick Beverley	December 26, 2016	December 29, 2016	Thigh bruise	1
Patrick Beverley	December 31, 2016	January 5, 2017	Sprained right wrist	2
Eric Gordon	January 8, 2017	January 13, 2017	Sprained left big toe	2
Ryan Anderson	January 17, 2017	January 23, 2017	Illness (flu)	3
Eric Gordon	January 25, 2017	January 29, 2017	Lower back tightness	2
Nenê	February 3, 2017	February 8, 2017	Sore groin	1
Eric Gordon	February 9, 2017	February 15, 2017	Lower back soreness	2
Ryan Anderson	March 6, 2017	March 10, 2017	Lower back tightness	1
Ryan Anderson	March 24, 2017	April 7, 2017	Sprained right ankle	6
James Harden	April 2, 2017	April 5, 2017	Illness (flu)	1
Sam Dekker	April 2, 2017	May 1, 2017	Fractured left hand	10
Nenê	May 7, 2017	Rest of season	Torn left adductor muscle	2

== Transactions ==
=== Trades ===
September 22, 2016	To Houston Rockets Tyler Ennis	To Milwaukee Bucks Michael Beasley
February 21, 2017	To Houston Rockets Lou Williams	To Los Angeles Lakers Corey Brewer; First-round draft pick (2017)
February 23, 2017	To Houston Rockets Cash considerations	To Brooklyn Nets K. J. McDaniels
February 23, 2017	To Houston Rockets Marcelo Huertas	To Los Angeles Lakers Tyler Ennis

=== Free agents ===
Re-signed

Player	Signed	Contract	Ref.
James Harden	July 9, 2016	4 years, $118 million	

Additions

Player	Signed	Contract	Former team	Ref.
Mike D'Antoni (head coach)	May 26, 2016	4 years, $17 million	Philadelphia 76ers (associate coach)	
Ryan Anderson	July 9, 2016	4 years, $80 million	New Orleans Pelicans	
Eric Gordon	July 9, 2016	4 years, $53 million	New Orleans Pelicans	
Nenê	July 19, 2016	1 year, $2.9 million	Washington Wizards	
Pablo Prigioni	July 28, 2016	2 years, $2.2 million	Los Angeles Clippers	
Bobby Brown	September 23, 2016	1 year, $980,000	(Turkey) Beşiktaş Sompo Japan	
Kyle Wiltjer	September 23, 2016	2 years, $1.4 million	Gonzaga Bulldogs (NCAA)	
Isaiah Taylor	February 27, 2017	3 years, $3.1 million	Rio Grande Valley Vipers	
Troy Williams	March 10, 2017	10-day contract	Iowa Energy	

Subtractions

Player	Reason left	Date	New team	Ref.
Andrew Goudelock	Waived	July 9, 2016	(Israel) Maccabi Tel Aviv	
Terrence Jones	Free Agency	July 9, 2016	New Orleans Pelicans	
Jason Terry	Free Agency	July 9, 2016	Milwaukee Bucks	
Josh Smith	Free Agency	July 9, 2016	(China) Sichuan Blue Whales	
Dwight Howard	Free Agency	July 12, 2016	Atlanta Hawks	
Pablo Prigioni	Waived	October 24, 2016	(Spain) Saski Baskonia	
Donatas Motiejūnas	Free Agency	December 15, 2016	New Orleans Pelicans	
Marcelo Huertas	Waived	February 25, 2017	None	

== Awards, records and milestones ==
=== Awards ===
Player	Award	Date awarded	Ref.
James Harden	Western Conference Player of the Week	November 14, 2016	
James Harden	Western Conference Player of the Week	December 19, 2016	
James Harden	Western Conference Player of the Week	January 2, 2017	
James Harden	Western Conference Player of the Month (December)	January 3, 2017	
Mike D'Antoni	Western Conference Coach of the Month (December)	January 4, 2017	
James Harden	Western Conference All-Star	January 19, 2017	
Eric Gordon	NBA Three-Point Contest Champion	February 18, 2017	
James Harden	Western Conference Player of the Week	March 27, 2017	
James Harden	All-NBA First Team	May 18, 2017	

=== Records ===
- On November 12, James Harden became the first player in NBA history to record at least 24 points and 12 assists in six consecutive games.
- On November 14, James Harden became the first player in NBA history to record 30-plus points and 120-plus assists in their team's first 10 games.
- On November 25, the Rockets attempted 50 three-pointers in a win against the Kings, setting an NBA record for most three-pointers attempted in a game, breaking the previous record of 49 set by Dallas in 1996.
- On November 29, the Rockets hit 10-plus three-pointers in their 17th consecutive game, setting an NBA record. The streak would last until December 20, ending at 27 straight games.
- On December 7, Eric Gordon made eight 3-pointers in a 134–95 win against the Los Angeles Lakers, the most threes made by a player coming off the bench in franchise history.
- On December 16, the Rockets made 24 three-pointers on 61 attempts in a win against the Pelicans, both setting an NBA record.
- On December 31, James Harden recorded 53 points along with 16 rebounds and 17 assists, becoming the first player to record a 50–15–15 game in NBA history, and tying Wilt Chamberlain for most points scored in a triple-double. It was a new career high in points for Harden as well as tying his career high in assists. The 53 points scored by Harden set a new record for the most points scored on New Year's Eve in NBA history.
- The Rockets went 15–2 in the month of December, tying their franchise record for most wins in a calendar month (November 1996).
- The Rockets made 279 three-pointers in December, shattering the old NBA record of 227 for most 3's made in a single month.
- The Rockets became the first team since the Golden State Warriors in March 1992 to score 2,000 points in a single calendar month.
- On January 2, James Harden became the first Rocket to record three straight triple-doubles.
- On January 6, James Harden's streak of 53 straight games of making a three-pointer came to an end against the Magic, a franchise record for most consecutive games with a 3-pointer.
- On January 10, James Harden became just the fourth player in NBA history record a 40-point triple-double in consecutive games.
- On January 27, James Harden recorded a 51-point, 13 rebound, 13 assist triple-double, becoming the first player in NBA history to record two 50-point triple-doubles in the same season, and tying Oscar Robertson for the most 40-point triple-doubles in a single season with five.
- On March 1, the Rockets scored 100-plus points in their 48th consecutive game, setting a franchise record.
- On March 4, Eric Gordon made his 180th three-pointer this season as a reserve, setting an NBA record for most three-pointers made by a player off the bench in a season.

=== Milestones ===
- On November 9, James Harden passed Vernon Maxwell for most three-point attempts in Rockets history with 2,242.
- On November 19, James Harden passed Robert Reid for 7th on the Rockets' all-time scoring list.
- On December 2, James Harden became the first Rocket to make a three-pointer in each of the first 20 games of the season.
- On December 10, Trevor Ariza passed Shane Battier for 4th all-time in Rockets' history in 3-pointers made with 780.
- On December 14, James Harden recorded his 14th career triple-double as a Rocket, tying Hakeem Olajuwon for most in franchise history. Harden would pass Olajuwon by recording his 15th in his very next game against the Pelicans.
- On December 20, James Harden passed Yao Ming for 6th on the Rockets' all-time scoring list with 9,248 points.
- On December 26, James Harden passed Kenny Smith for 5th all-time in franchise history for assists with 2,459.
- On January 15, James Harden passed Mike Newlin for 4th place all-time in Rockets' history in assists with 2,582.
- On January 27, James Harden passed Steve Francis for 5th all-time in franchise history in steals with 920.
- On February 3, James Harden scored his 10,000th career point as a Rocket, becoming just the sixth Rocket ever to reach that milestone for the franchise.
