= Bryn Forbes =

American basketball player (born 1993)

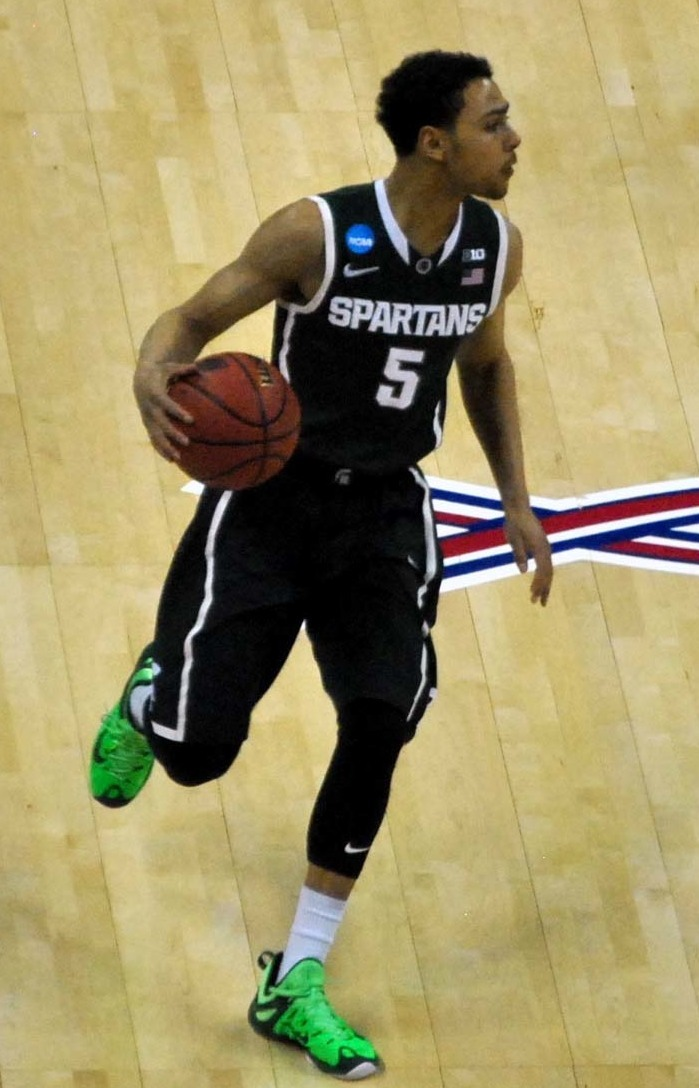
- Forbes with Michigan State in 2014

No. 11 – Râmnicu Vâlcea
- Position: Shooting guard / point guard
- League: Liga Națională

Personal information
- Born: July 23, 1993 (age 33) Lansing, Michigan, U.S.
- Listed height: 6 ft 2 in (1.88 m)
- Listed weight: 195 lb (88 kg)

Career information
- High school: J. W. Sexton (Lansing, Michigan)
- College: Cleveland State (2012–2014); Michigan State (2014–2016)
- NBA draft: 2016: undrafted
- Playing career: 2016–present

Career history
- 2016–2020: San Antonio Spurs
- 2016–2017: →Austin Spurs
- 2020–2021: Milwaukee Bucks
- 2021–2022: San Antonio Spurs
- 2022: Denver Nuggets
- 2022–2023: Minnesota Timberwolves
- 2025: Mets de Guaynabo
- 2025: Santeros de Aguada
- 2025–2026: Aris Thessaloniki
- 2026–present: Râmnicu Vâlcea

Career highlights
- NBA champion (2021); Second-team All-Big Ten (2016); Second-team All-Horizon League (2014); Horizon League Newcomer of the Year (2013); Horizon League All-Newcomer Team (2013)
- Stats at NBA.com
- Stats at Basketball Reference

Bryn Jerrel Forbes (born July 23, 1993) is an American professional basketball player for Râmnicu Vâlcea of the Liga Națională. He played college basketball for Cleveland State and Michigan State, and became a reliable three-point shooter. He plays both guard positions.

== High school career ==
Forbes averaged 13.6 points as a junior, helping Sexton to a 26–2 record and a state championship. He scored 29 points in the 2011 Class B semifinals against Detroit Country Day.

Forbes averaged 19.0 points, 5.0 rebounds and 3.0 assists as a senior at Sexton. Playing alongside Denzel Valentine and Anthony Clemmons, they won back-to-back Class B State Championships in 2011 and 2012. He connected on 60 three-pointers as a senior and scored 19 points in the 2012 Class B title game against Stevensville Lakeshore, adding seven assists, following a 19-point effort in the semifinals against Detroit Country Day. He was named a Lansing State Journal Dream Team member and was a Class B All-State selection for the Detroit Free Press and The Detroit News.

He was not heavily recruited and did not receive any of the major attention that Denzel Valentine and Anthony Clemmons received. ESPN listed him as Cleveland State's third best recruit in the 2012 recruiting class. Forbes received a two-star recruiting grade from ESPN and listed him as 85 overall (out of a scale or 0–100). He was the ranked the 92nd best shooting guard in the nation, the 77th best player in the Midwest Region, and the 11th best player in the state of Michigan. He signed with Cleveland State, his only major offer, on August 4, 2011.

== College career ==
=== Cleveland State (2012–2014) ===
Forbes played his freshman year at Cleveland State. He appeared in 32 games, starting 18, averaging 12.7 points, 3.5 rebounds and 1.2 assists in 28.3 minutes. Forbes led the team in scoring among players who played in more than six games. He ranked 11th in Horizon League in scoring and eighth in three-pointers per game (2.0) and in conference games, ranked seventh in scoring (14.9 ppg) and second in free-throw percentage (.908). Forbes scored in double figures in 24 contests, including four games of more than 20 points. His season-high of 24 points came against both Valparaiso (2/9/13), connecting on 8-of-10 shots, including 4-of-4 from three-point range, and Milwaukee (2/17/13), making 9-of-12 shots, including 4-of-7 from behind the arc. His other high scoring games came against Loyola with 22 points (1/23/13) and 21 against Detroit (1/12/13), adding a season-high eight rebounds against the Titans and matching the CSU single-game record with five three-pointers. Forbes collected eight rebounds at UIC (2/2/13) and dished out a season-high five assists against Notre Dame (Ohio) (12/19/12). His successful freshman year was rewarded with 2012–13 Horizon League Newcomer of the Year, Horizon League All-Newcomer Team, CollegeInsider.com Mid-Major Freshman All-America Team, and a two-time Horizon League Newcomer of the Week (Dec 3 and Jan. 14).

Forbes looked to improve going into his sophomore year. Still at Cleveland State, he started all 32 games in which he played, averaging 15.6 points, 3.1 rebounds and 1.7 assists in 34.4 minutes. His 15.6 points per game average led Cleveland State and ranked sixth in the Horizon League while he ranked second in the league in three-point field goals made (2.5 pg), trailing only Oakland's Travis Bader, the NCAA's all-time leading three-point shooter. Forbes led the team to a 21–12 record and 12–4 in the Horizon League. His efficiency improved heavily as he ranked fourth in the Horizon League in three-point field-goal percentage (.424), fifth in free-throw percentage (.826) and fourth in minutes played (34.4 mpg). Forbes broke records when he established a Cleveland State single-season school record with 81 made three-pointers, making at least one three-pointer in every contest. Scoring came easy as he scored in double-figures in 26 of 32 games, including 10 contests with 20 points or more. He went perfect on his first 28 free throws of the season before missing. Season highs for scoring against both Notre Dame (Ohio) with 27 points (12/18/13), matching the CSU single-game mark with five made three-pointers, and Detroit (1/31/14), adding a season-high seven rebounds against the Titans. Forbes proved his ability to play on the big stage when he tallied 22 points and five rebounds at the University of Kentucky (11/25/13), making 11-of-11 attempts from the foul line. He earned second-team NABC All-District 12 and second-Team All-Horizon League honors.

=== Michigan State (2014–2016) ===
Going into his junior year, Forbes decided to transfer. He wanted to come to Michigan State in part to be closer to home to take care of his young son and be near a family member with a medical issue. Forbes was granted a waiver to play for the Spartans in the 2014–15 season. NCAA rules typically require transfer players to sit out one year, but the NCAA waivers are granted for athletes who transfer because of family hardship. Forbes still had two seasons of eligibility remaining at Michigan State.

Forbes looked to make an immediate impact due to the massive turnover from the previous season. Michigan State lost guards, Keith Appling, Gary Harris, and Russell Byrd. Three post players who displayed shooting ability also left, Adreian Payne, Kenny Kaminski, and Alex Gauna. Forbes appeared in 39 games, starting 24, averaging 8.5 points, 1.4 rebounds and 1.0 assists in 26.2 minutes per game. Forbes' sharp shooting continued as he ranked fourth in the Big Ten in three-point field-goal percentage overall (.427), eighth in Big Ten games (.405), and 12th in the Big Ten in three-point field goals made overall (1.8). He scored in double figures in 14 games, including a season-high 21 points at Wisconsin (3/1/15) and led MSU in scoring in three games against Eastern Michigan (12/17/14; 14 points), Rutgers (1/29/15; 18 points) and Wisconsin (3/1/15; 21 points). Forbes made two or more three-pointers in 19 games, including five games with four or more three-pointers, highlighted by a perfect 5-of-5 effort from behind the arc at Wisconsin (3/1/15). Forbes shot a perfect 7-of-7 from the field, including 4-of-4 from three-point range en route to 18 points at Notre Dame (12/3/14). He ranked fourth on the team with 23 steals, highlighted by three steals at Nebraska (1/24/15). He shot .808 (42–52) from the foul line, ranking second on the team and shot .450 (9–20) from three-point range during MSU's NCAA Tournament run to the Final Four. He scored 14 points in two NCAA Tournament games against Georgia (3/20/15) in the second round and Louisville (3/29/15) in the Elite Eight and scored the first five points of overtime in MSU's Elite Eight overtime victory, knocking down a three-pointer on the first possession of the extra stanza. His career-best of four assists against Arkansas-Pine Bluff came on December 6.

Forbes' senior year was one of much improvement. He became one of the country's top three-point shooters, making close to 50%. He was the recipient of many awards and records during his senior year at Michigan State. On March 2, 2016, Forbes hit a team and Big Ten Conference record 11 three-point field goals, while leading Michigan State to a 97–66 win over Rutgers. Forbes, along with Denzel Valentine, was selected to the NCAA College Basketball Three-Point Contest following his senior year. Forbes was beaten by his teammate in the first round of the competition. Forbes was named USBWA All-District V 1st Team, Media All-Big Ten second eam, Coaches All-Big Ten second team, and PIT All-Tournament Team.

== Professional career ==
=== San Antonio Spurs (2016–2020) ===
After going undrafted in the 2016 NBA draft, Forbes joined the San Antonio Spurs for the 2016 NBA Summer League. Heading into the Summer League, Spurs' head coach Gregg Popovich told Forbes "to shoot it" after he made 77-of-100 three-pointers at one of his NBA pre-draft workouts. On July 14, 2016, he signed with the Spurs. Forbes secured an opening-night roster spot after impressing the Spurs during training camp and preseason. Forbes played sparingly for the Spurs throughout his rookie season, spending most of his time in the NBA Development League on assignment with the Austin Spurs. On April 7, 2017, with Tony Parker, Manu Ginóbili and Kawhi Leonard not playing, Forbes scored a career-high 27 points to lead the Spurs to a 102–89 win over the Dallas Mavericks. Forbes, who had 64 points for the season with a game high of eight coming in, went 4 of 9 from 3-point range and also had career highs in minutes (29) and assists (six).

In July 2017, Forbes earned All-NBA Summer League Second Team honors for his efforts during the 2017 NBA Summer League. On November 3, 2017, he scored 22 points in a 108–101 win over the Charlotte Hornets. On November 11, he made his first career start and scored 13 points in a 133–94 win over the Chicago Bulls, becoming the third undrafted player under 6-foot-4 to start a game in San Antonio franchise history, joining Avery Johnson and Anthony Carter. He made his third career start on December 16 against the Dallas Mavericks, joining Avery Johnson as only the second undrafted player under 6-foot-4 in Spurs history to start 3-plus games. On January 28, 2018, he scored a season-high 23 points in a 113–98 win over the Sacramento Kings.

On July 20, 2018, Forbes re-signed with the Spurs. In the Spurs' season opener on October 17, Forbes had 11 points in his first start at point guard for the team in a 112–108 win over the Minnesota Timberwolves. On October 24, he scored 15 points in a 116–96 loss to the Indiana Pacers, becoming the first starting point guard for the Spurs other than Tony Parker to score in double figures in each of his first four games since Maurice Cheeks in 1989. On November 10, he scored 13 points in a 96–89 win over the Houston Rockets, thus scoring double figures in nine of 11 games to begin the season. The only other Spurs player to top that in his first three seasons was Tim Duncan, who had 10 in 1998. On December 11, he had his first career double-double with a season-high 24 points and a career-best 11 rebounds in a 111–86 win over the Phoenix Suns. It was the first double-double of his basketball career, having never had a double-double stemming back to when he started basketball in elementary school. On December 13, in a 125–87 win over the Los Angeles Clippers, Forbes joined Danny Green and Gary Neal as the only Spurs players to score 1,000 points and make 150 3-pointers in their first 150 games with the team. In March 2019, Forbes reached 250 career 3-pointers, joining Neal and Dāvis Bertāns as the only players in Spurs history to accomplish that feat in their first three seasons with the team.

=== Milwaukee Bucks (2020–2021) ===
On November 26, 2020, the Milwaukee Bucks announced that they had signed Forbes. Forbes scored a career high 30 points against the Houston Rockets on April 29, 2021. He averaged 10.0 points per game, 1.6 rebounds, while shooting a career high from 3-point range (45%) and from the field (47%) in the regular season. In game 4 of the first-round series against the Miami Heat, Forbes scored 22 points on efficient shooting off the bench, tying his career playoff high he set in game 2 of the same series. Notably, he outscored Heat star Jimmy Butler in the contest to clinch the series sweep. Forbes became an NBA Champion when the Bucks won the 2021 NBA Finals in six games against the Phoenix Suns. He played in 20 of the Bucks’ 23 playoff games and averaged 6.6 points, 1.4 rebounds, and shot 37% from 3 in 13.7 minutes per game.

=== Return to San Antonio (2021–2022) ===
On August 25, 2021, Forbes signed with the San Antonio Spurs. He played in 40 games for the Spurs, averaging 9.1 points in 16.9 minutes per game before he was traded to the Denver Nuggets.

=== Denver Nuggets (2022) ===
On January 19, 2022, Forbes was traded to the Denver Nuggets in a three-team trade involving the Boston Celtics.

=== Minnesota Timberwolves (2022–2023) ===
On July 11, 2022, Forbes signed with the Minnesota Timberwolves. He was waived by the Timberwolves on February 9, 2023.

=== Mets de Guaynabo (2025) ===
On April 23, 2025, Forbes signed with the Mets de Guaynabo of the Baloncesto Superior Nacional for the remainder of the 2025 season.

=== Santeros de Aguada (2025) ===
On May 20, 2025, Forbes signed with the Santeros de Aguada of the Baloncesto Superior Nacional (BSN).

=== Aris Thessaloniki (2025–2026) ===
On July 18, 2025, Forbes signed with Aris Thessaloniki of the Greek Basketball League and the EuroCup. On March 2, 2026, he was released from the Greek club.

=== Râmnicu Vâlcea (2026–present) ===
On March 2, 2026, Forbes signed with Râmnicu Vâlcea of the Liga Națională.

== Career statistics ==
Legend
GP	Games played	GS	Games started	MPG	Minutes per game
FG%	Field goal percentage	3P%	3-point field goal percentage	FT%	Free throw percentage
RPG	Rebounds per game	APG	Assists per game	SPG	Steals per game
BPG	Blocks per game	PPG	Points per game	**Bold**	Career high
†	Won an NBA championship	*	Led the league

=== Regular season ===
Year	Team	GP	GS	MPG	FG%	3P%	FT%	RPG	APG	SPG	BPG	PPG
2016–17	San Antonio	36	0	7.9	.364	.321	.833	.6	.6	.0	.0	2.6
2017–18	San Antonio	80	12	19.0	.421	.390	.667	1.4	1.0	.4	.0	6.9
2018–19	San Antonio	**82***	**81**	**28.0**	.456	.426	.885	**2.9**	**2.1**	**.5**	.0	**11.8**
2019–20	San Antonio	63	62	25.1	.417	.388	.833	2.0	1.7	**.5**	.0	11.2
2020–21†	Milwaukee	70	10	19.3	**.473**	**.452**	.770	1.6	.6	.3	.0	10.0
2021–22	San Antonio	40	1	16.9	.432	.417	.898	1.6	1.0	.4	**.1**	9.1
2021–22	Denver	35	1	17.4	.424	.410	.921	.9	1.0	.2	**.1**	8.6
2022–23	Minnesota	25	0	10.7	.361	.304	**1.000**	.6	.7	.3	.1	3.6
Career		431	167	19.9	.436	.410	.826	1.7	1.2	.4	.0	8.8

=== Playoffs ===
Year	Team	GP	GS	MPG	FG%	3P%	FT%	RPG	APG	SPG	BPG	PPG
2017	San Antonio	6	0	12.2	.286	.222	**1.000**	1.0	.5	.0	**.2**	3.3
2018	San Antonio	4	0	13.5	.294	.222	.714	.8	.5	.0	.0	4.3
2019	San Antonio	7	**7**	**30.3**	**.482**	**.484**	.667	**3.6**	1.0	.1	.1	**10.7**
2021†	Milwaukee	**20**	0	13.7	.411	.371	.750	1.4	.3	.1	.1	6.6
2022	Denver	5	0	15.2	.400	.364	.800	.6	**1.4**	**.2**	.0	4.0
Career		42	7	16.4	.407	.376	.771	1.5	.6	.1	.1	6.3

=== College ===
Year	Team	GP	GS	MPG	FG%	3P%	FT%	RPG	APG	SPG	BPG	PPG
2012–13	Cleveland State	32	18	28.3	.433	.389	.804	3.5	1.2	**.8**	.0	12.7
2013–14	Cleveland State	32	32	**34.4**	.434	.424	.826	**3.1**	1.7	**.8**	.0	**15.6**
2014–15	Michigan State	**39**	24	26.2	.447	.427	.808	1.4	1.0	.6	**.1**	8.5
2015–16	Michigan State	35	**34**	28.1	**.481**	**.481**	**.840**	2.1	1.5	.4	.0	14.4
Career		138	108	29.1	.449	.435	.821	2.5	1.3	.6	.1	12.6

== Personal life ==
Forbes has two sons, born in 2013 and 2016.

On February 15, 2023, Forbes was arrested in north-central San Antonio on suspicion of assault with bodily injury. He had reportedly engaged in a verbal argument with his girlfriend Elsa Jean, whom he later struck multiple times. The San Antonio Fire Department and Emergency Medical Services arrived at the scene and provided aid to the woman. Forbes was booked at the Bexar County Jail. Those charges were dismissed on July 19, 2023.

On February 13, 2024, Forbes was once again arrested on charges of assault. According to police reports, Forbes entered the apartment of “an ex-significant other” – the mother of his two children – and proceeded to hit and choke her until she was eventually able to break free and seek authorities. Forbes reportedly fled the scene soon afterwards.

== See also ==
- List of National Basketball Association career 3-point field goal percentage leaders
