= 2016–17 San Antonio Spurs season =

- Division champions
- Head coach: Gregg Popovich
- President: Gregg Popovich; Monty Williams (vice)
- General manager: R. C. Buford
- Owners: Spurs Sports & Entertainment
- Arena: AT&T Center

Results
- Record: 61–21 (.744)
- Place: Division: 1st (Southwest); Conference: 2nd (Western)
- Playoff finish: Western Conference Finals (lost to Warriors 0–4)
- Stats at Basketball Reference

Local media
- Television: Fox Sports Southwest; KENS HD; CW 35
- Radio: 1200 WOAI

The 2016–17 San Antonio Spurs season was the franchise's 50th season, its 44th season in the San Antonio area, and its 41st in the National Basketball Association (NBA). This season was the team's first since 1996–97 without longtime team cornerstone Tim Duncan; Duncan retired from the NBA on July 11, 2016 as a five-time champion and the first NBA player ever to win championships in three straight decades.

The Spurs finished the regular season with a 61–21 record, securing the second seed in the Western Conference playoffs for the second straight year. In the first round of the playoffs, the Spurs defeated the Memphis Grizzlies in six games. In the Western Conference Semifinals, they defeated the Houston Rockets in six games. In the Western Conference Finals, the Spurs were swept by the eventual NBA champion Golden State Warriors in four games. This was San Antonio's first time being swept in the playoffs since the 2010 Western Conference semifinals, when they were defeated by the Steve Nash-led Phoenix Suns.

Until 2026, this was the last time the Spurs won at least 60 games in a season.

== Season synopsis ==
=== Preseason ===
The 2016 NBA draft was held on June 23, 2016, at the Barclays Center in Brooklyn. The Spurs chose guard Dejounte Murray with the 29th pick of the first round.

On July 11, Tim Duncan announced his retirement from the NBA.

=== Regular season ===
On March 8, with a 114–104 win over the Sacramento Kings the Spurs extended their league record for consecutive 50+ win seasons to 18 straight.

On April 4, with a 95–89(OT) win over the Memphis Grizzlies the Spurs secured their first back to back 60+ win seasons in team history.

=== Playoffs ===
The San Antonio Spurs were eliminated 4–0 by the Golden State Warriors in the Western Conference finals.

== Draft ==
Round	Pick	Player	Position	Nationality	School / club team
1	29	Dejounte Murray	PG	United States	Washington

== Roster ==
2016–17 San Antonio Spurs roster
Players

Pos.	No.	Player	Height	Weight	DOB	From
PF/C	12	LaMarcus Aldridge	6 ft 11 in (2.11 m)	260 lb (118 kg)	1985-07-19	Texas
SF	1	Kyle Anderson	6 ft 9 in (2.06 m)	230 lb (104 kg)	1993-09-20	UCLA
C	30	Joel Anthony	6 ft 9 in (2.06 m)	245 lb (111 kg)	1982-08-09	UNLV
PF	42	Dāvis Bertāns	6 ft 10 in (2.08 m)	210 lb (95 kg)	1992-11-12	Latvia
C	3	Dewayne Dedmon	7 ft 0 in (2.13 m)	245 lb (111 kg)	1989-08-12	USC
SG	11	Bryn Forbes	6 ft 3 in (1.91 m)	190 lb (86 kg)	1993-07-23	Michigan State
C	16	Pau Gasol	7 ft 0 in (2.13 m)	250 lb (113 kg)	1980-07-06	Spain
SG	20	Manu Ginóbili	6 ft 6 in (1.98 m)	205 lb (93 kg)	1977-07-28	Argentina
SG	14	Danny Green	6 ft 6 in (1.98 m)	215 lb (98 kg)	1987-06-22	North Carolina
PF	10	David Lee	6 ft 9 in (2.06 m)	245 lb (111 kg)	1983-04-29	Florida
SF	2	Kawhi Leonard	6 ft 7 in (2.01 m)	230 lb (104 kg)	1991-06-29	San Diego State
PG	8	Patty Mills	6 ft 0 in (1.83 m)	185 lb (84 kg)	1988-08-11	Saint Mary's
PG	5	Dejounte Murray	6 ft 5 in (1.96 m)	170 lb (77 kg)	1996-09-19	Washington
PG	9	Tony Parker	6 ft 2 in (1.88 m)	185 lb (84 kg)	1982-05-17	France
SG	17	Jonathon Simmons	6 ft 6 in (1.98 m)	195 lb (88 kg)	1989-09-14	Houston

Coaches
Head coach
- Gregg Popovich
Assistant(s)
- Ettore Messina
- Ime Udoka
- James Borrego
- Chip Engelland
- Becky Hammon
- Will Hardy
- Will Sevening (trainer)

Legend
- (DP) Unsigned draft pick
- (FA) Free agent
- (S) Suspended
- Injured

Roster
Updated: March 27, 2017

== Standings ==
=== Division ===
Southwest Division	W	L	PCT	GB	Home	Road	Div	GP
y – San Antonio Spurs	61	21	.744	–	31‍–‍10	30‍–‍11	11–5	82
x – Houston Rockets	55	27	.671	6.0	30‍–‍11	25‍–‍16	10–6	82
x – Memphis Grizzlies	43	39	.524	18.0	24‍–‍17	19‍–‍22	8–8	82
e – New Orleans Pelicans	34	48	.415	27.0	21‍–‍20	13‍–‍28	6–10	82
e – Dallas Mavericks	33	49	.402	28.0	21‍–‍20	12‍–‍29	5–11	82

=== Conference ===
Western Conference
#	Team	W	L	PCT	GB	GP
1	z – Golden State Warriors *	67	15	.817	–	82
2	y – San Antonio Spurs *	61	21	.744	6.0	82
3	x – Houston Rockets	55	27	.671	12.0	82
4	x – Los Angeles Clippers	51	31	.622	16.0	82
5	y – Utah Jazz *	51	31	.622	16.0	82
6	x – Oklahoma City Thunder	47	35	.573	20.0	82
7	x – Memphis Grizzlies	43	39	.524	24.0	82
8	x – Portland Trail Blazers	41	41	.500	26.0	82
9	e – Denver Nuggets	40	42	.488	27.0	82
10	e – New Orleans Pelicans	34	48	.415	33.0	82
11	e – Dallas Mavericks	33	49	.402	34.0	82
12	e – Sacramento Kings	32	50	.390	35.0	82
13	e – Minnesota Timberwolves	31	51	.378	36.0	82
14	e – Los Angeles Lakers	26	56	.317	41.0	82
15	e – Phoenix Suns	24	58	.293	43.0	82

== Game log ==
=== Pre-season ===
2016 pre-season game log
Total: 4–2 (home: 2–1; road: 2–1)
Pre-season: 4–2 (home: 2–1; road: 2–1)

Game	Date	Team	Score	High points	High rebounds	High assists	Location Attendance	Record
1	October 3	@ Phoenix	L 86–91	Kawhi Leonard (17)	Bryn Forbes (7)	Nicolas Laprovittola (4)	Talking Stick Resort Arena; 8,076	0–1
2	October 8	Atlanta	W 102–91	Tony Parker (15)	LaMarcus Aldridge (6)	Gasol, Green, Lee, Mills (3)	AT&T Center; 18,555	1–1
3	October 10	@ Detroit	W 86–81	Kawhi Leonard (20)	LaMarcus Aldridge (9)	Laprovittola, Parker (4)	The Palace of Auburn Hills; 12,103	2–1
4	October 12	@ Orlando	W 95–89	Pau Gasol (14)	Dewayne Dedmon (7)	Pau Gasol (4)	Amway Center; 15,092	3–1
5	October 14	Miami	L 100–108	Dedmon, Leonard (11)	Kyle Anderson (7)	Tony Parker (4)	AT&T Center; 18,418	3–2
6	October 21	Houston	W 114–99	Bryn Forbes (19)	Pau Gasol (9)	Ryan Arcidiacono (6)	AT&T Center; 18,418	4–2

2016–17 season schedule

=== Regular season ===
2016–17 game log
Total: 61–21 (home: 31–10; road: 30–11)
October: 4–0 (home: 1–0; road: 3–0)

Game	Date	Team	Score	High points	High rebounds	High assists	Location Attendance	Record
1	October 25	@ Golden State	W 129–100	Kawhi Leonard (35)	LaMarcus Aldridge (14)	Patty Mills (5)	Oracle Arena; 19,596	1–0
2	October 27	@ Sacramento	W 102–94	Kawhi Leonard (30)	Kyle Anderson (8)	Leonard, Ginobili (5)	Golden 1 Center; 17,608	2–0
3	October 29	New Orleans	W 98–79	Kawhi Leonard (20)	Pau Gasol (8)	Patty Mills (5)	AT&T Center; 18,418	3–0
4	October 30	@ Miami	W 106–99	Kawhi Leonard (27)	Gasol, Lee (11)	Kawhi Leonard (6)	American Airlines Arena; 19,678	4–0

November : 11–4 (home: 3–4; road: 8–0)

Game	Date	Team	Score	High points	High rebounds	High assists	Location Attendance	Record
5	November 1	Utah	L 91–106	Kawhi Leonard (30)	Pau Gasol (8)	Tony Parker (6)	AT&T Center; 18,418	4–1
6	November 4	@ Utah	W 100–86	Kawhi Leonard (29)	Kawhi Leonard (11)	Kawhi Leonard (4)	Vivint Smart Home Arena; 19,911	5–1
7	November 5	L. A. Clippers	L 92–116	LaMarcus Aldridge (19)	Leonard, Aldridge (6)	Mills, Laprovittola (5)	AT&T Center; 18,418	5–2
8	November 9	Houston	L 99–101	Kawhi Leonard (34)	Leonard, Gasol (7)	Patty Mills (10)	AT&T Center; 18,418	5–3
9	November 11	Detroit	W 96–86	Kawhi Leonard (21)	LaMarcus Aldridge (12)	Kawhi Leonard (6)	AT&T Center; 18,418	6–3
10	November 12	@ Houston	W 106–100	Kawhi Leonard (20)	LaMarcus Aldridge (10)	Pau Gasol (6)	Toyota Center; 18,055	7–3
11	November 14	Miami	W 94–90	Kawhi Leonard (24)	Kawhi Leonard (12)	Tony Parker (6)	AT&T Center; 18,418	8–3
12	November 16	@ Sacramento	W 110–105	LaMarcus Aldridge (21)	Pau Gasol (9)	Tony Parker (7)	AT&T Center; 17,608	9–3
13	November 18	@ L.A. Lakers	W 116–107	Leonard, Aldridge (23)	Kawhi Leonard (12)	Leonard, Parker (7)	Staples Center; 18,997	10–3
14	November 21	Dallas	W 96–91	Kawhi Leonard (24)	Kawhi Leonard (9)	Leonard, Murray, Green (4)	AT&T Center; 18,418	11–3
15	November 23	@ Charlotte	W 119–114	Kawhi Leonard (30)	Pau Gasol (8)	Pau Gasol (5)	Spectrum Center; 18,515	12–3
16	November 25	@ Boston	W 109–103	Kawhi Leonard (25)	Kawhi Leonard (10)	Leonard, Parker, Aldridge (4)	TD Garden; 18,624	13–3
17	November 26	@ Washington	W 112–100	LaMarcus Aldridge (24)	Pau Gasol (10)	Kawhi Leonard (5)	Verizon Center; 17,066	14–3
18	November 29	Orlando	L 83–95	Kawhi Leonard (21)	Dewayne Dedmon (8)	Gasol, Parker, Aldridge, Ginobili (4)	AT&T Center; 18,418	14–4
19	November 30	@ Dallas	W 94–87	Patty Mills (23)	Dewayne Dedmon (10)	Patty Mills (4)	American Airlines Center; 19,245	15–4

December : 12–2 (home: 7–0; road: 5–2)

Game	Date	Team	Score	High points	High rebounds	High assists	Location Attendance	Record
20	December 2	Washington	W 107–105	LaMarcus Aldridge (23)	Pau Gasol (10)	Patty Mills (8)	AT&T Center; 18,418	16–4
21	December 5	@ Milwaukee	W 97–96	Kawhi Leonard (21)	Leonard, Aldridge, Gasol (9)	Parker, Aldridge, Mills (5)	BMO Harris Bradley Center; 14,256	17–4
22	December 6	@ Minnesota	W 105–91	Kawhi Leonard (31)	Dewayne Dedmon (8)	Patty Mills (5)	Target Center; 12,585	18–4
23	December 8	@ Chicago	L 91–95	Kawhi Leonard (24)	Pau Gasol (10)	Parker, Leonard (5)	United Center; 21,489	18–5
24	December 10	Brooklyn	W 130–101	Kawhi Leonard (30)	LaMarcus Aldridge (9)	Tony Parker (7)	AT&T Center; 18,418	19–5
25	December 14	Boston	W 108–101	Kawhi Leonard (30)	Pau Gasol (13)	Tony Parker (7)	AT&T Center; 18,418	20–5
26	December 15	@ Phoenix	W 107–92	Gasol, Leonard (18)	Kawhi Leonard (10)	Kawhi Leonard (4)	Talking Stick Resort Arena; 17,165	21–5
27	December 18	New Orleans	W 113–100	LaMarcus Aldridge (22)	Pau Gasol (14)	Patty Mills (7)	AT&T Center; 18,615	22–5
28	December 20	@ Houston	W 102–100	Kawhi Leonard (21)	Aldridge, Gasol (10)	LaMarcus Aldridge (5)	Toyota Center; 18,055	23–5
29	December 22	@ LA Clippers	L 101–106	Kawhi Leonard (27)	Leonard, Gasol (9)	Kawhi Leonard (5)	Staples Center; 19,060	23–6
30	December 23	@ Portland	W 110–90	Kawhi Leonard (33)	LaMarcus Aldridge (14)	LaMarcus Aldridge (6)	Moda Center; 19,393	24–6
31	December 25	Chicago	W 119–100	LaMarcus Aldridge (33)	Kawhi Leonard (10)	Tony Parker (8)	AT&T Center; 18,428	25–6
32	December 28	Phoenix	W 119–98	LaMarcus Aldridge (27)	Pau Gasol (10)	Kyle Anderson (5)	AT&T Center; 18,418	26–6
33	December 30	Portland	W 110–94	Jonathon Simmons (19)	Kyle Anderson (8)	Tony Parker (5)	AT&T Center; 18,418	27–6

January : 10–5 (home: 6–2; road: 4–3)

Game	Date	Team	Score	High points	High rebounds	High assists	Location Attendance	Record
34	January 1	@ Atlanta	L 112–114 (OT)	LaMarcus Aldridge (27)	LaMarcus Aldridge (13)	Tony Parker (6)	Philips Arena; 18,088	27–7
35	January 3	Toronto	W 110–82	Kawhi Leonard (25)	LaMarcus Aldridge (8)	Tony Parker (8)	AT&T Center; 18,418	28–7
36	January 5	@ Denver	W 127–99	LaMarcus Aldridge (28)	Pau Gasol (9)	Tony Parker (9)	Pepsi Center; 14,391	29–7
37	January 7	Charlotte	W 102–85	Davis Bertans (21)	LaMarcus Aldridge (11)	Jonathon Simmons (5)	AT&T Center; 18,418	30–7
38	January 10	Milwaukee	L 107–109	Kawhi Leonard (30)	Pau Gasol (11)	Tony Parker (7)	AT&T Center; 18,418	30–8
39	January 12	L. A. Lakers	W 134–94	Kawhi Leonard (31)	Dewayne Dedmon (12)	Gasol, Parker (6)	AT&T Center; 18,418	31–8
40	January 14	@ Phoenix	L 105–108	Kawhi Leonard (38)	Pau Gasol (10)	Leonard, Ginobili (3)	Mexico City Arena (Mexico City); 20,532	31–9
41	January 17	Minnesota	W 122–114	Kawhi Leonard (34)	Leonard, Dedmon (7)	Leonard, Parker (5)	AT&T Center; 18,418	32–9
42	January 19	Denver	W 118–104	Kawhi Leonard (34)	David Lee (16)	LaMarcus Aldridge (6)	AT&T Center; 18,418	33–9
43	January 21	@ Cleveland	W 118–115 (OT)	Kawhi Leonard (41)	LaMarcus Aldridge (12)	Murray, Aldridge (6)	Quicken Loans Arena; 20,562	34–9
44	January 23	@ Brooklyn	W 112–86	Patty Mills (20)	LaMarcus Aldridge (9)	LaMarcus Aldridge (5)	Barclays Center; 16,643	35–9
45	January 24	@ Toronto	W 108–106	LaMarcus Aldridge (21)	Aldridge, Anderson, Green (7)	Kyle Anderson (4)	Air Canada Centre; 19,800	36–9
46	January 27	@ New Orleans	L 103–119	Kawhi Leonard (23)	LaMarcus Aldridge (14)	LaMarcus Aldridge (6)	Smoothie King Center; 17,757	36–10
47	January 29	Dallas	L 101–105	Kawhi Leonard (24)	Patty Mills (8)	Danny Green (5)	AT&T Center; 18,418	36–11
48	January 31	Oklahoma City	W 108–94	Kawhi Leonard (36)	Leonard, Dedmon (8)	Leonard, Parker, Ginobili (5)	AT&T Center; 18,418	37–11

February : 8–2 (home: 2–0; road: 6–2)

Game	Date	Team	Score	High points	High rebounds	High assists	Location Attendance	Record
49	February 2	Philadelphia	W 102–86	Kawhi Leonard (19)	Dewayne Dedmon (10)	Tony Parker (6)	AT&T Center; 18,418	38–11
50	February 4	Denver	W 121–97	Kawhi Leonard (19)	Kawhi Leonard (6)	Leonard, Anderson (5)	AT&T Center; 18,418	39–11
51	February 6	@ Memphis	L 74–89	David Lee (14)	Dewayne Dedmon (12)	Ginobili, Mills (3)	FedExForum; 16,708	39–12
52	February 8	@ Philadelphia	W 111–103	Kawhi Leonard (32)	Dewayne Dedmon (11)	Leonard, Parker (5)	Wells Fargo Center; 19,233	40–12
53	February 10	@ Detroit	W 103–92	Kawhi Leonard (32)	Dewayne Dedmon (17)	Tony Parker (12)	The Palace of Auburn Hills; 17,222	41–12
54	February 12	@ New York	L 90–94	Kawhi Leonard (36)	LaMarcus Aldridge (10)	Leonard, Parker, Ginobili (4)	Madison Square Garden; 19,812	41–13
55	February 13	@ Indiana	W 110–106	Kawhi Leonard (32)	Dewayne Dedmon (12)	Tony Parker (4)	Bankers Life Fieldhouse; 15,203	42–13
56	February 15	@ Orlando	W 107–79	LaMarcus Aldridge (23)	Dewayne Dedmon (11)	Tony Parker (8)	Amway Center; 17,101	43–13
57	February 24	@ L. A. Clippers	W 105–97	Kawhi Leonard (21)	Dewayne Dedmon (12)	Kawhi Leonard (6)	Staples Center; 19,060	44–13
58	February 26	@ L. A. Lakers	W 119–98	Kawhi Leonard (25)	Aldridge, Dedmon (9)	Tony Parker (9)	Staples Center; 18,997	45–13

March : 13–4 (home: 10–2; road: 3–2)

Game	Date	Team	Score	High points	High rebounds	High assists	Location Attendance	Record
59	March 1	Indiana	W 100–99	Kawhi Leonard (31)	Kawhi Leonard (10)	Dejounte Murray (6)	AT&T Center; 18,418	46–13
60	March 3	@ New Orleans	W 101–98 (OT)	Kawhi Leonard (31)	LaMarcus Aldridge (15)	Kawhi Leonard (6)	Smoothie King Center; 17,669	47–13
61	March 4	Minnesota	W 97–90 (OT)	Kawhi Leonard (34)	Aldridge, Leonard (10)	Kawhi Leonard (5)	AT&T Center; 18,418	48–13
62	March 6	Houston	W 112–110	Kawhi Leonard (39)	David Lee (8)	Leonard, Green (5)	AT&T Center; 18,418	49–13
63	March 8	Sacramento	W 114–104	Manu Ginóbili (19)	David Lee (10)	Patty Mills (10)	AT&T Center; 18,418	50–13
64	March 9	@ Oklahoma City	L 92–102	Kawhi Leonard (19)	Dewayne Dedmon (8)	Murray, Green (6)	Chesapeake Energy Arena; 18,203	50–14
65	March 11	Golden State	W 107–85	Patty Mills (21)	Kyle Anderson (8)	Ginobili, Anderson (6)	AT&T Center; 18,418	51–14
66	March 13	Atlanta	W 107–99	Kawhi Leonard (31)	Dewayne Dedmon (8)	Patty Mills (9)	AT&T Center; 18,418	52–14
67	March 15	Portland	L 106–110	Kawhi Leonard (34)	Kawhi Leonard (9)	Ginobili, Leonard, Mills (6)	AT&T Center; 18,418	52–15
68	March 18	@ Memphis	L 96–104	Kawhi Leonard (22)	Aldridge, Gasol (9)	LaMarcus Aldridge (4)	FedExForum; 18,119	52–16
69	March 19	Sacramento	W 118–102	Pau Gasol (22)	Pau Gasol (9)	Mills, Parker (7)	AT&T Center; 18,418	53–16
70	March 21	@ Minnesota	W 100–93	LaMarcus Aldridge (26)	Pau Gasol (6)	Tony Parker (5)	Target Center; 13,742	54–16
71	March 23	Memphis	W 97–90	LaMarcus Aldridge (23)	LaMarcus Aldridge (8)	Tony Parker (7)	AT&T Center; 18,418	55–16
72	March 25	New York	W 106–98	Kawhi Leonard (29)	Dewayne Dedmon (13)	Patty Mills (7)	AT&T Center; 18,418	56–16
73	March 27	Cleveland	W 103–74	Kawhi Leonard (25)	Dewayne Dedmon (13)	Patty Mills (6)	AT&T Center; 18,418	57–16
74	March 29	Golden State	L 98–110	Kawhi Leonard (19)	Pau Gasol (8)	Leonard, Gasol (5)	AT&T Center; 18,418	57–17
75	March 31	@ Oklahoma City	W 100–95	Kawhi Leonard (28)	LaMarcus Aldridge (10)	Manu Ginóbili (8)	Chesapeake Energy Arena; 18,203	58–17

April : 3–4 (home: 2–2; road: 1–2)

Game	Date	Team	Score	High points	High rebounds	High assists	Location Attendance	Record
76	April 2	Utah	W 109–103	Kawhi Leonard (25)	Pau Gasol (12)	Kawhi Leonard (7)	AT&T Center; 18,418	59–17
77	April 4	Memphis	W 95–89 (OT)	Kawhi Leonard (32)	Kawhi Leonard (12)	Tony Parker (7)	AT&T Center; 18,418	60–17
78	April 5	L. A. Lakers	L 95–102	Bertans, Parker (14)	Pau Gasol (8)	David Lee (6)	AT&T Center; 18,418	60–18
79	April 7	@ Dallas	W 102–89	Bryn Forbes (23)	Dedmon, Lee (13)	Bryn Forbes (6)	American Airlines Center; 20,133	61–18
80	April 8	L. A. Clippers	L 87–98	Kawhi Leonard (28)	Dewayne Dedmon (10)	Kawhi Leonard (5)	AT&T Center; 18,420	61–19
81	April 10	@ Portland	L 98–99	Kawhi Leonard (18)	Pau Gasol (13)	Tony Parker (4)	Moda Center; 19,393	61–20
82	April 12	@ Utah	L 97–101	LaMarcus Aldridge (18)	Dewayne Dedmon (8)	Patty Mills (5)	Vivint Smart Home Arena; 19,911	61–21

2016–17 season schedule

== Playoffs ==
2017 playoff game log
Total: 8–8 (home: 5–3; road: 3–5)
First Round: 4–2 (home: 3–0; road: 1–2)

Game	Date	Team	Score	High points	High rebounds	High assists	Location Attendance	Series
1	April 15	Memphis	W 111–82	Kawhi Leonard (32)	Dewayne Dedmon (8)	Kawhi Leonard (5)	AT&T Center; 18,418	1–0
2	April 17	Memphis	W 96–82	Kawhi Leonard (37)	Kawhi Leonard (11)	Ginobili, Mills (3)	AT&T Center; 18,418	2–0
3	April 20	@ Memphis	L 94–105	Kawhi Leonard (18)	LaMarcus Aldridge (11)	Anderson, Leonard, Simmons (3)	FedExForum; 18,119	2–1
4	April 22	@ Memphis	L 108–110 (OT)	Kawhi Leonard (43)	Pau Gasol (11)	Tony Parker (5)	FedExForum; 18,119	2–2
5	April 25	Memphis	W 116–103	Kawhi Leonard (28)	LaMarcus Aldridge (9)	Leonard, Parker (6)	AT&T Center; 18,418	3–2
6	April 27	@ Memphis	W 103–96	Kawhi Leonard (28)	LaMarcus Aldridge (12)	Leonard, Parker (4)	FedExForum; 18,119	4–2

Conference Semifinals: 4–2 (home: 2–1; road: 2–1)

Game	Date	Team	Score	High points	High rebounds	High assists	Location Attendance	Series
1	May 1	Houston	L 99–126	Kawhi Leonard (21)	Kawhi Leonard (11)	Kawhi Leonard (6)	AT&T Center; 18,418	0–1
2	May 3	Houston	W 121–96	Kawhi Leonard (34)	Pau Gasol (13)	Kawhi Leonard (8)	AT&T Center; 18,418	1–1
3	May 5	@ Houston	W 103–92	Aldridge, Leonard (26)	Kawhi Leonard (10)	Kawhi Leonard (7)	Toyota Center; 18,187	2–1
4	May 7	@ Houston	L 104–125	Jonathon Simmons (17)	Pau Gasol (7)	Patty Mills (5)	Toyota Center; 18,055	2–2
5	May 9	Houston	W 110–107 (OT)	Kawhi Leonard (22)	Kawhi Leonard (15)	Manu Ginóbili (5)	AT&T Center; 18,418	3–2
6	May 11	@ Houston	W 114–75	LaMarcus Aldridge (34)	LaMarcus Aldridge (12)	Patty Mills (7)	Toyota Center; 18,055	4–2

Conference Finals: 0–4 (home: 0–2; road: 0–2)

Game	Date	Team	Score	High points	High rebounds	High assists	Location Attendance	Series
1	May 14	@ Golden State	L 111–113	LaMarcus Aldridge (28)	Aldridge, Leonard (8)	Aldridge, Leonard, Mills (3)	Oracle Arena; 19,596	0–1
2	May 16	@ Golden State	L 100–136	Jonathon Simmons (22)	Dewayne Dedmon (9)	Dejounte Murray (6)	Oracle Arena; 19,596	0–2
3	May 20	Golden State	L 108–120	Manu Ginóbili (21)	Pau Gasol (10)	Patty Mills (6)	AT&T Center; 18,792	0–3
4	May 22	Golden State	L 115–129	Kyle Anderson (20)	Pau Gasol (9)	Ginóbili, Murray (7)	AT&T Center; 18,466	0–4

2017 playoff schedule

== Player statistics ==
Legend
GP	Games played	GS	Games started	MPG	Minutes per game
FG%	Field goal percentage	3P%	3-point field goal percentage	FT%	Free throw percentage
RPG	Rebounds per game	APG	Assists per game	SPG	Steals per game
BPG	Blocks per game	PPG	Points per game	**Bold**	Career high

=== Regular season ===
Player	GP	GS	MPG	FG%	3P%	FT%	RPG	APG	SPG	BPG	PPG
LaMarcus Aldridge	72	72	32.4	.477	.411	.812	7.3	1.9	.6	1.2	17.3
Kyle Anderson	72	14	14.2	.445	.375	.789	2.9	1.3	.7	.4	3.4
Joel Anthony	19	0	6.4	.625	.	.625	1.6	.2	.1	.3	1.3
Davis Bertans	67	6	12.1	.440	.399	.824	1.5	.7	.3	.4	4.5
Dewayne Dedmon	76	37	17.5	.622	.	.699	6.5	.6	.5	.8	5.1
Bryn Forbes	36	0	7.9	.364	.321	.833	.6	.6	.0	.0	2.6
Pau Gasol	64	39	25.4	.502	.538	.707	7.8	2.3	.4	1.1	12.4
Manu Ginóbili	69	0	18.7	.390	.392	.804	2.3	2.7	1.2	.2	7.5
Danny Green	68	68	26.6	.392	.379	.844	3.3	1.8	1.0	.8	7.3
Nicolás Laprovíttola	18	3	9.7	.426	.370	1.000	.6	1.6	.2	.1	3.3
David Lee	79	10	18.7	.590	.	.708	5.6	1.6	.4	.5	7.3
Kawhi Leonard	74	74	33.4	.485	.380	.880	5.8	3.5	1.8	.7	25.5
Patty Mills	80	8	21.9	.440	.414	.825	1.8	3.5	.8	.0	9.5
Dejounte Murray	38	8	8.5	.431	.391	.700	1.1	1.3	.2	.2	3.4
Tony Parker	63	63	25.2	.466	.333	.726	1.8	4.5	.5	.0	10.1
Jonathon Simmons	78	8	17.8	.420	.294	.750	2.1	1.6	.6	.3	6.2

=== Playoffs ===
Player	GP	GS	MPG	FG%	3P%	FT%	RPG	APG	SPG	BPG	PPG
LaMarcus Aldridge	16	16	33.6	.458	.143	.764	7.4	1.5	.6	1.0	16.5
Kyle Anderson	15	1	13.0	.563	.300	.727	3.1	1.7	.7	.1	5.5
Joel Anthony	3	0	5.0	.750	.	.000	1.3	.0	.0	.7	2.0
Davis Bertans	13	0	8.6	.444	.400	.667	1.5	.2	.2	.3	2.8
Dewayne Dedmon	12	3	8.1	.609	.	.531	3.9	.3	.2	.3	3.8
Bryn Forbes	6	0	12.2	.286	.222	1.000	1.0	.5	.0	.2	3.3
Pau Gasol	16	7	22.8	.439	.333	.708	7.1	1.9	.4	.9	7.7
Manu Ginóbili	16	1	17.8	.412	.225	.739	2.4	2.4	1.0	.1	6.6
Danny Green	16	16	27.3	.405	.342	.571	3.6	1.4	.6	.9	7.8
David Lee	15	4	16.3	.521	.000	.647	3.8	.7	.3	.3	4.1
Kawhi Leonard	12	12	35.8	.525	.455	.931	7.8	4.6	1.7	.5	27.7
Patty Mills	16	6	26.0	.407	.360	.864	2.1	2.7	.8	.1	10.3
Dejounte Murray	11	2	15.3	.377	.000	.680	2.5	2.5	1.5	.1	5.7
Tony Parker	8	8	26.4	.526	.579	1.000	2.5	3.1	.5	.0	15.9
Jonathon Simmons	15	4	20.4	.456	.351	.677	1.9	1.9	.6	.1	10.5

== Transactions ==
=== Trades ===
July 8, 2016	To San Antonio Spurs Draft rights to Olivier Hanlan	To Utah Jazz Boris Diaw; Cash considerations

=== Free agency ===
==== Re-signed ====
Player	Signed
Manu Ginóbili	1-year contract worth $14 million

==== Additions ====
Player	Signed	Former team
Pau Gasol	2-year contract worth $30 million	Chicago Bulls
Dewayne Dedmon	2-year contract worth $6 million	Orlando Magic
Dāvis Bertāns	2-year contract worth $1.5 million	(Spain) Saski Baskonia
Bryn Forbes	2-year contract worth $1.5 million	Michigan State Spartans
David Lee	2-year contract worth $3.2 million	Dallas Mavericks

==== Subtractions ====
Player	Reason left	New team
David West	1-year contract worth $1.5 million	Golden State Warriors
Tim Duncan	Retired	—N/a
Boban Marjanović	3-year contract worth $21 million	Detroit Pistons
