= Tarik Black =

American basketball player (born 1991)

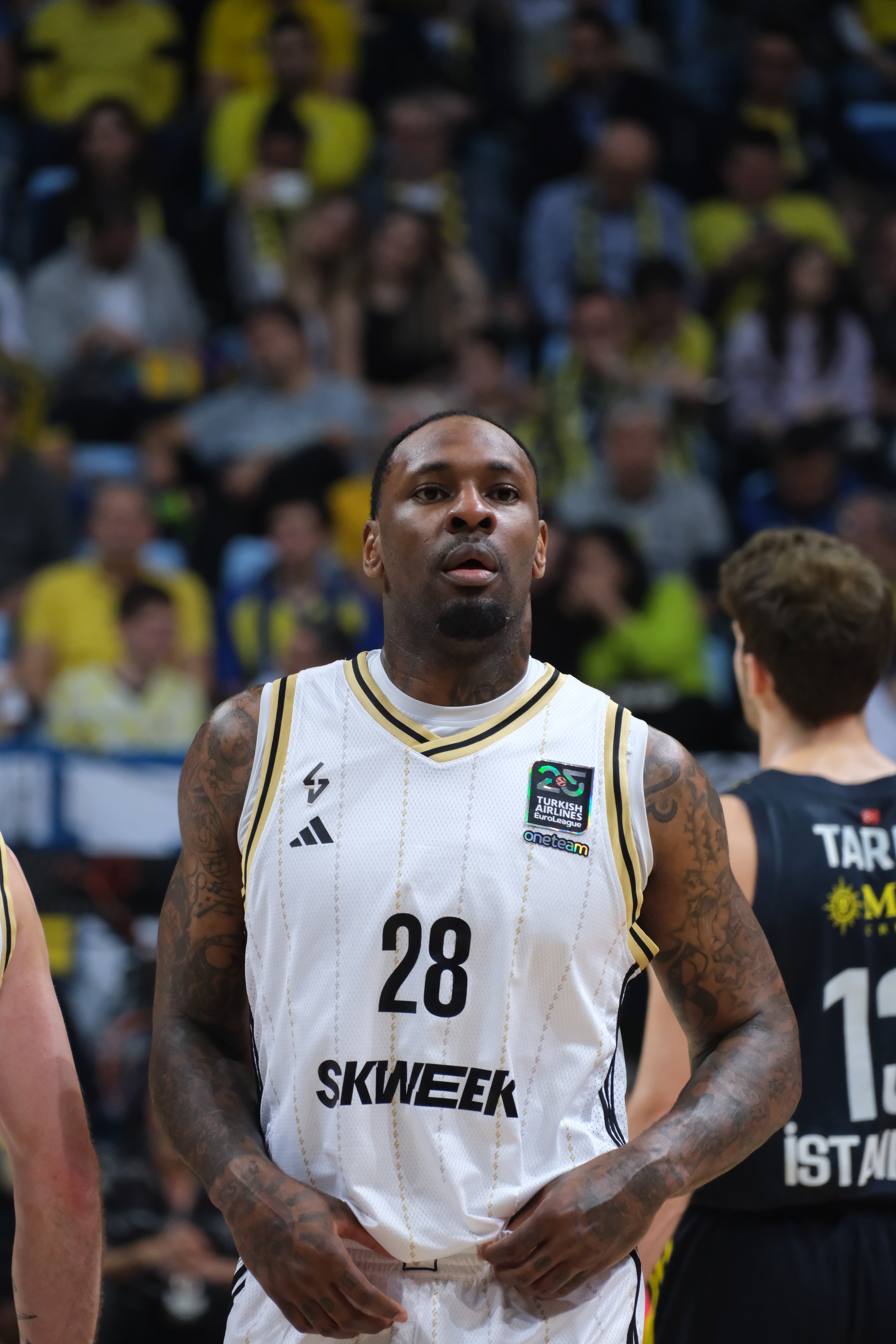
- Black with LDLC ASVEL in 2025

Personal information
- Born: November 22, 1991 (age 34) Memphis, Tennessee, U.S.
- Listed height: 6 ft 9 in (2.06 m)
- Listed weight: 260 lb (118 kg)

Career information
- High school: Ridgeway (Memphis, Tennessee)
- College: Memphis (2010–2013); Kansas (2013–2014)
- NBA draft: 2014: undrafted
- Playing career: 2014–2025
- Position: Center
- Number: 10, 28, 17, 9

Career history
- 2014: Houston Rockets
- 2014–2017: Los Angeles Lakers
- 2015–2016: →Los Angeles D-Fenders
- 2017–2018: Houston Rockets
- 2018–2020: Maccabi Tel Aviv
- 2021: Zenit Saint Petersburg
- 2021–2022: Grand Rapids Gold
- 2022: Bahçeşehir Koleji
- 2022–2023: Olympiacos
- 2024: Reggiana
- 2024–2025: LDLC ASVEL

Career highlights
- FIBA Europe Cup champion (2022); Greek League champion (2023); Greek Cup winner (2023); Greek Super Cup winner (2022); Israeli League champion (2019); All-Israeli League Second Team (2019); Israeli League All-Star (2019); C-USA All-Defensive Team (2012); Second-team All-C-USA (2012); C-USA All-Freshman Team (2011)
- Stats at NBA.com
- Stats at Basketball Reference

Tarik Bernard Black (/ˈtɑːrɪk/; born November 22, 1991) is an American former professional basketball player. He has previously played for the Los Angeles Lakers and the Houston Rockets in the National Basketball Association (NBA). Black played college basketball for the University of Memphis and the University of Kansas.

== High school career ==
Black attended Ridgeway High School in Memphis, Tennessee. As a junior in 2008–09, he averaged 15.7 points and 11.8 rebounds per game as he helped lead the Roadrunners to a 26–6 record and a District 15-AAA title. As a senior in 2009–10, he averaged 16.3 points and 12.6 rebounds as he helped lead the Roadrunners to a 26–3 record and a second District 15-AAA title.

== College career ==
=== Memphis (2010–2013) ===
In his freshman season at Memphis, Black played in all 35 games and made 24 starts, including 18 of the final 19 contests, while averaging 9.1 points and 5.0 rebounds per game. He was subsequently named to the Conference USA All-Freshman team.

In his sophomore season, Black played in all 35 games and made 31 starts, while averaging 10.7 points, 4.9 rebounds, and 1.5 blocks per game. He also set the Memphis single-season field goal percentage record at 68.9 percent and was named to the All-Conference USA second team, All-Defensive team and All-Tournament team.

Black played in 32 games and made five starts his junior season, averaging 8.1 points and 4.8 rebounds in 20.8 minutes per game. He was named to the Tiger Academic 30 for the 2013 spring semester for having the highest grade-point average on the team.

=== Kansas (2013–2014) ===
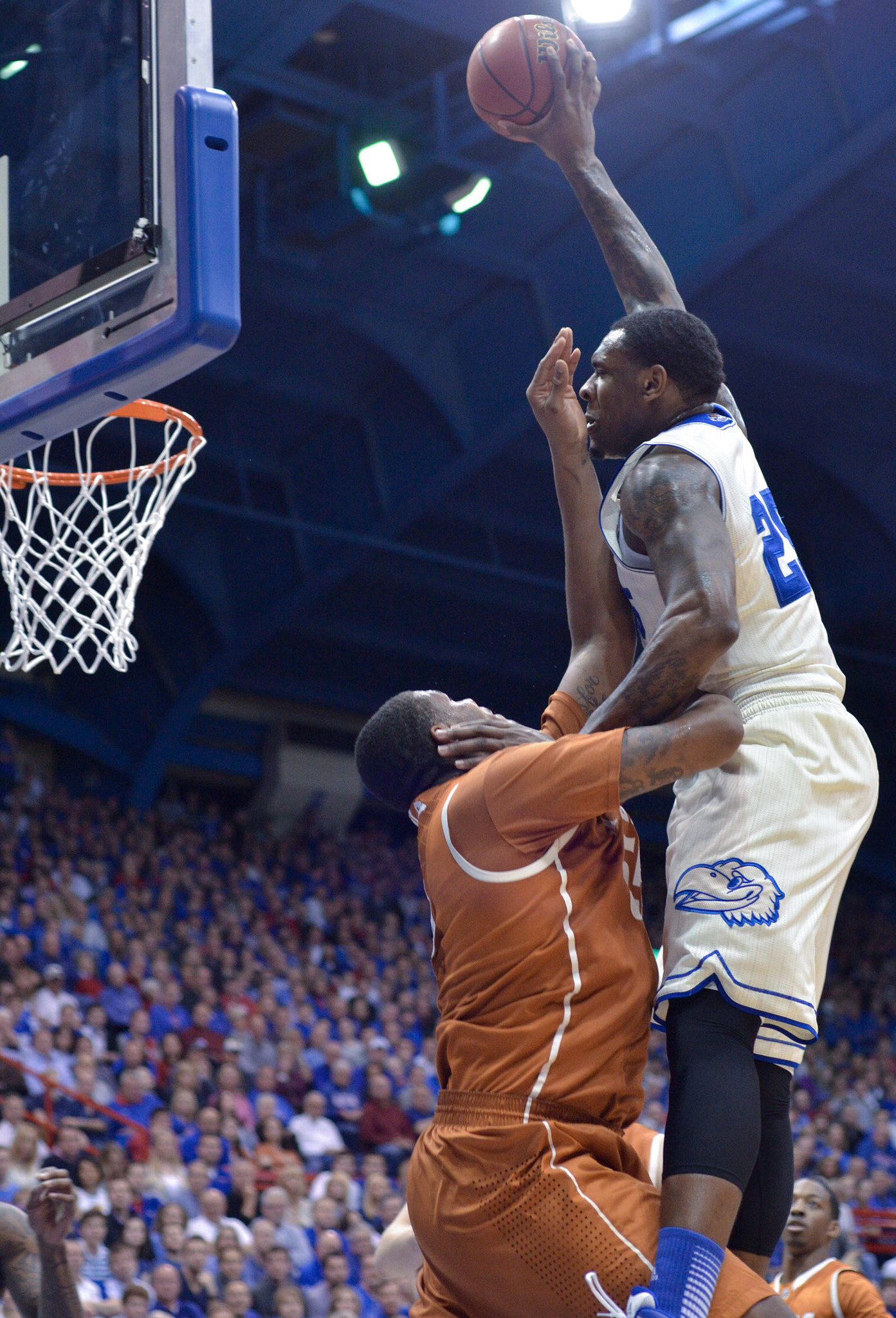
Black dunking in 2014

On May 20, 2013, Black transferred to the University of Kansas after graduating from Memphis with a degree in organizational leadership, and was deemed eligible to play immediately. In his lone season for the Jayhawks, he was named the Big 12 Preseason Newcomer of the Year and went on to average 15.0 points per game in the NCAA tournament. His season-high 19 points on 9-of-9 shooting on Senior Night was the best efficiency by a Jayhawk since 1990. In 33 games (15 starts), he averaged 5.5 points and 3.9 rebounds in 13.5 minutes per game.

== Professional career ==
=== Houston Rockets (2014) ===
After going undrafted in the 2014 NBA draft, Black joined the Houston Rockets for the 2014 NBA Summer League. On August 27, 2014, he signed with the Rockets. On December 26, 2014, he was waived by the Rockets after appearing in 25 games.

=== Los Angeles Lakers (2014–2017) ===
On December 28, 2014, Black was claimed off waivers by the Los Angeles Lakers. On January 3, 2015, he was assigned to the Los Angeles D-Fenders of the NBA Development League. He was recalled the next day. On April 10, 2015, he recorded a season-best game with 18 points and 10 rebounds in a 106–98 win over the Minnesota Timberwolves.

During the 2015–16 season, Black received multiple assignments to the Los Angeles D-Fenders.

On August 24, 2016, Black re-signed with the Lakers. On July 1, 2017, he was waived by the Lakers.

=== Return to Houston (2017–2018) ===
On July 17, 2017, Black signed with the Houston Rockets, returning to the franchise for a second stint.

=== Maccabi Tel Aviv (2018–2020) ===
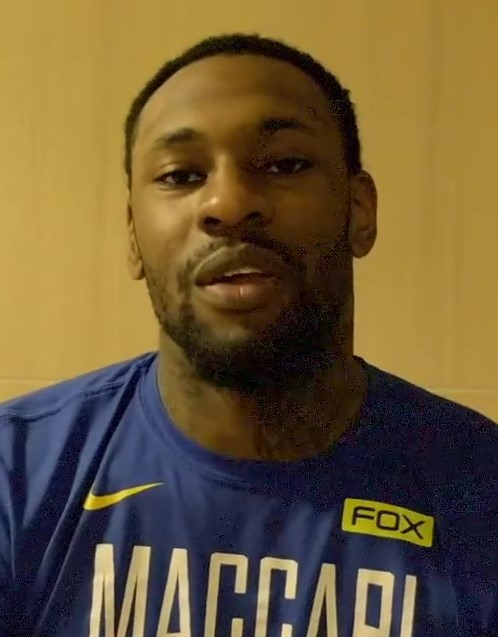
Black with Maccabi Tel Aviv in 2020

On August 20, 2018, Black signed a one-year deal with the Israeli team Maccabi Tel Aviv of the EuroLeague. On April 5, 2019, Black recorded a career-high 23 points, shooting 10-for-12 from the field, along with seven rebounds in a 78–75 loss to Fenerbahçe. On April 12, 2019, Black participated in the 2019 Israeli League All-Star Game, scoring 15 points and five rebounds off the bench. Black won the Israeli League championship title with Maccabi, earning a spot in the All-Israeli League Second Team.

On June 18, 2019, Black signed a two-year contract extension with Maccabi (with an NBA buy-out option until July 30). He parted ways with the team on May 23, 2020.

=== Zenit Saint Petersburg (2021) ===
On January 14, 2021, Black signed with Zenit Saint Petersburg of the VTB United League and the EuroLeague. On July 20, 2021, Black parted ways with the Russian club.

=== Grand Rapids Gold (2021–2022) ===
On September 27, 2021, Black signed with the Denver Nuggets. Black subsequently joined the Grand Rapids Gold as an affiliate player. In 15 games, he averaged 11.5 points, 7.9 rebounds, 2.1 assists and 1.3 blocks per game.

=== Bahçeşehir Koleji (2022) ===
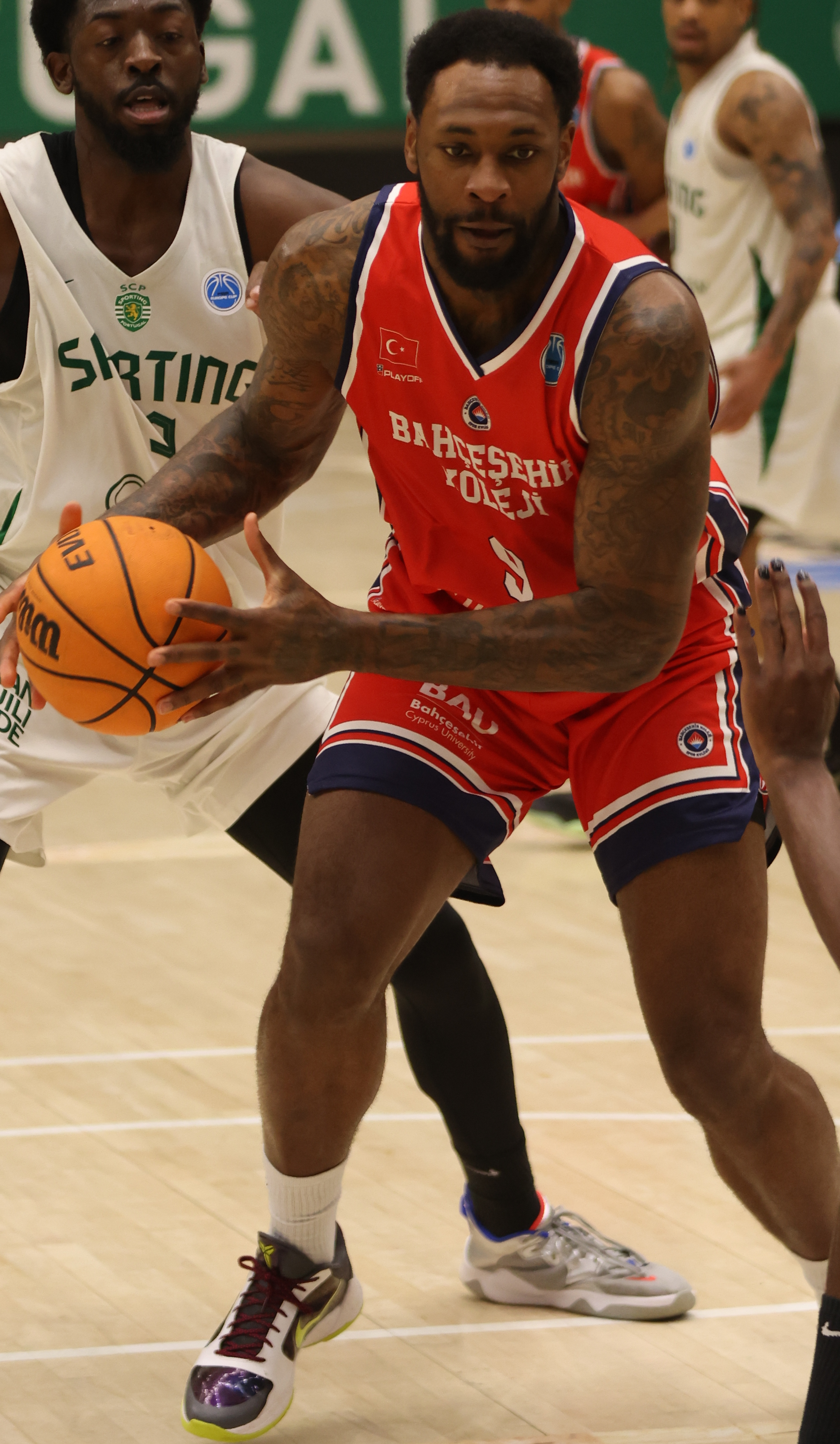
Black with Bahçeşehir Koleji in 2022

On February 27, 2022, Black signed with Bahçeşehir Koleji of the Turkish Basketball Super League (BSL).

=== Olympiacos (2022–2023) ===
On July 31, 2022, Black signed a one-year deal with Olympiacos of the Greek Basket League and the EuroLeague. In 35 EuroLeague matches, he averaged 4.4 points and 1.7 rebounds, playing around 10 minutes per contest. Additionally, in 19 domestic games, he averaged 8.8 points and 4 rebounds, playing around 16 minutes per contest. On July 5, 2023, he was released from the club.

=== Pallacanestro Reggiana (2024) ===
On February 12, 2024, Black signed with Pallacanestro Reggiana of the Lega Basket Serie A (LBA).

=== LDLC ASVEL (2024–2025) ===
On July 11, 2024, Black signed with LDLC ASVEL of the LNB Élite and EuroLeague.

== Career statistics ==
Legend
GP	Games played	GS	Games started	MPG	Minutes per game
FG%	Field goal percentage	3P%	3-point field goal percentage	FT%	Free throw percentage
RPG	Rebounds per game	APG	Assists per game	SPG	Steals per game
BPG	Blocks per game	PPG	Points per game	**Bold**	Career high

=== NBA ===
==== Regular season ====
Year	Team	GP	GS	MPG	FG%	3P%	FT%	RPG	APG	SPG	BPG	PPG
2014–15	Houston	25	12	15.7	.542	.000	.517	5.1	.3	.2	.1	4.2
2014–15	L.A. Lakers	38	**27**	**21.1**	.589	–	.562	**6.3**	**.9**	.3	.6	**7.2**
2015–16	L.A. Lakers	39	0	12.7	.548	–	.422	4.0	.4	**.4**	.5	3.4
2016–17	L.A. Lakers	**67**	16	16.3	.510	**.500**	**.752**	5.1	.6	**.4**	**.7**	5.7
2017–18	Houston	51	2	10.5	**.591**	.091	.460	3.2	.3	**.4**	.6	3.5
Career		220	57	15.1	.550	.143	.582	4.7	.5	.4	.5	4.9

==== Playoffs ====
Year	Team	GP	GS	MPG	FG%	3P%	FT%	RPG	APG	SPG	BPG	PPG
2018	Houston	7	0	2.7	.250	–	–	.9	.3	.0	.1	.3
Career		7	0	2.7	.250	–	–	.9	.3	.0	.1	.3

=== EuroLeague ===
Year	Team	GP	GS	MPG	FG%	3P%	FT%	RPG	APG	SPG	BPG	PPG	PIR
2018–19	Maccabi	26	**24**	**21.5**	**.694**	.000	.684	**5.4**	.7	.5	**.8**	**11.0**	**13.8**
2019–20	Maccabi	11	11	19.6	.618	—	.696	4.8	**1.0**	**.8**	.7	9.1	10.6
2020–21	Zenit	13	7	14.7	.542	.000	**.750**	3.5	.4	.7	.6	5.2	4.8
2022–23	Olympiacos	**35**	1	10.3	.630	—	.675	1.7	.5	.6	.3	4.4	4.9
Career		85	43	15.6	.647	.000	.689	3.5	.6	.6	.6	7.1	8.3

== Personal life ==
Black is the son of Lawrence and Judith Black, and has two brothers, Bilal and Amal.

Black earned his bachelor's degree from the University of Memphis and his master's degree from the University of Kansas.
