= 2016–17 Milwaukee Bucks season =

NBA professional basketball team season

- Head coach: Jason Kidd
- Owners: Wesley Edens & Marc Lasry
- Arena: Bradley Center

Results
- Record: 42–40 (.512)
- Place: Division: 2nd (Central); Conference: 6th (Eastern)
- Playoff finish: First Round (lost to Raptors 2–4)
- Stats at Basketball Reference

Local media
- Television: Fox Sports Wisconsin
- Radio: WTMJ (AM)

The 2016–17 Milwaukee Bucks season was the 49th season of the franchise in the National Basketball Association (NBA). For the first time since 2010, the Bucks had a winning record in the regular season finished at 42–40.

The Bucks finished the regular season with a 42–40 record, securing the 6th seed. In the playoffs, they faced off against the 3rd seeded Toronto Raptors, where they lost in six games. It was also the last season with John Hammond as general manager. He would leave his spot to become the general manager of the Orlando Magic on May 23, 2017, and later he was replaced by Jon Horst.

== Draft picks ==
| Round | Pick | Player | Position(s) | Nationality | School |
|---|---|---|---|---|---|
| 1 | 10 | Thon Maker | PF/C | Australia | (Canada) Orangeville Prep |
| 2 | 36 | Malcolm Brogdon | PG/SG | United States | Virginia |

== Roster ==
2016–17 Milwaukee Bucks roster
Players

| Pos. | No. | Player | Height | Weight | DOB | From |
|---|---|---|---|---|---|---|
| PF | 34 | Giannis Antetokounmpo | 6 ft 11 in (2.11 m) | 242 lb (110 kg) | 1994–12–06 | Greece |
| SF | 9 | Michael Beasley | 6 ft 10 in (2.08 m) | 235 lb (107 kg) | 1989–01–09 | Kansas State |
| SG | 13 | Malcolm Brogdon | 6 ft 5 in (1.96 m) | 215 lb (98 kg) | 1992–12–11 | Virginia |
| PG | 8 | Matthew Dellavedova | 6 ft 4 in (1.93 m) | 210 lb (95 kg) | 1990–09–08 | Saint Mary's |
| C | 00 | Spencer Hawes | 7 ft 1 in (2.16 m) | 245 lb (111 kg) | 1988–04–28 | Washington |
| PF | 31 | John Henson | 6 ft 11 in (2.11 m) | 229 lb (104 kg) | 1990–12–28 | North Carolina |
| C | 7 | Thon Maker | 7 ft 1 in (2.16 m) | 243 lb (110 kg) | 1997–02–25 | Orangeville Prep (CAN) |
| SF | 22 | Khris Middleton | 6 ft 8 in (2.03 m) | 234 lb (106 kg) | 1991–08–12 | Texas A&M |
| C | 15 | Greg Monroe | 6 ft 11 in (2.11 m) | 265 lb (120 kg) | 1990–06–04 | Georgetown |
| SF | 12 | Jabari Parker (injured) | 6 ft 8 in (2.03 m) | 250 lb (113 kg) | 1995–03–15 | Duke |
| PG | 0 | Gary Payton II | 6 ft 3 in (1.91 m) | 190 lb (86 kg) | 1992–12–01 | Oregon State |
| SG | 21 | Tony Snell | 6 ft 7 in (2.01 m) | 223 lb (101 kg) | 1991–11–10 | New Mexico |
| PF | 35 | Mirza Teletović | 6 ft 9 in (2.06 m) | 245 lb (111 kg) | 1985–09–17 | Bosnia and Herzegovina |
| PG | 3 | Jason Terry | 6 ft 2 in (1.88 m) | 185 lb (84 kg) | 1977–09–15 | Arizona |
| SG | 20 | Rashad Vaughn | 6 ft 6 in (1.98 m) | 202 lb (92 kg) | 1996–08–16 | UNLV |

Coaches
Head coach
- Jason Kidd
Assistant(s)
- Stacey Augmon
- Greg Foster
- Eric Hughes
- Joe Prunty
- Sean Sweeney

Legend
- (DP) Unsigned draft pick
- (FA) Free agent
- (S) Suspended
- (DL) On assignment to D-League affiliate
- Injured

Roster
Updated: 2017–03–04

== Preseason ==
=== Game log ===
2016 pre-season game log
Total: 3–3 (home: 2–1; road: 1–2)
Pre-season: 3–3 (home: 2–1; road: 1–2)

| Game | Date | Team | Score | High points | High rebounds | High assists | Location Attendance | Record |
|---|---|---|---|---|---|---|---|---|
| 1 | October 3 | @ Bulls | W 93–91 | Greg Monroe (15) | Michael Carter-Williams (11) | Matthew Dellavedova (6) | United Center; 20,104 | 1–0 |
| 2 | October 8 | Mavericks | W 88–74 | Jabari Parker (21) | Michael Beasley (9) | Malcolm Brogdon (6) | Kohl Center; 10,560 | 2–0 |
| 3 | October 12 | @ Pacers | L 83–101 | Giannis Antetokounmpo (20) | John Henson (8) | Giannis Antetokounmpo (6) | Bankers Life Fieldhouse; 6,447 | 2–1 |
| 4 | October 15 | Bulls | L 86–107 | Jabari Parker (21) | Antetokounmpo, Beasley, Parker (6) | Matthew Dellavedova (8) | BMO Harris Bradley Center; 10,794 | 2–2 |
| 5 | October 17 | @ Pistons | L 78–102 | Giannis Antetokounmpo (21) | Greg Monroe (8) | Antetokounmpo, Dellavedova (4) | The Palace of Auburn Hills; 10,096 | 2–3 |
| 6 | October 19 | Pacers | W 111–103 | Giannis Antetokounmpo (20) | Jabari Parker (10) | Matthew Dellavedova (7) | BMO Harris Bradley Center; 5,450 | 3–3 |

2016–17 season schedule

== Standings ==
=== Division ===
| Central Division | W | L | PCT | GB | Home | Road | Div | GP |
|---|---|---|---|---|---|---|---|---|
| y – Cleveland Cavaliers | 51 | 31 | .622 | – | 31‍–‍10 | 20‍–‍21 | 8–8 | 82 |
| x – Milwaukee Bucks | 42 | 40 | .512 | 9.0 | 23‍–‍18 | 19‍–‍22 | 10–6 | 82 |
| x – Indiana Pacers | 42 | 40 | .512 | 9.0 | 29‍–‍12 | 13‍–‍28 | 8–8 | 82 |
| x – Chicago Bulls | 41 | 41 | .500 | 10.0 | 25‍–‍16 | 16‍–‍25 | 9–7 | 82 |
| Detroit Pistons | 37 | 45 | .451 | 14.0 | 24‍–‍17 | 13‍–‍28 | 5–11 | 82 |

=== Conference ===
Eastern Conference
| # | Team | W | L | PCT | GB | GP |
|---|---|---|---|---|---|---|
| 1 | c – Boston Celtics * | 53 | 29 | .646 | – | 82 |
| 2 | y – Cleveland Cavaliers * | 51 | 31 | .622 | 2.0 | 82 |
| 3 | x – Toronto Raptors | 51 | 31 | .622 | 2.0 | 82 |
| 4 | y – Washington Wizards * | 49 | 33 | .598 | 4.0 | 82 |
| 5 | x – Atlanta Hawks | 43 | 39 | .524 | 10.0 | 82 |
| 6 | x – Milwaukee Bucks | 42 | 40 | .512 | 11.0 | 82 |
| 7 | x – Indiana Pacers | 42 | 40 | .512 | 11.0 | 82 |
| 8 | x – Chicago Bulls | 41 | 41 | .500 | 12.0 | 82 |
| 9 | Miami Heat | 41 | 41 | .500 | 12.0 | 82 |
| 10 | Detroit Pistons | 37 | 45 | .451 | 16.0 | 82 |
| 11 | Charlotte Hornets | 36 | 46 | .439 | 17.0 | 82 |
| 12 | New York Knicks | 31 | 51 | .378 | 22.0 | 82 |
| 13 | Orlando Magic | 29 | 53 | .354 | 24.0 | 82 |
| 14 | Philadelphia 76ers | 28 | 54 | .341 | 25.0 | 82 |
| 15 | Brooklyn Nets | 20 | 62 | .244 | 33.0 | 82 |

== Game log ==
=== Regular season ===
2016–17 game log
Total: 42–40 (home: 23–18; road: 19–22)
October: 1–2 (home: 1–1; road: 0–1)

| Game | Date | Team | Score | High points | High rebounds | High assists | Location Attendance | Record |
|---|---|---|---|---|---|---|---|---|
| 1 | October 26 | Charlotte | L 96–107 | Giannis Antetokounmpo (31) | Greg Monroe (10) | Giannis Antetokounmpo (5) | BMO Harris Bradley Center; 18,717 | 0–1 |
| 2 | October 29 | Brooklyn | W 110–108 | Rashad Vaughn (22) | John Henson (12) | Matthew Dellavedova (9) | BMO Harris Bradley Center; 12,570 | 1–1 |
| 3 | October 30 | @ Detroit | L 83–98 | Giannis Antetokounmpo (17) | Giannis Antetokounmpo (8) | Giannis Antetokounmpo (8) | The Palace of Auburn Hills; 15,161 | 1–2 |

November : 7–6 (home: 5–3; road: 2–3)

| Game | Date | Team | Score | High points | High rebounds | High assists | Location Attendance | Record |
|---|---|---|---|---|---|---|---|---|
| 4 | November 1 | @ New Orleans | W 117–113 | Giannis Antetokounmpo (24) | Antetokounmpo, Snell (10) | Giannis Antetokounmpo (7) | Smoothie King Center; 18,217 | 2–2 |
| 5 | November 3 | Indiana | W 125–109 | Antetokounmpo, Parker (22) | Greg Monroe (16) | Giannis Antetokounmpo (9) | BMO Harris Bradley Center; 11,374 | 3–2 |
| 6 | November 5 | Sacramento | W 117–91 | Mirza Teletovic (22) | Giannis Antetokounmpo (8) | Giannis Antetokounmpo (8) | BMO Harris Bradley Center; 16,021 | 4–2 |
| 7 | November 6 | @ Dallas | L 75–86 (OT) | Jabari Parker (16) | Greg Monroe (12) | Matthew Dellavedova (6) | American Airlines Center; 19,345 | 4–3 |
| 8 | November 10 | New Orleans | L 106–112 | Jabari Parker (33) | Giannis Antetokounmpo (9) | Matthew Dellavedova (12) | BMO Harris Bradley Center; 12,159 | 4−4 |
| 9 | November 12 | Memphis | W 106–96 | Giannis Antetokounmpo (27) | Monroe, Henson (7) | Giannis Antetokounmpo (5) | BMO Harris Bradley Center; 14,327 | 5−4 |
| 10 | November 16 | @ Atlanta | L 100–107 | Giannis Antetokounmpo (26) | Giannis Antetokounmpo (15) | Antetokounmpo, Dellavedova (7) | Philips Arena; 14,656 | 5–5 |
| 11 | November 17 | @ Miami | L 73–96 | Antetokounmpo, Snell (14) | Michael Beasley (10) | Matthew Dellavedova (9) | American Airlines Arena; 19,600 | 5–6 |
| 12 | November 19 | Golden State | L 121–124 | Giannis Antetokounmpo (30) | Snell, Henson (7) | Giannis Antetokounmpo (6) | BMO Harris Bradley Center; 14,327 | 5−7 |
| 13 | November 21 | Orlando | W 93–89 | Giannis Antetokounmpo (25) | Giannis Antetokounmpo (10) | Giannis Antetokounmpo (10) | BMO Harris Bradley Center; 12,306 | 6–7 |
| 14 | November 25 | Toronto | L 99–105 | Giannis Antetokounmpo (29) | Greg Monroe (11) | Giannis Antetokounmpo (11) | BMO Harris Bradley Center; 16,223 | 6–8 |
| 15 | November 27 | @ Orlando | W 104–96 | John Henson (20) | Giannis Antetokounmpo (9) | Matthew Dellavedova (8) | Amway Center; 16,521 | 7–8 |
| 16 | November 29 | Cleveland | W 118–101 | Giannis Antetokounmpo (34) | Giannis Antetokounmpo (12) | Matthew Dellavedova (8) | BMO Harris Bradley Center; 16,559 | 8–8 |

December : 8–8 (home: 4–3; road: 4–5)

| Game | Date | Team | Score | High points | High rebounds | High assists | Location Attendance | Record |
|---|---|---|---|---|---|---|---|---|
| 17 | December 1 | @ Brooklyn | W 111–93 | Giannis Antetokounmpo (23) | Antetokounmpo, Henson (8) | Giannis Antetokounmpo (8) | Barclays Center; 12,675 | 9–8 |
| 18 | December 3 | Brooklyn | W 112–103 | John Henson (20) | Giannis Antetokounmpo (10) | Antetokounmpo, Dellavedova (6) | BMO Harris Bradley Center; 15,565 | 10–8 |
| 19 | December 5 | San Antonio | L 96–97 | Jabari Parker (23) | Greg Monroe (13) | Malcolm Brogdon (5) | BMO Harris Bradley Center; 14,256 | 10–9 |
| 20 | December 7 | Portland | W 115–107 | Jabari Parker (27) | Giannis Antetokounmpo (12) | Giannis Antetokounmpo (11) | BMO Harris Bradley Center; 14,033 | 11–9 |
| 21 | December 9 | Atlanta | L 110–114 | Jabari Parker (27) | Antetokounmpo, Henson, Monroe, Beasley (6) | Greg Monroe (5) | BMO Harris Bradley Center; 16,289 | 11–10 |
| 22 | December 10 | @ Washington | L 105–110 | Giannis Antetokounmpo (28) | Giannis Antetokounmpo (13) | Giannis Antetokounmpo (7) | Verizon Center; 14,816 | 11–11 |
| 23 | December 12 | @ Toronto | L 100–122 | Giannis Antetokounmpo (30) | Antetokounmpo, Teletovic (8) | Matthew Dellavedova (10) | Air Canada Centre; 19,800 | 11–12 |
| 24 | December 15 | Chicago | W 108–97 | Giannis Antetokounmpo (30) | Giannis Antetokounmpo (14) | Matthew Dellavedova (9) | Bradley Center; 16,704 | 12–12 |
| 25 | December 16 | @ Chicago | W 95–69 | Giannis Antetokounmpo (22) | Greg Monroe (12) | Giannis Antetokounmpo (11) | United Center; 21,324 | 13–12 |
| 26 | December 20 | Cleveland | L 108–114 (OT) | Jabari Parker (30) | Giannis Antetokounmpo (13) | Brogdon, Dellavedova (5) | BMO Harris Bradley Center; 17,053 | 13–13 |
| 27 | December 21 | @ Cleveland | L 102–113 | Giannis Antetokounmpo (28) | John Henson (8) | Malcolm Brogdon (7) | Quicken Loans Arena; 20,562 | 13–14 |
| 28 | December 23 | Washington | W 123–96 | Giannis Antetokounmpo (39) | Greg Monroe (11) | Malcolm Brogdon (7) | BMO Harris Bradley Center; 15,921 | 14–14 |
| 29 | December 26 | @ Washington | L 102–107 | Giannis Antetokounmpo (22) | Giannis Antetokounmpo (12) | Matthew Dellavedova (11) | Verizon Center; 15,773 | 14–15 |
| 30 | December 28 | @ Detroit | W 119–94 | Jabari Parker (31) | Jabari Parker (9) | Brogdon, Antetokounmpo (8) | Palace of Auburn Hills; 17,222 | 15–15 |
| 31 | December 30 | @ Minnesota | L 99–116 | Giannis Antetokounmpo (25) | Giannis Antetokounmpo (7) | Giannis Antetokounmpo (5) | Target Center; 17,779 | 15–16 |
| 32 | December 31 | @ Chicago | W 116–96 | Giannis Antetokounmpo (35) | Malcolm Brogdon (11) | Malcolm Brogdon (12) | United Center; 21,838 | 16–16 |

January : 5–10 (home: 3–5; road: 2–5)

| Game | Date | Team | Score | High points | High rebounds | High assists | Location Attendance | Record |
|---|---|---|---|---|---|---|---|---|
| 33 | January 2 | Oklahoma City | W 98–94 | Giannis Antetokounmpo (26) | Giannis Antetokounmpo (10) | Antetokounmpo, Brogdon (5) | BMO Harris Bradley Center; 17,423 | 17–16 |
| 34 | January 4 | @ New York | W 105–104 | Giannis Antetokounmpo (27) | Giannis Antetokounmpo (13) | Malcolm Brogdon (8) | Madison Square Garden; 19,812 | 18–16 |
| 35 | January 6 | New York | L 111–116 | Antetokounmpo, Parker (25) | Greg Monroe (7) | Antetokounmpo, Brogdon, Terry (5) | BMO Harris Bradley Center; 18,717 | 18–17 |
| 36 | January 8 | Washington | L 101–107 | Jabari Parker (28) | Greg Monroe (12) | Jabari Parker (7) | BMO Harris Bradley Center; 15,311 | 18–18 |
| 37 | January 10 | @ San Antonio | W 109–107 | Michael Beasley (28) | Greg Monroe (9) | Malcolm Brogdon (6) | AT&T Center; 18,418 | 19–18 |
| 38 | January 13 | Miami | W 116–108 | Jabari Parker (24) | Greg Monroe (11) | Matthew Dellavedova (11) | BMO Harris Bradley Center; 17,483 | 20–18 |
| 39 | January 15 | @ Atlanta | L 98–111 | Giannis Antetokounmpo (33) | Jabari Parker (10) | Jabari Parker (9) | Philips Arena; 14,231 | 20–19 |
| 40 | January 16 | Philadelphia | L 104–113 | Antetokounmpo, Parker (23) | Antetokounmpo, Beasley, Monroe (6) | Malcolm Brogdon (6) | BMO Harris Bradley Center; 13,261 | 20–20 |
| 41 | January 18 | @ Houston | L 92–111 | Giannis Antetokounmpo (32) | Giannis Antetokounmpo (11) | Malcolm Brogdon (8) | Toyota Center; 15,782 | 20–21 |
| 42 | January 20 | @ Orlando | L 96–112 | Jabari Parker (25) | Giannis Antetokounmpo (14) | Jabari Parker (6) | Amway Center; 19,307 | 20–22 |
| 43 | January 21 | @ Miami | L 97–109 | Giannis Antetokounmpo (24) | Giannis Antetokounmpo (10) | Matthew Dellavedova (7) | American Airlines Arena; 19,600 | 20–23 |
| 44 | January 23 | Houston | W 127–114 | Giannis Antetokounmpo (31) | Greg Monroe (10) | Dellavedova, Parker (7) | BMO Harris Bradley Center; 14,016 | 21–23 |
| 45 | January 25 | Philadelphia | L 109–114 | Greg Monroe (28) | Giannis Antetokounmpo (12) | Malcolm Brogdon (7) | Bradley Center; 13,663 | 21–24 |
| 46 | January 27 | @ Toronto | L 86–102 | Jabari Parker (21) | Jabari Parker (13) | Giannis Antetokounmpo (8) | Air Canada Centre; 19,800 | 21–25 |
| 47 | January 28 | Boston | L 108–112 (OT) | Giannis Antetokounmpo (21) | Greg Monroe (13) | Antetokounmpo, Dellavedova (6) | Bradley Center; 18,717 | 21–26 |

February : 5–6 (home: 2–3; road: 3–3)

| Game | Date | Team | Score | High points | High rebounds | High assists | Location Attendance | Record |
|---|---|---|---|---|---|---|---|---|
| 48 | February 1 | @ Utah | L 88–104 | Jabari Parker (17) | Tony Snell (7) | Snell, Parker (7) | Vivint Smart Home Arena; 19,694 | 21–27 |
| 49 | February 3 | @ Denver | L 117–121 | Jabari Parker (27) | Jabari Parker (11) | Matthew Dellavedova (12) | Pepsi Center; 18,792 | 21–28 |
| 50 | February 4 | @ Phoenix | W 137–112 | Giannis Antetokounmpo (30) | Giannis Antetokounmpo (12) | Malcolm Brogdon (8) | Talking Stick Resort Arena; 17,192 | 22–28 |
| 51 | February 8 | Miami | L 88–106 | Giannis Antetokounmpo (22) | Giannis Antetokounmpo (8) | Malcolm Brogdon (6) | Bradley Center; 14,211 | 22–29 |
| 52 | February 10 | L. A. Lakers | L 114–122 | Giannis Antetokounmpo (41) | Giannis Antetokounmpo (8) | Middleton, Antetokounmpo (6) | Bradley Center; 16,380 | 22–30 |
| 53 | February 11 | @ Indiana | W 116–100 | Giannis Antetokounmpo (20) | Monroe, Antetokounmpo (8) | Giannis Antetokounmpo (10) | Bankers Life Fieldhouse; 17,923 | 23–30 |
| 54 | February 13 | Detroit | W 102–89 | Greg Monroe (25) | Greg Monroe (13) | Giannis Antetokounmpo (6) | Bradley Center; 13.397 | 24–30 |
| 55 | February 15 | @ Brooklyn | W 129–125 | Giannis Antetokounmpo (33) | Giannis Antetokounmpo (9) | Khris Middleton (7) | Barclays Center; 16,182 | 25–30 |
| 56 | February 24 | Utah | L 95–109 | Giannis Antetokounmpo (33) | Giannis Antetokounmpo (12) | Matthew Dellavedova (6) | Bradley Center; 16,064 | 25–31 |
| 57 | February 26 | Phoenix | W 100–96 | Giannis Antetokounmpo (28) | Antetokounmpo, Monroe (8) | Malcolm Brogdon (7) | BMO Harris Bradley Center; 16,051 | 26–31 |
| 58 | February 27 | @ Cleveland | L 95–102 | Malcolm Brogdon (20) | Giannis Antetokounmpo (7) | Giannis Antetokounmpo (8) | Quicken Loans Arena; 20,562 | 26–32 |

March : 14–4 (home: 6–2; road: 8–2)

| Game | Date | Team | Score | High points | High rebounds | High assists | Location Attendance | Record |
|---|---|---|---|---|---|---|---|---|
| 59 | March 1 | Denver | L 98–110 | Khris Middleton (21) | Antetokounmpo, Monroe (9) | Khris Middleton (5) | BMO Harris Bradley Center; 13,214 | 26–33 |
| 60 | March 3 | L. A. Clippers | W 112–101 | Giannis Antetokounmpo (24) | Antetokounmpo, Monroe (5) | Khris Middleton (9) | BMO Harris Bradley Center; 16,208 | 27–33 |
| 61 | March 4 | Toronto | W 101–94 | Khris Middleton (24) | Giannis Antetokounmpo (10) | Giannis Antetokounmpo (4) | BMO Harris Bradley Center; 16,775 | 28–33 |
| 62 | March 6 | @ Philadelphia | W 112–98 | Giannis Antetokounmpo (24) | Giannis Antetokounmpo (8) | Khris Middleton (8) | Wells Fargo Center; 18,351 | 29–33 |
| 63 | March 8 | New York | W 104–93 | Giannis Antetokounmpo (32) | Giannis Antetokounmpo (13) | Giannis Antetokounmpo (7) | Bradley Center; 13,767 | 30–33 |
| 64 | March 10 | Indiana | W 99–85 | Antetokounmpo, Middleton (21) | Giannis Antetokounmpo (8) | Giannis Antetokounmpo (5) | Bradley Center; 16,177 | 31–33 |
| 65 | March 11 | Minnesota | W 102–95 | Tony Snell (19) | Khris Middleton (8) | Giannis Antetokounmpo (7) | Bradley Center; 18,717 | 32–33 |
| 66 | March 13 | @ Memphis | L 93–113 | Giannis Antetokounmpo (18) | Antetokounmpo, Henson, Monroe (5) | Giannis Antetokounmpo (4) | FedExForum; 16,770 | 32–34 |
| 67 | March 15 | @ L. A. Clippers | W 97–96 | Antetokounmpo, Middleton (16) | Henson, Middleton (7) | Antetokounmpo, Middleton (5) | Staples Center; 19,060 | 33–34 |
| 68 | March 17 | @ L. A. Lakers | W 107–103 | Giannis Antetokounmpo (26) | John Henson (9) | Antetokounmpo, Dellavedova (5) | Staples Center; 18,997 | 34–34 |
| 69 | March 18 | @ Golden State | L 92–117 | Malcolm Brogdon (18) | Greg Monroe (7) | Khris Middleton (5) | Oracle Arena; 19,596 | 34–35 |
| 70 | March 21 | @ Portland | W 93–90 | Khris Middleton (26) | Greg Monroe (9) | Malcolm Brogdon (4) | Moda Center; 19,525 | 35–35 |
| 71 | March 22 | @ Sacramento | W 116–98 | Giannis Antetokounmpo (32) | Giannis Antetokounmpo (13) | Giannis Antetokounmpo (6) | Golden 1 Center; 17,608 | 36–35 |
| 72 | March 24 | Atlanta | W 100–97 | Giannis Antetokounmpo (34) | Giannis Antetokounmpo (13) | Malcolm Brogdon (7) | Bradley Center; 16,786 | 37–35 |
| 73 | March 26 | Chicago | L 94–109 | Giannis Antetokounmpo (22) | Giannis Antetokounmpo (8) | Antetokounmpo, Brogdon, Dellavedova (4) | Bradley Center; 17,669 | 37–36 |
| 74 | March 28 | @ Charlotte | W 118–108 | Tony Snell (26) | Antetokounmpo, Monroe (8) | Malcolm Brogdon (10) | Spectrum Center; 16,505 | 38–36 |
| 75 | March 29 | @ Boston | W 103–100 | Giannis Antetokounmpo (22) | Giannis Antetokounmpo (9) | Malcolm Brogdon (9) | TD Garden; 18,624 | 39–36 |
| 76 | March 31 | Detroit | W 108–105 (OT) | Giannis Antetokounmpo (28) | Giannis Antetokounmpo (13) | Giannis Antetokounmpo (9) | Bradley Center; 18,717 | 40–36 |

April : 2–4 (home: 1–1; road: 1–3)

| Game | Date | Team | Score | High points | High rebounds | High assists | Location Attendance | Record |
|---|---|---|---|---|---|---|---|---|
| 77 | April 2 | Dallas | L 105–109 | Giannis Antetokounmpo (31) | Giannis Antetokounmpo (15) | Giannis Antetokounmpo (9) | Bradley Center; 18,717 | 40–37 |
| 78 | April 4 | @ Oklahoma City | L 79–110 | Michael Beasley (14) | Giannis Antetokounmpo (10) | Giannis Antetokounmpo (4) | Chesapeake Energy Arena; 18,203 | 40–38 |
| 79 | April 6 | @ Indiana | L 89–104 | Giannis Antetokounmpo (25) | Giannis Antetokounmpo (7) | Giannis Antetokounmpo (6) | Bankers Life Fieldhouse; 17,010 | 40–39 |
| 80 | April 8 | @ Philadelphia | W 90–82 | Giannis Antetokounmpo (20) | Giannis Antetokounmpo (10) | Giannis Antetokounmpo (6) | Wells Fargo Center; 16,301 | 41–39 |
| 81 | April 10 | Charlotte | W 89–79 | Greg Monroe (16) | Giannis Antetokounmpo (11) | Giannis Antetokounmpo (10) | Bradley Center; 18,717 | 42–39 |
| 82 | April 12 | @ Boston | L 94–112 | Beasley, Hawes (15) | Gary Payton II (7) | Gary Payton II (5) | Bradley Center; 18,624 | 42–40 |

2016–17 season schedule

=== Playoffs ===
2017 playoff game log
Total: 2–4 (home: 1–2; road: 1–2)
First Round: 2–4 (home: 1–2; road: 1–2)

| Game | Date | Team | Score | High points | High rebounds | High assists | Location Attendance | Series |
|---|---|---|---|---|---|---|---|---|
| 1 | April 15 | @ Toronto | W 97–83 | Giannis Antetokounmpo (28) | Greg Monroe (15) | Khris Middleton (9) | Air Canada Centre; 19,800 | 1–0 |
| 2 | April 18 | @ Toronto | L 100–106 | Giannis Antetokounmpo (24) | Giannis Antetokounmpo (15) | Giannis Antetokounmpo (7) | Air Canada Centre; 20,077 | 1–1 |
| 3 | April 20 | Toronto | W 104–77 | Khris Middleton (20) | Giannis Antetokounmpo (8) | Malcolm Brogdon (9) | Bradley Center; 18,717 | 2–1 |
| 4 | April 22 | Toronto | L 76–87 | Tony Snell (19) | Khris Middleton (11) | Giannis Antetokounmpo (4) | Bradley Center; 18,717 | 2–2 |
| 5 | April 24 | @ Toronto | L 93–118 | Giannis Antetokounmpo (30) | Giannis Antetokounmpo (9) | Khris Middleton (6) | Air Canada Centre; 20,251 | 2–3 |
| 6 | April 27 | Toronto | L 89–92 | Giannis Antetokounmpo (34) | Giannis Antetokounmpo (9) | Khris Middleton (5) | Bradley Center; 18,717 | 2–4 |

2017 playoff schedule

== Player statistics ==
=== Regular season ===
Milwaukee Bucks statistics
| Player | GP | GS | MPG | FG% | 3P% | FT% | RPG | APG | SPG | BPG | PPG |
|---|---|---|---|---|---|---|---|---|---|---|---|
| Giannis Antetokounmpo | 80 | 80 | 35.6 | .521 | .272 | .770 | 8.8 | 5.4 | 1.6 | 1.9 | 22.9 |
| Michael Beasley | 56 | 6 | 16.7 | .532 | .419 | .743 | 3.4 | 0.9 | 0.5 | 0.5 | 9.4 |
| Malcolm Brogdon | 75 | 28 | 26.4 | .457 | .404 | .865 | 2.8 | 4.2 | 1.1 | 0.2 | 10.2 |
| Matthew Dellavedova | 76 | 54 | 26.1 | .390 | .367 | .854 | 1.9 | 4.7 | 0.7 | 0.0 | 7.6 |
| Spencer Hawes ^{[a]} | 19 | 0 | 9.0 | .508 | .346 | .778 | 2.4 | 1.0 | 0.1 | 0.2 | 4.4 |
| John Henson | 58 | 39 | 19.4 | .515 | .000 | .692 | 5.1 | 1.0 | 0.5 | 1.3 | 6.8 |
| Thon Maker | 57 | 34 | 9.9 | .459 | .378 | .653 | 2.0 | 0.4 | 0.2 | 0.5 | 4.0 |
| Khris Middleton | 29 | 23 | 30.7 | .450 | .433 | .880 | 4.2 | 3.4 | 1.4 | 0.2 | 14.7 |
| Greg Monroe | 81 | 0 | 22.5 | .533 | .000 | .741 | 6.6 | 2.3 | 1.1 | 0.5 | 11.7 |
| Steve Novak ^{[a]} | 8 | 0 | 2.8 | .286 | .167 | N/A | 0.4 | 0.0 | 0.0 | 0.0 | 0.6 |
| Jabari Parker | 51 | 50 | 33.9 | .490 | .365 | .743 | 6.2 | 2.8 | 1.0 | 0.4 | 20.1 |
| Miles Plumlee ^{[a]} | 32 | 12 | 9.7 | .441 | N/A | .629 | 1.7 | 0.6 | 0.3 | 0.3 | 2.6 |
| Tony Snell | 80 | 80 | 29.2 | .455 | .406 | .810 | 3.1 | 1.2 | 0.7 | 0.2 | 8.5 |
| Mirza Teletović | 70 | 2 | 16.2 | .373 | .341 | .778 | 2.3 | 0.7 | 0.2 | 0.2 | 6.4 |
| Jason Terry | 74 | 0 | 18.4 | .432 | .427 | .828 | 1.4 | 1.3 | 0.6 | 0.3 | 4.1 |
| Rashad Vaughn | 41 | 2 | 11.2 | .365 | .321 | .400 | 1.2 | 0.6 | 0.5 | 0.2 | 3.5 |

- ^{a} Statistics with the Milwaukee Bucks.

=== Playoffs ===
Milwaukee Bucks statistics
| Player | GP | GS | MPG | FG% | 3P% | FT% | RPG | APG | SPG | BPG | PPG |
|---|---|---|---|---|---|---|---|---|---|---|---|
| Giannis Antetokounmpo | 6 | 6 | 40.5 | .536 | .400 | .543 | 9.5 | 4.0 | 2.2 | 1.7 | 24.8 |
| Michael Beasley | 4 | 0 | 12.0 | .350 | .600 | .000 | 2.3 | 0.3 | 0.3 | 0.3 | 4.3 |
| Malcolm Brogdon | 6 | 6 | 30.5 | .400 | .476 | N/A | 4.3 | 3.5 | 0.5 | 0.3 | 9.0 |
| Matthew Dellavedova | 6 | 0 | 26.5 | .390 | .375 | .800 | 2.0 | 2.0 | 0.2 | 0.0 | 7.7 |
| Spencer Hawes | 3 | 0 | 5.7 | .400 | .500 | N/A | 1.3 | 0.3 | 0.0 | 0.3 | 1.7 |
| John Henson | 2 | 0 | 6.0 | .250 | N/A | 1.000 | 2.0 | 0.0 | 0.5 | 0.0 | 1.5 |
| Thon Maker | 6 | 6 | 19.3 | .387 | .200 | .818 | 3.2 | 2.0 | 0.8 | 1.8 | 5.8 |
| Khris Middleton | 6 | 6 | 38.5 | .397 | .368 | .818 | 4.7 | 5.3 | 2.0 | 0.0 | 14.5 |
| Greg Monroe | 6 | 0 | 23.5 | .529 | N/A | .833 | 7.3 | 1.7 | 1.3 | 0.5 | 13.2 |
| Tony Snell | 6 | 6 | 30.8 | .500 | .516 | N/A | 2.3 | 1.5 | 0.2 | 0.2 | 10.0 |
| Mirza Teletović | 3 | 0 | 9.0 | .167 | .250 | N/A | 1.0 | 0.0 | 0.3 | 0.0 | 1.0 |
| Jason Terry | 6 | 0 | 11.3 | .333 | .200 | 1.000 | 1.3 | 0.8 | 0.5 | 0.2 | 2.5 |
| Rashad Vaughn | 3 | 0 | 3.3 | .500 | 1.000 | N/A | 0.0 | 0.0 | 0.0 | 0.0 | 2.0 |

== Transactions ==
=== Overview ===
Players Added

Via draft

- Malcolm Brogdon
- Thon Maker

Via trade

- Michael Beasley
- Matthew Dellavedova
- Spencer Hawes
- Tony Snell

Via free agency

- Terrence Jones
- Mirza Teletovic
- Jason Terry
Players Lost

Via trade

- Michael Carter-Williams
- Tyler Ennis
- Miles Plumlee

Via free agency

- Jerryd Bayless
- O. J. Mayo
- Greivis Vasquez

Waived

- Damien Inglis
- Steve Novak
- Johnny O'Bryant III

=== Trades ===
| July 8, 2016 | To Milwaukee Bucks Matthew Dellavedova | To Cleveland Cavaliers *Draft Rights of Albert Miralles |
| September 22, 2016 | To Milwaukee Bucks Michael Beasley | To Houston Rockets Tyler Ennis |
| October 17, 2016 | To Milwaukee Bucks Tony Snell | To Chicago Bulls Michael Carter-Williams |
| February 2, 2017 | To Milwaukee Bucks Spencer Hawes; Roy Hibbert | To Charlotte Hornets Miles Plumlee |
| February 23, 2017 | To Milwaukee Bucks 2nd-round draft pick | To Denver Nuggets Roy Hibbert |

=== Free agents ===
| Player | Signed | Former team |
| Mirza Teletovic | July 11, 2016 | Phoenix Suns |
| Jason Terry | August 22, 2016 | Houston Rockets |
