= 2016–17 Los Angeles Clippers season =

NBA professional basketball team season

- Head coach: Doc Rivers
- Owners: Steve Ballmer
- Arena: Staples Center

Results
- Record: 51–31 (.622)
- Place: Division: 2nd (Pacific); Conference: 4th (Western)
- Playoff finish: First Round (lost to Jazz 3–4)
- Stats at Basketball Reference

Local media
- Television: Fox Sports West and Prime Ticket; KCOP-TV
- Radio: KLAC

The 2016–17 Los Angeles Clippers season was the 47th season of the franchise in the National Basketball Association (NBA), their 39th season in Southern California, and their 33rd season in Los Angeles.

After 19 years, this was Paul Pierce's final season in the NBA, announcing his retirement after the season on September 26, 2016. He would retire as a Celtic on July 17, 2017, after signing a ceremonial contract with the Boston Celtics. On February 11, 2018, the Celtics retired Pierce's jersey. Pierce had played for the Celtics from 1998 to 2013.

The Clippers finished the regular season with a 51–31 record, securing the 4th seed. In the playoffs, they faced off against the Utah Jazz in the first round, where they lost in seven games.

Following the season, Chris Paul was traded to the Houston Rockets for Patrick Beverley, Lou Williams, Sam Dekker, Montrezl Harrell, Darrun Hilliard, DeAndre Liggins, Kyle Wiltjer, a 2018 first-round pick, and cash.

== Draft ==
| Round | Pick | Player | Position | Nationality | College |
|---|---|---|---|---|---|
| 1 | 25 | Brice Johnson | PF | United States | North Carolina |
| 2 | 33 | Cheick Diallo | PF/C | Mali | Kansas |

== Roster ==
2016–17 Los Angeles Clippers roster
Players

| Pos. | No. | Player | Height | Weight | DOB | From |
|---|---|---|---|---|---|---|
| SG | 9 | Alan Anderson | 6 ft 6 in (1.98 m) | 220 lb (100 kg) | 1982-10-06 | Michigan State |
| PF | 30 | Brandon Bass | 6 ft 8 in (2.03 m) | 250 lb (113 kg) | 1985-04-30 | LSU |
| SG | 11 | Jamal Crawford | 6 ft 5 in (1.96 m) | 195 lb (88 kg) | 1980-03-20 | Michigan |
| PG | 2 | Raymond Felton | 6 ft 1 in (1.85 m) | 205 lb (93 kg) | 1984-06-26 | North Carolina |
| PF | 32 | Blake Griffin | 6 ft 10 in (2.08 m) | 251 lb (114 kg) | 1989-03-16 | Oklahoma |
| PF | 10 | Brice Johnson | 6 ft 10 in (2.08 m) | 230 lb (104 kg) | 1994-06-27 | North Carolina |
| SF | 33 | Wesley Johnson | 6 ft 7 in (2.01 m) | 215 lb (98 kg) | 1987-07-11 | Syracuse |
| C | 6 | DeAndre Jordan | 6 ft 11 in (2.11 m) | 265 lb (120 kg) | 1988-07-21 | Texas A&M |
| PF | 12 | Luc Mbah a Moute | 6 ft 8 in (2.03 m) | 230 lb (104 kg) | 1986-09-09 | UCLA |
| PG | 3 | Chris Paul | 6 ft 0 in (1.83 m) | 175 lb (79 kg) | 1985-05-06 | Wake Forest |
| SF | 34 | Paul Pierce | 6 ft 7 in (2.01 m) | 235 lb (107 kg) | 1977-10-13 | Kansas |
| SG | 4 | JJ Redick | 6 ft 4 in (1.93 m) | 190 lb (86 kg) | 1984-06-24 | Duke |
| PG | 25 | Austin Rivers | 6 ft 4 in (1.93 m) | 200 lb (91 kg) | 1992-08-01 | Duke |
| C | 5 | Marreese Speights | 6 ft 10 in (2.08 m) | 255 lb (116 kg) | 1987-08-04 | Florida |
| C | 0 | Diamond Stone | 7 ft 0 in (2.13 m) | 265 lb (120 kg) | 1997-02-10 | Maryland |

Coaches
Head coach
- Doc Rivers
Assistant(s)
- Sam Cassell
- Armond Hill
- Brendan O'Connor
- Pat Sullivan
- John Welch
- Mike Woodson
- J. P. Clark (player development)

Legend
- (DP) Unsigned draft pick
- (FA) Free agent
- (S) Suspended
- (DL) On assignment to D-League affiliate
- Injured

Roster
Updated: 2017-05-04

=== Roster notes ===
- Forward Brandon Bass becomes the 26th former Laker to play for the crosstown rival Clippers.

== Standings ==
=== By Division ===
| Pacific Division | W | L | PCT | GB | Home | Road | Div | GP |
|---|---|---|---|---|---|---|---|---|
| z – Golden State Warriors | 67 | 15 | .817 | – | 36‍–‍5 | 31‍–‍10 | 14–2 | 82 |
| x – Los Angeles Clippers | 51 | 31 | .622 | 16.0 | 29‍–‍12 | 22‍–‍19 | 10–6 | 82 |
| e – Sacramento Kings | 32 | 50 | .390 | 35.0 | 17‍–‍24 | 15‍–‍26 | 7–9 | 82 |
| e – Los Angeles Lakers | 26 | 56 | .317 | 41.0 | 17‍–‍24 | 9‍–‍32 | 6–10 | 82 |
| e – Phoenix Suns | 24 | 58 | .293 | 43.0 | 15‍–‍26 | 9‍–‍32 | 3–13 | 82 |

=== By Conference ===
Western Conference
| # | Team | W | L | PCT | GB | GP |
|---|---|---|---|---|---|---|
| 1 | z – Golden State Warriors * | 67 | 15 | .817 | – | 82 |
| 2 | y – San Antonio Spurs * | 61 | 21 | .744 | 6.0 | 82 |
| 3 | x – Houston Rockets | 55 | 27 | .671 | 12.0 | 82 |
| 4 | x – Los Angeles Clippers | 51 | 31 | .622 | 16.0 | 82 |
| 5 | y – Utah Jazz * | 51 | 31 | .622 | 16.0 | 82 |
| 6 | x – Oklahoma City Thunder | 47 | 35 | .573 | 20.0 | 82 |
| 7 | x – Memphis Grizzlies | 43 | 39 | .524 | 24.0 | 82 |
| 8 | x – Portland Trail Blazers | 41 | 41 | .500 | 26.0 | 82 |
| 9 | e – Denver Nuggets | 40 | 42 | .488 | 27.0 | 82 |
| 10 | e – New Orleans Pelicans | 34 | 48 | .415 | 33.0 | 82 |
| 11 | e – Dallas Mavericks | 33 | 49 | .402 | 34.0 | 82 |
| 12 | e – Sacramento Kings | 32 | 50 | .390 | 35.0 | 82 |
| 13 | e – Minnesota Timberwolves | 31 | 51 | .378 | 36.0 | 82 |
| 14 | e – Los Angeles Lakers | 26 | 56 | .317 | 41.0 | 82 |
| 15 | e – Phoenix Suns | 24 | 58 | .293 | 43.0 | 82 |

== Game log ==
=== Pre-season ===
2016 pre-season game log
Total: 3–3 (home: 2–1; road: 1–2)
Pre-season: 3–3 (home: 2–1; road: 1–2)

| Game | Date | Team | Score | High points | High rebounds | High assists | Location Attendance | Record |
|---|---|---|---|---|---|---|---|---|
| 1 | October 4 | @ Golden State | L 75–120 | Marreese Speights (14) | Blake Griffin (6) | Jamal Crawford (4) | Oracle Arena; 19,596 | 0–1 |
| 2 | October 5 | Toronto | W 104–98 | Blake Griffin (24) | DeAndre Jordan (10) | Chris Paul (15) | Staples Center; 13,957 | 1–1 |
| 3 | October 10 | Utah | L 94–96 | Jamal Crawford (16) | DeAndre Jordan (6) | Chris Paul (5) | Staples Center; 12,518 | 1–2 |
| 4 | October 13 | Portland | W 109–108 | Blake Griffin (26) | DeAndre Jordan (9) | Chris Paul (10) | Staples Center; 14,896 | 2–2 |
| 5 | October 17 | @ Utah | L 78–104 | Austin Rivers (15) | Brandon Bass (10) | Austin Rivers (4) | Vivint Smart Home Arena; 18,811 | 2–3 |
| 6 | October 18 | @ Sacramento | W 92–89 | JJ Redick (18) | DeAndre Jordan (7) | Chris Paul (8) | Golden 1 Center; 16,000 | 3–3 |

2016–17 season schedule

=== Regular season ===
2016–17 game log
Total: 51–31 (home: 29–12; road: 22–19)
October: 3–0 (home: 2–0; road: 1–0)

| Game | Date | Team | Score | High points | High rebounds | High assists | Location Attendance | Record |
|---|---|---|---|---|---|---|---|---|
| 1 | October 27 | @ Portland | W 114–106 | Paul, Griffin (27) | Blake Griffin (13) | Chris Paul (5) | Moda Center; 19,500 | 1–0 |
| 2 | October 30 | Utah | W 88–75 | Austin Rivers (19) | DeAndre Jordan (16) | Chris Paul (9) | Staples Center; 19,060 | 2–0 |
| 3 | October 31 | Phoenix | W 116–98 | Chris Paul (24) | Jordan, Griffin (11) | Chris Paul (8) | Staples Center; 19,060 | 3–0 |

November : 11–5 (home: 5–2; road: 6–3)

| Game | Date | Team | Score | High points | High rebounds | High assists | Location Attendance | Record |
|---|---|---|---|---|---|---|---|---|
| 4 | November 2 | Oklahoma City | L 83–85 | Chris Paul (15) | Chris Paul (11) | Chris Paul (9) | Staples Center; 19,060 | 3–1 |
| 5 | November 4 | @ Memphis | W 98–88 | Chris Paul (27) | DeAndre Jordan (21) | Chris Paul (11) | FedExForum; 19,060 | 4–1 |
| 6 | November 5 | @ San Antonio | W 116–92 | Blake Griffin (28) | Jordan, Paul, Speights (8) | Chris Paul (10) | AT&T Center; 18,418 | 5–1 |
| 7 | November 7 | Detroit | W 114–82 | Chris Paul (24) | Jordan, Griffin (10) | Blake Griffin (9) | Staples Center; 19,060 | 6–1 |
| 8 | November 9 | Portland | W 111–80 | Blake Griffin (22) | Blake Griffin (13) | Chris Paul (7) | Staples Center; 19,060 | 7–1 |
| 9 | November 11 | @ Oklahoma City | W 110–108 | Blake Griffin (25) | DeAndre Jordan (13) | Chris Paul (10) | Chesapeake Energy Arena; 18,203 | 8–1 |
| 10 | November 12 | @ Minnesota | W 119–105 | Blake Griffin (20) | DeAndre Jordan (16) | Chris Paul (8) | Target Center; 14,494 | 9–1 |
| 11 | November 14 | Brooklyn | W 127–95 | Chris Paul (21) | DeAndre Jordan (14) | Chris Paul (9) | Staples Center; 19,060 | 10–1 |
| 12 | November 16 | Memphis | L 107–111 | JJ Redick (29) | DeAndre Jordan (14) | Chris Paul (6) | Staples Center; 19,060 | 10–2 |
| 13 | November 18 | @ Sacramento | W 121–115 | JJ Redick (26) | DeAndre Jordan (12) | Chris Paul (12) | Golden 1 Center; 17,608 | 11–2 |
| 14 | November 19 | Chicago | W 102–95 | Blake Griffin (26) | Blake Griffin (13) | Chris Paul (8) | Staples Center; 19,060 | 12–2 |
| 15 | November 21 | Toronto | W 123–115 | Paul, Griffin (26) | DeAndre Jordan (15) | Chris Paul (12) | Staples Center; 19,060 | 13–2 |
| 16 | November 23 | @ Dallas | W 124–104 | Austin Rivers (22) | Marreese Speights (12) | Blake Griffin (7) | American Airlines Center; 20,042 | 14–2 |
| 17 | November 25 | @ Detroit | L 97–108 | Redick, Griffin (24) | DeAndre Jordan (9) | Chris Paul (15) | Palace of Auburn Hills; 17,023 | 14–3 |
| 18 | November 27 | @ Indiana | L 70–91 | Blake Griffin (16) | DeAndre Jordan (14) | Chris Paul (4) | Bankers Life Fieldhouse; 15,572 | 14–4 |
| 19 | November 29 | @ Brooklyn | L 122–127 (2OT) | Chris Paul (26) | DeAndre Jordan (20) | Chris Paul (13) | Barclays Center; 15,681 | 14–5 |

December : 8–9 (home: 4–4; road: 4–5)

| Game | Date | Team | Score | High points | High rebounds | High assists | Location Attendance | Record |
|---|---|---|---|---|---|---|---|---|
| 20 | December 1 | @ Cleveland | W 113–94 | JJ Redick (23) | DeAndre Jordan (15) | Blake Griffin (11) | Quicken Loans Arena; 20,562 | 15–5 |
| 21 | December 2 | @ New Orleans | W 114–96 | Blake Griffin (27) | DeAndre Jordan (13) | Chris Paul (13) | Smoothie King Center; 20,562 | 16–5 |
| 22 | December 4 | Indiana | L 102–111 | Blake Griffin (24) | Blake Griffin (16) | Chris Paul (11) | Staples Center; 19,060 | 16–6 |
| 23 | December 7 | Golden State | L 98–115 | Jamal Crawford (21) | DeAndre Jordan (12) | Chris Paul (5) | Staples Center; 19,239 | 16−7 |
| 24 | December 10 | New Orleans | W 133–105 | Chris Paul (20) | Marreese Speights (12) | Chris Paul (20) | Staples Center; 19,060 | 17−7 |
| 25 | December 12 | Portland | W 121–120 | Blake Griffin (26) | Jordan, Griffin (12) | Chris Paul (14) | Staples Center; 19,060 | 18–7 |
| 26 | December 14 | @ Orlando | W 113–108 | Austin Rivers (25) | DeAndre Jordan (12) | Chris Paul (10) | Amway Center; 18,846 | 19–7 |
| 27 | December 16 | @ Miami | W 102–98 | Blake Griffin (20) | DeAndre Jordan (19) | Chris Paul (6) | American Airlines Arena; 19,600 | 20–7 |
| 28 | December 18 | @ Washington | L 110–117 | Blake Griffin (26) | DeAndre Jordan (17) | Chris Paul (12) | Verizon Center; 17,380 | 20–8 |
| 29 | December 20 | Denver | W 119–102 | JJ Redick (27) | DeAndre Jordan (13) | Chris Paul (15) | Staples Center; 19,060 | 21–8 |
| 30 | December 22 | San Antonio | W 106–101 | Chris Paul (19) | DeAndre Jordan (9) | Chris Paul (6) | Staples Center; 19,060 | 22–8 |
| 31 | December 23 | Dallas | L 88–90 | Jamal Crawford (26) | DeAndre Jordan (17) | Jamal Crawford (6) | Staples Center; 19,060 | 22–9 |
| 32 | December 25 | @ L.A. Lakers | L 102–111 | Crawford, Redick (22) | Felton, Jordan (10) | Felton, Jordan (6) | Staples Center; 18,997 | 22–10 |
| 33 | December 26 | Denver | L 102–106 | Jamal Crawford (24) | DeAndre Jordan (11) | Jamal Crawford (6) | Staples Center; 19,060 | 22–11 |
| 34 | December 28 | @ New Orleans | L 98–102 | Austin Rivers (22) | DeAndre Jordan (25) | Chris Paul (6) | Smoothie King Center; 16,647 | 22–12 |
| 35 | December 30 | @ Houston | L 116–140 | Raymond Felton (26) | DeAndre Jordan (13) | Raymond Felton (8) | Toyota Center; 18,055 | 22–13 |
| 36 | December 31 | @ Oklahoma City | L 88–114 | Bass, Speights (18) | DeAndre Jordan (11) | Jamal Crawford (5) | Chesapeake Energy Arena; 18,203 | 22–14 |

January : 8–4 (home: 6–1; road: 2–3)

| Game | Date | Team | Score | High points | High rebounds | High assists | Location Attendance | Record |
|---|---|---|---|---|---|---|---|---|
| 37 | January 2 | Phoenix | W 109–98 | JJ Redick (22) | DeAndre Jordan (20) | Crawford, Felton, Rivers (5) | Staples Center; 19,060 | 23–14 |
| 38 | January 4 | Memphis | W 115–106 | Austin Rivers (28) | DeAndre Jordan (20) | Austin Rivers (7) | Staples Center; 19,060 | 24–14 |
| 39 | January 6 | @ Sacramento | W 106–98 | Austin Rivers (24) | Marreese Speights (11) | Chris Paul (12) | Golden 1 Center; 17,608 | 25–14 |
| 40 | January 8 | Miami | W 98–86 | JJ Redick (25) | DeAndre Jordan (18) | Chris Paul (18) | Staples Center; 19,060 | 26–14 |
| 41 | January 11 | Orlando | W 105–96 | JJ Redick (22) | DeAndre Jordan (20) | Chris Paul (6) | Staples Center; 19,060 | 27–14 |
| 42 | January 14 | L. A. Lakers | W 113–97 | DeAndre Jordan (24) | DeAndre Jordan (21) | Chris Paul (13) | Staples Center; 19,060 | 28–14 |
| 43 | January 16 | Oklahoma City | W 120–98 | Marreese Speights (23) | DeAndre Jordan (15) | Felton, Paul, Rivers (6) | Staples Center; 19,060 | 29–14 |
| 44 | January 19 | Minnesota | L 101–104 | DeAndre Jordan (29) | DeAndre Jordan (16) | Raymond Felton (8) | Staples Center; 19,060 | 29–15 |
| 45 | January 21 | @ Denver | L 98–123 | Marreese Speights (18) | DeAndre Jordan (13) | Jamal Crawford (7) | Pepsi Center; 16,543 | 29–16 |
| 46 | January 23 | @ Atlanta | W 115–105 | Austin Rivers (27) | DeAndre Jordan (12) | Austin Rivers (6) | Philips Arena; 15,866 | 30–16 |
| 47 | January 24 | @ Philadelphia | L 110–121 | Jamal Crawford (27) | DeAndre Jordan (20) | Blake Griffin (6) | Wells Fargo Center; 16,741 | 30–17 |
| 48 | January 28 | @ Golden State | L 98–144 | Blake Griffin (20) | Raymond Felton (7) | Austin Rivers (6) | Oracle Arena; 19,596 | 30–18 |

February : 6–5 (home: 2–2; road: 4–3)

| Game | Date | Team | Score | High points | High rebounds | High assists | Location Attendance | Record |
|---|---|---|---|---|---|---|---|---|
| 49 | February 1 | @ Phoenix | W 124–114 | Blake Griffin (29) | DeAndre Jordan (12) | Crawford, Griffin (5) | Talking Stick Resort Arena; 16,191 | 31–18 |
| 50 | February 2 | Golden State | L 120–133 | Blake Griffin (31) | Blake Griffin (8) | Austin Rivers (6) | Staples Center; 19,060 | 31−19 |
| 51 | February 5 | @ Boston | L 102–107 | Crawford, Griffin (23) | DeAndre Jordan (16) | Crawford, Rivers (6) | TD Garden; 18,624 | 31–20 |
| 52 | February 6 | @ Toronto | L 109–118 | Blake Griffin (26) | Blake Griffin (11) | Blake Griffin (11) | Air Canada Centre; 19,800 | 31–21 |
| 53 | February 8 | @ New York | W 119–115 | Blake Griffin (32) | DeAndre Jordan (15) | Austin Rivers (10) | Madison Square Garden; 17,445 | 32–21 |
| 54 | February 11 | @ Charlotte | W 107–102 | Jamal Crawford (22) | DeAndre Jordan (16) | Blake Griffin (8) | Spectrum Center; 16,567 | 33–21 |
| 55 | February 13 | @ Utah | W 88–72 | Blake Griffin (26) | DeAndre Jordan (13) | Blake Griffin (6) | Vivint Smart Home Arena; 19,521 | 34–21 |
| 56 | February 15 | Atlanta | W 99–84 | Blake Griffin (17) | DeAndre Jordan (16) | Blake Griffin (9) | Staples Center; 19,060 | 35–21 |
| 57 | February 23 | @ Golden State | L 113–123 | Crawford, Rivers (19) | DeAndre Jordan (11) | Blake Griffin (8) | Oracle Arena; 18,654 | 35-22 |
| 58 | February 24 | San Antonio | L 97–105 | Blake Griffin (29) | Blake Griffin (9) | Griffin, Paul (5) | Staples Center; 19,060 | 35–23 |
| 59 | February 26 | Charlotte | W 124–121 (OT) | Blake Griffin (43) | DeAndre Jordan (19) | Chris Paul (17) | Staples Center; 19,060 | 36–23 |

March : 10–8 (home: 6–3; road: 4–5)

| Game | Date | Team | Score | High points | High rebounds | High assists | Location Attendance | Record |
|---|---|---|---|---|---|---|---|---|
| 60 | March 1 | Houston | L 103–122 | Blake Griffin (17) | DeAndre Jordan (9) | Chris Paul (11) | Staples Center; 19,060 | 36–24 |
| 61 | March 3 | @ Milwaukee | L 101–112 | Griffin, Paul (21) | DeAndre Jordan (10) | Blake Griffin (8) | BMO Harris Bradley Center; 16,208 | 36–25 |
| 62 | March 4 | @ Chicago | W 101–91 | Jamal Crawford (25) | DeAndre Jordan (11) | Blake Griffin (7) | United Center; 15,555 | 37–25 |
| 63 | March 6 | Boston | W 116–102 | Blake Griffin (26) | DeAndre Jordan (12) | Crawford, Felton (5) | Staples Center; 19,283 | 38–25 |
| 64 | March 8 | @ Minnesota | L 91–107 | DeAndre Jordan (20) | DeAndre Jordan (10) | Chris Paul (13) | Target Center; 15,653 | 38–26 |
| 65 | March 9 | @ Memphis | W 114–98 | Austin Rivers (20) | Blake Griffin (12) | Blake Griffin (8) | FedEx Forum; 16,721 | 39–26 |
| 66 | March 11 | Philadelphia | W 112–100 | Chris Paul (30) | DeAndre Jordan (20) | Chris Paul (7) | Staples Center; 19,060 | 40–26 |
| 67 | March 13 | @ Utah | L 108–114 | Chris Paul (33) | Blake Griffin (9) | Chris Paul (7) | Vivint Smart Home Arena; 18,428 | 40–27 |
| 68 | March 15 | Milwaukee | L 96–97 | DeAndre Jordan (22) | DeAndre Jordan (17) | Chris Paul (7) | Staples Center; 19,060 | 40–28 |
| 69 | March 16 | @ Denver | L 114–129 | JJ Redick (22) | Luc Mbah a Moute (6) | Chris Paul (14) | Pepsi Center; 16,527 | 40–29 |
| 70 | March 18 | Cleveland | W 108–78 | Blake Griffin (23) | DeAndre Jordan (17) | Chris Paul (7) | Staples Center; 19,060 | 41–29 |
| 71 | March 20 | New York | W 114–105 | Blake Griffin (30) | DeAndre Jordan (10) | Chris Paul (13) | Staples Center; 19,060 | 42–29 |
| 72 | March 21 | @ L. A. Lakers | W 133–109 | Chris Paul (27) | DeAndre Jordan (11) | Blake Griffin (8) | Staples Center; 18,724 | 43–29 |
| 73 | March 23 | @ Dallas | L 95–97 | Blake Griffin (24) | DeAndre Jordan (18) | Chris Paul (6) | American Airlines Arena; 19,703 | 43–30 |
| 74 | March 25 | Utah | W 108–95 | Jamal Crawford (28) | DeAndre Jordan (15) | Chris Paul (5) | Staples Center; 19,060 | 44–30 |
| 75 | March 26 | Sacramento | L 97–98 | DeAndre Jordan (20) | DeAndre Jordan (11) | Chris Paul (9) | Staples Center; 19,060 | 44–31 |
| 76 | March 29 | Washington | W 133–124 | JJ Redick (31) | DeAndre Jordan (18) | Chris Paul (13) | Staples Center; 19,060 | 45–31 |
| 77 | March 30 | @ Phoenix | W 124–118 | Blake Griffin (31) | DeAndre Jordan (17) | Chris Paul (10) | Talking Stick Resort Arena; 16,602 | 46–31 |

April: 5–0 (home: 4–0; road: 1–0)

| Game | Date | Team | Score | High points | High rebounds | High assists | Location Attendance | Record |
|---|---|---|---|---|---|---|---|---|
| 78 | April 1 | L. A. Lakers | W 115–104 | Blake Griffin (36) | DeAndre Jordan (12) | Chris Paul (12) | Staples Center; 19,060 | 47–31 |
| 79 | April 5 | Dallas | W 112–101 | Blake Griffin (32) | DeAndre Jordan (20) | Chris Paul (11) | Staples Center; 19,060 | 48–31 |
| 80 | April 8 | @ San Antonio | W 98–87 | Chris Paul (19) | DeAndre Jordan (16) | Chris Paul (8) | AT&T Center; 18,418 | 49–31 |
| 81 | April 10 | Houston | W 125–96 | Crawford, Paul (19) | DeAndre Jordan (11) | Chris Paul (9) | Staples Center; 19,163 | 50–31 |
| 82 | April 12 | Sacramento | W 115–95 | Jordan, Redick (18) | DeAndre Jordan (17) | Chris Paul (9) | Staples Center; 19,060 | 51–31 |

2016–17 season schedule

=== Playoffs ===
2017 playoff game log
Total: 3–4 (home: 1–3; road: 2–1)
First Round: 3–4 (home: 1–3; road: 2–1)

| Game | Date | Team | Score | High points | High rebounds | High assists | Location Attendance | Series |
|---|---|---|---|---|---|---|---|---|
| 1 | April 15 | Utah | L 95–97 | Blake Griffin (26) | DeAndre Jordan (15) | Chris Paul (11) | Staples Center; 19,060 | 0–1 |
| 2 | April 18 | Utah | W 99–91 | Blake Griffin (24) | DeAndre Jordan (15) | Chris Paul (10) | Staples Center; 19,060 | 1–1 |
| 3 | April 21 | @ Utah | W 111–106 | Chris Paul (34) | DeAndre Jordan (13) | Chris Paul (10) | Vivint Smart Home Arena; 18,865 | 2–1 |
| 4 | April 23 | @ Utah | L 98–105 | Chris Paul (27) | DeAndre Jordan (10) | Chris Paul (12) | Vivint Smart Home Arena; 19,911 | 2–2 |
| 5 | April 25 | Utah | L 92–96 | Chris Paul (28) | DeAndre Jordan (12) | Chris Paul (9) | Staples Center; 19,060 | 2–3 |
| 6 | April 28 | @ Utah | W 98–93 | Chris Paul (29) | DeAndre Jordan (18) | Chris Paul (8) | Vivint Smart Home Arena; 19,121 | 3–3 |
| 7 | April 30 | Utah | L 91–104 | DeAndre Jordan (24) | DeAndre Jordan (17) | Chris Paul (9) | Staples Center; 19,060 | 3–4 |

2017 playoff schedule

== Player statistics ==
Legend
| GP | Games played | GS | Games started | MPG | Minutes per game |
| FG% | Field-goal percentage | 3P% | 3-point field-goal percentage | FT% | Free-throw percentage |
| RPG | Rebounds per game | APG | Assists per game | SPG | Steals per game |
| BPG | Blocks per game | PPG | Points per game |

=== Regular season ===
| Player | GP | GS | MPG | FG% | 3P% | FT% | RPG | APG | SPG | BPG | PPG |
|---|---|---|---|---|---|---|---|---|---|---|---|
| Marreese Speights | 82 | 2 | 15.7 | .445 | .372 | .876 | 4.5 | .8 | .3 | .5 | 8.7 |
| Jamal Crawford | 82 | 1 | 26.3 | .413 | .360 | .857 | 1.6 | 2.6 | .7 | .2 | 12.3 |
| DeAndre Jordan | 81 | 81 | 31.7 | .714 | .000 | .482 | 13.8 | 1.2 | .6 | 1.7 | 12.7 |
| Luc Mbah a Moute | 80 | 76 | 22.3 | .505 | .391 | .678 | 2.1 | .5 | 1.0 | .4 | 6.1 |
| Raymond Felton | 80 | 11 | 21.3 | .430 | .319 | .781 | 2.7 | 2.4 | .8 | .3 | 6.7 |
| JJ Redick | 78 | 78 | 28.2 | .445 | .429 | .891 | 2.2 | 1.4 | .7 | .2 | 15.0 |
| Austin Rivers | 74 | 29 | 27.8 | .442 | .371 | .691 | 2.2 | 2.8 | .6 | .1 | 12.0 |
| Wesley Johnson | 68 | 3 | 11.9 | .365 | .246 | .647 | 2.7 | .3 | .4 | .4 | 2.7 |
| Blake Griffin | 61 | 61 | 34.0 | .493 | .336 | .760 | 8.1 | 4.9 | .9 | .4 | 21.6 |
| Chris Paul | 61 | 61 | 31.5 | .476 | .411 | .892 | 5.0 | 9.2 | 2.0 | .1 | 18.1 |
| Brandon Bass | 52 | 0 | 11.1 | .575 | .333 | .875 | 2.5 | .4 | .3 | .2 | 5.6 |
| Alan Anderson | 30 | 0 | 10.3 | .375 | .318 | .750 | .8 | .4 | .1 | .0 | 2.9 |
| Paul Pierce | 25 | 7 | 11.1 | .400 | .349 | .769 | 1.9 | .4 | .2 | .2 | 3.2 |
| Diamond Stone | 7 | 0 | 3.4 | .231 | | 1.000 | .9 | .0 | .0 | .1 | 1.4 |
| Brice Johnson | 3 | 0 | 3.0 | .286 | | | 1.0 | .3 | .7 | .3 | 1.3 |

=== Playoffs ===
| Player | GP | GS | MPG | FG% | 3P% | FT% | RPG | APG | SPG | BPG | PPG |
|---|---|---|---|---|---|---|---|---|---|---|---|
| DeAndre Jordan | 7 | 7 | 37.7 | .705 | .000 | .393 | 14.4 | .7 | .4 | .9 | 15.4 |
| Chris Paul | 7 | 7 | 37.1 | .496 | .368 | .879 | 5.0 | 9.9 | 1.7 | .1 | 25.3 |
| Luc Mbah a Moute | 7 | 7 | 32.0 | .395 | .313 | .700 | 5.0 | 1.0 | 1.1 | .6 | 7.6 |
| JJ Redick | 7 | 7 | 29.4 | .380 | .346 | .850 | 1.7 | .9 | .3 | .0 | 9.1 |
| Marreese Speights | 7 | 2 | 14.0 | .432 | .350 | .700 | 2.9 | .4 | .3 | .4 | 6.6 |
| Jamal Crawford | 7 | 0 | 28.0 | .422 | .240 | 1.000 | 1.3 | 1.9 | .6 | .1 | 12.6 |
| Raymond Felton | 7 | 0 | 18.1 | .469 | .444 | 1.000 | 1.4 | 1.4 | .9 | .0 | 5.6 |
| Paul Pierce | 7 | 0 | 14.4 | .444 | .400 | 1.000 | 2.0 | 1.0 | .3 | .0 | 3.0 |
| Blake Griffin | 3 | 3 | 33.0 | .490 | .667 | 1.000 | 6.0 | 2.3 | .7 | .3 | 20.3 |
| Austin Rivers | 3 | 2 | 30.0 | .346 | .308 | 1.000 | 2.7 | .7 | .3 | .3 | 8.0 |
| Wesley Johnson | 3 | 0 | 3.7 | | | .500 | .7 | .0 | .3 | .0 | .3 |
| Brandon Bass | 1 | 0 | 4.0 | .333 | | | 1.0 | .0 | 1.0 | .0 | 2.0 |

== Transactions ==
=== Trades ===
| June 23, 2016 | To Los Angeles Clippers Draft rights to David Michineau Draft rights to Diamond Stone | To New Orleans Pelicans Draft rights to Cheick Diallo |
| July 15, 2016 | To Los Angeles Clippers Devyn Marble 2020 second-round draft pick | To Orlando Magic C. J. Wilcox Cash considerations |

=== Free agents ===
==== Re-signed ====
| Player | Signed | Contract |
|---|---|---|
| Luc Mbah a Moute | July 8, 2016 | 2-year contract worth $4.5 million |
| Wesley Johnson | July 8, 2016 | 3-year contract worth $18 million |
| Austin Rivers | July 8, 2016 | 3-year contract worth $35 million |
| Jamal Crawford | July 8, 2016 | 3-year contract worth $42 million |

==== Additions ====
| Player | Signed | Former team |
|---|---|---|
| Marreese Speights | July 12, 2016 | Golden State Warriors |
| Brandon Bass | July 19, 2016 | Los Angeles Lakers |
| Raymond Felton | July 25, 2016 | Dallas Mavericks |
| Alan Anderson | August 2, 2016 | Washington Wizards |

==== Subtractions ====
| Player | Reason left | New team |
|---|---|---|
| Jeff Green | Free agency, July 7, 2016 | Orlando Magic |
| Cole Aldrich | Free agency, July 13, 2016 | Minnesota Timberwolves |
| Devyn Marble | Waived, July 15, 2016 | Aris Thessaloniki (GBL) |
| Branden Dawson | Waived, July 17, 2016 | Orlando Magic |
| Pablo Prigioni | Free agency, July 29, 2016 | Saski Baskonia (Liga ACB) |
| Jeff Ayres | Free agency, September 22, 2016 | CSKA Moscow (VTB United League) |
