= 2016–17 Chicago Bulls season =

NBA professional basketball team season

- Head coach: Fred Hoiberg
- President: Michael Reinsdorf
- General manager: Gar Forman
- Owners: Jerry Reinsdorf
- Arena: United Center

Results
- Record: 41–41 (.500)
- Place: Division: 4th (Central); Conference: 8th (Eastern)
- Playoff finish: First Round (lost to Celtics 2–4)
- Stats at Basketball Reference

Local media
- Television: CSN Chicago; WGN
- Radio: WLS

The 2016–17 Chicago Bulls season was the 51st season of the franchise in the National Basketball Association (NBA). Former 2011 MVP and 2009 Rookie of the Year Derrick Rose was traded from his hometown team to the New York Knicks. This was the first season without Rose since the 2012–13 season and 2006–07 without Joakim Noah, who left to sign with the Knicks. Dwyane Wade, who played for the Miami Heat from 2003 to 2016, decided to leave the Heat and sign with his hometown team, the Chicago Bulls. A Chicago native, Wade grew up as a fan of the Bulls, and Michael Jordan. The Bulls also traded Tony Snell to the Milwaukee Bucks for Michael Carter-Williams on October 17, 2016.

The Bulls finished the regular season with a 41–41 record, securing the 8th seed. In the playoffs, they faced off against the Boston Celtics in the first round, where they lost in 6 games.

Following the season, Jimmy Butler was traded to the Minnesota Timberwolves, Rajon Rondo was released and signed with the New Orleans Pelicans, and Dwyane Wade signed with the Cleveland Cavaliers.

This season marked the last time the Bulls made the playoffs until their 2021–22 season.

== Draft picks ==
Round	Pick	Player	Position	Nationality	College
1	14	Denzel Valentine	SG	United States	Michigan State
2	48	Paul Zipser	SG / SF	Germany	Bayern Munich (Germany)

== Roster ==
2016–17 Chicago Bulls roster
Players

Pos.	No.	Player	Height	Weight	DOB	From
G/F	21	Jimmy Butler	6 ft 7 in (2.01 m)	231 lb (105 kg)	1989-09-14	Marquette
G	0	Isaiah Canaan	6 ft 0 in (1.83 m)	201 lb (91 kg)	1991-05-21	Murray State
G	7	Michael Carter-Williams	6 ft 6 in (1.98 m)	190 lb (86 kg)	1991-10-10	Syracuse
C	6	Cristiano Felício	6 ft 11 in (2.11 m)	280 lb (127 kg)	1992-07-07	CCSE Prep (CA)
G	2	Jerian Grant	6 ft 4 in (1.93 m)	198 lb (90 kg)	1992-10-09	Notre Dame
C	77	Joffrey Lauvergne	7 ft 0 in (2.13 m)	260 lb (118 kg)	1991-09-30	France
C	8	Robin Lopez	7 ft 0 in (2.13 m)	255 lb (116 kg)	1988-04-01	Stanford
F	44	Nikola Mirotić	6 ft 10 in (2.08 m)	238 lb (108 kg)	1991-02-11	Spain
F	17	Anthony Morrow	6 ft 5 in (1.96 m)	210 lb (95 kg)	1985-09-27	Georgia Tech
G	22	Cameron Payne	6 ft 3 in (1.91 m)	185 lb (84 kg)	1994-08-08	Murray State
F	5	Bobby Portis	6 ft 11 in (2.11 m)	246 lb (112 kg)	1995-02-10	Arkansas
G	9	Rajon Rondo	6 ft 1 in (1.85 m)	186 lb (84 kg)	1986-02-22	Kentucky
G	45	Denzel Valentine	6 ft 6 in (1.98 m)	212 lb (96 kg)	1993-11-16	Michigan State
G	3	Dwyane Wade	6 ft 4 in (1.93 m)	220 lb (100 kg)	1982-01-17	Marquette
F	16	Paul Zipser	6 ft 8 in (2.03 m)	210 lb (95 kg)	1994-02-18	Germany

Coaches
Head coach
- Fred Hoiberg
Assistant(s)
- Randy Brown
- Charlie Henry
- Pete Myers
- Mike Wilhelm
- Jim Boylen (Associate HC)
- Jeff Tanaka (trainer)

Legend
- (DP) Unsigned draft pick
- (FA) Free agent
- (S) Suspended
- (DL) On assignment to D-League affiliate
- Injured

Roster
Updated: March 29, 2017

== Standings ==
=== Division ===
Central Division	W	L	PCT	GB	Home	Road	Div	GP
y – Cleveland Cavaliers	51	31	.622	–	31‍–‍10	20‍–‍21	8–8	82
x – Milwaukee Bucks	42	40	.512	9.0	23‍–‍18	19‍–‍22	10–6	82
x – Indiana Pacers	42	40	.512	9.0	29‍–‍12	13‍–‍28	8–8	82
x – Chicago Bulls	41	41	.500	10.0	25‍–‍16	16‍–‍25	9–7	82
Detroit Pistons	37	45	.451	14.0	24‍–‍17	13‍–‍28	5–11	82

=== Conference ===
Eastern Conference
#	Team	W	L	PCT	GB	GP
1	c – Boston Celtics *	53	29	.646	–	82
2	y – Cleveland Cavaliers *	51	31	.622	2.0	82
3	x – Toronto Raptors	51	31	.622	2.0	82
4	y – Washington Wizards *	49	33	.598	4.0	82
5	x – Atlanta Hawks	43	39	.524	10.0	82
6	x – Milwaukee Bucks	42	40	.512	11.0	82
7	x – Indiana Pacers	42	40	.512	11.0	82
8	x – Chicago Bulls	41	41	.500	12.0	82
9	Miami Heat	41	41	.500	12.0	82
10	Detroit Pistons	37	45	.451	16.0	82
11	Charlotte Hornets	36	46	.439	17.0	82
12	New York Knicks	31	51	.378	22.0	82
13	Orlando Magic	29	53	.354	24.0	82
14	Philadelphia 76ers	28	54	.341	25.0	82
15	Brooklyn Nets	20	62	.244	33.0	82

== Game log ==
=== Preseason ===
2016 pre-season game log
Total: 3-4 (home: 2-3; road: 1-1)
Pre-season: 3–4 (home: 2–3; road: 1–1)

Game	Date	Team	Score	High points	High rebounds	High assists	Location Attendance	Record
1	October 3	Milwaukee	L 91–93	Butler, McDermott (13)	Taj Gibson (12)	Rajon Rondo (7)	United Center; 20,104	0–1
2	October 6	@ Indiana	L 108–115	Spencer Dinwiddie (19)	Spencer Dinwiddie (6)	Rajon Rondo (5)	Bankers Life Fieldhouse; 12,925	0–2
3	October 8	Indiana	W 121–105	Dwyane Wade (22)	Nikola Mirotic (9)	Dwyane Wade (8)	United Center; 20,096	1–2
4	October 14	Cleveland	W 118–108	Rajon Rondo (30)	Taj Gibson (11)	Rajon Rondo (6)	United Center; 21,766	2–2
5	October 15	@ Milwaukee	W 107–86	Isaiah Canaan (25)	Robin Lopez (11)	Jerian Grant (7)	BMO Harris Bradley Center; 10,794	3–2
6	October 17	Charlotte	L 104–108 (OT)	Jimmy Butler (15)	Cristiano Felicio (12)	Rajon Rondo (10)	United Center; 20,025	3–3
7	October 20	@ Atlanta	L 81–97	Jimmy Butler (18)	Gibson, Rondo (9)	Butler, Rondo, Wade (6)	CenturyLink Center Omaha; 16,506	3–4

2016–17 pre-season schedule

=== Regular season ===
2016–17 game log
Total: 41–41 (home: 25–16; road: 16–25)
October: 3–0 (home: 2–0; road: 1–0)

Game	Date	Team	Score	High points	High rebounds	High assists	Location Attendance	Record
1	October 27	Boston	W 105–99	Jimmy Butler (24)	Taj Gibson (10)	Rajon Rondo (9)	United Center; 21,501	1–0
2	October 29	Indiana	W 118–101	Doug McDermott (23)	Gibson, Felicio (8)	Rajon Rondo (13)	United Center; 21,373	2–0
3	October 31	@ Brooklyn	W 118–88	Jimmy Butler (23)	Taj Gibson (11)	Isaiah Canaan (6)	Barclays Center; 15,842	3–0

November : 7–7 (home: 2–2; road: 5–5)

Game	Date	Team	Score	High points	High rebounds	High assists	Location Attendance	Record
4	November 2	@ Boston	L 100–107	Jimmy Butler (23)	Rajon Rondo (10)	Rajon Rondo (5)	TD Garden; 18,624	3–1
5	November 4	New York	L 104–117	Dwyane Wade (35)	Dwyane Wade (10)	Rajon Rondo (5)	United Center; 22,376	3–2
6	November 5	@ Indiana	L 94–111	Butler, Portis (16)	Taj Gibson (12)	Rajon Rondo (5)	Bankers Life Fieldhouse; 17,020	3–3
7	November 7	Orlando	W 112–80	Jimmy Butler (20)	Taj Gibson (11)	Jimmy Butler (7)	United Center; 21,320	4–3
8	November 9	@ Atlanta	L 107–115	Jimmy Butler (39)	Taj Gibson (6)	Rondo, Butler (7)	Philips Arena; 16,354	4–4
9	November 10	@ Miami	W 98–95	Jimmy Butler (20)	Rajon Rondo (12)	Rajon Rondo (6)	American Airlines Arena; 19,600	5–4
10	November 12	Washington	W 106–95	Jimmy Butler (37)	Robin Lopez (13)	Jimmy Butler (9)	United Center; 21,962	6–4
11	November 15	@ Portland	W 113–88	Jimmy Butler (27)	Jimmy Butler (12)	Butler, Wade (5)	Moda Center; 13,393	7–4
12	November 17	@ Utah	W 85–77	Jimmy Butler (20)	Butler, Lopez (12)	Jimmy Butler (3)	Vivint Smart Home Arena; 19,911	8–4
13	November 19	@ L.A. Clippers	L 95–102	Dwyane Wade (28)	Rajon Rondo (10)	Rajon Rondo (8)	Staples Center; 19,060	8–5
14	November 20	@ L.A. Lakers	W 118–110	Jimmy Butler (40)	Nikola Mirotic (15)	Rajon Rondo (12)	Staples Center; 18,997	9–5
15	November 22	@ Denver	L 107–110	Jimmy Butler (35)	Rajon Rondo (11)	Rajon Rondo (8)	Pepsi Center; 14,328	9–6
16	November 25	@ Philadelphia	W 105–89	Jimmy Butler (26)	Rajon Rondo (8)	Rajon Rondo (10)	Wells Fargo Center; 18,234	10–6
17	November 30	L.A. Lakers	L 90–96	Jimmy Butler (22)	Taj Gibson (10)	Rondo, Wade (6)	United Center; 21,773	10–7

December : 6–11 (home: 6–5; road: 0–6)

Game	Date	Team	Score	High points	High rebounds	High assists	Location Attendance	Record
18	December 2	Cleveland	W 111–105	Jimmy Butler (26)	Rondo, Gibson (11)	Rajon Rondo (12)	United Center; 21,775	11–7
19	December 3	@ Dallas	L 82–107	Jimmy Butler (26)	Jimmy Butler (9)	Jimmy Butler (4)	American Airlines Center; 19,857	11–8
20	December 5	Portland	L 110–112	Dwyane Wade (34)	Robin Lopez (14)	Jimmy Butler (5)	United Center; 21,351	11–9
21	December 6	@ Detroit	L 91–102	Jimmy Butler (32)	Taj Gibson (10)	Dwyane Wade (7)	The Palace of Auburn Hills; 14,305	11–10
22	December 8	San Antonio	W 95–91	Dwyane Wade (20)	Rajon Rondo (10)	Rajon Rondo (9)	United Center; 21,489	12–10
23	December 10	Miami	W 105–100	Jimmy Butler (31)	Robin Lopez (10)	Rajon Rondo (6)	United Center; 21,348	13–10
24	December 13	Minnesota	L 94–99	Jimmy Butler (27)	Jimmy Butler (9)	Jimmy Butler (6)	United Center; 21,146	13–11
25	December 15	@ Milwaukee	L 97–108	Jimmy Butler (21)	Robin Lopez (6)	Rajon Rondo (8)	Bradley Center; 16,704	13–12
26	December 16	Milwaukee	L 69–95	Dwyane Wade (12)	Bobby Portis (8)	Jimmy Butler (6)	United Center; 21,324	13–13
27	December 19	Detroit	W 113–82	Jimmy Butler (19)	Rajon Rondo (8)	Rajon Rondo (14)	United Center; 21,400	14–13
28	December 21	Washington	L 97–107	Jimmy Butler (20)	Butler, Gibson (11)	Rajon Rondo (10)	United Center; 21,358	14–14
29	December 23	@ Charlotte	L 91–103	Jimmy Butler (26)	Nikola Mirotic (10)	Rajon Rondo (10)	Spectrum Center; 19,249	14–15
30	December 25	@ San Antonio	L 100–119	Dwyane Wade (24)	Taj Gibson (7)	Dwyane Wade (6)	AT&T Center; 18,428	14–16
31	December 26	Indiana	W 90–85	Dwyane Wade (21)	Robin Lopez (12)	Rondo, Butler, Wade (5)	United Center; 21,922	15–16
32	December 28	Brooklyn	W 101–99	Jimmy Butler (40)	Jimmy Butler (11)	Rajon Rondo (12)	United Center; 21,957	16–16
33	December 30	@ Indiana	L 101–111	Jimmy Butler (25)	Cristiano Felicio (12)	Dwyane Wade (5)	Bankers Life Fieldhouse; 17,923	16–17
34	December 31	Milwaukee	L 96–116	Jimmy Butler (26)	Robin Lopez (10)	Jimmy Butler (8)	United Center; 21,838	16–18

January : 8–7 (home: 5–4; road: 3–3)

Game	Date	Team	Score	High points	High rebounds	High assists	Location Attendance	Record
35	January 2	Charlotte	W 118–111	Jimmy Butler (52)	Jimmy Butler (12)	Jimmy Butler (6)	United Center; 21,612	17–18
36	January 4	@ Cleveland	W 106–94	Jimmy Butler (20)	Taj Gibson (7)	Jimmy Butler (8)	Quicken Loans Arena; 20,562	18–18
37	January 7	Toronto	W 123–118 (OT)	Jimmy Butler (42)	Butler, McDermott (10)	Dwyane Wade (7)	United Center; 21,195	19–18
38	January 9	Oklahoma City	L 94–109	Dwyane Wade (22)	Cristiano Felicio (11)	Jimmy Butler (7)	United Center; 21,923	19–19
39	January 10	@ Washington	L 99–101	Denzel Valentine (19)	Taj Gibson (12)	Grant, Rondo (6)	Verizon Center; 14,361	19–20
40	January 12	@ New York	L 89–104	Dwyane Wade (22)	Taj Gibson (9)	Rajon Rondo (8)	Madison Square Garden; 19,812	19–21
41	January 14	New Orleans	W 107–99	Jimmy Butler (28)	Taj Gibson (16)	Wade, Rondo (5)	United Center; 21,916	20–21
42	January 15	@ Memphis	W 108–104	Doug McDermott (31)	Butler, Gibson (8)	Jimmy Butler (6)	FedExForum; 18,119	21–21
43	January 17	Dallas	L 98–99	Jimmy Butler (24)	Jimmy Butler (9)	Jimmy Butler (12)	United Center; 21,294	21–22
44	January 20	@ Atlanta	L 93–102	Jimmy Butler (19)	Bobby Portis (7)	Rondo, Wade, Butler (3)	Philips Arena; 16,328	21–23
45	January 21	Sacramento	W 102–99	Dwyane Wade (30)	Cristiano Felicio (10)	Jimmy Butler (7)	United Center; 21,606	22–23
46	January 24	@ Orlando	W 100–92	Dwyane Wade (21)	Cristiano Felicio (10)	Jimmy Butler (4)	Amway Center; 18,846	23–23
47	January 25	Atlanta	L 114–119	Jimmy Butler (40)	Taj Gibson (10)	Rondo, Butler, Grant (4)	United Center; 21,445	23–24
48	January 27	Miami	L 88–100	Dwyane Wade (15)	Rajon Rondo (7)	Rajon Rondo (7)	United Center; 22,082	23–25
49	January 29	Philadelphia	W 121–108	Jimmy Butler (28)	Robin Lopez (10)	Rajon Rondo (10)	United Center; 21,606	24–25

February : 6–5 (home: 3–1; road: 3–4)

Game	Date	Team	Score	High points	High rebounds	High assists	Location Attendance	Record
50	February 1	@ Oklahoma City	W 128–100	Jimmy Butler (28)	Taj Gibson (8)	Dwyane Wade (7)	Chesapeake Energy Arena; 18,203	25–25
51	February 3	@ Houston	L 117–121 (OT)	Michael Carter-Williams (23)	Robin Lopez (10)	Carter-Williams, Wade (6)	Toyota Center; 18,055	25–26
52	February 6	@ Sacramento	W 112–107	Dwyane Wade (31)	Lopez, Carter-Williams, Wade (6)	Rajon Rondo (6)	Golden 1 Center; 17,608	26–26
53	February 8	@ Golden State	L 92–123	Robin Lopez (17)	Robin Lopez (10)	Rajon Rondo (8)	Oracle Arena; 19,596	26–27
54	February 10	@ Phoenix	L 97–115	Jimmy Butler (20)	Robin Lopez (7)	Jimmy Butler (6)	Talking Stick Resort Arena; 18,055	26–28
55	February 12	@ Minnesota	L 89–117	McDermott, Portis (16)	Michael Carter-Williams (7)	Carter-Williams, Rondo (6)	Target Center; 19,356	26–29
56	February 14	Toronto	W 105–94	Doug McDermott (20)	Jimmy Butler (12)	Rajon Rondo (5)	United Center; 21,220	27–29
57	February 16	Boston	W 104–103	Jimmy Butler (29)	Taj Gibson (9)	Rajon Rondo (8)	United Center; 21,866	28–29
58	February 24	Phoenix	W 128–121 (OT)	Dwyane Wade (23)	Nikola Mirotic (8)	Rondo, Butler (9)	United Center; 21,641	29–29
59	February 25	@ Cleveland	W 117–99	Dwyane Wade (20)	Jimmy Butler (10)	Butler, Wade (10)	Quicken Loans Arena; 20,562	30–29
60	February 28	Denver	L 107–125	Rondo, Wade (19)	Denzel Valentine (7)	Rajon Rondo (5)	United Center; 21,015	30–30

March : 6–9 (home: 4–4; road: 2–5)

Game	Date	Team	Score	High points	High rebounds	High assists	Location Attendance	Record
61	March 2	Golden State	W 94–87	Jimmy Butler (22)	Bobby Portis (13)	Jimmy Butler (6)	United Center; 22,253	31–30
62	March 4	L.A. Clippers	L 91–101	Jimmy Butler (16)	Portis, Mirotic (7)	Rajon Rondo (9)	United Center; 22,807	31–31
63	March 6	@ Detroit	L 95–109	Jimmy Butler (27)	Jimmy Butler (9)	Jerian Grant (9)	The Palace of Auburn Hills; 16,039	31–32
64	March 8	@ Orlando	L 91–98	Jimmy Butler (21)	Robin Lopez (9)	Jimmy Butler (9)	Amway Center; 16,063	31–33
65	March 10	Houston	L 94–115	Dwyane Wade (21)	Joffrey Lauvergne (9)	Jerian Grant (5)	United Center; 21,995	31–34
66	March 12	@ Boston	L 80–100	Lopez, Valentine (13)	Bobby Portis (8)	Rajon Rondo (6)	TD Garden; 18,624	31–35
67	March 13	@ Charlotte	W 115–109	Nikola Mirotic (24)	Nikola Mirotic (11)	Jimmy Butler (11)	Spectrum Center; 16,489	32–35
68	March 15	Memphis	L 91–98	Rajon Rondo (17)	Portis, Butler (7)	Rajon Rondo (8)	United Center; 21,583	32–36
69	March 17	@ Washington	L 107–112	Jimmy Butler (28)	Robin Lopez (12)	Rajon Rondo (10)	Verizon Center; 20,356	32–37
70	March 18	Utah	W 95–86	Jimmy Butler (23)	Denzel Valentine (12)	Jimmy Butler (7)	United Center; 21,953	33–37
71	March 21	@ Toronto	L 120–122 (OT)	Jimmy Butler (37)	Jimmy Butler (10)	Rajon Rondo (8)	Air Canada Centre; 19,800	33–38
72	March 22	Detroit	W 117–95	Nikola Mirotic (25)	Joffrey Lauvergne (7)	Jimmy Butler (12)	United Center; 21,503	34–38
73	March 24	Philadelphia	L 107–117	Jimmy Butler (36)	Bobby Portis (11)	Jimmy Butler (11)	United Center; 21,558	34–39
74	March 26	@ Milwaukee	W 109–94	Nikola Mirotic (28)	Rajon Rondo (9)	Jimmy Butler (14)	Bradley Center; 17,669	35–39
75	March 30	Cleveland	W 99–93	Nikola Mirotic (28)	Robin Lopez (11)	Rajon Rondo (15)	United Center; 22,282	36–39

April: 5–2 (home: 3–0; road: 2–2)

Game	Date	Team	Score	High points	High rebounds	High assists	Location Attendance	Record
76	April 1	Atlanta	W 106–104	Jimmy Butler (33)	Rajon Rondo (11)	Jimmy Butler (8)	United Center; 22,019	37–39
77	April 2	@ New Orleans	W 117–110	Jimmy Butler (39)	Bobby Portis (11)	Rajon Rondo (9)	Smoothie King Center; 18,306	38–39
78	April 4	@ New York	L 91–100	Jimmy Butler (26)	Nikola Mirotic (10)	Rajon Rondo (9)	Madison Square Garden; 19,812	38–40
79	April 6	@ Philadelphia	W 102–90	Nikola Mirotic (22)	Bobby Portis (11)	Jimmy Butler (10)	Wells Fargo Center; 15,177	39–40
80	April 8	@ Brooklyn	L 106–107	Jimmy Butler (33)	Robin Lopez (8)	Jerian Grant (5)	Barclays Center; 17,732	39–41
81	April 10	Orlando	W 122–75	Robin Lopez (18)	Lopez, Zipser (8)	Jerian Grant (11)	United Center; 21,545	40–41
82	April 12	Brooklyn	W 112–73	Jimmy Butler (25)	Bobby Portis (10)	Rajon Rondo (5)	United Center; 22,576	41–41

2016–17 season schedule

=== Playoffs ===
2017 playoff game log
Total: 2–4 (home: 0–3; road: 2–1)
First Round: 2–4 (home: 0–3; road: 2–1)

Game	Date	Team	Score	High points	High rebounds	High assists	Location Attendance	Series
1	April 16	@ Boston	W 106–102	Jimmy Butler (30)	Robin Lopez (11)	Rondo, Wade (6)	TD Garden; 18,624	1–0
2	April 18	@ Boston	W 111–97	Butler, Wade (22)	Rajon Rondo (9)	Rajon Rondo (14)	TD Garden; 18,624	2–0
3	April 21	Boston	L 87–104	Dwyane Wade (18)	Cristiano Felício (11)	Mirotic, Wade, Carter-Williams (3)	United Center; 21,293	2–1
4	April 23	Boston	L 95–104	Jimmy Butler (33)	Bobby Portis (8)	Jimmy Butler (9)	United Center; 21,863	2–2
5	April 26	@ Boston	L 97–108	Dwyane Wade (26)	Dwyane Wade (11)	Dwyane Wade (8)	TD Garden; 18,624	2–3
6	April 28	Boston	L 83–105	Jimmy Butler (23)	Bobby Portis (11)	Dwyane Wade (3)	United Center; 21,682	2–4

2017 playoff schedule

== Player statistics ==
Legend
GP	Games played	GS	Games started	MPG	Minutes per game
FG%	Field-goal percentage	3P%	3-point field-goal percentage	FT%	Free-throw percentage
RPG	Rebounds per game	APG	Assists per game	SPG	Steals per game
BPG	Blocks per game	PPG	Points per game

=== Regular season ===
Player	GP	GS	MPG	FG%	3P%	FT%	RPG	APG	SPG	BPG	PPG
Robin Lopez	81	81	28.0	.493	.000	.721	6.4	1.0	.2	1.4	10.4
Jimmy Butler	76	75	37.0	.455	.367	.865	6.2	5.5	1.9	.4	23.9
Nikola Mirotić	70	15	24.0	.413	.342	.773	5.5	1.1	.8	.8	10.6
Rajon Rondo	69	42	26.7	.408	.376	.600	5.1	6.7	1.4	.2	7.8
Cristiano Felício	66	0	15.8	.579		.645	4.7	.6	.4	.3	4.8
Bobby Portis	64	13	15.6	.488	.333	.661	4.6	.5	.3	.2	6.8
Jerian Grant	63	28	16.3	.425	.366	.890	1.8	1.9	.7	.1	5.9
Dwyane Wade	60	59	29.9	.434	.310	.794	4.5	3.8	1.4	.7	18.3
Denzel Valentine	57	0	17.1	.354	.351	.778	2.6	1.1	.5	.1	5.1
Taj Gibson^{†}	55	55	27.3	.521	.167	.714	6.9	1.1	.5	.9	11.6
Michael Carter-Williams	45	19	18.8	.366	.234	.753	3.4	2.5	.8	.5	6.6
Paul Zipser	44	18	19.2	.398	.333	.775	2.8	.8	.3	.4	5.5
Doug McDermott^{†}	44	4	24.5	.445	.373	.881	3.0	1.0	.3	.1	10.2
Isaiah Canaan	39	0	15.2	.364	.266	.909	1.3	.9	.6	.0	4.6
Joffrey Lauvergne^{†}	20	1	12.1	.402	.300	.600	3.4	1.0	.4	.0	4.5
Cameron Payne^{†}	11	0	12.9	.333	.324	.250	1.5	1.4	.4	.0	4.9
Anthony Morrow^{†}	9	0	9.7	.414	.429	1.000	.2	.7	.2	.0	4.6
R. J. Hunter	3	0	3.0	.000	.000		.3	.0	.0	.0	.0

=== Playoffs ===
Player	GP	GS	MPG	FG%	3P%	FT%	RPG	APG	SPG	BPG	PPG
Jimmy Butler	6	6	39.8	.426	.261	.809	7.3	4.3	1.7	.8	22.7
Dwyane Wade	6	6	31.7	.372	.353	.952	5.0	4.0	.8	1.3	15.0
Robin Lopez	6	6	27.0	.654		1.000	7.2	.8	.5	1.0	12.7
Nikola Mirotić	6	6	27.0	.340	.286	.800	5.0	1.5	.7	.5	8.7
Paul Zipser	6	0	22.7	.455	.375	1.000	3.5	.5	.2	.2	7.3
Bobby Portis	6	0	20.2	.515	.462		6.0	1.2	.5	.5	6.7
Cristiano Felício	6	0	13.7	.600		.500	4.3	.3	.5	.3	3.2
Jerian Grant	5	2	10.4	.261	.111	1.000	.8	1.0	.4	.0	3.2
Michael Carter-Williams	5	0	10.6	.400	.000	.500	.8	1.2	.4	.2	2.8
Denzel Valentine	4	0	5.5	.333	.250		2.0	.5	.0	.3	1.3
Isaiah Canaan	3	2	31.7	.500	.357	.667	1.3	1.3	1.0	.0	11.7
Anthony Morrow	3	0	9.7	.556		1.000	1.0	.7	.0	.0	4.0
Joffrey Lauvergne	3	0	8.7	.364	.000	1.000	3.0	1.7	.0	.0	4.7
Rajon Rondo	2	2	33.5	.423	.000	.500	8.5	10.0	3.5	.5	11.5
Cameron Payne	1	0	4.0	.500	1.000		1.0	.0	.0	.0	3.0

- ^{†} Denotes player spent time with another team in the season. Stats reflect time with the Bulls only.

== Transactions ==
=== Trades ===
June 17, 2016	To Chicago Bulls Spencer Dinwiddie	To Detroit Pistons Cameron Bairstow
June 22, 2016	To Chicago Bulls Robin Lopez; José Calderón; Jerian Grant	To New York Knicks Derrick Rose; Justin Holiday; 2017 2nd round-pick
July 7, 2016	To Chicago Bulls Draft rights to Albert Miralles	To Cleveland Cavaliers Mike Dunleavy Jr.
July 7, 2016	To Chicago Bulls Draft rights to Ater Majok	To Los Angeles Lakers José Calderón
October 17, 2016	To Chicago Bulls Michael Carter-Williams	To Milwaukee Bucks Tony Snell
February 23. 2017	To Chicago Bulls Cameron Payne; Joffrey Lauvergne; Anthony Morrow	To Oklahoma City Thunder Taj Gibson; Doug McDermott; 2018 2nd round-pick

=== Free agency ===
==== Additions ====
Player	Signed	Former team
Rajon Rondo	2-year contract worth $28 million	Sacramento Kings
Dwyane Wade	2-year contract worth $47.5 million	Miami Heat
Isaiah Canaan	2-year contract worth $2.2 million	Philadelphia 76ers

==== Subtractions ====
Player	Reason left	New team
Joakim Noah	4-year contract worth $72 million	New York Knicks
Pau Gasol	2-year contract worth $30 million	San Antonio Spurs
E'Twaun Moore	4-year contract worth $34 million	New Orleans Pelicans
Aaron Brooks	1-year contract worth $2.5 million	Indiana Pacers
