= 2016–17 Los Angeles Lakers season =

NBA professional basketball team season

- Head coach: Luke Walton
- General manager: Mitch Kupchak (until February 21); Rob Pelinka
- Owners: Jerry Buss family trust (primary owner being Jeanie Buss as of March 27, 2017)
- Arena: Staples Center

Results
- Record: 26–56 (.317)
- Place: Division: 4th (Pacific); Conference: 14th (Western)
- Playoff finish: Did not qualify
- Stats at Basketball Reference

Local media
- Television: Spectrum SportsNet and Spectrum Deportes
- Radio: 710 ESPN

The 2016–17 Los Angeles Lakers season was the franchise's 69th season, its 68th season in the National Basketball Association (NBA), and its 57th in Los Angeles. It was the first season without Kobe Bryant since the 1995–96 season, as he retired from the NBA in April 2016. It would also be the season where after multiple opportunities to improve upon themselves came and went, the Lakers decided to replace Jim Buss and Mitch Kupchak with former Lakers legend Magic Johnson and former sports agent Rob Pelinka on February 21, 2017, as both president of basketball operations and general manager respectively. Furthermore, it was the season where Jeanie Buss would officially be named the primary owner of the Lakers on March 27.

On the eleventh anniversary of Bryant's legendary 81–point game on January 22, 2017, the Lakers lost by 49 points to the Dallas Mavericks 122–73, marking the Los Angeles Lakers' worst loss in franchise history.

Despite not making it to the playoffs, the Lakers managed to improve nine wins with an 26–56 record on their franchise worst 17–65 record from the year before.

Following the season, D'Angelo Russell was traded to the Brooklyn Nets, Nick Young signed with the Golden State Warriors where he won a championship, and Metta World Peace retired.

Until 2024–25, this was the last time that the Lakers won on opening night.

== Draft ==
Round	Pick	Player	Position	Nationality(-ies)	College / Club
1	2	Brandon Ingram	SF	United States	Duke
2	32	Ivica Zubac	Center	Croatia; Bosnia and Herzegovina	(Serbia) Mega Leks

== Roster ==
2016–17 Los Angeles Lakers roster
Players

Pos.	No.	Player	Height	Weight	DOB	From
C	28	Tarik Black	6 ft 9 in (2.06 m)	250 lb (113 kg)	1991-11-22	Kansas
SG	3	Corey Brewer	6 ft 9 in (2.06 m)	186 lb (84 kg)	1986-03-05	Florida
SG	6	Jordan Clarkson	6 ft 5 in (1.96 m)	194 lb (88 kg)	1992-06-07	Missouri
SF	9	Luol Deng	6 ft 9 in (2.06 m)	220 lb (100 kg)	1985-04-16	Duke
PG	11	Tyler Ennis	6 ft 3 in (1.91 m)	194 lb (88 kg)	1994-08-24	Syracuse
SF	14	Brandon Ingram	6 ft 9 in (2.06 m)	190 lb (86 kg)	1997-09-02	Duke
C	20	Timofey Mozgov	7 ft 1 in (2.16 m)	275 lb (125 kg)	1986-07-16	Russia
PF	7	Larry Nance	6 ft 9 in (2.06 m)	230 lb (104 kg)	1993-01-01	Wyoming
SG	10	David Nwaba	6 ft 5 in (1.96 m)	209 lb (95 kg)	1993-01-14	Cal Poly
PF	30	Julius Randle	6 ft 9 in (2.06 m)	250 lb (113 kg)	1994-11-29	Kentucky
PF	15	Thomas Robinson	6 ft 10 in (2.08 m)	237 lb (108 kg)	1991-03-17	Kansas
PG	1	D'Angelo Russell	6 ft 5 in (1.96 m)	195 lb (88 kg)	1996-02-23	Ohio State
SF	37	Metta World Peace	6 ft 7 in (2.01 m)	260 lb (118 kg)	1979-11-13	St. John's
SG	0	Nick Young	6 ft 7 in (2.01 m)	210 lb (95 kg)	1985-06-01	USC
C	40	Ivica Zubac	7 ft 1 in (2.16 m)	240 lb (109 kg)	1997-03-18	Croatia

Coaches
Head coach
- Luke Walton
Assistant(s)
- Jud Buechler
- Mark Madsen
- Jesse Mermuys
- Theo Robertson
- Brian Shaw (Associate HC)
- Brian Keefe (assistant coach/player development)
- Clay Moser (assistant coach/basketball strategy)
- Tracy Murray (assistant coach/shooting consultant)
- Casey Owens (assistant coach/advance professional scout)

Legend
- (DP) Unsigned draft pick
- (FA) Free agent
- (S) Suspended
- (DL) On assignment to D-League affiliate
- Injured

Roster
Updated: 2017-02-28

== Standings ==
=== Division ===
Pacific Division	W	L	PCT	GB	Home	Road	Div	GP
z – Golden State Warriors	67	15	.817	–	36‍–‍5	31‍–‍10	14–2	82
x – Los Angeles Clippers	51	31	.622	16.0	29‍–‍12	22‍–‍19	10–6	82
e – Sacramento Kings	32	50	.390	35.0	17‍–‍24	15‍–‍26	7–9	82
e – Los Angeles Lakers	26	56	.317	41.0	17‍–‍24	9‍–‍32	6–10	82
e – Phoenix Suns	24	58	.293	43.0	15‍–‍26	9‍–‍32	3–13	82

=== Conference ===
Western Conference
#	Team	W	L	PCT	GB	GP
1	z – Golden State Warriors *	67	15	.817	–	82
2	y – San Antonio Spurs *	61	21	.744	6.0	82
3	x – Houston Rockets	55	27	.671	12.0	82
4	x – Los Angeles Clippers	51	31	.622	16.0	82
5	y – Utah Jazz *	51	31	.622	16.0	82
6	x – Oklahoma City Thunder	47	35	.573	20.0	82
7	x – Memphis Grizzlies	43	39	.524	24.0	82
8	x – Portland Trail Blazers	41	41	.500	26.0	82
9	e – Denver Nuggets	40	42	.488	27.0	82
10	e – New Orleans Pelicans	34	48	.415	33.0	82
11	e – Dallas Mavericks	33	49	.402	34.0	82
12	e – Sacramento Kings	32	50	.390	35.0	82
13	e – Minnesota Timberwolves	31	51	.378	36.0	82
14	e – Los Angeles Lakers	26	56	.317	41.0	82
15	e – Phoenix Suns	24	58	.293	43.0	82

== Game log ==
=== Preseason ===
2016 pre-season game log
Total: 2–6 (Home: 2–6; Road: 0–0)
Pre-season: 2–6 (home: 2–6; road: 0–0)

Game	Date	Team	Score	High points	High rebounds	High assists	Location Attendance	Record
1	October 4	Sacramento	W 103–84	Tarik Black (15)	Timofey Mozgov (9)	José Calderón (3)	Honda Center (Anaheim); 9,187	1–0
2	October 7	Denver	L 97–101	D'Angelo Russell (21)	Julius Randle (6)	D'Angelo Russell (5)	Staples Center; 16,461	1–1
3	October 9	Denver	W 124–115	D'Angelo Russell (33)	Tarik Black (5)	Julius Randle (5)	Citizens Business Bank Arena (Ontario); 8,389	2–1
4	October 11	Portland	L 106–109 (OT)	Jordan Clarkson (15)	Julius Randle (13)	Marcelinho Huertas (5)	Staples Center; 15,290	2–2
5	October 13	Sacramento	L 104–116	D'Angelo Russell (31)	Julius Randle (10)	D'Angelo Russell (11)	T-Mobile Arena (Las Vegas); 8,905	2–3
6	October 15	Golden State	L 107–112	Nick Young (17)	Julius Randle (7)	D'Angelo Russell (5)	T-Mobile Arena (Las Vegas); 13,669	2–4
7	October 19	Golden State	L 112–123	Brandon Ingram (21)	Brandon Ingram (7)	D'Angelo Russell (9)	Valley View Casino Center (San Diego); 15,821	2–5
8	October 21	Phoenix	L 94–98	D'Angelo Russell (17)	Julius Randle (8)	D'Angelo Russell (6)	Honda Center; 13,489	2–6

2016–17 season schedule

=== Regular season ===
2016–17 game log
Total: 26–56 (Home: 17–24; Road: 9–32)
October: 1–2 (home: 1–0; road: 0–2)

Game	Date	Team	Score	High points	High rebounds	High assists	Location Attendance	Record
1	October 26	Houston	W 120–114	Jordan Clarkson (25)	Timofey Mozgov (8)	Julius Randle (6)	Staples Center; 18,997	1–0
2	October 28	@ Utah	L 89–96	Lou Williams (17)	Luol Deng (12)	Lou Williams (6)	Vivint Smart Home Arena; 19,911	1–1
3	October 30	@ Oklahoma City	L 96–113	Randle, Russell (20)	Julius Randle (9)	D'Angelo Russell (5)	Chesapeake Energy Arena; 18,203	1–2

November: 9–8 (home: 5–4; road: 4–4)

Game	Date	Team	Score	High points	High rebounds	High assists	Location Attendance	Record
4	November 1	@ Indiana	L 108–115	Lou Williams (19)	Julius Randle (10)	Lou Williams (5)	Bankers Life Fieldhouse; 17,923	1–3
5	November 2	@ Atlanta	W 123–116	D'Angelo Russell (23)	Luol Deng (10)	D'Angelo Russell (8)	Philips Arena; 13,800	2–3
6	November 4	Golden State	W 117–97	Julius Randle (20)	Julius Randle (14)	Jordan Clarkson (5)	Staples Center; 18,997	3−3
7	November 6	Phoenix	W 119–108	Nick Young (22)	Timofey Mozgov (8)	Russell, Williams (6)	Staples Center; 18,997	4−3
8	November 8	Dallas	L 97–109	Jordan Clarkson (22)	Julius Randle (10)	D'Angelo Russell (7)	Staples Center; 18,997	4−4
9	November 10	@ Sacramento	W 101–91	Lou Williams (21)	Julius Randle (8)	Clarkson, Randle (5)	Golden 1 Center; 17,608	5−4
10	November 12	@ New Orleans	W 126–99	Jordan Clarkson (23)	Julius Randle (11)	Julius Randle (8)	Smoothie King Center; 17,138	6−4
11	November 13	@ Minnesota	L 99–125	Lou Williams (17)	Julius Randle (6)	Williams, Russell (4)	Target Center; 14,432	6−5
12	November 15	Brooklyn	W 125–118	D'Angelo Russell (32)	Julius Randle (14)	Julius Randle (10)	Staples Center; 18,426	7−5
13	November 18	San Antonio	L 107–116	Lou Williams (24)	Julius Randle (9)	Julius Randle (7)	Staples Center; 18,997	7−6
14	November 20	Chicago	L 110–118	Lou Williams (25)	Young, Nance Jr., Black (6)	D'Angelo Russell (7)	Staples Center; 18,997	7−7
15	November 22	Oklahoma City	W 111–109	Jordan Clarkson (18)	Calderón, Black (6)	Lou Williams (5)	Staples Center; 18,997	8−7
16	November 23	@ Golden State	L 106–149	Clarkson, Williams, Ingram (16)	Nance Jr., Deng (7)	José Calderón (7)	Oracle Arena; 19,596	8−8
17	November 25	Golden State	L 85–109	Jordan Clarkson (20)	Thomas Robinson (10)	José Calderón (6)	Staples Center; 18,997	8−9
18	November 27	Atlanta	W 109–94	Lou Williams (21)	Larry Nance Jr. (10)	Jordan Clarkson (5)	Staples Center; 18,997	9−9
19	November 29	@ New Orleans	L 88–105	Lou Williams (16)	Julius Randle (10)	José Calderón (6)	Smoothie King Center; 14,024	9−10
20	November 30	@ Chicago	W 96–90	Clarkson, Williams (18)	Julius Randle (20)	Lou Williams (5)	United Center; 21,773	10–10

December : 2–14 (home: 1–5; road: 1–9)

Game	Date	Team	Score	High points	High rebounds	High assists	Location Attendance	Record
21	December 2	@ Toronto	L 80–113	Brandon Ingram (17)	Julius Randle (8)	Lou Williams (4)	Air Canada Centre; 19,800	10–11
22	December 3	@ Memphis	L 100–103	Lou Williams (40)	Randle, Black (6)	Marcelinho Huertas (7)	FedExForum; 17,017	10–12
23	December 5	Utah	L 101–107	Lou Williams (38)	Julius Randle (11)	Lou Williams (7)	Staples Center; 18,279	10–13
24	December 7	@ Houston	L 95–134	Lou Williams (24)	Julius Randle (10)	Marcelinho Huertas (7)	Toyota Center; 16,141	10–14
25	December 9	Phoenix	L 115–119	Lou Williams (35)	Luol Deng (11)	Julius Randle (5)	Staples Center; 18,997	10–15
26	December 11	New York	L 112–118	Lou Williams (24)	Julius Randle (10)	Russell, Williams (5)	Staples Center; 18,997	10–16
27	December 12	@ Sacramento	L 92–116	D'Angelo Russell (17)	Julius Randle (8)	Russell, Deng (4)	Golden 1 Center; 17,608	10–17
28	December 14	@ Brooklyn	L 97–107	Lou Williams (16)	Timofey Mozgov (13)	Nance Jr., Russell, Deng, Williams (2)	Barclays Center; 17,732	10–18
29	December 16	@ Philadelphia	W 100–89	Julius Randle (25)	Julius Randle (9)	Deng, Williams (3)	Wells Fargo Center; 20,491	11–18
30	December 17	@ Cleveland	L 108–119	Nick Young (32)	Brandon Ingram (10)	Brandon Ingram (9)	Quicken Loans Arena; 20,562	11–19
31	December 20	@ Charlotte	L 113–117	Jordan Clarkson (25)	Luol Deng (7)	Lou Williams (8)	Spectrum Center; 19,093	11–20
32	December 22	@ Miami	L 107–115	Lou Williams (27)	Thomas Robinson (12)	D'Angelo Russell (7)	American Airlines Arena; 19,712	11–21
33	December 23	@ Orlando	L 90–109	Jordan Clarkson (18)	Thomas Robinson (11)	Huertas, Deng, Russell (3)	Amway Center; 18,846	11–22
34	December 25	LA Clippers	W 111–102	Mozgov, Young (19)	Luol Deng (12)	Julius Randle (8)	Staples Center; 18,997	12–22
35	December 27	Utah	L 100–102	Julius Randle (25)	Julius Randle (12)	D'Angelo Russell (4)	Staples Center; 18,997	12–23
36	December 29	Dallas	L 89–101	Julius Randle (18)	Thomas Robinson (10)	D'Angelo Russell (6)	Staples Center; 18,997	12–24

January : 5–10 (home: 5–4; road: 0–6)

Game	Date	Team	Score	High points	High rebounds	High assists	Location Attendance	Record
37	January 1	Toronto	L 114–123	D'Angelo Russell (28)	Black, Randle, Robinson (9)	Julius Randle (6)	Staples Center; 18,997	12–25
38	January 3	Memphis	W 116–102	Nick Young (20)	Julius Randle (14)	Julius Randle (11)	Staples Center; 18,997	13–25
39	January 5	@ Portland	L 109–118	D'Angelo Russell (22)	Julius Randle (9)	Julius Randle (5)	Moda Center; 19,403	13–26
40	January 6	Miami	W 127–100	Lou Williams (24)	Luol Deng (14)	D'Angelo Russell (5)	Staples Center; 18,997	14–26
41	January 8	Orlando	W 112–95	Julius Randle (19)	Randle, Mozgov (9)	D'Angelo Russell (7)	Staples Center; 18,997	15–26
42	January 10	Portland	L 87–108	Luol Deng (14)	Julius Randle (10)	D'Angelo Russell (6)	Staples Center; 18,483	15–27
43	January 12	@ San Antonio	L 94–134	Julius Randle (22)	Julius Randle (6)	Julius Randle (5)	AT&T Center; 18,418	15–28
44	January 14	@ LA Clippers	L 97–113	Jordan Clarkson (21)	Julius Randle (8)	Russell, Ingram (5)	Staples Center; 19,060	15–29
45	January 15	Detroit	L 97–102	Lou Williams (26)	Julius Randle (10)	Williams, Randle (4)	Staples Center; 18,997	15–30
46	January 17	Denver	L 121–127	Lou Williams (24)	Ivica Zubac (13)	Julius Randle, Lou Williams (7)	Staples Center; 18,412	15–31
47	January 20	Indiana	W 108–96	Lou Williams (27)	Tarik Black (13)	José Calderón (6)	Staples Center; 18,412	16–31
48	January 22	@ Dallas	L 73–122	Lou Williams (15)	Timofey Mozgov (8)	Julius Randle (4)	American Airlines Center; 19,484	16–32
49	January 25	@ Portland	L 98–105	Lou Williams (31)	Ivica Zubac (10)	Lou Williams (5)	Moda Center; 19,393	16–33
50	January 26	@ Utah	L 88–96	Lou Williams (20)	Ivica Zubac (10)	Jordan Clarkson (4)	Vivint Smart Home Arena; 19,911	16–34
51	January 31	Denver	W 120–116	Nick Young (23)	Tarik Black (8)	D'Angelo Russell (10)	Staples Center; 18,997	17–34

February : 2–8 (home: 0–3; road: 2–5)

Game	Date	Team	Score	High points	High rebounds	High assists	Location Attendance	Record
52	February 2	@ Washington	L 108–116	Jordan Clarkson (20)	Tarik Black (11)	D'Angelo Russell (11)	Verizon Center; 16,473	17–35
53	February 3	@ Boston	L 107–113	Lou Williams (21)	Larry Nance Jr. (11)	D'Angelo Russell (6)	TD Garden; 18,624	17–36
54	February 6	@ New York	W 121–107	Lou Williams (22)	Larry Nance Jr. (10)	D'Angelo Russell (6)	Madison Square Garden; 19,812	18–36
55	February 8	@ Detroit	L 102–121	Randle, Williams (17)	Tarik Black (10)	Russell, Ingram (5)	The Palace of Auburn Hills; 15,121	18–37
56	February 10	@ Milwaukee	W 122–114	Nick Young (26)	Julius Randle (7)	D'Angelo Russell (6)	BMO Harris Bradley Center; 16,380	19–37
57	February 14	Sacramento	L 96–97	Lou Williams (29)	Randle, Clarkson (7)	Lou Williams (5)	Staples Center; 18,997	19–38
58	February 15	@ Phoenix	L 101–137	Russell, Williams (21)	Julius Randle (10)	Larry Nance Jr. (5)	Talking Stick Resort Arena; 18,055	19–39
59	February 24	@ Oklahoma City	L 93–110	D'Angelo Russell (29)	Julius Randle (11)	D'Angelo Russell (6)	Chesapeake Energy Arena; 18,203	19–40
60	February 26	San Antonio	L 98–119	Brandon Ingram (22)	Julius Randle (12)	Julius Randle (4)	Staples Center; 18,997	19–41
61	February 28	Charlotte	L 104–109	Russell, Randle (23)	Julius Randle (18)	D'Angelo Russell (9)	Staples Center; 18,997	19–42

March : 2–12 (home: 1–8; road: 1–4)

Game	Date	Team	Score	High points	High rebounds	High assists	Location Attendance	Record
62	March 3	Boston	L 95–115	Jordan Clarkson (20)	Julius Randle (7)	Russell, Nance Jr. (4)	Staples Center; 18,997	19–43
63	March 5	New Orleans	L 97–105	Nick Young (19)	Julius Randle (12)	D'Angelo Russell (7)	Staples Center; 18,997	19–44
64	March 7	@ Dallas	L 111–122	Russell, Clarkson (22)	Julius Randle (18)	Julius Randle (10)	American Airlines Center; 20,484	19–45
65	March 9	@ Phoenix	W 122–110	D'Angelo Russell (28)	Randle, Nance Jr. (8)	Randle, Brewer (4)	Talking Stick Resort Arena; 17,552	20–45
66	March 12	Philadelphia	L 116–118	Jordan Clarkson (30)	Julius Randle (12)	D'Angelo Russell (7)	Staples Center; 18,997	20–46
67	March 13	@ Denver	L 101–129	Ivica Zubac (25)	Ivica Zubac (11)	Russell, Clarkson (3)	Pepsi Center; 17,344	20–47
68	March 15	@ Houston	L 100–139	Julius Randle (32)	Julius Randle (8)	Ingram, Clarkson (3)	Toyota Center; 18,055	20–48
69	March 17	Milwaukee	L 103–107	Jordan Clarkson (21)	Julius Randle (12)	Julius Randle (8)	Staples Center; 18,997	20–49
70	March 19	Cleveland	L 120–125	D'Angelo Russell (40)	Corey Brewer (9)	Julius Randle (7)	Staples Center; 18,997	20–50
71	March 21	LA Clippers	L 109–133	Brandon Ingram (21)	Randle, Zubac (7)	Russell, Clarkson (5)	Staples Center; 18,724	20–51
72	March 24	Minnesota	W 130–119 (OT)	Jordan Clarkson (35)	Julius Randle (12)	D'Angelo Russell (6)	Staples Center; 18,997	21–51
73	March 26	Portland	L 81–97	D'Angelo Russell (22)	Julius Randle (9)	Jordan Clarkson (6)	Staples Center; 18,698	21–52
74	March 28	Washington	L 108–119	D'Angelo Russell (28)	Larry Nance Jr. (10)	D'Angelo Russell (9)	Staples Center; 18,997	21–53
75	March 30	@ Minnesota	L 104–119	Jordan Clarkson (18)	Julius Randle (13)	Jordan Clarkson (7)	Target Center; 18,179	21–54

April : 5–2 (home: 4–0; road: 1–2)

Game	Date	Team	Score	High points	High rebounds	High assists	Location Attendance	Record
76	April 1	@ LA Clippers	L 104–115	David Nwaba (19)	Thomas Robinson (9)	D'Angelo Russell (6)	Staples Center; 19,060	21–55
77	April 2	Memphis	W 108–103	D'Angelo Russell (28)	Larry Nance Jr. (14)	D'Angelo Russell (5)	Staples Center; 18,997	22–55
78	April 5	@ San Antonio	W 102–95	Tyler Ennis (19)	Larry Nance Jr. (9)	Tyler Ennis (6)	AT&T Center; 18,418	23–55
79	April 7	Sacramento	W 98–94	Julius Randle (25)	Larry Nance Jr. (11)	Jordan Clarkson (6)	Staples Center; 18,997	24–55
80	April 9	Minnesota	W 110–109	Tyler Ennis (20)	Larry Nance Jr. (10)	Larry Nance Jr. (6)	Staples Center; 18,997	25–55
81	April 11	New Orleans	W 108–96	Metta World Peace (18)	Tarik Black (9)	Brandon Ingram (6)	Staples Center; 18,997	26–55
82	April 12	@ Golden State	L 94–109	Jordan Clarkson (17)	Larry Nance Jr. (11)	Ingram, Ennis (5)	Oracle Arena; 19,596	26–56

2016–17 season schedule

== Player statistics ==
Legend
GP	Games played	GS	Games started	MPG	Minutes per game
FG%	Field-goal percentage	3P%	3-point field-goal percentage	FT%	Free-throw percentage
RPG	Rebounds per game	APG	Assists per game	SPG	Steals per game
BPG	Blocks per game	PPG	Points per game

=== Regular season ===
Los Angeles Lakers statistics
Player	GP	GS	MPG	FG%	3P%	FT%	RPG	APG	SPG	BPG	PPG
Jordan Clarkson	82	19	29.2	.445	.329	.798	3.0	2.6	1.1	.1	14.7
Brandon Ingram	79	40	28.8	.402	.294	.621	4.0	2.1	.6	.5	9.4
Julius Randle	74	73	28.8	.488	.270	.723	8.6	3.6	.7	.5	13.2
Tarik Black	67	16	16.3	.510	.500	.752	5.1	.6	.4	.7	5.7
D'Angelo Russell	63	60	28.7	.405	.352	.782	3.5	4.8	1.4	.3	15.6
Larry Nance Jr.	63	7	22.9	.526	.278	.738	5.9	1.5	1.3	.6	7.1
Nick Young	60	60	25.9	.430	.404	.856	2.3	1.0	.6	.2	13.2
Lou Williams^{†}	58	1	24.2	.444	.385	.884	2.3	3.2	1.1	.2	18.6
Luol Deng	56	49	26.5	.387	.309	.730	5.3	1.3	.9	.4	7.6
Timofey Mozgov	54	52	20.4	.515	.000	.808	4.9	.8	.3	.6	7.4
Thomas Robinson	48	1	11.7	.536	.000	.470	4.6	.6	.5	.2	5.0
Ivica Zubac	38	11	16.0	.529	.000	.653	4.2	.8	.4	.9	7.5
Metta Sandiford-Artest	25	2	6.4	.279	.237	.625	.8	.4	.4	.1	2.3
José Calderón^{†}	24	11	12.2	.416	.353	1.000	1.8	2.1	.3	.0	3.3
Corey Brewer^{†}	24	3	14.9	.438	.208	.750	2.2	1.5	1.0	.3	5.4
Marcelinho Huertas	23	1	10.3	.368	.211	.529	1.0	2.3	.4	.1	2.7
Tyler Ennis^{†}	22	2	17.8	.451	.389	.864	1.2	2.4	.9	.1	7.7
David Nwaba	20	2	19.9	.580	.200	.641	3.2	.7	.7	.4	6.0

- ^{†} Denotes player spent time with another team in the season. Stats reflect time with the Lakers only.

== Transactions ==
=== Trades ===
July 7, 2016	To Los Angeles Lakers José Calderón; 2018 2nd round-pick 2019 2nd round-pick	To Chicago Bulls Draft rights to Ater Majok
February 21, 2017	To Los Angeles Lakers Corey Brewer; First round draft pick (2017)	To Houston Rockets Lou Williams
February 23, 2017	To Los Angeles Lakers Tyler Ennis	To Houston Rockets Marcelinho Huertas

=== Free agency ===
==== Re-signed ====
Player	Signed
Jordan Clarkson	4-year contract worth $50 million
Marcelinho Huertas	2-year contract worth $3 million
Tarik Black	2-year contract worth $12.8 million
Metta World Peace	1-year contract worth $980,431

==== Additions ====
Player	Signed	Former Team
Luol Deng	4-year contract worth $72 million	Miami Heat
Timofey Mozgov	4-year contract worth $64 million	Cleveland Cavaliers

==== Subtractions ====
Player	Reason left	New Team
Kobe Bryant	Retired	—N/a
Roy Hibbert	1-year contract worth $5 million	Charlotte Hornets
