= Udrih =

Udrih is a surname. Notable people with the surname include:

- Beno Udrih (born 1982), Slovenian basketball player and coach
- Samo Udrih (born 1979), Slovenian basketball player and coach, brother of Beno
