= Ish Smith =

American basketball player (born 1988)

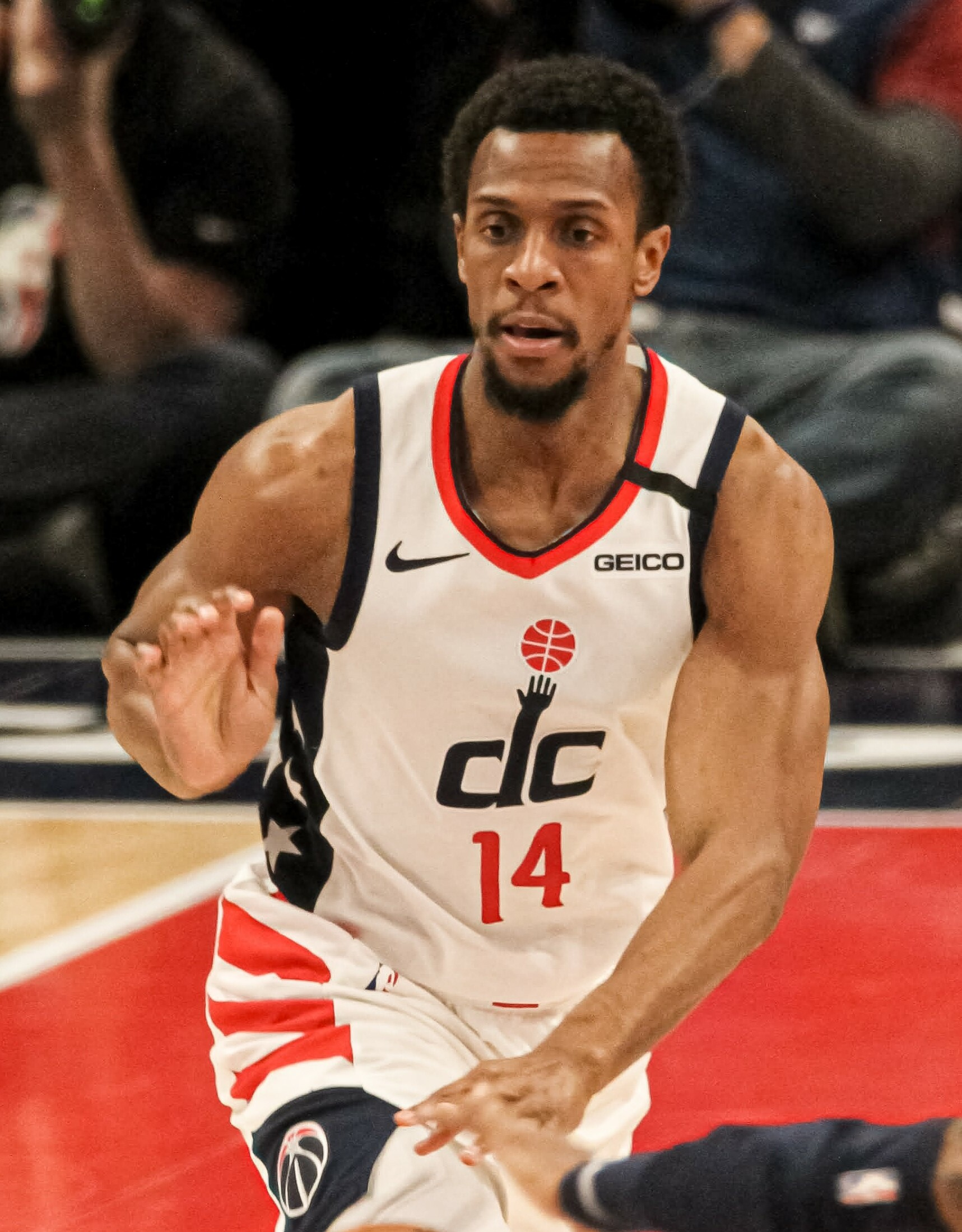
- Smith with the Washington Wizards in 2020

Washington Wizards
- Title: Scout
- League: NBA

Personal information
- Born: July 5, 1988 (age 38) Charlotte, North Carolina, U.S.
- Listed height: 6 ft 0 in (1.83 m)
- Listed weight: 175 lb (79 kg)

Career information
- High school: Central Cabarrus (Concord, North Carolina)
- College: Wake Forest (2006–2010)
- NBA draft: 2010: undrafted
- Playing career: 2010–2024
- Position: Point guard
- Number: 13, 5, 12, 10, 15, 3, 8, 4, 1, 14

Career history
- 2010–2011: Houston Rockets
- 2011: →Rio Grande Valley Vipers
- 2011: Memphis Grizzlies
- 2011–2012: Golden State Warriors
- 2012–2013: Orlando Magic
- 2013: Milwaukee Bucks
- 2013–2014: Phoenix Suns
- 2014–2015: Oklahoma City Thunder
- 2015: Philadelphia 76ers
- 2015: New Orleans Pelicans
- 2015–2016: Philadelphia 76ers
- 2016–2019: Detroit Pistons
- 2019–2021: Washington Wizards
- 2021–2022: Charlotte Hornets
- 2022: Washington Wizards
- 2022–2023: Denver Nuggets
- 2023–2024: Charlotte Hornets

Career highlights
- NBA champion (2023); Second-team All-ACC (2010)

Career NBA statistics
- Points: 5,712 (7.1 ppg)
- Rebounds: 1,920 (2.4 rpg)
- Assists: 3,044 (3.8 apg)
- Stats at NBA.com
- Stats at Basketball Reference

Ishmael Larry “Ish” Smith (born July 5, 1988) is an American former professional basketball player who is a professional scout for the Washington Wizards of the National Basketball Association (NBA). He played college basketball for the Wake Forest Demon Deacons. Smith holds the record of playing for the most NBA franchises, at 13. He won an NBA championship with the Denver Nuggets in 2023.

== High school career ==
Smith attended Central Cabarrus High School playing under Scott Brewer. He averaged 24.8 points and 9.8 assists per game as a senior and led Central Cabarrus to a 28–0 record and a MECA–6 Conference regular season and tournament title, which earned him the Meca–6 Conference Player of the Year in 2006, all-conference honors and being named Piedmont Player of the Year by The Charlotte Observer's (he also earned the last two accolades as a junior).

When he graduated, he was ranked as the No. 28 point guard in the country according to Rivals.com while being rated by Scout.com as the No. 1 point guard and the No. 2 prospect nationally.

== College career ==
Smith played college basketball for Wake Forest, finishing second all-time for assists in school history. In his four years with the Deacons he had averages of 9.2 points, 5.1 assists, 3.7 rebounds and 1.3 steals in 121 games. He also stands as the only player in school history with 1,000 points (1,114) and 600 assists (612) in his career.

As a senior, Smith averaged 13.2 points, 6.0 assists, 4.9 rebounds and 1.68 steals. He was named Second-Team All-ACC and earned Second-Team All-District honors from the NABC. Smith also received the team's Murray Greason Award and Team Assists Leader award after finishing third in the ACC and seventh nationally in assists per game in 2009–10.

== Professional career ==
=== Houston Rockets (2010–2011) ===
After going undrafted on the 2010 NBA draft, Smith signed with the Houston Rockets on August 23, 2010. On January 17, 2011, he was assigned to the Rio Grande Valley Vipers of the NBA Development League. He was recalled by the Rockets on January 24, reassigned on February 1, and recalled again on February 8 .

=== Memphis Grizzlies (2011) ===
On February 24, 2011, Smith was traded to the Memphis Grizzlies along with teammate Shane Battier in exchange for Hasheem Thabeet, DeMarre Carroll and a future first-round draft pick. Smith made 15 appearances for the Grizzlies in the 2010–11 season after the trade, all off of the bench. On December 14, 2011, Smith was waived by the Grizzlies.

=== Golden State Warriors (2011–2012) ===
On December 16, 2011, Smith was claimed off waivers by the Golden State Warriors. On December 28, he started for the Warriors in a win against the New York Knicks in place of the injured Stephen Curry, scoring 11 points, with 6 rebounds and 4 assists. Smith was later waived by the Warriors on January 13, 2012.

=== Orlando Magic (2012–2013) ===
On February 2, 2012, Smith signed with the Orlando Magic. On August 15, 2012, he re-signed with the Magic.

=== Milwaukee Bucks (2013) ===
On February 21, 2013, Smith was traded to the Milwaukee Bucks along with JJ Redick and Gustavo Ayón in exchange for Beno Udrih, Doron Lamb and Tobias Harris.

=== Phoenix Suns (2013–2014) ===
On August 29, 2013, Smith and Viacheslav Kravtsov were traded to the Phoenix Suns in exchange for Caron Butler. In his third game with the Suns, Smith dished out a career-high 8 assists in a 104–98 win over the New Orleans Pelicans. Smith matched his career-high in assists (along with 8 points, 2 rebounds and 3 steals) in a 116–100 win over the Milwaukee Bucks on January 4, 2014. Smith became one of only three Suns backups since the 1980s to collect at least two 8-assist games in less than 20 minutes of playing time in a single season; the others being Jeff Hornacek and Goran Dragić. On February 21, 2014, he scored a then-career-high 15 points in a 106–85 win over the San Antonio Spurs. On July 15, 2014, he was waived by the Suns.

=== Oklahoma City Thunder (2014–2015) ===
On July 19, 2014, Smith signed with the Houston Rockets. However, he was waived by the Rockets on October 27 after appearing in seven preseason games.

On November 7, 2014, Smith signed with the Oklahoma City Thunder to help the team deal with numerous injuries. Oklahoma City had to use an NBA hardship exemption in order to sign him as he made their roster stand at 16, one over the allowed limited of 15. After the team's hardship exemption expired, Smith was kept on the roster as the Thunder released Sebastian Telfair instead.

=== Philadelphia 76ers (2015) ===
On February 19, 2015, Smith was traded, along with the rights to Latavious Williams, cash considerations and draft considerations, to the New Orleans Pelicans in exchange for further draft considerations. He was subsequently waived by the Pelicans later that day.

On February 22, 2015, Smith signed with the Philadelphia 76ers. On March 2, 2015, he recorded career highs of 19 points and 9 assists in a loss to the Toronto Raptors. The 76ers' offensive numbers demonstrably improved after acquiring Smith as their starting point guard, and Nerlens Noel referred to Smith as "the first true point guard I've ever really played with." On March 11 and April 1, he scored a career-high 23 points. He went on to average 12.0 points and 6.1 assists in 27.1 minutes per game for the 76ers in 2014–15, all career highs.

=== New Orleans Pelicans (2015) ===
On September 25, 2015, Smith signed with the Washington Wizards. However, he was later waived by the Wizards on October 24 after appearing in five preseason games.

On October 26, Smith was claimed off waivers by the New Orleans Pelicans and made his debut for the team the following day in the season opener. In 38 minutes of action off the bench, he recorded 17 points and 9 assists in a loss to the defending champion Golden State Warriors. On November 6, he recorded 8 points and a then-career-high 11 assists in a loss to the Atlanta Hawks. Four days later, he recorded his first career double-double with 17 points and a career-high 12 assists in a 120–105 win over the Dallas Mavericks, marking the Pelicans' first win of the season. He broke his career high for assists for a third time on November 20, recording 17 points and 13 assists in a 104–90 win over the San Antonio Spurs.

=== Return to Philadelphia (2015–2016) ===
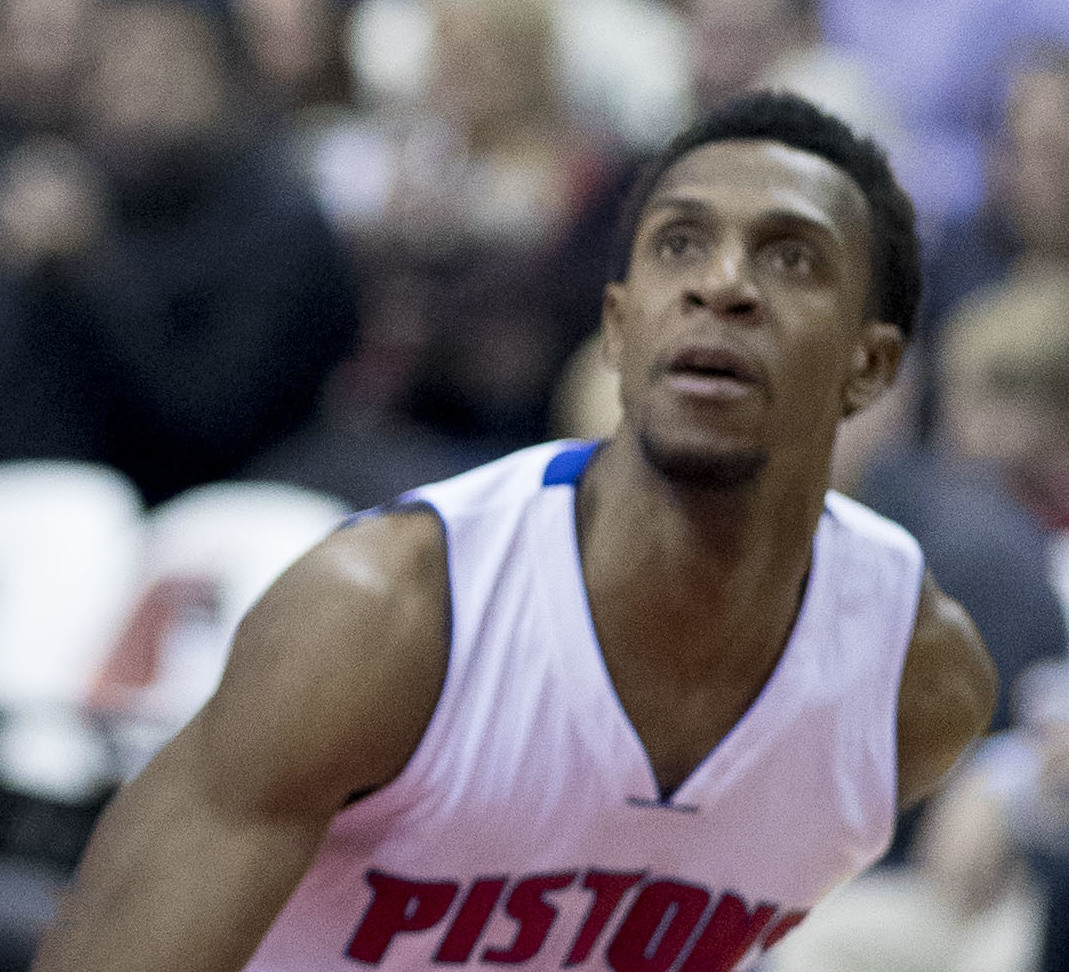
Smith with the Detroit Pistons in 2016

On December 24, 2015, Smith was traded to the Philadelphia 76ers in exchange for two future second-round draft picks. In his first game back for the 76ers two days later, he scored 14 points and helped the team record just their second win of the season with a 111–104 victory over the Phoenix Suns. On January 9, 2016, he scored a career-high 28 points in a loss to the Toronto Raptors. In that game, he scored 18 of the 76ers' 25 third-quarter points. On January 18, he recorded 16 points and a career-high 16 assists in a 119–113 double-overtime loss to the New York Knicks.

=== Detroit Pistons (2016–2019) ===
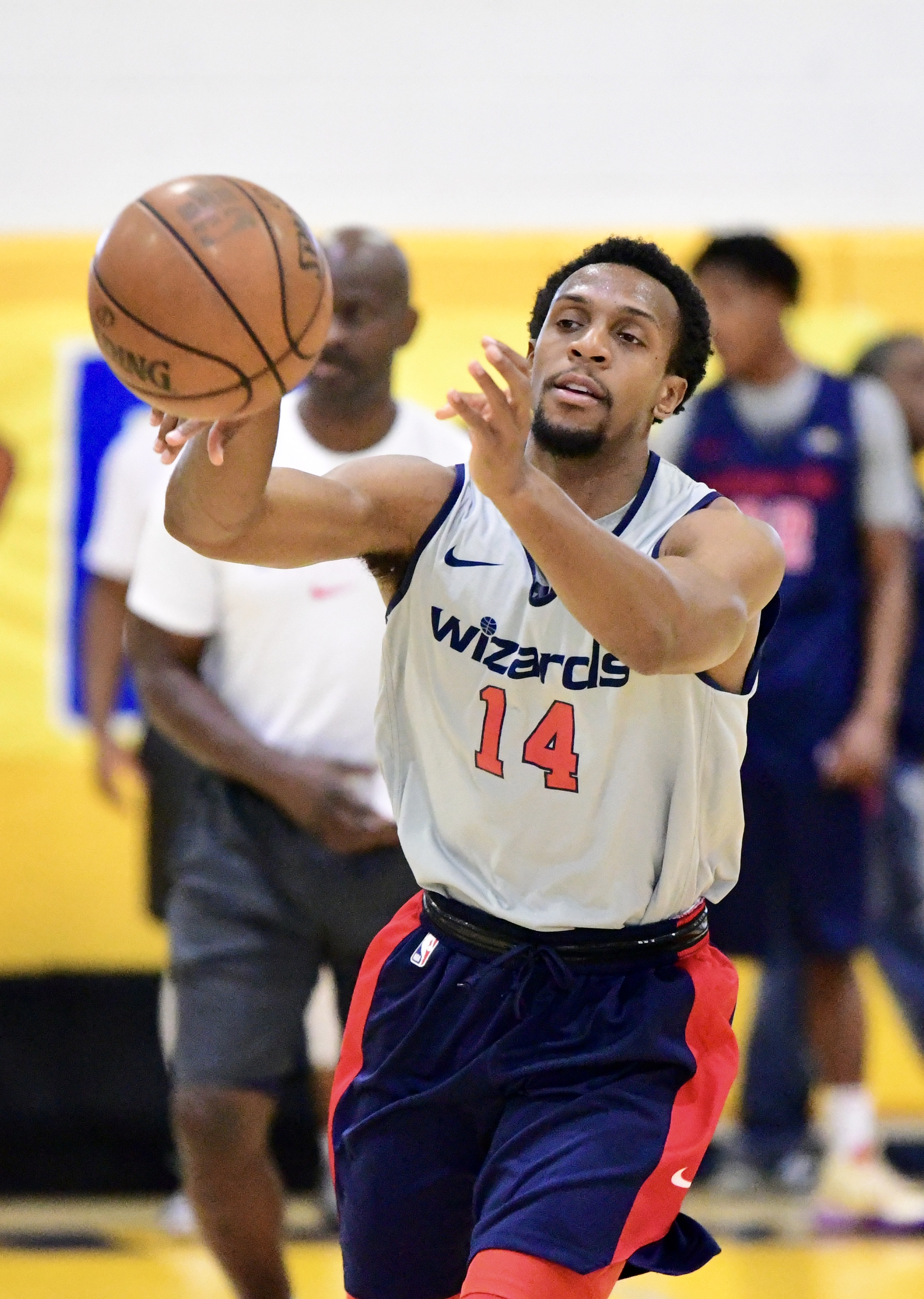
Ish Smith in October 2019

On July 8, 2016, Smith signed with the Detroit Pistons, marking the tenth team he has played for in 7 seasons. On February 23, 2017, he had 15 assists off the bench in a 114–108 overtime win over the Charlotte Hornets, becoming the first Detroit player with at least 15 assists in a reserve role since Kevin Porter had 19 in January 1977. On February 3, 2018, Smith scored 25 points in a 111–107 win over the Miami Heat. He went 11 of 14 from the field and finished three points shy of his career high—his previous season high was 19 points. On October 20, 2018, he scored all 15 of his points in the second half, including the game-winning basket, in a 118–116 win over the Chicago Bulls. On January 14, 2019, he returned to action against the Utah Jazz after missing 19 games with a torn adductor muscle. He aggravated the injury in his third game back.

=== Washington Wizards (2019–2021) ===
On July 9, 2019, Smith signed with the Washington Wizards, and played his first game with the team on October 23, 2019, scoring 7 points. This marked the 11th team that Smith played for in the previous eight seasons.

=== Charlotte Hornets (2021–2022) ===
On August 7, 2021, Smith signed with his hometown team, the Charlotte Hornets. The signing marked Smith's record-tying 12th different NBA franchise, joining Joe Smith, Chucky Brown, Jim Jackson, Kevin Ollie and Tony Massenburg as the only players to play for 12 different NBA teams.

=== Return to Washington (2022) ===
On February 10, 2022, Smith was traded back to the Washington Wizards, alongside Vernon Carey Jr., in exchange for Montrezl Harrell. This marked his second stint in Washington.

=== Denver Nuggets (2022–2023) ===
On July 6, 2022, Smith was traded, alongside Kentavious Caldwell-Pope, to the Denver Nuggets in exchange for Monté Morris and Will Barton. On October 19, 2022, Smith made his team debut. This marked the 13th NBA franchise he played for in his career, breaking the NBA record of 12 teams he shared with Chucky Brown, Jim Jackson, Tony Massenburg, and Joe Smith (no relation). Smith went on to win the NBA Finals when the Nuggets defeated the Miami Heat.

=== Return to Charlotte (2023–2024) ===
On October 24, 2023, Smith signed with the Charlotte Hornets. On February 8, 2024, he was waived by the Hornets.

== Post-playing career ==
On October 2, 2024, Smith retired from basketball to become a pro scout for the Washington Wizards.

== Career statistics ==
Legend
| GP | Games played | GS | Games started | MPG | Minutes per game |
| FG% | Field goal percentage | 3P% | 3-point field goal percentage | FT% | Free throw percentage |
| RPG | Rebounds per game | APG | Assists per game | SPG | Steals per game |
| BPG | Blocks per game | PPG | Points per game | **Bold** | Career high |
| † | Won an NBA championship | * | Led the league |

=== NBA ===
==== Regular season ====
| Year | Team | GP | GS | MPG | FG% | 3P% | FT% | RPG | APG | SPG | BPG | PPG |
|---|---|---|---|---|---|---|---|---|---|---|---|---|
| 2010–11 | Houston | 28 | 3 | 11.8 | .386 | .375 | .700 | 1.5 | 2.3 | .5 | .1 | 3.4 |
| 2010–11 | Memphis | 15 | 0 | 7.5 | .344 | .000 | .455 | .3 | 1.0 | .3 | .0 | 4.5 |
| 2011–12 | Golden State | 6 | 1 | 10.5 | .400 | .400 | .500 | 1.5 | 1.5 | .7 | .0 | 5.7 |
| 2011–12 | Orlando | 20 | 0 | 8.6 | .373 | .250 | .750 | 1.3 | 1.6 | .6 | .1 | 2.6 |
| 2012–13 | Orlando | 36 | 3 | 10.5 | .336 | .235 | .429 | 1.3 | 1.6 | .4 | .2 | 7.4 |
| 2012–13 | Milwaukee | 16 | 0 | 8.6 | .395 | .400 | – | .9 | 1.9 | .5 | .2 | 2.4 |
| 2013–14 | Phoenix | 70 | 1 | 14.4 | .423 | .043 | .564 | 1.8 | 2.6 | .7 | .2 | 3.7 |
| 2014–15 | Oklahoma City | 30 | 0 | 5.2 | .333 | .200 | .667 | .9 | .9 | .1 | .0 | 1.2 |
| 2014–15 | Philadelphia | 25 | 14 | 27.1 | .398 | .309 | .583 | 2.9 | 6.1 | **1.3** | .2 | 12.0 |
| 2015–16 | New Orleans | 27 | 3 | 22.9 | .430 | .303 | **.767** | 3.4 | 5.7 | .9 | .2 | 8.9 |
| 2015–16 | Philadelphia | 50 | **50** | **32.4** | .405 | .336 | .669 | **4.3** | **7.0** | **1.3** | .4 | **14.7** |
| 2016–17 | Detroit | 81 | 32 | 24.1 | .439 | .267 | .706 | 2.9 | 5.2 | .8 | .4 | 9.4 |
| 2017–18 | Detroit | **82*** | 35 | 24.9 | **.486** | .347 | .698 | 2.7 | 4.4 | .8 | .2 | 10.9 |
| 2018–19 | Detroit | 56 | 0 | 22.3 | .419 | .326 | .758 | 2.6 | 3.6 | .5 | .2 | 8.9 |
| 2019–20 | Washington | 68 | 23 | 26.3 | .447 | .367 | .721 | 3.2 | 4.9 | .9 | .4 | 10.9 |
| 2020–21 | Washington | 44 | 1 | 21.0 | .434 | .367 | .576 | 3.4 | 3.9 | .7 | .3 | 6.7 |
| 2021–22 | Charlotte | 37 | 1 | 13.8 | .395 | .400 | .632 | 1.5 | 2.6 | .5 | .3 | 4.5 |
| 2021–22 | Washington | 28 | 0 | 22.0 | .457 | .357 | .600 | 3.0 | 5.2 | 1.0 | **.5** | 8.6 |
| 2022–23^{†} | Denver | 43 | 0 | 9.3 | .397 | .167 | .500 | 1.3 | 2.3 | .2 | .2 | 2.5 |
| 2023–24 | Charlotte | 43 | 5 | 17.2 | .418 | **.500** | .750 | 1.8 | 3.4 | .4 | .1 | 3.2 |
| Career | | 805 | 172 | 19.2 | .429 | .325 | .676 | 2.4 | 3.8 | .7 | .2 | 7.1 |

==== Playoffs ====
| Year | Team | GP | GS | MPG | FG% | 3P% | FT% | RPG | APG | SPG | BPG | PPG |
|---|---|---|---|---|---|---|---|---|---|---|---|---|
| 2011 | Memphis | **5** | 0 | 2.0 | **.667** | — | — | .4 | .4 | .2 | .0 | .8 |
| 2012 | Orlando | 1 | 0 | 5.0 | — | — | — | 1.0 | .0 | .0 | **1.0** | .0 |
| 2013 | Milwaukee | 4 | 0 | 2.8 | .000 | — | — | .3 | .8 | .0 | .0 | .0 |
| 2019 | Detroit | 4 | 0 | 20.3 | .263 | .143 | **.750** | 2.8 | **3.5** | .8 | .3 | 6.0 |
| 2021 | Washington | **5** | 0 | **22.2** | .372 | **.286** | — | **3.2** | 2.8 | **1.4** | .4 | **6.8** |
| 2023^{†} | Denver | 4 | 0 | 2.9 | .500 | — | — | .3 | .3 | .0 | .0 | .5 |
| Career | | 23 | 0 | 10.0 | .333 | .214 | .750 | 1.4 | 1.5 | .5 | .2 | 2.8 |

=== College ===
| Year | Team | GP | GS | MPG | FG% | 3P% | FT% | RPG | APG | SPG | BPG | PPG |
|---|---|---|---|---|---|---|---|---|---|---|---|---|
| 2006–07 | Wake Forest | **31** | 30 | 29.9 | .429 | **.354** | .462 | 3.8 | **6.0** | 1.2 | .0 | 8.7 |
| 2007–08 | Wake Forest | 30 | 30 | 32.1 | .426 | .338 | .291 | 3.4 | 4.7 | 1.3 | .1 | 8.6 |
| 2008–09 | Wake Forest | 29 | 0 | 22.0 | **.430** | .241 | **.789** | 2.7 | 3.4 | .9 | .0 | 6.2 |
| 2009–10 | Wake Forest | **31** | **31** | **36.8** | .420 | .222 | .494 | **4.9** | **6.0** | **1.7** | **.6** | **13.2** |
| Career | | 121 | 91 | 30.3 | .425 | .301 | .484 | 3.7 | 5.1 | 1.3 | .2 | 9.2 |

== Personal life ==
The son of Gwen and Larry Smith, he has three siblings: two sisters and one brother. Smith is a devout Christian with a degree in religion. He reads the Bible often and prays during the national anthem before games.
