= Andre Drummond =

American basketball player (born 1993)

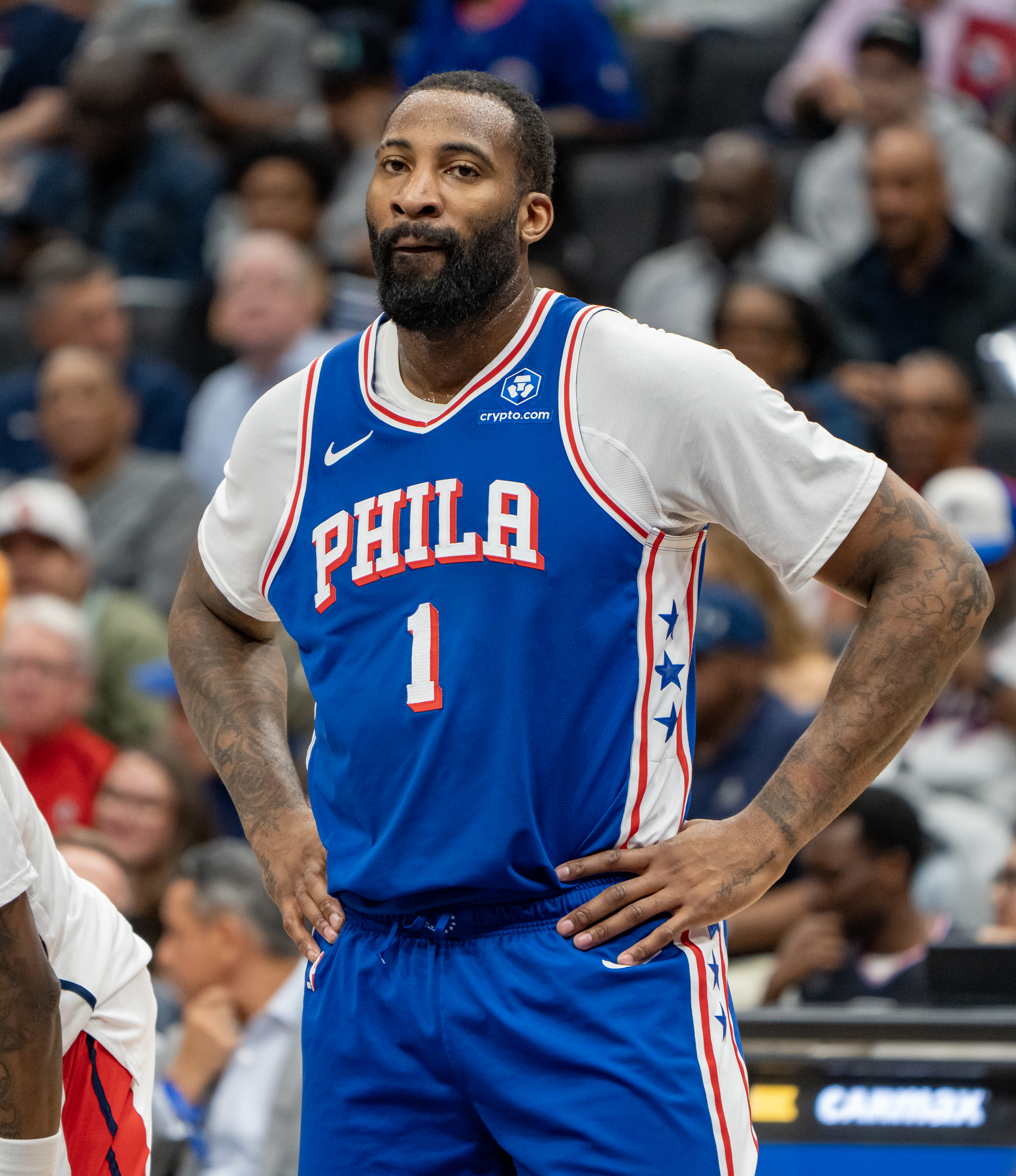
- Drummond with the Philadelphia 76ers in 2026

No. 0 – New York Knicks
- Position: Center
- League: NBA

Personal information
- Born: August 10, 1993 (age 33) Mount Vernon, New York, U.S.
- Listed height: 6 ft 10 in (2.08 m)
- Listed weight: 279 lb (127 kg)

Career information
- High school: Capital Prep Magnet (Hartford, Connecticut); St. Thomas More (Oakdale, Connecticut)
- College: UConn (2011–2012)
- NBA draft: 2012: 1st round, 9th overall pick
- Drafted by: Detroit Pistons
- Playing career: 2012–present

Career history
- 2012–2020: Detroit Pistons
- 2020–2021: Cleveland Cavaliers
- 2021: Los Angeles Lakers
- 2021–2022: Philadelphia 76ers
- 2022: Brooklyn Nets
- 2022–2024: Chicago Bulls
- 2024–2026: Philadelphia 76ers
- 2026–present: New York Knicks

Career highlights
- 2× NBA All-Star (2016, 2018); All-NBA Third Team (2016); 4× NBA rebounding leader (2016, 2018–2020); NBA All-Rookie Second Team (2013); Big East All-Freshman Team (2012)
- Stats at NBA.com
- Stats at Basketball Reference
Medals
Men's basketball
Representing the United States
FIBA World Cup
Gold medal – first place	2014 Spain	Team
FIBA World U17 Championship
Gold medal – first place	2010 Hamburg	Team
FIBA Americas U16 Championship
Gold medal – first place	2009 Mendoza	Team

Andre Jamal Drummond (born August 10, 1993) is an American professional basketball player for the New York Knicks of the National Basketball Association (NBA). A center, he was selected by the Detroit Pistons in the first round of the 2012 NBA draft with the ninth overall pick.

Drummond was one of the top-rated basketball players in the high school class of 2011 and played one season of college basketball with the Connecticut Huskies before declaring for the draft. He was named to the NBA All-Rookie Second Team with Detroit in 2013, and was named an All-Star for the first time in 2016. He was traded to the Cleveland Cavaliers in 2020. After reaching a buyout agreement with Cleveland in 2021, he joined the Los Angeles Lakers for the remainder of the 2020–21 season. Drummond has also played for the Brooklyn Nets, Philadelphia 76ers and Chicago Bulls. Drummond has perennially been among the league leaders in rebounding. He was a member of the 2014 U.S. national team that won a gold medal in the FIBA Basketball World Cup.

== Early life ==
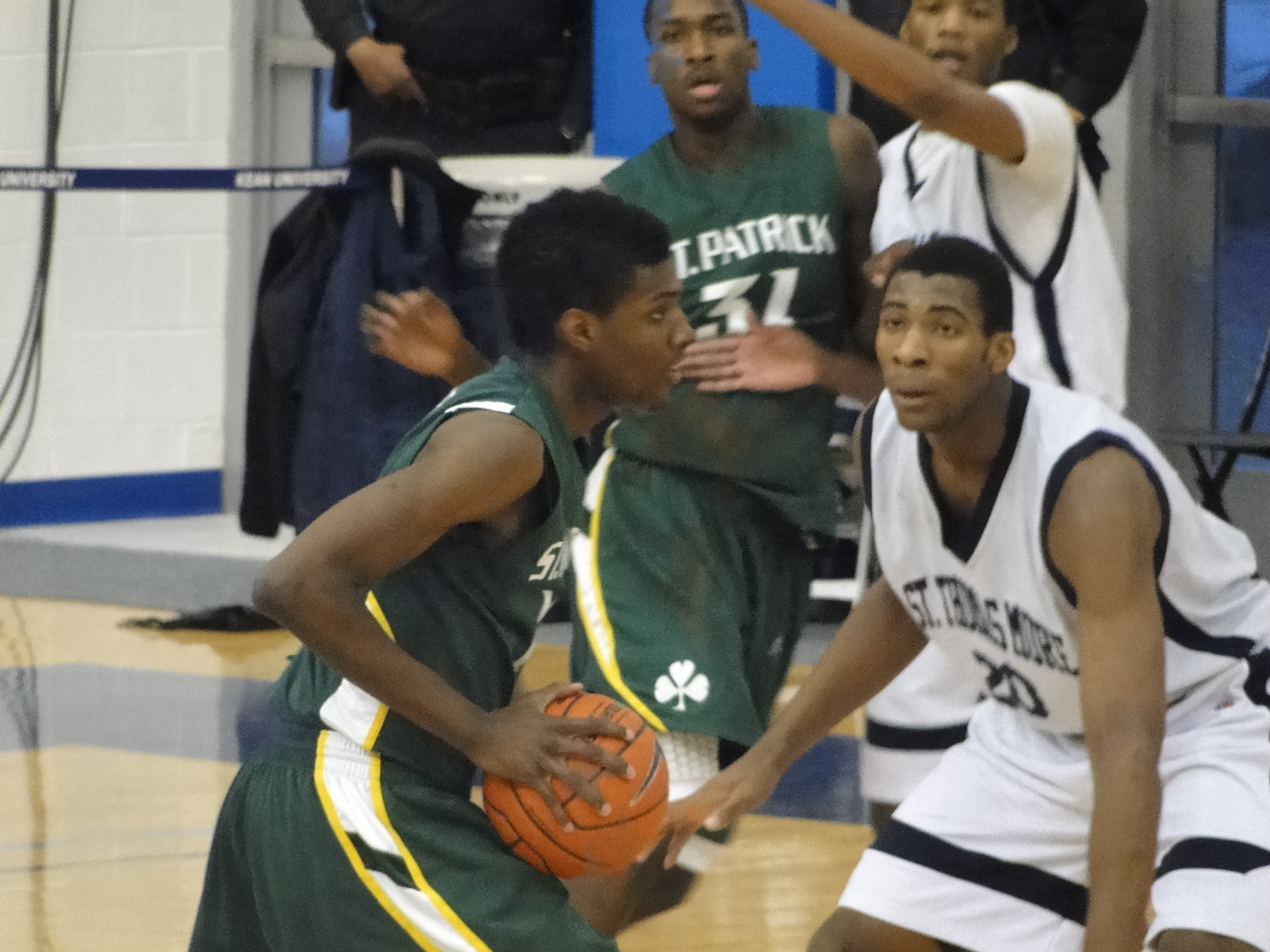
Drummond (right) as a high school player in 2010

Born in Mount Vernon, New York, in 1993 to Jamaican parents, Drummond moved to Middletown, Connecticut, as a 7-year-old with his mother and sister, then went to Woodrow Wilson Middle School before starting high school at Capital Preparatory Magnet School in Hartford. During his freshman year, he averaged 12.7 points, 11.9 rebounds and 6.5 blocks per game. He improved during his sophomore year at Capital Prep, averaging 20.2 points, 16.6 rebounds, 7.2 blocks and 4.5 steals per game. After two years at Capital Preparatory Magnet School, he transferred to St. Thomas More in Oakdale, where he reclassified and repeated his sophomore year as he recovered from a stress fracture in his foot. At St. Thomas More, Drummond was one of the most dominating centers in high school basketball. He spent two years at St. Thomas More and led the team to the national prep championship in 2011, alongside future NBA player Damion Lee. He graduated in the spring that year.

Drummond was rated as the No. 1 player in the class of 2011 by ESPN and NBADraft.net, while being ranked No. 2 player by Rivals.com and Scout.com. In the summer of 2010, Drummond was a member of the gold medal-winning United States team at the 2010 FIBA Under-17 World Championship. He helped lead team USA to a 111–80 victory over Poland in the gold medal game.

== College career ==
Drummond initially declared he would spend a postgraduate year at Wilbraham & Monson Academy in 2011–12. Two weeks later on August 26, 2011, he announced via Twitter that instead he intended to reclassify again and attend the University of Connecticut. According to ESPN, the decision "created a media frenzy due to the sheer surprise." Drummond had also been considering attending Kentucky, Louisville, Georgetown, or West Virginia.

Drummond appeared in 34 games as a freshman at UConn, starting 30 times. He averaged 28.4 minutes of playing time per game, during which he scored 10.0 points and grabbed 7.6 rebounds. He led the team in rebounds per game, blocks per game (2.7) and field goal percentage (.538). He scored 20-plus points in two games during the season, including a 24-point performance against Holy Cross, in which he shot 11-of-12 from the field. Drummond's collegiate career ended in the first round of the NCAA tournament, as the ninth-seeded Huskies fell to eighth-seeded Iowa State. The freshman center scored two points before fouling out in 26 minutes. A month later, Drummond announced his decision to enter the 2012 NBA draft.

== Professional career ==
=== Detroit Pistons (2012–2020) ===
==== 2012–15: Rookie season and first double-double seasons ====
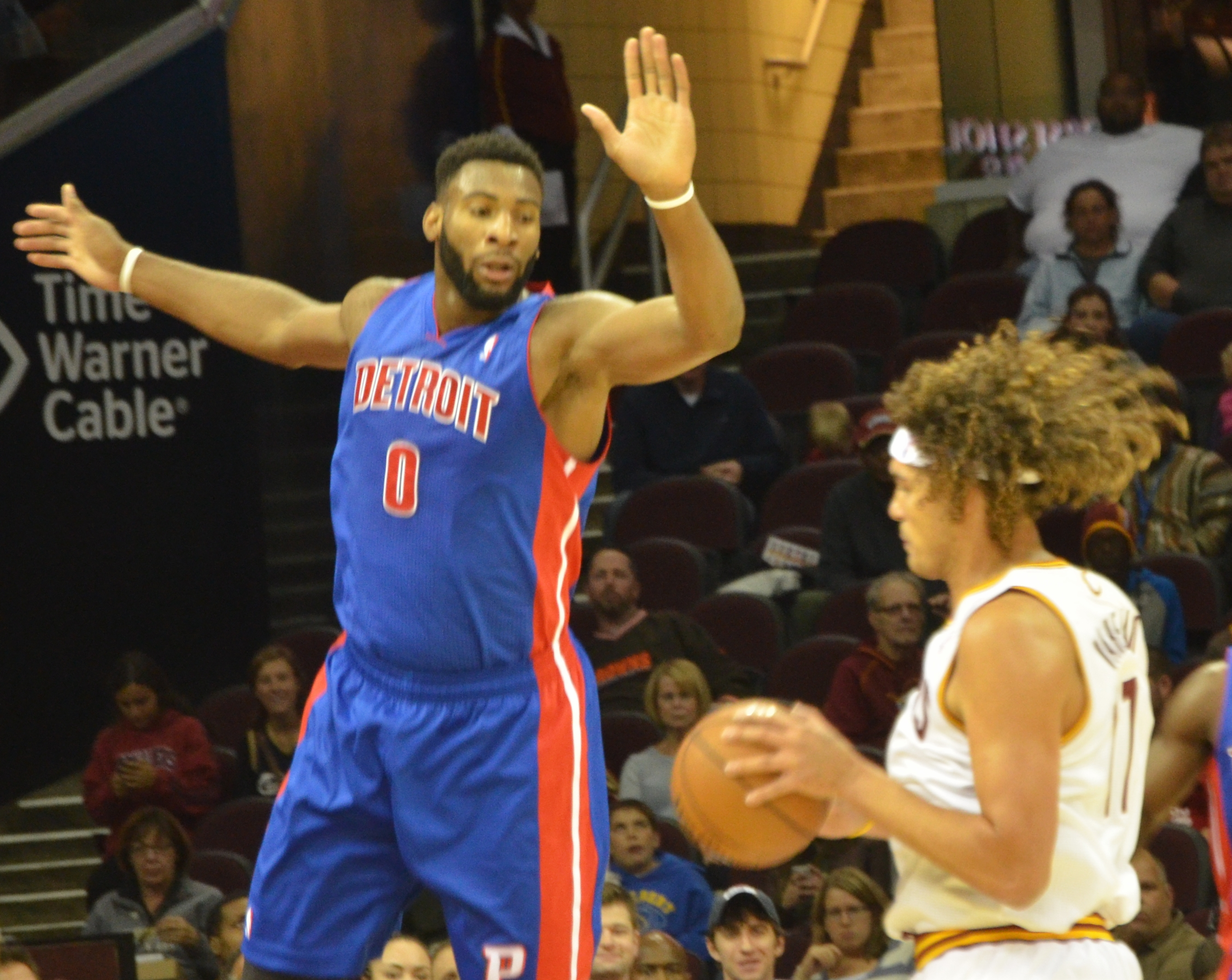
Drummond defending Anderson Varejão in October 2013

Drummond was selected by the Detroit Pistons with the ninth overall pick in the 2012 NBA draft. In his rookie season, Drummond averaged 7.9 points, 7.6 rebounds, 1.0 steal and 1.6 blocks in 20.7 minutes per game. On May 14, 2013, he was named to the 2012–13 NBA All-Rookie Second Team. He also finished fourth in NBA Rookie of the Year voting.

On January 24, 2014, Drummond recorded a then-career-high 20 rebounds to go with 20 points in a loss to the New Orleans Pelicans. On February 14, Drummond scored 30 points and an NBA Rising Stars Challenge record 25 rebounds, and was named the MVP of the event. On March 3, Drummond recorded 17 points and a then-career-high 26 rebounds in a win over the New York Knicks.

On March 11, 2015, Drummond recorded 22 points and a season-high 25 rebounds in a loss to the Golden State Warriors. This was Drummond's fourth 20-point, 20-rebound game over the previous two seasons, the most in the NBA in that time span. On March 29, Drummond recorded a then-career-high 32 points in a loss to the Miami Heat.

==== 2015–17: First All-Star selection and rebounding title ====
Drummond recorded double-doubles in each of the Pistons' first three games of the 2015–16 season, helping lead the team to an NBA-tying-best 3–0 record for the first time since the 2008–09 season. He became the first Pistons player to record three consecutive double-doubles to start the season since Ben Wallace in 2004–05. He was subsequently named the Eastern Conference Player of the Week for the first week of the season, becoming the first Piston to win the award since Rodney Stuckey did so in December 2009. On November 3, Drummond recorded 25 points and a career-high 29 rebounds in a loss to the Indiana Pacers, becoming the first Piston with back-to-back 20/20 games since 1985. On November 8, he recorded 29 points and 27 rebounds in a win over the Portland Trail Blazers, joining Kareem Abdul-Jabbar and Wilt Chamberlain as the only players with three 20/20 games in the first six games of a season. He was subsequently named the Eastern Conference Player of the Week for the second week of the season, becoming the first Piston to win player of the week in consecutive weeks, and the first player to win the award in the first two weeks of the season since LeBron James in 2011–12. On November 21, Drummond's streak of 11 consecutive double-doubles to begin the season came to an end. This was the longest streak by a Piston since Dave DeBusschere recorded 13 consecutive double-doubles in 1966–67. On December 18, Drummond recorded 21 rebounds and a career-high 33 points in a 147–144 quadruple-overtime win over the Chicago Bulls. He became the first Pistons player with at least 30 points and 20 rebounds in a game since Dennis Rodman in 1990–91.

On January 20, 2016, Drummond set an NBA record for free throws missed in a game with 23, surpassing the previous record of 22 set by Wilt Chamberlain on December 1, 1967. He also set a career high and franchise record by attempting 36 free throws. On January 28, Drummond earned his first NBA All-Star Game selection as a reserve for the Eastern Conference in the 2016 NBA All-Star Game. During the All-Star weekend, he also participated in the Slam Dunk Contest. On February 27, he recorded his league-leading 50th double-double of the season with 15 points and 17 rebounds in a 102–91 win over the Milwaukee Bucks. On March 2, Drummond recorded nine points and 14 rebounds against the San Antonio Spurs, ending his career high and the league's season high of consecutive double-doubles at 13 straight. The Pistons finished the regular season as the eighth seed in the Eastern Conference with a 44–38 record, earning a playoff berth for the first time since 2009. They went on to be swept in their first-round match-up against the eventual NBA champions, the Cleveland Cavaliers, in a highly competitive series.

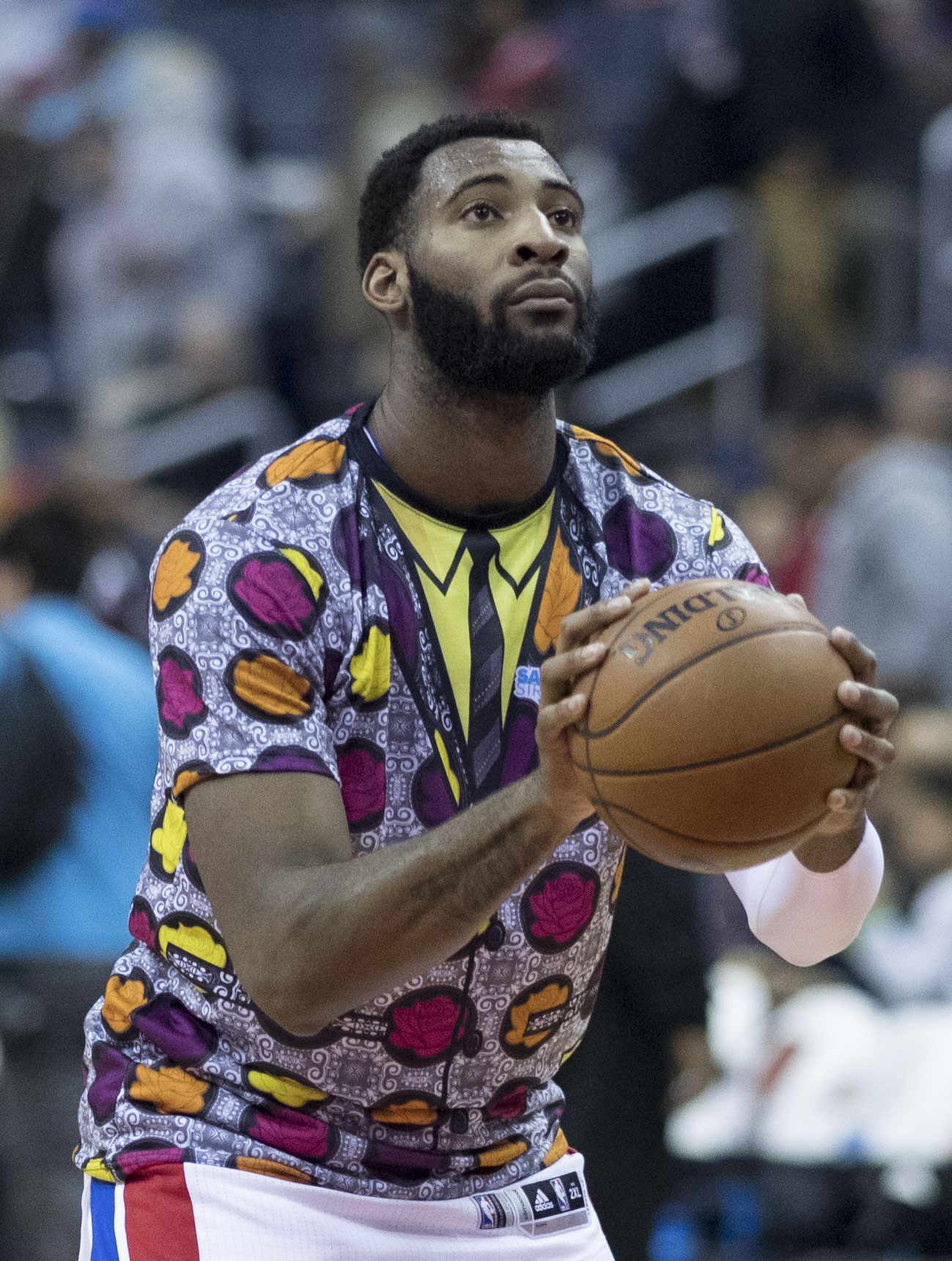
Drummond with the Pistons in 2016

On July 15, 2016, Drummond re-signed with the Pistons on a five-year, $130 million contract. On October 30, he recorded 20 points and 23 rebounds in a 98–83 win over the Milwaukee Bucks, setting his 10th career game with at least 20 points and 20 rebounds. With 20 points and 17 rebounds on November 19 against the Boston Celtics, Drummond reached 4,000 career rebounds. At 23 years and 101 days, he became the second-youngest player to reach the milestone, trailing only Dwight Howard (22 years, 129 days). On December 7, he recorded a season-high 26 points and 20 rebounds in an 87–77 loss to the Charlotte Hornets. On March 17, 2017, he grabbed 22 rebounds in an 87–75 loss to the Toronto Raptors. It was the 34th time he had 20 rebounds in a game, including seven in 2016–17.

==== 2017–20: Second All-Star selection and consecutive rebounding titles ====
On October 23, 2017, Drummond recorded 14 points and 14 rebounds in a 97–86 loss to the Philadelphia 76ers. He moved into sixth place on Detroit's career rebounding list, passing Walter Dukes. Two days later, in a 122–101 win over the Minnesota Timberwolves, Drummond recorded his 5,000th career rebound in the first quarter, becoming the sixth Pistons player to reach that total. At 24 years, 76 days, he became the second-youngest player to reach the milestone, trailing only Dwight Howard (23 years, 112 days). On November 10, he recorded 16 points, 20 rebounds and a then-career-high seven assists in a 111–104 win over the Atlanta Hawks, moving the Pistons to a 9–3 record—their best start to a season since the 2005–06 season. Drummond went on to become the first player to grab at least 200 rebounds in the first 13 games of two different seasons since Dennis Rodman did it three times for three different teams in the 1990s. On November 27, he recorded season highs of 26 points and 22 rebounds in a 118–108 win over the Boston Celtics. He also had six assists and four steals, becoming the first player with that many points, rebounds, assists and steals since Charles Barkley in January 1990.

On December 14, Drummond recorded 12 points, 19 rebounds and a career-high eight assists in a 105–91 win over the Atlanta Hawks. On January 24, Drummond recorded 30 points, 24 rebounds, six blocked shots, four assists and three steals in a 98–95 overtime loss to the Utah Jazz. He became the first player to record such stats in a game since 1973–74, when the NBA first began to record blocks and steals. During the game, Drummond reached 2,000 offensive rebounds for his career, becoming the youngest player to reach the milestone at 24 years, 167 days, surpassing the previous record held by Howard at 25 years, 86 days. On January 30, he was named as a replacement for John Wall in the 2018 NBA All-Star Game. On February 3, he recorded 23 points, 20 rebounds, four steals and four blocks in a 111–107 win over the Miami Heat. Drummond had at least 20 points and 20 rebounds for the sixth time in 2017–18 and became the first player with at least 20 points, 20 rebounds, four steals and four blocks since Hakeem Olajuwon on December 22, 1989. Four days later, he recorded 17 points and a season-high 27 rebounds in a 115–106 win over the Brooklyn Nets. On March 29, he recorded 24 points and 23 rebounds in a 103–92 win over the Washington Wizards. It was his 20th 20/20 game of his career, the most of any NBA player since he joined the league in 2012. Drummond concluded the regular season averaging 16 rebounds per game, becoming the first player since Rodman in 1997 to average 16 rebounds per game in a season and only the second player in the last 40 years.

On November 5, 2018, Drummond recorded 25 points and 24 rebounds in a 120–115 overtime loss to the Miami Heat. On January 31, Drummond recorded 24 points and 20 rebounds in a 93–89 victory over the Dallas Mavericks. During the game, he became the Pistons' all-time career leader in offensive rebounds with 2,431, surpassing the previous record held by Bill Laimbeer. On February 8, he had his ninth 20/20 game of the season with 29 points and 20 rebounds in a 120–103 win over the New York Knicks.

On February 11, Drummond scored a season-high 32 points against the Washington Wizards. On March 8, he recorded 20 points and 24 rebounds, including 14 points and 18 rebounds in the second half, to help the Pistons overcome a 21-point deficit in a 112–104 victory over the Chicago Bulls. This was Drummond's league-leading 11th 20/20 game of the season. He was subsequently named the Eastern Conference Player of the Week. He averaged 22.3 points (67% FG), 18.0 rebounds, 2.0 assists, 1.3 blocks and 1.3 steals per game in three games. On March 11 against the Brooklyn Nets, Drummond's 19th straight double-double tied him with Bob Lanier (1974–75) for the longest such streak in Pistons' team history. His streak was snapped two days later when he had five points and nine rebounds against the Heat. Later that month, he reached 1,000 points, 1,000 rebounds, 100 blocks and 100 steals for the fourth season of his career, the most in NBA history since steals and blocks were first recorded in the 1973–74 season. In April, he broke his own single-season franchise record with his 67th double-double.

Drummond began the 2019–20 season with 32 points and 23 rebounds in a win over the Indiana Pacers, joining Charles Barkley (1992) and George McGinnis (1977) as the only players with a 30-point and 20-rebound game in the season-opener since the merger.

=== Cleveland Cavaliers (2020–2021) ===
On February 6, 2020, the Pistons traded Drummond to the Cleveland Cavaliers, in exchange for Brandon Knight, John Henson and a 2023 second-round draft pick. On March 26, 2021, the Cavaliers reached a buy-out with Drummond.

=== Los Angeles Lakers (2021) ===
On March 28, 2021, Drummond signed a 1-year contract worth $794,536 with the Los Angeles Lakers, adding an offensive boost to a team without injured stars LeBron James and Anthony Davis. With the Lakers, he played 21 games—all starts—and averaged 11.9 points, 10.2 rebounds and 1.4 assists in 24 minutes per game. Although healthy, he did not play in Game 6 in the first round of the playoffs against the Phoenix Suns, when the Lakers were eliminated 4–2.

=== Philadelphia 76ers (2021–2022) ===
On August 4, 2021, Drummond signed a one-year contract worth $2.4 million veteran's minimum contract with the Philadelphia 76ers.

=== Brooklyn Nets (2022) ===
On February 10, 2022, Drummond was traded by Philadelphia, along with Ben Simmons, Seth Curry and two future first-round picks, to the Brooklyn Nets in exchange for James Harden and Paul Millsap. On February 14, in his debut for the Nets, Drummond recorded 11 points and nine rebounds in a 109–85 win against the Sacramento Kings to help his new team end an 11-game losing streak. On February 23, Drummond changed his number from 4 to 0 since Jevon Carter was waived.

=== Chicago Bulls (2022–2024) ===
On July 6, 2022, Drummond signed a two-year, $6.6 million contract with the Chicago Bulls.

On June 29, 2023, Drummond exercised his player option with the Bulls.

On November 6, 2023, in a game against the Utah Jazz, Drummond recorded his 10,000th career rebound. On December 26, Drummond started in place of an injured Nikola Vučević and recorded 24 points and 25 rebounds as the Bulls defeated the Atlanta Hawks 118–113.

On February 8, 2024, the NBA fined Drummond for an inappropriate gesture.

=== Philadelphia 76ers (2024–2026) ===
On July 7, 2024, Drummond signed a two-year, $10 million contract to return to the Philadelphia 76ers. On March 3, 2025, Drummond recorded 25 points and 18 rebounds in a 102–119 loss to the Portland Trail Blazers.

=== New York Knicks (2026–present) ===
On July 6, 2026, Drummond signed a one-year minimum contract with the New York Knicks. He made his Knicks debut on October 20, recording a double-double of 12 points and 14 rebounds to go with four assists and two blocks in a 106–100 loss to the Philadelphia 76ers.

== National team career ==
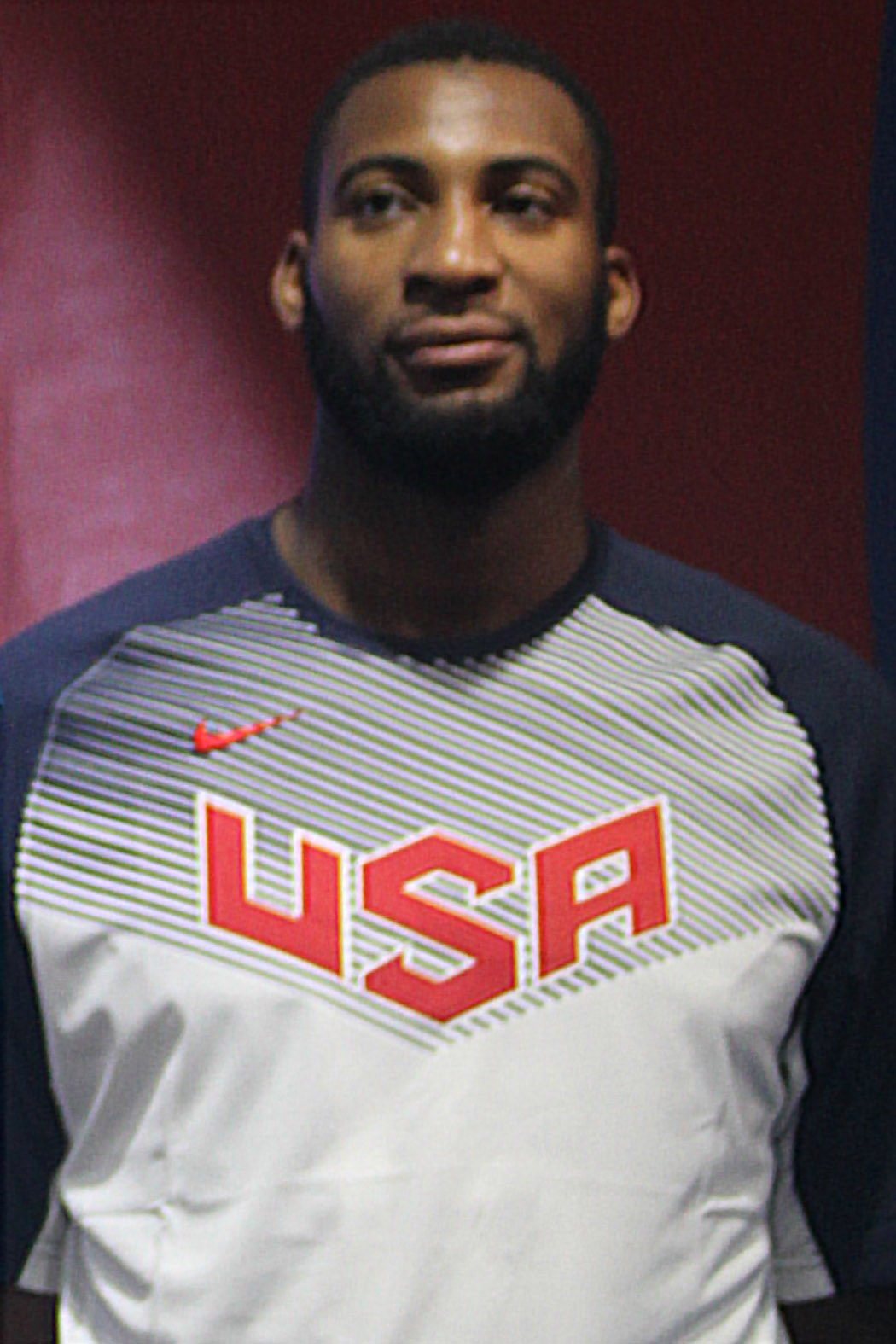
Drummond with Team USA at the 2014 World Basketball Festival

Drummond was a member of the 2014 U.S. national team that won the gold medal at the FIBA Basketball World Cup. Over the span of the tournament, he averaged 3.0 points and 2.5 rebounds in eight games.

== Personal life ==
Drummond has three children, two daughters and a son. Drummond briefly dated American writer and former actress Jennette McCurdy during his rookie year.

He has been an Ambassador for Special Olympics since 2016. Andre has started and funded a music development program for person with disabilities in conjunction with the Berklee College of Music of Massachusetts. The initial phase of the program began in 2025 in Middletown, Connecticut. The program, known as "Team Andre" trains persons to give the required specialized instruction to persons with physical and mental disabilities to teach them to play a variety of instruments and later to become involved with musical groups of sorts.

== Career statistics ==
Legend
GP	Games played	GS	Games started	MPG	Minutes per game
FG%	Field goal percentage	3P%	3-point field goal percentage	FT%	Free throw percentage
RPG	Rebounds per game	APG	Assists per game	SPG	Steals per game
BPG	Blocks per game	PPG	Points per game	**Bold**	Career high
*	Led the league

=== NBA ===
==== Regular season ====
Year	Team	GP	GS	MPG	FG%	3P%	FT%	RPG	APG	SPG	BPG	PPG
2012–13	Detroit	60	10	20.7	.608	**.500**	.371	7.6	.5	1.0	1.6	7.9
2013–14	Detroit	81	81	32.3	**.623**	.000	.418	13.2	.4	1.2	1.6	13.5
2014–15	Detroit	**82**	**82***	30.5	.514	.000	.389	13.5	.7	.9	**1.9**	13.8
2015–16	Detroit	81	81	32.9	.521	.333	.355	14.8*	.8	1.5	1.4	16.2
2016–17	Detroit	81	81	29.7	.530	.286	.386	13.8	1.1	1.5	1.1	13.6
2017–18	Detroit	78	78	**33.7**	.529	.000	.605	**16.0***	**3.0**	1.5	1.6	15.0
2018–19	Detroit	79	79	33.5	.533	.132	.590	15.6*	1.4	1.7	1.7	17.3
2019–20	Detroit	49	48	**33.7**	.530	.048	.584	15.8*	2.8	**2.0**	1.7	**17.8**
2019–20	Cleveland	8	8	28.1	.552	.286	.513	11.1*	1.8	1.5	1.4	17.5
2020–21	Cleveland	25	25	28.9	.474	.000	.597	13.5	2.6	1.6	1.2	17.5
2020–21	L.A. Lakers	21	21	24.8	.531	—	.605	10.2	1.4	1.1	1.0	11.9
2021–22	Philadelphia	49	12	18.4	.538	.000	.512	8.8	2.0	1.1	.9	6.1
2021–22	Brooklyn	24	24	22.3	.610	.000	.537	10.3	1.4	.9	1.0	11.8
2022–23	Chicago	67	0	12.7	.606	.000	.536	6.6	.5	.7	.4	6.0
2023–24	Chicago	79	10	17.1	.556	.000	.592	9.0	.5	.9	.6	8.4
2024–25	Philadelphia	40	23	18.8	.500	.150	.622	7.8	.9	1.0	.5	7.3
2025–26	Philadelphia	63	25	19.5	.472	.356	**.631**	8.4	1.3	.6	.8	6.4
Career		967	688	26.3	.539	.217	.489	11.9	1.2	1.2	1.2	12.1
All-Star		2	0	18.0	.833	.000	—	8.0	.0	1.0	.5	15.0

==== Playoffs ====
Year	Team	GP	GS	MPG	FG%	3P%	FT%	RPG	APG	SPG	BPG	PPG
2016	Detroit	4	4	**32.8**	.519	.000	.324	9.0	.0	.3	**1.5**	**16.8**
2019	Detroit	4	4	31.8	.444	.000	.429	**13.0**	**2.3**	**1.5**	1.3	14.3
2021	L.A. Lakers	5	**5**	21.0	.594	—	**.700**	11.0	.0	.8	.6	9.0
2022	Brooklyn	4	4	15.0	.545	—	.600	3.0	.8	1.3	.8	3.8
2026	Philadelphia	**11**	1	12.9	**.696**	**.500**	**.700**	4.3	.6	.4	.2	3.9
Career		28	18	20.2	.534	.400	.463	7.2	.7	.7	.7	8.1

=== College ===
Year	Team	GP	GS	MPG	FG%	3P%	FT%	RPG	APG	SPG	BPG	PPG
2011–12	Connecticut	34	30	28.4	.538	.000	.295	7.6	.4	.8	2.7	10.0

== See also ==
- List of NBA career rebounding leaders
- List of NBA career field goal percentage leaders
- List of NBA single-season rebounding leaders
