= Tobias Harris =

American basketball player (born 1992)

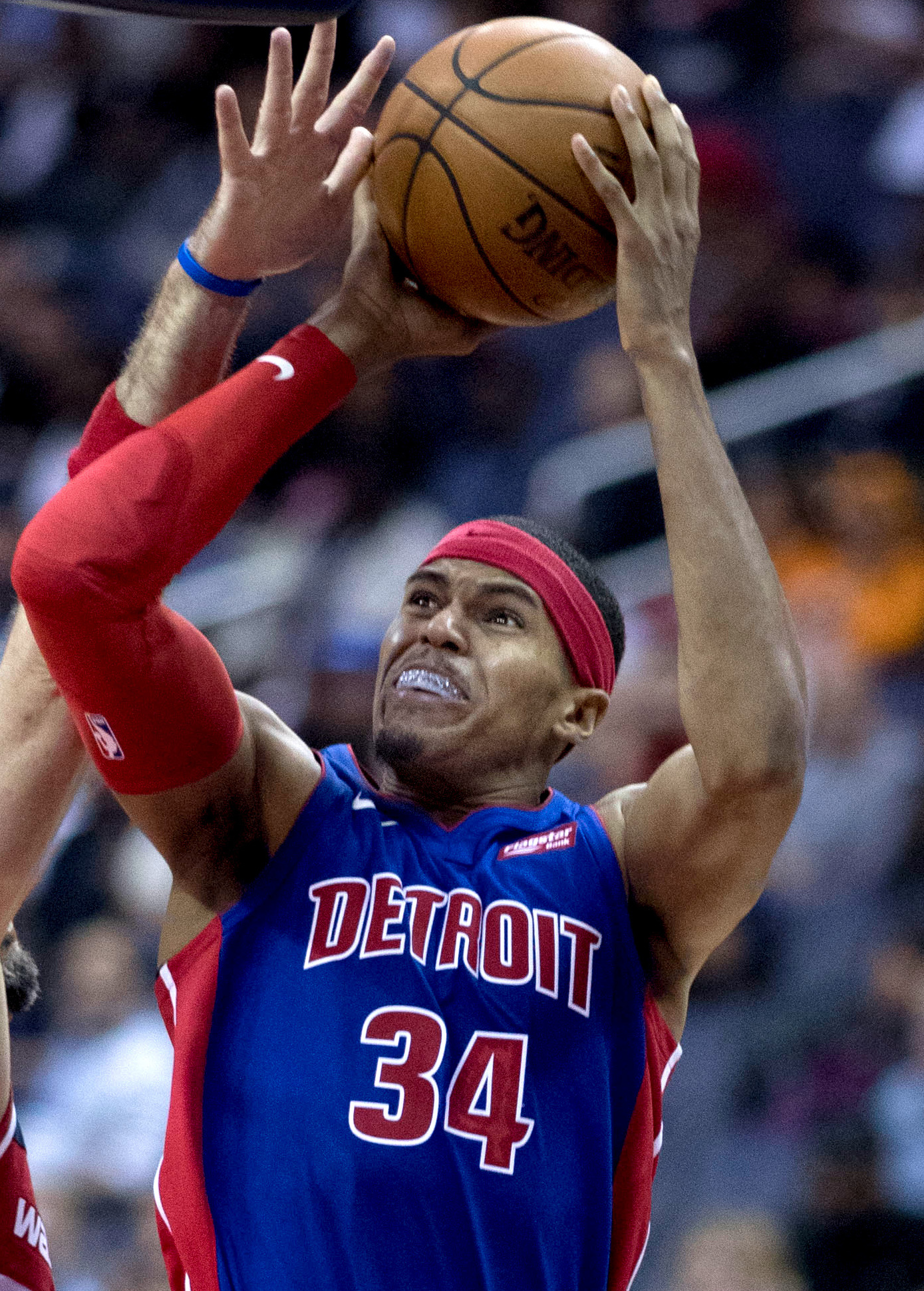
- Harris with the Detroit Pistons in 2017

No. 23 – San Antonio Spurs
- Position: Power forward / small forward
- League: NBA

Personal information
- Born: July 15, 1992 (age 34) Islip, New York, U.S.
- Listed height: 6 ft 8 in (2.03 m)
- Listed weight: 226 lb (103 kg)

Career information
- High school: Half Hollow Hills West (Dix Hills, New York); Long Island Lutheran (Brookville, New York)
- College: Tennessee (2010–2011)
- NBA draft: 2011: 1st round, 19th overall pick
- Drafted by: Charlotte Bobcats
- Playing career: 2011–present

Career history
- 2011–2013: Milwaukee Bucks
- 2013–2016: Orlando Magic
- 2016–2018: Detroit Pistons
- 2018–2019: Los Angeles Clippers
- 2019–2024: Philadelphia 76ers
- 2024–2026: Detroit Pistons
- 2026–present: San Antonio Spurs

Career highlights
- Second-team All-SEC (2011); SEC All-Freshman Team (2011); Second-team Freshman All-American (2011); McDonald's All-American (2010); First-team Parade All-American (2010); Mr. New York Basketball (2010)
- Stats at NBA.com
- Stats at Basketball Reference

Tobias John Lee Harris (born July 15, 1992) is an American professional basketball player for the San Antonio Spurs of the National Basketball Association (NBA). He played one season of college basketball for the Tennessee Volunteers before declaring for the 2011 NBA draft where he was drafted 19th overall by the Charlotte Bobcats and then traded to the Milwaukee Bucks. Harris has also played for the Orlando Magic, Detroit Pistons, Los Angeles Clippers and Philadelphia 76ers. Harris' career earnings are the most of any player in NBA history without an All-Star appearance.

== High school career ==
Harris attended Half Hollow Hills High School West and joined the varsity basketball team as an eighth grader. He played at Half Hollow Hills West until 2008 when he transferred to Long Island Lutheran Middle and High School in Brookville, New York for his junior year. He then transferred back to Half Hollow Hills West for his senior year and went on to earn the 2010 Mr. New York Basketball award. He was also named a 2010 McDonald's All-American. Harris played 66 total games at Half Hollow Hills High School and averaged 24.9 points per game, 2.0 assists per game and 9.9 rebounds per game.

College recruiting
Name	Hometown	School	Height	Weight	Commit date
Tobias Harris; F	Dix Hills, NY	Half Hollow Hills West HS	6 ft 8 in (2.03 m)	210 lb (95 kg)	Sep 16, 2009
Tobias Harris; F	Recruit ratings: Scout: Rivals: (97)				
Overall recruiting rankings: Rivals: No. 7, Scout: No. 4, ESPN: No. 6

== College career ==
Harris played for the Tennessee Volunteers as a freshman in 2010–11 for coach Bruce Pearl. He played the point forward position, a mix between forward and point guard, in Pearl's offense. A USBWA Freshman All-America second-team selection and one of the nation's most consistent and versatile performers, Harris also was named second-team All-SEC by the league's head coaches and earned a spot on the SEC All-Freshman Team. He ranked fifth among all freshmen in the six major conferences with 15.3 points per game. In addition, his 7.3 rebounds per game ranked sixth among all major-conference freshmen.

On May 9, 2011, Harris declared for the NBA draft, forgoing his final three years of college eligibility.

== Professional career ==
=== Milwaukee Bucks (2011–2013) ===
On June 23, 2011, Harris was selected with the 19th overall pick in the 2011 NBA draft by the Charlotte Bobcats. He was later traded to the Milwaukee Bucks on draft night. On December 10, 2011, he signed his rookie-scale contract with the Bucks. Harris made his NBA debut on January 7, 2012, against the Los Angeles Clippers before tallying a team-high 15 points a night later against the Phoenix Suns on January 8. He appeared in 42 games during his rookie season (nine starts), averaging 5.0 points, 2.4 rebounds and 0.5 assists in 11.4 minutes per game.

On October 24, 2012, the Bucks exercised their third-year team option on Harris's rookie-scale contract, extending the contract through the 2013–14 season.

=== Orlando Magic (2013–2016) ===
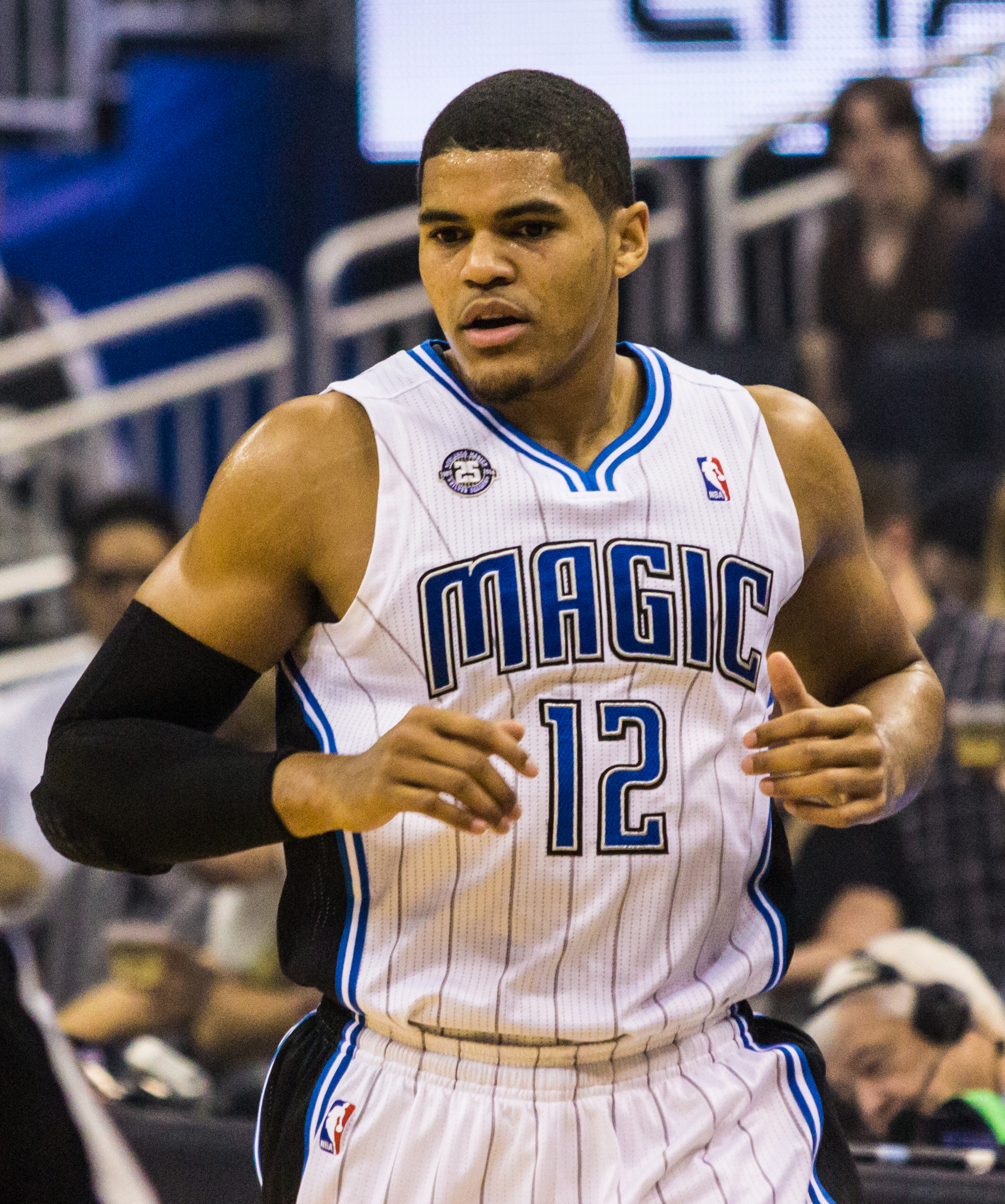
Harris in December 2013

On February 21, 2013, Harris was traded, along with Doron Lamb and Beno Udrih, to the Orlando Magic in exchange for JJ Redick, Gustavo Ayón and Ish Smith. Harris's playing time saw a notable increase in Orlando, and his stats followed suit. Harris more than tripled his points per game average, and more than quadrupled his rebounds, assists and blocks per game.

On October 26, 2013, the Magic exercised their fourth-year team option on Harris's rookie-scale contract, extending the contract through the 2014–15 season.

On January 24, 2014, Harris recorded 28 points and a career-high 20 rebounds in a 114–105 win over the Los Angeles Lakers. On February 7, 2014, Harris scored a game-winning dunk at the buzzer against Oklahoma City in what has been called one of the most exciting finishes in Orlando Magic history. On March 2, 2014, he scored a career-high 31 points in a 92–81 win over the Philadelphia 76ers.

On February 6, 2015, Harris set a new career high with 34 points in a 103–97 win over the Los Angeles Lakers.

On July 14, 2015, Harris re-signed with the Magic to a four-year, $64 million contract.

=== Detroit Pistons (2016–2018) ===
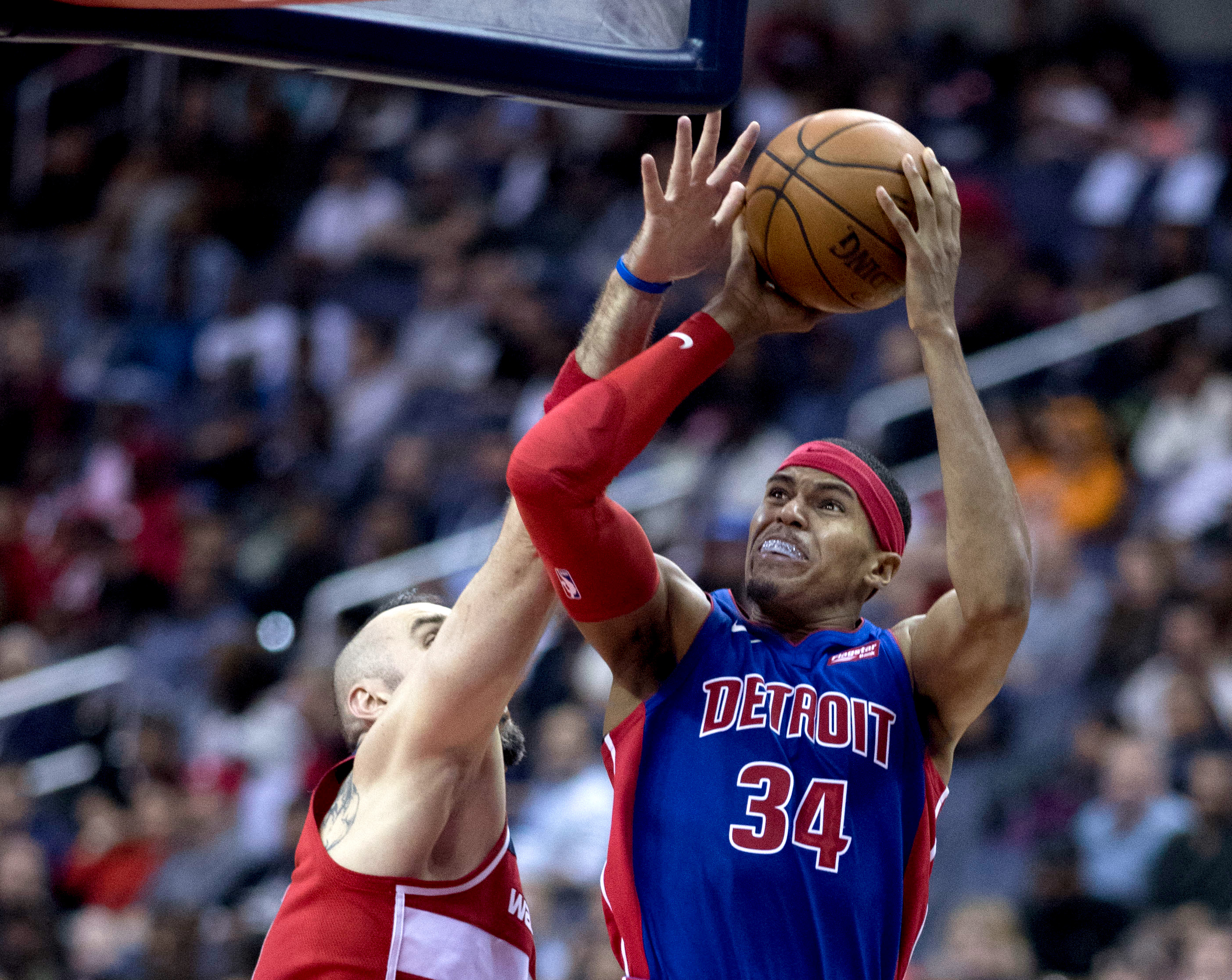
Harris in October 2017

On February 16, 2016, Harris was traded to the Detroit Pistons in exchange for Ersan İlyasova and Brandon Jennings. He made his debut for the Pistons three days later, scoring 21 points off the bench in a 98–86 loss to the Washington Wizards. The Pistons finished the regular season as the eighth seed in the Eastern Conference with a 44–38 record, earning a playoff berth for the first time since 2009. However, in their first-round series against the first-seeded Cleveland Cavaliers, the Pistons were swept 4–0.

On December 23, 2016, Harris came off the bench for the first time in 2016–17 and subsequently scored a season-high 26 points in a 119–113 loss to the Golden State Warriors. On March 11, 2017, he set a new season high with 28 points in a 112–92 win over the New York Knicks.

On October 25, 2017, Harris matched a career high with 34 points in a 122–101 win over the Minnesota Timberwolves. On November 13, 2017, he was named Eastern Conference Player of the Week for games played from Monday November 6 to Sunday November 12. On December 26, 2017, he scored 21 of his 30 points in the first quarter of the Pistons' 107–83 win over the Indiana Pacers.

=== Los Angeles Clippers (2018–2019) ===
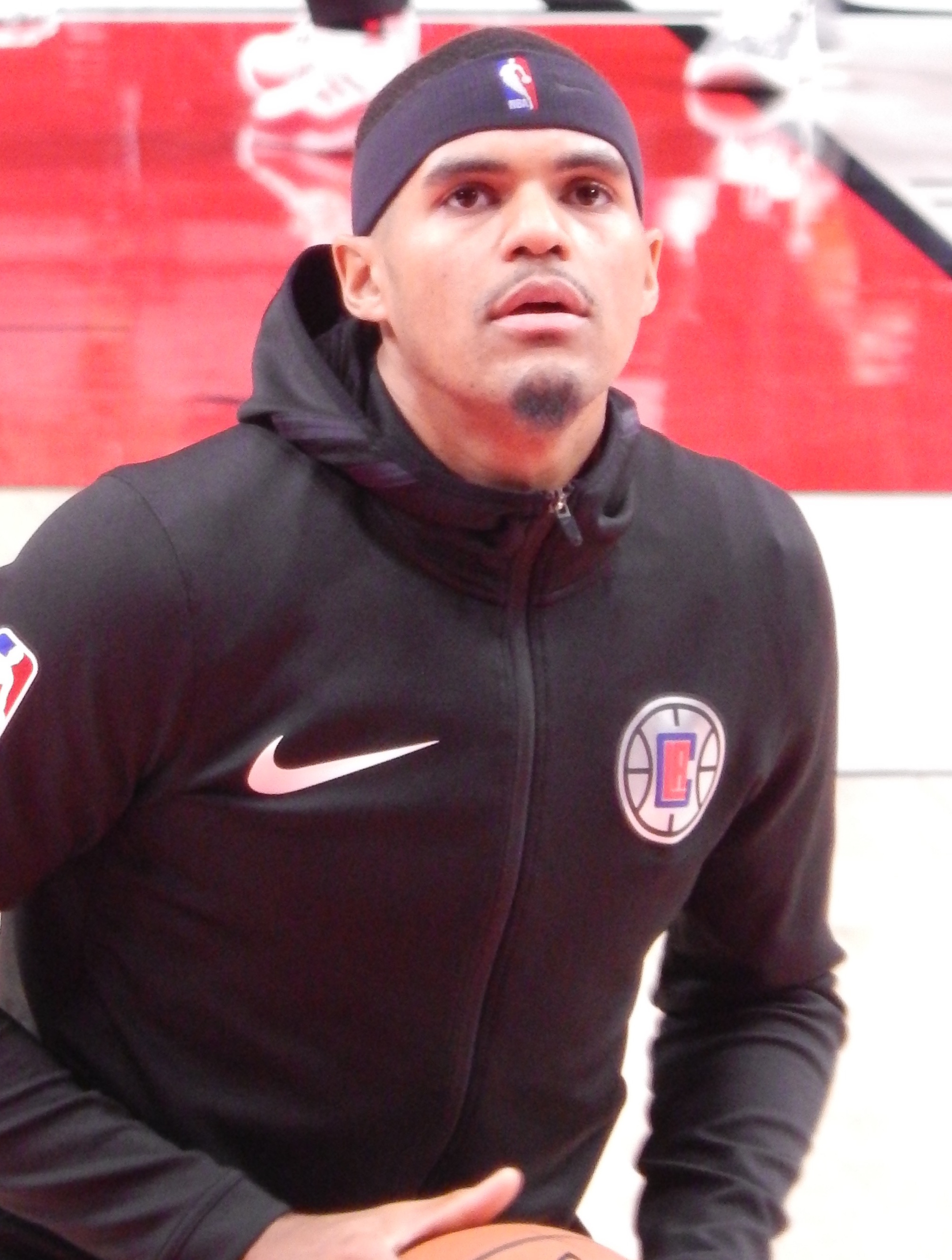
Harris with the Clippers in November 2018

On January 29, 2018, Harris, along with Avery Bradley, Boban Marjanović, a future protected first-round draft pick and a future second-round draft pick, was traded to the Los Angeles Clippers in exchange for Blake Griffin, Willie Reed and Brice Johnson. He made his debut for the Clippers on February 3, scoring 24 points in a 113–103 win over the Chicago Bulls. On February 23, 2018, he recorded 30 points and 12 rebounds in a 128–117 win over the Phoenix Suns.

On November 15, 2018, Harris scored 18 points in a 116–111 win over the San Antonio Spurs, thus scoring at least 15 points in a career-best 14 straight games. On November 25, he had 34 points and 11 rebounds in a 104–100 win over the Portland Trail Blazers. He was subsequently named Western Conference Player of the Week for games played Monday, November 19, through Sunday, November 25. It was his second career Player of the Week award. He also earned Western Conference Player of the Month for October and November, the first career Player of the Month honor of his career. On December 17, he scored a career-high 39 points in a 131–127 loss to the Trail Blazers. On January 20, he had 27 points, nine rebounds and nine assists in a 103–95 win over the Spurs.

=== Philadelphia 76ers (2019–2024) ===
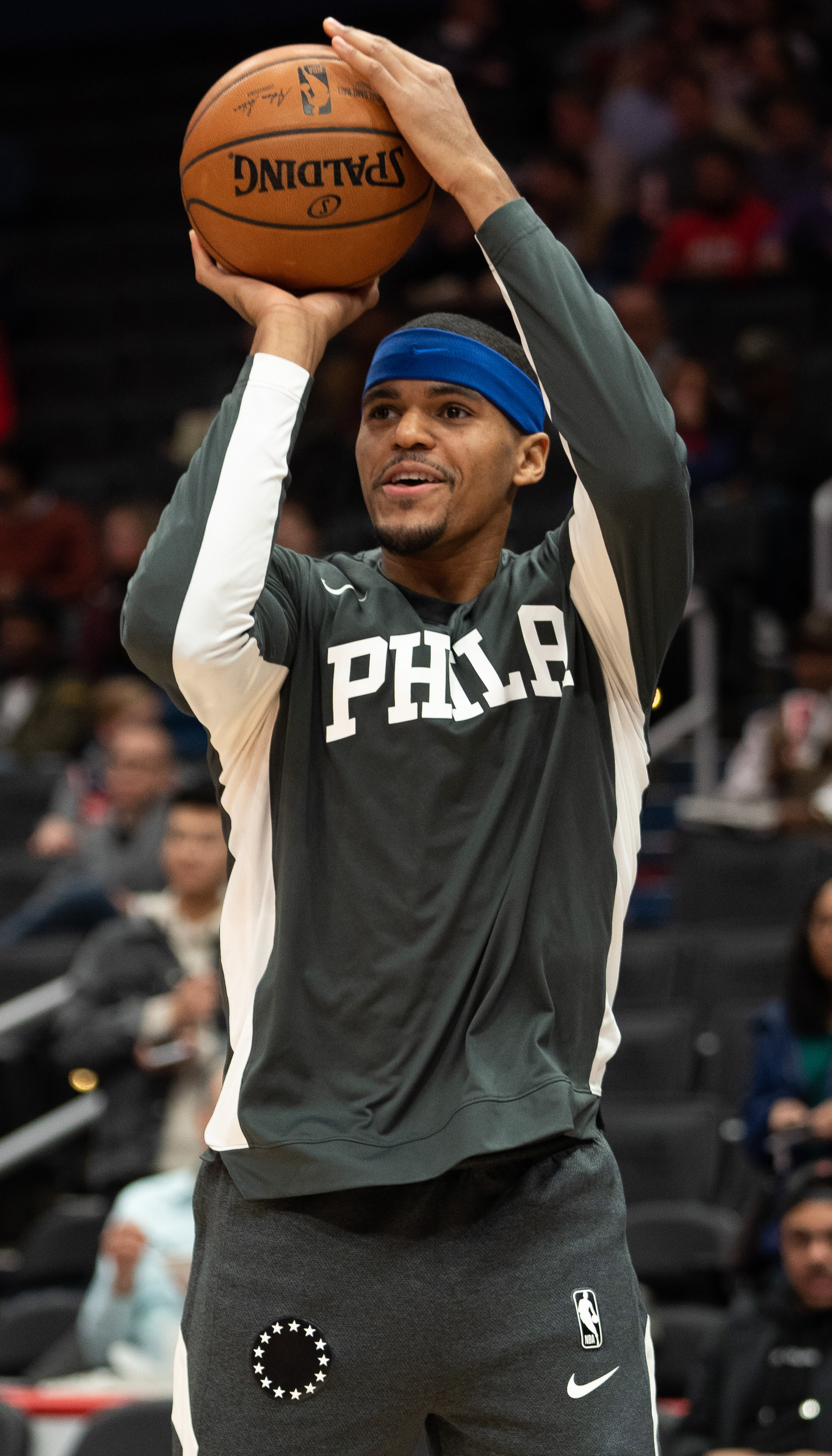
Harris in December 2019

On February 6, 2019, Harris was traded, along with Boban Marjanović and Mike Scott, to the Philadelphia 76ers in exchange for Wilson Chandler, Mike Muscala, Landry Shamet and a number of future draft picks. He made his debut for the 76ers two days later, recording 14 points and eight rebounds in a 117–110 win over the Denver Nuggets. On July 6, 2019, the Sixers re-signed Harris to a five-year, $180 million contract.

On January 4, 2021, Harris was named the Eastern Conference Player of the Week. On January 6, Harris scored his 10,000th career point in a game against the Washington Wizards. On January 27, 2021, Harris hit a game-winning pull-up jump shot with 3.7 seconds left to help the 76ers hold off a comeback by the Los Angeles Lakers in a 107–106 victory.

On April 16, 2022, during Game 1 of the first round of the playoffs, Harris logged 26 points and six assists in a 131–111 win over the Toronto Raptors.

On May 2, 2024, during the crucial Game 6 of the first round of the playoffs, Harris went scoreless as the Knicks eliminated the 76ers 118–115. Harris averaged 9.0 PPG in the series.

=== Return to Detroit (2024–2026) ===
On July 8, 2024, Harris signed a two-year, $52 million contract to return to the Detroit Pistons. Harris contributed to a significantly improved Detroit Pistons team that finished the 2024–25 season with a 44–38 record, their first winning season since 2016, and clinched a playoff berth for the first time since 2019, becoming only the second team in NBA history to triple its win total from the previous season.

In the first round of the 2025 NBA playoffs against the New York Knicks, Harris recorded 25 points, six rebounds, and two blocks in a 123–112 Game 1 loss. The Pistons were ultimately eliminated in six games.

Harris started 63 contests for the Pistons during the 2025–26 NBA season, recording averages of 13.3 points, 5.1 rebounds, and 2.5 assists. Harris played some of his best basketball in the 2026 playoffs, having eight straight 20-point games, the longest such streak in his career. However, the Pistons eventually lost in Game 7 of Round 2 to the Cleveland Cavaliers with Harris struggling.

=== San Antonio Spurs (2026–present) ===
On July 6, 2026, Harris signed a two-year, $30.8 million contract with the San Antonio Spurs.

== Career statistics ==
Legend
GP	Games played	GS	Games started	MPG	Minutes per game
FG%	Field goal percentage	3P%	3-point field goal percentage	FT%	Free throw percentage
RPG	Rebounds per game	APG	Assists per game	SPG	Steals per game
BPG	Blocks per game	PPG	Points per game	**Bold**	Career high
*	Led the league

=== NBA ===
==== Regular season ====
Year	Team	GP	GS	MPG	FG%	3P%	FT%	RPG	APG	SPG	BPG	PPG
2011–12	Milwaukee	42	9	11.4	.467	.261	.815	2.4	.5	.3	.2	5.0
2012–13	Milwaukee	28	14	11.6	.461	.333	.885	2.0	.5	.3	.3	4.9
2012–13	Orlando	27	20	**36.1**	.453	.310	.721	**8.5**	2.1	.9	**1.4**	17.3
2013–14	Orlando	61	36	30.3	.464	.254	.807	7.0	1.3	.7	.4	14.6
2014–15	Orlando	68	63	34.8	.466	.364	.788	6.3	1.8	1.0	.5	17.1
2015–16	Orlando	49	49	32.9	.464	.311	.784	7.0	2.0	1.0	.6	13.7
2015–16	Detroit	27	25	33.5	.477	.375	**.911**	6.2	2.6	.7	.4	16.6
2016–17	Detroit	**82***	48	31.3	.481	.347	.841	5.1	1.7	.7	.5	16.1
2017–18	Detroit	48	48	32.6	.451	.409	.846	5.1	2.0	.7	.3	18.1
2017–18	L.A. Clippers	32	32	34.5	.473	.414	.800	6.0	3.1	**1.2**	.6	19.3
2018–19	L.A. Clippers	**55***	**55***	34.6	.496	**.434**	.877	7.9	2.7	.7	.4	**20.9**
2018–19	Philadelphia	**27***	**27***	35.0	.469	.326	.841	7.9	2.9	.4	.5	18.2
2019–20	Philadelphia	72	72	34.3	.471	.367	.806	6.9	3.2	.7	.6	19.6
2020–21	Philadelphia	62	62	32.5	**.512**	.394	.892	6.8	**3.5**	.9	.8	19.5
2021–22	Philadelphia	73	73	34.8	.482	.367	.842	6.8	**3.5**	.6	.6	17.2
2022–23	Philadelphia	74	74	32.9	.501	.389	.876	5.7	2.5	.9	.5	14.7
2023–24	Philadelphia	70	70	33.8	.487	.353	.878	6.5	3.1	1.0	.7	17.2
2024–25	Detroit	73	73	31.6	.477	.345	.861	5.9	2.2	1.0	.8	13.7
2025–26	Detroit	63	63	27.7	.469	.368	.866	5.1	2.5	.9	.4	13.3
Career		1,033	913	31.4	.478	.366	.838	6.1	2.4	.8	.5	15.9

==== Playoffs ====
Year	Team	GP	GS	MPG	FG%	3P%	FT%	RPG	APG	SPG	BPG	PPG
2016	Detroit	4	4	**39.0**	.457	.333	.923	**9.5**	3.0	.8	.8	14.5
2019	Philadelphia	12	12	36.9	.425	.349	.846	9.1	**4.0**	1.1	.5	15.5
2020	Philadelphia	4	4	37.1	.383	.133	.789	**9.5**	**4.0**	.5	.3	15.8
2021	Philadelphia	12	12	36.5	.488	.372	.875	8.5	3.5	1.0	.4	**21.8**
2022	Philadelphia	12	12	38.8	.500	.386	.864	7.6	2.9	1.1	.8	16.9
2023	Philadelphia	11	11	35.6	**.522**	.366	.867	7.3	1.6	.6	.5	15.3
2024	Philadelphia	6	6	36.4	.431	.333	**1.000**	7.2	1.5	.2	.5	9.0
2025	Detroit	6	6	38.8	.479	**.435**	**1.000**	7.7	.5	1.0	**1.2**	15.7
2026	Detroit	**14**	**14**	34.6	.425	.292	.825	7.2	1.6	**1.5**	.8	18.1
Career		81	81	36.8	.463	.344	.862	8.0	2.5	1.0	.6	16.5

=== College ===
Year	Team	GP	GS	MPG	FG%	3P%	FT%	RPG	APG	SPG	BPG	PPG
2010–11	Tennessee	34	33	29.2	.460	.303	.753	7.3	1.3	.7	.9	15.3

== Personal life ==
Harris was born in Islip, New York, to parents Lisa and Torrel, along with his five siblings. His father, Torrel, played college basketball at Duquesne and Murray State. Former NBA player and teammate Channing Frye is Harris's first cousin. His grandfather, John Mulzac, was a member of the Tuskegee Airmen.

Harris is close friends with former NBA center Boban Marjanović, who was his teammate in Detroit, Los Angeles and Philadelphia from 2016 to 2019. Harris wears number 12 as a tribute to his close friend and former teammate Morgan Childs, who died at age 17 from leukemia.

Harris married his long-time girlfriend, Jasmine Winton, in 2022.

=== Philanthropy ===
Harris was the recipient of the 2016 and 2021 NBA Community Service Award. He created the "Tobias Harris School of Mentoring Program" and partnered with the Yes We Can Community Center and UAS Inc to help athletes and their parents with the recruiting and scholarship process. Harris also donated $10,000 to "Feeding Children Everywhere", a social charity that helps prepare food for hungry children.

Harris launched the Tobias Lit Labs campaign which brings books and authors to families and schools. He also partnered with Read by 4th to have a block party in North Philadelphia. Harris contributed more than $2 million through his Tobias Harris Charitable Fund, which provides classroom supplies and supports professional development for educators and students. He has donated $10,000 to the Kappa Alpha Psi Foundation to provide grants for scholarships, community projects and after-school programs. Harris has also donated another $1 million to nine different charities to the Philadelphia area.

=== Spirituality ===
Harris identifies as a Christian and discusses his faith in public often. In 2015 in an interview with "Razz and Jazz Sports", he stated, "Any person I meet, I try to embrace them and show them love so that they know I'm a Christian, Jesus Christ was a loving man. And as Christians, we have to try to model our lives after Jesus Christ".

=== Endorsements ===
Harris has many off-court endorsements including Nike, Off-White Damari Savile, Ovadia & Sons, and more.
