= 2016–17 Detroit Pistons season =

- Head coach: Stan Van Gundy
- President: Stan Van Gundy
- General manager: Jeff Bower
- Owner: Tom Gores
- Arena: The Palace of Auburn Hills

Results
- Record: 37–45 (.451)
- Place: Division: 5th (Central); Conference: 10th (Eastern)
- Playoff finish: Did not qualify
- Stats at Basketball Reference

Local media
- Television: Fox Sports Detroit
- Radio: WMGC

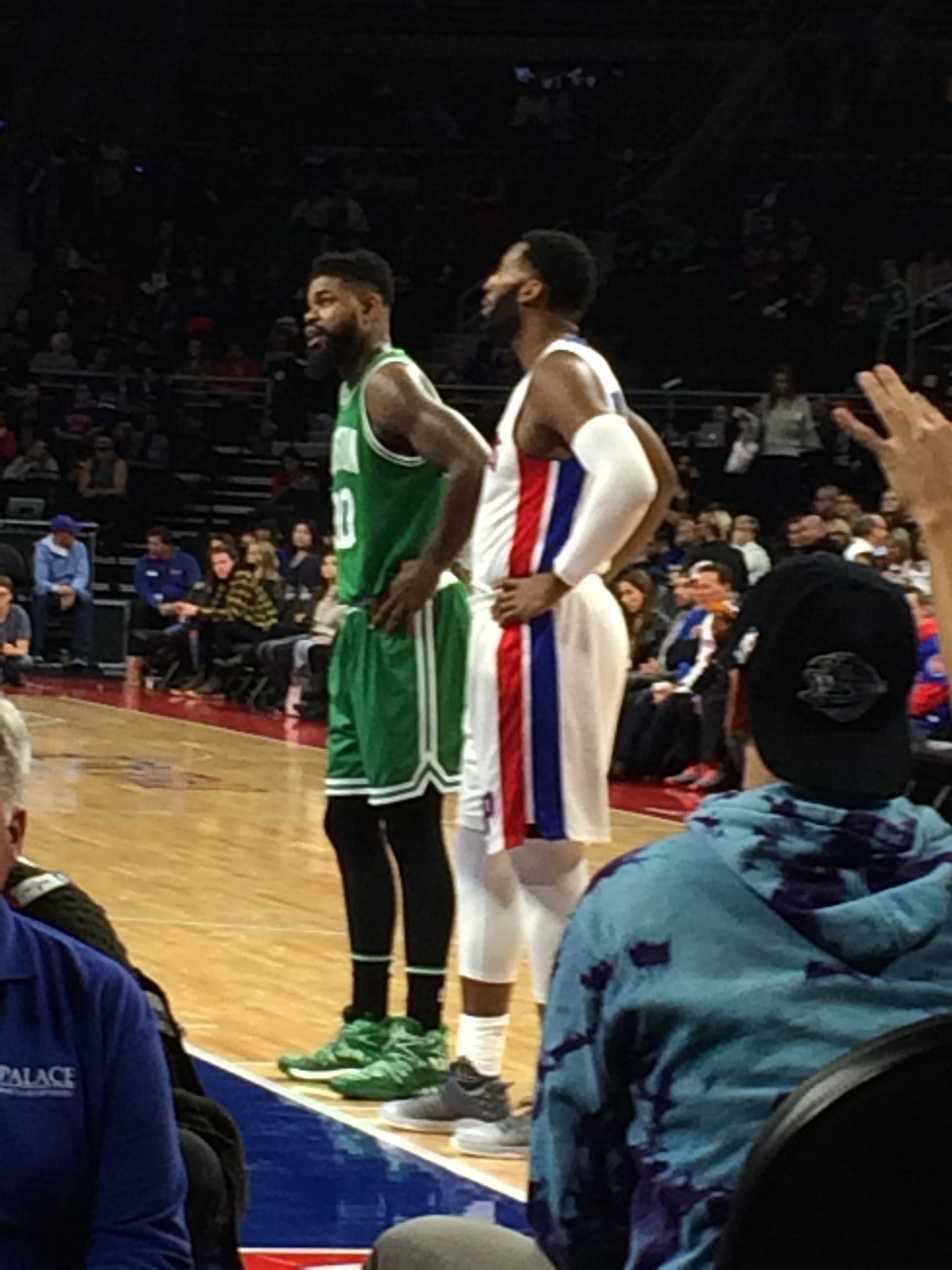
Amir Johnson and Andre Drummond watch during a November 19, 2016 game at the Palace of Auburn Hills.

The 2016–17 NBA season was the 76th season of the Detroit Pistons franchise, their 69th in the National Basketball Association (NBA), and their 60th in Metro Detroit. It was the Pistons' final season at The Palace of Auburn Hills in nearby Auburn Hills, Michigan, ending a 42-year history of professional sports in Oakland County. They moved to the new Little Caesars Arena in Detroit for the 2017–18 season.

== Draft picks ==
Round	Pick	Player	Position	Nationality	College/Team
1	18	Henry Ellenson	PF	United States	Marquette
2	49	Michael Gbinije	PG	United States	Syracuse

== Roster ==
2016–17 Detroit Pistons roster
Players

Pos.	No.	Player	Height	Weight	DOB	From
C	12	Aron Baynes	6 ft 10 in (2.08 m)	260 lb (118 kg)	1986-12-09	Washington State
SG	25	Reggie Bullock	6 ft 7 in (2.01 m)	205 lb (93 kg)	1991-03-16	North Carolina
SG	5	Kentavious Caldwell-Pope	6 ft 5 in (1.96 m)	205 lb (93 kg)	1993-02-18	Georgia
C	0	Andre Drummond	6 ft 11 in (2.11 m)	279 lb (127 kg)	1993-08-10	Connecticut
PF	8	Henry Ellenson	6 ft 11 in (2.11 m)	245 lb (111 kg)	1997-01-13	Marquette
SG	9	Michael Gbinije	6 ft 7 in (2.01 m)	200 lb (91 kg)	1992-06-05	Syracuse
SF	34	Tobias Harris	6 ft 9 in (2.06 m)	235 lb (107 kg)	1992-07-15	Tennessee
SG	6	Darrun Hilliard	6 ft 6 in (1.98 m)	205 lb (93 kg)	1993-04-13	Villanova
PG	1	Reggie Jackson	6 ft 3 in (1.91 m)	208 lb (94 kg)	1990-04-16	Boston College
SF	7	Stanley Johnson	6 ft 7 in (2.01 m)	245 lb (111 kg)	1996-05-29	Arizona
PF	30	Jon Leuer	6 ft 10 in (2.08 m)	228 lb (103 kg)	1989-05-14	Wisconsin
C	51	Boban Marjanović	7 ft 4 in (2.24 m)	290 lb (132 kg)	1988-08-15	Serbia
PF	13	Marcus Morris	6 ft 10 in (2.08 m)	235 lb (107 kg)	1989-09-02	Kansas
PG	14	Ish Smith	6 ft 0 in (1.83 m)	175 lb (79 kg)	1988-07-05	Wake Forest
PG	19	Beno Udrih	6 ft 3 in (1.91 m)	205 lb (93 kg)	1982-07-05	Slovenia

Coaches
Head coach
- Stan Van Gundy
Assistant(s)
- Malik Allen
- Bob Beyer
- Tim Hardaway
- Charles Klask
- Brendan Malone

Legend
- (DP) Unsigned draft pick
- (FA) Free agent
- (S) Suspended
- (DL) On assignment to D-League affiliate
- Injured

Roster
Updated: 2017-03-26

== Standings ==
=== Division ===
Central Division	W	L	PCT	GB	Home	Road	Div	GP
y – Cleveland Cavaliers	51	31	.622	–	31‍–‍10	20‍–‍21	8–8	82
x – Milwaukee Bucks	42	40	.512	9.0	23‍–‍18	19‍–‍22	10–6	82
x – Indiana Pacers	42	40	.512	9.0	29‍–‍12	13‍–‍28	8–8	82
x – Chicago Bulls	41	41	.500	10.0	25‍–‍16	16‍–‍25	9–7	82
Detroit Pistons	37	45	.451	14.0	24‍–‍17	13‍–‍28	5–11	82

=== Conference ===
Eastern Conference
#	Team	W	L	PCT	GB	GP
1	c – Boston Celtics *	53	29	.646	–	82
2	y – Cleveland Cavaliers *	51	31	.622	2.0	82
3	x – Toronto Raptors	51	31	.622	2.0	82
4	y – Washington Wizards *	49	33	.598	4.0	82
5	x – Atlanta Hawks	43	39	.524	10.0	82
6	x – Milwaukee Bucks	42	40	.512	11.0	82
7	x – Indiana Pacers	42	40	.512	11.0	82
8	x – Chicago Bulls	41	41	.500	12.0	82
9	Miami Heat	41	41	.500	12.0	82
10	Detroit Pistons	37	45	.451	16.0	82
11	Charlotte Hornets	36	46	.439	17.0	82
12	New York Knicks	31	51	.378	22.0	82
13	Orlando Magic	29	53	.354	24.0	82
14	Philadelphia 76ers	28	54	.341	25.0	82
15	Brooklyn Nets	20	62	.244	33.0	82

== Game log ==
=== Pre-season ===
2016 pre-season game log
Total: 3–3 (Home: 1–2 Road: 2–1)
Pre-season: 3–3 (home: 1–2; road: 2–1)

Game	Date	Team	Score	High points	High rebounds	High assists	Location Attendance	Record
1	October 6	@ Brooklyn	L 94–101	Morris & Drummond (17)	Andre Drummond (21)	Caldwell-Pope & McCallum (4)	Barclays Center; 8,782	0–1
2	October 10	San Antonio	L 81–86	Andre Drummond (17)	Andre Drummond (13)	Leuer & Smith (5)	Palace of Auburn Hills; 12,103	0–2
3	October 13	@ Atlanta	W 99–94	Harris & Smith (18)	Jon Leuer (9)	Ish Smith (8)	Philips Arena; 10,852	1–2
4	October 15	@ Philadelphia	W 97–76	Tobias Harris (18)	Andre Drummond (13)	Ish Smith (6)	Wells Fargo Center; 10,891	2–2
5	October 17	Milwaukee	W 102–78	Kentavious Caldwell-Pope (23)	Andre Drummond (13)	Ish Smith (7)	Palace of Auburn Hills; 10,096	3–2
6	October 19	Toronto	L 92–103	Andre Drummond (16)	Andre Drummond (13)	Lorenzo Brown (6)	Palace of Auburn Hills; 22,076	3–3

2016–17 season schedule

=== Regular season ===
2016–17 game log
Total: 37–45 (Home: 24–17; Road: 13–28)
October: 2–1 (home: 2–0; road: 0–1)

Game	Date	Team	Score	High points	High rebounds	High assists	Location Attendance	Record
1	October 26	@ Toronto	L 91–109	Tobias Harris (22)	Morris & Leuer (9)	Ish Smith (7)	Air Canada Centre; 19,800	0–1
2	October 28	Orlando	W 108–82	Tobias Harris (18)	Andre Drummond (20)	Ish Smith (8)	Palace of Auburn Hills; 19,122	1–1
3	October 30	Milwaukee	W 98–83	Kentavious Caldwell-Pope (21)	Andre Drummond (23)	Ish Smith (7)	Palace of Auburn Hills; 15,161	2–1

November : 8–9 (home: 5–2; road: 3–7)

Game	Date	Team	Score	High points	High rebounds	High assists	Location Attendance	Record
4	November 1	New York	W 102–89	Tobias Harris (25)	Andre Drummond (13)	Ish Smith (8)	Palace of Auburn Hills; 13,087	3–1
5	November 2	@ Brooklyn	L 101–109	Harris & Morris (23)	Caldwell-Pope & Leuer (7)	Ish Smith (7)	Barclays Center; 13,650	3–2
6	November 5	Denver	W 103–86	Andre Drummond (19)	Andre Drummond (20)	Ish Smith (8)	Palace of Auburn Hills; 16,218	4–2
7	November 7	@ L.A. Clippers	L 82–114	Andre Drummond (15)	Andre Drummond (12)	Smith, Udrih & Johnson (3)	Staples Center; 19,060	4–3
8	November 9	@ Phoenix	L 100–107	Kentavious Caldwell-Pope (27)	Andre Drummond (10)	Ish Smith (7)	Talking Stick Resort Arena; 16,719	4–4
9	November 11	@ San Antonio	L 86–96	Andre Drummond (20)	Andre Drummond (17)	Kentavious Caldwell-Pope (7)	AT&T Center; 18,418	4–5
10	November 12	@ Denver	W 106–95	Tobias Harris (19)	Andre Drummond (12)	Ish Smith (8)	Pepsi Center; 13,997	5–5
11	November 14	Oklahoma City	W 104–88	Tobias Harris (22)	Jon Leuer (9)	Morris (5)	Palace of Auburn Hills; 14,172	6–5
12	November 16	@ New York	L 102–105	Kentavious Caldwell-Pope (21)	Tobias Harris (10)	Ish Smith (8)	Madison Square Garden; 19,812	6–6
13	November 18	@ Cleveland	L 81–104	Jon Leuer (15)	Andre Drummond (10)	Ish Smith (6)	Quicken Loans Arena; 20,562	6–7
14	November 19	Boston	L 92–94	Marcus Morris (24)	Andre Drummond (17)	Ish Smith (7)	Palace of Auburn Hills; 16,107	6–8
15	November 21	Houston	L 96–99	Kentavious Caldwell-Pope (26)	Andre Drummond (16)	Ish Smith (8)	Palace of Auburn Hills; 13,632	6–9
16	November 23	Miami	W 107–84	Kentavious Caldwell-Pope (22)	Andre Drummond (15)	Marcus Morris (6)	Palace of Auburn Hills; 14,520	7–9
17	November 25	L.A. Clippers	W 108–97	Marcus Morris (17)	Jon Leuer (11)	Kentavious Caldwell-Pope (10)	Palace of Auburn Hills; 17,023	8–9
18	November 26	@ Oklahoma City	L 88–106	Tobias Harris (21)	Andre Drummond (8)	Ish Smith (3)	Chesapeake Energy Arena; 18,203	8–10
19	November 29	@ Charlotte	W 112–89	Tobias Harris (24)	Aron Baynes (8)	Caldwell-Pope & Udrih (7)	Spectrum Center; 14,266	9–10
20	November 30	@ Boston	W 121–114	Kentavious Caldwell-Pope (25)	Andre Drummond (17)	Ish Smith (8)	TD Garden; 17,338	10–10

December : 5–10 (home: 2–6; road: 3–4)

Game	Date	Team	Score	High points	High rebounds	High assists	Location Attendance	Record
21	December 2	@ Atlanta	W 121–85	Kentavious Caldwell-Pope (23)	Andre Drummond (14)	Ish Smith (13)	Philips Arena; 15,500	11–10
22	December 4	Orlando	L 92–98	Marcus Morris (21)	Andre Drummond (10)	Caldwell-Pope & Jackson (4)	Palace of Auburn Hills; 15,206	11–11
23	December 6	Chicago	W 102–91	Tobias Harris (22)	Andre Drummond (10)	Reggie Jackson (7)	Palace of Auburn Hills; 14,305	12–11
24	December 7	@ Charlotte	L 77–87	Andre Drummond (26)	Andre Drummond (20)	Caldwell-Pope & Leuer (6)	Spectrum Center; 15,141	12–12
25	December 9	@ Minnesota	W 117–90	Andre Drummond (22)	Andre Drummond (22)	Kentavious Caldwell-Pope (7)	Target Center; 14,109	13–12
26	December 11	Philadelphia	L 79–97	Marcus Morris (28)	Andre Drummond (14)	Stanley Johnson (4)	Palace of Auburn Hills; 7,244	13–13
27	December 14	@ Dallas	W 95–85	Reggie Jackson (20)	Andre Drummond (17)	Jackson & Smith (6)	American Airlines Center; 19,687	14–13
28	December 16	@ Washington	L 108–122	Kentavious Caldwell-Pope (24)	Andre Drummond (12)	Jon Leuer (5)	Verizon Center; 15,573	14–14
29	December 17	Indiana	L 90–105	Kentavious Caldwell-Pope (20)	Andre Drummond (15)	Reggie Jackson (10)	Palace of Auburn Hills; 15,231	14–15
30	December 19	@ Chicago	L 82–113	Jon Leuer (16)	Jon Leuer (5)	Ish Smith (7)	United Center; 21,400	14–16
31	December 21	Memphis	L 86–98	Jackson & Leuer (18)	Andre Drummond (19)	Reggie Jackson (7)	Palace of Auburn Hills; 16,033	14–17
32	December 23	Golden State	L 113–119	Tobias Harris (26)	Andre Drummond (9)	Reggie Jackson (6)	Palace of Auburn Hills; 21,012	14–18
33	December 26	Cleveland	W 106–90	Tobias Harris (21)	Andre Drummond (17)	Reggie Jackson (6)	Palace of Auburn Hills; 18,123	15–18
34	December 28	Milwaukee	L 94–119	Tobias Harris (23)	Tobias Harris (12)	Kentavious Caldwell-Pope (7)	Palace of Auburn Hills; 17,222	15–19
35	December 30	@ Atlanta	L 98–105	Jon Leuer (22)	Andre Drummond (15)	Reggie Jackson (8)	Philips Arena; 19,009	15–20

January : 6–7 (home: 3–2; road: 3–5)

Game	Date	Team	Score	High points	High rebounds	High assists	Location Attendance	Record
36	January 1	@ Miami	W 107–98	Reggie Jackson (27)	Andre Drummond (18)	Kentavious Caldwell-Pope (5)	American Airlines Arena; 19,844	16–20
37	January 3	Indiana	L 116–121	Tobias Harris (22)	Andre Drummond (14)	Reggie Jackson (12)	Palace of Auburn Hills; 13,435	16–21
38	January 5	Charlotte	W 115–114	Tobias Harris (25)	Boban Marjanović (19)	Reggie Jackson (11)	Palace of Auburn Hills; 13,723	17–21
39	January 8	@ Portland	W 125–124 (2OT)	Reggie Jackson (31)	Andre Drummond (14)	Marcus Morris (5)	Moda Center; 13,506	18–21
40	January 10	@ Sacramento	L 94–100	Kentavious Caldwell-Pope (21)	Andre Drummond (12)	Jackson & Johnson (3)	Golden 1 Center; 17,608	18–22
41	January 12	@ Golden State	L 107–127	Marcus Morris (21)	Boban Marjanović (11)	Beno Udrih (4)	Oracle Arena; 19,596	18–23
42	January 13	@ Utah	L 77–110	Tobias Harris (13)	Andre Drummond (19)	Beno Udrih (7)	Vivint Smart Home Arena; 18,564	18–24
43	January 15	@ L.A. Lakers	W 102–97	Morris & Harris (23)	Andre Drummond (17)	Johnson & Smith (6)	Staples Center; 18,997	19–24
44	January 18	Atlanta	W 118–95	Reggie Jackson (26)	Andre Drummond (17)	Marcus Morris (7)	Palace of Auburn Hills; 15,159	20–24
45	January 21	Washington	W 113–112	Marcus Morris (25)	Marcus Morris (11)	Reggie Jackson (8)	Palace of Auburn Hills; 18,231	21–24
46	January 23	Sacramento	L 104–109	Reggie Jackson (18)	Andre Drummond (12)	Reggie Jackson (11)	Palace of Auburn Hills; 14,017	21–25
47	January 28	@ Miami	L 103–116	Reggie Jackson (24)	Andre Drummond (20)	Reggie Jackson (3)	American Airlines Arena; 19,600	21–26
48	January 30	@ Boston	L 109–113	Andre Drummond (28)	Andre Drummond (22)	Reggie Jackson (6)	TD Garden; 18,188	21–27

February : 8–4 (home: 7–2; road: 1–2)

Game	Date	Team	Score	High points	High rebounds	High assists	Location Attendance	Record
49	February 1	New Orleans	W 118–98	Kentavious Caldwell-Pope (38)	Tobias Harris (8)	Ish Smith (7)	Palace of Auburn Hills; 14,262	22–27
50	February 3	Minnesota	W 116–108	Marcus Morris (36)	Andre Drummond (18)	Reggie Jackson (8)	Palace of Auburn Hills; 16,934	23–27
51	February 4	@ Indiana	L 84–105	Marcus Morris (19)	Andre Drummond (9)	Ish Smith (6)	Bankers Life Fieldhouse; 17,660	23–28
52	February 6	Philadelphia	W 113–96	Marcus Morris (19)	Andre Drummond (17)	Reggie Jackson (6)	Palace of Auburn Hills; 14,731	24–28
53	February 8	L.A. Lakers	W 121–102	Andre Drummond (24)	Andre Drummond (17)	Reggie Jackson (8)	Palace of Auburn Hills; 15,121	25–28
54	February 10	San Antonio	L 92–103	Tobias Harris (16)	Andre Drummond (15)	Reggie Jackson (7)	Palace of Auburn Hills; 17,222	25–29
55	February 12	@ Toronto	W 102–101	Tobias Harris (24)	Andre Drummond (18)	Ish Smith (5)	Air Canada Centre; 19,800	26–29
56	February 13	@ Milwaukee	L 89–102	Marcus Morris (26)	Andre Drummond (12)	Reggie Jackson (9)	BMO Harris Bradley Center; 13,397	26–30
57	February 15	Dallas	W 98–91	Reggie Jackson (22)	Marcus Morris (14)	Reggie Jackson (4)	Palace of Auburn Hills; 13,549	27–30
All-Star Break
58	February 23	Charlotte	W 114–108 (OT)	Kentavious Caldwell-Pope (33)	Andre Drummond (13)	Ish Smith (16)	Palace of Auburn Hills; 14,913	28–30
59	February 26	Boston	L 98–104	Kentavious Caldwell-Pope (18)	Andre Drummond (15)	Reggie Jackson (6)	Palace of Auburn Hills; 20,141	28–31
60	February 28	Portland	W 120–113 (OT)	Marcus Morris (37)	Andre Drummond (15)	Ish Smith (7)	Palace of Auburn Hills; 13,502	29–31

March : 6–11 (home: 5–3; road: 1–8)

Game	Date	Team	Score	High points	High rebounds	High assists	Location Attendance	Record
61	March 1	@ New Orleans	L 86–109	Jon Leuer (22)	Andre Drummond (17)	Reggie Jackson (4)	Smoothie King Center; 14,406	29–32
62	March 4	@ Philadelphia	W 136–106	Kentavious Caldwell-Pope (26)	Andre Drummond (14)	Ish Smith (13)	Wells Fargo Center; 19,523	30–32
63	March 6	Chicago	W 109–95	Reggie Jackson (26)	Drummond, Harris (8)	Ish Smith (7)	Palace of Auburn Hills; 16,039	31–32
64	March 8	@ Indiana	L 98–115	Tobias Harris (22)	Andre Drummond (15)	Ish Smith (6)	Bankers Life Fieldhouse; 14,353	31–33
65	March 9	Cleveland	W 106–101	Reggie Jackson (21)	Andre Drummond (16)	Reggie Jackson (5)	Palace of Auburn Hills; 19,421	32–33
66	March 11	New York	W 112–92	Tobias Harris (28)	Andre Drummond (15)	Reggie Jackson (8)	Palace of Auburn Hills; 19,607	33–33
67	March 14	@ Cleveland	L 96–128	Tobias Harris (17)	Andre Drummond (14)	Reggie Jackson (6)	Quicken Loans Arena; 20,562	33–34
68	March 15	Utah	L 83–97	Ish Smith (16)	Aron Baynes (12)	Ish Smith (3)	Palace of Auburn Hills; 14,033	33–35
69	March 17	Toronto	L 75–87	Reggie Jackson (20)	Andre Drummond (22)	Reggie Jackson (6)	Palace of Auburn Hills; 16,541	33–36
70	March 19	Phoenix	W 112–95	Kentavious Caldwell-Pope (23)	Andre Drummond (18)	Kentavious Caldwell-Pope (8)	Palace of Auburn Hills; 19,588	34–36
71	March 21	@ Brooklyn	L 96–98	Tobias Harris (24)	Andre Drummond (17)	Ish Smith (4)	Barclays Center; 14,343	34–37
72	March 22	@ Chicago	L 95–117	Harris & Morris (14)	Andre Drummond (17)	Ish Smith (7)	United Center; 21,503	34–38
73	March 24	@ Orlando	L 87–115	Jon Leuer (16)	Andre Drummond (14)	Darrun Hilliard (4)	Amway Center; 18,076	34–39
74	March 27	@ New York	L 95–109	Marcus Morris (20)	Andre Drummond (15)	Ish Smith (5)	Madison Square Garden; 19,812	34–40
75	March 28	Miami	L 96–97	Kentavious Caldwell-Pope (25)	Andre Drummond (13)	Ish Smith (6)	Palace of Auburn Hills; 17,160	34–41
76	March 30	Brooklyn	W 90–89	Marcus Morris (28)	Marcus Morris (13)	Ish Smith (5)	Palace of Auburn Hills; 15,804	35–41
77	March 31	@ Milwaukee	L 105–108 (OT)	Tobias Harris (23)	Andre Drummond (13)	Beno Udrih (8)	BMO Harris Bradley Center; 18,717	35–42

April : 2–3 (home: 0–2; road: 2–1)

Game	Date	Team	Score	High points	High rebounds	High assists	Location Attendance	Record
78	April 5	Toronto	L 102–105	Harris & Smith (16)	Andre Drummond (14)	Beno Udrih (8)	Palace of Auburn Hills; 17,578	35–43
79	April 7	@ Houston	W 114–109	Boban Marjanović (27)	Boban Marjanović (12)	Smith & Udrih (5)	Toyota Center; 18,055	36–43
80	April 9	@ Memphis	W 103–90	Bullock & Marjanović (14)	Andre Drummond (11)	Ish Smith (7)	FedExForum; 16,521	37–43
81	April 10	Washington	L 101–105	Tobias Harris (22)	Boban Marjanović (8)	Ish Smith (9)	Palace of Auburn Hills; 21,012	37–44
82	April 12	@ Orlando	L 109–113	Smith & Caldwell-Pope (20)	Andre Drummond (14)	Ish Smith (10)	Amway Center; 19,458	37–45

2016–17 season schedule

== Player statistics ==
Legend
GP	Games played	GS	Games started	MPG	Minutes per game
FG%	Field-goal percentage	3P%	3-point field-goal percentage	FT%	Free-throw percentage
RPG	Rebounds per game	APG	Assists per game	SPG	Steals per game
BPG	Blocks per game	PPG	Points per game

=== Season ===
Player	GP	GS	MPG	FG%	3P%	FT%	RPG	APG	SPG	BPG	PPG
Tobias Harris	82	48	31.3	.481	.347	.841	5.1	1.7	.72	.48	16.1
Reggie Jackson	52	50	27.4	.420	.359	.868	2.2	5.2	.67	.10	14.5
Marcus Morris	79	79	32.5	.418	.331	.784	4.6	2.0	.66	.32	14.0
Kentavious Caldwell-Pope	76	75	33.3	.399	.350	.832	3.3	2.5	1.18	.16	13.8
Andre Drummond	81	81	29.7	.530	.286	.386	13.8	1.1	1.53	1.10	13.6
Jon Leuer	75	34	25.9	.480	.293	.867	5.4	1.5	.41	.35	10.2
Ish Smith	81	32	24.1	.439	.267	.706	2.9	5.2	.75	.41	9.4
Beno Udrih	39	0	14.4	.467	.344	.941	1.5	3.4	.33	.00	5.8
Boban Marjanović	35	0	8.4	.545	.000	.810	3.7	.3	.17	.34	5.5
Aron Baynes	75	2	15.5	.513	.000	.840	4.4	.4	.23	.52	4.9
Reggie Bullock	31	5	15.1	.422	.384	.714	2.1	.9	.58	.10	4.5
Stanley Johnson	77	1	17.8	.353	.292	.679	2.5	1.4	.73	.31	4.4
Darrun Hilliard	39	1	9.8	.373	.261	.750	.8	.8	.28	.05	3.3
Henry Ellenson	19	2	7.7	.359	.294	.500	2.2	.4	.05	.7	3.2
Michael Gbinije	9	0	3.6	.100	.000	1.000	.3	.2	.00	.00	0.4

== Transactions ==
=== Overview ===
Players Added

Via draft

- Henry Ellenson
- Michael Gbinije

Via Trade

- Cameron Bairstow

Via free agency

- Jon Leuer
- Ish Smith
- Boban Marjanović
Players Lost

Via trade

- Spencer Dinwiddie
- Jodie Meeks

Via free agency

- Anthony Tolliver

=== Trades ===
June 17, 2016	To Detroit Pistons Cameron Bairstow	To Chicago Bulls Spencer Dinwiddie
June 29, 2016	To Detroit Pistons 2019 2nd Round Pick	To Orlando Magic Jodie Meeks

=== Free agency ===
==== Re-signed ====
Date	Player	Contract terms	Former team	Ref.
July 15	Andre Drummond	5-year contract worth $130 million	Detroit Pistons	

==== Additions ====
Date	Player	Contract terms	Former team	Ref.
July 8	Jon Leuer	4-year contract worth $42 million	Phoenix Suns	
July 8	Ish Smith	3-year contract worth $18 million	Philadelphia 76ers	
July 12	Boban Marjanović	3-year contract worth $21 million	San Antonio Spurs	

==== Subtractions ====
Date	Player	Contract terms	New team	Ref.
July 9	Anthony Tolliver	2-year contract worth $16 million	Sacramento Kings	
October 25	Lorenzo Brown	Waived	Zhejiang Golden Bulls	
