= Beno Udrih =

Slovenian basketball player (born 1982)

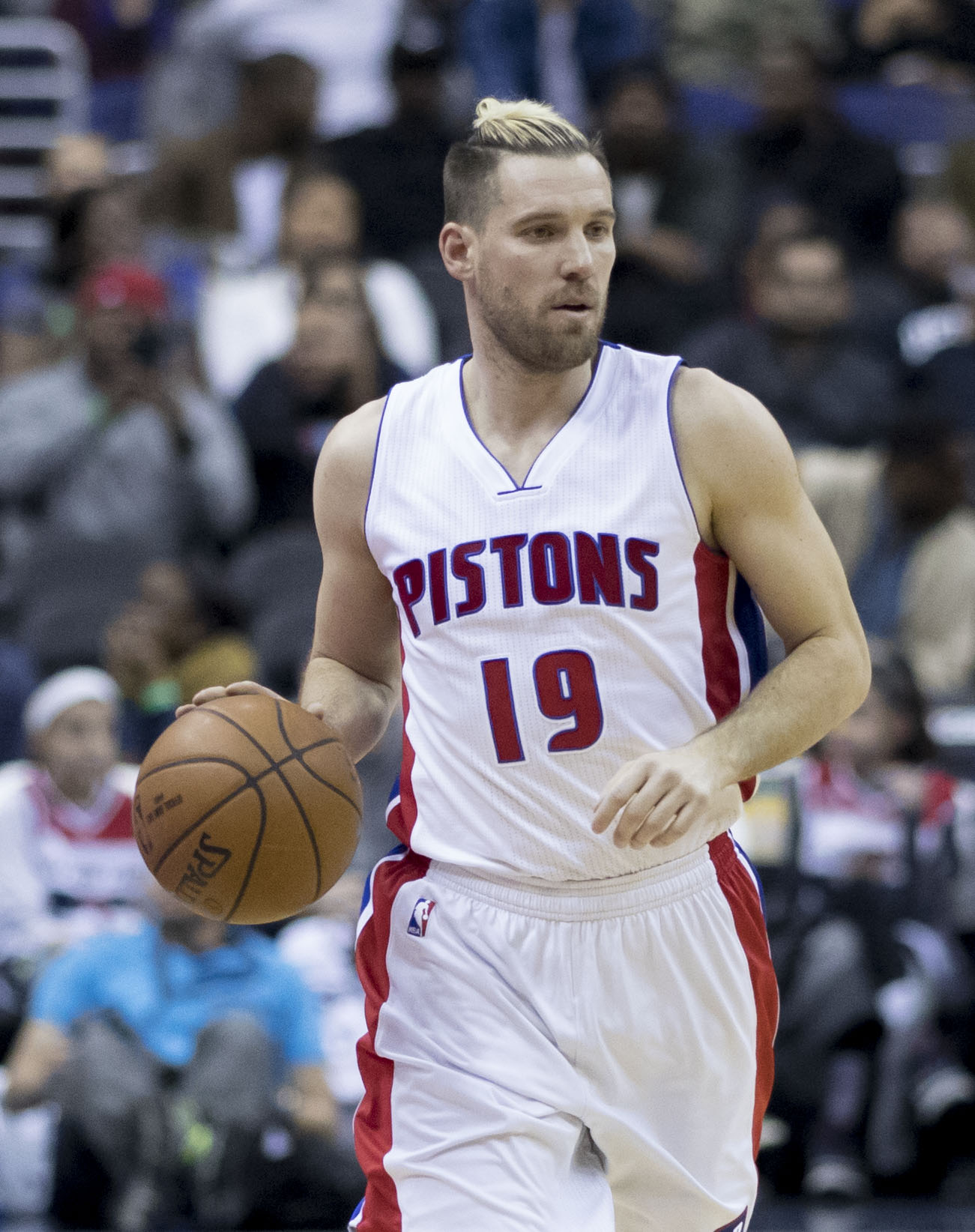
- Udrih with the Detroit Pistons in 2016

Personal information
- Born: 5 July 1982 (age 44) Celje, SR Slovenia, Yugoslavia
- Listed height: 6 ft 3 in (1.91 m)
- Listed weight: 205 lb (93 kg)

Career information
- NBA draft: 2004: 1st round, 28th overall pick
- Drafted by: San Antonio Spurs
- Playing career: 1997–2018
- Position: Point guard / shooting guard
- Number: 14, 19, 18
- Coaching career: 2020–present

Career history

Playing
- 1997–2000: Hopsi Polzela
- 2000–2002: Union Olimpija
- 2002–2003: Maccabi Tel Aviv
- 2003–2004: Avtodor Saratov
- 2004: Olimpia Milano
- 2004–2007: San Antonio Spurs
- 2007–2011: Sacramento Kings
- 2011–2013: Milwaukee Bucks
- 2013: Orlando Magic
- 2013–2014: New York Knicks
- 2014–2015: Memphis Grizzlies
- 2015–2016: Miami Heat
- 2016–2017: Detroit Pistons
- 2017–2018: Žalgiris Kaunas

Career highlights
- 2× NBA champion (2005, 2007); Lithuanian League champion (2018); King Mindaugas Cup winner (2018); Gloria Cup champion (2018); Israeli League champion (2003); Israeli Cup champion (2003); 2× Slovenian League champion (2001, 2002); 3× Slovenian Cup champion (2000–2002); Adriatic League champion (2002); Slovenian League Rookie of the Year (2000)

Career NBA statistics
- Points: 6,952 (8.4 ppg)
- Assists: 2,858 (3.4 rpg)
- Rebounds: 1,712 (2.1 apg)
- Stats at NBA.com
- Stats at Basketball Reference

Beno Udrih (born 5 July 1982) is a Slovenian former professional basketball player who was most recently the head coach of the Wisconsin Herd of the NBA G League. He previously played in the NBA for the San Antonio Spurs, Sacramento Kings, Milwaukee Bucks, Orlando Magic, New York Knicks, Memphis Grizzlies, Miami Heat and Detroit Pistons. During his time with the Spurs, Udrih won two NBA titles in 2005 and 2007.

== Early career ==
Udrih made his professional debut with a brief stint in the Slovenian Second Basketball League in 1997, followed by three seasons in the Slovenian Basketball League. He was named the 2000 Slovenian League Rookie of the Year, and has played for the senior Slovenian national team since that same year. He played for Union Olimpija, from 2000 to 2002, where he made great improvements, and played in the EuroLeague for the first time.

Udrih played for Maccabi Tel Aviv (Israel) in the 2002–2003 season. He split the 2003–2004 season between Avtodor Saratov (Russia) and Olimpia Milano (Italy).

Prior to his NBA debut, he appeared in the Southern California Summer Pro League for the Spurs, and also in three games with the Spurs squad in the 2004 Reebok Rocky Mountain Revue, averaging 10.3 points, 5 assists, 4.7 rebounds and 1.3 steals in 24.7 minutes per game.

== Professional career ==
=== San Antonio Spurs (2004–2007) ===
Udrih signed with the San Antonio Spurs in the summer of 2004 after being drafted with the 28th overall pick of the 2004 NBA draft, signing a 3-year, US$2.4 million contract, and served as a key backup for starting point guard Tony Parker. In Udrih's rookie season, he won a Rookie of the Month award. Following that achievement, he was selected for the Rookie Team for the Rookie Challenge during All Star Weekend. In the 2005 NBA playoffs he won the championship with the Spurs. However, Udrih's playing time dropped significantly in the 2005–06 season with the Spurs signing Nick Van Exel during the off-season, but increased again after the All-Star break due to an injury to Van Exel's elbow. In the following 2006–07 NBA season and playoffs (where the Spurs won another NBA championship) his minutes were very limited, as the Spurs signed veteran point guard Jacque Vaughn to back up Tony Parker.

=== Sacramento Kings (2007–2011) ===
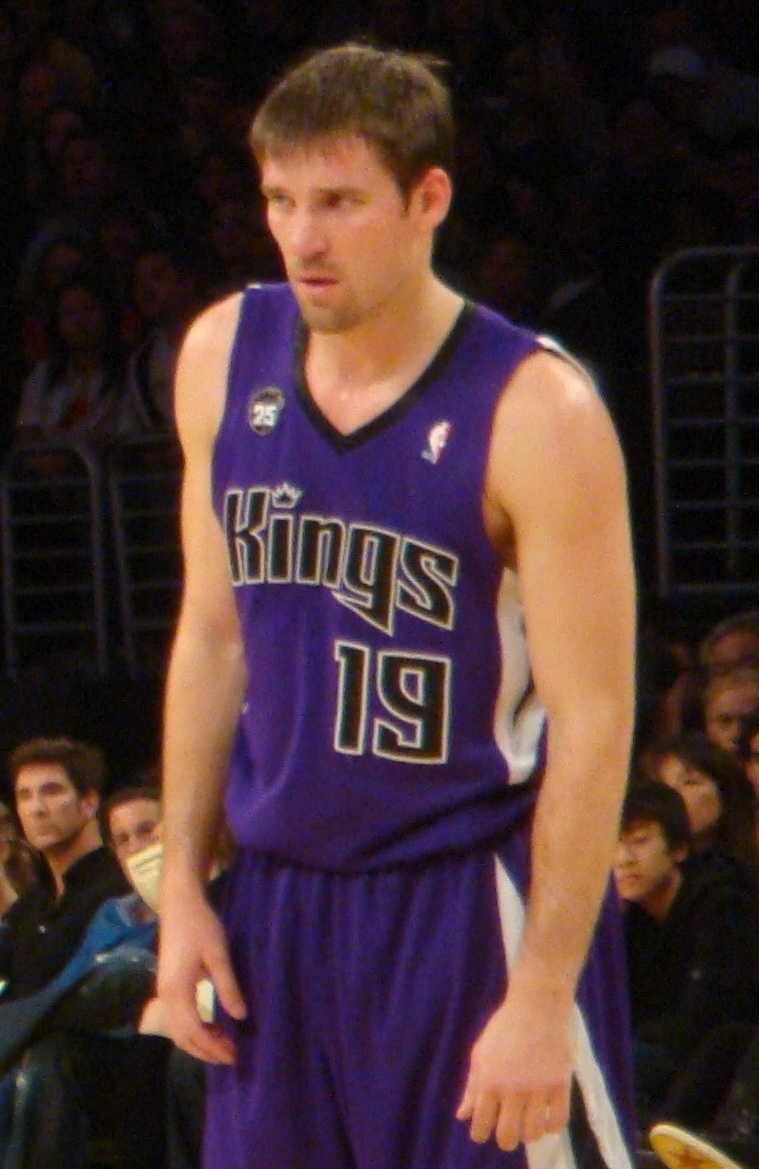
Udrih with the Kings in 2010

On 27 October 2007 Udrih was sent, along with cash considerations, by the Spurs to the Minnesota Timberwolves in exchange for a protected 2008 second-round draft pick. The Wolves immediately waived him. He was later signed by the Sacramento Kings as a fill in for starting point guard Mike Bibby, who was out with an injured thumb for an estimated two months. He stepped up well in his new role as starting point guard, scoring a career-high of 27 points on 26 November 2007 in a 112–99 win against his former team, the San Antonio Spurs. He averaged 12.8 points, 4.3 assists, 3.3 rebounds in 32 minutes per game in 65 games with the Kings in 2007–08.

On 1 July 2008, Udrih agreed to a 5-year contract with the Sacramento Kings after being courted by the Los Angeles Clippers.

=== Milwaukee Bucks (2011–2013) ===
On 23 June 2011, he was traded to the Milwaukee Bucks as part of a three-way deal among the Sacramento Kings and Charlotte Bobcats.

=== Orlando Magic (2013) ===
On 21 February 2013, Udrih was traded at the trade deadline to the Orlando Magic along with Tobias Harris and Doron Lamb in exchange for J. J. Redick, Gustavo Ayón, and Ish Smith.

=== New York Knicks (2013–2014) ===
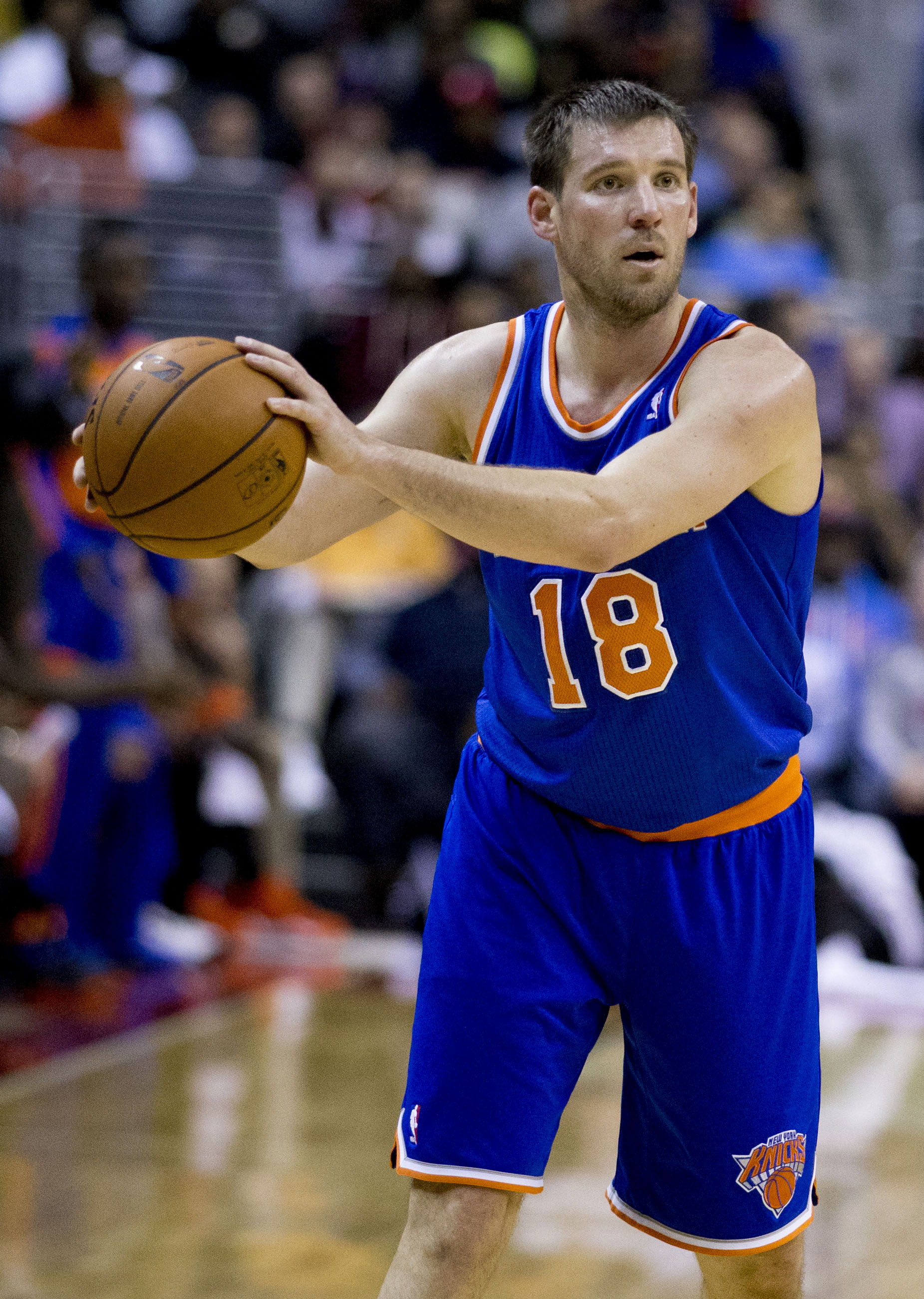
Udrih with the Knicks in 2013

On 8 August 2013, Udrih signed a one-year deal with the New York Knicks worth $1.27 million. On 24 February 2014 he was waived by the Knicks after they bought out his contract.

=== Memphis Grizzlies (2014–2015) ===
On 27 February 2014, Udrih was claimed off waivers by the Memphis Grizzlies. On 15 July 2014 Udrih re-signed with the Grizzlies to a multi-year deal.

=== Miami Heat (2015–2016) ===
On 10 November 2015, Udrih was traded, along with Jarnell Stokes, to the Miami Heat in exchange for Mario Chalmers and James Ennis. Two days later, he made his debut for the Heat in a 92–91 win over the Utah Jazz, recording two points, three rebounds and one assist in 17 minutes off the bench. On 24 February 2016 he was ruled out for three months after requiring surgery for a torn plantar plate in his right foot. He was subsequently waived by the Heat five days later.

Udrih re-signed with the Heat on 17 August 2016, but was waived on October 22 prior to the start of the 2016–17 regular season.

=== Detroit Pistons (2016–2017) ===
On 24 October 2016, Udrih was claimed off waivers by the Detroit Pistons. He re-signed with the Pistons on 25 September 2017, but was waived on 14 October 2017 prior to the start of the 2017–18 season.

=== Žalgiris Kaunas (2017–2018) ===
On 24 December 2017, Udrih returned to Europe, signing with the Lithuanian club Žalgiris Kaunas until the end of the season.

On 27 November 2021, Udrih officially announced his retirement.

== Coaching career ==
On 25 January 2020, it was reported that Udrih had been hired by the Westchester Knicks as assistant coach. On 16 November 2020 the New Orleans Pelicans announced that they hired Udrih as player development coach.

On 15 August 2023, Udrih was named head coach of the Wisconsin Herd. He stepped down following the 2025–26 NBA G League season.

== Career statistics ==
Legend
GP	Games played	GS	Games started	MPG	Minutes per game
FG%	Field-goal percentage	3P%	3-point field-goal percentage	FT%	Free-throw percentage
RPG	Rebounds per game	APG	Assists per game	SPG	Steals per game
BPG	Blocks per game	PPG	Points per game	PIR	Performance index rating
**Bold**	Career high

=== NBA ===
†	Denotes seasons in which Udrih won the NBA

==== Regular season ====
Year	Team	GP	GS	MPG	FG%	3P%	FT%	RPG	APG	SPG	BPG	PPG
2004–05†	San Antonio	**80**	2	14.4	.444	.408	.753	1.0	1.9	.5	.1	5.9
2005–06	San Antonio	54	3	10.9	.455	.343	.780	1.0	1.7	.3	.0	5.1
2006–07†	San Antonio	73	1	13.0	.369	.287	.883	1.1	1.7	.4	.0	4.7
2007–08	Sacramento	65	51	32.0	.463	.387	.850	3.3	4.3	.9	**.2**	12.8
2008–09	Sacramento	73	**72**	31.1	.461	.310	.820	3.0	4.7	1.1	**.2**	11.0
2009–10	Sacramento	79	41	31.4	.493	.377	.837	2.8	4.7	1.1	.1	12.9
2010–11	Sacramento	79	64	**34.6**	**.500**	.357	.864	**3.4**	4.9	**1.2**	.1	**13.7**
2011–12	Milwaukee	59	0	18.3	.440	.288	.709	1.7	3.8	.6	.0	5.9
2012–13	Milwaukee	39	0	18.4	.475	.265	.727	2.0	3.5	.4	.1	6.7
2012–13	Orlando	27	9	27.3	.408	.396	.857	2.3	**6.1**	.9	.0	10.2
2013–14	New York	31	12	19.0	.425	.425	.833	1.8	3.5	.7	.1	5.6
2013–14	Memphis	10	0	5.5	.556	**1.000**	.833	.2	.6	.1	.1	2.7
2014–15	Memphis	79	12	18.9	.487	.268	.853	1.8	2.8	.6	.1	7.7
2015–16	Memphis	8	0	15.0	.435	.364	**1.000**	1.1	3.3	.4	.1	5.9
2015–16	Miami	36	5	16.3	.434	.333	.882	1.8	2.5	.3	—	4.4
2016–17	Detroit	39	0	14.4	.467	.344	.941	1.5	3.4	.3	.0	5.8
Career		831	272	21.9	.463	.349	.833	2.1	3.4	.7	.1	8.4

==== Playoffs ====
Year	Team	GP	GS	MPG	FG%	3P%	FT%	RPG	APG	SPG	BPG	PPG
2005†	San Antonio	**21**	0	11.5	.359	.270	.857	.8	1.0	.4	.0	3.7
2006	San Antonio	7	0	6.7	.333	.167	.800	.6	1.1	—	—	3.6
2007†	San Antonio	8	0	2.5	.000	.000	**1.000**	.1	.1	—	—	.3
2014	Memphis	7	0	16.4	**.467**	**.333**	.692	1.7	1.7	.4	—	**7.9**
2015	Memphis	10	0	**17.5**	.425	.250	.833	**2.0**	**2.1**	**.5**	—	7.6
Career		53	0	11.3	.388	.260	.804	1.0	1.2	.3	.0	4.5

=== EuroLeague ===
Year	Team	GP	GS	MPG	FG%	3P%	FT%	RPG	APG	SPG	BPG	PPG	PIR
2000–01	Union Olimpija	13	0	24.6	.462	.250	.593	2.2	2.2	1.2	**.1**	7.2	5.6
2001–02	Union Olimpija	19	9	**27.3**	**.478**	**.339**	.766	**2.5**	2.6	**1.8**	**.1**	**10.8**	**10.8**
2002–03	Maccabi	**20**	**16**	24.3	.466	.269	**.806**	1.9	**2.8**	1.3	**.1**	8.4	9.4
2017–18	Žalgiris	17	0	11.5	.411	.250	.500	1.5	1.8	.4	—	3.1	3.0
Career		69	25	22.0	.462	.300	.733	2.0	2.4	1.2	.1	7.5	7.5

== Personal life ==
Udrih comes from a family of basketball players. His father, Silvo, played for Zlatorog Laško, and his brother, Samo Udrih, is also a professional basketball player.

== See also ==
- List of European basketball players in the United States
