= 2016–17 Golden State Warriors season =

Professional basketball team season (won NBA championship)

- NBA champions
- Conference champions
- Division champions
- Head coach: Steve Kerr; Mike Brown (Note: Mike Brown served as interim head coach during the playoffs from April 22 until June 1 (Game 3 of the first round until Game 1 of the Finals), while Steve Kerr recovered from back surgery complications. He led the Warriors to an 12–0 record.)(interim)
- General manager: Bob Myers
- Owners: Joe Lacob; Peter Guber
- Arena: Oracle Arena

Results
- Record: 67–15 (.817)
- Place: Division: 1st (Pacific); Conference: 1st (Western)
- Playoff finish: NBA champions (Defeated Cavaliers 4–1)
- Stats at Basketball Reference

Local media
- Television: Comcast SportsNet Bay Area
- Radio: 95.7 The Game

The 2016–17 Golden State Warriors season was the 71st season of the franchise in the National Basketball Association (NBA), and its 55th in the San Francisco Bay Area. In the climax season of the Warriors’ dynasty, they won their fifth NBA championship, and second in three seasons, setting the best postseason record in NBA history by going 16–1. They entered the season as runners-up in the 2016 NBA Finals, after a record breaking regular-season in 2015–16. With the landmark acquisition of free agent and 7-time NBA All-Star Kevin Durant in the offseason, the Warriors were hailed as a "superteam" by the media and fans, forming a new All-Star "Fantastic Four" of Kevin Durant, Stephen Curry, Klay Thompson and Draymond Green. The Warriors broke over 20 NBA records on their way to equaling their 2014–15 regular-season record of 67–15, their second most wins in franchise history.

In the postseason, Golden State clinched the top seed in the playoffs for the third successive year. The Warriors swept the Portland Trail Blazers 4–0 in the first round, the Utah Jazz 4–0 in the Western Conference semi-finals and the San Antonio Spurs 4–0 in the Western Conference Finals. The Warriors claimed their fifth NBA Championship by beating the Cleveland Cavaliers 4–1 in the NBA Finals, the first time in NBA history two teams have met for a third consecutive year. Golden State became the first team ever to start 15–0 in the playoffs and their fifteen straight wins were the most consecutive postseason wins in NBA history. They also became the first team in all four major professional sports in America to start 15–0 in the postseason. The Warriors set the best playoff record in NBA history by going 16–1 (.941).

Golden State won the Pacific Division title and Western Conference Championship for the third consecutive season. The Warriors became only the second team in NBA history to win 30 road games in back-to-back seasons, joining the 1995–96 and 1996–97 Chicago Bulls. Stephen Curry set numerous three-point NBA records this season; including most three-pointers made in a single game with 13 and most consecutive games (regular-season and postseason combined) with a made three-pointer with 196. Curry also surpassed 300 three-pointers in the regular-season for the second time in NBA history; he finished with 324.

Draymond Green won the Defensive Player of the Year Award at the NBA Awards, the first time a Warrior has won it. Kevin Durant won the NBA Finals MVP award, the third time a Warrior has won it. The Warriors won the Team of the Year Award at the Espy Awards. Durant, Stephen Curry, Klay Thompson and Draymond Green were all named to the All-Star Game, the first time Golden State have had four All-Stars and just the eighth time in NBA history a single team has had four players in the game. The Warriors were the only team with multiple players named to the All-NBA Team this season, with Curry, Durant and Green all selected. Bob Myers won the Executive of the Year Award, his second win in three years. The Warriors became the fastest team in NBA history to clinch a playoff berth since the playoff format changed in 1984.

== Season synopsis ==
=== Preseason ===
The 2016 NBA draft was held on June 23, 2016, at the Barclays Center in Brooklyn. The Warriors chose center Damian Jones out of Vanderbilt with the 30th pick of the first round. They also acquired the draft rights of swingman Patrick McCaw, the 38th pick of the second round. Warriors forwards Harrison Barnes and Draymond Green and guard Klay Thompson were selected to participate on the 2016 USA Basketball National Team that competed in the 2016 Olympic Games. The Warriors were the only team with three representatives on the Olympic squad. Stephen Curry withdrew from selection due to injury.

On July 4, seven time All-star forward Kevin Durant announced he was leaving the Oklahoma City Thunder to join the Warriors. To clear cap space for Durant, the Warriors traded Andrew Bogut to the Dallas Mavericks and didn't match offers for five of their out of contract free agents, losing Harrison Barnes to the Dallas Mavericks, Brandon Rush to the Minnesota Timberwolves, Leandro Barbosa to the Phoenix Suns, Festus Ezeli to the Portland Trail Blazers and Marreese Speights to the Los Angeles Clippers. Golden State added veteran big men Zaza Pachulia and David West to their roster and retained Ian Clark, James Michael McAdoo and Anderson Varejão. The Warriors added Mike Brown as assistant coach on July 6, replacing Luke Walton, who left to take over as the Los Angeles Lakers head coach.

On August 21, the United States beat Serbia 96–66 at the Rio Summer Olympics to win the gold medal. Kevin Durant, Klay Thompson and Draymond Green joined Chris Mullin (in 1992), as the only Warriors players to capture Olympic gold medals. Durant led the team by averaging 19.4 points during Team USA's 8–0 run to victory.

The Warriors lost their opening preseason game against the Toronto Raptors on October 1, they then beat the Clippers, Kings, Nuggets, Lakers (twice) and Trail Blazers, to finish preparation for the season with a 6–1 record. Kevin Durant led the team in scoring, averaging 20.9 points per game, followed by Stephen Curry (19.7) and Klay Thompson (18.0). On October 20, Golden State finalized their 15-man roster, with the addition of free agent center JaVale McGee.

=== Regular season ===
The Warriors opened the season on October 25, 2016, with a 29-point home loss to the San Antonio Spurs in which Kawhi Leonard scored a career-high 35 points. They would respond by winning their next 4 games, including a 26-point victory over the Oklahoma City Thunder at home on November 3. This marked the first and highly anticipated meeting between former teammates Kevin Durant and Russell Westbrook. Durant scored 39 points in the win, the most by any player debuting against his former team.

After having his streak of consecutive games with a three-pointer come to an end the previous game, Stephen Curry set a new record of 13 three-pointers made in a single game during a victory over the New Orleans Pelicans on November 7.

On January 26, Kevin Durant, Stephen Curry, Klay Thompson and Draymond Green were all named to the All-Star Game, the first time Golden State have had four All-Stars and just the eighth time in NBA history a single team has had four players in the game. Golden State's Steve Kerr coached the Western Conference team.

On February 25, with the Warriors winning against the Brooklyn Nets, they secured a playoff berth for the fifth consecutive season, the first team in the league for the second consecutive season, and the fastest in the NBA history, beating out their record the previous season by two days.

=== Postseason ===
In the playoffs, the Warriors clinched the top seed in the playoffs for the third successive year. The Warriors swept the Portland Trail Blazers in their first round, 4 games to 0, even when Kevin Durant was out for Games 2 and 3. In the semi-finals round, the Warriors were up against the Utah Jazz for the first time since the 2007 Semi-finals round. In Game 3 of the series, Kevin Durant scored a playoff-high 38 points with the Warriors as he led the Warriors towards a 3–0 record against the Jazz. In Game 4, the Warriors opened up with 39 points in the first quarter as Curry and Thompson combined for 51 points to lead the Warriors to a complete sweep against the Jazz. Green also recorded a triple-double of 17 points, 10 rebounds and 11 assists for the Warriors. In the conference finals round, the Warriors faced the Spurs. In Game 1 of the series, the Warriors rallied back from 25 points down as they beat the Spurs, 113–111, to keep the postseason record unbeaten with 9–0. In Game 3, the Warriors defeated the Spurs, 120–108, to take a 3–0 series lead and improved to 11–0 for the postseason, becoming the third team in NBA History to start a postseason with 11–0 record, joining the 1988-89 Lakers and 2000-01 Lakers. The Warriors also swept the Spurs, thanks to Curry's 36 points, to reach their third NBA Finals in a row for the first time in franchise history. They also improved to 12–0 record in the postseason, the best record in NBA History. The Warriors won its fifth NBA Championship by defeating the Cleveland Cavaliers 4–1 in the Finals; it was the first time in NBA history two teams have met for a third consecutive year. The Warriors are the first team ever to start 15–0 in the playoffs and their fifteen-game win streak to start the playoffs set the record for most consecutive postseason wins in NBA history. Their 16–1 record is the best playoff record in NBA history, besting the 2000–01 Los Angeles Lakers.

== Records ==
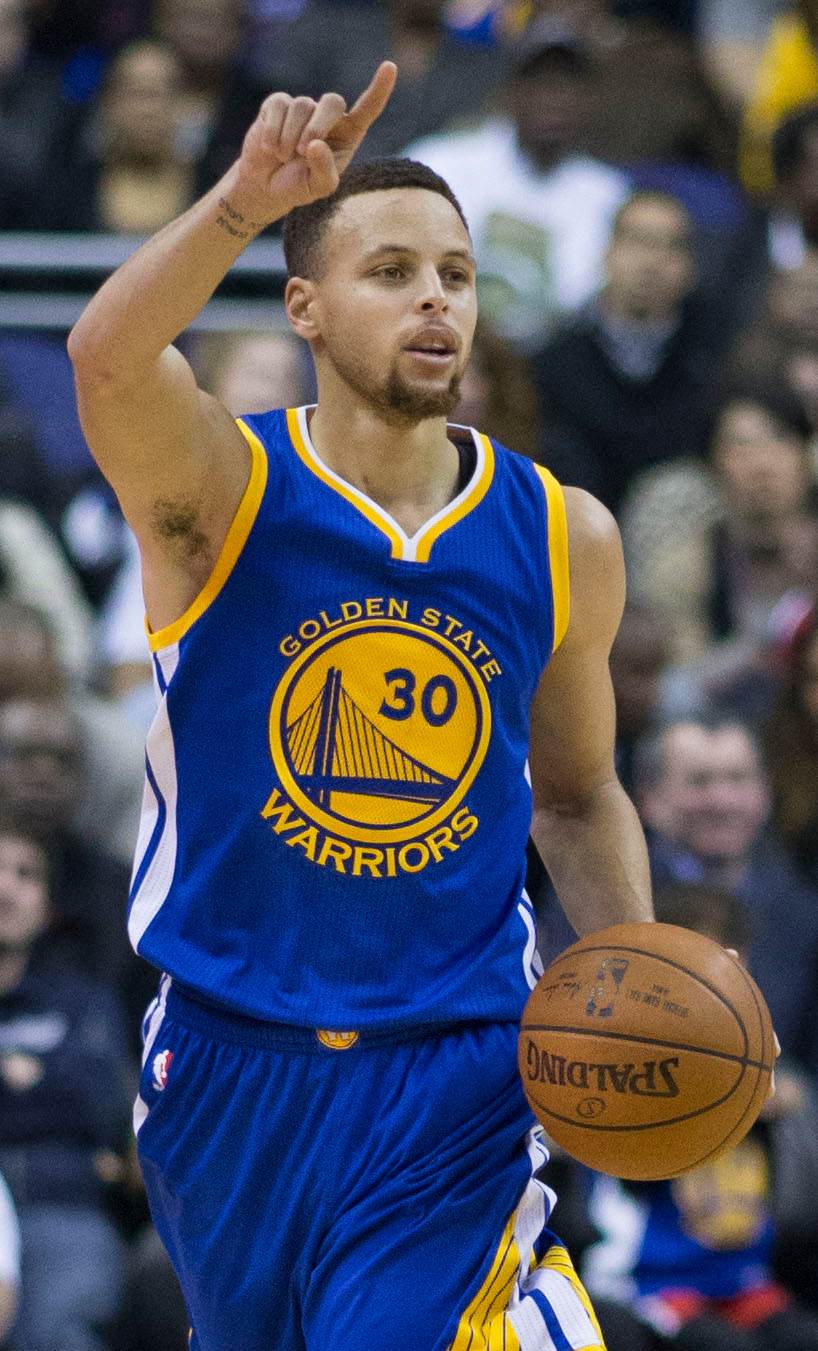
Stephen Curry broke the NBA record for most three-pointers made in a single game this season, with 13.

=== NBA records ===
As of June 12, 2017.

==== Individual ====
- Most three-pointers made in a single game: 13 (Stephen Curry, previous record of 12 held jointly by Curry, Kobe Bryant, and Donyell Marshall)
- Most consecutive regular-season games with twenty or more points: 72 (Kevin Durant, joint-fourth with Michael Jordan on all time NBA streak list. Streak ended November 10, 2016 when Durant scored 18 against the Denver Nuggets)
- Most consecutive games (regular-season and postseason combined) with a made three-pointer: 196 (Stephen Curry, streak ended on November 4, 2016, against the Los Angeles Lakers, with Curry going 0 for 10 from three-point range)
- Most consecutive regular-season games with a made three-pointer: 157 (Stephen Curry, previous record of 127 held by Kyle Korver)
- Most consecutive regular-season games with a made three-pointer on the road: 117 (Stephen Curry)
- Most consecutive playoff games with a made three-pointer: 75 (Stephen Curry)
- First player to score 60 points in a game in under 30 minutes: Klay Thompson scored 60 points in 29 minutes against the Indiana Pacers on December 5, 2016, the first player to do this in the shot clock era (since 1954–55)
- First player to record a triple-double while scoring fewer than ten points: Draymond Green (12 rebounds, 10 assists, 10 steals)
- Most three-pointers made in a four-game playoff series: 21 (Stephen Curry, against the San Antonio Spurs)

==== Team ====
- Best record in NBA postseason: 16–1 (.941, bettering the 2000–01 Los Angeles Lakers 15–1)
- Best start in the postseason: 15–0
- Longest winning streak in the postseason: 15 games
- Most games without back-to-back losses in regular-season: 146 (from April 9, 2015 – March 2, 2017). Previous record of 95 was held by the Utah Jazz.
- First team to have four players hit four three-pointers in a single game: Curry, Durant, Klay Thompson and Draymond Green all hit four three-pointers, first time in NBA history a team has done this.
- Most combined three-point attempts in a single game: 88 (Both the Warriors and the Houston Rockets took 44 attempts each on December 1, 2016.)
- Most games with a 40-point winning margin or higher in regular-season: 3 (tied with five other teams for NBA record)
- Most players in the All-Star Game: Four, equalling the record shared by seven other teams in NBA history.
- Most points in a playoff game, first quarter: 45 (tied with three other teams)
- Playoff point-differential per game entering NBA Finals: +16.3 (largest winning margin in NBA history)
- Fewest turnovers in an NBA Finals game: 4 (Game 1, tied with two other teams)
- Most three-pointers in an NBA Finals quarter: 9 (Game 3)
- Most three-pointers in an NBA Finals half: 12 (Game 3)

=== Franchise records ===
==== Individual ====
- Most steals in a game: 10 (Draymond Green, NBA record is 11)
- Most consecutive games with a made three-pointer at home: 107 (Stephen Curry, NBA record is 132 by Kyle Korver)
- Only Warriors players to score 60 points or more in a game: Klay Thompson scored 60 points against the Indiana Pacers on December 5, 2016. He joins Wilt Chamberlain, Steph Curry, Rick Barry, and Joe Fulks as the only players in franchise history to score 60 or more points in a game.

==== Team ====
- Point-differential per game in regular-season: +11.63 (fourth highest in NBA history)
- Most games with 30+ assists in a regular-season: 50 (previous best was 43 set in 2015–16 season. The NBA record is 52 by the Los Angeles Lakers in the 1984–85 season)
- Most assists in a game: 47 (most assists in a game in the NBA since the Phoenix Suns had 47 in the 1991–92 season)
- Most assists per game in regular-season: 30.4 (fifth highest in NBA history)
- Most assists in a regular-season: 2,491 (fifth most in NBA history)
- Most games in a row with 30+ assists: 10 (the Charlotte Hornets hold the NBA record with 13 set in 1989)
- Most games in a season with 40+ assists: 3 (most in the NBA since the 1996–97 Chicago Bulls had 3)
- Most three-pointers attempted in a game: 48 (against the Charlotte Hornets on February 1, 2017. The Warriors shot 21-of-48 (.438)
- Fewest turnovers in a playoff game: 7 (three times this postseason, against the Portland Trail Blazers in Game 3 and Utah Jazz in Game 1 and Game 3, equaling a mark they set on April 8, 1967, at St. Louis)
- Most assists in a half in the postseason: 23 (in Game 2 against the San Antonio Spurs)
- Playoff point-differential per game: +13.5 (second largest winning margin in NBA history)

== Draft ==
| Round | Pick | Player | Position | Nationality | School / club team |
|---|---|---|---|---|---|
| 1 | 30 | Damian Jones | C | United States | Vanderbilt (Jr.) |

== Roster ==
2016–17 Golden State Warriors roster
Players

| Pos. | No. | Player | Height | Weight | DOB | From |
|---|---|---|---|---|---|---|
| F | 22 | Matt Barnes | 6 ft 7 in (2.01 m) | 226 lb (103 kg) | 1980-03-09 | UCLA |
| G | 21 | Ian Clark | 6 ft 3 in (1.91 m) | 175 lb (79 kg) | 1991-03-07 | Belmont |
| G | 30 | Stephen Curry | 6 ft 3 in (1.91 m) | 190 lb (86 kg) | 1988-03-14 | Davidson |
| F | 35 | Kevin Durant | 6 ft 10 in (2.08 m) | 240 lb (109 kg) | 1988-09-29 | Texas |
| F | 23 | Draymond Green | 6 ft 7 in (2.01 m) | 230 lb (104 kg) | 1990-03-04 | Michigan State |
| G/F | 9 | Andre Iguodala | 6 ft 6 in (1.98 m) | 215 lb (98 kg) | 1984-01-28 | Arizona |
| C | 15 | Damian Jones | 7 ft 0 in (2.13 m) | 245 lb (111 kg) | 1995-06-30 | Vanderbilt |
| G | 34 | Shaun Livingston | 6 ft 7 in (2.01 m) | 192 lb (87 kg) | 1985-09-11 | Peoria Central HS (IL) |
| F | 5 | Kevon Looney | 6 ft 9 in (2.06 m) | 220 lb (100 kg) | 1996-02-06 | UCLA |
| F | 20 | James Michael McAdoo | 6 ft 9 in (2.06 m) | 240 lb (109 kg) | 1993-01-04 | North Carolina |
| G | 0 | Patrick McCaw | 6 ft 7 in (2.01 m) | 185 lb (84 kg) | 1995-10-25 | UNLV |
| C | 1 | JaVale McGee | 7 ft 0 in (2.13 m) | 270 lb (122 kg) | 1988-01-19 | Nevada |
| C | 27 | Zaza Pachulia | 6 ft 11 in (2.11 m) | 275 lb (125 kg) | 1984-02-10 | Georgia |
| G | 11 | Klay Thompson | 6 ft 7 in (2.01 m) | 215 lb (98 kg) | 1990-02-08 | Washington State |
| F | 3 | David West | 6 ft 9 in (2.06 m) | 250 lb (113 kg) | 1980-08-29 | Xavier |

Coaches
Head coach
- Steve Kerr
Assistant(s)
- Ron Adams
- Jarron Collins
- Mike Brown (associate HC)
- Chris DeMarco (player development)
- Bruce Fraser (player development)
- Willie Green (player development)

Legend
- (DP) Unsigned draft pick
- (FA) Free agent
- (S) Suspended
- (DL) On assignment to D-League affiliate
- Injured

Roster
Updated: May 31, 2017

== Standings ==
=== Division ===
| Pacific Division | W | L | PCT | GB | Home | Road | Div | GP |
|---|---|---|---|---|---|---|---|---|
| z – Golden State Warriors | 67 | 15 | .817 | – | 36‍–‍5 | 31‍–‍10 | 14–2 | 82 |
| x – Los Angeles Clippers | 51 | 31 | .622 | 16.0 | 29‍–‍12 | 22‍–‍19 | 10–6 | 82 |
| e – Sacramento Kings | 32 | 50 | .390 | 35.0 | 17‍–‍24 | 15‍–‍26 | 7–9 | 82 |
| e – Los Angeles Lakers | 26 | 56 | .317 | 41.0 | 17‍–‍24 | 9‍–‍32 | 6–10 | 82 |
| e – Phoenix Suns | 24 | 58 | .293 | 43.0 | 15‍–‍26 | 9‍–‍32 | 3–13 | 82 |

=== Conference ===
Western Conference
| # | Team | W | L | PCT | GB | GP |
|---|---|---|---|---|---|---|
| 1 | z – Golden State Warriors * | 67 | 15 | .817 | – | 82 |
| 2 | y – San Antonio Spurs * | 61 | 21 | .744 | 6.0 | 82 |
| 3 | x – Houston Rockets | 55 | 27 | .671 | 12.0 | 82 |
| 4 | x – Los Angeles Clippers | 51 | 31 | .622 | 16.0 | 82 |
| 5 | y – Utah Jazz * | 51 | 31 | .622 | 16.0 | 82 |
| 6 | x – Oklahoma City Thunder | 47 | 35 | .573 | 20.0 | 82 |
| 7 | x – Memphis Grizzlies | 43 | 39 | .524 | 24.0 | 82 |
| 8 | x – Portland Trail Blazers | 41 | 41 | .500 | 26.0 | 82 |
| 9 | e – Denver Nuggets | 40 | 42 | .488 | 27.0 | 82 |
| 10 | e – New Orleans Pelicans | 34 | 48 | .415 | 33.0 | 82 |
| 11 | e – Dallas Mavericks | 33 | 49 | .402 | 34.0 | 82 |
| 12 | e – Sacramento Kings | 32 | 50 | .390 | 35.0 | 82 |
| 13 | e – Minnesota Timberwolves | 31 | 51 | .378 | 36.0 | 82 |
| 14 | e – Los Angeles Lakers | 26 | 56 | .317 | 41.0 | 82 |
| 15 | e – Phoenix Suns | 24 | 58 | .293 | 43.0 | 82 |

== Game log ==
=== Pre-season ===
2016 pre-season game log
Total: 6–1 (Home: 3–0; Road: 3–1)
Pre-season: 6–1 (home: 3–0; road: 3–1)

| Game | Date | Team | Score | High points | High rebounds | High assists | Location Attendance | Record |
|---|---|---|---|---|---|---|---|---|
| 1 | October 1 | @ Toronto | L 93–97 | Klay Thompson (16) | David West (6) | Patrick McCaw (4) | Rogers Arena; 19,000 | 0–1 |
| 2 | October 4 | L.A. Clippers | W 120–75 | Klay Thompson (30) | Draymond Green (9) | Kevin Durant (7) | Oracle Arena; 19,596 | 1–1 |
| 3 | October 6 | Sacramento | W 105–96 | Kevin Durant (25) | Zaza Pachulia (6) | Green, Curry (5) | SAP Center; 18,234 | 2–1 |
| 4 | October 14 | @ Denver | W 129–128 (OT) | Stephen Curry (22) | Looney, Curry (9) | West, Curry (4) | Pepsi Center; 10,104 | 3–1 |
| 5 | October 15 | @ L.A. Lakers | W 112–107 | Klay Thompson (24) | Kevon Looney (9) | Patrick McCaw (5) | T-Mobile Arena; 15,821 | 4–1 |
| 6 | October 19 | @ L.A. Lakers | W 123–112 | Stephen Curry (32) | Draymond Green (8) | Klay Thompson (8) | Valley View Casino Center; 13,669 | 5–1 |
| 7 | October 21 | Portland | W 107–96 | Stephen Curry (35) | Draymond Green (11) | Green, Durant (6) | Oracle Arena; 19,596 | 6–1 |

2016–17 season schedule

=== Regular season ===
2016–17 game log
Total: 67–15 (Home: 36–5; Road: 31–10)
October: 2–1 (home: 0–1; road: 2–0)

| Game | Date | Team | Score | High points | High rebounds | High assists | Location Attendance | Record |
|---|---|---|---|---|---|---|---|---|
| 1 | October 25 | San Antonio | L 100–129 | Kevin Durant (27) | Draymond Green (12) | Draymond Green (6) | Oracle Arena; 19,596 | 0–1 |
| 2 | October 28 | @ New Orleans | W 122–114 | Kevin Durant (30) | Kevin Durant (17) | Stephen Curry (8) | Smoothie King Center; 18,217 | 1–1 |
| 3 | October 30 | @ Phoenix | W 106–100 | Kevin Durant (37) | Draymond Green (13) | Draymond Green (9) | Talking Stick Resort Arena; 17,011 | 2–1 |

November : 14–1 (home: 7–0; road: 7–1)

| Game | Date | Team | Score | High points | High rebounds | High assists | Location Attendance | Record |
|---|---|---|---|---|---|---|---|---|
| 4 | November 1 | @ Portland | W 127–104 | Stephen Curry (28) | Draymond Green (8) | Draymond Green (9) | Moda Center; 19,393 | 3−1 |
| 5 | November 3 | Oklahoma City | W 122–96 | Kevin Durant (39) | Green, Pachulia (10) | Stephen Curry (7) | Oracle Arena; 19,596 | 4−1 |
| 6 | November 4 | @ L.A. Lakers | L 97–117 | Kevin Durant (27) | Draymond Green (9) | Stephen Curry (10) | Staples Center; 18,997 | 4−2 |
| 7 | November 7 | New Orleans | W 116–106 | Stephen Curry (46) | Draymond Green (12) | Draymond Green (11) | Oracle Arena; 19,596 | 5−2 |
| 8 | November 9 | Dallas | W 116–95 | Kevin Durant (28) | Durant, Green (10) | Stephen Curry (6) | Oracle Arena; 19,596 | 6−2 |
| 9 | November 10 | @ Denver | W 125–101 | Stephen Curry (33) | Durant, Green (9) | Stephen Curry (6) | Pepsi Center; 17,569 | 7−2 |
| 10 | November 13 | Phoenix | W 133–120 | Curry, Thompson (30) | Kevin Durant (9) | Draymond Green (11) | Oracle Arena; 19,596 | 8−2 |
| 11 | November 16 | @ Toronto | W 127–121 | Stephen Curry (35) | Kevin Durant (9) | Stephen Curry (7) | Air Canada Centre; 21,050 | 9−2 |
| 12 | November 18 | @ Boston | W 104–88 | Klay Thompson (28) | Zaza Pachulia (13) | Green, Curry (8) | TD Garden; 18,624 | 10−2 |
| 13 | November 19 | @ Milwaukee | W 124–121 | Kevin Durant (33) | Zaza Pachulia (10) | 3 players tied (5) | BMO Harris Bradley Center; 18,717 | 11−2 |
| 14 | November 21 | @ Indiana | W 120–83 | Klay Thompson (25) | Kevin Durant (11) | Draymond Green (7) | Bankers Life Fieldhouse; 17,923 | 12−2 |
| 15 | November 23 | L.A. Lakers | W 149–106 | Stephen Curry (31) | Draymond Green (9) | Draymond Green (11) | Oracle Arena; 19,596 | 13−2 |
| 16 | November 25 | @ L.A. Lakers | W 109–85 | Kevin Durant (29) | Draymond Green (8) | Kevin Durant (9) | Staples Center; 18,995 | 14−2 |
| 17 | November 26 | Minnesota | W 115–102 | Stephen Curry (34) | Kevin Durant (10) | Stephen Curry (6) | Oracle Arena; 19,596 | 15−2 |
| 18 | November 28 | Atlanta | W 105–100 | Durant, Curry (25) | Kevin Durant (14) | Draymond Green (7) | Oracle Arena; 19,596 | 16−2 |

December : 13–3 (home: 7–1; road: 6–2)

| Game | Date | Team | Score | High points | High rebounds | High assists | Location Attendance | Record |
|---|---|---|---|---|---|---|---|---|
| 19 | December 1 | Houston | L 127–132 (2OT) | Kevin Durant (39) | Draymond Green (15) | Draymond Green (9) | Oracle Arena; 19,596 | 16−3 |
| 20 | December 3 | Phoenix | W 138–109 | Stephen Curry (31) | Andre Iguodala (6) | Draymond Green (14) | Oracle Arena; 19,596 | 17−3 |
| 21 | December 5 | Indiana | W 142–106 | Klay Thompson (60) | Durant, McGee (8) | Stephen Curry (11) | Oracle Arena; 19,596 | 18−3 |
| 22 | December 7 | @ L.A. Clippers | W 115–98 | Klay Thompson (24) | Kevin Durant (8) | Kevin Durant (7) | Staples Center; 19,239 | 19−3 |
| 23 | December 8 | @ Utah | W 106–99 | Stephen Curry (26) | Kevin Durant (11) | Draymond Green (8) | Vivint Smart Home Arena; 19,911 | 20−3 |
| 24 | December 10 | @ Memphis | L 89–110 | Kevin Durant (21) | Stephen Curry (8) | David West (4) | FedExForum; 18,119 | 20−4 |
| 25 | December 11 | @ Minnesota | W 116–108 | Klay Thompson (30) | Kevin Durant (8) | Stephen Curry (9) | Target Center; 18,452 | 21−4 |
| 26 | December 13 | @ New Orleans | W 113–109 | Stephen Curry (30) | Draymond Green (14) | Draymond Green (10) | Smoothie King Center; 17,789 | 22−4 |
| 27 | December 15 | New York | W 103–90 | Klay Thompson (25) | Kevin Durant (14) | Durant, Curry (8) | Oracle Arena; 19,596 | 23−4 |
| 28 | December 17 | Portland | W 135–90 | Kevin Durant (34) | Draymond Green (12) | Draymond Green (13) | Oracle Arena; 19,596 | 24−4 |
| 29 | December 20 | Utah | W 104–74 | Stephen Curry (25) | Draymond Green (11) | 4 players tied (4) | Oracle Arena; 19,596 | 25−4 |
| 30 | December 22 | @ Brooklyn | W 117–101 | Kevin Durant (26) | Zaza Pachulia (14) | Durant, Curry (7) | Barclays Center; 17,732 | 26–4 |
| 31 | December 23 | @ Detroit | W 119–113 | Kevin Durant (32) | Draymond Green (9) | Draymond Green (12) | The Palace of Auburn Hills; 21,012 | 27−4 |
| 32 | December 25 | @ Cleveland | L 108–109 | Kevin Durant (36) | Kevin Durant (15) | David West (5) | Quicken Loans Arena; 20,562 | 27−5 |
| 33 | December 28 | Toronto | W 121–111 | Stephen Curry (28) | Kevin Durant (17) | Draymond Green (10) | Oracle Arena; 19,596 | 28−5 |
| 34 | December 30 | Dallas | W 108–99 | Klay Thompson (29) | Kevin Durant (11) | Kevin Durant (10) | Oracle Arena; 19,596 | 29−5 |

January : 12–2 (home: 7–1; road: 5–1)

| Game | Date | Team | Score | High points | High rebounds | High assists | Location Attendance | Record |
|---|---|---|---|---|---|---|---|---|
| 35 | January 2 | Denver | W 127–119 | Klay Thompson (25) | Draymond Green (10) | Draymond Green (13) | Oracle Arena; 19,596 | 30−5 |
| 36 | January 4 | Portland | W 125–117 | Stephen Curry (35) | Green, Curry (7) | Draymond Green (11) | Oracle Arena; 19,596 | 31−5 |
| 37 | January 6 | Memphis | L 119–128 (OT) | Stephen Curry (40) | Kevin Durant (13) | Stephen Curry (6) | Oracle Arena; 19,596 | 31−6 |
| 38 | January 8 | @ Sacramento | W 117–106 | Stephen Curry (30) | 4 players tied (7) | Draymond Green (10) | Golden 1 Center; 17,608 | 32−6 |
| 39 | January 10 | Miami | W 107–95 | Kevin Durant (28) | Draymond Green (9) | Stephen Curry (9) | Oracle Arena; 19,596 | 33−6 |
| 40 | January 12 | Detroit | W 127–107 | Kevin Durant (25) | Draymond Green (9) | Draymond Green (13) | Oracle Arena; 19,596 | 34−6 |
| 41 | January 16 | Cleveland | W 126–91 | Klay Thompson (26) | Green, Pachulia (13) | Green, Curry (11) | Oracle Arena; 19,596 | 35−6 |
| 42 | January 18 | Oklahoma City | W 121–100 | Kevin Durant (40) | Kevin Durant (12) | Stephen Curry (8) | Oracle Arena; 19,596 | 36−6 |
| 43 | January 20 | @ Houston | W 125–108 | Kevin Durant (32) | 3 players tied (9) | Draymond Green (8) | Toyota Center; 18,055 | 37−6 |
| 44 | January 22 | @ Orlando | W 118–98 | Stephen Curry (27) | Green, Durant (10) | Durant, Curry (6) | Amway Center; 18,846 | 38−6 |
| 45 | January 23 | @ Miami | L 102–105 | Kevin Durant (27) | Zaza Pachulia (10) | Stephen Curry (8) | American Airlines Arena; 19,600 | 38−7 |
| 46 | January 25 | @ Charlotte | W 113–103 | Kevin Durant (33) | Andre Iguodala (10) | Stephen Curry (7) | Spectrum Center; 19,639 | 39−7 |
| 47 | January 28 | L.A. Clippers | W 144–98 | Stephen Curry (43) | Stephen Curry (9) | Kevin Durant (7) | Oracle Arena; 19,596 | 40−7 |
| 48 | January 29 | @ Portland | W 113–111 | Kevin Durant (33) | Kevin Durant (10) | Kevin Durant (6) | Moda Center; 19,393 | 41−7 |

February : 9–3 (home: 5–0; road: 4–3)

| Game | Date | Team | Score | High points | High rebounds | High assists | Location Attendance | Record |
|---|---|---|---|---|---|---|---|---|
| 49 | February 1 | Charlotte | W 126–111 | Stephen Curry (39) | Draymond Green (10) | 3 players tied (8) | Oracle Arena; 19,596 | 42−7 |
| 50 | February 2 | @ L.A. Clippers | W 133–120 | Stephen Curry (29) | James Michael McAdoo (9) | Stephen Curry (11) | Staples Center; 19,385 | 43−7 |
| 51 | February 4 | @ Sacramento | L 106–109 (OT) | Stephen Curry (35) | Kevin Durant (9) | Stephen Curry (9) | Golden 1 Center; 17,608 | 43−8 |
| 52 | February 8 | Chicago | W 123–92 | Klay Thompson (28) | Kevin Durant (10) | Kevin Durant (7) | Oracle Arena; 19,596 | 44–8 |
| 53 | February 10 | @ Memphis | W 122–107 | Klay Thompson (36) | Draymond Green (11) | Draymond Green (10) | FedExForum; 18,119 | 45−8 |
| 54 | February 11 | @ Oklahoma City | W 130–114 | Kevin Durant (34) | Kevin Durant (9) | Stephen Curry (9) | Chesapeake Energy Arena; 18,203 | 46−8 |
| 55 | February 13 | @ Denver | L 110–132 | Kevin Durant (25) | JaVale McGee (7) | Draymond Green (6) | Pepsi Center; 19,941 | 46−9 |
| 56 | February 15 | Sacramento | W 109–86 | Klay Thompson (35) | JaVale McGee (10) | Stephen Curry (9) | Oracle Arena; 19,596 | 47−9 |
All-Star Break
| 57 | February 23 | L.A. Clippers | W 123–113 | Stephen Curry (35) | Kevin Durant (15) | Kevin Durant (7) | Oracle Arena; 19,596 | 48−9 |
| 58 | February 25 | Brooklyn | W 112–95 | Stephen Curry (27) | Pachulia, McGee (9) | Andre Iguodala (9) | Oracle Arena; 19,596 | 49−9 |
| 59 | February 27 | @ Philadelphia | W 119–108 | Kevin Durant (27) | Andre Iguodala (10) | Draymond Green (11) | Wells Fargo Center; 20,585 | 50–9 |
| 60 | February 28 | @ Washington | L 108–112 | Stephen Curry (25) | Pachulia, Green (8) | Draymond Green (14) | Verizon Center; 20,356 | 50−10 |

March : 12–4 (home: 6–1; road: 6–3)

| Game | Date | Team | Score | High points | High rebounds | High assists | Location Attendance | Record |
|---|---|---|---|---|---|---|---|---|
| 61 | March 2 | @ Chicago | L 87–94 | Stephen Curry (23) | Draymond Green (8) | Draymond Green (7) | United Center; 22,253 | 50−11 |
| 62 | March 5 | @ New York | W 112–105 | Stephen Curry (31) | Stephen Curry (8) | Stephen Curry (6) | Madison Square Garden; 19,812 | 51−11 |
| 63 | March 6 | @ Atlanta | W 119–111 | Curry, Iguodala (24) | Draymond Green (8) | Stephen Curry (9) | Philips Arena; 16,176 | 52–11 |
| 64 | March 8 | Boston | L 86–99 | Klay Thompson (25) | Draymond Green (8) | Stephen Curry (6) | Oracle Arena; 19,596 | 52−12 |
| 65 | March 10 | @ Minnesota | L 102–103 | Klay Thompson (30) | Draymond Green (7) | Green, Curry (7) | Target Center; 20,412 | 52–13 |
| 66 | March 11 | @ San Antonio | L 85–107 | Ian Clark (36) | Zaza Pachulia (12) | Matt Barnes (4) | AT&T Center; 18,418 | 52−14 |
| 67 | March 14 | Philadelphia | W 106–104 | Stephen Curry (29) | Green, Barnes (9) | Draymond Green (8) | Oracle Arena; 19,596 | 53−14 |
| 68 | March 16 | Orlando | W 122–92 | Klay Thompson (29) | Draymond Green (11) | Stephen Curry (9) | Oracle Arena; 19,596 | 54−14 |
| 69 | March 18 | Milwaukee | W 117–92 | Stephen Curry (28) | Matt Barnes (10) | Draymond Green (10) | Oracle Arena; 19,596 | 55−14 |
| 70 | March 20 | @ Oklahoma City | W 111–95 | Klay Thompson (34) | Draymond Green (10) | Green, Curry (6) | Chesapeake Energy Arena; 18,203 | 56−14 |
| 71 | March 21 | @ Dallas | W 112–87 | Klay Thompson (23) | Draymond Green (7) | Stephen Curry (9) | American Airlines Center; 20,453 | 57−14 |
| 72 | March 24 | Sacramento | W 114–100 | Stephen Curry (27) | JaVale McGee (10) | Stephen Curry (12) | Oracle Arena; 19,596 | 58−14 |
| 73 | March 26 | Memphis | W 106–94 | Klay Thompson (31) | Andre Iguodala (7) | Stephen Curry (11) | Oracle Arena; 19,596 | 59−14 |
| 74 | March 28 | @ Houston | W 113–106 | Stephen Curry (32) | Stephen Curry (10) | Curry, Iguodala (7) | Toyota Center; 18,055 | 60−14 |
| 75 | March 29 | @ San Antonio | W 110–98 | Stephen Curry (29) | Green, Iguodala (6) | Stephen Curry (11) | AT&T Center; 18,418 | 61−14 |
| 76 | March 31 | Houston | W 107–98 | Stephen Curry (24) | Klay Thompson (8) | Draymond Green (8) | Oracle Arena; 19,596 | 62−14 |

April: 5–1 (home: 4–1; road: 1–0)

| Game | Date | Team | Score | High points | High rebounds | High assists | Location Attendance | Record |
|---|---|---|---|---|---|---|---|---|
| 77 | April 2 | Washington | W 139–115 | Stephen Curry (42) | Draymond Green (11) | Draymond Green (13) | Oracle Arena; 19,596 | 63−14 |
| 78 | April 4 | Minnesota | W 121–107 | Klay Thompson (41) | Zaza Pachulia (7) | Stephen Curry (9) | Oracle Arena; 19,596 | 64−14 |
| 79 | April 5 | @ Phoenix | W 120–111 | Stephen Curry (42) | Matt Barnes (8) | Stephen Curry (11) | Talking Stick Resort Arena; 18,055 | 65−14 |
| 80 | April 8 | New Orleans | W 123–101 | Klay Thompson (20) | Kevin Durant (10) | Durant, Livingston (6) | Oracle Arena; 19,596 | 66−14 |
| 81 | April 10 | Utah | L 99–105 | Stephen Curry (28) | Kevin Durant (10) | Kevin Durant (6) | Oracle Arena; 19,596 | 66−15 |
| 82 | April 12 | L.A. Lakers | W 109–94 | Kevin Durant (29) | Kevin Durant (8) | Stephen Curry (8) | Oracle Arena; 19,596 | 67−15 |

2016–17 season schedule

== Playoffs ==
2017 playoff game log
Total: 16–1 (Home: 9–0; Road: 7–1)
First Round: 4–0 (home: 2–0; road: 2–0)

| Game | Date | Team | Score | High points | High rebounds | High assists | Location Attendance | Series |
|---|---|---|---|---|---|---|---|---|
| 1 | April 16 | Portland | W 121–109 | Kevin Durant (32) | Draymond Green (12) | Draymond Green (9) | Oracle Arena; 19,596 | 1–0 |
| 2 | April 19 | Portland | W 110–81 | Stephen Curry (19) | Draymond Green (12) | Draymond Green (10) | Oracle Arena; 19,596 | 2–0 |
| 3 | April 22 | @ Portland | W 119–113 | Stephen Curry (34) | Draymond Green (8) | Stephen Curry (8) | Moda Center; 20,177 | 3–0 |
| 4 | April 24 | @ Portland | W 128–103 | Stephen Curry (37) | Curry, Pachulia (7) | Stephen Curry (8) | Moda Center; 19,902 | 4–0 |

Conference Semifinals: 4–0 (home: 2–0; road: 2–0)

| Game | Date | Team | Score | High points | High rebounds | High assists | Location Attendance | Series |
|---|---|---|---|---|---|---|---|---|
| 1 | May 2 | Utah | W 106–94 | Stephen Curry (22) | Draymond Green (8) | David West (7) | Oracle Arena; 19,596 | 1–0 |
| 2 | May 4 | Utah | W 115–104 | Kevin Durant (25) | Kevin Durant (11) | Kevin Durant (7) | Oracle Arena; 19,596 | 2–0 |
| 3 | May 6 | @ Utah | W 102–91 | Kevin Durant (38) | Kevin Durant (13) | Draymond Green (5) | Vivint Smart Home Arena; 19,911 | 3–0 |
| 4 | May 8 | @ Utah | W 121–95 | Stephen Curry (30) | Draymond Green (10) | Draymond Green (11) | Vivint Smart Home Arena; 19,911 | 4–0 |

Conference Finals: 4–0 (home: 2–0; road: 2–0)

| Game | Date | Team | Score | High points | High rebounds | High assists | Location Attendance | Series |
|---|---|---|---|---|---|---|---|---|
| 1 | May 14 | San Antonio | W 113–111 | Stephen Curry (40) | Zaza Pachulia (9) | Draymond Green (7) | Oracle Arena; 19,596 | 1–0 |
| 2 | May 16 | San Antonio | W 136–100 | Stephen Curry (29) | Draymond Green (9) | Stephen Curry (7) | Oracle Arena; 19,596 | 2–0 |
| 3 | May 20 | @ San Antonio | W 120–108 | Kevin Durant (33) | Kevin Durant (10) | Draymond Green (7) | AT&T Center; 18,792 | 3–0 |
| 4 | May 22 | @ San Antonio | W 129–115 | Stephen Curry (36) | Kevin Durant (12) | Draymond Green (8) | AT&T Center; 18,466 | 4–0 |

NBA Finals: 4–1 (home: 3–0; road: 1–1)

| Game | Date | Team | Score | High points | High rebounds | High assists | Location Attendance | Series |
|---|---|---|---|---|---|---|---|---|
| 1 | June 1 | Cleveland | W 113–91 | Kevin Durant (38) | Draymond Green (11) | Stephen Curry (10) | Oracle Arena; 19,596 | 1–0 |
| 2 | June 4 | Cleveland | W 132–113 | Kevin Durant (33) | Kevin Durant (13) | Stephen Curry (11) | Oracle Arena; 19,596 | 2–0 |
| 3 | June 7 | @ Cleveland | W 118–113 | Kevin Durant (31) | Stephen Curry (13) | Draymond Green (7) | Quicken Loans Arena; 20,562 | 3–0 |
| 4 | June 9 | @ Cleveland | L 116–137 | Kevin Durant (35) | Draymond Green (14) | Stephen Curry (10) | Quicken Loans Arena; 20,562 | 3–1 |
| 5 | June 12 | Cleveland | W 129–120 | Kevin Durant (39) | Draymond Green (12) | Stephen Curry (10) | Oracle Arena; 19,596 | 4–1 |

2017 playoff schedule

== Player statistics ==
Legend
| GP | Games played | GS | Games started | MPG | Minutes per game |
| FG% | Field-goal percentage | 3P% | 3-point field-goal percentage | FT% | Free-throw percentage |
| RPG | Rebounds per game | APG | Assists per game | SPG | Steals per game |
| BPG | Blocks per game | PPG | Points per game |

=== Regular season ===
| Player | GP | GS | MPG | FG% | 3P% | FT% | RPG | APG | SPG | BPG | PPG |
|---|---|---|---|---|---|---|---|---|---|---|---|
| Stephen Curry | 79 | 79 | 33.4 | .468 | .411 | .898 | 4.5 | 6.6 | 1.8 | .2 | 25.3 |
| Kevin Durant | 62 | 62 | 33.4 | .537 | .375 | .875 | 8.3 | 4.9 | 1.1 | 1.6 | 25.1 |
| Klay Thompson | 78 | 78 | 34.0 | .468 | .414 | .853 | 3.7 | 2.1 | .8 | .5 | 22.3 |
| Draymond Green | 76 | 76 | 32.5 | .418 | .308 | .709 | 7.9 | 7.0 | 2.0 | 1.4 | 10.2 |
| Andre Iguodala | 76 | 0 | 26.3 | .528 | .362 | .706 | 4.0 | 3.4 | 1.0 | .5 | 7.6 |
| Ian Clark | 77 | 0 | 14.8 | .487 | .374 | .759 | 1.6 | 1.2 | .5 | .1 | 6.8 |
| Zaza Pachulia | 70 | 70 | 18.1 | .534 | .000 | .778 | 5.9 | 1.9 | .8 | .5 | 6.1 |
| JaVale McGee | 77 | 10 | 9.6 | .652 | .000 | .505 | 3.2 | .2 | .2 | .9 | 6.1 |
| Shaun Livingston | 76 | 3 | 17.7 | .547 | .333 | .700 | 2.0 | 1.8 | .5 | .3 | 5.1 |
| David West | 68 | 0 | 12.6 | .536 | .375 | .768 | 3.0 | 2.2 | .6 | .7 | 4.6 |
| Patrick McCaw | 71 | 20 | 15.1 | .433 | .333 | .784 | 1.4 | 1.1 | .5 | .2 | 4.0 |
| James Michael McAdoo | 52 | 2 | 8.8 | .530 | .250 | .500 | 1.7 | .3 | .3 | .6 | 2.8 |
| Kevon Looney | 53 | 4 | 8.4 | .523 | .222 | .618 | 2.3 | .5 | .3 | .3 | 2.5 |
| Damian Jones | 10 | 0 | 8.5 | .500 | – | .300 | 2.3 | .0 | .1 | .4 | 1.9 |
| Matt Barnes ^{≠} | 20 | 5 | 20.5 | .422 | .346 | .870 | 4.6 | 2.3 | .6 | .5 | 5.7 |
| Brianté Weber ^{≠} | 7 | 0 | 6.6 | .357 | .000 | .667 | .6 | .7 | .4 | .1 | 1.7 |
| Anderson Varejão ^{‡} | 14 | 1 | 6.6 | .357 | – | .727 | 1.9 | .7 | .2 | .2 | 1.3 |

After all games.
^{‡} Waived during the season
^{†} Traded during the season
^{≠} Acquired during the season

=== Playoffs ===
| Player | GP | GS | MPG | FG% | 3P% | FT% | RPG | APG | SPG | BPG | PPG |
|---|---|---|---|---|---|---|---|---|---|---|---|
| Kevin Durant | 15 | 15 | 35.5 | .556 | .442 | .893 | 8.0 | 4.3 | .8 | 1.3 | 28.5 |
| Stephen Curry | 17 | 17 | 35.3 | .484 | .419 | .904 | 6.2 | 6.7 | 2.0 | .2 | 28.1 |
| Klay Thompson | 17 | 17 | 35.0 | .397 | .387 | .788 | 3.9 | 2.1 | .8 | .3 | 15.0 |
| Draymond Green | 17 | 17 | 34.9 | .447 | .410 | .687 | 9.1 | 6.5 | 1.8 | 1.6 | 13.1 |
| Andre Iguodala | 16 | 0 | 26.2 | .455 | .190 | .577 | 4.0 | 3.2 | .9 | .4 | 7.2 |
| Ian Clark | 16 | 0 | 13.7 | .506 | .361 | .941 | 1.6 | .7 | .4 | .0 | 6.8 |
| JaVale McGee | 16 | 1 | 9.3 | .732 | – | .722 | 3.0 | .3 | .1 | .9 | 5.9 |
| Shaun Livingston | 14 | 0 | 15.7 | .576 | – | .714 | 2.1 | 1.4 | .4 | .1 | 5.2 |
| Zaza Pachulia | 15 | 15 | 14.1 | .533 | .000 | .765 | 3.8 | .8 | .5 | .3 | 5.1 |
| David West | 17 | 0 | 13.0 | .576 | .500 | .778 | 2.7 | 2.1 | .4 | .8 | 4.5 |
| Patrick McCaw | 15 | 3 | 12.1 | .438 | .348 | .846 | 2.2 | 1.1 | .6 | .2 | 4.1 |
| James Michael McAdoo | 13 | 0 | 4.3 | .529 | .400 | .667 | 1.0 | .0 | .2 | .2 | 1.8 |
| Damian Jones | 4 | 0 | 5.3 | .429 | – | .500 | 1.5 | .0 | .5 | .3 | 1.8 |
| Matt Barnes | 12 | 0 | 5.1 | .267 | .125 | – | .8 | .6 | .2 | .0 | 0.8 |

== Transactions ==
=== Trades ===
| June 23, 2016 | To Golden State Warriors • Draft rights to (United States) Patrick McCaw | To Milwaukee Bucks • Cash considerations |
| July 7, 2016 | To Golden State Warriors • Future 2nd round-pick | To Dallas Mavericks • (Australia) Andrew Bogut • Future conditional 2nd round-pick |

=== Free agency ===
==== Re-signed ====
| Player | Signed |
|---|---|
| (United States) Ian Clark | 1-year contract worth $980,431 |
| (United States) James Michael McAdoo | 1-year contract worth $980,431 |
| (Brazil) Anderson Varejão | 1-year contract worth $980,431 |

==== Additions ====
| Player | Signed | Former team |
|---|---|---|
| (United States) Kevin Durant | 2-year contract worth $54.3 million | Oklahoma City Thunder |
| (United States) David West | 1-year contract worth $1.55 million | San Antonio Spurs |
| (Georgia (country)) Zaza Pachulia | 1-year contract worth $2.9 million | Dallas Mavericks |
| (United States) JaVale McGee | 1-year contract worth $980,431 | Dallas Mavericks |
| (United States) Brianté Weber | 10-day contract worth $51,449; 12-day contract worth $61,739 | Sioux Falls Skyforce (NBA D-League) |
| (United States) Matt Barnes | | Sacramento Kings |

==== Subtractions ====
| Player | Reason left | New team |
|---|---|---|
| (United States) Harrison Barnes | 4-year contract worth $94 million | Dallas Mavericks |
| (Nigeria) Festus Ezeli | 2-year contract worth $15.2 million | Portland Trail Blazers |
| (United States) Brandon Rush | 1-year contract worth $3.5 million | Minnesota Timberwolves |
| (United States) Marreese Speights | 1-year contract worth $980,431 | Los Angeles Clippers |
| (Brazil) Leandro Barbosa | 2-year contract worth $8 million | Phoenix Suns |
| (Brazil) Anderson Varejão | Waived | —N/a |

== Awards ==
| Recipient | Award | Date awarded | Ref. |
|---|---|---|---|
| (United States) Kevin Durant | Western Conference Player of the Week | November 28, 2016 | |
| (United States) Steve Kerr | Western Conference Coach of the Month (October/November) | December 2, 2016 | |
| (United States) Stephen Curry | Western Conference Player of the Week | January 9, 2017 | |
| (United States) Steve Kerr | Western Conference Coach of the Month (January) | February 1, 2017 | |
| (United States) Stephen Curry / (United States) Kevin Durant | Western Conference Player(s) of the Month (January) | February 2, 2017 | |
| (United States) Steve Kerr | Western Conference Head Coach | January 23, 2017 | |
| (United States) Stephen Curry | Western Conference Player of the Week | April 3, 2017 | |
| (United States) Kevin Durant | Finals Most Valuable Player | June 12, 2017 | |
| (United States) Draymond Green | Defensive Player of the Year Award | June 26, 2017 | |
| (United States) Bob Myers | Executive of the Year Award | June 26, 2017 | |
