= Patrick McCaw =

American basketball player (born 1995)

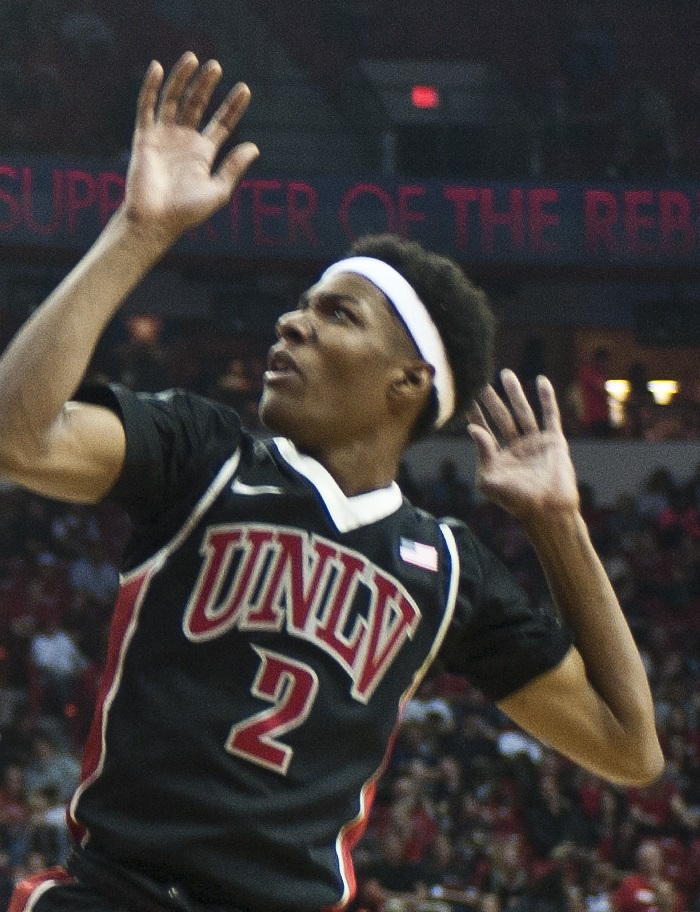
- McCaw with UNLV in 2015

Free agent
- Position: Shooting guard / small forward

Personal information
- Born: October 25, 1995 (age 31) St. Louis, Missouri, U.S.
- Listed height: 6 ft 7 in (2.01 m)
- Listed weight: 181 lb (82 kg)

Career information
- High school: Christian Brothers College (St. Louis, Missouri); Montrose Christian (Rockville, Maryland)
- College: UNLV (2014–2016)
- NBA draft: 2016: 2nd round, 38th overall pick
- Drafted by: Milwaukee Bucks
- Playing career: 2016–present

Career history
- 2016–2018: Golden State Warriors
- 2016–2017: →Santa Cruz Warriors
- 2018–2019: Cleveland Cavaliers
- 2019–2021: Toronto Raptors
- 2022–2025: Delaware Blue Coats
- 2025–2026: Raptors 905

Career highlights
- 3× NBA champion (2017–2019); NBA G League champion (2023); Second-team All-MWC (2016); MWC All-Defensive Team (2016)
- Stats at NBA.com
- Stats at Basketball Reference
Medals
Men's basketball
Representing United States
FIBA AmeriCup
Bronze medal – third place	2022 Brazil

Patrick Andrew McCaw (born October 25, 1995) is an American professional basketball player who last played for the Raptors 905 of the NBA G League. He played college basketball for the UNLV Runnin' Rebels and earned second-team all-conference honors in the Mountain West Conference (MWC) as a sophomore in 2016. McCaw was selected by the Milwaukee Bucks in the second round of the 2016 NBA draft. He won three NBA championships in his first three seasons: two with the Golden State Warriors and one with the Toronto Raptors, the first NBA player to do so while switching teams.

== Early life ==
McCaw was born in St. Louis, Missouri, to Jeffery and Teresa McCaw. He initially attended Christian Brothers College High School but transferred to Montrose Christian School as a senior, where McCaw averaged 13 points per game and led the team to a 20–5 record and the National Christian School Athletic Association Division I title. After he graduated, McCaw was ranked as the 38th-best shooting guard in the country.

== College career ==
McCaw attended UNLV where, in two seasons, he averaged 12.2 points, 4.2 rebounds, 3.3 assists, 2.0 steals and 31.7 minutes in 65 games. In his sophomore season, McCaw played 33 games and averaged 14.7 points, 5.2 rebounds, 3.9 assists and 2.45 steals in 33.7 minutes, having the second-most steals in the nation. He earned second-team all-conference honors in the MWC and also was named to their all-defensive team.

On April 4, 2016, McCaw declared for the NBA draft.

== Professional career ==
=== Golden State Warriors (2016–2018) ===
==== Rookie year and first ring (2016–2017) ====
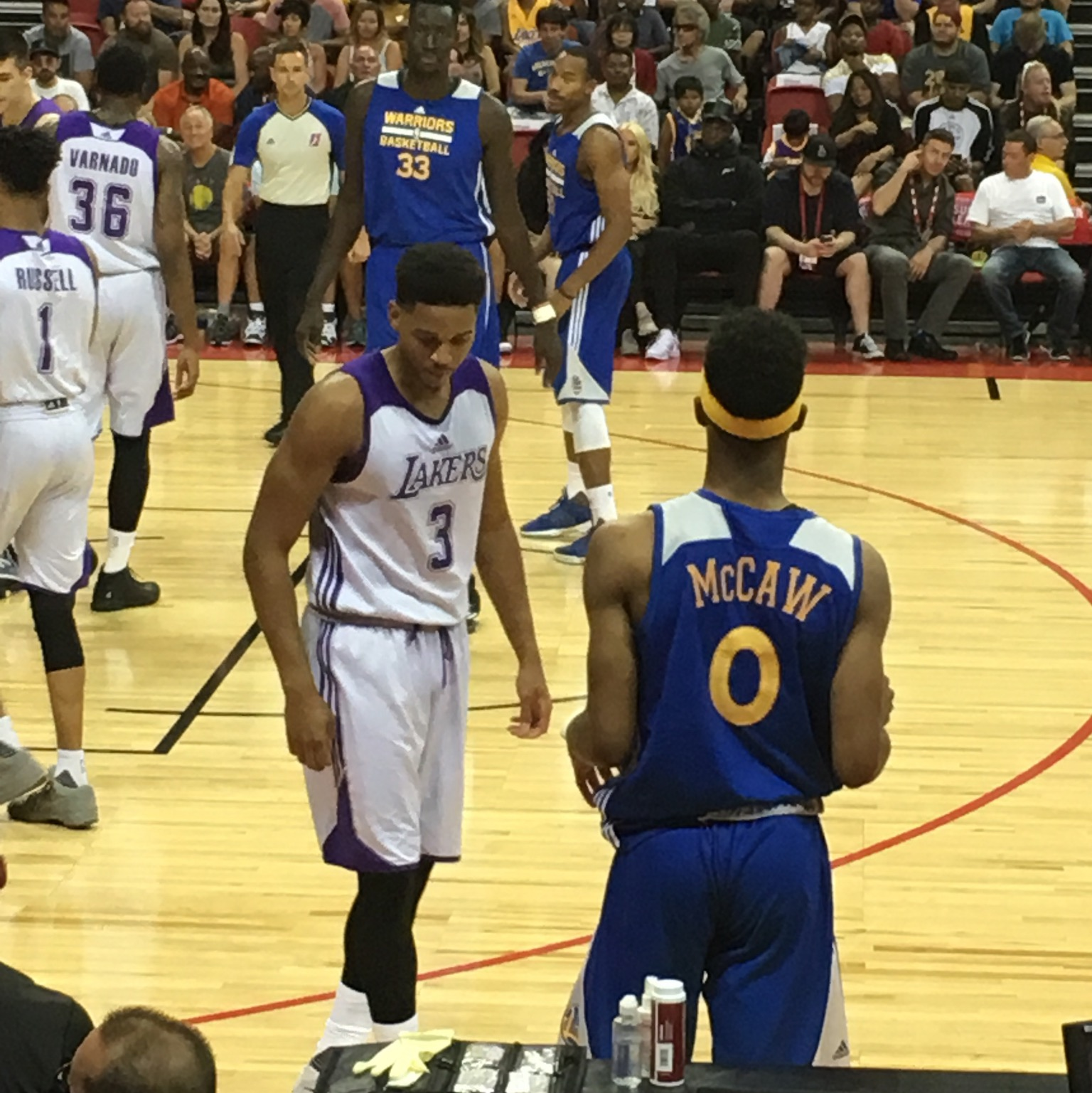
McCaw during the 2016 NBA Summer League

On June 23, 2016, McCaw was selected by the Milwaukee Bucks with the 38th overall pick in the 2016 NBA draft. He was later traded to the Golden State Warriors on draft night for cash considerations. Warriors executive board member, Jerry West, felt McCaw should not have slipped that far, saying: "People are gonna be sorry they didn't draft him." On July 6, 2016, McCaw signed with the Warriors and joined them for the 2016 NBA Summer League.

McCaw made his debut for the Warriors in their season-opener on October 25, 2016, against the San Antonio Spurs. In nine minutes off the bench, McCaw recorded two points, two assists, a steal and a block in the 129–100 loss. On December 8, he scored a then-career-high 10 points, all in the first half of the Warriors' 106–99 victory over the Utah Jazz. On December 29, McCaw was assigned to the Santa Cruz Warriors, Golden State's D-League affiliate. The next day, he was recalled by Golden State. On January 10, 2017, McCaw made his first career start in place of an ill Klay Thompson, contributing a three-pointer in a 107–95 victory over the Miami Heat. McCaw was reassigned to Santa Cruz on January 13, and was recalled the next day. On February 13, McCaw made another start in place of Thompson and went on to score a career-high 19 points in a 132–110 loss to the Denver Nuggets. After starting forward Kevin Durant suffered a left knee injury on February 28, McCaw started in place of Durant in most games.

McCaw made his first career playoff start in game 2 of the first round on April 19 in place of injured Durant, which the Warriors won 110–81 over the Portland Trail Blazers. McCaw finished with nine points, five rebounds, a block, a steal and an overall plus-27. He started in place of Durant again in game 3, contributing eight points, five rebounds, five assists, a block and three steals in a 119–113 comeback victory in Portland. In game 2 of the Western Conference Finals against the San Antonio Spurs on May 16, McCaw had 18 points, five assists, three rebounds and three steals off the bench to help the Warriors win 136–100. He was 6-for-8 from the field, including 3-for-4 on three-pointers. McCaw became the first rookie in the NBA with at least 18 points off the bench in a playoff game since James Harden in 2010, and the first Warriors rookie to do so since Robert Parish in 1977. Six days later, McCaw started in game 4, finishing with six points, four rebounds, two assists, a block and a plus-12 in the close-out 129–115 victory. The Warriors went on to win the 2017 NBA Finals after defeating the Cleveland Cavaliers in five games. The Warriors finished the playoffs with a 16–1 record, the best postseason winning percentage in NBA history.

==== Second championship (2017–2018) ====
On November 27, 2017, McCaw, starting in place of an injured Stephen Curry, scored a season-best 16 points with career highs of seven assists and four steals in a 110–106 loss to the Sacramento Kings. On March 31, 2018, McCaw left late in the third quarter of the Warriors' 112–96 victory over the Kings after a scary landing following an undercut by Vince Carter. McCaw drove the baseline and went down with a thud with 41.8 seconds left in the quarter and was hit in the lower body by Carter. McCaw laid still on the floor for roughly 10 minutes before being stretchered off and taken to UC Davis Medical Center for further evaluation. The following day, he was released from the hospital with a bruised lumbar spine. McCaw returned from injury in game 6 of the Western Conference Finals against the Houston Rockets on May 26. The Warriors went on to defeat the Rockets in game 7 two days later to advance to the NBA Finals for the fourth straight season, where they won their second straight championship with a four-game sweep of the Cavaliers.

Following the 2017–18 season, McCaw became a restricted free agent. In October 2018, he allowed the Warriors' $1.71 million qualifying offer to expire without accepting it, and reportedly declined another two-year, $5.2 million offer from the team. McCaw remained restricted, with the Warriors retaining the right to match any offer from another team.

=== Cleveland Cavaliers (2018–2019) ===
After remaining on the free agent market for nearly six months, McCaw signed with the Cleveland Cavaliers on December 30, 2018. The Warriors had declined to match the offer, which was reportedly a non-guaranteed, two-year, $6 million deal. On January 6, 2019, McCaw was waived by the Cavaliers after appearing in three games.

=== Toronto Raptors (2019–2021) ===
On January 10, 2019, McCaw signed with the Toronto Raptors. The Raptors advanced to the 2019 NBA Finals against McCaw's former team, the Golden State Warriors, where they won the series in six games to give McCaw his third straight championship. McCaw became the third player ever to win titles in three consecutive seasons with different teams, joining Steve Kerr and Frank Saul, and McCaw became the first player to win three consecutive NBA titles since Shaquille O'Neal, Kobe Bryant, Robert Horry, Derek Fisher, Rick Fox, Brian Shaw and Devean George led the Los Angeles Lakers to three straight wins from 2000 to 2002. McCaw also became the seventh player to win a championship during each of his first three years in the league.

On July 8, 2019, the Raptors announced that they had re-signed with McCaw. On November 6, it was announced that McCaw had undergone arthroscopic surgery on his left knee and was expected to be sidelined for about four weeks.

On April 9, 2021, the Raptors waived McCaw.

=== Delaware Blue Coats (2022–2025) ===
On February 11, 2022, McCaw was acquired by the Delaware Blue Coats of the NBA G League where he won the title.

On August 3, 2023, McCaw signed with Belgian basketball side Filou Oostende of the BNXT League, but the deal was cancelled due to visa problems on September 1. On October 29, he re-joined the Blue Coats.

=== Raptors 905 (2025–2026) ===
On September 16, 2025, McCaw was traded along with a future first round pick to Raptors 905, the G-League affiliate of the Toronto Raptors, with whom McCaw won the NBA title in 2019, in exchange for the rights to Kennedy Chandler.

== Career statistics ==
Legend
GP	Games played	GS	Games started	MPG	Minutes per game
FG%	Field goal percentage	3P%	3-point field goal percentage	FT%	Free throw percentage
RPG	Rebounds per game	APG	Assists per game	SPG	Steals per game
BPG	Blocks per game	PPG	Points per game	**Bold**	Career high
†	Won an NBA championship

=== NBA ===
==== Regular season ====
Year	Team	GP	GS	MPG	FG%	3P%	FT%	RPG	APG	SPG	BPG	PPG
2016–17†	Golden State	**71**	**20**	15.1	.433	**.333**	.784	1.4	1.1	.5	**.2**	4.0
2017–18†	Golden State	57	10	16.9	.409	.238	.765	1.4	1.4	.8	**.2**	4.0
2018–19†	Cleveland	3	0	17.7	.222	.250	–	1.0	.7	.7	.0	1.7
2018–19†	Toronto	26	1	13.2	.444	**.333**	.867	1.7	1.0	.8	.1	2.7
2019–20	Toronto	37	12	**27.5**	.414	.324	.722	**2.3**	**2.1**	**1.1**	.1	**4.6**
2020–21	Toronto	5	0	6.6	**1.000**	–	**1.000**	.6	.8	.4	.0	1.0
Career		199	43	16.9	.420	.305	.785	1.6	1.4	.7	.2	3.8

==== Playoffs ====
Year	Team	GP	GS	MPG	FG%	3P%	FT%	RPG	APG	SPG	BPG	PPG
2017†	Golden State	**15**	**3**	**12.1**	.438	**.348**	.846	**2.2**	**1.1**	**.6**	**.2**	**4.1**
2018†	Golden State	6	0	2.7	**.500**	.000	**1.000**	.5	.0	.3	.0	.7
2019†	Toronto	11	0	4.4	.200	.333	**1.000**	.3	.4	.2	.0	.5
Career		32	3	7.7	.418	.333	.882	1.2	.6	.4	.1	2.2

=== College ===
Year	Team	GP	GS	MPG	FG%	3P%	FT%	RPG	APG	SPG	BPG	PPG
2014–15	UNLV	32	16	29.6	.402	**.368**	.714	3.3	2.7	1.5	.3	9.6
2015–16	UNLV	**33**	**32**	**33.7**	**.465**	.366	**.774**	**5.1**	**3.9**	**2.5**	**.4**	**14.7**
Career		65	48	31.7	.439	.367	.753	4.2	3.3	2.0	.4	12.2

== Personal life ==
McCaw has five siblings. His older brother, Jeffrey, died in May 2019 during the Eastern Conference Finals, resulting in McCaw missing the first five games of the series against the Milwaukee Bucks for personal reasons.
