= 2016–17 Portland Trail Blazers season =

NBA professional basketball team season

- Head coach: Terry Stotts
- General manager: Neil Olshey
- Arena: Moda Center

Results
- Record: 41–41 (.500)
- Place: Division: 3rd (Northwest); Conference: 8th (Western)
- Playoff finish: First round (lost to Warriors 0–4)
- Stats at Basketball Reference

Local media
- Television: Comcast SportsNet Northwest, KGW
- Radio: KPOJ, Portland Trail Blazers Radio

The 2016–17 Portland Trail Blazers season was the franchise's 47th season in the National Basketball Association (NBA).

The Blazers would finish the regular season with a 41–41 record, securing the 8th seed. In the playoffs, they faced against the 1st seeded and eventual NBA champion Golden State Warriors in the First Round, in which they were swept in four games.

== Draft picks ==
The Trail Blazers received the 47th pick of the 2016 NBA draft from the Orlando Magic in exchange for $1.2 million and a 2019 second-round pick. The Trail Blazers used this pick to draft Jake Layman out of Maryland.

== Roster ==
2016–17 Portland Trail Blazers roster
Players

Pos.	No.	Player	Height	Weight	DOB	From
SF	8	Al-Farouq Aminu	6 ft 9 in (2.06 m)	220 lb (100 kg)	1990-09-21	Wake Forest
SG	5	Pat Connaughton	6 ft 5 in (1.96 m)	210 lb (95 kg)	1993-01-06	Notre Dame
SG	23	Allen Crabbe	6 ft 6 in (1.98 m)	215 lb (98 kg)	1992-04-09	California
PF	17	Ed Davis	6 ft 10 in (2.08 m)	245 lb (111 kg)	1989-06-05	North Carolina
C	31	Festus Ezeli	6 ft 11 in (2.11 m)	265 lb (120 kg)	1989-10-21	Vanderbilt
SF	4	Maurice Harkless	6 ft 9 in (2.06 m)	220 lb (100 kg)	1993-05-11	St. John's
SF	10	Jake Layman	6 ft 9 in (2.06 m)	210 lb (95 kg)	1994-07-24	Maryland
C	11	Meyers Leonard	7 ft 1 in (2.16 m)	255 lb (116 kg)	1992-02-27	Illinois
PG	0	Damian Lillard	6 ft 3 in (1.91 m)	195 lb (88 kg)	1990-07-15	Weber State
SG	3	CJ McCollum	6 ft 4 in (1.93 m)	190 lb (86 kg)	1991-09-19	Lehigh
PG	6	Shabazz Napier	6 ft 1 in (1.85 m)	175 lb (79 kg)	1991-07-14	Connecticut
C	27	Jusuf Nurkić	7 ft 0 in (2.13 m)	280 lb (127 kg)	1994-08-23	Bosnia and Herzegovina
SG	55	Tim Quarterman	6 ft 6 in (1.98 m)	190 lb (86 kg)	1994-10-27	LSU
SG	1	Evan Turner	6 ft 7 in (2.01 m)	220 lb (100 kg)	1988-10-27	Ohio State
PF	21	Noah Vonleh	6 ft 10 in (2.08 m)	245 lb (111 kg)	1995-08-24	Indiana

Coaches
Head coach
- Terry Stotts
Assistant(s)
- John McCullough
- Jim Moran
- Dale Osbourne
- Nate Tibbetts
- David Vanterpool
- Chris Stackpole (player development)

Legend
- (DP) Unsigned draft pick
- (FA) Free agent
- (S) Suspended
- (DL) On assignment to D-League affiliate
- Injured

Roster
Updated: 2017-04-02

== Standings ==
=== Division ===
Northwest Division	W	L	PCT	GB	Home	Road	Div	GP
y – Utah Jazz	51	31	.622	–	29‍–‍12	22‍–‍19	8–8	82
x – Oklahoma City Thunder	47	35	.573	4.0	28‍–‍13	19‍–‍22	10–6	82
x – Portland Trail Blazers	41	41	.500	10.0	25‍–‍16	16‍–‍25	11–5	82
e – Denver Nuggets	40	42	.488	11.0	22‍–‍19	18‍–‍23	6–10	82
e – Minnesota Timberwolves	31	51	.378	20.0	20‍–‍21	11‍–‍30	5–11	82

=== Conference ===
Western Conference
#	Team	W	L	PCT	GB	GP
1	z – Golden State Warriors *	67	15	.817	–	82
2	y – San Antonio Spurs *	61	21	.744	6.0	82
3	x – Houston Rockets	55	27	.671	12.0	82
4	x – Los Angeles Clippers	51	31	.622	16.0	82
5	y – Utah Jazz *	51	31	.622	16.0	82
6	x – Oklahoma City Thunder	47	35	.573	20.0	82
7	x – Memphis Grizzlies	43	39	.524	24.0	82
8	x – Portland Trail Blazers	41	41	.500	26.0	82
9	e – Denver Nuggets	40	42	.488	27.0	82
10	e – New Orleans Pelicans	34	48	.415	33.0	82
11	e – Dallas Mavericks	33	49	.402	34.0	82
12	e – Sacramento Kings	32	50	.390	35.0	82
13	e – Minnesota Timberwolves	31	51	.378	36.0	82
14	e – Los Angeles Lakers	26	56	.317	41.0	82
15	e – Phoenix Suns	24	58	.293	43.0	82

== Game log ==
=== Preseason ===
2016 pre-season game log
Total: 4–3 (home: 2–1; road: 2–2)
Pre-season: 4–3 (home: 2–1; road: 2–2)

Game	Date	Team	Score	High points	High rebounds	High assists	Location Attendance	Record
1	October 3	Jazz	W 98–89	Damian Lillard (16)	Ed Davis (7)	Lillard, McCollum (5)	Moda Center; 15,004	1–0
2	October 7	Suns	W 115–110	Shabazz Napier (20)	Noah Vonleh (14)	Mason Plumlee (6)	Moda Center; 19,441	2–0
3	October 11	@ Lakers	W 109–106 (OT)	Damian Lillard (30)	Mason Plumlee (11)	CJ McCollum (6)	Staples Center; 15,290	3–0
4	October 13	@ Clippers	L 108–109	CJ McCollum (20)	Ed Davis (11)	Damian Lillard (9)	Staples Center; 14,896	3–1
5	October 16	Nuggets	L 97–106	CJ McCollum (20)	Noah Vonleh (10)	McCollum, Plumlee (4)	Moda Center; 18,135	3–2
6	October 19	@ Jazz	W 88–84	Damian Lillard (27)	Mason Plumlee (10)	Mason Plumlee (7)	Vivint Smart Home Arena; 17,519	4–2
7	October 21	@ Warriors	L 96–107	Damian Lillard (20)	Noah Vonleh (9)	McCollum, Lillard (4)	Oracle Arena; 19,596	4–3

2016–17 pre-season schedule

=== Regular season ===
2016–17 game log
Total: 41–41 (home: 25–16; road: 16–25)
October: 2–1 (home: 1–1; road: 1–0)

Game	Date	Team	Score	High points	High rebounds	High assists	Location Attendance	Record
1	October 25	Utah	W 113–104	Damian Lillard (39)	Damian Lillard (8)	Damian Lillard (6)	Moda Center; 19,446	1–0
2	October 27	L.A. Clippers	L 106–114	Damian Lillard (29)	Damian Lillard (10)	Plumlee, Crabbe (4)	Moda Center; 19,500	1–1
3	October 29	@ Denver	W 115–113 (OT)	Damian Lillard (37)	Al-Farouq Aminu (12)	Damian Lillard (7)	Pepsi Center; 18,055	2–1

November : 8–9 (home: 5–3; road: 3–6)

Game	Date	Team	Score	High points	High rebounds	High assists	Location Attendance	Record
4	November 1	Golden State	L 104–127	Damian Lillard (31)	Al-Farouq Aminu (10)	Mason Plumlee (6)	Moda Center; 19,393	2–2
5	November 2	@ Phoenix	L 115–118 (OT)	Damian Lillard (27)	Mason Plumlee (12)	Damian Lillard (5)	Talking Stick Resort Arena; 17,284	2–3
6	November 4	@ Dallas	W 105–95	Damian Lillard (42)	Al-Farouq Aminu (10)	Lillard, Plumlee (4)	American Airlines Center; 19,475	3–3
7	November 6	@ Memphis	W 100–94	CJ McCollum (37)	Harkless, Plumlee (7)	Damian Lillard (7)	FedExForum; 16,233	4–3
8	November 8	Phoenix	W 124–121	Damian Lillard (38)	Noah Vonleh (8)	CJ McCollum (7)	Moda Center; 19,239	5–3
9	November 9	@ L.A. Clippers	L 80–111	Shabazz Napier (11)	Noah Vonleh (11)	Mason Plumlee (4)	Staples Center; 19,060	5–4
10	November 11	Sacramento	W 122–120 (OT)	Damian Lillard (36)	Maurice Harkless (8)	Lillard, Plumlee (7)	Moda Center; 19,918	6–4
11	November 13	Denver	W 112–105	Damian Lillard (32)	Mason Plumlee (9)	Damian Lillard (6)	Moda Center; 19,362	7–4
12	November 15	Chicago	L 88–113	Damian Lillard (19)	Ed Davis (9)	Lillard, Plumlee, McCollum (4)	Moda Center; 13,393	7–5
13	November 17	@ Houston	L 109–126	CJ McCollum (26)	Mason Plumlee (8)	Mason Plumlee (7)	Toyota Center; 15,550	7–6
14	November 18	@ New Orleans	L 101–113	Damian Lillard (27)	Mason Plumlee (12)	CJ McCollum (5)	Smoothie King Center; 15,552	7–7
15	November 20	@ Brooklyn	W 129–109	CJ McCollum (33)	Mason Plumlee (8)	McCollum, Lillard (5)	Barclays Center; 16,608	8–7
16	November 22	@ New York	L 103–107	Damian Lillard (22)	Ed Davis (10)	Damian Lillard (6)	Madison Square Garden; 19,120	8–8
17	November 23	@ Cleveland	L 125–137	Damian Lillard (40)	Lillard, Harkless (7)	Damian Lillard (11)	Quicken Loans Arena; 20,562	8–9
18	November 25	New Orleans	W 119–104	Damian Lillard (27)	Mason Plumlee (14)	Damian Lillard (11)	Moda Center; 19,393	9–9
19	November 27	Houston	L 114–130	CJ McCollum (28)	Mason Plumlee (8)	McCollum, Plumlee (7)	Moda Center; 19,393	9–10
20	November 30	Indiana	W 131–109	Damian Lillard (28)	Plumlee, Davis (9)	Damian Lillard (10)	Moda Center; 19,107	10–10

December : 4–11 (home: 3–3; road: 1–8)

Game	Date	Team	Score	High points	High rebounds	High assists	Location Attendance	Record
21	December 3	Miami	W 99–92	Damian Lillard (19)	Mason Plumlee (9)	Damian Lillard, Turner (6)	Moda Center; 19,393	11–10
22	December 5	@ Chicago	W 112–110	Damian Lillard (30)	Maurice Harkless (8)	Damian Lillard (7)	United Center; 21,351	12–10
23	December 7	@ Milwaukee	L 107–115	Damian Lillard (30)	Mason Plumlee (10)	Damian Lillard (6)	BMO Harris Bradley Center; 14,033	12–11
24	December 8	@ Memphis	L 86–88	Damian Lillard (24)	Al-Farouq Aminu (11)	Mason Plumlee (4)	FedExForum; 14,317	12–12
25	December 10	@ Indiana	L 111–118	CJ McCollum (34)	Ed Davis (10)	Damian Lillard (9)	Bankers Life Fieldhouse; 16,211	12–13
26	December 12	@ L.A. Clippers	L 120–121	CJ McCollum (25)	Mason Plumlee (7)	Damian Lillard (8)	Staples Center; 19,060	12–14
27	December 13	Oklahoma City	W 114–95	Mason Plumlee (18)	Mason Plumlee (7)	Damian Lillard (9)	Moda Center; 19,505	13–14
28	December 15	@ Denver	L 120–132	Damian Lillard (40)	Plumlee, Vonleh (7)	Damian Lillard (10)	Pepsi Center; 10,022	13–15
29	December 17	@ Golden State	L 90–135	Damian Lillard (20)	Noah Vonleh (8)	Mason Plumlee (5)	Oracle Arena; 19,596	13–16
30	December 20	@ Sacramento	L 121–126	CJ McCollum (36)	Mason Plumlee (13)	Damian Lillard (15)	Golden 1 Center; 17,608	13–17
31	December 21	Dallas	L 95–96	Damian Lillard (29)	Ed Davis (10)	Plumlee, Lillard (4)	Moda Center; 19,393	13–18
32	December 23	San Antonio	L 90–110	McCollum, Lillard, Leonard (16)	CJ McCollum (6)	Damian Lillard (10)	Moda Center; 19,393	13–19
33	December 26	Toronto	L 91–95	CJ McCollum (29)	Mason Plumlee (15)	CJ McCollum (7)	Moda Center; 19,393	13–20
34	December 28	Sacramento	W 102–89	CJ McCollum (20)	Mason Plumlee (14)	CJ McCollum (7)	Moda Center; 19,665	14–20
35	December 30	@ San Antonio	L 94–110	CJ McCollum (29)	Al-Farouq Aminu (6)	Mason Plumlee (6)	AT&T Center; 18,418	14–21

January : 8–7 (home: 5–3; road: 3–4)

Game	Date	Team	Score	High points	High rebounds	High assists	Location Attendance	Record
36	January 1	@ Minnesota	W 95–89	CJ McCollum (43)	Plumlee, Crabbe (8)	Plumlee, McCollum, Aminu (3)	Target Center; 15,804	15–21
37	January 4	@ Golden State	L 117–125	CJ McCollum (35)	Mason Plumlee (10)	McCollum, Crabbe (5)	Oracle Arena; 19,596	15–22
38	January 5	L. A. Lakers	W 118–109	CJ McCollum (27)	Al-Farouq Aminu (11)	Damian Lillard (10)	Moda Center; 19,403	16–22
39	January 8	Detroit	L 124–125 (2OT)	CJ McCollum (35)	Mason Plumlee (10)	Mason Plumlee (12)	Moda Center; 13,506	16–23
40	January 10	@ L.A. Lakers	W 108–87	CJ McCollum (25)	Mason Plumlee (12)	Damian Lillard (6)	Staples Center; 18,997	17–23
41	January 11	Cleveland	W 102–86	CJ McCollum (27)	Al-Farouq Aminu (12)	Evan Turner (11)	Moda Center; 19,393	18–23
42	January 13	Orlando	L 109–115	Damian Lillard (34)	Plumlee, Aminu (7)	Mason Plumlee (5)	Moda Center; 19,344	18–24
43	January 16	@ Washington	L 101–120	Damian Lillard (22)	Noah Vonleh (8)	Allen Crabbe (5)	Verizon Center; 17,395	18–25
44	January 18	@ Charlotte	L 85–107	Damian Lillard (21)	Mason Plumlee (10)	Damian Lillard (6)	Spectrum Center; 15,451	18–26
45	January 20	@ Philadelphia	L 92–93	Damian Lillard (30)	Mason Plumlee (11)	CJ McCollum (4)	Wells Fargo Center; 19,476	18–27
46	January 21	@ Boston	W 127–123 (OT)	Damian Lillard (35)	Mason Plumlee (11)	CJ McCollum (7)	TD Garden; 18,624	19–27
47	January 25	L.A. Lakers	W 105–98	McCollum, Lillard (24)	Mason Plumlee (13)	CJ McCollum (4)	Staples Center; 19,393	20–27
48	January 27	Memphis	W 112–109	Damian Lillard (33)	Mason Plumlee (10)	Damian Lillard (6)	Moda Center; 19,558	21–27
49	January 29	Golden State	L 111–113	CJ McCollum (28)	Mason Plumlee (11)	Damian Lillard (8)	Moda Center; 19,393	21–28
50	January 31	Charlotte	W 115–98	Damian Lillard (27)	Mason Plumlee (11)	McCollum, Lillard, Leonard (4)	Moda Center; 19,393	22–28

February : 2–7 (home: 0–3; road: 2–4)

Game	Date	Team	Score	High points	High rebounds	High assists	Location Attendance	Record
51	February 3	Dallas	L 104–108	CJ McCollum (28)	Plumlee, Lillard (9)	McCollum, Lillard (6)	Moda Center; 19,393	22–29
52	February 5	@ Oklahoma City	L 99–105	Damian Lillard (29)	CJ McCollum (8)	Plumlee, Lillard (3)	Chesapeake Energy Arena; 18,203	22–30
53	February 7	@ Dallas	W 113–112	CJ McCollum (32)	Mason Plumlee (13)	Damian Lillard (6)	American Airlines Center; 19,526	23–30
54	February 9	Boston	L 111–120	Damian Lillard (28)	Noah Vonleh (9)	Damian Lillard (7)	Moda Center; 19,393	23–31
55	February 13	Atlanta	L 104–109 (OT)	CJ McCollum (26)	Al-Farouq Aminu (15)	CJ McCollum (5)	Moda Center; 19,475	23–32
56	February 15	@ Utah	L 88–111	CJ McCollum (18)	Nurkic, Connaughton, Vonleh (7)	Damian Lillard (7)	Vivint Smart Home Arena; 19,590	23–33
All-Star Break
57	February 23	@ Orlando	W 112–103	Damian Lillard (33)	Jusuf Nurkic (12)	McCollum, Napier (6)	Amway Center; 17,437	24–33
58	February 26	@ Toronto	L 106–112	Damian Lillard (28)	Al-Farouq Aminu (8)	Damian Lillard (8)	Air Canada Centre; 19,800	24–34
59	February 28	@ Detroit	L 113–120 (OT)	Damian Lillard (34)	Damian Lillard (11)	Damian Lillard (9)	Palace of Auburn Hills; 13,502	24–35

March : 13–3 (home: 7–2; road: 6–1)

Game	Date	Team	Score	High points	High rebounds	High assists	Location Attendance	Record
60	March 2	Oklahoma City	W 114–109	Damian Lillard (33)	Jusuf Nurkic (12)	Jusuf Nurkic (6)	Moda Center; 19,875	25–35
61	March 4	Brooklyn	W 130–116	CJ McCollum (31)	Nurkic, Aminu (6)	Damian Lillard (11)	Moda Center; 19,638	26–35
62	March 7	@ Oklahoma City	W 126–121	Allen Crabbe (23)	Jusuf Nurkic (8)	Damian Lillard (8)	Chesapeake Energy Arena; 18,203	27–35
63	March 9	Philadelphia	W 114–108 (OT)	Jusuf Nurkic (28)	Jusuf Nurkic (20)	Jusuf Nurkic (8)	Moda Center; 19,240	28–35
64	March 11	Washington	L 124–125 (OT)	CJ McCollum (34)	Nurkic, Aminu (8)	Damian Lillard (7)	Moda Center; 19,482	28–36
65	March 12	@ Phoenix	W 110–101	Damian Lillard (39)	Al-Farouq Aminu (12)	CJ McCollum (4)	Talking Stick Resort Arena; 16,664	29–36
66	March 14	@ New Orleans	L 77–100	Damian Lillard (29)	Vonleh, Aminu (8)	Shabazz Napier (3)	Smoothie King Center; 15,530	29–37
67	March 15	@ San Antonio	W 110–106	Damian Lillard (36)	Jusuf Nurkic (9)	McCollum, Lillard (4)	AT&T Center; 18,418	30–37
68	March 18	@ Atlanta	W 113–97	Damian Lillard (27)	Noah Vonleh (11)	Jusuf Nurkic (6)	Philips Arena; 16,543	31–37
69	March 19	@ Miami	W 115–104	Damian Lillard (49)	Jusuf Nurkic (12)	McCollum, Lillard (5)	American Airlines Arena; 19,600	32–37
70	March 21	Milwaukee	L 90–93	Damian Lillard (31)	Jusuf Nurkic (14)	Damian Lillard (7)	Moda Center; 19,525	32–38
71	March 23	New York	W 110–95	Damian Lillard (30)	Noah Vonleh (11)	Damian Lillard (5)	Moda Center; 19,020	33–38
72	March 25	Minnesota	W 112–100	CJ McCollum (32)	Jusuf Nurkic (9)	Damian Lillard (8)	Moda Center; 19,580	34–38
73	March 26	@ L.A. Lakers	W 97–81	Damian Lillard (22)	Noah Vonleh (14)	Damian Lillard (5)	Staples Center; 18,698	35–38
74	March 28	Denver	W 122–113	CJ McCollum (37)	Jusuf Nurkic (16)	Damian Lillard (7)	Moda Center; 20,003	36–38
75	March 30	Houston	W 117–107	Damian Lillard (31)	Jusuf Nurkic (11)	Damian Lillard (11)	Moda Center; 20,049	37–38

April : 4–3 (home: 4–1; road: 0–2)

Game	Date	Team	Score	High points	High rebounds	High assists	Location Attendance	Record
76	April 1	Phoenix	W 130–117	Damian Lillard (31)	Meyers Leonard (13)	McCollum, Lillard (7)	Moda Center; 18,915	38–38
77	April 3	@ Minnesota	L 109–110	Damian Lillard (25)	Maurice Harkless (8)	Damian Lillard (6)	Target Center; 14,677	38–39
78	April 4	@ Utah	L 87–106	CJ McCollum (25)	CJ McCollum (6)	Damian Lillard (4)	Vivint Smart Home Arena; 19,911	38–40
79	April 6	Minnesota	W 105–98	Allen Crabbe (25)	Damian Lillard (9)	Damian Lillard (8)	Moda Center; 19,393	39–40
80	April 8	Utah	W 101–86	Damian Lillard (59)	Al-Farouq Aminu (12)	McCollum, Lillard (5)	Moda Center; 19,865	40–40
81	April 10	San Antonio	W 99–98	Shabazz Napier (32)	Noah Vonleh (11)	Evan Turner (7)	Moda Center; 19,393	41–40
82	April 12	New Orleans	L 100–103	Shabazz Napier (25)	Noah Vonleh (19)	Pat Connaughton (7)	Moda Center; 19,521	41–41

2016–17 season schedule

=== Playoffs ===
2017 playoff game log
Total: 0–4 (home: 0–2; road: 0–2)
First Round: 0–4 (home: 0–2; road: 0–2)

Game	Date	Team	Score	High points	High rebounds	High assists	Location Attendance	Series
1	April 16	@ Golden State	L 109–121	CJ McCollum (41)	Evan Turner (10)	Turner, Vonleh (4)	Oracle Arena; 19,596	0–1
2	April 19	@ Golden State	L 81–110	Maurice Harkless (15)	Maurice Harkless (8)	Evan Turner (7)	Oracle Arena; 19,596	0–2
3	April 22	Golden State	L 113–119	CJ McCollum (32)	Jusuf Nurkic (11)	Lillard, Nurkic (4)	Moda Center; 20,177	0–3
4	April 24	Golden State	L 103–128	Damian Lillard (34)	Noah Vonleh (14)	Damian Lillard (6)	Moda Center; 19,902	0–4

2017 playoff schedule

== Player statistics ==
Legend
GP	Games played	GS	Games started	MPG	Minutes per game
FG%	Field-goal percentage	3P%	3-point field-goal percentage	FT%	Free-throw percentage
RPG	Rebounds per game	APG	Assists per game	SPG	Steals per game
BPG	Blocks per game	PPG	Points per game

=== Regular season ===
Portland Trail Blazers statistics
Player	GP	GS	MPG	FG%	3P%	FT%	RPG	APG	SPG	BPG	PPG
CJ McCollum	80	80	35.0	.480	.421	.912	3.6	3.6	.9	.5	23.0
Allen Crabbe	79	7	28.5	.468	.444	.847	2.9	1.2	.7	.3	10.7
Maurice Harkless	77	69	28.9	.503	.351	.621	4.4	1.1	1.1	.9	10.0
Damian Lillard	75	75	35.9	.444	.370	.895	4.9	5.9	.9	.3	27.0
Noah Vonleh	74	41	17.1	.481	.350	.638	5.2	.4	.4	.4	4.4
Meyers Leonard	74	12	16.5	.386	.347	.875	3.2	1.0	.2	.4	5.4
Evan Turner	65	12	25.5	.426	.263	.825	3.8	3.2	.8	.4	9.0
Al-Farouq Aminu	61	25	29.1	.393	.330	.706	7.4	1.6	1.0	.7	8.7
Mason Plumlee^{†}	54	54	28.1	.532	.000	.567	8.0	4.0	.9	1.2	11.1
Shabazz Napier	53	2	9.7	.399	.370	.776	1.2	1.3	.6	.0	4.1
Ed Davis	46	12	17.2	.528		.617	5.3	.6	.3	.5	4.3
Pat Connaughton	39	1	8.1	.514	.515	.778	1.3	.7	.2	.1	2.5
Jake Layman	35	1	7.1	.292	.255	.765	.7	.3	.3	.1	2.2
Jusuf Nurkić^{†}	20	19	29.2	.508	.000	.660	10.4	3.2	1.3	1.9	15.2
Tim Quarterman	16	0	5.0	.448	.385	.000	.9	.7	.1	.2	1.9

=== Playoffs ===
Portland Trail Blazers statistics
Player	GP	GS	MPG	FG%	3P%	FT%	RPG	APG	SPG	BPG	PPG
Damian Lillard	4	4	37.8	.433	.281	.960	4.5	3.3	1.3	.5	27.8
CJ McCollum	4	4	35.0	.400	.500	.938	6.0	1.0	1.0	.5	22.5
Evan Turner	4	4	31.0	.364	.333	.750	5.8	3.8	1.8	.5	10.3
Maurice Harkless	4	4	24.8	.294	.167	.875	3.3	.8	1.3	1.3	7.3
Noah Vonleh	4	2	25.0	.444		.400	7.3	2.0	.3	.8	4.5
Al-Farouq Aminu	4	0	28.3	.459	.412	.636	6.5	1.0	.8	1.0	12.0
Allen Crabbe	4	0	23.0	.375	.231	.333	3.0	.5	.3	.0	5.5
Shabazz Napier	4	0	11.8	.421	.455	.750	1.0	.8	.5	.0	6.8
Meyers Leonard	3	1	10.3	.200	.000		2.7	.3	.0	.0	.7
Pat Connaughton	3	0	8.0	.222	.000	1.000	2.3	1.3	.0	.0	2.3
Jake Layman	2	0	8.0	.500	1.000	.500	.5	.5	.5	.0	3.0
Tim Quarterman	2	0	3.5	.500	.500		.0	.5	.0	.0	1.5
Jusuf Nurkić	1	1	17.0	.333	.000		11.0	4.0	.0	1.0	2.0

- ^{†} Denotes player spent time with another team in the season. Stats reflect time with the Trail Blazers only.

== Transactions ==
=== Trades ===
June 23, 2016	To Portland Trail Blazers Draft rights to Jake Layman	To Orlando Magic Future 2nd round-pick Cash considerations
July 7, 2016	To Portland Trail Blazers Shabazz Napier	To Orlando Magic Cash considerations

=== Free agency ===
==== Re-signed ====
Player	Signed
Meyers Leonard	4-year contract worth $41 million
Allen Crabbe	4-year contract worth $75 million
Maurice Harkless	4-year contract worth $40 million
CJ McCollum	4-year contract worth $106 million

==== Additions ====
Player	Signed	Former team
Evan Turner	4-year contract worth $70 million	Boston Celtics
Festus Ezeli	2-year contract worth $15.2 million	Golden State Warriors
Tim Quarterman	2-year contract worth $1.4 million	Louisiana State Tigers

==== Subtractions ====
Player	Reason left	New team
Brian Roberts	1-year contract worth $980,431	Charlotte Hornets
Gerald Henderson Jr.	2-year contract worth $18 million	Philadelphia 76ers
