= 2016–17 Minnesota Timberwolves season =

NBA professional basketball team season

- Head coach: Tom Thibodeau
- General manager: Scott Layden
- Owners: Glen Taylor
- Arena: Target Center

Results
- Record: 31–51 (.378)
- Place: Division: 5th (Northwest); Conference: 13th (Western)
- Playoff finish: Did not qualify
- Stats at Basketball Reference

Local media
- Television: Fox Sports North
- Radio: WCCO

The 2016–17 Minnesota Timberwolves season marked the franchise's 28th season in the National Basketball Association (NBA). On April 20, 2016, the Timberwolves appointed Tom Thibodeau as their new head coach. On September 23, 2016, veteran forward Kevin Garnett announced his retirement from the NBA, ending his 21-year career. Ahead of the following season, the team revealed updated logos and uniforms on April 11, 2017.

Minnesota improved upon its 29–53 record from the prior season but finished with a 31–51 record, failing to secure a playoff berth. This extended the franchise's postseason drought to 13 consecutive seasons, tying the NBA record for the longest playoff absence in league history.

== Draft ==
Round	Pick	Player	Position	Nationality	College
1	5	Kris Dunn	PG	United States	Providence

The Timberwolves entered the draft with one first-round pick. Their second-round pick was conveyed to Boston Celtics as a replacement for Minnesota's unconveyed first-round pick after the team missed the playoffs from 2014 to 2016, causing the first-rounder to fall within the protected top-12 and top-13 ranges.

== Roster ==
2016-17 Minnesota Timberwolves roster
Players

Pos.	No.	Player	Height	Weight	DOB	From
C	45	Cole Aldrich	6 ft 11 in (2.11 m)	250 lb (113 kg)	1988-10-31	Kansas
SF	88	Nemanja Bjelica	6 ft 10 in (2.08 m)	225 lb (102 kg)	1988-05-09	Serbia
SF	18	Omri Casspi	6 ft 9 in (2.06 m)	225 lb (102 kg)	1988-06-22	Israel
PF	5	Gorgui Dieng	6 ft 11 in (2.11 m)	240 lb (109 kg)	1990-01-18	Louisville
PG	3	Kris Dunn	6 ft 4 in (1.93 m)	205 lb (93 kg)	1994-03-18	Providence
C	27	Jordan Hill	6 ft 10 in (2.08 m)	240 lb (109 kg)	1987-07-27	Arizona
PG	1	Tyus Jones	6 ft 2 in (1.88 m)	195 lb (88 kg)	1996-05-10	Duke
SG	8	Zach LaVine	6 ft 5 in (1.96 m)	185 lb (84 kg)	1995-03-10	UCLA
SF	15	Shabazz Muhammad	6 ft 6 in (1.98 m)	223 lb (101 kg)	1992-11-13	UCLA
PF	33	Adreian Payne	6 ft 10 in (2.08 m)	237 lb (108 kg)	1991-02-19	Michigan State
C	14	Nikola Peković	6 ft 11 in (2.11 m)	307 lb (139 kg)	1986-01-03	Montenegro
PG	9	Ricky Rubio	6 ft 4 in (1.93 m)	190 lb (86 kg)	1990-10-21	Spain
SG	4	Brandon Rush	6 ft 6 in (1.98 m)	225 lb (102 kg)	1985-07-07	Kansas
C	32	Karl-Anthony Towns	7 ft 0 in (2.13 m)	244 lb (111 kg)	1995-11-15	Kentucky
SG	22	Andrew Wiggins	6 ft 8 in (2.03 m)	200 lb (91 kg)	1995-02-23	Kansas

Coaches
Head coach
- Tom Thibodeau
Assistant(s)
- Rick Brunson
- Andy Greer
- Ed Pinckney
- Ryan Saunders
- Vince Legarza (player development)

Legend
- (DP) Unsigned draft pick
- (FA) Free agent
- (S) Suspended
- (DL) On assignment to D-League affiliate
- Injured

Roster
Updated: 2017-04-03

== Standings ==
=== Division ===
Northwest Division	W	L	PCT	GB	Home	Road	Div	GP
y – Utah Jazz	51	31	.622	–	29‍–‍12	22‍–‍19	8–8	82
x – Oklahoma City Thunder	47	35	.573	4.0	28‍–‍13	19‍–‍22	10–6	82
x – Portland Trail Blazers	41	41	.500	10.0	25‍–‍16	16‍–‍25	11–5	82
e – Denver Nuggets	40	42	.488	11.0	22‍–‍19	18‍–‍23	6–10	82
e – Minnesota Timberwolves	31	51	.378	20.0	20‍–‍21	11‍–‍30	5–11	82

=== Conference ===
Western Conference
#	Team	W	L	PCT	GB	GP
1	z – Golden State Warriors *	67	15	.817	–	82
2	y – San Antonio Spurs *	61	21	.744	6.0	82
3	x – Houston Rockets	55	27	.671	12.0	82
4	x – Los Angeles Clippers	51	31	.622	16.0	82
5	y – Utah Jazz *	51	31	.622	16.0	82
6	x – Oklahoma City Thunder	47	35	.573	20.0	82
7	x – Memphis Grizzlies	43	39	.524	24.0	82
8	x – Portland Trail Blazers	41	41	.500	26.0	82
9	e – Denver Nuggets	40	42	.488	27.0	82
10	e – New Orleans Pelicans	34	48	.415	33.0	82
11	e – Dallas Mavericks	33	49	.402	34.0	82
12	e – Sacramento Kings	32	50	.390	35.0	82
13	e – Minnesota Timberwolves	31	51	.378	36.0	82
14	e – Los Angeles Lakers	26	56	.317	41.0	82
15	e – Phoenix Suns	24	58	.293	43.0	82

== Game log ==
=== Pre-season ===
2016 pre-season game log
Total: 5–2 (Home: 3–0; Road: 2–2)
Pre-season: 5–2 (home: 3–0; road: 2–2)

Game	Date	Team	Score	High points	High rebounds	High assists	Location Attendance	Record
1	October 8	@ Miami	109–100	Karl-Anthony Towns (20)	Karl-Anthony Towns (10)	Kris Dunn (7)	American Airlines Arena; 13,042	1–0
2	October 10	@ Charlotte	86–98	Zach LaVine (30)	Cole Aldrich (9)	Kris Dunn (3)	Spectrum Center; 8,424	1–1
3	October 12	Denver	105–88	Muhammad, Towns, Wiggins (18)	Karl-Anthony Towns (8)	Ricky Rubio (8)	Pinnacle Bank Arena; 7,153	2–1
4	October 15	@ Miami	101–96	Andrew Wiggins (23)	Karl-Anthony Towns (14)	Ricky Rubio (6)	KFC Yum! Center; 9,672	3–1
5	October 16	@ Oklahoma City	94–112	John Lucas III (18)	Aldrich, Bjelica, Hill (6)	Kris Dunn (6)	Chesapeake Energy Arena; 10,489	3–2
6	October 19	Memphis	101–94	Karl-Anthony Towns (31)	Gorgui Dieng (11)	Ricky Rubio (7)	Target Center; 9,594	4–2
7	October 21	Charlotte	109–74	Shabazz Muhammad (17)	Karl-Anthony Towns (9)	Ricky Rubio (6)	Target Center; 9,708	5–2

2016–17 season schedule

=== Regular season ===
2016–17 game log
Total: 31–51 (Home: 20–21; Road: 11–30)
October: 0–2 (home: 0–0; road: 0–2)

Game	Date	Team	Score	High points	High rebounds	High assists	Location Attendance	Record
1	October 26	@ Memphis	L 98–102	Andrew Wiggins (25)	Gorgui Dieng (14)	Ricky Rubio (8)	FedExForum; 18,119	0–1
2	October 29	@ Sacramento	L 103–106	Andrew Wiggins (29)	Gorgui Dieng (13)	Ricky Rubio (5)	Golden 1 Center; 17,608	0–2

November : 5–11 (home: 3–6; road: 2–5)

Game	Date	Team	Score	High points	High rebounds	High assists	Location Attendance	Record
3	November 1	Memphis	W 116–80	Zach LaVine (31)	Karl-Anthony Towns (10)	Kris Dunn (6)	Target Center; 14,774	1–2
4	November 3	Denver	L 99–102	Karl-Anthony Towns (32)	Karl-Anthony Towns (14)	Kris Dunn (9)	Target Center; 11,219	1–3
5	November 5	@ Oklahoma City	L 92–112	Karl-Anthony Towns (33)	Gorgui Dieng (8)	Tyus Jones (4)	Chesapeake Energy Arena; 18,203	1–4
6	November 8	@ Brooklyn	L 110–119	Andrew Wiggins (36)	Andrew Wiggins (8)	Tyus Jones (7)	Barclays Center; 13,610	1–5
7	November 9	@ Orlando	W 123–107	Zach LaVine (37)	Towns, Dieng (11)	Gorgui Dieng (7)	Amway Center; 17,102	2–5
8	November 12	L.A. Clippers	L 105–119	Karl-Anthony Towns (24)	Karl-Anthony Towns (10)	Ricky Rubio (6)	Target Center; 14,494	2–6
9	November 13	L.A. Lakers	W 125–99	Andrew Wiggins (47)	Karl-Anthony Towns (12)	Ricky Rubio (10)	Target Center; 14,432	3–6
10	November 15	Charlotte	L 108–115	Andrew Wiggins (29)	Gorgui Dieng (11)	Ricky Rubio (8)	Target Center; 10,349	3–7
11	November 17	Philadelphia	W 110–86	Andrew Wiggins (35)	Dieng, Towns, Wiggins (10)	Ricky Rubio (5)	Target Center; 16,866	4–7
12	November 19	@ Memphis	L 71–93	Zach LaVine (22)	Gorgui Dieng (11)	Ricky Rubio (7)	FedExForum; 17,112	4–8
13	November 21	Boston	L 93–99	Karl-Anthony Towns (27)	Karl-Anthony Towns (18)	Ricky Rubio (9)	Target Center; 13,167	4–9
14	November 23	@ New Orleans	L 96–117	Zach LaVine (26)	Karl-Anthony Towns (11)	Rubio, Dieng (5)	Smoothie King Center; 15,555	4–10
15	November 25	@ Phoenix	W 98–85	Andrew Wiggins (25)	Karl-Anthony Towns (10)	Rubio, Towns (4)	Talking Stick Resort Arena; 16,728	5–10
16	November 26	@ Golden State	L 102–115	Zach LaVine (31)	Karl-Anthony Towns (9)	Ricky Rubio (7)	Oracle Arena; 19,596	5–11
17	November 28	Utah	L 103–112	Zach LaVine (28)	Karl-Anthony Towns (12)	Zach LaVine (8)	Target Center; 9,384	5–12
18	November 30	New York	L 104–106	Karl-Anthony Towns (47)	Karl-Anthony Towns (18)	Ricky Rubio (6)	Target Center; 13,987	5–13

December : 6–9 (home: 3–5; road: 3–4)

Game	Date	Team	Score	High points	High rebounds	High assists	Location Attendance	Record
19	December 2	@ New York	L 114–118	Zach LaVine (23)	Cole Aldrich (12)	Ricky Rubio (6)	Madison Square Garden; 19,812	5–14
20	December 3	@ Charlotte	W 125–120 (OT)	Andrew Wiggins (29)	Karl-Anthony Towns (15)	Ricky Rubio (12)	Spectrum Center; 16,982	6–14
21	December 6	San Antonio	L 91–105	Zach LaVine (25)	Karl-Anthony Towns (14)	Ricky Rubio (6)	Target Center; 12,585	6–15
22	December 8	@ Toronto	L 110–124	Zach LaVine (29)	Karl-Anthony Towns (11)	Zach LaVine (6)	Air Canada Centre; 19,800	6–16
23	December 9	Detroit	L 90–117	Andrew Wiggins (16)	Karl-Anthony Towns (12)	Ricky Rubio (6)	Target Center; 14,109	6–17
24	December 11	Golden State	L 108–116	Wiggins, Towns, LaVine (25)	Karl-Anthony Towns (18)	Ricky Rubio (6)	Target Center; 18,452	6−18
25	December 13	@ Chicago	W 99–94	Zach LaVine (24)	Karl-Anthony Towns (12)	Ricky Rubio (10)	United Center; 21,146	7–18
26	December 17	Houston	L 109–111 (OT)	Karl-Anthony Towns (41)	Karl-Anthony Towns (15)	Ricky Rubio (7)	Target Center; 14,689	7–19
27	December 19	Phoenix	W 115–108	Karl-Anthony Towns (28)	Karl-Anthony Towns (15)	Ricky Rubio (12)	Target Center; 12,008	8–19
28	December 21	@ Atlanta	W 92–84	Andrew Wiggins (19)	Karl-Anthony Towns (18)	Ricky Rubio (8)	Philips Arena; 17,578	9–19
29	December 23	Sacramento	L 105–109	Zach LaVine (40)	Karl-Anthony Towns (13)	Ricky Rubio (8)	Target Center; 13,288	9–20
30	December 25	@ Oklahoma City	L 100–112	Karl-Anthony Towns (26)	Karl-Anthony Towns (8)	Ricky Rubio (10)	Chesapeake Energy Arena; 18,203	9–21
31	December 26	Atlanta	W 104–90	Karl-Anthony Towns (22)	Karl-Anthony Towns (11)	Ricky Rubio (10)	Target Center; 15,617	10–21
32	December 28	@ Denver	L 103–105	Andrew Wiggins (25)	Karl-Anthony Towns (11)	Karl-Anthony Towns (10)	Pepsi Center; 15,093	10–22
33	December 30	Milwaukee	W 116–99	Andrew Wiggins (31)	Karl-Anthony Towns (16)	Ricky Rubio (9)	Target Center; 17,779	11–22

January : 8–7 (home: 6–3; road: 2–4)

Game	Date	Team	Score	High points	High rebounds	High assists	Location Attendance	Record
34	January 1	Portland	L 89–95	Andrew Wiggins (24)	Karl-Anthony Towns (13)	Towns, Rubio (6)	Target Center; 15,804	11–23
35	January 3	@ Philadelphia	L 91–93	Zach LaVine (28)	Karl-Anthony Towns (13)	Towns, Rubio (5)	Wells Fargo Center; 17,124	11–24
36	January 6	@ Washington	L 105–112	Andrew Wiggins (41)	Gorgui Dieng (11)	Ricky Rubio (7)	Verizon Center; 18,686	11–25
37	January 7	Utah	L 92–94	Zach LaVine (24)	Karl-Anthony Towns (12)	Ricky Rubio (7)	Target Center; 13,945	11–26
38	January 9	Dallas	W 101–92	Karl-Anthony Towns (34)	Karl-Anthony Towns (11)	Ricky Rubio (15)	Target Center; 9,625	12–26
39	January 11	Houston	W 119–105	Andrew Wiggins (28)	Karl-Anthony Towns (18)	Ricky Rubio (17)	Target Center; 9,625	13–26
40	January 13	Oklahoma City	W 96–86	Karl-Anthony Towns (29)	Karl-Anthony Towns (17)	Ricky Rubio (14)	Target Center; 16,644	14–26
41	January 15	@ Dallas	L 87–98	Gorgui Dieng (21)	Karl-Anthony Towns (9)	Ricky Rubio (10)	American Airlines Center; 19,655	14–27
42	January 17	@ San Antonio	L 114–122	Karl-Anthony Towns (27)	Karl-Anthony Towns (16)	Ricky Rubio (14)	AT&T Center; 18,418	14–28
43	January 19	@ LA Clippers	W 104–101	Karl-Anthony Towns (37)	Karl-Anthony Towns (12)	Karl-Anthony Towns (5)	Staples Center; 19,060	15–28
44	January 22	Denver	W 111–108	Karl-Anthony Towns (32)	Karl-Anthony Towns (12)	Kris Dunn (9)	Target Center; 12,788	16–28
45	January 24	@ Phoenix	W 112–111	Andrew Wiggins (31)	Karl-Anthony Towns (10)	Ricky Rubio (10)	Talking Stick Resort Arena; 17,241	17–28
46	January 26	Indiana	L 103–109	Karl-Anthony Towns (23)	Karl-Anthony Towns (10)	Ricky Rubio (12)	Target Center; 14,862	17–29
47	January 28	Brooklyn	W 129–109	Karl-Anthony Towns (37)	Karl-Anthony Towns (13)	Kris Dunn (7)	Target Center; 14,798	18–29
48	January 30	Orlando	W 111–105 (OT)	Andrew Wiggins (27)	Gorgui Dieng (14)	Ricky Rubio (12)	Target Center; 11,124	19–29

February : 5–7 (home: 3–4; road: 2–3)

Game	Date	Team	Score	High points	High rebounds	High assists	Location Attendance	Record
49	February 1	@ Cleveland	L 97–125	Karl-Anthony Towns (26)	Karl-Anthony Towns (12)	Ricky Rubio (14)	Quicken Loans Arena; 20,562	19–30
50	February 3	@ Detroit	L 108–116	Karl-Anthony Towns (24)	Gorgui Dieng (12)	Ricky Rubio (7)	The Palace of Auburn Hills; 16,934	19–31
51	February 4	Memphis	L 99–107	Karl-Anthony Towns (27)	Karl-Anthony Towns (16)	Rubio, Jones (6)	Target Center; 15,081	19–32
52	February 6	Miami	L 111–113	Karl-Anthony Towns (35)	Karl-Anthony Towns (8)	Ricky Rubio (13)	Target Center; 12,502	19–33
53	February 8	Toronto	W 112–109	Andrew Wiggins (31)	Karl-Anthony Towns (14)	Ricky Rubio (7)	Target Center; 13,832	20–33
54	February 10	New Orleans	L 106–122	Karl-Anthony Towns (36)	Dieng, Towns (8)	Ricky Rubio (12)	Target Center; 16,093	20–34
55	February 12	Chicago	W 117–89	Andrew Wiggins (27)	Gorgui Dieng (13)	Ricky Rubio (11)	Target Center; 19,356	21–34
56	February 14	Cleveland	L 108–116	Andrew Wiggins (41)	Gorgui Dieng (10)	Ricky Rubio (16)	Target Center; 17,738	21–35
57	February 15	@ Denver	W 112–99	Andrew Wiggins (40)	Karl-Anthony Towns (19)	Rubio, Dunn (5)	Pepsi Center; 13,924	22–35
58	February 24	Dallas	W 97–84	Andrew Wiggins (27)	Karl-Anthony Towns (18)	Ricky Rubio (14)	Target Center; 15,948	23–35
59	February 25	@ Houston	L 130–142	Karl-Anthony Towns (37)	Karl-Anthony Towns (22)	Ricky Rubio (11)	Toyota Center; 18,055	23–36
60	February 27	@ Sacramento	W 102–88	Karl-Anthony Towns (29)	Karl-Anthony Towns (17)	Ricky Rubio (11)	Golden 1 Center; 17,608	24–36

March : 6–8 (home: 4–1; road: 2–7)

Game	Date	Team	Score	High points	High rebounds	High assists	Location Attendance	Record
61	March 1	@ Utah	W 107–80	Karl-Anthony Towns (21)	Karl-Anthony Towns (15)	Ricky Rubio (9)	Vivint Smart Home Arena; 19,590	25–36
62	March 4	@ San Antonio	L 90–97 (OT)	Karl-Anthony Towns (24)	Karl-Anthony Towns (14)	Ricky Rubio (10)	AT&T Center; 18,418	25–37
63	March 8	L. A. Clippers	W 107–91	Karl-Anthony Towns (29)	Karl-Anthony Towns (14)	Ricky Rubio (12)	Target Center; 14,933	26–37
64	March 10	Golden State	W 103–102	Andrew Wiggins (24)	Nemanja Bjelica (12)	Ricky Rubio (13)	Target Center; 20,412	27−37
65	March 11	@ Milwaukee	L 95–102	Karl-Anthony Towns (35)	Karl-Anthony Towns (14)	Ricky Rubio (8)	Bradley Center; 18,717	27–38
66	March 13	Washington	W 119–104	Karl-Anthony Towns (39)	Karl-Anthony Towns (13)	Ricky Rubio (19)	Target Center; 15,747	28–38
67	March 15	@ Boston	L 104–117	Ricky Rubio (23)	Karl-Anthony Towns (14)	Ricky Rubio (7)	TD Garden; 18,624	28–39
68	March 17	@ Miami	L 105–123	Karl-Anthony Towns (31)	Karl-Anthony Towns (11)	Ricky Rubio (6)	American Airlines Arena; 19,600	28–40
69	March 19	@ New Orleans	L 109–123	Karl-Anthony Towns (33)	Gorgui Dieng (10)	Ricky Rubio (14)	Smoothie King Center; 16,111	28–41
70	March 21	San Antonio	L 93–100	Karl-Anthony Towns (25)	Karl-Anthony Towns (14)	Ricky Rubio (7)	Target Center; 13,742	28–42
71	March 24	@ L.A. Lakers	L 119–130 (OT)	Andrew Wiggins (36)	Karl-Anthony Towns (13)	Ricky Rubio (15)	Staples Center; 18,997	28–43
72	March 25	@ Portland	L 100–112	Andrew Wiggins (20)	Gorgui Dieng (7)	Rubio, Jones (4)	Moda Center; 19,580	28–44
73	March 28	@ Indiana	W 115–114	Karl-Anthony Towns (37)	Karl-Anthony Towns (12)	Ricky Rubio (10)	Bankers Life Fieldhouse; 17,534	29–44
74	March 30	L.A. Lakers	W 119–104	Ricky Rubio (33)	Gorgui Dieng (15)	Ricky Rubio (10)	Target Center; 18,179	30–44

April : 1–7 (home: 1–2; road: 0–5)

Game	Date	Team	Score	High points	High rebounds	High assists	Location Attendance	Record
75	April 1	Sacramento	L 117–123	Andrew Wiggins (32)	Karl-Anthony Towns (11)	Ricky Rubio (13)	Target Center; 18,960	30–45
76	April 3	Portland	W 110–109	Karl-Anthony Towns (34)	Karl-Anthony Towns (12)	Ricky Rubio (16)	Target Center; 14,677	31–45
77	April 4	@ Golden State	L 107–121	Muhammad, Wiggins (24)	Shabazz Muhammad (11)	Ricky Rubio (5)	Oracle Arena; 19,596	31−46
78	April 6	@ Portland	L 98–105	Andrew Wiggins (36)	Karl-Anthony Towns (16)	Ricky Rubio (5)	Moda Center; 19,393	31–47
79	April 7	@ Utah	L 113–120	Karl-Anthony Towns (32)	Karl-Anthony Towns (13)	Ricky Rubio (12)	Vivint Smart Home Arena; 19,911	31–48
80	April 9	@ L.A. Lakers	L 109–110	Andrew Wiggins (41)	Karl-Anthony Towns (21)	Ricky Rubio (11)	Staples Center; 18,997	31–49
81	April 11	Oklahoma City	L 98–100	Karl-Anthony Towns (26)	Karl-Anthony Towns (12)	Ricky Rubio (10)	Target Center; 19,356	31–50
82	April 12	@ Houston	L 118–123	Karl-Anthony Towns (28)	Karl-Anthony Towns (21)	Kris Dunn (16)	Toyota Center; 18,055	31–51

2016–17 season schedule

== Player statistics ==
=== Regular season ===
Player	POS	GP	GS	MP	REB	AST	STL	BLK	PTS	MPG	RPG	APG	SPG	BPG	PPG
Andrew Wiggins	SF	82	82	3,048	328	189	82	30	1,933	37.2	4.0	2.3	1.0	.4	23.6
Karl-Anthony Towns	C	82	82	3,030	1,007	220	56	103	2,061	37.0	12.3	2.7	.7	1.3	25.1
Gorgui Dieng	PF	82	82	2,653	647	158	88	95	816	32.4	7.9	1.9	1.1	1.2	10.0
Kris Dunn	PG	78	7	1,333	166	188	78	36	293	17.1	2.1	2.4	1.0	.5	3.8
Shabazz Muhammad	SF	78	1	1,516	220	35	22	6	772	19.4	2.8	.4	.3	.1	9.9
Ricky Rubio	PG	75	75	2,469	305	682	128	10	836	32.9	4.1	9.1	1.7	.1	11.1
Nemanja Bjelica	PF	65	1	1,190	244	79	40	20	403	18.3	3.8	1.2	.6	.3	6.2
Cole Aldrich	C	62	0	531	158	25	25	23	105	8.6	2.5	.4	.4	.4	1.7
Tyus Jones	PG	60	0	774	67	156	48	5	209	12.9	1.1	2.6	.8	.1	3.5
Zach LaVine	SG	47	47	1,749	160	139	41	10	889	37.2	3.4	3.0	.9	.2	18.9
Brandon Rush	SG	47	33	1,030	99	45	22	23	197	21.9	2.1	1.0	.5	.5	4.2
Adreian Payne	PF	18	0	135	33	7	8	7	63	7.5	1.8	.4	.4	.4	3.5
Omri Casspi^{†}	PF	13	0	222	20	11	13	2	45	17.1	1.5	.8	1.0	.2	3.5
Jordan Hill	C	7	0	47	14	0	1	0	12	6.7	2.0	.0	.1	.0	1.7
Lance Stephenson^{†}	SG	6	0	67	10	5	0	0	21	11.2	1.7	.8	.0	.0	3.5
John Lucas III	PG	5	0	11	0	1	2	0	2	2.2	.0	.2	.4	.0	.4

- ^{†} Denotes player spent time with another team in the season. Stats reflect time with the Timberwolves only.

== Transactions ==
=== Free agents ===
==== Re-signed ====
Player	Signed
Gorgui Dieng	4-year contract extension worth $64 million

==== Additions ====
Player	Signed	Former Team
Brandon Rush	1-year contract worth $3.5 million	Golden State Warriors
Cole Aldrich	3-year contract worth $22 million	Los Angeles Clippers
Jordan Hill	2-year contract worth $8 million	Indiana Pacers
John Lucas III	1-year contract worth $635,753	Piratas de Quebradillas
Lance Stephenson	10-day contract worth $72,193	New Orleans Pelicans
Omri Casspi	1-year contract worth $185,710	New Orleans Pelicans

==== Subtractions ====
Player	Reason left	New team
John Lucas III	Waived	
Lance Stephenson	3-year contract worth $12 million	Indiana Pacers
