= Tim Quarterman =

American basketball player (born 1994)

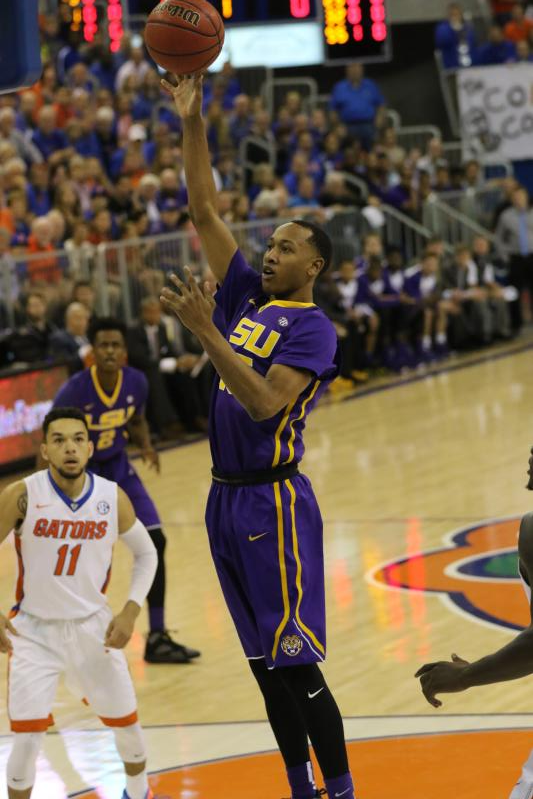
- Quarterman playing for LSU in 2016

Personal information
- Born: October 27, 1994 (age 32) Savannah, Georgia, U.S.
- Listed height: 6 ft 6 in (1.98 m)
- Listed weight: 190 lb (86 kg)

Career information
- High school: Sol C. Johnson (Savannah, Georgia)
- College: LSU (2013–2016)
- NBA draft: 2016: undrafted
- Playing career: 2016–2023
- Position: Point guard / shooting guard
- Number: 55, 1, 23

Career history
- 2016–2017: Portland Trail Blazers
- 2017: →Windy City Bulls
- 2017: →Long Island Nets
- 2018: Agua Caliente Clippers
- 2018: Houston Rockets
- 2018: Ironi Nahariya
- 2019: Super City Rangers
- 2020: Sioux Falls Skyforce
- 2022: Caballeros de Culiacán
- 2022: KK Feniks 2010
- 2023: Shreveport Mavericks

Career highlights
- NBL scoring champion (2019)
- Stats at NBA.com
- Stats at Basketball Reference

Tim Quarterman (born October 27, 1994) is an American former professional basketball player. He played college basketball for the LSU Tigers.

== High school career ==
A 6 ft 6 in (1.98 m) guard from Savannah, Georgia, Quarterman attended Sol C. Johnson High School. As a senior, he averaged 19.5 points, 6.2 rebounds, 5.1 assists and 3.4 steals per game, leading the Atom Smashers to the Class AAA state title.

== College career ==
Quarterman came to LSU in 2013. He was a starter for the Tigers as a sophomore and junior and averaged 8.4 points (39.7% FG, 31.0% 3PT, 66.0% FT), 3.9 rebounds, 3.1 assists and 1.04 steals in 98 games (three seasons).

As a junior, Quarterman averaged 11.2 points, 4.6 rebounds, 3.6 assists and 0.97 steals in 33 games and following the season, he declared for the 2016 NBA draft.

== Professional career ==
=== Portland Trail Blazers (2016–2017) ===
After going undrafted in the 2016 NBA draft, Quarterman joined the Charlotte Hornets for the 2016 NBA Summer League. On July 25, 2016, he signed with the Portland Trail Blazers. Quarterman made his NBA debut on November 9, 2016, in a 111–80 loss to the Los Angeles Clippers, recording four points and one rebound in six minutes off the bench. In the Trail Blazers' regular-season finale on April 12, 2017, Quarterman scored a career-high 10 points on 4-of-11 shooting in a 103–100 loss to the New Orleans Pelicans. During his rookie season, Quarterman had multiple assignments with the Windy City Bulls and Long Island Nets of the NBA Development League, pursuant to the flexible assignment rule.

=== Agua Caliente Clippers (2018) ===
On June 28, 2017, Quarterman was traded to the Houston Rockets in exchange for cash considerations. He was waived by the Rockets on October 13.

On January 2, 2018, Quarterman signed with the Jiangsu Dragons of the Chinese Basketball Association, but due to visa issues, he was replaced on the roster before appearing in a game.

In February 2018, Quarterman joined the Agua Caliente Clippers of the NBA G League, averaging 8.9 points in 11 games.

=== Houston Rockets (2018) ===
Quarterman signed with the Houston Rockets on March 30, only to be waived on April 12 after seeing action in three games.

=== Ironi Nahariya (2018) ===
On November 22, 2018, Quarterman signed a one-month contract with Ironi Nahariya of the Israeli Premier League. He parted ways with Nahariya on January 1, 2019, after appearing in three games. He averaged 5.0 points, 4.0 rebounds and 3.7 assists in 24.0 minutes per game.

=== Super City Rangers (2019) ===
On April 8, 2019, Quarterman signed with the Super City Rangers for the 2019 New Zealand NBL season. He parted ways with the Rangers on June 29, 2019. In 15 games (all starts) for the Rangers, Quarterman posted averages of 28.1 points, 5.6 assists and 5.5 rebounds in over 36 minutes per game.

=== Sioux Falls Skyforce (2020) ===
On January 27, 2020, Quarterman was acquired by the Sioux Falls Skyforce of the NBA G League.

=== Caballeros de Culiacán (2022) ===
On April 10, 2022, Quarterman signed with Caballeros de Culiacán of the CIBACOPA.

=== KK Feniks 2010 (2022) ===
Quarterman began the 2022–23 season with KK Feniks 2010 of the Macedonian First League, playing four games between December 3 and December 25.

=== Shreveport Mavericks (2023) ===
In March 2023, Quarterman had a one-game stint with the Shreveport Mavericks of The Basketball League.

== Personal life ==
He is the son of Melissa Quarterman and majored in sports administration.

=== Legal issues ===
On January 20, 2018, Quarterman was arrested in Tupelo, Mississippi, on charges of aggravated assault and felony fleeing.

On August 7, 2020, Quarterman was arrested in Savannah, Georgia, after a narcotics investigation resulted in officers finding guns and marijuana in a residence.

== NBA career statistics ==
Legend
GP	Games played	GS	Games started	MPG	Minutes per game
FG%	Field goal percentage	3P%	3-point field goal percentage	FT%	Free throw percentage
RPG	Rebounds per game	APG	Assists per game	SPG	Steals per game
BPG	Blocks per game	PPG	Points per game	**Bold**	Career high

=== Regular season ===
Year	Team	GP	GS	MPG	FG%	3P%	FT%	RPG	APG	SPG	BPG	PPG
2016–17	Portland	**16**	0	**5.0**	**.448**	**.385**	.000	.9	**.7**	**.1**	**.2**	**1.9**
2017–18	Houston	3	0	4.3	.333	.000	**1.000**	**1.0**	.3	.0	.0	1.3
Career		19	0	4.9	.438	.333	.400	.9	.6	.1	.2	1.8

=== Playoffs ===
Year	Team	GP	GS	MPG	FG%	3P%	FT%	RPG	APG	SPG	BPG	PPG
2017	Portland	2	0	3.5	.500	.500	.000	.0	.5	.0	.0	1.5
Career		2	0	3.5	.500	.500	.000	.0	.5	.0	.0	1.5
