= Festus Ezeli =

Nigerian basketball player (born 1989)

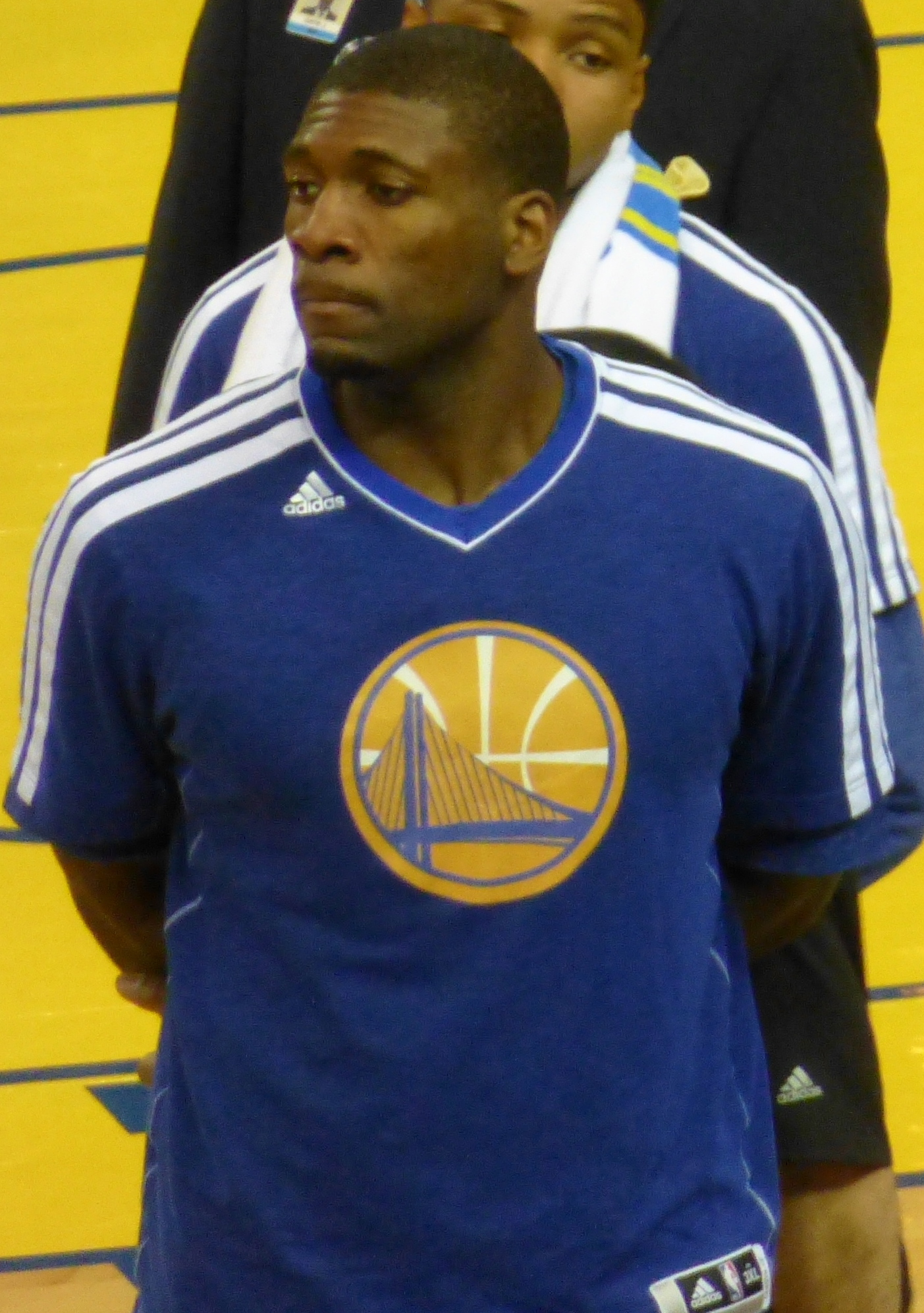
- Ezeli with the Golden State Warriors in 2013

Personal information
- Born: October 21, 1989 (age 37) Benin City, Nigeria
- Listed height: 6 ft 11 in (2.11 m)
- Listed weight: 265 lb (120 kg)

Career information
- High school: Igbinedion Education Centre (Benin City, Nigeria); Jesuit (Sacramento, California)
- College: Vanderbilt (2008–2012)
- NBA draft: 2012: 1st round, 30th overall pick
- Drafted by: Golden State Warriors
- Playing career: 2012–2016; 2021
- Position: Center
- Number: 31, 20

Career history
- 2012–2016: Golden State Warriors
- 2015: →Santa Cruz Warriors
- 2021: Westchester Knicks

Career highlights
- NBA champion (2015); Second-team All-SEC (2011)
- Stats at NBA.com
- Stats at Basketball Reference

Ifeanyi Festus Ezeli-Ndulue (born October 21, 1989) is a Nigerian-American former professional basketball player who played five seasons in the National Basketball Association (NBA). He played college basketball for the Vanderbilt Commodores before being selected with the 30th overall pick in the 2012 NBA draft by the Golden State Warriors, where he won an NBA Championship in 2015. Ezeli last appeared in the 2016 NBA Finals and did not play basketball due to knee surgery in the 2017 season, then coming back in 2021.

== Early life ==
=== Life in Nigeria ===
One of five children, Ezeli remembered in a 2011 interview with Andy Katz of ESPN.com, "My parents told me I was an unusual child. My first name is Ifeanyi, and that means 'nothing is impossible with God'. That sets the tone for my journey while I'm alive." Ezeli concentrated on academics, graduating from high school when he was only 14, and aspiring to become a physician. To further his career goals, Ezeli's parents sent him to live with his uncle, a pediatrician, in Yuba City, California in 2004.

=== Life in America ===
Shortly after Ezeli arrived in Yuba City, his uncle encouraged him to take up what seemed to be the most appropriate sport for a 6-foot-8-inch (2.03 m) teenager—basketball. This proved much more difficult for Ezeli than academics because he had never played any organized sports despite the fact that Ezeli played soccer as a child. He took a year of classes at Jesuit High School in Sacramento but did not play basketball; different sources report that Ezeli was either ineligible to play because he had graduated from high school in Nigeria or cut during tryouts. The start of Ezeli's organized basketball career, with a low-level AAU team, was especially inauspicious since his first points were scored in his own team's basket. Recalling that incident, Ezeli said, "Everybody was running up the court, and I was just running with them. It's kind of surreal. Sometimes I think about it now and I'm like, Damn. How did I get here?"

Also in the Katz interview, Ezeli remarked on his struggles to learn the game:

"I didn't know what I was doing. Imagine someone who is 14 or 15 years old, and you're teaching them as if they're a 6-year-old. It was tough. Everyone was getting frustrated with me. I was getting frustrated with it. I tried playing in 2005. I stopped. I tried again in 2006. And when I had my first dunk in a summer league game in Las Vegas in 2006, that's when I was so excited. It was so exhilarating that I started to like it."

At age 16, Ezeli joined a second AAU team and also enrolled part-time at Yuba Community College. By not attending full-time, he retained a full four years of college eligibility and was still able to practice with the team; Ezeli also served as the team's videographer. Although still learning the most basic of basketball skills, Ezeli made his high-level competitive debut on the AAU circuit in the summer of 2007. By then, Ezeli had reached 6 feet 11 inches (2.11 m), and averaged 10 points, 11 rebounds, and three blocks per game, earning an invitation to the Reebok All-American Camp in July 2007.

=== Recruitment ===
Ezeli's appearance at the camp marked a major turning point in his life. According to Sports Illustrated writer Pablo Torre,

"Recruiters...awaited his arrival as if he were Bigfoot. They left with their heads spinning at Ezeli's size and raw potential, even if it was clear that he lacked confidence. Offers from 27 Division I schools he knew almost nothing about rolled in."

With the help of his AAU coaches, Ezeli narrowed his list to Boston College, Connecticut, Harvard, and Vanderbilt. The Vanderbilt coaching staff sold Ezeli on the school, citing its academic reputation and the program's recent experience with international players. Head coach Kevin Stallings added that Ezeli would be able to redshirt his first year at the school to allow him more time to develop, since the program had a highly touted Australian prospect, A.J. Ogilvy, arriving at the same time and playing Ezeli's position.

== College career ==
Ezeli arrived in Nashville in 2007 as a biology major and among the rawest of basketball prospects. During his first two years in the program, while still learning many of the basics of the sport, Ezeli was frequently dominated in practice by Ogilvy. However, as early as midway through his redshirt freshman season, the Commodores staff noticed that Ogilvy was beginning to have difficulty scoring against Ezeli in practice. While obsessively studying the game and working on his basic skills, Ezeli spent his first two seasons of eligibility primarily as a backup to Ogilvy, occasionally starting, until Ogilvy declared for the NBA draft after the 2009–10 season.

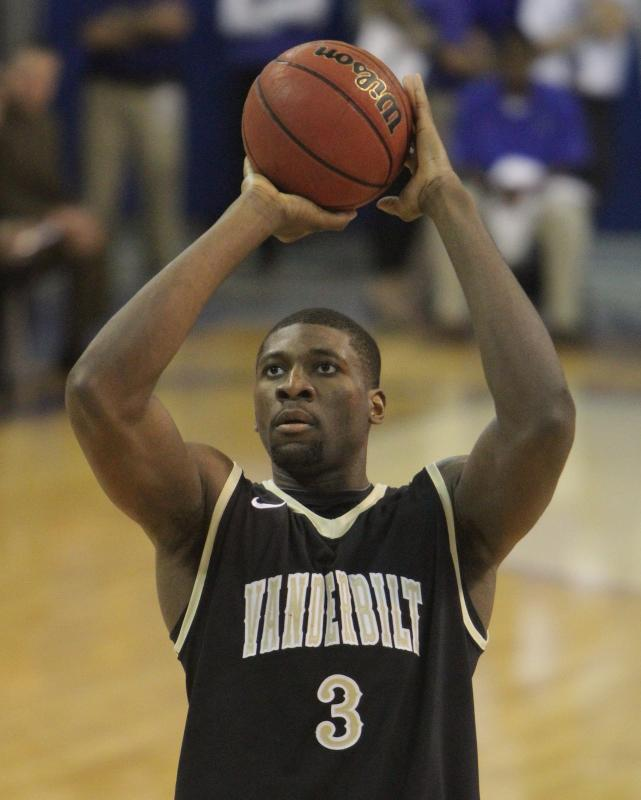
Ezeli in 2012

With Ogilvy gone, Ezeli had a breakout season in 2010–11, averaging 13 points and 6.3 rebounds while being named a second-team All-SEC (Southeastern Conference) performer. He also broke Will Perdue's Vanderbilt single-season record for blocked shots. Ezeli's improvement was noted by many in the basketball world; then-Tennessee coach Bruce Pearl told the Chattanooga Times Free Press, "I don't think they miss [Ogilvy] at all. Ezeli has improved so much that he gives them the best of both worlds [offense and defense]." Before the 2011–12 season, Ezeli was also named by Basketball Prospectus in its preseason outlook as one of the top 20 players in men's college basketball, along with teammates John Jenkins and Jeffery Taylor.

As the Commodores were preparing for Ezeli's final season at Vanderbilt, Stallings said about him:

"He now has a feel for the game. He has made himself an effective player. I think it's very rare. All of us are looking for more finished products. But we all understood if the payday came, if it really came, if he understood the game, if he was experienced, then it was going to give him a chance to be different than other guys. He didn't learn the game in elementary school like I did. He was trying to learn the game while competing effectively in the SEC. That makes it even more amazing."

== Professional career ==
=== Golden State Warriors (2012–2016) ===
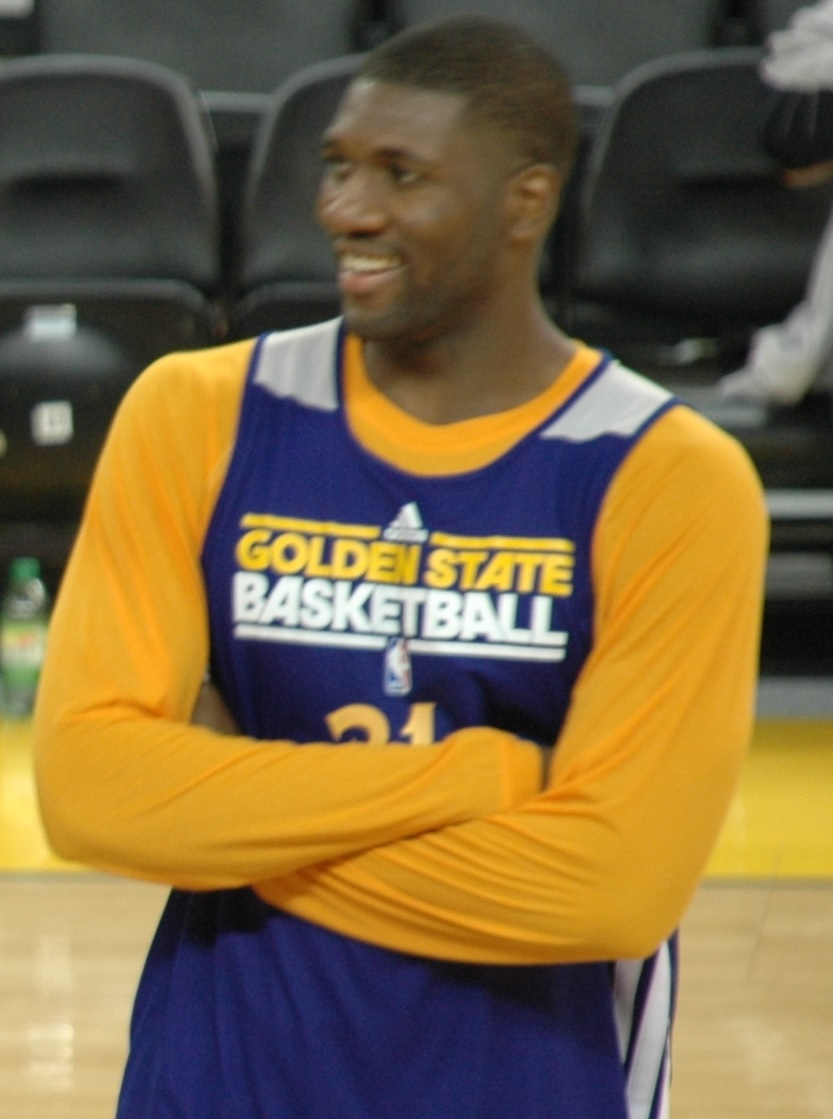
Ezeli at practice in 2012

Ezeli was selected by the Golden State Warriors with the 30th overall pick in the 2012 NBA draft. On July 6, 2012, he signed his rookie scale contract with the Warriors. As a rookie in 2012–13, Ezeli started many games for the Warriors in place of injured center Andrew Bogut. On January 19, 2013, Ezeli had a season-best game with 13 points and eight rebounds in 116–112 victory over the New Orleans Hornets.

In June 2013, Ezeli was ruled out for six to nine months after undergoing surgery on his right knee. Ezeli subsequently missed the entire 2013–14 season.

Ezeli returned to action for the Warriors in the team's 2014–15 season opener. On December 22, 2014, he scored a then-career-high 15 points in a 128–108 victory over the Sacramento Kings. The following day, Ezeli sprained his left ankle in a loss to the Los Angeles Lakers and was confined to a moon boot. The injury kept him out all of January, when on January 28, 2015, Ezeli was assigned to the Santa Cruz Warriors of the NBA Development League for rehabilitation. On February 2, he was recalled by Golden State after successfully competing in two D-League games. The following day, Ezeli made his return for Golden State, playing eight minutes of action in a 121–96 victory over the Kings. In the 2015 NBA playoffs, Ezeli logged key minutes as the first big man off the bench, often filling in for the foul-prone Andrew Bogut. The Warriors, with the help of Ezeli, advanced deep into the postseason to win the Western Conference Finals against James Harden and the Houston Rockets in five games. Ezeli won his first NBA championship after the Warriors defeated the Cleveland Cavaliers in the 2015 NBA Finals in six games.

On August 1, 2015, Ezeli played for Team Africa at the 2015 NBA Africa exhibition game. On November 6, he scored a career-high 16 points as a starter in a 119–104 victory over the Denver Nuggets. The Warriors' NBA-record start ended after 24 wins when they lost to the Milwaukee Bucks 108–95 on December 12. On February 8, 2016, Ezeli underwent successful arthroscopic surgery to clean out debris from his left knee and was subsequently ruled out for six weeks. Ezeli returned to action on April 3 against the Portland Trail Blazers after missing 31 games. Ezeli helped the Warriors win an NBA record 73 games to eclipse the 72 wins set by the 1995–96 Chicago Bulls. The Warriors made it to the 2016 NBA Finals after overcoming a 3–1 deficit against the Oklahoma City Thunder, winning the Western Conference Finals in seven games. However, the Warriors lost to the Cavaliers in seven games despite a 3–1 lead.

=== Portland Trail Blazers (2016–17) ===
On July 7, 2016, Ezeli signed with the Portland Trail Blazers. On August 23, he was ruled out for six weeks after undergoing a left knee injection. Two months later, Ezeli suffered a minor setback in his comeback from the procedure, with swelling in his knee. In mid-December, it became apparent to the Trail Blazers that conservative treatment of Ezeli's aching left knee was not working, and that season-ending surgery was imminent. On March 8, 2017, Ezeli underwent knee surgery and was ruled out for the rest of the 2016–17 season.

On June 30, 2017, Ezeli was waived by the Trail Blazers without having played a game for them.

=== Westchester Knicks (2021) ===
On March 2, 2021, Ezeli signed a contract with the Westchester Knicks of the NBA G League, returning to professional basketball after a four-year hiatus dealing with multiple injuries and difficult recoveries. He was immediately assigned the number 20 jersey. Ezeli appeared in two games.

On April 17, 2021, Ezeli signed with Rivers Hoopers to play in the inaugural season of the Basketball Africa League (BAL). However, he did not play a game for the Hoopers before getting injured and being replaced by Robinson Opong.

=== Media career ===
Following his retirement from professional basketball, Ezeli became a pregame and postgame studio analyst for Warriors games on NBC Sports Bay Area (in San Francisco) with Chris Mullin and Bonta Hill.

He later joined ESPN as a sports analyst, contributing commentary and analysis on NBA broadcasts. Ezeli also hosts Rebuilding the Beast, a podcast interviewing athletes, entrepreneurs, and public figures addressing topics including resilience, globalization in sports, and identity. In 2025, Ezeli launched Festus Feasts, a digital series promoting local restaurants and storytelling in the San Francisco Bay Area.

== Career statistics ==
Legend
GP	Games played	GS	Games started	MPG	Minutes per game
FG%	Field goal percentage	3P%	3-point field goal percentage	FT%	Free throw percentage
RPG	Rebounds per game	APG	Assists per game	SPG	Steals per game
BPG	Blocks per game	PPG	Points per game	**Bold**	Career high
†	Won an NBA championship

=== College ===
Year	Team	GP	GS	MPG	FG%	3P%	FT%	RPG	APG	SPG	BPG	PPG
2007–08	Vanderbilt	Redshirt										
2008–09	Vanderbilt	29	6	12.4	.547	–	.509	2.6	.0	.1	.8	3.8
2009–10	Vanderbilt	32	5	12.7	.544	–	.373	3.2	.1	.2	1.3	3.8
2010–11	Vanderbilt	**34**	**34**	**23.5**	**.588**	–	**.648**	**6.3**	.2	**.6**	**2.6**	**13.0**
2011–12	Vanderbilt	26	22	23.2	.539	–	.604	5.9	**.3**	.4	2.0	10.1
Career		121	67	17.9	.562	–	.584	4.5	.1	.3	1.7	7.7

=== NBA ===
==== Regular season ====
Year	Team	GP	GS	MPG	FG%	3P%	FT%	RPG	APG	SPG	BPG	PPG
2012–13	Golden State	**78**	**41**	14.4	.438	.000	.531	4.0	.3	.3	.9	2.4
2014–15†	Golden State	46	7	11.0	.547	.000	**.628**	3.4	.2	.2	.9	4.4
2015–16	Golden State	46	13	**16.7**	**.548**	.000	.530	**5.6**	**.7**	**.4**	**1.1**	**7.0**
Career		170	61	14.1	.513	.000	.557	4.3	.4	.3	1.0	4.2

==== Playoffs ====
Year	Team	GP	GS	MPG	FG%	3P%	FT%	RPG	APG	SPG	BPG	PPG
2013	Golden State	12	**3**	**11.2**	.462	.000	**.571**	2.5	.2	**.3**	**.6**	2.0
2015†	Golden State	20	0	9.2	**.540**	.000	.552	**3.1**	**.3**	.1	.5	3.5
2016	Golden State	**23**	1	8.8	.536	.000	.432	2.7	**.3**	.1	.3	**4.0**
Career		55	4	9.5	.530	.000	.500	2.8	.3	.1	.4	3.4

=== NBA D/G League ===
==== Regular season ====
Year	Team	GP	GS	MPG	FG%	3P%	FT%	RPG	APG	SPG	BPG	PPG
2014–15	Santa Cruz	**2**	0	**21.0**	**.474**	–	**1.000**	**5.0**	.0	**1.0**	**3.0**	**10.0**
2020–21	Westchester	**2**	0	4.5	.000	–	–	2.5	.0	.0	.5	.0
Career		4	0	12.8	.450	–	1.000	3.8	.0	.5	1.8	5.0

== Personal life ==
Ezeli has a half-sister, Marie Nkechi Ndulue.

Although Ezeli began his Vanderbilt studies as a biology major, he changed his major to economics because of the time demands of basketball. Vanderbilt chancellor Nicholas Zeppos said of Ezeli: "You can imagine what it's like to hear his perspective on world trade, globalization and the economics of American sports." Ezeli's parents live in Sacramento.

Ezeli became an American citizen in September 2019.
