= James Jones (basketball, born 1980) =

American basketball executive and former player (born 1980)

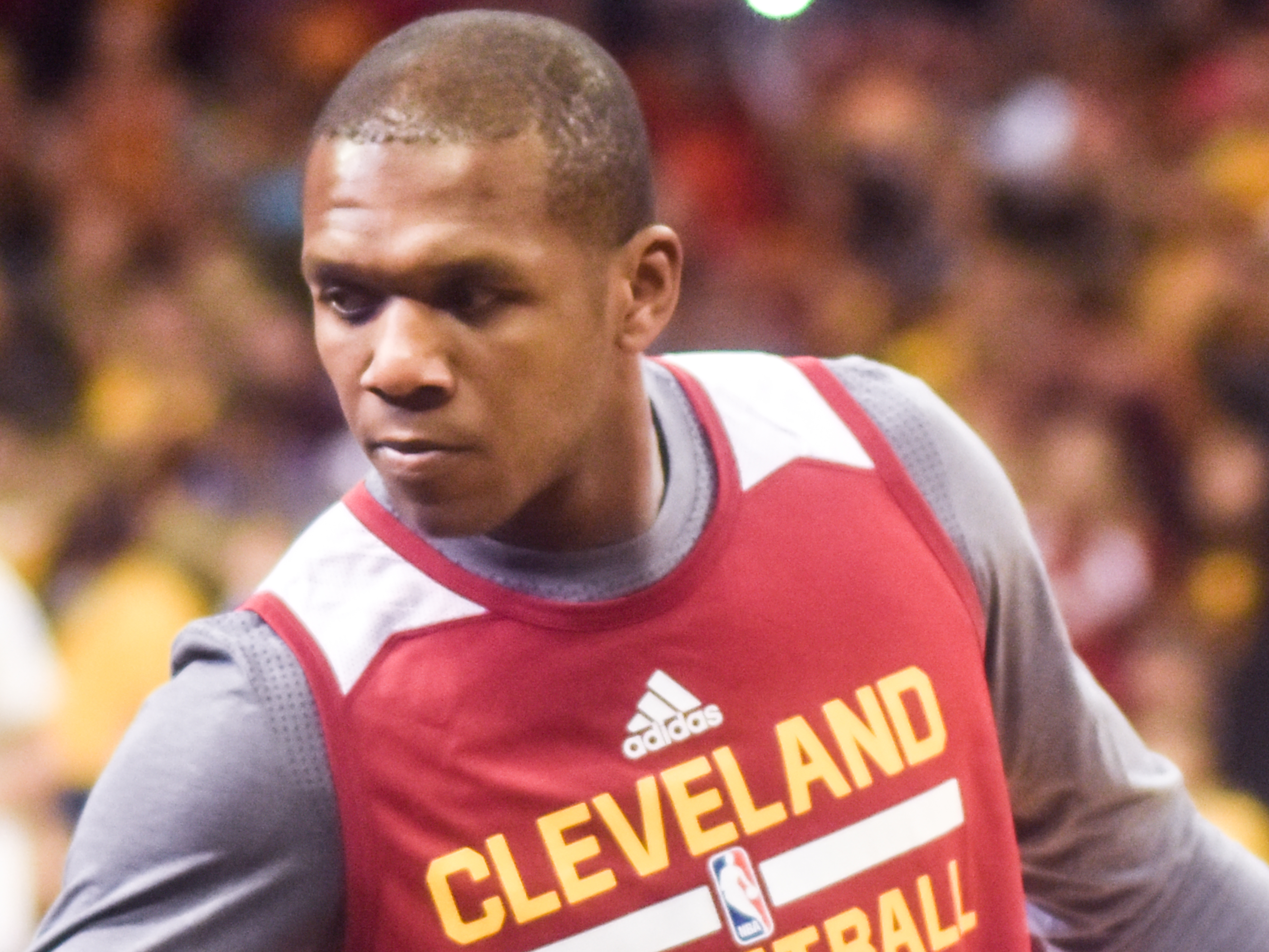
- Jones with the Cleveland Cavaliers in 2015

Personal information
- Born: October 4, 1980 (age 46) Miami, Florida, U.S.
- Listed height: 6 ft 8 in (2.03 m)
- Listed weight: 218 lb (99 kg)

Career information
- High school: American (Hialeah, Florida)
- College: Miami (Florida) (1999–2003)
- NBA draft: 2003: 2nd round, 49th overall pick
- Drafted by: Indiana Pacers
- Playing career: 2003–2017
- Position: Small forward / shooting guard
- Number: 33, 22, 1

Career history
- 2003–2005: Indiana Pacers
- 2005–2007: Phoenix Suns
- 2007–2008: Portland Trail Blazers
- 2008–2014: Miami Heat
- 2014–2017: Cleveland Cavaliers

Career highlights
- As player: 3× NBA champion (2012, 2013, 2016); NBA Three-Point Contest champion (2011); Third-team All-Big East (2002); As executive: NBA Executive of the Year (2021)

Career NBA statistics
- Points: 3,717 (5.2 ppg)
- Rebounds: 1,276 (1.8 rpg)
- Assists: 366 (0.5 apg)
- Stats at NBA.com
- Stats at Basketball Reference

James Andrew Jones (born October 4, 1980) is an American professional basketball executive and former player. He is the executive vice president, head of basketball operations for the National Basketball Association (NBA). Jones played 14 seasons in the NBA from 2003 to 2017. He was also the general manager and president of basketball operations for the Phoenix Suns.

Jones was a four-year letterman at American High School in Hialeah, Florida. He averaged 25 points per game as a senior, earning Class 6A Player of the Year and First-team All-State honors. He then played college basketball for the Miami Hurricanes, where he was a three-year starter and finished his career averaging 11 points per game. Jones was named Third-team All-Big East his junior year and Second-team Verizon Academic All-American his senior year. He was inducted into the University of Miami Sports Hall of Fame in 2014.

Jones was drafted by the Indiana Pacers in the second round of the 2003 NBA draft. He went on to play for the Pacers, Phoenix Suns, Portland Trail Blazers, Miami Heat and Cleveland Cavaliers. He won three NBA championships, two with the Heat and one with the Cavaliers. He and teammate LeBron James reached the NBA Finals for seven consecutive years from 2011 to 2017. Jones was never on an NBA team with a losing record and only missed the playoffs once—with the Trail Blazers in 2007–08. He finished third in the NBA in three-point percentage during the 2007–08 season and won the Three-Point Contest in 2011. His nickname is "Champ".

In July 2017, Jones was named the director of player personnel for the Suns. He was promoted to general manager in April 2019. After the Suns reached the playoffs for the first time since 2010, Jones was named the 2020–21 NBA Executive of the Year. He was later promoted to president of basketball operations and general manager after the team won a franchise-record 64 regular season games during the 2021–22 season.

== Early life ==
Jones was a four-year letterman in basketball at American High School in Hialeah, Florida. He averaged 25.2 points, 12 rebounds, 2.5 assists, two steals, and six blocks per game his senior season, earning First-team All-State and First-team All-Dade honors. He was also named the Class 6A Player of the Year and the Miami Herald Boys' Basketball Player of the Year. Jones was the team MVP his junior and senior years and once blocked 16 shots in one game.

== College career ==
Jones played college basketball for the Miami Hurricanes of the University of Miami from 1999 to 2003. During his time at Miami, he majored in finance, was a member of the National Honor Society, and had a 3.41 grade point average. He played in 33 games, averaging 3.9 points and 1.9 rebounds per game, during his freshman year in 1999. He started all 29 games for the Hurricanes his sophomore year, averaging 11.9 points, 5.9 rebounds, 1.2 assists, 1.2 steals and 1.6 blocks per game. Jones shot a team-best 41-of-87 on three-pointers for a .471 percentage. He started all 31 games for the team his junior season, averaging 12.8 points, 6.3 rebounds, 1.5 assists, 2.4 blocks and 1.3 steals, garnering Third-team All-Big East and 2002 Verizon Academic All-District III accolades. He started all 28 games his senior year, averaging 16.9 points, 6.0 rebounds, 1.8 assists, 1.6 steals and 1.8 blocks, earning Honorable Mention All-Big East and Second-team Verizon Academic All-American recognition. Jones led the team in blocks and rebounds as a senior.

He played in 122 games, starting 89, during college and finished his career averaging 11.1 points, 5.0 rebounds, 1.2 assists, 1.1 steals and 1.6 blocks per game. He started 89 consecutive games from the 2000–01 season to the 2002–03 season. Jones also earned Big East All-Academic honors all four seasons and was the Hurricanes' first Verizon Academic All-American selection. He was inducted into the University of Miami Sports Hall of Fame in 2014.

== Professional career ==
=== Indiana Pacers (2003–2005) ===
The 6-foot-8-inch (203 cm), 215-pound (98 kg) small forward was picked 49th by the Indiana Pacers in the 2003 NBA draft. He played in only 26 total minutes over six games during his rookie campaign in 2003–04 and missed 66 games due to a variety of injuries. He was also a DNP-CD (did not play – coach's decision) in ten games.

Jones played in 75 games, starting 24, for the Pacers during the 2004–05 season, averaging 4.9 points per game while also ranking 25th in the NBA and leading the team in three-point conversion percentage (39.8%). He saw increased playing time during the season as a result of a brawl between the Pacers and Detroit Pistons on November 19, 2004, that caused small forward Ron Artest to be suspended for the remainder of the season and shooting guard Stephen Jackson to be suspended 30 games. Jones was a DNP-CD in seven games. He scored a career-high 27 points on 10-of-14 shooting while going 6-of 9-from three-point range on November 28, 2004, against the Seattle SuperSonics.

=== Phoenix Suns (2005–2007) ===
Jones was traded by the Pacers to the Phoenix Suns on August 25, 2005, in exchange for a 2008 second-round draft pick. He played in 75 games, starting 24, for the Suns during the 2005–06 season, averaging 9.3 points, 3.4 rebounds and 23.6 minutes per game. He missed seven games due to a variety of injuries. Jones's turnover percentage of 5.23 turnovers committed per 100 plays during the 2005–06 season set an NBA record for lowest single-season turnover percentage. It was fourth place on the all-time list as of the end of the 2015–16 season. The NBA did not start recording individual turnovers until the 1977–78 season.

He appeared in 76 games, with 7 starts, for the team during the 2006–07 season, averaging 6.4 points, 2.3 rebounds and 18.1 minutes a game. He was a DNP-CD six times. Jones made 45 consecutive free throws from January 5 to March 29, the longest consecutive free throws made streak in the NBA during the 2006–07 season.

=== Portland Trail Blazers (2007–2008) ===
In June 2007, Jones was traded to the Portland Trail Blazers along with the draft rights to Rudy Fernandez, the 24th pick in the 2007 NBA draft, in exchange for cash considerations. In late January 2008, Jones was leading the NBA in three-point percentage with a percentage slightly over 50%. He missed 12 games from February 4 to 27 with a knee injury. He had also missed 12 games in November 2007 due to knee problems, spending five games on the inactive list and seven as a DNP-CD. Jones finished the 2007–08 season third in the league in three-point percentage with a percentage of 44.4%. Despite his good shooting for the year, he was not selected to participate in the Three-Point Shootout contest during the 2008 NBA All-Star Game, much to the chagrin of Trail Blazers fans. He played in 58 games, starting 3, during the season while averaging 8.0 points, 2.8 rebounds and 22.0 minutes per game. The Trail Blazers finished the 2007–08 season with a 41–41 record. That season was the only time in Jones's NBA career that he missed the playoffs. He was also never on a team with a losing record. On June 26, 2008, he used his player option to opt out of his contract with the Trail Blazers, making him a free agent for the off-season.

=== Miami Heat (2008–2014) ===
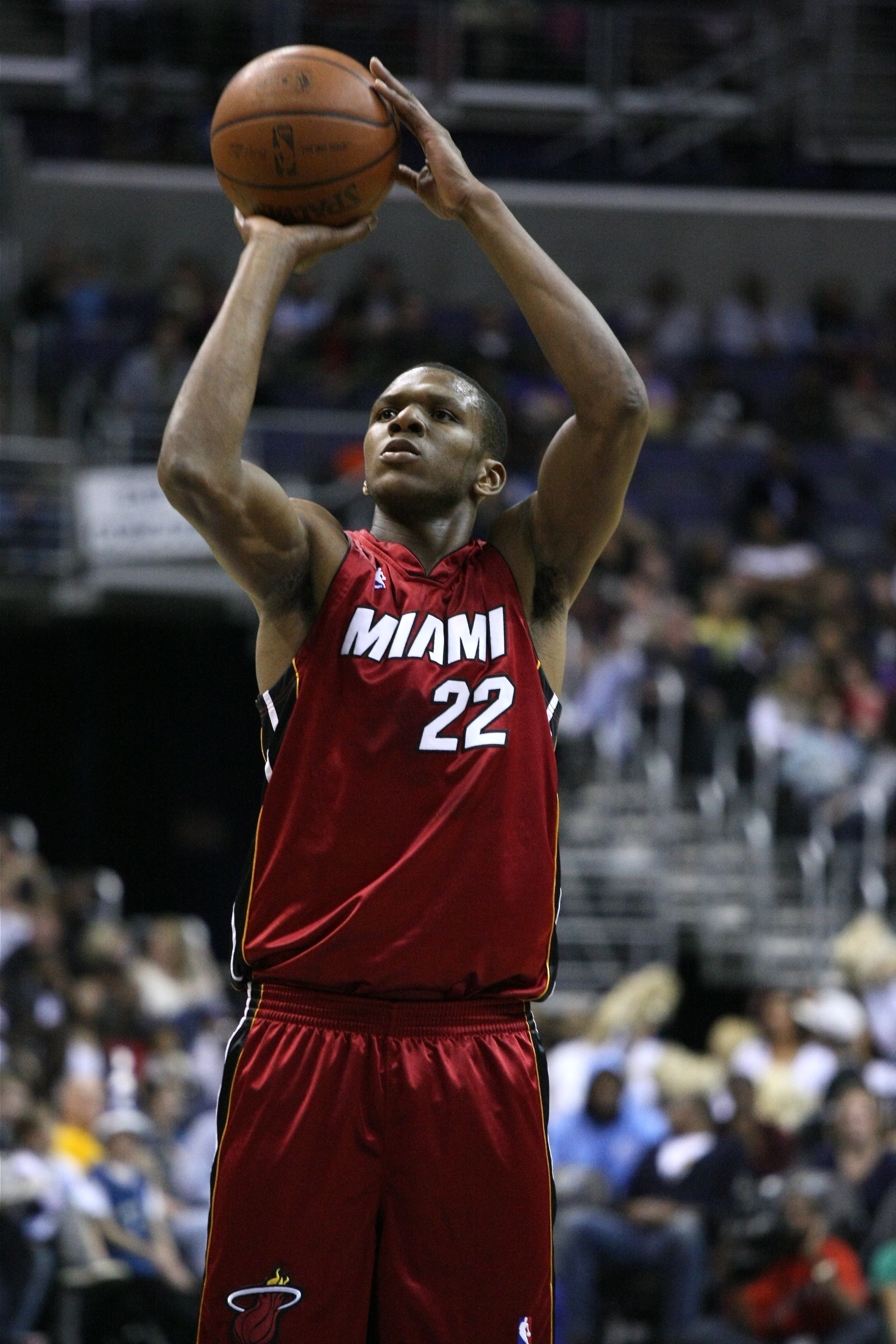
Jones with the Miami Heat in 2009

On July 9, 2008, Jones signed a contract with his hometown team, the Miami Heat. He earned $4 million in his first year of a potential five-year contract, worth up to $23.2 million. The first two years were guaranteed, while the final three were options held by both the Heat and Jones. He played in forty games, starting one, for the Heat during the 2008–09 season, averaging 4.2 points, 1.6 rebounds and 15.8 minutes per game. Jones missed 36 games due to right wrist injures and was a DNP-CD six games. He started all seven of the team's playoff games that season. He completed two four-point plays in a span of eleven seconds in a playoff loss to the Atlanta Hawks on April 29, 2009.

He appeared in 36 games, with 6 starts, for the team during the 2009–10 season while averaging 4.1 points, 1.3 rebounds and 14.0 minutes a game. He missed one game due to an intestinal virus and was a DNP-CD 35 times. Jones was also healthy but on the inactive list ten games.

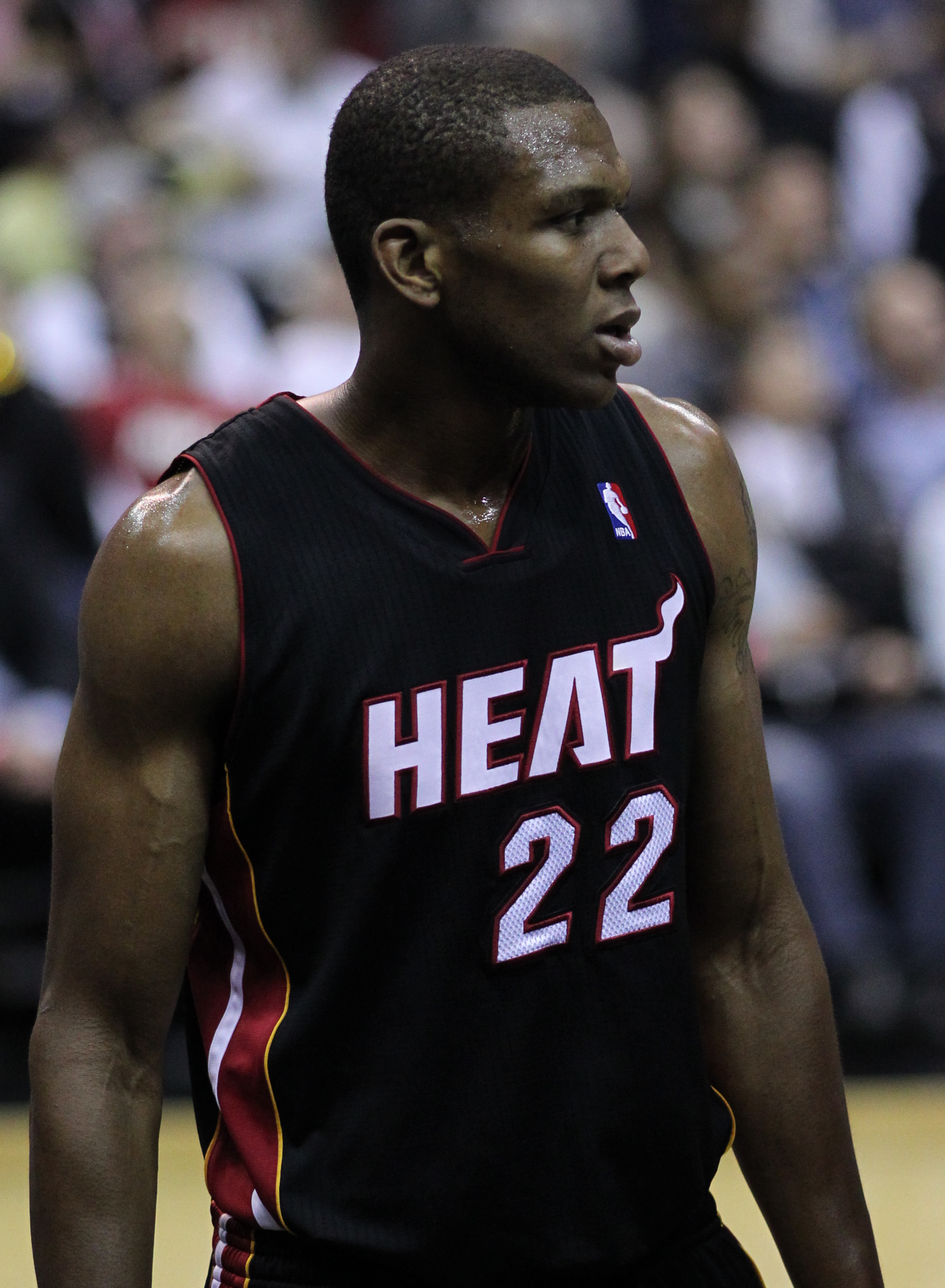
Jones with the Heat in 2011

On June 29, 2010, he was released to clear salary cap space worth $400,000. On July 19, 2010, Jones was re-signed by the Heat for the league minimum. He played in 81 games, starting 8, for the team during the 2010–11 season, averaging 5.9 points, 2.0 rebounds and 19.1 minutes per game. He missed one game as a DNP-CD. Jones led the Heat in games played, three-point field goals made with 123, three-point field goals attempted with 287 and charges drawn with 29. He finished seventh in the NBA in three-point field goal percentage with a .429 shooting percentage. He also had the lowest turnover percentage in the NBA during the 2010–11 season, committing an average of 5.27 turnovers per 100 plays. This was the second best single-season turnover percentage in NBA history, behind Jones's own record of 5.23 from the 2005–06 season. His 5.27 percentage is now fifth place while his 5.23 percentage is fourth place on the all-time list as of the end of the 2015–16 season. On February 19, 2011, he won the Three-Point Contest in Los Angeles at Staples Center. Jones scored a playoff career-high 25 points on 5-of-7 shooting from three-point range and 10-of-10 free throw shooting on May 1, 2011, against the Boston Celtics. The Heat went on to make the 2011 NBA Finals where they lost to the Dallas Mavericks, 4 games to 2.

On December 9, 2011, he re-signed with the Heat to a three-year, $4.5 million contract. In the 2011–12 season, an impressive playoff run by the Heat culminated in his first NBA championship, and the franchise's second as they defeated the Oklahoma City Thunder in the 2012 NBA Finals, 4 games to 1. Jones played in 51 games, starting 10, for the Heat during the season while averaging 3.6 points, 1.0 rebounds and 13.1 minutes per game. He was a DNP-CD 15 times. He finished third place in the 2012 Three-Point Shootout in Orlando.

Jones played in 38 games for the Heat during the 2012–13 season while averaging 1.6 points, 0.6 rebounds and 5.8 minutes. He was a DNP-CD for 43 games and missed another game for personal reasons. He won his second championship when the Heat defeated the San Antonio Spurs in seven games. In 2013–14, the Heat made the 2014 NBA Finals as they recorded their fourth straight Finals appearance. Miami faced the Spurs again but this time, the Heat went on to lose in five games. Jones played in 20 games, starting 6, during the season, averaging 4.9 points, 1.2 rebounds and 11.8 minutes. He was on the inactive list for 21 games.

=== Cleveland Cavaliers (2014–2017) ===
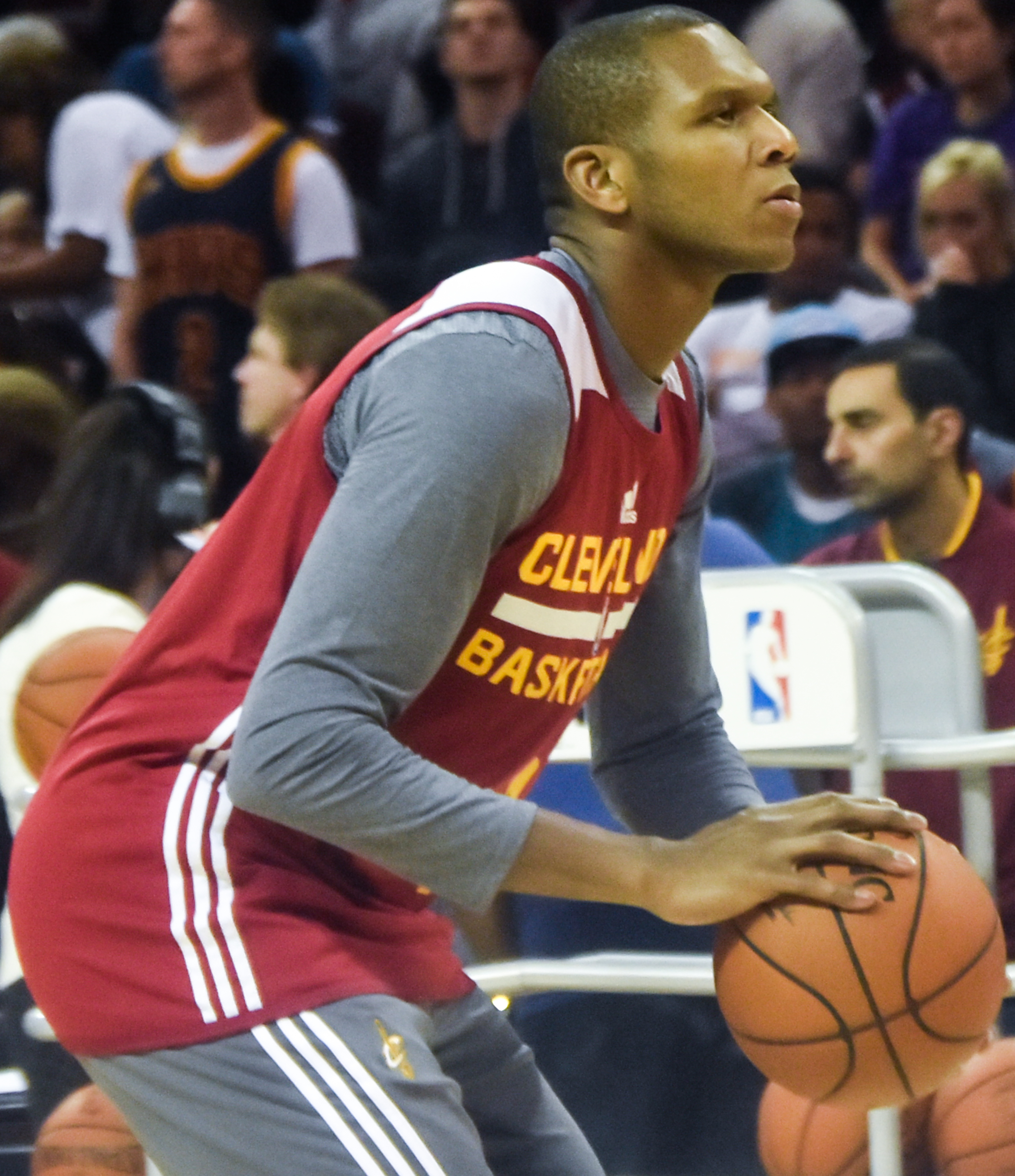
Jones with the Cavaliers in 2015

On August 5, 2014, Jones signed with the Cleveland Cavaliers. LeBron James, Jones's teammate with the Heat, had asked him to come join him in Cleveland. The Cavaliers won the Eastern Conference championship and advanced to the NBA Finals. Facing the Golden State Warriors, the Cavaliers lost the series in six games. Jones played in 57 games, starting 2, for the Cavaliers during the 2014–15 season while averaging 4.4 points, 1.1 rebounds and 11.7 minutes a game. He was a DNP-CD for 25 games.

On July 25, 2015, Jones re-signed with the Cavaliers. In a December 2015 article on ESPN.com by Dave McMenamin, LeBron James said "He's my favorite player of all time" and "He's the greatest teammate I've ever had" in regards to Jones. The Cavaliers won the Eastern Conference championship for the second year in a row and went on to win the 2016 NBA championship, becoming the first team in history to win the championship after being down 3–1 in the Finals, as Jones won his third title in five years. He played in 48 games during the 2015–16 season while averaging 3.7 points, 1.0 rebounds and 9.6 minutes a game. He was a DNP-CD for 34 games. He was also one of twelve players nominated for the Twyman–Stokes Teammate of the Year Award, finishing tenth place in the voting. On June 26, 2016, Cavaliers teammate Kevin Love called Jones "the best teammate I've ever had".

On August 3, 2016, Jones re-signed with the Cavaliers. On January 19, 2017, he started in place of an injured Kevin Love and scored 14 points in a 118–103 win over the Phoenix Suns. It was his first start since April 2, 2015. The Cavaliers won the Eastern Conference championship for the third year in a row, as Jones and teammate LeBron James joined Bill Russell, Bob Cousy, K. C. Jones, Sam Jones, Tom Heinsohn, and Frank Ramsey (all from the Boston Celtics) as the only players in NBA history to reach seven consecutive NBA Finals. Facing the Golden State Warriors in the Finals for the third straight year, the Cavaliers lost the series in five games. Jones played in 48 games, starting 2, for the Cavaliers during the 2016–17 season while averaging 2.8 points, 0.8 rebounds and 7.9 minutes a game.

== Executive career ==
On July 19, 2017, Jones was named the director of player personnel for the Phoenix Suns, effectively ending his 14-year NBA career. On October 8, 2018, Jones was named an interim general manager for the Suns alongside assistant general manager Trevor Bukstein after the previous general manager, Ryan McDonough, was fired. During the 2018–19 season, he worked with Bukstein on two trades for the Suns: trading Trevor Ariza for Kelly Oubre Jr. and Austin Rivers in December 2018 and Ryan Anderson for Tyler Johnson and Wayne Ellington in February 2019. On April 11, 2019, the Suns removed the interim tag from Jones' title, naming him the team's general manager, with Bukstein remaining as assistant general manager.

During the 2019 off-season, Jones orchestrated changes that appeared questionable on the surface, such as firing head coach Igor Kokoškov after only one season (albeit hiring Monty Williams soon afterward), executing multiple trades in the 2019 NBA draft, including T. J. Warren to the Indiana Pacers for cash considerations, trading down from the 6th pick to pick up both Dario Šarić and the 11th draft pick (Cameron Johnson) from the Minnesota Timberwolves, and trading a late 2020 first-round pick to the Boston Celtics for Aron Baynes and the 24th pick (Ty Jerome), and even picking up Ricky Rubio in free agency via trading multiple picks and players with the Memphis Grizzlies to free up more salary. Despite the mixed reception, Jones' moves would help the Suns achieve their best record in five seasons, before the COVID-19 pandemic hit U.S. shores in 2020, with a 26–39 record before the season was suspended. When the season resumed in the 2020 NBA Bubble, the Suns managed to finish with an 8–0 run in Orlando, with their only significant roster change adding G League guard Cameron Payne.

With the surprising improvement in the bubble, Jones orchestrated another major trade in November 2020, this time trading Kelly Oubre Jr., Ricky Rubio, Ty Jerome, Jalen Lecque, and a protected 2022 first-round pick to the Oklahoma City Thunder for Abdel Nader and All-Star point guard Chris Paul. Jones looked to bolster team depth in the delayed 2020 NBA draft period by selecting Jalen Smith at pick 10 and picking up Jae Crowder, E'Twaun Moore, Langston Galloway, and Damian Jones in the shortened 2020 free agency period in the hopes of ending their decade-long playoff drought. The Suns later made the 2021 NBA playoffs; the team's first postseason appearance since 2010. Because of the Suns' dramatic improvement, Jones earned the 2020–21 NBA Executive of the Year Award. The Suns reached the 2021 NBA Finals, but lost the series in six games to the Milwaukee Bucks.

The Suns won a franchise-record 64 regular season games during the 2021–22 season. Jones was promoted from general manager to president of basketball operations and general manager on November 28, 2022. The Suns finished with a 36–46 record in 2024–25, their first losing season since 2019–20. Afterwards Brian Gregory was named the team's new general manager and Jones was demoted to senior advisor. On July 9, 2025, Jones left the Suns to become the NBA's executive vice president, head of basketball operations.

== Personal life ==
Jones is a Christian. He and his wife Destiny have a son named James Dylan Jones and two daughters named Jadynn Alyssa Jones and Jodie Marissa Jones. Jones's nicknames include "Champ", "J. J." and "JHoops" (pronounced Joops). The James Jones Legacy Foundation was founded in 2009. He is also a managing partner of the consulting firm Jones and Jones Strategic Consulting. Jones previously owned an urban redevelopment company called James Jones Ventures. He began hosting an annual basketball camp called JHoops Live in 2009. He also runs a camp called Crew 22 Training Camp. Jones appeared on the television show Kitchen Nightmares in 2010.

Jones's uncle, Ricky Gutiérrez, played in Major League Baseball. Jones's aunt, Lisa Jones played basketball at the University of Miami from 1988 to 1990. His cousin Mionsha Gay also played at the University of Miami. His aunt, Hope Jones, and his cousin, Shelnita Jackson, played basketball at Barry University. Jones's father Jay Lee played at Southern University while his uncle Mitchell Lee played at the University of Minnesota and his cousin Shawn Brailsford played at Marshall University.

Jones was previously the secretary-treasurer of the NBA Players Association (NBPA).

== Awards and honors ==
As player

- 3× NBA champion – 2011–12, 2012–13, 2015–16
- NBA Three-Point Contest champion – 2010–11
- All-Big East Conference Third-team – 2001–02
- 4× Big East All-Academic Team – 1999–2000, 2000–01, 2001–02, 2002–03
- Honorable Mention All-Big East Conference Team – 2002–03
- Verizon Academic All-American – 2002–03
- Verizon Academic All-District III selection – 2001–02
- Inducted into University of Miami Sports Hall of Fame – 2014
- Class 6A Player of the Year in Florida – 1998–99
- First-team All-State Selection – 1998–99
- First-team All-Dade County selection – 1998–99
- Miami Herald Boys' Basketball Player of the Year – 1998–99

As executive

- 2020–21 NBA Executive of the Year

== NBA career statistics ==
Legend
| GP | Games played | GS | Games started | MPG | Minutes per game |
| FG% | Field goal percentage | 3P% | 3-point field goal percentage | FT% | Free throw percentage |
| RPG | Rebounds per game | APG | Assists per game | SPG | Steals per game |
| BPG | Blocks per game | PPG | Points per game | **Bold** | Career high |
| † | Won an NBA championship |

=== Regular season ===
| Year | Team | GP | GS | MPG | FG% | 3P% | FT% | RPG | APG | SPG | BPG | PPG |
|---|---|---|---|---|---|---|---|---|---|---|---|---|
| 2003–04 | Indiana | 6 | 0 | 4.3 | .222 | .250 | **1.000** | .3 | .0 | .2 | .0 | 1.2 |
| 2004–05 | Indiana | 75 | **24** | 17.7 | .396 | .398 | .855 | 2.3 | **.8** | .4 | .4 | 4.9 |
| 2005–06 | Phoenix | 75 | **24** | **23.6** | .418 | .386 | .851 | **3.4** | **.8** | **.5** | **.7** | **9.3** |
| 2006–07 | Phoenix | 76 | 7 | 18.1 | .368 | .378 | .877 | 2.3 | .6 | .4 | .6 | 6.4 |
| 2007–08 | Portland | 58 | 3 | 22.0 | .437 | .444 | .878 | 2.8 | .6 | .4 | .3 | 8.0 |
| 2008–09 | Miami | 40 | 1 | 15.8 | .369 | .344 | .839 | 1.6 | .5 | .3 | .4 | 4.2 |
| 2009–10 | Miami | 36 | 6 | 14.0 | .361 | .411 | .821 | 1.3 | .5 | .3 | .1 | 4.1 |
| 2010–11 | Miami | **81** | 8 | 19.1 | .422 | .429 | .833 | 2.0 | .5 | .4 | .2 | 5.9 |
| 2011–12† | Miami | 51 | 10 | 13.1 | .380 | .404 | .833 | 1.0 | .4 | .3 | .2 | 3.6 |
| 2012–13† | Miami | 38 | 0 | 5.8 | .344 | .302 | .500 | .6 | .3 | .1 | .2 | 1.6 |
| 2013–14 | Miami | 20 | 6 | 11.8 | **.456** | **.519** | .636 | 1.2 | .5 | .2 | .2 | 4.9 |
| 2014–15 | Cleveland | 57 | 2 | 11.7 | .368 | .360 | .848 | 1.1 | .4 | .2 | .1 | 4.4 |
| 2015–16† | Cleveland | 48 | 0 | 9.6 | .408 | .394 | .808 | 1.0 | .3 | .2 | .2 | 3.7 |
| 2016–17 | Cleveland | 48 | 2 | 7.9 | .478 | .470 | .650 | .8 | .3 | .1 | .2 | 2.8 |
| Career | | 709 | 93 | 15.7 | .401 | .401 | .840 | 1.8 | 0.5 | 0.3 | 0.3 | 5.2 |

=== Playoffs ===
| Year | Team | GP | GS | MPG | FG% | 3P% | FT% | RPG | APG | SPG | BPG | PPG |
|---|---|---|---|---|---|---|---|---|---|---|---|---|
| 2005 | Indiana | 13 | 0 | 16.5 | .413 | .400 | .444 | 2.1 | **.8** | **.5** | .5 | 4.0 |
| 2006 | Phoenix | **20** | 6 | 17.7 | .341 | .308 | .846 | **3.6** | .3 | .3 | **.9** | 4.3 |
| 2007 | Phoenix | 11 | 6 | 15.5 | .528 | .444 | .818 | 1.4 | .3 | .2 | .2 | 5.0 |
| 2009 | Miami | 7 | **7** | **33.6** | **.531** | .500 | .917 | 2.3 | .7 | .4 | .1 | **9.6** |
| 2010 | Miami | 1 | 0 | 9.0 | .000 | .000 | **1.000** | .0 | .0 | .0 | .0 | 2.0 |
| 2011 | Miami | 12 | 0 | 22.7 | .471 | .459 | **1.000** | 2.5 | .2 | **.5** | .2 | 6.5 |
| 2012† | Miami | **20** | 0 | 8.7 | .372 | .300 | **1.000** | 1.0 | .1 | .2 | .1 | 2.6 |
| 2013† | Miami | 9 | 0 | 3.7 | .429 | **.750** | — | .3 | .0 | .0 | .1 | 1.0 |
| 2014 | Miami | 15 | 0 | 8.4 | .450 | .469 | .667 | .7 | .3 | .2 | .1 | 3.5 |
| 2015 | Cleveland | **20** | 0 | 15.6 | .347 | .344 | .929 | 1.5 | .5 | .4 | .2 | 4.4 |
| 2016† | Cleveland | 12 | 0 | 4.6 | .200 | .143 | .250 | .3 | .3 | .0 | .0 | .5 |
| 2017 | Cleveland | 8 | 0 | 3.7 | .200 | .000 | — | .5 | .0 | .0 | .0 | .3 |
| Career | | 148 | 19 | 13.4 | .404 | .387 | .845 | 1.6 | .3 | .3 | .3 | 3.7 |

== See also ==
- List of National Basketball Association career 3-point field goal percentage leaders
