= 2016–17 Cleveland Cavaliers season =

NBA professional basketball team season

- Conference champions
- Division champions
- Head coach: Tyronn Lue
- General manager: David Griffin
- Owner: Dan Gilbert
- Arena: Quicken Loans Arena

Results
- Record: 51–31 (.622)
- Place: Division: 1st (Central); Conference: 2nd (Eastern)
- Playoff finish: NBA Finals (lost to Warriors 1–4)
- Stats at Basketball Reference

Local media
- Television: Fox Sports Ohio
- Radio: WTAM; WMMS

The 2016–17 Cleveland Cavaliers season was the 47th season of the franchise in the National Basketball Association (NBA). For the first time in franchise history, the Cavaliers entered the season as the defending NBA champions, having defeated the Golden State Warriors in seven games in the NBA Finals where they came back from a 3–1 deficit, becoming the first team in NBA Finals history to do so. The Cavaliers also broke the record of most made three-pointers in a regular season game with 25 against the Atlanta Hawks.

The Cavaliers finished the regular season with a 51–31 record, securing the second seed. In the playoffs, the Cavaliers defeated and swept the Indiana Pacers in four games in the First Round, advancing to the Semi-finals. They then defeated and swept the Toronto Raptors in four games, advancing to the Eastern Conference finals. They defeated the top-seeded Boston Celtics in five games to advance to the NBA Finals for the third straight season. In the 2017 NBA Finals, the Cavaliers faced off against the Golden State Warriors for the third consecutive year, becoming the first two teams to meet three consecutive times in the NBA Finals. The Cavaliers would lose in five games against the Warriors in the NBA Finals.

After the season, David Griffin left as general manager and after hearing about trade rumors, most notably a 3-team deal that was confirmed by team and league sources that would've sent Paul George and Eric Bledsoe to the Cavaliers and Kyrie Irving and Channing Frye to the Phoenix Suns, Irving, not being content about the situation and per his request, was traded to the Boston Celtics for Jae Crowder, Isaiah Thomas, Ante Žižić, a 2018 1st-round draft pick (Collin Sexton was later selected), and a 2020 2nd-round draft pick (Skylar Mays was later selected) was added as compensation for Isaiah Thomas's injury. This trade ended the superteam era of the Cavaliers.

== Offseason ==
=== Draft ===
Round	Pick	Player	Position	Nationality	College / Club
2	54*	Kay Felder (Note: The Cavaliers did not have a pick walking in to the 2016 NBA Draft. Cleveland traded for the rights of PG Kay Felder, who the Atlanta Hawks selected with the 54th pick in the 2nd round, in exchange for cash considerations.)	PG	United States	Oakland

== Roster ==
2016–17 Cleveland Cavaliers roster
Players

Pos.	No.	Player	Height	Weight	DOB	From
G	20	Kay Felder	5 ft 9 in (1.75 m)	176 lb (80 kg)	1995–03–29	Oakland
F	8	Channing Frye	6 ft 11 in (2.11 m)	255 lb (116 kg)	1983–05–17	Arizona
G	2	Kyrie Irving	6 ft 2 in (1.88 m)	193 lb (88 kg)	1992–03–23	Duke
F	23	LeBron James	6 ft 8 in (2.03 m)	250 lb (113 kg)	1984–12–30	St. Vincent-St. Mary HS (OH)
F	24	Richard Jefferson	6 ft 7 in (2.01 m)	233 lb (106 kg)	1980–06–21	Arizona
G	30	Dahntay Jones	6 ft 6 in (1.98 m)	225 lb (102 kg)	1980–12–27	Duke
F	1	James Jones	6 ft 8 in (2.03 m)	218 lb (99 kg)	1980–10–04	Miami (FL)
F	26	Kyle Korver	6 ft 7 in (2.01 m)	212 lb (96 kg)	1981–03–17	Creighton
F	0	Kevin Love	6 ft 10 in (2.08 m)	251 lb (114 kg)	1988–09–07	UCLA
G	4	Iman Shumpert	6 ft 5 in (1.96 m)	220 lb (100 kg)	1990–06–26	Georgia Tech
G	5	J. R. Smith	6 ft 6 in (1.98 m)	225 lb (102 kg)	1985–09–09	Saint Benedict's Preparatory (NJ)
C	40	Walter Tavares	7 ft 3 in (2.21 m)	265 lb (120 kg)	1992–03–22	Cape Verde
F/C	13	Tristan Thompson	6 ft 10 in (2.08 m)	240 lb (109 kg)	1991–03–13	Texas
G	31	Deron Williams	6 ft 3 in (1.91 m)	200 lb (91 kg)	1984–06–26	Illinois
F	3	Derrick Williams	6 ft 8 in (2.03 m)	240 lb (109 kg)	1991–05–25	Arizona

Coaches
Head coach
- Tyronn Lue
Assistant(s)
- Jim Boylan
- Larry Drew
- Damon Jones
- Mike Longabardi
- James Posey
- Phil Handy
- Vitaly Potapenko

Legend
- (DP) Unsigned draft pick
- (FA) Free agent
- (S) Suspended
- (DL) On assignment to D-League affiliate
- Injured

Roster
Updated: 2017–05–08

== Standings ==
=== Division ===
Central Division	W	L	PCT	GB	Home	Road	Div	GP
y – Cleveland Cavaliers	51	31	.622	–	31‍–‍10	20‍–‍21	8–8	82
x – Milwaukee Bucks	42	40	.512	9.0	23‍–‍18	19‍–‍22	10–6	82
x – Indiana Pacers	42	40	.512	9.0	29‍–‍12	13‍–‍28	8–8	82
x – Chicago Bulls	41	41	.500	10.0	25‍–‍16	16‍–‍25	9–7	82
Detroit Pistons	37	45	.451	14.0	24‍–‍17	13‍–‍28	5–11	82

=== Conference ===
Eastern Conference
#	Team	W	L	PCT	GB	GP
1	c – Boston Celtics *	53	29	.646	–	82
2	y – Cleveland Cavaliers *	51	31	.622	2.0	82
3	x – Toronto Raptors	51	31	.622	2.0	82
4	y – Washington Wizards *	49	33	.598	4.0	82
5	x – Atlanta Hawks	43	39	.524	10.0	82
6	x – Milwaukee Bucks	42	40	.512	11.0	82
7	x – Indiana Pacers	42	40	.512	11.0	82
8	x – Chicago Bulls	41	41	.500	12.0	82
9	Miami Heat	41	41	.500	12.0	82
10	Detroit Pistons	37	45	.451	16.0	82
11	Charlotte Hornets	36	46	.439	17.0	82
12	New York Knicks	31	51	.378	22.0	82
13	Orlando Magic	29	53	.354	24.0	82
14	Philadelphia 76ers	28	54	.341	25.0	82
15	Brooklyn Nets	20	62	.244	33.0	82

== Game log ==
=== Preseason ===
2016 pre-season game log
Total: 2–4 (home: 2–2; road: 0–2)
Pre-season: 2–4 (home: 2–2; road: 0–2)

Game	Date	Team	Score	High points	High rebounds	High assists	Location Attendance	Record
1	October 5	Orlando	117–102	Jordan McRae (20)	Cory Jefferson (11)	LeBron James (6)	Quicken Loans Arena; 18,789	1–0
2	October 8	Philadelphia	108–105	Jordan McRae (20)	Chris Andersen (6)	Chris Andersen, Jordan McRae (4)	Quicken Loans Arena; 19,694	2–0
3	October 10	@ Atlanta	93–99	Felder, Holmes (15)	Cory Jefferson (11)	Kay Felder (6)	Philips Arena; 16,202	2–1
4	October 13	Toronto	94–119	Kevin Love (19)	Liggins, Love (5)	Kyrie Irving (8)	Quicken Loans Arena; 18,834	2–2
5	October 14	@ Chicago	108–118	John Holland (23)	Jonathan Holmes (6)	Kay Felder (7)	United Center; 21,766	2–3
6	October 18	Washington	91–96	LeBron James (18)	Tristan Thompson (10)	Iman Shumpert (5)	Value City Arena; 18,104	2–4

2016–17 season schedule

=== Regular season ===
2016–17 game log
Total: 51–31 (home: 31–10; road: 20–21)
October: 3–0 (home: 2–0; road: 1–0)

Game	Date	Team	Score	High points	High rebounds	High assists	Location Attendance	Record
1	October 25	New York	117–88	Kyrie Irving (29)	Kevin Love (12)	LeBron James (14)	Quicken Loans Arena; 20,562	1–0
2	October 28	@ Toronto	94–91	Kyrie Irving (26)	Love, Thompson (10)	LeBron James (7)	Air Canada Centre; 19,800	2–0
3	October 29	Orlando	105–99	LeBron James (23)	Tristan Thompson (12)	LeBron James (9)	Quicken Loans Arena; 20,562	3–0

November: 10–3 (home: 7–1; road: 3–2)

Game	Date	Team	Score	High points	High rebounds	High assists	Location Attendance	Record
4	November 1 (Note: The start time for the November 1st home game against the Houston Rockets was moved to 6 pm EST, to accommodate Game 6 of the MLB World Series at Progressive Field across the street from Quicken Loans Arena, between the Indians and the Chicago Cubs.)	Houston	128–120	Kyrie Irving (32)	LeBron James (13)	LeBron James (8)	Quicken Loans Arena; 20,562	4–0
5	November 3	Boston	128–122	LeBron James (30)	Tristan Thompson (14)	LeBron James (12)	Quicken Loans Arena; 20,562	5–0
6	November 5	@ Philadelphia	102–101	LeBron James (25)	Tristan Thompson (13)	LeBron James (14)	Wells Fargo Center; 20,497	6–0
7	November 8	Atlanta	106–110	Kyrie Irving (29)	Kevin Love (12)	LeBron James (5)	Quicken Loans Arena; 20,562	6–1
8	November 11	@ Washington	105–94	Kyrie Irving (29)	Kevin Love (16)	Kyrie Irving (6)	Verizon Center; 20,356	7–1
9	November 13	Charlotte	100–93	Channing Frye (20)	Tristan Thompson (12)	LeBron James (8)	Quicken Loans Arena; 20,562	8–1
10	November 15	Toronto	121–117	LeBron James (28)	Kevin Love (13)	LeBron James (14)	Quicken Loans Arena; 20,562	9–1
11	November 16	@ Indiana	93–103	Kevin Love (27)	Kevin Love (16)	Kyrie Irving (7)	Bankers Life Fieldhouse; 17,923	9–2
12	November 18	Detroit	104–81	Kyrie Irving (25)	Tristan Thompson (14)	Kyrie Irving (11)	Quicken Loans Arena; 20,562	10–2
13	November 23	Portland	137–125	Kevin Love (40)	LeBron James (10)	LeBron James (13)	Quicken Loans Arena; 20,562	11–2
14	November 25	Dallas	128–90	Kevin Love (27)	Tristan Thompson (12)	LeBron James (11)	Quicken Loans Arena; 20,562	12–2
15	November 27	@ Philadelphia	112–108	Kyrie Irving (39)	Tristan Thompson (12)	LeBron James (13)	Wells Fargo Center; 20,497	13–2
16	November 29	@ Milwaukee	101–118	LeBron James (22)	Kevin Love (13)	LeBron James (4)	Bradley Center; 18,717	13–3

December: 12–4 (home: 8–1; road: 4–3)

Game	Date	Team	Score	High points	High rebounds	High assists	Location Attendance	Record
17	December 1	L.A. Clippers	94–113	Kyrie Irving (28)	Tristan Thompson (8)	LeBron James (5)	Quicken Loans Arena; 20,562	13–4
18	December 2	@ Chicago	105–111	LeBron James (27)	Kevin Love (19)	LeBron James (13)	United Center; 21,775	13–5
19	December 5	@ Toronto	116–112	LeBron James (34)	Love, Thompson (14)	LeBron James (7)	Air Canada Centre; 19,800	14–5
20	December 7	@ New York	126–94	Kyrie Irving (28)	Tristan Thompson (20)	LeBron James (7)	Madison Square Garden; 19,812	15–5
21	December 9	Miami	114–84	Kevin Love (28)	Kevin Love (15)	LeBron James (8)	Quicken Loans Arena; 20,562	16–5
22	December 10	Charlotte	116–105	LeBron James (44)	Tristan Thompson (12)	LeBron James (10)	Quicken Loans Arena; 20,562	17–5
23	December 13	Memphis	103–86	Kevin Love (29)	Kevin Love (13)	LeBron James (8)	Quicken Loans Arena; 20,562	18–5
24	December 14	@ Memphis	85–93	James Jones (15)	Tristan Thompson (11)	Kay Felder (4)	FedEx Forum; 17,449	18–6
25	December 17	L.A. Lakers	119–108	Kevin Love (24)	Kevin Love (17)	Kyrie Irving (12)	Quicken Loans Arena; 20,562	19–6
26	December 20	@ Milwaukee	114–108 (OT)	LeBron James (34)	James, Thompson (12)	LeBron James (7)	BMO Harris Bradley Center; 17,053	20–6
27	December 21	Milwaukee	113–102	Kyrie Irving (31)	Tristan Thompson (15)	Kyrie Irving (13)	Quicken Loans Arena; 20,562	21–6
28	December 23	Brooklyn	119–99	LeBron James (19)	Kevin Love (15)	LeBron James (10)	Quicken Loans Arena; 20,562	22–6
29	December 25	Golden State	109–108	LeBron James (31)	LeBron James (13)	Kyrie Irving (10)	Quicken Loans Arena; 20,562	23–6
30	December 26	@ Detroit	90–106	Kyrie Irving (18)	Kevin Love (14)	Kyrie Irving (8)	The Palace of Auburn Hills; 18,123	23–7
31	December 29	Boston	124–118	Kyrie Irving (32)	Kevin Love (15)	Kyrie Irving (12)	Quicken Loans Arena; 20,562	24–7
32	December 31	@ Charlotte	121–109	LeBron James (32)	Kevin Love (10)	LeBron James (9)	Spectrum Center; 19,519	25–7

January: 7–8 (home: 4–3; road: 3–5)

Game	Date	Team	Score	High points	High rebounds	High assists	Location Attendance	Record
33	January 2	New Orleans	90–82	LeBron James (26)	Richard Jefferson (12)	LeBron James (6)	Quicken Loans Arena; 20,562	26–7
34	January 4	Chicago	94–106	LeBron James (31)	Tristan Thompson (11)	LeBron James (7)	Quicken Loans Arena; 20,562	26–8
35	January 6	@ Brooklyn	116–108	LeBron James (36)	Kevin Love (13)	LeBron James (6)	Barclays Center; 17,732	27–8
36	January 8	@ Phoenix	120–116	LeBron James (28)	Love, Thompson (10)	Kyrie Irving (7)	Talking Stick Resort Arena; 18,055	28–8
37	January 10	@ Utah	92–100	LeBron James (29)	Tristan Thompson (12)	LeBron James (5)	Vivint Smart Home Arena; 19,911	28–9
38	January 11	@ Portland	86–102	LeBron James (20)	LeBron James (11)	LeBron James (4)	Moda Center; 17,212	28–10
39	January 13	@ Sacramento	120–108	Kyrie Irving (26)	Kevin Love (18)	LeBron James (15)	Golden 1 Center; 17,156	29–10
40	January 16	@ Golden State	91–126	LeBron James (20)	LeBron James (8)	Kay Felder (3)	Oracle Arena; 19,596	29–11
41	January 19	Phoenix	118–103	Kyrie Irving (26)	LeBron James (9)	LeBron James (15)	Quicken Loans Arena; 20,562	30–11
42	January 21	San Antonio	115–118	James, Irving (29)	Tristan Thompson (12)	Kyrie Irving (9)	Quicken Loans Arena; 20,562	30–12
43	January 23	@ New Orleans	122–124	Kyrie Irving (49)	Kevin Love (16)	LeBron James (12)	Smoothie King Center; 17,758	30–13
44	January 25	Sacramento	112–116 (OT)	LeBron James (24)	Kevin Love (16)	LeBron James (11)	Quicken Loans Arena; 20,562	30–14
45	January 27	Brooklyn	124–116	LeBron James (31)	Kevin Love (14)	LeBron James (11)	Quicken Loans Arena; 20,562	31–14
46	January 29	Oklahoma City	107–91	Kyrie Irving (29)	LeBron James (14)	Kyrie Irving (10)	Quicken Loans Arena; 20,562	32–14
47	January 30	@ Dallas	97–104	LeBron James (23)	LeBron James (9)	LeBron James (9)	American Airlines Center; 20,202	32–15

February: 9–2 (home: 5–1; road: 4–1)

Game	Date	Team	Score	High points	High rebounds	High assists	Location Attendance	Record
48	February 1	Minnesota	125–97	LeBron James (27)	Tristan Thompson (14)	Kyrie Irving (14)	Quicken Loans Arena; 20,562	33–15
49	February 4	@ New York	111–104	LeBron James (32)	Kevin Love (15)	LeBron James (10)	Madison Square Garden; 19,812	34–15
50	February 6	@ Washington	140–135 (OT)	Kevin Love (39)	Love, Thompson (12)	LeBron James (17)	Verizon Center; 20,356	35–15
51	February 8	@ Indiana	132–117	Irving, Korver (29)	Love, Thompson (10)	LeBron James (9)	Bankers Life Fieldhouse; 17,580	36–15
52	February 9	@ Oklahoma City	109–118	Kyrie Irving (28)	Kevin Love (12)	LeBron James (7)	Chesapeake Energy Arena; 18,203	36–16
53	February 11	Denver	125–109	James, Irving (27)	Tristan Thompson (13)	LeBron James (12)	Quicken Loans Arena; 20,562	37–16
54	February 14	@ Minnesota	116–108	James, Irving (25)	Tristan Thompson (11)	LeBron James (14)	Target Center; 17,738	38–16
55	February 15	Indiana	113–104	LeBron James (31)	Tristan Thompson (12)	Kyrie Irving (7)	Quicken Loans Arena; 20,562	39–16
56	February 23	New York	119–104	Kyrie Irving (23)	Tristan Thompson (15)	LeBron James (14)	Quicken Loans Arena; 20,562	40–16
57	February 25	Chicago	99–117	Kyrie Irving (34)	Irving, Thompson (9)	Kyrie Irving (7)	Quicken Loans Arena; 20,562	40–17
58	February 27	Milwaukee	102–95	Kyrie Irving (25)	LeBron James (10)	LeBron James (6)	Quicken Loans Arena; 20,562	41–17

March: 7–10 (home: 3–2; road: 4–8)

Game	Date	Team	Score	High points	High rebounds	High assists	Location Attendance	Record
59	March 1	@ Boston	99–103	LeBron James (28)	James, Thompson (13)	LeBron James (10)	TD Garden; 18,624	41–18
60	March 3	@ Atlanta	135–130	Kyrie Irving (43)	LeBron James (13)	Kyrie Irving (9)	Philips Arena; 18,877	42–18
61	March 4	@ Miami	92–120	Channing Frye (21)	DeAndre Liggins (8)	Deron Williams (7)	AmericanAirlines Arena; 19,600	42–19
62	March 6	Miami	98–106	Kyrie Irving (32)	LeBron James (17)	LeBron James (6)	Quicken Loans Arena; 20,562	42–20
63	March 9	@ Detroit	101–106	LeBron James (29)	LeBron James (13)	LeBron James (10)	The Palace of Auburn Hills; 19,421	42–21
64	March 11	@ Orlando	116–104	LeBron James (24)	Tristan Thompson (13)	LeBron James (13)	Amway Center; 18,846	43–21
65	March 12	@ Houston	112–117	LeBron James (30)	Tristan Thompson (8)	Kyrie Irving (8)	Toyota Center; 18,055	43–22
66	March 14	Detroit	128–96	Kyrie Irving (26)	LeBron James (11)	LeBron James (12)	Quicken Loans Arena; 20,562	44–22
67	March 16	Utah	91–83	LeBron James (33)	LeBron James (10)	LeBron James (6)	Quicken Loans Arena; 20,562	45–22
68	March 18	@ L.A. Clippers	78–108	Richard Jefferson (12)	Jefferson, Smith, Thompson (6)	Deron Williams (5)	Staples Center; 19,096	45–23
69	March 19	@ L.A. Lakers	125–120	Kyrie Irving (46)	Kevin Love (15)	LeBron James (7)	Staples Center; 19,812	46–23
70	March 22	@ Denver	113–126	Kyrie Irving (33)	Kevin Love (7)	LeBron James (5)	Pepsi Center; 19,718	46–24
71	March 24	@ Charlotte	112–105	LeBron James (32)	Kevin Love (11)	LeBron James (12)	Spectrum Center; 19,511	47–24
72	March 25	Washington	115–127	LeBron James (24)	LeBron James (11)	LeBron James (8)	Quicken Loans Arena; 20,562	47–25
73	March 27	@ San Antonio	74–103	LeBron James (17)	LeBron James (8)	LeBron James (8)	AT&T Center; 18,418	47–26
74	March 30	@ Chicago	93–99	LeBron James (26)	James, Love (10)	LeBron James (8)	United Center; 22,282	47–27
75	March 31	Philadelphia	122–105	LeBron James (34)	Tristan Thompson (11)	Kyrie Irving (9)	Quicken Loans Arena; 20,562	48–27

April: 3–4 (home: 2–2; road: 1–2)

Game	Date	Team	Score	High points	High rebounds	High assists	Location Attendance	Record
76	April 2	Indiana	135–130 (2OT)	LeBron James (41)	LeBron James (16)	LeBron James (11)	Quicken Loans Arena; 20,562	49–27
77	April 4	Orlando	122–102	Kevin Love (28)	James, Love (11)	LeBron James (11)	Quicken Loans Arena; 20,562	50–27
78	April 5	@ Boston	114–91	LeBron James (36)	Kevin Love (16)	LeBron James (6)	TD Garden; 18,624	51–27
79	April 7	Atlanta	100–114	LeBron James (27)	Kevin Love (15)	Irving, James (7)	Quicken Loans Arena; 20,562	51–28
80	April 9	@ Atlanta	125–126 (OT)	Kyrie Irving (45)	LeBron James (16)	LeBron James (10)	Philips Arena; 18,688	51–29
81	April 10	@ Miami	121–124 (OT)	Deron Williams (35)	Kevin Love (10)	Deron Williams (9)	AmericanAirlines Arena; 19,673	51–30
82	April 12	Toronto	83–98	Iman Shumpert (11)	Walter Tavares (10)	Deron Williams (4)	Quicken Loans Arena; 20,562	51–31

2016–17 season schedule

=== Playoffs ===
2017 playoff game log
Total: 13–5 (home: 6–2; road: 7–3)
First Round: 4–0 (home: 2–0; road: 2–0)

Game	Date	Team	Score	High points	High rebounds	High assists	Location Attendance	Series
1	April 15	Indiana	109–108	LeBron James (32)	Tristan Thompson (13)	LeBron James (13)	Quicken Loans Arena; 20,562	1–0
2	April 17	Indiana	117–111	Kyrie Irving (37)	Kevin Love (11)	LeBron James (7)	Quicken Loans Arena; 20,562	2–0
3	April 20	@ Indiana	119–114	LeBron James (41)	LeBron James (13)	LeBron James (12)	Bankers Life Fieldhouse; 17,923	3–0
4	April 23	@ Indiana	106–102	LeBron James (33)	Kevin Love (16)	LeBron James (4)	Bankers Life Fieldhouse; 17,923	4–0

Conference Semifinals: 4–0 (home: 2–0; road: 2–0)

Game	Date	Team	Score	High points	High rebounds	High assists	Location Attendance	Series
1	May 1	Toronto	116–105	LeBron James (35)	Tristan Thompson (14)	Kyrie Irving (10)	Quicken Loans Arena; 20,562	1–0
2	May 3	Toronto	125–103	LeBron James (39)	Tristan Thompson (9)	Kyrie Irving (11)	Quicken Loans Arena; 20,562	2–0
3	May 5	@ Toronto	115–94	LeBron James (35)	Kevin Love (13)	LeBron James (7)	Air Canada Centre; 20,354	3–0
4	May 7	@ Toronto	109–102	LeBron James (35)	LeBron James (9)	Kyrie Irving (9)	Air Canada Centre; 20,307	4–0

Conference Finals: 4–1 (home: 1–1; road: 3–0)

Game	Date	Team	Score	High points	High rebounds	High assists	Location Attendance	Series
1	May 17	@ Boston	117–104	LeBron James (38)	Kevin Love (12)	LeBron James (7)	TD Garden; 18,624	1–0
2	May 19	@ Boston	130–86	LeBron James (30)	Kevin Love (12)	LeBron James (7)	TD Garden; 18,624	2–0
3	May 21	Boston	108–111	Kyrie Irving (29)	Tristan Thompson (13)	Kyrie Irving (7)	Quicken Loans Arena; 20,562	2–1
4	May 23	Boston	112–99	Kyrie Irving (42)	Kevin Love (17)	LeBron James (6)	Quicken Loans Arena; 20,562	3–1
5	May 25	@ Boston	135–102	LeBron James (35)	Kevin Love (11)	LeBron James (8)	TD Garden; 18,624	4–1

NBA Finals: 1–4 (home: 1–1; road: 0–3)

Game	Date	Team	Score	High points	High rebounds	High assists	Location Attendance	Series
1	June 1	@ Golden State	91–113	LeBron James (28)	Kevin Love (21)	LeBron James (8)	Oracle Arena; 19,596	0–1
2	June 4	@ Golden State	113–132	LeBron James (29)	LeBron James (11)	LeBron James (14)	Oracle Arena; 19,596	0–2
3	June 7	Golden State	113–118	LeBron James (39)	Kevin Love (13)	LeBron James (9)	Quicken Loans Arena; 20,562	0–3
4	June 9	Golden State	137–116	Kyrie Irving (40)	James, Thompson (11)	LeBron James (10)	Quicken Loans Arena; 20,562	1–3
5	June 12	@ Golden State	120–129	LeBron James (41)	LeBron James (13)	LeBron James (8)	Oracle Arena; 19,596	1–4

2017 playoff schedule

== Player statistics ==
Legend
GP	Games played	GS	Games started	MPG	Minutes per game
FG%	Field-goal percentage	3P%	3-point field-goal percentage	FT%	Free-throw percentage
RPG	Rebounds per game	APG	Assists per game	SPG	Steals per game
BPG	Blocks per game	PPG	Points per game

=== Regular season ===
Player	GP	GS	MPG	FG%	3P%	FT%	RPG	APG	SPG	BPG	PPG
Richard Jefferson	79	13	20.4	.446	.333	.741	2.6	1.0	.3	.1	5.7
Tristan Thompson	78	78	29.9	.600	.000	.498	9.2	1.0	.5	1.1	8.1
Iman Shumpert	76	31	25.5	.411	.360	.789	2.9	1.4	.8	.4	7.5
LeBron James	74	74	37.8	.548	.363	.674	8.6	8.7	1.2	.6	26.4
Channing Frye	74	15	18.9	.458	.409	.851	3.9	.6	.4	.5	9.1
Kyrie Irving	72	72	35.1	.473	.401	.905	3.2	5.8	1.2	.3	25.2
DeAndre Liggins^{†}	61	19	12.3	.382	.378	.622	1.7	.9	.7	.2	2.4
Kevin Love	60	60	31.4	.427	.373	.871	11.1	1.9	.9	.4	19.0
James Jones	48	2	7.9	.478	.470	.650	.8	.3	.1	.2	2.8
Kay Felder	42	0	9.2	.392	.318	.714	1.0	1.4	.4	.2	4.0
J. R. Smith	41	35	29.0	.346	.351	.667	2.8	1.5	1.0	.3	8.6
Jordan McRae	37	4	10.4	.387	.353	.794	1.1	.5	.2	.2	4.4
Kyle Korver^{†}	35	1	24.5	.487	.485	.933	2.8	1.0	.3	.2	10.7
Derrick Williams^{†}	25	0	17.1	.505	.404	.692	2.3	.6	.2	.1	6.2
Deron Williams^{†}	24	4	20.3	.463	.415	.840	1.9	3.6	.3	.3	7.5
Mike Dunleavy Jr.^{†}	23	2	15.9	.400	.351	.737	2.0	.9	.3	.1	4.6
Chris Andersen	12	0	9.5	.409	.000	.714	2.6	.4	.4	.6	2.3
Larry Sanders	5	0	2.6	.250		1.000	.8	.0	.2	.2	.8
Edy Tavares^{†}	1	0	24.0	.750		.000	10.0	1.0	.0	6.0	6.0
Dahntay Jones	1	0	12.0	.375	.000	.750	2.0	1.0	.0	.0	9.0
Andrew Bogut^{†}	1	0	1.0				.0	.0	.0	.0	.0

=== Playoffs ===
Player	GP	GS	MPG	FG%	3P%	FT%	RPG	APG	SPG	BPG	PPG
LeBron James	18	18	41.3	.565	.411	.698	9.1	7.8	1.9	1.3	32.8
Kyrie Irving	18	18	36.3	.468	.373	.905	2.8	5.3	1.3	.4	25.9
Kevin Love	18	18	32.1	.436	.450	.840	10.6	1.7	1.2	.9	16.8
Tristan Thompson	18	18	31.2	.587		.667	8.3	1.4	.5	.7	8.2
J. R. Smith	18	18	27.1	.505	.500	.455	2.3	.7	.7	.3	8.1
Kyle Korver	18	0	18.1	.425	.391	1.000	1.7	.7	.4	.3	5.8
Deron Williams	18	0	14.6	.438	.387	.909	1.3	2.1	.6	.1	4.3
Iman Shumpert	17	0	16.2	.417	.385	.824	2.8	.9	.6	.2	4.4
Richard Jefferson	14	0	12.8	.421	.263	.643	1.8	.5	.1	.2	3.9
Channing Frye	12	0	12.8	.517	.513	.857	1.8	1.1	.3	.3	7.3
Dahntay Jones	10	0	3.3	.500	.500	1.000	.7	.1	.0	.1	1.6
Derrick Williams	8	0	4.8	.533	.600	1.000	.4	.5	.0	.1	2.6
James Jones	8	0	3.8	.200	.000		.5	.0	.0	.0	.3

- ^{†} Denotes player spent time with another team in the season. Stats reflect time with the Cavaliers only.

== Transactions ==
=== Trades ===
June 23, 2016	To Cleveland Cavaliers Draft rights to Kay Felder	To Atlanta Hawks Cash considerations
July 7, 2016	To Cleveland Cavaliers Draft rights to Albert Miralles	To Milwaukee Bucks Matthew Dellavedova (sign and trade); Cash considerations
July 7, 2016	To Cleveland Cavaliers Mike Dunleavy Jr. Draft rights to Vladimir Veremeenko	To Chicago Bulls Draft rights to Albert Miralles
July 15, 2016	To Cleveland Cavaliers Draft rights to Chukwudiebere Maduabum	To Philadelphia 76ers Sasha Kaun; Cash considerations
January 7, 2017	To Cleveland Cavaliers Kyle Korver	To Atlanta Hawks Mike Dunleavy Jr. Mo Williams; 2019 protected 1st-round draft pick Cash considerations
February 13, 2017	To Cleveland Cavaliers 2017 Charlotte protected 2nd-round pick	To Charlotte Hornets Chris Andersen; Cash considerations

=== Free agency ===
==== Re-signed ====
Player	Signed
Richard Jefferson	2-year contract worth $5 million
James Jones	1-year contract worth $1.55 million
LeBron James	3-year contract worth $100 million
J. R. Smith	4-year contract worth $57 million

==== Additions ====
Player	Signed	Former team
Chris Andersen	1-year contract worth $1.55 million	Memphis Grizzlies
Derrick Williams		Miami Heat
Deron Williams	1-year contract worth $410,733	Dallas Mavericks
Andrew Bogut	1-year contract worth $383,351	Philadelphia 76ers
Larry Sanders		Milwaukee Bucks

==== Subtractions ====
Player	Reason left	New team
Timofey Mozgov	4-year contract worth $64 million	Los Angeles Lakers
Jordan McRae	Waived	
Andrew Bogut	Waived	
DeAndre Liggins	Waived	Dallas Mavericks
Larry Sanders	Waived	
