= Tomáš Satoranský =

Czech basketball player (born 1991)

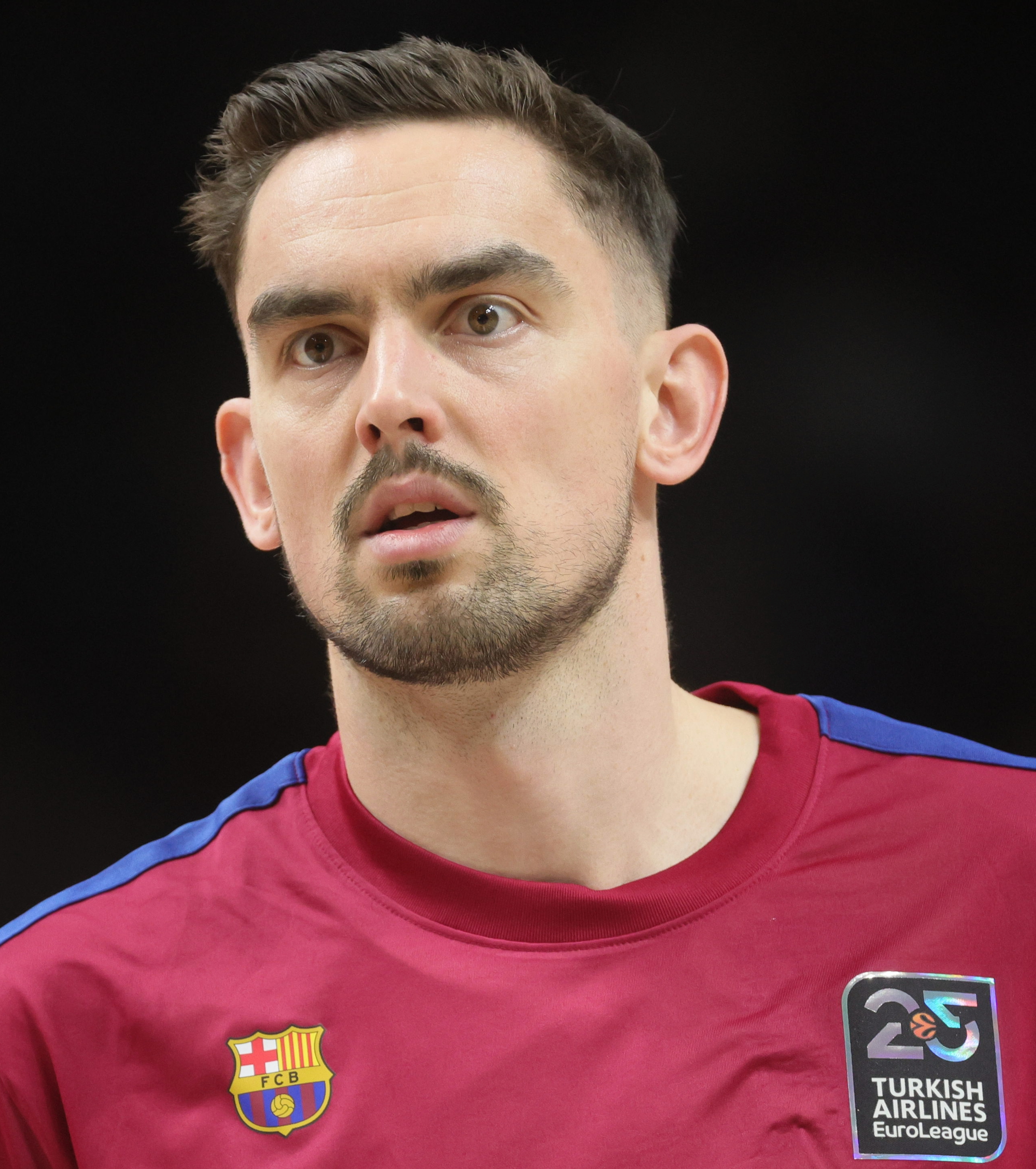
- Satoranský with FC Barcelona in 2025

No. 13 – Hapoel Tel Aviv
- Position: Point guard
- League: Israeli Basketball Premier League; EuroLeague

Personal information
- Born: 30 October 1991 (age 35) Prague, Czechoslovakia
- Listed height: 6 ft 7 in (2.01 m)
- Listed weight: 210 lb (95 kg)

Career information
- NBA draft: 2012: 2nd round, 32nd overall pick
- Drafted by: Washington Wizards
- Playing career: 2007–present

Career history
- 2007–2009: USK Praha
- 2009–2014: Cajasol Sevilla
- 2014–2016: FC Barcelona
- 2016–2019: Washington Wizards
- 2019–2021: Chicago Bulls
- 2021–2022: New Orleans Pelicans
- 2022: San Antonio Spurs
- 2022: Washington Wizards
- 2022–2026: FC Barcelona
- 2026–present: Hapoel Tel Aviv

Career highlights
- Liga ACB champion (2023); EuroBasket single-game assist record (17 assists vs. Greece, 2022); FIBA Olympic Qualifying Tournament MVP (Victoria 2021); ACB Most Spectacular Player (2016); All-Liga ACB Second Team (2016); Liga ACB Slam Dunk Contest Champion (2010); Spanish Supercup winner (2015); 9× Czech Player of the Year (2013–2015, 2018–2021, 2023, 2026)
- Stats at NBA.com
- Stats at Basketball Reference

Tomáš Satoranský (born 30 October 1991) is a Czech professional basketball player for Hapoel Tel Aviv of the Israeli Basketball Premier League and the EuroLeague.

Satoranský has played in the NBA for the Washington Wizards, Chicago Bulls, New Orleans Pelicans, and San Antonio Spurs. He has also played for the Czech Republic men's national basketball team. Standing at 6 ft 8 in (2.03 m), he primarily plays at the point guard position, but he can also play as a shooting guard or small forward due to his height and wingspan.

== Professional career ==
=== USK Praha (2007–2009) ===
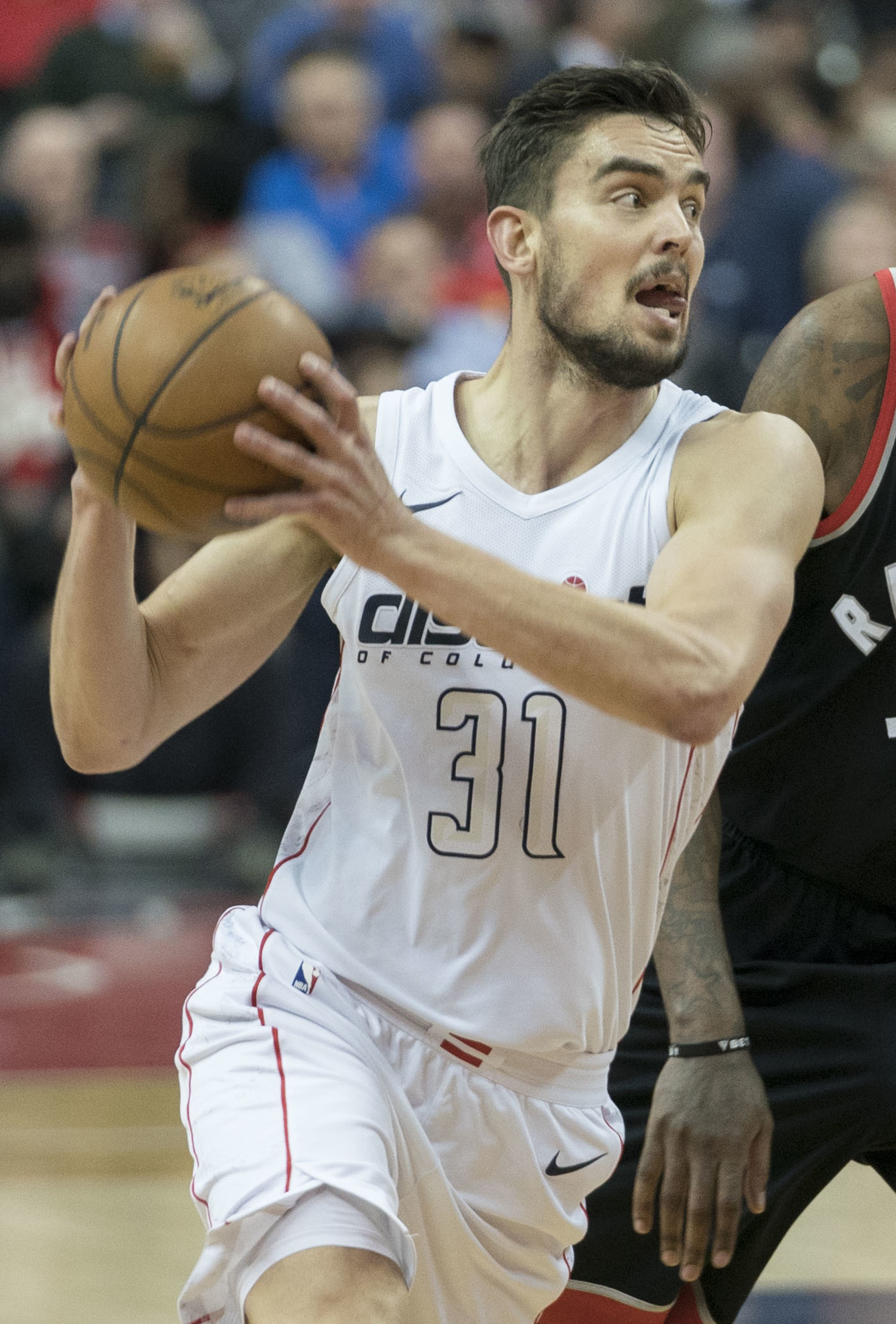
Satoranský with the Washington Wizards in 2018

From 2007 to 2009, Satoranský played with USK Praha.

=== Sevilla (2009–2014) ===
In 2009, Satoranský signed with CB Sevilla of the Spanish ACB League, with whom he played for the next five seasons. He was selected in the second round of the 2012 NBA draft (32nd overall) by the Washington Wizards. He played five games in the 2012 NBA Summer League, averaging 13.5 minutes , 4.4 points, 1.2 rebounds, and 1.8 assists per game.

His best season with Sevilla was 2013-14, when at 21 years of age in 37 games Satoranský averaged 30.8 minutes, 12.1 points, 3.8 rebounds, 4.8 assists, and 1.5 steals per game, all career highs, while shooting 46.7% from the floor and 82.2% from the free throw line.

=== FC Barcelona (2014–2016) ===
In July 2014, Satoranský signed a two-year deal with FC Barcelona Lassa. In 2014-15, in 71 games he averaged 20.3 minutes, 8.1 points, 2.9 rebounds, and 3.3 assists per game, while shooting 54.2% from the floor, 43.5% from the three-point line, and 83.9% from the free throw line.

In 2015-16, in 73 games Satoranský averaged 24.3 minutes, 10.0 points, 2.9 rebounds, and 4.2 assists per game, while shooting 53.7% from the floor and 40.7% from the three-point line.

In July 2016, Satoranský parted ways with Barcelona in order to join the NBA.

=== Washington Wizards (2016–2019) ===
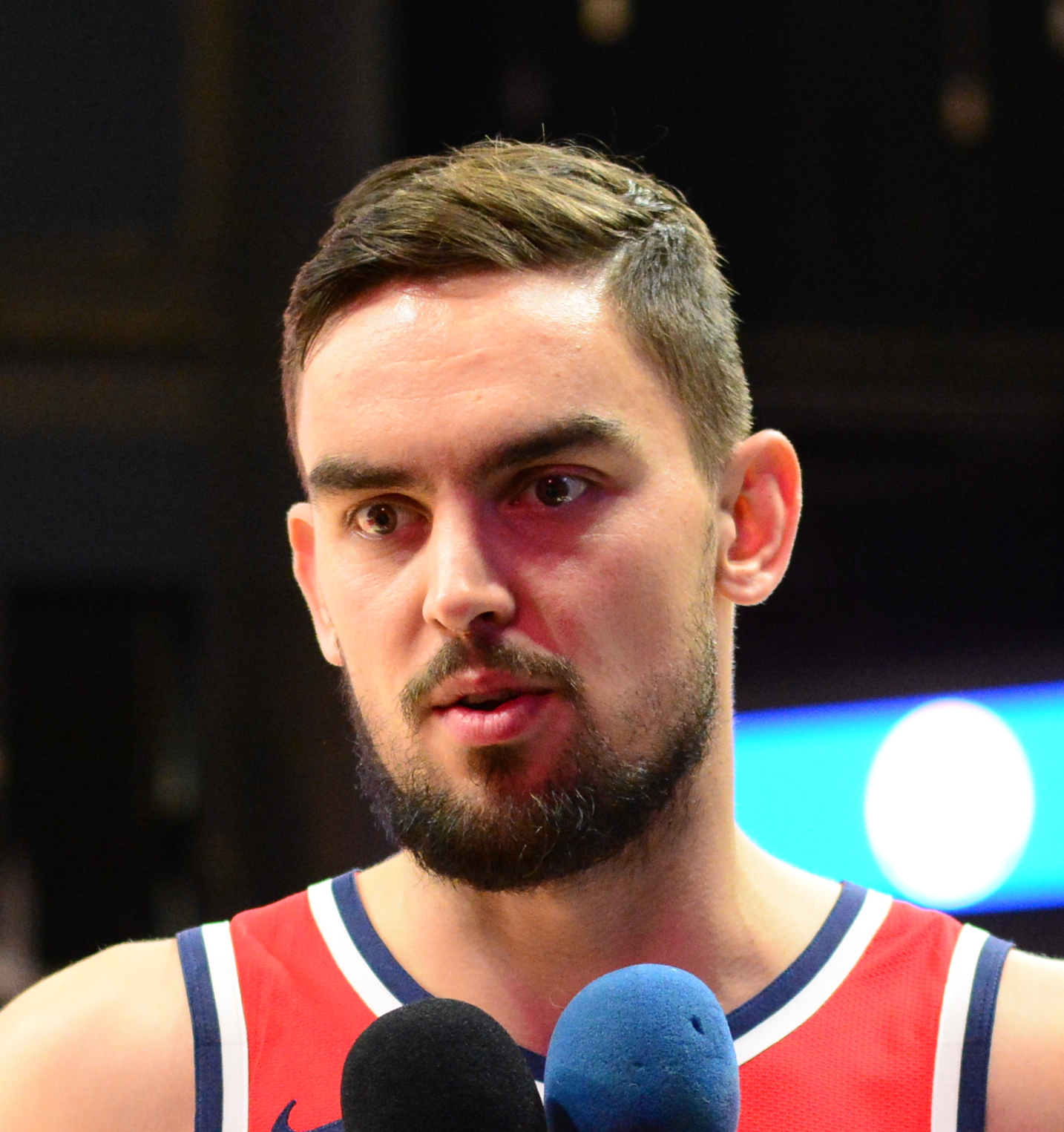
Satoranský being interviewed in 2018

On 21 July 2016, Satoranský signed with the Washington Wizards. In 2016-17, in 57 games he averaged 12.6 minutes, 2.7 points, 1.5 rebounds, and 1.6 assists per game.

On 1 December 2017, he scored a career-high 17 points in a 109–91 win over the Detroit Pistons. On 3 February 2018, Satoranský set a new career high with 19 points in a 115–98 win over the Orlando Magic. He surpassed that mark a week later, scoring 25 points on 10-of-12 shooting in a 101–90 win over the Chicago Bulls. In 2017-18, in 73 games he averaged 22.5 minutes, 7.2 points, 3.2 rebounds, and 3.9 assists per game, while shooting 52.3% from the floor and 46.5% from three-point range.

On 11 January 2019, Satoranský recorded his first career triple-double with 18 points, a career-high 12 rebounds, and 10 assists in a 113–106 win over the Milwaukee Bucks. In 2018-19, in 80 games he averaged 27.0 minutes, 8.9 points, 3.5 rebounds, 5.0 assists, and 1.5 steals per game, while shooting 48.5% from the field and 81.9% from the free throw line.

=== Chicago Bulls (2019–2021) ===
On 6 July 2019, Satoranský was traded to the Chicago Bulls in a sign-and-trade deal. On 6 January 2020, Satoranský logged 11 points, 5 rebounds, and a career-high 14 assists in a 110–118 loss to the Dallas Mavericks. In 2019-20, in 65 games he averaged 28.9 minutes, 9.9 points, 3.9 rebounds, 5.4 assists, and 1.2 steals per game, all career NBA highs, while shooting 87.6% from the free throw line.

In 2020-21 with the Bulls, in 58 games Satoranský averaged 22.5 minutes, 7.7 points, 2.4 rebounds, and 4.7 assists per game, while shooting 51.4% from the floor and 84.8% from the free throw line.

=== New Orleans Pelicans (2021–2022) ===
On 8 August 2021, Satoranský was traded to the New Orleans Pelicans, along with Garrett Temple and draft picks, for Lonzo Ball. In 2021-22 with the Pelicans, in 32 games he averaged 15.0 minutes, 2.8 points, 2.0 rebounds, and 2.4 assists per game.

=== San Antonio Spurs (2022) ===
On 8 February 2022, the Portland Trail Blazers acquired Satoranský, Nickeil Alexander-Walker, Josh Hart, Didi Louzada, a protected 2022 first-round draft pick, the better of New Orleans’ and Portland's 2026 second-round draft picks. and New Orleans' 2027 second-round draft pick from the New Orleans Pelicans in exchange for CJ McCollum, Larry Nance Jr., and Tony Snell.

A day later, Satoranský was traded yet again, this time to the San Antonio Spurs in a three-team trade. He played one game for the Spurs, before agreeing to a contract buyout on 26 February 2022.

=== Return to Washington (2022) ===
On 28 February 2022, Satoranský signed a rest-of-season contract with the Washington Wizards. In 2022 playing for Washington, in 22 games he averaged 18.9 minutes, 4.9 points, 2.8 rebounds, and 4.9 assists per game, while shooting 47.6% from the floor and 84.0% from the free throw line.

=== Return to FC Barcelona (2022–2026) ===
Satoranský with FC Barcelonain 2025

On 4 July 2022, Satoranský signed a four-year deal with his former club FC Barcelona of the Spanish Liga ACB and the EuroLeague, joining his national squad teammate Jan Veselý under the guidance of coach Šarūnas Jasikevičius. The team would be crowned champions of the 2022–23 ACB after beating Real Madrid in the finals, with Satoranský winning the first national title in his career. In 2022-23, in 79 games he averaged 23.1 minutes, 8.4 points,3.3 rebounds, and 4.1 assists per game, while shooting 51.9% from the floor and 45.5% from the three-point line.

In 2023-24, in 79 games Satoranský averaged 24.0 minutes, 7.7 points, 3.8 rebounds, 4.2 assists, and 1.0 steals per game, while shooting 47.4% from the floor and 40.3% from the three-point line.

In 2024-25, in 77 games he averaged 23.3 minutes, 7.1 points, 3.2 rebounds, and 4.8 assists per game, while shooting 45.7% from the floor.

After the retirement of Álex Abrines in July 2025, Satoranský became team captain of FC Barcelona. In 2025-26, in 77 games he averaged 23.0 minutes, 6.3 points, 2.9 rebounds, and 3.9 assists per game, while shooting 45.8% from the floor and 44.4% from the three point line.

On June 30, 2026, Satoranský left Barcelona upon the expiration of his contract.

=== Hapoel Tel Aviv (2026–present) ===
On July 15, 2026, Satoranský signed a one-year deal with Hapoel Tel Aviv of the Israeli Basketball Premier League and the EuroLeague.

== National team career ==
Satoranský has played in all of the age categories for the Czech Republic national basketball team. He joined the senior national team for the first time during EuroBasket 2009 qualifiers. In 2010, he played at the 2010 FIBA Europe Under-20 Championship, with the Czech Republic Under-20 junior national team. Satoranský has also represented the Czech senior national team at EuroBasket 2013 and EuroBasket 2015. He also played at EuroBasket 2017, and helped the Czech Republic qualify to the 2019 FIBA World Cup for the first time.

Satoransky scored 14 points in a loss to France in the preliminary round of the 2020 Olympics in Tokyo.

== Career statistics ==
Legend
GP	Games played	GS	Games started	MPG	Minutes per game
FG%	Field-goal percentage	3P%	3-point field-goal percentage	FT%	Free-throw percentage
RPG	Rebounds per game	APG	Assists per game	SPG	Steals per game
BPG	Blocks per game	PPG	Points per game	PIR	Performance index rating
**Bold**	Career high

=== NBA ===
==== Regular season ====
Year	Team	GP	GS	MPG	FG%	3P%	FT%	RPG	APG	SPG	BPG	PPG
2016–17	Washington	57	3	12.6	.418	.243	.697	1.5	1.6	.5	.1	2.7
2017–18	Washington	73	30	22.5	**.523**	**.465**	.781	3.2	3.9	.7	**.2**	7.2
2018–19	Washington	**80**	54	27.1	.485	.395	.819	3.5	5.0	1.0	**.2**	8.9
2019–20	Chicago	65	**64**	**28.9**	.430	.322	**.876**	**3.9**	**5.4**	**1.2**	.1	**9.9**
2020–21	Chicago	58	18	22.5	.514	.356	.848	2.4	4.7	.7	**.2**	7.7
2021–22	New Orleans	32	3	15.0	.299	.161	.760	2.0	2.4	.4	.0	2.8
2021–22	San Antonio	1	0	9.0	—	—	.750	1.0	—	—	—	3.0
2021–22	Washington	22	10	18.9	.476	.273	.840	2.8	4.9	.7	**.2**	4.9
Career		388	182	22.2	.468	.354	.820	2.9	4.1	.8	.2	6.9

==== Playoffs ====
Year	Team	GP	GS	MPG	FG%	3P%	FT%	RPG	APG	SPG	BPG	PPG
2017	Washington	**10**	0	3.6	**.500**	—	.400	.5	**.6**	**.1**	—	.8
2018	Washington	6	0	**10.0**	.154	.000	**.750**	**1.5**	.5	.0	—	**1.2**
Career		16	0	6.0	.263	.000	.556	.9	.6	.1	—	.9

=== EuroLeague ===
Year	Team	GP	GS	MPG	FG%	3P%	FT%	RPG	APG	SPG	BPG	PPG	PIR
2014–15	Barcelona	27	12	19.2	.470	.391	**.850**	3.0	3.2	.8	.2	7.2	10.7
2015–16	Barcelona	29	27	24.5	**.567**	.366	.755	2.8	4.3	.9	**.3**	**9.0**	12.0
2022–23	Barcelona	36	**36**	24.4	.514	**.487**	.823	3.8	4.3	.7	.1	8.4	**12.6**
2023–24	Barcelona	**39**	**36**	**25.0**	.447	.366	.721	**4.3**	4.0	**1.1**	.1	7.0	11.3
2024–25	Barcelona	**39**	34	23.4	.500	.347	.675	3.2	**5.3**	.9	.1	5.9	9.7
Career		170	145	23.3	.526	.391	.772	3.5	4.3	.9	.2	7.4	11.3

=== EuroCup ===
Year	Team	GP	GS	MPG	FG%	3P%	FT%	RPG	APG	SPG	BPG	PPG	PIR
2010–11	CDB Sevilla	**16**	**15**	23.6	**.448**	**.438**	**.818**	2.9	3.4	**1.1**	**.2**	6.9	8.9
2011–12	CDB Sevilla	12	9	**28.0**	.444	.300	.769	**3.8**	**4.8**	.8	.1	**10.2**	**11.8**
Career		28	24	25.5	.446	.385	.792	3.3	4.0	1.0	.1	8.3	10.1

=== Domestic leagues ===
Year	Team	League	GP	MPG	FG%	3P%	FT%	RPG	APG	SPG	BPG	PPG
2007–08	(Czech Republic) USK Praha	NBL	27	14.4	.470	.226	.742	2.3	1.4	.6	.1	6.1
2008–09	(Czech Republic) USK Praha	NBL	35	22.1	.484	.256	.738	4.6	2.1	1.0	.1	9.9
2009–10	(Spain) CDB Sevilla	ACB	28	7.2	.500	.273	.789	.7	.9	.3	.2	2.4
2009–10	(Spain) Qalat	LEB Plata	13	29.2	.368	.241	.833	3.9	2.8	1.1	—	11.5
2010–11	(Spain) CDB Sevilla	ACB	34	20.9	.463	.407	.719	2.2	2.4	1.0	.2	7.1
2011–12	(Spain) CDB Sevilla	ACB	36	17.2	.430	.273	.702	2.1	1.3	.5	.1	4.8
2012–13	(Spain) CDB Sevilla	ACB	33	29.2	.469	.342	.786	3.1	4.2	1.2	.2	12.4
2013–14	(Spain) CDB Sevilla	ACB	37	30.8	.467	.349	.822	3.8	4.8	1.5	.0	12.1
2014–15	(Spain) Barcelona	ACB	41	20.8	.583	.456	.838	2.9	3.4	.8	.1	8.7
2015–16	(Spain) Barcelona	ACB	43	24.3	.567	.439	.775	2.9	4.3	.9	.1	10.7
2022–23	(Spain) Barcelona	ACB	40	22.2	.523	.417	.767	2.8	4.1	1.0	.0	8.6
2023–24	(Spain) Barcelona	ACB	36	22.8	.488	.423	.766	3.3	4.5	.8	.1	8.0

Olympic Games
Preceded by Lukáš Krpálek	Flagbearer for Czech Republic (with Petra Kvitová); Tokyo 2020	Succeeded by Lukáš Krpálek and Marie Horáčková
