= 2016–17 Washington Wizards season =

Season of National Basketball Association team the Washington Wizards

- Division champions
- Head coach: Scott Brooks
- General manager: Ernie Grunfeld
- Owners: Monumental Sports & Entertainment
- Arena: Verizon Center

Results
- Record: 49–33 (.598)
- Place: Division: 1st (Southeast); Conference: 4th (Eastern)
- Playoff finish: Conference Semifinals (lost to Celtics 3–4)
- Stats at Basketball Reference

The 2016–17 Washington Wizards season marked the franchise's 56th season in the National Basketball Association (NBA) and its 44th in the Washington, D.C. area. On April 14, 2016, the Wizards parted ways with Randy Wittman, their former head coach, after the team failed to secure a playoff berth. Shortly thereafter, on April 26, 2016, the Wizards appointed Scott Brooks, formerly the head coach of the Oklahoma City Thunder, as their new head coach. The Wizards successfully clinched a playoff berth on March 24, 2017, with a 129–108 victory over the Brooklyn Nets, thus ending their one-season absence from the playoffs. Furthermore, on March 28, 2017, the Wizards emerged victorious against the Los Angeles Lakers with a score of 119–108, securing their first division title since 1979 and ending their 38-year drought that dated back to their era as the Bullets.

The Wizards finished the regular season with a 49–33 record, securing the 4th seed. In the playoffs, the Wizards defeated the Atlanta Hawks in six games in the First Round, advancing to the Semifinals, where they lost to the Boston Celtics in a hard fought seven games.

To date, this is both the best record and the highest seed the Bullets/Wizards franchise has achieved since their last NBA Finals appearance in 1979. This is also the last time the Wizards have won a playoff series.

== Draft picks ==
The Wizards did not have a pick in the 2016 NBA draft, as they had traded both picks prior to the draft:

- The first-round pick was traded away to the Phoenix Suns along with Kris Humphries and DeJuan Blair in exchange for Markieff Morris.
- The second-round pick was traded away to the Atlanta Hawks, along with the rights to Jerian Grant and a second-round pick in the 2019 NBA draft, to allow the Wizards to move up in the 2015 NBA draft and acquire the rights to Kelly Oubre Jr.

== Roster ==
2016–17 Washington Wizards roster
Players

Pos.	No.	Player	Height	Weight	DOB	From
SG	3	Bradley Beal	6 ft 5 in (1.96 m)	207 lb (94 kg)	1993-06-28	Florida
SF	44	Bojan Bogdanović	6 ft 8 in (2.03 m)	230 lb (104 kg)	1989-04-18	Croatia
PG	33	Trey Burke	6 ft 1 in (1.85 m)	191 lb (87 kg)	1992-11-12	Michigan
C	13	Marcin Gortat	6 ft 11 in (2.11 m)	240 lb (109 kg)	1984-02-17	Poland
PG	7	Brandon Jennings	6 ft 1 in (1.85 m)	170 lb (77 kg)	1989-09-23	Oak Hill Academy (VA)
C	28	Ian Mahinmi	6 ft 11 in (2.11 m)	262 lb (119 kg)	1986-11-05	France
SG	9	Sheldon McClellan	6 ft 6 in (1.98 m)	200 lb (91 kg)	1992-12-21	Miami (FL)
PF	1	Chris McCullough	6 ft 10 in (2.08 m)	235 lb (107 kg)	1995-02-05	Syracuse
PF	5	Markieff Morris	6 ft 10 in (2.08 m)	245 lb (111 kg)	1989-09-02	Kansas
C	32	Daniel Ochefu	6 ft 11 in (2.11 m)	245 lb (111 kg)	1993-12-15	Villanova
SF	12	Kelly Oubre	6 ft 7 in (2.01 m)	205 lb (93 kg)	1995-12-09	Kansas
SF	22	Otto Porter	6 ft 8 in (2.03 m)	208 lb (94 kg)	1993-06-03	Georgetown
SG	31	Tomáš Satoranský	6 ft 7 in (2.01 m)	210 lb (95 kg)	1991-10-30	Czech Republic
C	14	Jason Smith	7 ft 0 in (2.13 m)	240 lb (109 kg)	1986-03-02	Colorado State
PG	2	John Wall	6 ft 4 in (1.93 m)	210 lb (95 kg)	1990-09-06	Kentucky

Coaches
Head coach
- Scott Brooks
Assistant(s)
- Tony Brown
- Sidney Lowe
- Chad Iske
- Mike Terpstra
- Maz Trakh
- Navin Hettiarachchi (strength and conditioning)
- Corey Bennett (trainer)

Legend
- (DP) Unsigned draft pick
- (FA) Free agent
- (S) Suspended
- (DL) On assignment to D-League affiliate
- Injured

Roster
Updated: April 11, 2017

== Standings ==
=== Division ===
Southeast Division	W	L	PCT	GB	Home	Road	Div	GP
y – Washington Wizards	49	33	.598	–	30‍–‍11	19‍–‍22	8–8	82
x – Atlanta Hawks	43	39	.524	6.0	23‍–‍18	20‍–‍21	6–10	82
Miami Heat	41	41	.500	8.0	23‍–‍18	18‍–‍23	9–7	82
Charlotte Hornets	36	46	.439	13.0	22‍–‍19	14‍–‍27	10–6	82
Orlando Magic	29	53	.354	20.0	16‍–‍25	13‍–‍28	7–9	82

=== Conference ===
Eastern Conference
#	Team	W	L	PCT	GB	GP
1	c – Boston Celtics *	53	29	.646	–	82
2	y – Cleveland Cavaliers *	51	31	.622	2.0	82
3	x – Toronto Raptors	51	31	.622	2.0	82
4	y – Washington Wizards *	49	33	.598	4.0	82
5	x – Atlanta Hawks	43	39	.524	10.0	82
6	x – Milwaukee Bucks	42	40	.512	11.0	82
7	x – Indiana Pacers	42	40	.512	11.0	82
8	x – Chicago Bulls	41	41	.500	12.0	82
9	Miami Heat	41	41	.500	12.0	82
10	Detroit Pistons	37	45	.451	16.0	82
11	Charlotte Hornets	36	46	.439	17.0	82
12	New York Knicks	31	51	.378	22.0	82
13	Orlando Magic	29	53	.354	24.0	82
14	Philadelphia 76ers	28	54	.341	25.0	82
15	Brooklyn Nets	20	62	.244	33.0	82

== Game log ==
=== Pre-season ===
2016 pre-season game log
Total: 4–3 (home: 2–1; road: 2–2)
Pre-season: 4–3 (home: 2–1; road: 2–2)

Game	Date	Team	Score	High points	High rebounds	High assists	Location Attendance	Record
1	October 4	Miami	L 95–106	Kelly Oubre Jr. (16)	Marcin Gortat (6)	Tomas Satoransky (6)	Verizon Center; 9,100	0–1
2	October 6	@ Philadelphia	W 125–119 (2OT)	Kelly Oubre Jr. (24)	Jason Smith (7)	Tomas Satoransky (6)	Wells Fargo Center; 10,440	1–1
3	October 10	@ New York	L 88–90	Bradley Beal (17)	Bryant III, Oubre Jr. (7)	John Wall (4)	Madison Square Garden; 19,033	1–2
4	October 13	Philadelphia	W 100–79	Bradley Beal (22)	Andrew Nicholson (12)	John Wall (9)	Verizon Center; 10,242	2–2
5	October 15	@ Sacramento	L 119–124	Kelly Oubre Jr. (15)	Andrew Nicholson (5)	Trey Burke (10)	Rupp Arena; 8,472	2–3
6	October 18	@ Cleveland	W 96–91	John Wall (17)	Marcin Gortat (13)	Bradley Beal (5)	Value City Arena; 18,104	3–3
7	October 21	Toronto	W 119–82	Beal, Morris (19)	Marcin Gortat (8)	John Wall (11)	Verizon Center; 11,967	4–3

2016–17 season schedule

=== Regular season ===
2016–17 game log
Total: 49–33 (home: 30–11; road: 19–22)
October: 0–2 (home: 0–0; road: 0–2)

Game	Date	Team	Score	High points	High rebounds	High assists	Location Attendance	Record
1	October 27	@ Atlanta	L 99–114	Markieff Morris (22)	Marcin Gortat (11)	John Wall (10)	Philips Arena; 19,049	0–1
2	October 30	@ Memphis	L 103–112 (OT)	John Wall (22)	Marcin Gortat (12)	John Wall (13)	FedExForum; 15,573	0–2

November : 6–9 (home: 5–5; road: 1–4)

Game	Date	Team	Score	High points	High rebounds	High assists	Location Attendance	Record
3	November 2	Toronto	L 103–113	Markieff Morris (22)	Otto Porter Jr. (13)	John Wall (11)	Verizon Center; 19,581	0–3
4	November 4	Atlanta	W 95–92	Bradley Beal (28)	Marcin Gortat (12)	John Wall (6)	Verizon Center; 14,663	1–3
5	November 5	@ Orlando	L 86–88	Markieff Morris (18)	Marcin Gortat (14)	Morris, Beal, Satoranský (18)	Amway Center; 18,846	1–4
6	November 7	Houston	L 106–114	John Wall (21)	Marcin Gortat (12)	John Wall (8)	Verizon Center; 13,173	1–5
7	November 9	Boston	W 118–93	Otto Porter Jr. (34)	Otto Porter Jr. (14)	John Wall (7)	Verizon Center; 12,675	2–5
8	November 11	Cleveland	L 94–105	John Wall (28)	Marcin Gortat (15)	Otto Porter Jr. (5)	Verizon Center; 20,356	2–6
9	November 12	@ Chicago	L 95–106	Markieff Morris (24)	Markieff Morris (15)	Tomáš Satoranský (9)	United Center; 21,962	2–7
10	November 16	@ Philadelphia	L 102–109	John Wall (27)	Marcin Gortat (14)	John Wall (6)	Wells Fargo Center; 14,863	2–8
11	November 17	New York	W 119–112	John Wall (23)	Gortat, Morris, Porter Jr. (8)	John Wall (11)	Verizon Center; 16,704	3–8
12	November 19	Miami	L 111–114	Wall, Beal (34)	Marcin Gortat (16)	John Wall (8)	Verizon Center; 15,848	3–9
13	November 21	Phoenix	W 106–101	Bradley Beal (42)	Marcin Gortat (13)	John Wall (15)	Verizon Center; 12,790	4–9
14	November 25	@ Orlando	W 94–91	John Wall (26)	Marcin Gortat (9)	John Wall (10)	Amway Center; 17,103	5–9
15	November 26	San Antonio	L 100–112	Bradley Beal (25)	Marcin Gortat (10)	Wall, Beal (5)	Verizon Center; 17,066	5–10
16	November 28	Sacramento	W 101–95 (OT)	Bradley Beal (31)	Otto Porter Jr. (10)	John Wall (11)	Verizon Center; 12,571	6–10
17	November 30	@ Oklahoma City	L 115–126 (OT)	Bradley Beal (31)	Marcin Gortat (11)	John Wall (15)	Chesapeake Energy Arena; 18,203	6–11

December : 10–5 (home: 8–1; road: 2–4)

Game	Date	Team	Score	High points	High rebounds	High assists	Location Attendance	Record
18	December 2	@ San Antonio	L 105–107	Bradley Beal (23)	Marcin Gortat (18)	John Wall (15)	AT&T Center; 18,418	6–12
19	December 5	@ Brooklyn	W 108–103	John Wall (25)	Marcin Gortat (12)	John Wall (13)	Barclays Center; 12,529	7–12
20	December 6	Orlando	L 116–124	John Wall (52)	Marcin Gortat (11)	John Wall (8)	Verizon Center; 12,116	7–13
21	December 8	Denver	W 92–85	Bradley Beal (26)	Gortat, Wall (7)	Wall, Beal (5)	Verizon Center; 12,645	8–13
22	December 10	Milwaukee	W 110–105	John Wall (24)	Marcin Gortat (11)	John Wall (11)	Verizon Center; 14,816	9–13
23	December 12	@ Miami	L 101–112	John Wall (30)	Marcin Gortat (10)	John Wall (8)	American Airlines Arena; 19,600	9–14
24	December 14	Charlotte	W 109–106	John Wall (25)	Marcin Gortat (12)	John Wall (10)	Verizon Center; 13,447	10–14
25	December 16	Detroit	W 122–108	John Wall (29)	Marcin Gortat (14)	John Wall (11)	Verizon Center; 15,573	11–14
26	December 18	LA Clippers	W 117–110	Bradley Beal (41)	Markieff Morris (9)	John Wall (11)	Verizon Center; 17,380	12–14
27	December 19	@ Indiana	L 105–107	Bradley Beal (22)	Marcin Gortat (13)	John Wall (10)	Bankers Life Fieldhouse; 17,686	12–15
28	December 21	@ Chicago	W 107–97	John Wall (23)	Gortat, Morris (11)	John Wall (9)	United Center; 21,358	13–15
29	December 23	@ Milwaukee	L 96–123	Wall, Porter Jr. (18)	Marcin Gortat (6)	John Wall (10)	BMO Harris Bradley Center; 15,921	13–16
30	December 26	Milwaukee	W 107–102	Otto Porter Jr. (32)	Otto Porter Jr. (13)	John Wall (16)	Verizon Center; 15,773	14–16
31	December 28	Indiana	W 111–105	John Wall (36)	Marcin Gortat (8)	John Wall (11)	Verizon Center; 16,172	15–16
32	December 30	Brooklyn	W 118–95	Trey Burke (27)	Gortat (13)	John Wall (14)	Verizon Center; 16,461	16–16

January : 12–4 (home: 7–0; road: 5–4)

Game	Date	Team	Score	High points	High rebounds	High assists	Location Attendance	Record
33	January 2	@ Houston	L 91–101	Bradley Beal (27)	Marcin Gortat (14)	John Wall (12)	Toyota Center; 16,569	16–17
34	January 3	@ Dallas	L 105–113	John Wall (27)	Marcin Gortat (16)	John Wall (8)	American Airlines Center; 19,318	16–18
35	January 6	Minnesota	W 112–105	Bradley Beal (22)	Marcin Gortat (10)	John Wall (18)	Verizon Center; 18,686	17–18
36	January 8	@ Milwaukee	W 107–101	Bradley Beal (25)	Marcin Gortat (12)	John Wall (7)	BMO Harris Bradley Center; 15,311	18–18
37	January 10	Chicago	W 101–99	John Wall (26)	Marcin Gortat (12)	John Wall (14)	Verizon Center; 14,361	19–18
38	January 11	@ Boston	L 108–117	Bradley Beal (35)	Gortat, Morris (9)	John Wall (10)	TD Garden; 18,624	19–19
39	January 14	Philadelphia	W 109–93	John Wall (25)	Marcin Gortat (10)	John Wall (7)	Verizon Center; 17,880	20–19
40	January 16	Portland	W 120–101	Bradley Beal (25)	Markieff Morris (13)	John Wall (7)	Verizon Center; 17,395	21–19
41	January 18	Memphis	W 104–101	Wall, Porter Jr. (18)	Markieff Morris (12)	John Wall (13)	Verizon Center; 15,079	22–19
42	January 19	@ New York	W 113–110	John Wall (29)	Marcin Gortat (12)	John Wall (13)	Madison Square Garden; 19,812	23–19
43	January 21	@ Detroit	L 112–113	John Wall (19)	Markieff Morris (9)	John Wall (10)	The Palace of Auburn Hills; 18,231	23–20
44	January 23	@ Charlotte	W 109–99	John Wall (24)	Otto Porter Jr. (13)	John Wall (7)	Spectrum Center; 15,285	24–20
45	January 24	Boston	W 123–108	Bradley Beal (31)	Markieff Morris (11)	John Wall (7)	Verizon Center; 16,387	25–20
46	January 27	@ Atlanta	W 112–86	Otto Porter Jr. (21)	Marcin Gortat (12)	John Wall (9)	Philips Arena; 16,969	26–20
47	January 29	@ New Orleans	W 107–94	Bradley Beal (27)	Marcin Gortat (11)	John Wall (19)	Smoothie King Center; 16,779	27–20
48	January 31	New York	W 117–101	Bradley Beal (28)	Gortat, Morris (10)	John Wall (13)	Verizon Center; 16,683	28–20

February : 7–3 (home: 5–2; road: 2–1)

Game	Date	Team	Score	High points	High rebounds	High assists	Location Attendance	Record
49	February 2	L. A. Lakers	W 116–108	John Wall (33)	Marcin Gortat (14)	John Wall (11)	Verizon Center; 16,473	29–20
50	February 4	New Orleans	W 105–91	John Wall (24)	Marcin Gortat (17)	John Wall (13)	Verizon Center; 19,651	30–20
51	February 6	Cleveland	L 135–140 (OT)	Bradley Beal (41)	Marcin Gortat (8)	John Wall (12)	Verizon Center; 20,356	30–21
52	February 8	@ Brooklyn	W 114–110 (OT)	Bradley Beal (31)	Marcin Gortat (14)	John Wall (12)	Barclays Center; 13,179	31–21
53	February 10	Indiana	W 112–107	John Wall (26)	Marcin Gortat (16)	John Wall (14)	Verizon Center; 19,503	32–21
54	February 13	Oklahoma City	W 120–98	Bradley Beal (22)	Otto Porter Jr. (12)	John Wall (7)	Verizon Center; 20,356	33–21
55	February 16	@ Indiana	W 111–98	Otto Porter Jr. (25)	Otto Porter Jr. (8)	John Wall (12)	Bankers Life Fieldhouse; 17,233	34–21
56	February 24	@ Philadelphia	L 112–120	Bradley Beal (40)	Marcin Gortat (11)	John Wall (14)	Wells Fargo Center; 19,277	34–22
57	February 26	Utah	L 92–102	John Wall (23)	Marcin Gortat (8)	John Wall (11)	Verizon Center; 19,648	34–23
58	February 28	Golden State	W 112–108	Bradley Beal (25)	Marcin Gortat (12)	John Wall (19)	Verizon Center; 20,356	35–23

March : 11–7 (home: 4–2; road: 7–5)

Game	Date	Team	Score	High points	High rebounds	High assists	Location Attendance	Record
59	March 1	@ Toronto	W 105–96	Bojan Bogdanovic (27)	Marcin Gortat (8)	John Wall (13)	Air Canada Centre; 19,800	36–23
60	March 3	Toronto	L 106–114	John Wall (30)	Otto Porter Jr., Morris, Wall (8)	John Wall (7)	Verizon Center; 20,356	36–24
61	March 5	Orlando	W 115–114	Bradley Beal (32)	Marcin Gortat (11)	John Wall (10)	Verizon Center; 19,195	37–24
62	March 7	@ Phoenix	W 131–127	Bojan Bogdanovic (29)	Mahinmi, Bogdanovic (9)	John Wall (14)	Talking Stick Resort Arena; 16,372	38–24
63	March 8	@ Denver	W 123–113	John Wall (30)	Marcin Gortat (15)	John Wall (10)	Pepsi Center; 12,323	39–24
64	March 10	@ Sacramento	W 130–122 (OT)	Bradley Beal (38)	Bradley Beal (10)	John Wall (12)	Golden 1 Center; 17,608	40–24
65	March 11	@ Portland	W 125–124 (OT)	John Wall (39)	Marcin Gortat (15)	John Wall (9)	Moda Center; 19,482	41–24
66	March 13	@ Minnesota	L 104–119	John Wall (27)	Beal, Morris, Mahinmi (7)	Jennings, Wall (5)	Target Center; 15,747	41–25
67	March 15	Dallas	L 107–112	John Wall (26)	Otto Porter Jr., Gortat (10)	John Wall (11)	Verizon Center; 17,844	41–26
68	March 17	Chicago	W 112–107	Bradley Beal (24)	Otto Porter Jr., Gortat (10)	John Wall (20)	Verizon Center; 20,356	42–26
69	March 18	@ Charlotte	L 93–98	John Wall (19)	Marcin Gortat (16)	John Wall (8)	Spectrum Center; 19,361	42–27
70	March 20	@ Boston	L 102–110	Bradley Beal (19)	Bojan Bogdanovic (6)	John Wall (8)	TD Garden; 18,624	42–28
71	March 22	Atlanta	W 104–100	Bradley Beal (28)	Ian Mahinmi (10)	John Wall (10)	Verizon Center; 18,137	43–28
72	March 24	Brooklyn	W 129–108	John Wall (22)	Marcin Gortat (9)	Jennings, Wall (9)	Verizon Center; 19,616	44–28
73	March 25	@ Cleveland	W 127–115	John Wall (37)	Otto Porter Jr. (7)	John Wall (11)	Quicken Loans Arena; 20,562	45–28
74	March 28	@ L. A. Lakers	W 119–108	John Wall (34)	Marcin Gortat (10)	John Wall (14)	Staples Center; 18,997	46–28
75	March 29	@ L. A. Clippers	L 124–133	John Wall (41)	Mahinmi, Smith (8)	John Wall (8)	Staples Center; 19,060	46–29
76	March 31	@ Utah	L 88–95	Bradley Beal (27)	Marcin Gortat (11)	John Wall (5)	Vivint Smart Home Arena; 19,911	46–30

April : 3–3 (home: 1–1; road: 2–2)

Game	Date	Team	Score	High points	High rebounds	High assists	Location Attendance	Record
77	April 2	@ Golden State	L 115–139	Bradley Beal (20)	Brandon Jennings (7)	John Wall (11)	Oracle Arena; 19,596	46–31
78	April 4	Charlotte	W 118–111	John Wall (23)	Markieff Morris (6)	John Wall (13)	Verizon Center; 18,614	47–31
79	April 6	@ New York	W 106–103	Bradley Beal (25)	Otto Porter Jr. (9)	John Wall (8)	Madison Square Garden; 19,812	48–31
80	April 8	Miami	L 103–106	Markieff Morris (21)	Marcin Gortat (11)	John Wall (8)	Verizon Center; 20,365	48–32
81	April 10	@ Detroit	W 105–101	Bradley Beal (33)	Ian Mahinmi (11)	John Wall (6)	The Palace of Auburn Hills; 21,012	49–32
82	April 12	@ Miami	L 102–110	Trey Burke (27)	Otto Porter Jr. (6)	Jennings, Satoransky (5)	AmericanAirlines Arena; 19,963	49–33

2016–17 season schedule

=== Playoffs ===
2017 playoff game log
Total: 7–6 (home: 6–0; road: 1–6)
First Round: 4–2 (home: 3–0; road: 1–2)

Game	Date	Team	Score	High points	High rebounds	High assists	Location Attendance	Series
1	April 16	Atlanta	W 114–107	John Wall (32)	Marcin Gortat (10)	John Wall (14)	Verizon Center; 20,356	1–0
2	April 19	Atlanta	W 109–101	John Wall (32)	Marcin Gortat (10)	John Wall (9)	Verizon Center; 20,356	2–0
3	April 22	@ Atlanta	L 98–116	John Wall (29)	Marcin Gortat (8)	John Wall (7)	Philips Arena; 18,729	2–1
4	April 24	@ Atlanta	L 101–111	Bradley Beal (32)	Marcin Gortat (18)	John Wall (10)	Philips Arena; 18,676	2–2
5	April 26	Atlanta	W 103–99	Bradley Beal (27)	Marcin Gortat (10)	John Wall (14)	Verizon Center; 20,356	3–2
6	April 28	@ Atlanta	W 115–99	John Wall (42)	Morris, Porter (8)	John Wall (8)	Philips Arena; 18,746	4–2

Conference Semifinals: 3–4 (home: 3–0; road: 0–4)

Game	Date	Team	Score	High points	High rebounds	High assists	Location Attendance	Series
1	April 30	@ Boston	L 111–123	Bradley Beal (27)	Marcin Gortat (13)	John Wall (16)	TD Garden; 18,624	0–1
2	May 2	@ Boston	L 119–129 (OT)	John Wall (40)	Marcin Gortat (10)	John Wall (13)	TD Garden; 18,624	0–2
3	May 4	Boston	W 116–89	John Wall (24)	Marcin Gortat (16)	John Wall (8)	Verizon Center; 20,356	1–2
4	May 7	Boston	W 121–102	Bradley Beal (29)	Markieff Morris (10)	John Wall (12)	Verizon Center; 20,356	2–2
5	May 10	@ Boston	L 101–123	John Wall (21)	Marcin Gortat (11)	Bogdanovic, Beal, Wall (4)	TD Garden; 18,624	2–3
6	May 12	Boston	W 92–91	Bradley Beal (33)	Marcin Gortat (13)	John Wall (8)	Verizon Center; 20,356	3–3
7	May 15	@ Boston	L 105–115	Bradley Beal (38)	Marcin Gortat (11)	John Wall (11)	TD Garden; 18,624	3–4

2017 playoff schedule

== Player statistics ==
Legend
GP	Games played	GS	Games started	MPG	Minutes per game
FG%	Field-goal percentage	3P%	3-point field-goal percentage	FT%	Free-throw percentage
RPG	Rebounds per game	APG	Assists per game	SPG	Steals per game
BPG	Blocks per game	PPG	Points per game

=== Regular season ===
Washington Wizards statistics
Player	GP	GS	MPG	FG%	3P%	FT%	RPG	APG	SPG	BPG	PPG
Marcin Gortat	82	82	31.2	.579	.000	.648	10.4	1.5	.5	.7	10.8
Otto Porter Jr.	80	80	32.6	.516	.434	.832	6.4	1.5	1.5	.5	13.4
Kelly Oubre Jr.	79	5	20.3	.421	.287	.758	3.3	.6	.7	.2	6.3
John Wall	78	78	36.4	.451	.327	.801	4.2	10.7	2.0	.6	23.1
Bradley Beal	77	77	34.9	.482	.404	.825	3.1	3.5	1.1	.3	23.1
Markieff Morris	76	76	31.2	.457	.362	.837	6.5	1.7	1.1	.6	14.0
Jason Smith	74	3	14.4	.529	.474	.686	3.5	.5	.3	.7	5.7
Tomáš Satoranský	57	3	12.6	.415	.243	.697	1.5	1.6	.5	.1	2.7
Trey Burke	57	0	12.3	.455	.443	.759	.8	1.8	.2	.1	5.0
Marcus Thornton	33	1	17.4	.400	.350	.852	2.3	1.2	.6	.1	6.6
Ian Mahinmi	31	0	17.9	.586		.573	4.8	.6	1.1	.8	5.6
Sheldon Mac	30	3	9.6	.400	.233	.852	1.1	.5	.3	.1	3.0
Andrew Nicholson^{†}	28	0	8.3	.390	.188	.583	1.2	.3	.4	.2	2.5
Bojan Bogdanović^{†}	26	0	23.1	.457	.391	.934	3.1	.8	.4	.2	12.7
Brandon Jennings^{†}	23	2	16.3	.274	.212	.706	1.9	4.7	.7	.0	3.5
Daniel Ochefu	19	0	3.9	.444		.000	1.2	.2	.1	.0	1.3
Chris McCullough^{†}	2	0	4.0	.000	.000	.500	1.0	.0	.5	.0	.5
Danuel House Jr.	1	0	1.0				1.0	.0	.0	.0	.0

=== Playoffs ===
Washington Wizards statistics
Player	GP	GS	MPG	FG%	3P%	FT%	RPG	APG	SPG	BPG	PPG
John Wall	13	13	39.0	.452	.344	.839	3.7	10.3	1.7	1.2	27.2
Bradley Beal	13	13	38.8	.471	.287	.820	3.4	2.7	1.6	.6	24.8
Otto Porter Jr.	13	13	32.9	.532	.282	.886	6.9	1.8	1.6	.5	12.2
Marcin Gortat	13	13	31.5	.505		.611	11.0	1.8	.4	1.5	8.1
Markieff Morris	13	13	28.7	.407	.368	.806	6.4	1.7	.9	1.3	12.1
Bojan Bogdanović	13	0	20.3	.414	.356	.844	4.3	.7	.5	.1	8.8
Brandon Jennings	13	0	13.7	.389	.154	.875	1.5	1.8	.2	.0	2.8
Jason Smith	13	0	12.1	.487	.300	.714	2.2	.3	.2	.5	3.9
Kelly Oubre Jr.	12	0	15.3	.426	.367	.700	2.3	.3	.8	.4	5.8
Tomáš Satoranský	10	0	3.6	.500		.400	.5	.6	.1	.0	.8
Sheldon Mac	7	0	2.4	.556	.400	1.000	.3	.0	.0	.0	2.0
Ian Mahinmi	5	0	12.6	.556		.364	2.2	1.2	.2	1.2	2.8
Daniel Ochefu	4	0	1.3	.000			.3	.0	.0	.0	.0
Trey Burke	3	0	6.7	.000	.000		.0	1.7	.0	.0	.0

- ^{†} Denotes player spent time with another team in the season. Stats reflect time with the Wizards only.

== Transactions ==
=== Trades ===
July 7, 2016	To Washington Wizards Trey Burke	To Utah Jazz Second-round pick in the 2021 NBA draft
February 22, 2017	To Washington Wizards Bojan Bogdanović; Chris McCullough	To Brooklyn Nets Andrew Nicholson; Marcus Thornton; First-round pick in the 2017 NBA draft

=== Free agents ===
==== Re-signed ====
Player	Date Signed	Contract	Ref.
Marcus Thornton	July 22, 2016	1 year, $1,315,448	
Bradley Beal	July 26, 2016	5 years, $127 Million	

==== Additions ====
Player	Date Signed	Contract	Former Team	Ref.
Ian Mahinmi	July 7, 2016	4 years, $64 Million	Indiana Pacers	
Andrew Nicholson	July 7, 2016	4 years, $26 Million	Orlando Magic	
Daniel Ochefu	July 7, 2016	3 years, $2.5 Million ($50,000 guaranteed)	Villanova Wildcats (Note: Player signed as an Undrafted Free Agent (UDFA) out of college)	
Jason Smith	July 7, 2016	3 years, $15,675,000	Orlando Magic	
Tomáš Satoranský	July 21, 2016	3 years, $9 Million	FC Barcelona Lassa (Spain) (Note: Drafted by the Wizards with the second-round pick in the 2012 NBA draft, only signed by the team this year)	
Sheldon McClellan	July 24, 2016	2 years, $1,448,720 ($50,000 guaranteed)	Miami Hurricanes	
Danuel House	July 26, 2016	2 years, $1,448,720 ($100,000 guaranteed)	Texas A&M Aggies	
Brandon Jennings	March 1, 2017	1 year, $1,200,000	New York Knicks	

==== Subtractions ====
Player	Reason Left	Date Left	New Team	Ref.
Drew Gooden	Waived	July 7, 2016	Los Angeles Clippers	
Ramon Sessions	Free Agency	July 7, 2016	Charlotte Hornets	
Jared Dudley	Free Agency	July 9, 2016	Phoenix Suns	
Garrett Temple	Free Agency	July 9, 2016	Sacramento Kings	
Nenê	Free Agency	July 19, 2016	Houston Rockets	
Alan Anderson	Free Agency	August 2, 2016	Los Angeles Clippers	
J.J. Hickson	Free Agency	August 20, 2016	Fujian Sturgeons (China)	
Jarrell Eddie	Waived	October 21, 2016	Austin Spurs	
Danuel House	Waived	March 1, 2017		

== Awards ==
Recipient	Award	Date awarded	Ref.
Scott Brooks	Eastern Conference Coach of the Month (January)	February 1, 2017	
