= Kelly Oubre Jr. =

American basketball player (born 1995)

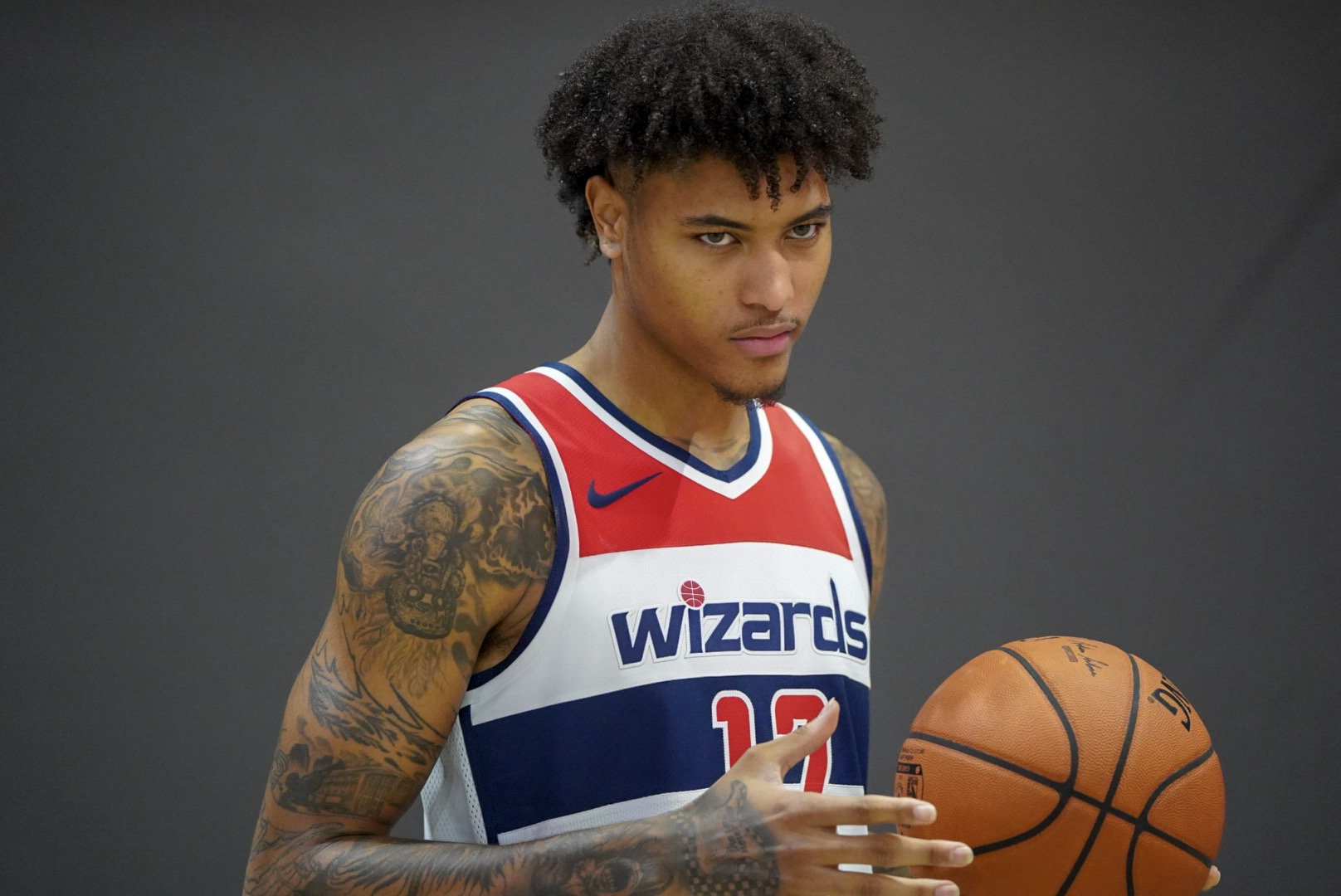
- Oubre Jr. with the Washington Wizards in 2016

No. 10 – Indiana Pacers
- Position: Shooting guard / small forward
- League: NBA

Personal information
- Born: December 9, 1995 (age 30) New Orleans, Louisiana, U.S.
- Listed height: 6 ft 7 in (2.01 m)
- Listed weight: 210 lb (95 kg)

Career information
- High school: George Bush (Fort Bend, Texas); Findlay Prep (Henderson, Nevada)
- College: Kansas (2014–2015)
- NBA draft: 2015: 1st round, 15th overall pick
- Drafted by: Atlanta Hawks
- Playing career: 2015–present

Career history
- 2015–2018: Washington Wizards
- 2018–2020: Phoenix Suns
- 2020–2021: Golden State Warriors
- 2021–2023: Charlotte Hornets
- 2023–2026: Philadelphia 76ers
- 2026–present: Indiana Pacers

Career highlights
- Big 12 All-Newcomer Team (2015); McDonald's All-American (2014); First-team Parade All-American (2014)
- Stats at NBA.com
- Stats at Basketball Reference

Kelly Paul Oubre Jr. (/ˈuːbreɪ/ OO-bray; born December 9, 1995) is an American professional basketball player for the Indiana Pacers of the National Basketball Association (NBA). Oubre played one season of college basketball for the University of Kansas before being selected by the Atlanta Hawks with the 15th overall pick in the 2015 NBA draft, who then traded him to the Washington Wizards. Oubre has also played for the Phoenix Suns, Golden State Warriors, Charlotte Hornets, and Philadelphia 76ers.

== Early life ==
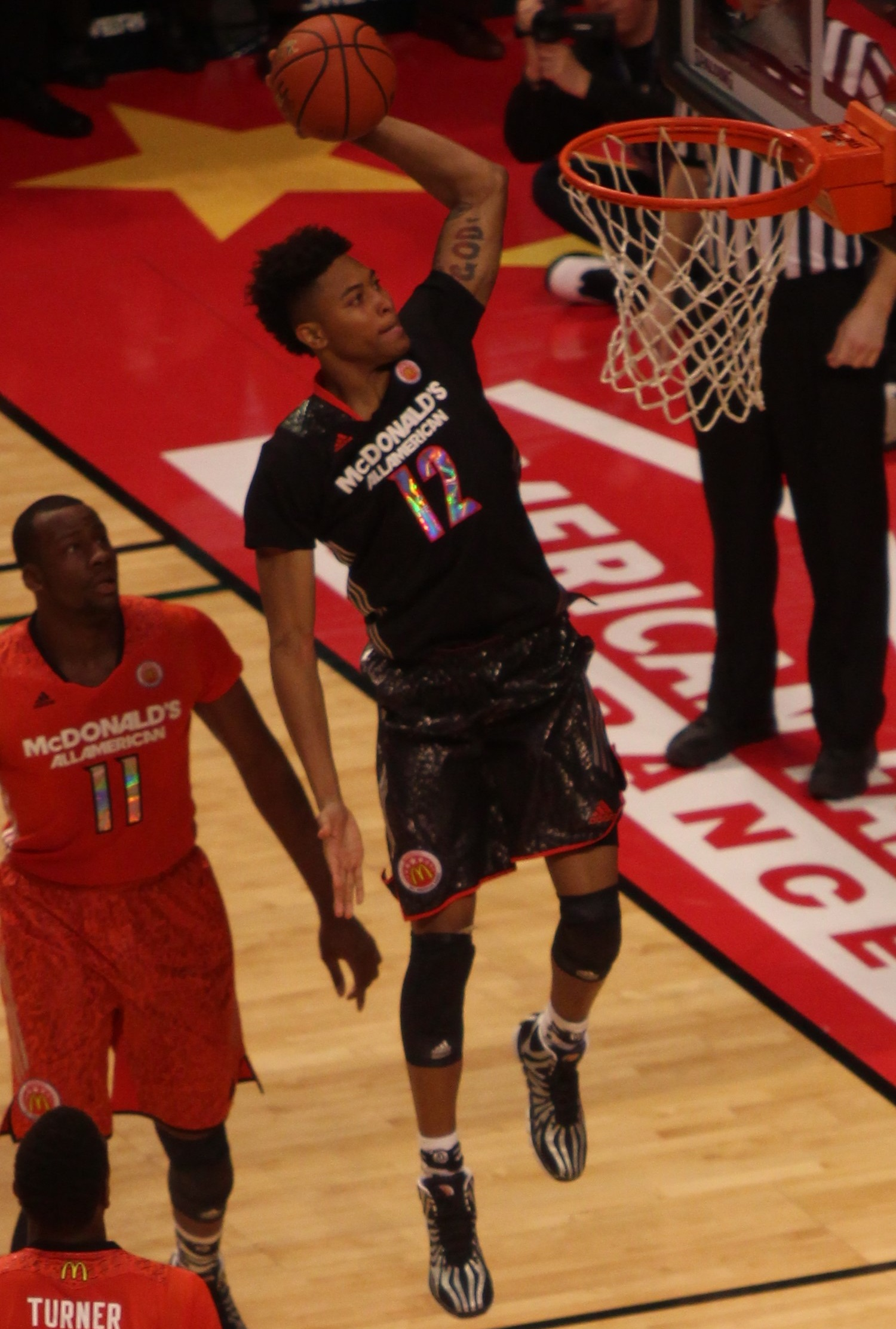
Oubre during the 2014 McDonald's All-American Boys Game

Oubre was the second child born in New Orleans, Louisiana, to Kelly Oubre Sr. and Tonya Coleman (formerly Oubre). Oubre and his family lived in the Magnolia public housing project from his birth until the early part of his childhood, later settling in the Eastover section of New Orleans. Oubre attended Edward Hynes Elementary School (now known as Hynes Charter School) and played for three Milne Boys Home (now known as New Orleans Recreation Development Commission) basketball teams during that time. Oubre's family moved to Richmond, Texas, after Hurricane Katrina in 2005. Oubre attended George Bush High School in Fort Bend, Texas, before transferring to Findlay Prep in Henderson, Nevada, for his senior season. In October 2013, Oubre committed to playing for the Kansas Jayhawks in 2014–15.

== College career ==
As a freshman at Kansas in 2014–15, Oubre was twice named Big 12 Newcomer of the Week and subsequently earned All-Newcomer Team honors. He also earned All-Big 12 Honorable Mention honors. In 36 games (27 starts) for the Jayhawks in 2014–15, Oubre averaged 9.3 points, 5.0 rebounds and 1.1 steals in 21.0 minutes per game.

On April 1, 2015, Oubre declared for the NBA draft, forgoing his final three years of college eligibility.

== Professional career ==
=== Washington Wizards (2015–2018) ===
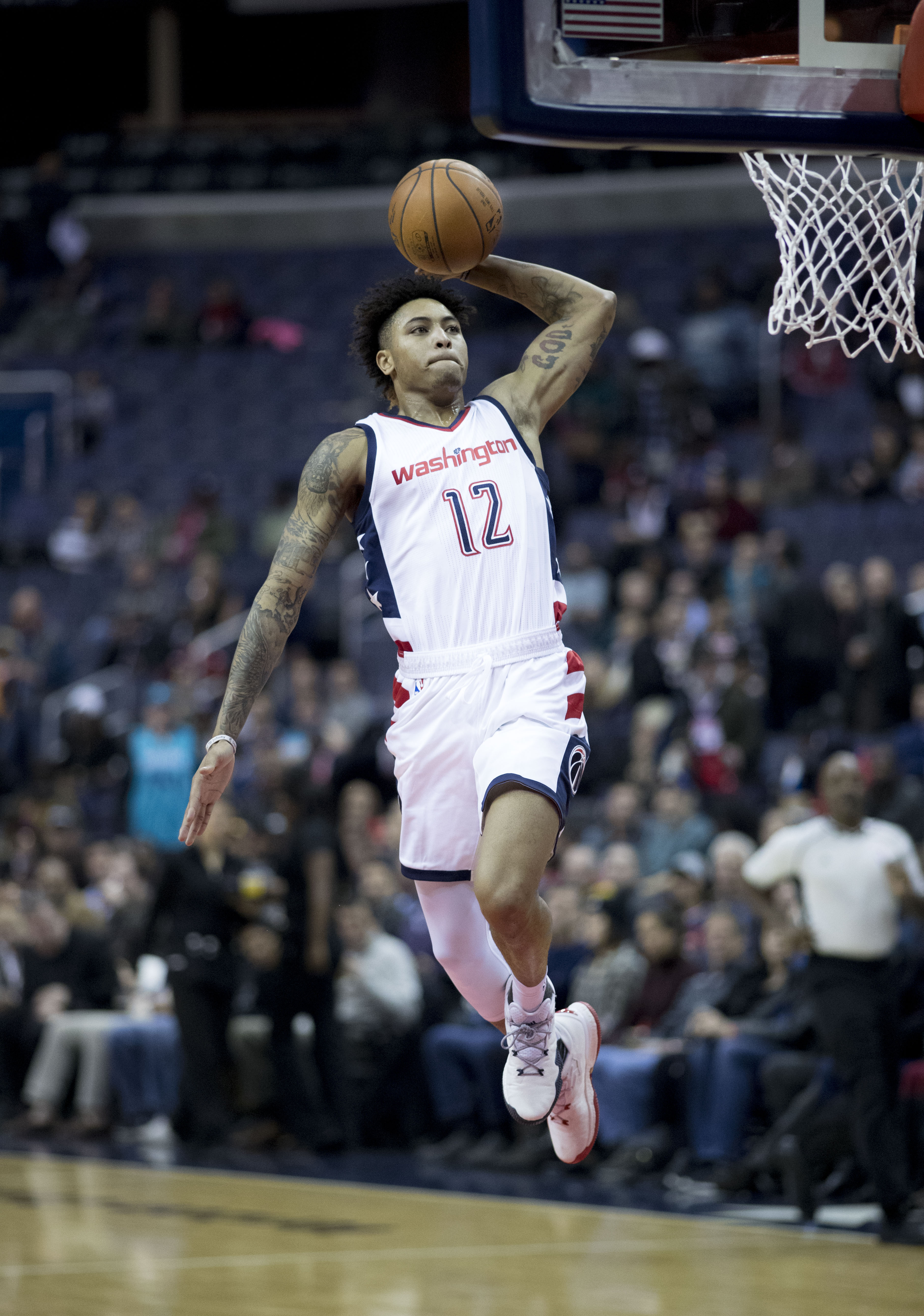
Oubre jumps for a slam dunk in 2016

Oubre was selected by the Atlanta Hawks with the 15th overall pick in the 2015 NBA draft. His draft rights were then traded to the Washington Wizards. On December 16, 2015, he scored a career-high 18 points on 6-of-15 shooting in a 114–95 loss to the San Antonio Spurs. Throughout his limited playing time during his rookie season, Oubre showed signs of becoming an effective "3 and D" player.

On November 28, 2016, Oubre recorded his first career double-double with 10 points and 10 rebounds in a 101–95 overtime win over the Sacramento Kings. On December 10, he scored a career-high 19 points to go with nine rebounds and three steals in Washington's 110–105 win over the Milwaukee Bucks. Oubre was suspended for game four of the Wizards' second-round playoff series against the Boston Celtics after he was ejected in game three for shoving Boston's Kelly Olynyk.

In 2017–18, Oubre scored over 20 points five times, including setting a career high with 26 points on January 19 in a 122–112 win over the Detroit Pistons. However, beginning the year shooting 44.9 percent from the field and 40.5 percent from the perimeter through 46 games, Oubre shot just 34.9 percent from the field and 27.4 percent from three in his last 35 games to close the regular season.

On December 10, 2018, Oubre scored a then season-high 23 points in a 109–101 loss to the Indiana Pacers.

=== Phoenix Suns (2018–2020) ===
On December 17, 2018, Oubre was traded with Austin Rivers to the Phoenix Suns for Trevor Ariza. He made his debut for the Suns two days later, scoring 13 points in a 111–103 win over the Boston Celtics. On January 8, 2019, Oubre matched his career high with 26 points in a 115–111 win over the Sacramento Kings. Four days later, he matched his career high with 26 points and tied his career best with 11 rebounds in a 102–93 win over the Denver Nuggets. On February 8, he recorded 25 points and a then career-high 12 rebounds in a 117–107 loss to the Golden State Warriors. On February 13, he scored a then career-high 28 points in a 134–107 loss to the Los Angeles Clippers. On March 16, he scored a career-high 32 points in a 138–136 overtime win over the New Orleans Pelicans. On March 21, he was ruled out for the rest of the season with a left thumb injury.

On July 16, 2019, Oubre signed a two-year, $30 million contract extension with the Phoenix Suns. On December 5, Oubre grabbed a career-high 15 rebounds alongside 14 points and four blocks in a 139–132 overtime win over the New Orleans Pelicans. Oubre matched his career-high for rebounds on December 28, scoring 20 points as well, in a 112–110 win over the Sacramento Kings. On January 12, 2020, Oubre matched his career-high of 15 rebounds for the third time in the 2019–20 season, scoring 25 points this time in a 100–92 win over the Charlotte Hornets. On February 7, Oubre scored a career-high 39 points in a 127–91 win over the Houston Rockets. Despite playing a full 38 minutes in a 131–111 win over the Utah Jazz on February 24, 2020, Oubre was ruled out the next day due to a right knee injury. The injury was later reported as a right meniscus tear. On March 3, 2020, Oubre underwent a successful arthroscopic surgery regarding the torn meniscus in his right knee and would be re-evaluated in four weeks.

=== Golden State Warriors (2020–2021) ===
On November 16, 2020, Oubre, along with Jalen Lecque, Ricky Rubio, Ty Jerome, and a 2022 first-round draft pick, was traded to the Oklahoma City Thunder for Abdel Nader and Chris Paul. On November 22, Oubre was traded to the Golden State Warriors in exchange for a conditional 2021 first-round pick and 2021 second-round pick. On December 22, 2020, Oubre made his Warriors debut, putting up six points and seven rebounds in a 125–99 loss to the Brooklyn Nets. On February 4, 2021, Oubre scored a career-high 40 points in a 147–116 win over the Dallas Mavericks.

=== Charlotte Hornets (2021–2023) ===
Oubre signed a 2-year, $25 million contract with the Charlotte Hornets on August 7, 2021. On October 20, he made his Hornets debut, scoring 14 points in a 123–122 win over the Indiana Pacers. On January 26, 2022, Oubre scored a season-high 39 points and a career-high 10 three-pointers in a 158–126 win over the Indiana Pacers.

On November 18, 2022, Oubre scored a season-high 34 points, alongside three rebounds and three steals, in a 132–122 overtime loss to the Cleveland Cavaliers. On December 29, he suffered a left hand injury in a 121–113 win over the Oklahoma City Thunder. On January 5, 2023, Oubre underwent surgery to address a torn ligament in his left hand and was ruled out indefinitely. He made his return to action on February 24, recording eight points and three rebounds in a 121–113 win over the Minnesota Timberwolves.

=== Philadelphia 76ers (2023–2026) ===
On September 26, 2023, Oubre signed a one-year, $2.9 million contract with the Philadelphia 76ers. On November 11, Oubre was struck by a car while walking near his Center City residence. He suffered a fractured rib along with injuries to his hip and right leg and was transported to the Thomas Jefferson University Hospital, being released from the hospital after the incident. At the time of the collision, Oubre averaged 16.3 points and 5.1 rebounds per game on 50 percent shooting in 29 minutes per game. 76ers teammate Tyrese Maxey would dedicate his 50 points he scored the following day to Oubre following the incident. Oubre missed the next 11 games before returning to play on December 6.

On March 29, 2024, Oubre was fined $50,000 for yelling at a referee following a missed call in the 108–107 loss on March 27 to the Los Angeles Clippers. He made 68 appearances (including 52 starts) for Philadelphia during the 2023–24 NBA season, averaging 15.4 points, 5.0 rebounds, and 1.5 assists.

On July 15, 2024, Oubre was re-signed by the Sixers on a two-year, $16.3 million extension. On December 30, Oubre put up 15 points, five rebounds, and a career-high eight steals in a 125–103 win over the Portland Trail Blazers. He made 60 appearances (starting 57) for the 76ers in the 2024–25 season, averaging 15.1 points, 6.1 rebounds, and 1.8 assists.

Oubre made 50 appearances (including 41 starts) for Philadelphia during the 2025–26 NBA season, logging averages of 14.1 points, 5.0 rebounds, and 1.6 assists.

=== Indiana Pacers (2026–present) ===
On July 8, 2026, Oubre signed a two-year, $17 million contract with the Indiana Pacers. On October 21, he made his Pacers debut, recording four points and three assists in a 123–120 win over the New Orleans Pelicans.

== Career statistics ==
Legend
GP	Games played	GS	Games started	MPG	Minutes per game
FG%	Field goal percentage	3P%	3-point field goal percentage	FT%	Free throw percentage
RPG	Rebounds per game	APG	Assists per game	SPG	Steals per game
BPG	Blocks per game	PPG	Points per game	**Bold**	Career high

=== NBA ===
==== Regular season ====
Year	Team	GP	GS	MPG	FG%	3P%	FT%	RPG	APG	SPG	BPG	PPG
2015–16	Washington	63	9	10.7	.427	.336	.633	2.1	.2	.3	.1	3.7
2016–17	Washington	79	5	20.3	.421	.287	.758	3.3	.6	.7	.2	6.3
2017–18	Washington	**81**	11	27.5	.403	.341	**.820**	4.5	1.2	1.0	.4	11.8
2018–19	Washington	29	7	26.0	.433	.311	.800	4.4	.7	.9	.7	12.9
2018–19	Phoenix	40	12	29.5	.453	.325	.761	4.9	1.6	1.4	**1.0**	16.9
2019–20	Phoenix	56	55	34.5	.452	.352	.780	**6.4**	1.5	1.3	.7	18.7
2020–21	Golden State	55	50	30.7	.439	.316	.695	6.0	1.3	1.0	.8	15.4
2021–22	Charlotte	76	13	26.3	.440	.345	.667	4.0	1.1	1.0	.4	15.0
2022–23	Charlotte	48	40	32.2	.431	.319	.760	5.2	1.1	1.4	.4	**20.3**
2023–24	Philadelphia	68	52	30.2	.441	.311	.750	5.0	1.5	1.1	.7	15.4
2024–25	Philadelphia	60	**57**	**34.6**	**.470**	.293	.751	6.1	**1.8**	**1.5**	.5	15.1
2025–26	Philadelphia	50	41	31.5	.467	**.360**	.766	5.0	1.6	1.4	.5	14.1
Career		705	352	27.4	.440	.327	.752	4.7	1.2	1.1	.5	13.3

==== Playoffs ====
Year	Team	GP	GS	MPG	FG%	3P%	FT%	RPG	APG	SPG	BPG	PPG
2017	Washington	**12**	0	15.4	.426	.367	.700	2.3	.3	.8	.4	5.8
2018	Washington	6	1	24.7	.375	.211	**.889**	3.8	.7	1.0	.5	9.3
2024	Philadelphia	6	6	**37.3**	**.484**	**.391**	.727	4.0	**1.7**	**1.8**	**1.2**	**13.2**
2026	Philadelphia	11	**11**	33.1	.453	.256	.815	**5.8**	1.1	.5	.5	11.6
Career		35	18	26.3	.441	.306	.803	4.0	.9	.9	.6	9.5

=== College ===
Year	Team	GP	GS	MPG	FG%	3P%	FT%	RPG	APG	SPG	BPG	PPG
2014–15	Kansas	36	27	21.0	.444	.358	.718	5.0	.8	1.1	.4	9.3

== Personal life ==
During his tenure with the Phoenix Suns, Oubre created a brand name of merchandise to help celebrate the community in Arizona and the team that he became a part of for the growth of their future. The "Valley Boyz" name that he came up with for this brand first originated as a hashtag by Oubre on January 9, 2019, as a location tag for the team on Instagram. Initial proceeds from the local sales in Phoenix's Uptown Plaza were given to his teammate Deandre Ayton as proceeds for hurricane relief efforts against Hurricane Dorian in the Bahamas through UNICEF. In addition to the Valley Boyz brand, Oubre also helped design and promote the team's "City Edition" jerseys for the 2020–21 season and 2021–22 season.

Oubre married Shylynn Oubre (née Gibson) in 2022. They have two children together: a daughter, born in 2021, and a son, born in 2024.

On November 11, 2023, Oubre was a pedestrian in center city Philadelphia and was struck by a hit and run driver. He was treated for a broken rib among various other injuries, and released from a local hospital.

In the early morning of April 23, 2024, Oubre was involved in a second automobile-related accident, disregarding a red light and subsequently striking another vehicle, though no injuries would result from the incident.
