= Trevor Booker =

American basketball player (born 1987)

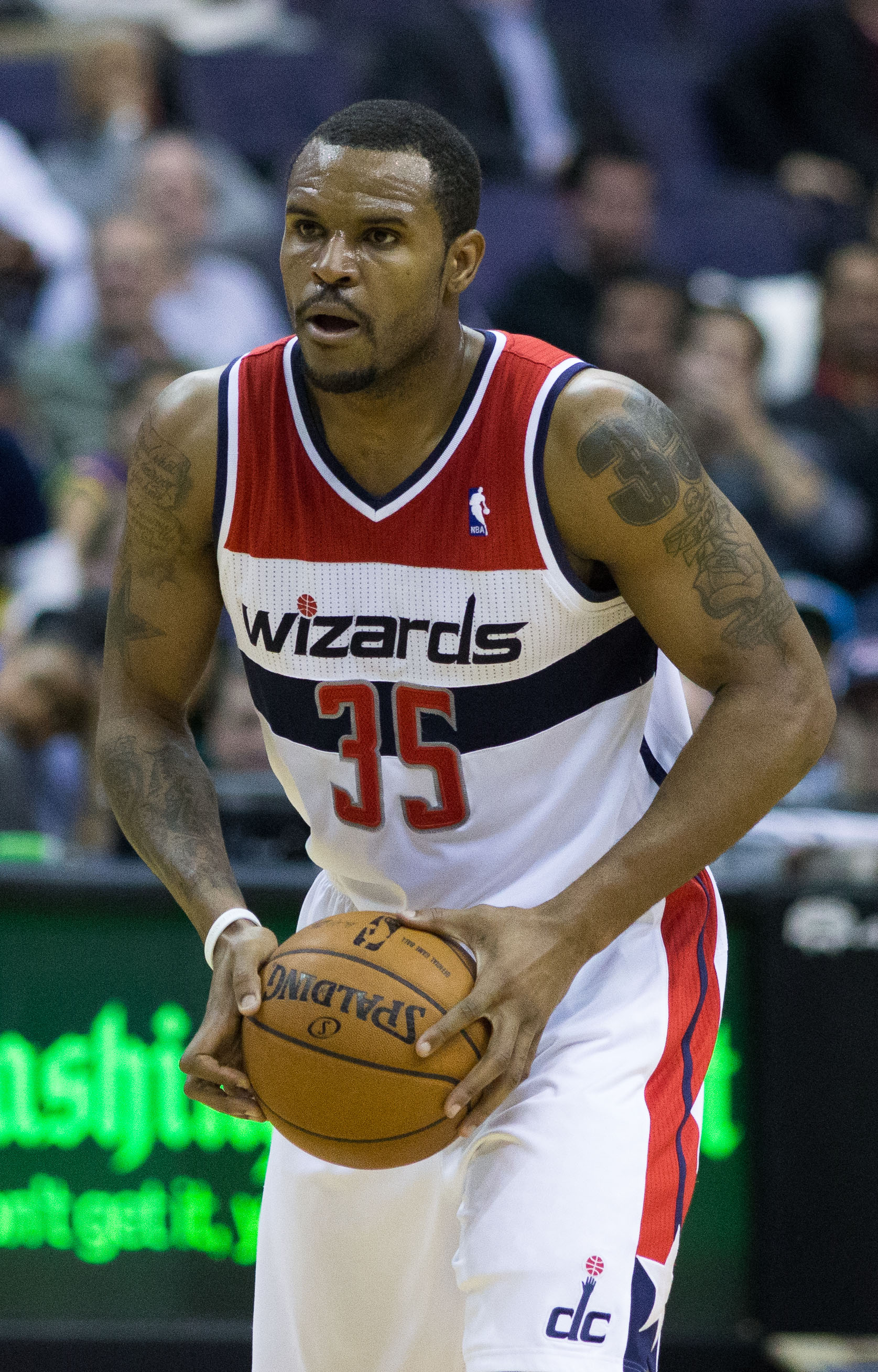
- Booker with the Wizards in 2013

Personal information
- Born: November 25, 1987 (age 38) Newberry, South Carolina, U.S.
- Listed height: 6 ft 8 in (2.03 m)
- Listed weight: 228 lb (103 kg)

Career information
- High school: Union (Union, South Carolina)
- College: Clemson (2006–2010)
- NBA draft: 2010: 1st round, 23rd overall pick
- Drafted by: Minnesota Timberwolves
- Playing career: 2010–2018
- Position: Power forward
- Number: 35, 33, 20

Career history
- 2010–2014: Washington Wizards
- 2014–2016: Utah Jazz
- 2016–2017: Brooklyn Nets
- 2017–2018: Philadelphia 76ers
- 2018: Indiana Pacers

Career highlights
- First-team All-ACC (2010); Second-team All-ACC (2009); ACC All-Defensive Team (2009)

Career statistics
- Points: 3,679 (6.9 ppg)
- Rebounds: 2,932 (5.5 rpg)
- Assists: 566 (1.1 apg)
- Stats at NBA.com
- Stats at Basketball Reference
Medals
Men's basketball
Representing United States
Summer Universiade
Bronze medal – third place	2009 Belgrade	Team

Trevor Fitzgerald Booker (born November 25, 1987) is an American former professional basketball player who played eight seasons in the National Basketball Association (NBA). He was drafted 23rd overall by the Minnesota Timberwolves in the 2010 NBA draft, but was immediately traded to the Washington Wizards. Booker primarily played the power forward position.

== Early life ==
Booker was born on November 25, 1987, in Newberry, South Carolina, to Gerald and Tracey, both accomplished athletes. He was brought up in a rural Whitmire neighborhood and grew up eating as many as 20 bowls of cereal each week, sharing the love with his brothers. Booker began playing the game of basketball after his mother tried to get her sons into it by showing them her highlights as a high school player. His brother, Devin, said, "She got us into it when we were younger, and we have been ever since."

== High school career ==
Booker attended Union High School in Union, South Carolina, and played basketball under head coach Joe Pitt. In his senior year in 2005–06, Booker was named Gatorade Player of the Year for South Carolina, after averaging 21.9 points, 16.4 rebounds, and 3.5 assists per game. He was also named AAA State Player of the Year and was a first-time All-State selection. Booker left the Union high school team as its all-time leader in rebounds and blocked shots. Later on, Booker played Amateur Athletic Union (AAU) basketball with the South Carolina Celtics.

== College career ==
=== Freshman ===
Entering college, Booker was listed as a three-star recruit by Rivals.com and 247Sports.com. He was ranked the 29th best power forward by Rivals and 27th by 247Sports in the Class of 2006. Booker was also given a 0.8778 composite rating at 247Sports.com. He committed to play for the Clemson Tigers men's basketball team on May 13, 2005, officially visited Clemson on September 16, 2005, signed the National Letter of Intent with Clemson on February 1, 2006, and enrolled on May 30, 2006. Booker also considered Auburn, Florida State, Georgia Tech, James Madison, Pittsburgh, Purdue, South Carolina, Tennessee, William & Mary, and Wofford as possible destinations. He received offers from Wofford, William & Mary, and South Carolina.

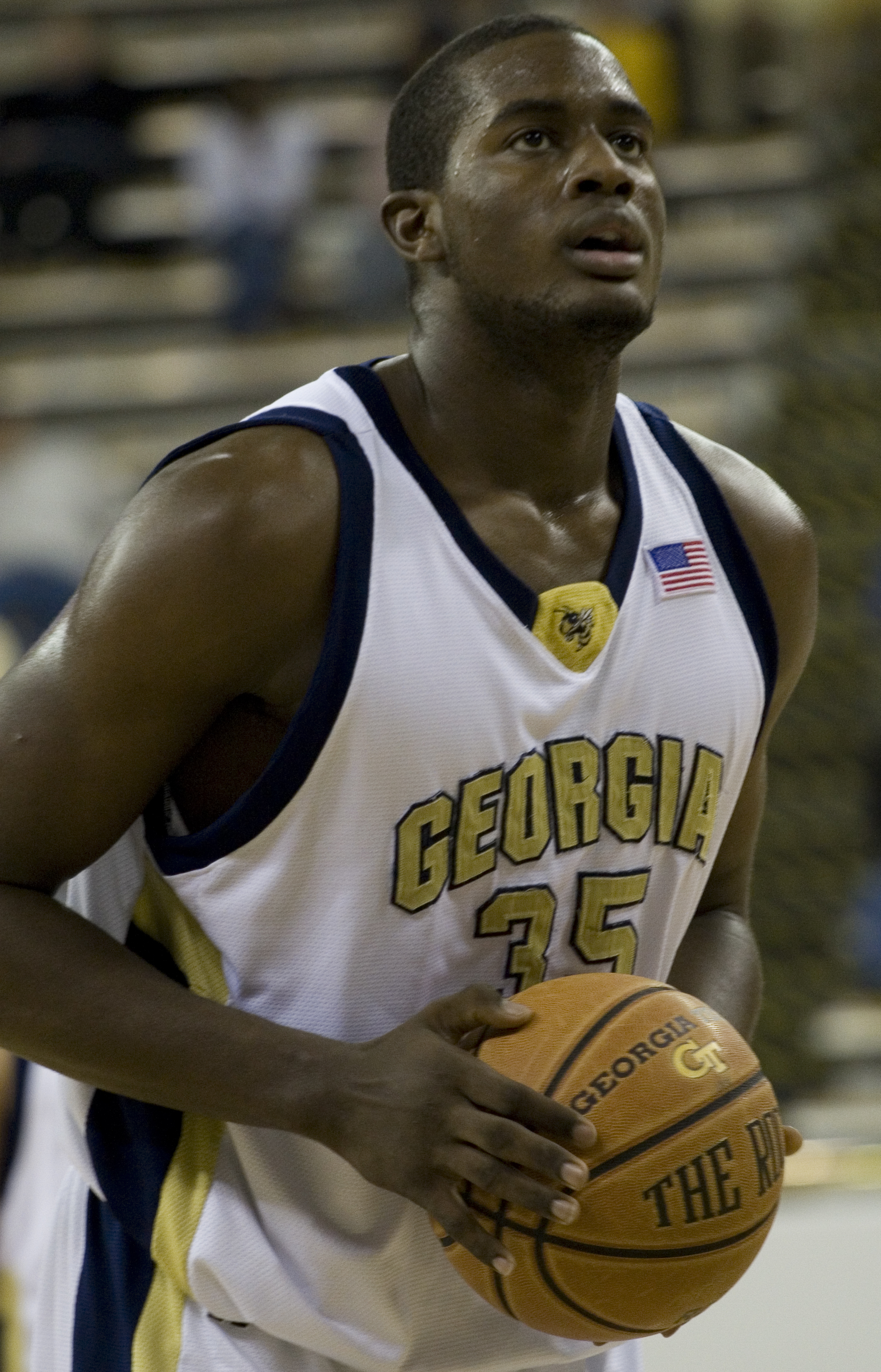
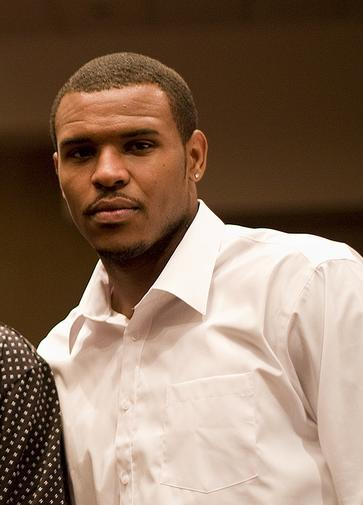
Georgia Tech's Zach Peacock scuffled with Booker as a freshman before being ejected from the game.

On October 31, 2006, Booker made his collegiate debut with Clemson, recording six points, seven rebounds, three blocks, and three steals as starting power forward in an exhibition game against Lithuania Academy. He was allowed 18 minutes on the court, and along with Sam Perry, led the team in rebounds. Booker made his first regular season appearance with the Tigers on November 10, 2006, in the first round of the Cox Communications Classic against Arkansas State. After starting as center, he became the first true freshman to start in that position for Clemson since Tom Wideman in 1995–96. He finished the game with 6 points, a team-high 7 rebounds, and 1 block in 19 minutes of playing time. On November 12, 2006, Booker grabbed a career-best 9 rebounds vs Old Dominion for the Cox Communications Classic title. He also contributed 10 points. On November 17, 2006, Booker scored a career-high 15 points in 20 minutes against Appalachian State. Booker recorded 11 rebounds on November 24 of the same year in a win over Charleston Southern. It was his first collegiate game with 10+ boards. On December 31, 2006, he recorded his first career double-double, with 15 points and 12 rebounds on Georgia State. James Mays, one of his teammates, when asked about Booker's accomplishments, said, "What didn't he do?" Booker helped Clemson reach 14–0, their best start in 20 years. On January 6, 2007, Booker had Georgia Tech freshman Zach Peacock ejected from the game after he hit him with an elbow. On March 19, 2007, Booker scored a career-high 21 points against Ole Miss. By the end of his freshman season, Booker averaged 10.4 points, a team-high 6.7 rebounds, and 2.2 blocks. He ranked fourth nationally among freshmen in shots blocked.

=== Sophomore and Junior ===
In his sophomore and junior seasons, Clemson had its first back-to-back NCAA appearances in nearly ten years. In Booker's junior year he led the ACC in rebounding (9.7 per game) and field goal percentage (.571), and finished second in blocked shots (2.0 per game). For his efforts, Booker was named second-team All-ACC and was named to the 2009 All-Defensive Team. On the National level, he was named USBWA All-District and NABC second team All-District. Following his junior year, Booker announced that he would return to Clemson for his senior year. He spent the summer following his junior campaign playing for Team USA in the World University Games, helping the team win a bronze medal.

=== Senior ===
During his senior year, Booker was selected the All-ACC first team.

== Professional career ==
=== Washington Wizards (2010–2014) ===
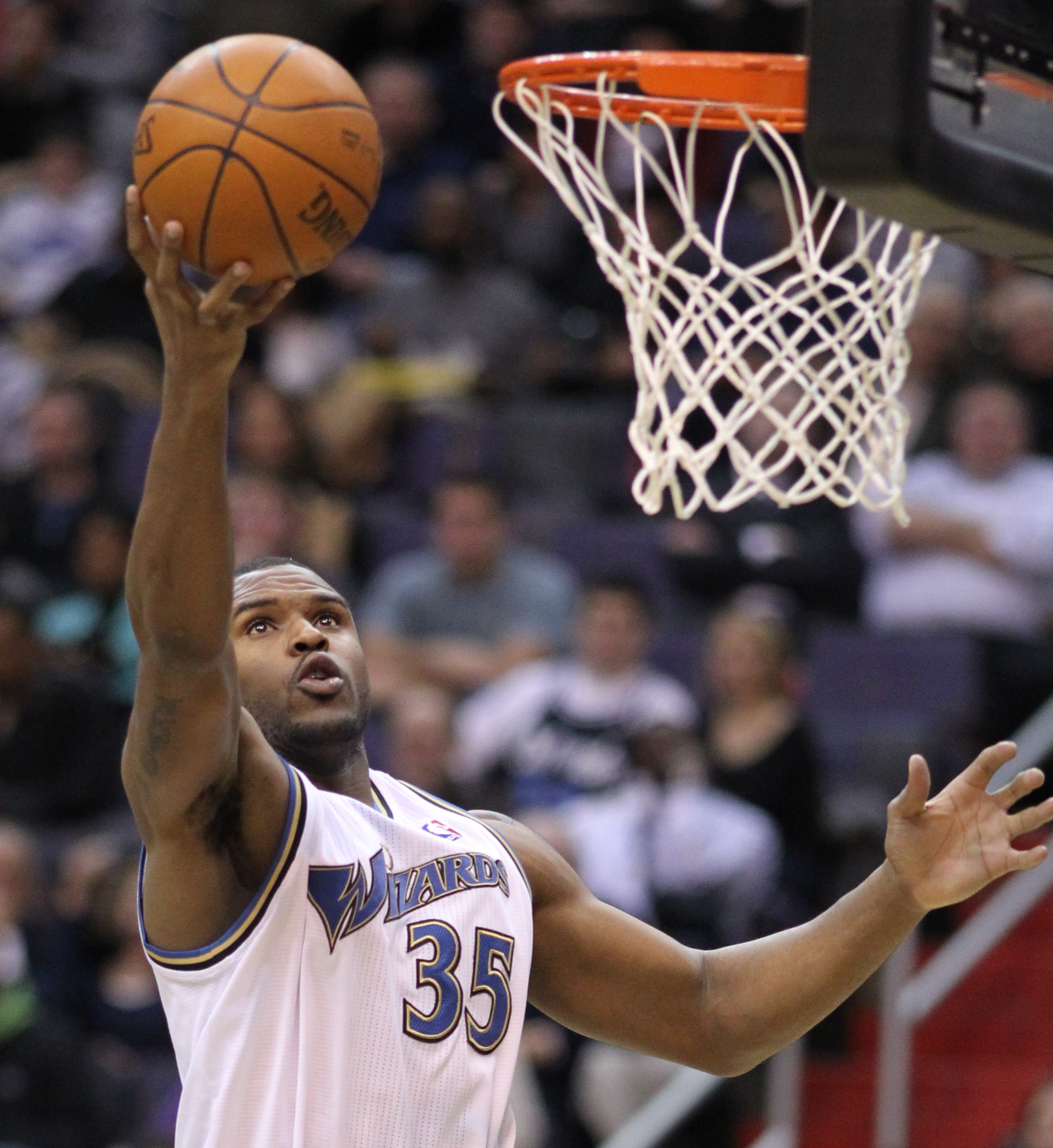
Booker in 2011

Booker was selected by the Minnesota Timberwolves with the 23rd overall pick in the 2010 NBA draft. His rights were later traded to the Washington Wizards on draft night.

On August 4, 2011, Booker signed with Bnei Hasharon of Israel for the duration of the NBA lockout. In October 2011, he returned to the United States due to a bruised right quadriceps. In December 2011, following the conclusion of the lockout, Booker returned to the Washington Wizards before appearing in a game for Bnei Hasharon.

=== Utah Jazz (2014–2016) ===
On July 21, 2014, Booker signed with the Utah Jazz to a reported two-year, $10 million contract. On April 11, 2015, Booker scored a career-high 36 points in a win over the Portland Trail Blazers.

=== Brooklyn Nets (2016–2017) ===
On July 8, 2016, Booker signed with the Brooklyn Nets. On December 14, he grabbed a season-high 18 rebounds in a 107–97 win over the Los Angeles Lakers. On April 1, 2017, Booker scored a season-high 23 points in a 121–111 win over the Orlando Magic.

=== Philadelphia 76ers (2017–2018) ===
On December 7, 2017, Booker was traded to the Philadelphia 76ers in exchange for Jahlil Okafor, Nik Stauskas, and a 2019 second-round pick. On February 28, 2018, he was waived by the 76ers.

=== Indiana Pacers (2018) ===
On March 3, 2018, Booker signed with the Indiana Pacers.

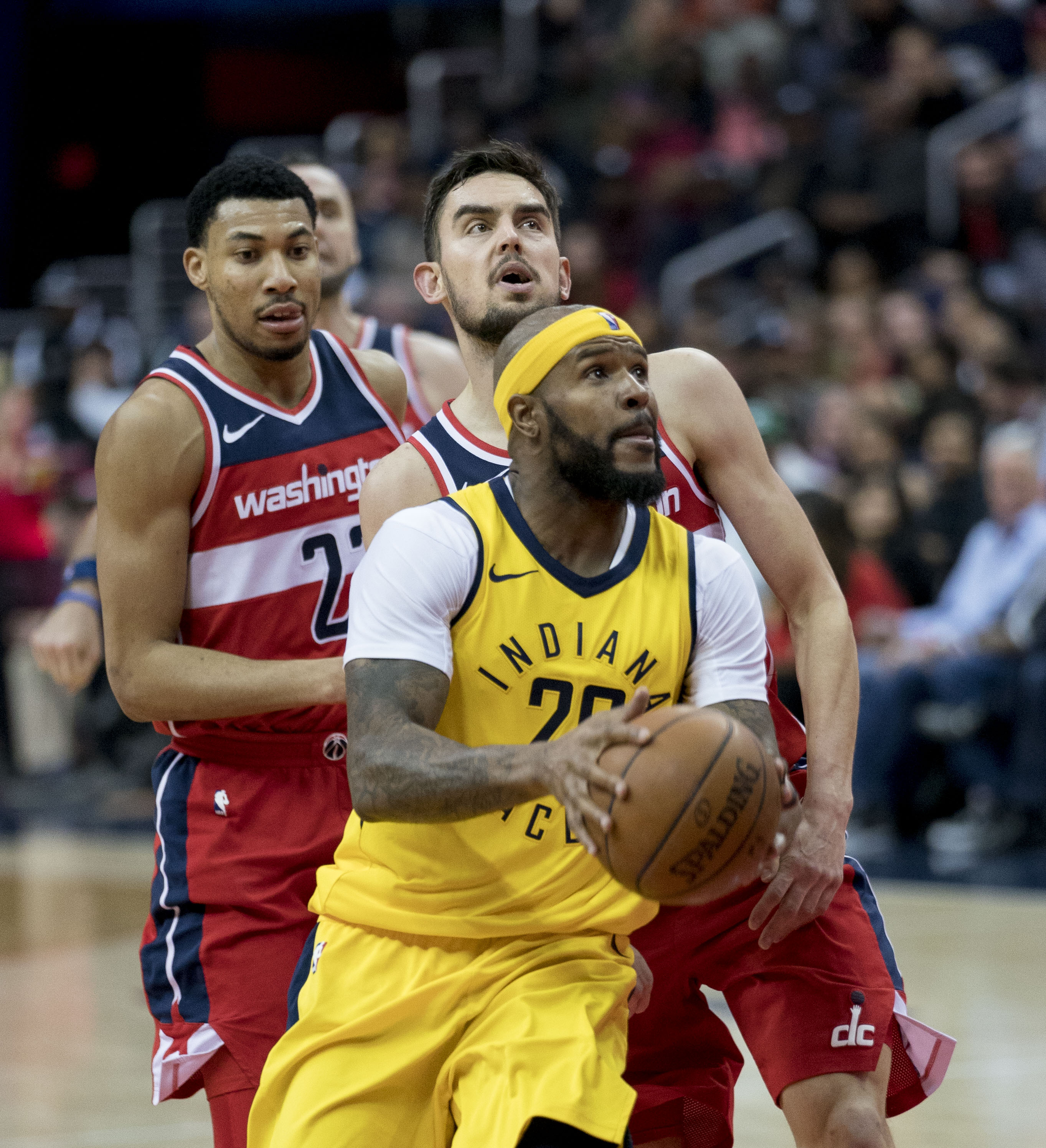
Booker with the Pacers in March 2018

In August 2018, Booker signed a one-year contract to play with the Shanxi Brave Dragons in the CBA. On October 11, 2018, Booker returned to the United States to have surgery performed on his foot.

On April 14, 2020, Booker announced his retirement from his basketball career at age 32.

Booker started working out with the minor league PrimeTime Players of the East Coast Basketball League and The Tournament fame. He made his ECBL debut on March 6, 2021, scoring 36 points and 18 rebounds.

== Career statistics ==
Legend
GP	Games played	GS	Games started	MPG	Minutes per game
FG%	Field goal percentage	3P%	3-point field goal percentage	FT%	Free throw percentage
RPG	Rebounds per game	APG	Assists per game	SPG	Steals per game
BPG	Blocks per game	PPG	Points per game	**Bold**	Career high

=== NBA ===
==== Regular season ====
Year	Team	GP	GS	MPG	FG%	3P%	FT%	RPG	APG	SPG	BPG	PPG
2010–11	Washington	65	14	16.4	.549	.000	.673	3.9	.5	.4	.6	5.3
2011–12	Washington	50	32	**25.2**	.531	**.500**	.602	6.5	.8	1.0	**.9**	8.4
2012–13	Washington	48	14	18.5	.491	.000	.556	5.0	.8	.7	.3	5.3
2013–14	Washington	72	**45**	21.6	.551	.000	.618	5.3	.9	.6	.6	6.8
2014–15	Utah	**79**	5	19.8	.487	.345	.581	5.0	1.1	.5	.5	7.2
2015–16	Utah	**79**	2	20.7	.490	.293	.670	5.7	1.1	.7	.5	5.9
2016–17	Brooklyn	71	43	24.7	.516	.321	.673	**8.0**	1.9	**1.1**	.4	10.0
2017–18	Brooklyn	18	6	21.9	.513	.250	.558	6.6	**2.1**	.4	.3	**10.1**
2017–18	Philadelphia	33	0	15.0	**.560**	.286	.821	3.7	.8	.5	.3	4.7
2017–18	Indiana	17	1	15.8	.464	.214	**.909**	4.5	1.0	.2	.3	5.4
Career		532	162	20.4	.515	.305	.636	5.5	1.1	.7	.5	6.9

==== Playoffs ====
Year	Team	GP	GS	MPG	FG%	3P%	FT%	RPG	APG	SPG	BPG	PPG
2014	Washington	**9**	**1**	**16.2**	.448	.000	.667	**4.3**	**.9**	**.2**	**1.0**	**3.3**
2018	Indiana	7	0	9.1	**.600**	.000	**.857**	2.6	.0	.1	.1	2.6
Career		16	1	13.1	.487	.000	.769	3.6	.5	.2	.6	3.0

=== College ===
Year	Team	GP	GS	MPG	FG%	3P%	FT%	RPG	APG	SPG	BPG	PPG
2006–07	Clemson	36	36	25.9	.602	—	.615	6.4	1.1	.9	2.2	10.4
2007–08	Clemson	34	34	26.6	.555	.333	.573	7.3	1.5	.6	1.9	11.0
2008–09	Clemson	32	32	30.7	.571	.409	.707	9.7	1.7	1.5	2.0	15.3
2009–10	Clemson	32	32	30.8	.521	.265	.591	8.4	2.5	1.3	1.4	15.2
Career		134	134	28.4	.559	.324	.624	7.9	1.7	1.1	1.9	12.9

== Personal life ==
Booker has three younger brothers; Devin, Darrion, and Jared. Devin also played college basketball for Clemson University and now plays professionally in Europe. Darrion played college basketball for the University of West Alabama, and Jared competes with the Union County High School basketball team. Booker is also the cousin of NBA player Jordan Hill.
