= Isaiah Whitehead =

American basketball player (born 1995)

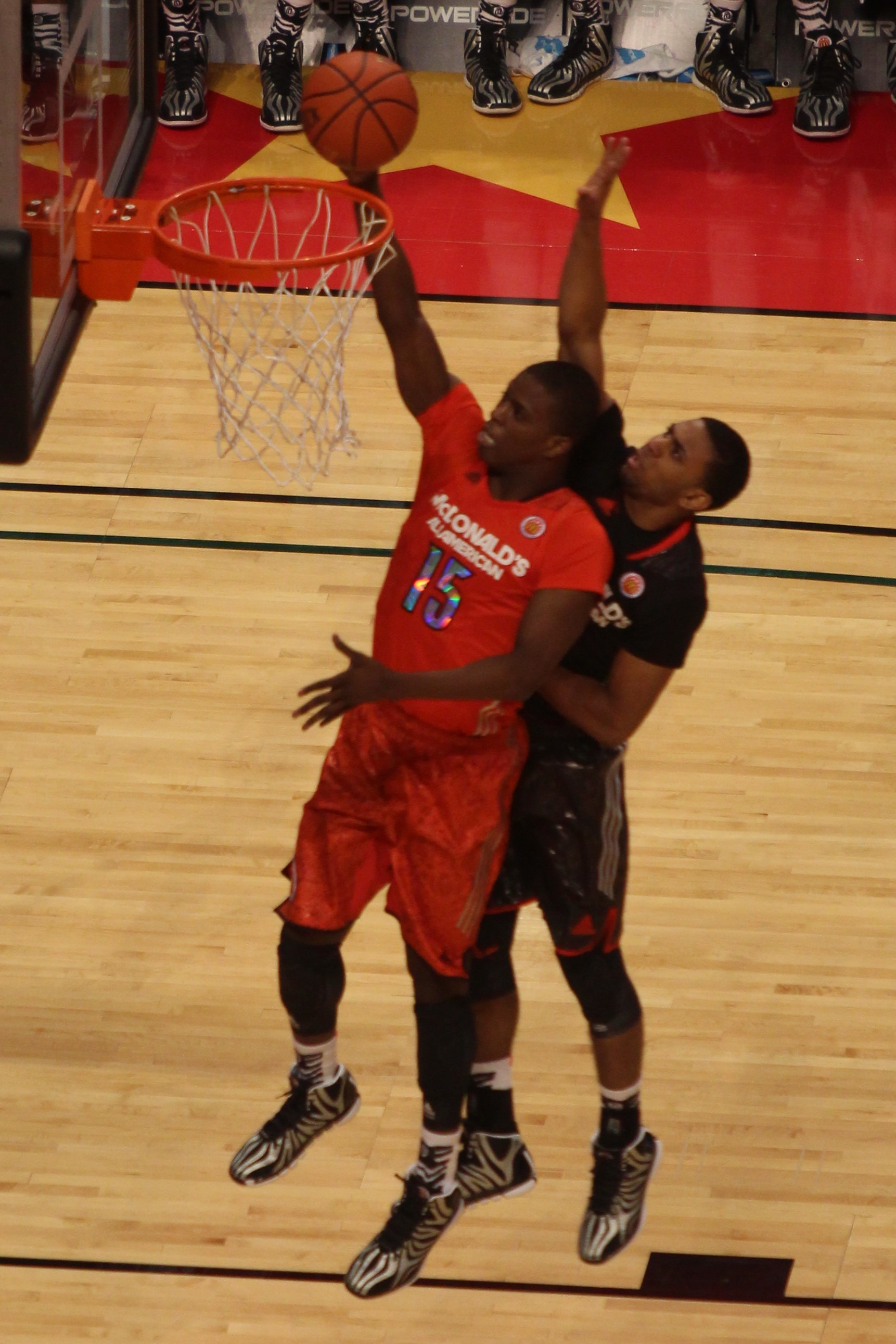
- Whitehead in the 2014 McDonald's All-American Game

Personal information
- Born: March 8, 1995 (age 31) Brooklyn, New York, U.S.
- Listed height: 6 ft 4 in (1.93 m)
- Listed weight: 213 lb (97 kg)

Career information
- High school: Abraham Lincoln (Brooklyn, New York)
- College: Seton Hall (2014–2016)
- NBA draft: 2016: 2nd round, 42nd overall pick
- Drafted by: Utah Jazz
- Playing career: 2016–2026
- Position: Shooting guard
- Number: 15

Career history
- 2016–2018: Brooklyn Nets
- 2017–2018: →Long Island Nets
- 2018–2019: Lokomotiv Kuban
- 2019: Grand Rapids Drive
- 2019: BC Astana
- 2020–2021: Mornar Bar
- 2021–2022: Beşiktaş
- 2022–2023: Riesen Ludwigsburg
- 2023: Beşiktaş
- 2023–2024: Ironi Ness Ziona
- 2024: Śląsk Wrocław
- 2024–2025: King Szczecin
- 2025–2026: Ironi Ness Ziona

Career highlights
- Kazakhstan League champion (2019); AP Honorable Mention All-American (2016); First-team All-Big East (2016); Big East All-Rookie team (2015); Big East tournament MOP (2016); Haggerty Award (2016); McDonald's All-American (2014); First-team Parade All-American (2014); Mr. New York Basketball (2014)

Career NBA statistics
- Points: 643 (7.2 ppg)
- Rebounds: 210 (2.4 rpg)
- Assists: 212 (2.4 apg)
- Stats at NBA.com
- Stats at Basketball Reference

Isaiah Whitehead (born March 8, 1995) is an American former professional basketball player. He played college basketball for Seton Hall, and was selected in the second round of the 2016 NBA draft. Whitehead played for the Brooklyn Nets in the National Basketball Association (NBA) between 2016–2018.

== High school career ==
Whitehead began his basketball career playing for Abraham Lincoln High School, and was recruited by a number of college programs. Whitehead played at the 2014 McDonald's All-American Boys Game, the 2014 Jordan Brand Classic, and other major tournaments in high school. He was labeled a five-star recruit by Rivals.com and 247Sports.com, being named Mr. New York Basketball, the recipient of the 2014 PSAL Wingate Award, Co-Most Valuable Player in the 2013 Under Armour Elite 24 game, and the highest-rated New York City recruit since 2009.

== College career ==
Whitehead was named preseason Big East Rookie of the Year and made the All-Rookie Team as a freshman. He was twice selected as Rookie of the Week on December 8 and December 15. He missed nine games during the season due to a stress fracture in his right foot.

At the conclusion of the 2015–16 regular season, Whitehead was unanimously selected to the All-Big East first team. He also received the Haggerty Award, given to the New York area's top men's Division I basketball player. Whitehead led Seton Hall to their first Big East Championship in 23 years. The Pirates took down Creighton, Xavier and Villanova in the final. Whitehead was awarded with the Tournament's Most Outstanding Player award. Next, the Hall earned their first NCAA berth in 10 years. Seton Hall was defeated by the Gonzaga Bulldogs in the first round in Denver.

In March 2016, Whitehead declared for the NBA draft, forgoing his final two years of college eligibility.

== Professional career ==
=== Brooklyn Nets (2016–2018) ===
On June 23, 2016, Whitehead was selected by the Utah Jazz with the 42nd overall pick in the 2016 NBA draft. He was later traded to his hometown team the Brooklyn Nets the following day. On July 8, 2016, he signed with the Nets and joined the team for the 2016 NBA Summer League. On January 6, 2017, Whitehead recorded his first career double-double with 10 points and 10 rebounds in 116–108 loss to the Cleveland Cavaliers. On March 10, 2017, he scored a career-high 24 points in a 105–96 loss to the Dallas Mavericks. On April 8, 2017, with one block against the Chicago Bulls, Whitehead tied an all-time team record by a guard in a single-season with 36, set by Darwin Cook during the 1980–81 season.

On November 27, 2017, Whitehead tied his career high with 24 points while shooting 10 of 16 from the field in a 117–103 loss to the Houston Rockets. During the 2017–18 season, he was assigned multiple times to the Long Island Nets of the NBA G League. He was traded to the Denver Nuggets and later waived.

In 30 games of the 2017–18 NBA G League season, Whitehead averaged 22.3 PPG, 3.7 RPG and 3.6 APG in 28.7 minutes per game.

=== Lokomotiv Kuban (2018–2019) ===
Whitehead signed with the Russian team Lokomotiv Kuban on August 6, 2018. He averaged 11.3 points, 2.4 rebounds, and 3.3 assists per game, while shooting 82% from the free throw line. On January 7, 2019, Whitehead agreed to part ways with Lokomotiv.

=== Grand Rapids Drive (2019) ===
On January 15, 2019, Whitehead signed with the Detroit Pistons on a two-way contract. He did not end up appearing in any games for the Pistons.

In four games of the 2018–19 NBA G League season, Whitehead has averaged 19.5 PPG, 4.5 RPG and 6.3 APG in 33.8 minutes per game.

On June 23, 2019, the Portland Trail Blazers signed Whitehead to their Summer League roster.

=== BC Astana (2019) ===
On October 10, 2019, Whitehead signed with BC Astana of the Kazakhstan Championship. In five games, he averaged 9.6 points, 3.4 rebounds and 2.8 assists per game.

=== Mornar Bar (2020–2021) ===
On January 25, 2020, Whitehead signed with Mornar Bar of the ABA League and Montenegrin League. He played five games before the season was suspended, scoring 24 points in his only Champions League appearance. On April 29, he extended his contract with the team.

=== Beşiktaş (2021–2022) ===
On August 27, 2021, Whitehead signed with Beşiktaş Icrypex of the Basketball Super League. He averaged 11.0 points, 3.3 rebounds, and 3.3 assists per game.

=== Riesen Ludwigsburg (2022–2023) ===
On September 23, 2022, he has signed with Riesen Ludwigsburg of the Basketball Bundesliga. Whitehead and Ludwigsburg parted ways on January 15, 2023, the contract was mutually cancelled.

=== Beşiktaş (2023) ===
On January 17, 2023, he signed with Beşiktaş Emlakjet of the Basketbol Süper Ligi (BSL).

=== Ironi Ness Ziona (2023–2024) ===
On August 22, 2023, he signed with Ironi Ness Ziona of the Israeli Basketball Premier League.

=== Śląsk Wrocław (2024) ===
On August 1, 2024, he signed with Śląsk Wrocław of the Polish Basketball League (PLK).

=== King Szczecin (2024–2025) ===
On November 6, 2024, he signed with King Szczecin of the Polish Basketball League (PLK).

On September 25, 2026, Whitehead announced his retirement via social media.

== NBA career statistics ==
Legend
GP	Games played	GS	Games started	MPG	Minutes per game
FG%	Field goal percentage	3P%	3-point field goal percentage	FT%	Free throw percentage
RPG	Rebounds per game	APG	Assists per game	SPG	Steals per game
BPG	Blocks per game	PPG	Points per game	**Bold**	Career high

=== Regular season ===
Year	Team	GP	GS	MPG	FG%	3P%	FT%	RPG	APG	SPG	BPG	PPG
2016–17	Brooklyn	**73**	**26**	**22.5**	**.402**	.295	**.805**	**2.5**	**2.6**	**.6**	**.5**	**7.4**
2017–18	Brooklyn	16	0	11.3	.465	**.389**	.684	1.6	1.3	.5	.1	6.3
Career		89	26	20.5	.411	.305	.788	2.4	2.4	.6	.4	7.2
