= Sean Kilpatrick =

American basketball player (born 1990)

Personal information
- Born: January 6, 1990 (age 36) Yonkers, New York, U.S.
- Listed height: 6 ft 4 in (1.93 m)
- Listed weight: 212 lb (96 kg)

Career information
- High school: White Plains (White Plains, New York); Notre Dame Prep (Fitchburg, Massachusetts)
- College: Cincinnati (2010–2014)
- NBA draft: 2014: undrafted
- Playing career: 2014–2022
- Position: Shooting guard
- Number: 1, 6, 9, 2, 0

Career history
- 2014–2015: Santa Cruz Warriors
- 2015: Delaware 87ers
- 2015: Minnesota Timberwolves
- 2015–2016: Delaware 87ers
- 2016: Denver Nuggets
- 2016–2017: Brooklyn Nets
- 2017–2018: Milwaukee Bucks
- 2018: Los Angeles Clippers
- 2018: Chicago Bulls
- 2019: Panathinaikos
- 2019–2020: Budućnost
- 2020: Tofaş
- 2020–2021: Gran Canaria
- 2021–2022: Hapoel Jerusalem
- 2022: Basket Zaragoza
- 2022: Fujian Sturgeons

Career highlights
- Greek Basket League champion (2019); Greek Basketball Cup winner (2019); All-NBA D-League Third Team (2016); NBA D-League All-Star (2016); Consensus second-team All-American (2014); First-team All-AAC (2014); 2× Second-team All-Big East (2012, 2013)
- Stats at NBA.com
- Stats at Basketball Reference

Sean Redell Kilpatrick (born January 6, 1990) is an American former professional basketball player. A 6'4" shooting guard born in Yonkers, New York, during his senior season of 2013–14 with the Cincinnati Bearcats, he was named AP first-team All-American.

== High school career ==
Kilpatrick starred at White Plains Senior High School, where he averaged 28.4 points, 7 rebounds and 6 assists per game over his four-year career. He then spent a post-graduate year at Notre Dame Preparatory School in Fitchburg, Massachusetts.

== College career ==
Kilpatrick redshirted what would have been his freshman season at Cincinnati in 2009–10, as he played the same position as top recruit Lance Stephenson.

In his first season with the Bearcats, Kilpatrick was part of the regular rotation, averaging 9.7 points per game in 20.6 minutes per game. As a sophomore, his role and minutes expanded and he increased his scoring average to 14.3 per game. He led the Big East Conference in made three-point shots and three-pointers per game and was named second team All-Conference at the conclusion of the season. As a junior in 2012–13, Kilpatrick again raised his scoring average as he tallied 17 points per game and repeated on the second team All-Big East squad.

In the summer between his junior and senior seasons, Kilpatrick was selected to represent the United States as a member of the men's national team at the 2013 Summer Universiade in Kazan, Russia. He averaged 7.5 points per game as the team finished ninth.

At the beginning of his senior season, Kilpatrick was named preseason first team all-conference by the American Athletic Conference. On February 19, 2014, Kilpatrick passed Steve Logan for second all-time in Bearcats scoring history (behind Oscar Robertson). On February 28, he was named one of the 10 semi-finalists for the Naismith College Player of the Year.

For the season, he averaged 20.6 points per game and led the Bearcats to a 27–7 overall record and first place in the conference. He was named first-team All-American by the AP, USA Today, The Sporting News, Sports Illustrated, Bleacher Report and NBCSports.com. Overall, Kilpatrick was named a consensus second-team All-American.

== Professional career ==
=== Santa Cruz Warriors (2014–2015) ===
After going undrafted in the 2014 NBA draft, Kilpatrick joined the Philadelphia 76ers for the 2014 NBA Summer League. On October 20, 2014, he signed with the Golden State Warriors, but was waived four days later. On November 3, he was acquired by the Santa Cruz Warriors of the NBA Development League as an affiliate player of Golden State.

=== Minnesota Timberwolves / Delaware 87ers (2015) ===
On January 21, 2015, Kilpatrick was traded to the Delaware 87ers, along with a first-round pick, in exchange for Ronald Roberts and the returning player rights to Darington Hobson.

On March 19, 2015, Kilpatrick signed a 10-day contract with the Minnesota Timberwolves. The Timberwolves were granted an NBA hardship exception for a 16th roster spot due to having four players out with injury. He made his NBA debut later that night, recording one rebound in 10 minutes of action as the Timberwolves defeated the New York Knicks 95–92 in overtime. He was not retained by the Timberwolves following the expiration of his 10-day contract on March 29. In four games for the Timberwolves, he averaged 5.5 points and 1.5 rebounds per game.

On March 29, 2015, Kilpatrick returned to the 87ers, where he played out the 2014–15 season. In 44 D-League games (22 for Santa Cruz, 22 for Delaware) over the course of the season, Kilpatrick averaged 13.9 points, 3.2 rebounds, 1.9 assists and 1.0 steals in 28.0 minutes per game.

=== Denver Nuggets / Return to the 87ers (2015–2016) ===
In July 2015, Kilpatrick joined the Milwaukee Bucks for the 2015 NBA Summer League. On September 10, 2015, he signed with the New Orleans Pelicans. However, he was later waived by the Pelicans on October 23 after appearing in five preseason games. On November 17, he was reacquired by the Delaware 87ers.

On January 12, 2016, Kilpatrick signed a 10-day contract with the Denver Nuggets. Three days later, he made his debut for the Nuggets in a loss to the Miami Heat. On January 23, he signed a second 10-day contract with the Nuggets. Two days later, he had his best game as a Nugget, recording 11 points and 3 rebounds in a loss to the Atlanta Hawks. After his second 10-day contract expired, he was not offered a contract with the Nuggets for the rest of the season, and on February 2, he was reacquired by Delaware. He went on to play for the East All-Star team in the 2016 NBA D-League All-Star Game. At the season's end, he was named to the All-NBA D-League Third Team.

=== Brooklyn Nets (2016–2017) ===
On February 28, 2016, Kilpatrick signed a 10-day contract with the Brooklyn Nets. On March 5, he scored a career-high 19 points in the Nets' 132–118 loss to the Minnesota Timberwolves. He went on to sign a second 10-day contract with the Nets on March 9, and tied his career high of 19 points on March 13 and March 15. On March 19, he signed a multi-year contract with the Nets. Three days later, he scored a career-high 25 points in a 105–100 loss to the Charlotte Hornets. On April 10, he set a new career high with 26 points in a 129–103 loss to the Indiana Pacers.

On October 28, 2016, Kilpatrick scored 18 points against the Indiana Pacers to record double figures in 21 of his first 25 games as a Net. On November 2, he recorded a season-high 24 points and a career-high 10 rebounds in a 109–101 win over the Detroit Pistons. On November 9, in his first career start, Kilpatrick scored in single figures for the first time in 2016–17, finishing with seven points, four rebounds and five assists in 28 minutes in a 110–96 loss to the New York Knicks. On November 29, he scored 31 of his career-high 38 points after the third quarter, as the Nets stopped a seven-game losing streak with a 127–122 double-overtime victory over the Los Angeles Clippers. He also had a career-best 14 rebounds in the game.

On December 7, 2017, following the trade in which Brooklyn acquired Jahlil Okafor and Nik Stauskas, the Nets waived Kilpatrick.

=== Milwaukee Bucks (2017–2018) ===
On December 18, 2017, Kilpatrick signed a two-way contract with the Milwaukee Bucks. On January 7, 2018, the Bucks converted his two-way contract to a standard NBA contract. On March 2, 2018, he was waived by the Bucks.

=== Los Angeles Clippers (2018) ===
On March 4, 2018, Kilpatrick signed a 10-day contract with the Los Angeles Clippers. On March 14, 2018, he signed a second 10-day contract with the Clippers. He parted ways with the Clippers following the expiration of his second 10-day contract.

=== Chicago Bulls (2018) ===
On March 26, 2018, Kilpatrick signed with the Chicago Bulls. On July 12, 2018, he was waived by the Bulls.

=== Panathinaikos (2019) ===
On January 9, 2019, Kilpatrick signed with the Greek EuroLeague club Panathinaikos. On February 10, he was named Greek League All-Star. On February 17, Kilpatrick won the Greek Basketball Cup after defeating PAOK 79–73 in the final at the Heraklion Indoor Sports Arena in Crete. This marked Kilpatrick's first trophy with the team and the 19th Greek Cup title for Panathinaikos. He later helped the Greens capture their 38th Greek League championship, sweeping Promitheas Patras 3–0 in the playoff finals. Over 19 GBL appearances, Kilpatrick averaged 8.4 points, 2.0 rebounds, 1.5 assists and 0.8 steals in 21.7 minutes per game.

=== Budućnost (2019–2020) ===
On November 18, 2019, Kilpatrick signed with Budućnost of the Adriatic League.

=== Tofaş (2020) ===
On July 20, 2020, Kilpatrick signed with Tofaş of the Basketbol Süper Ligi (BSL).

=== Gran Canaria (2020–2021) ===
On December 14, 2020, Kilpatrick signed with Herbalife Gran Canaria of the Spanish Liga ACB.

=== Hapoel Jerusalem (2021–2022) ===
On August 25, 2021, Kilpatrick signed with Hapoel Jerusalem of the Israeli Premier League.

=== Fuijan Sturgeons (2022) ===
On November 9, 2022, Kilpatrick signed with the Fujian Sturgeons of the Chinese Basketball Association (CBA).

== Career statistics ==
Legend
GP	Games played	GS	Games started	MPG	Minutes per game
FG%	Field goal percentage	3P%	3-point field goal percentage	FT%	Free throw percentage
RPG	Rebounds per game	APG	Assists per game	SPG	Steals per game
BPG	Blocks per game	PPG	Points per game	**Bold**	Career high

=== NBA ===
==== Regular season ====
Year	Team	GP	GS	MPG	FG%	3P%	FT%	RPG	APG	SPG	BPG	PPG
2014–15	Minnesota	4	0	18.0	.350	.308	**1.000**	1.5	1.0	**.8**	.0	5.5
2015–16	Denver	8	0	10.3	.381	.235	.875	.8	.4	.3	.0	3.4
2015–16	Brooklyn	23	0	23.2	**.462**	.361	.898	2.2	1.1	.4	.1	13.8
2016–17	Brooklyn	**70**	**24**	**25.1**	.415	.341	.843	**4.0**	**2.2**	.6	.1	13.1
2017–18	Brooklyn	16	0	11.4	.291	.262	.947	2.2	.9	.1	.1	4.9
2017–18	Milwaukee	23	0	8.9	.378	.283	.947	1.1	.7	.2	.0	4.0
2017–18	L.A. Clippers	4	0	9.5	.389	**.429**	**1.000**	.5	.8	.0	.0	4.8
2017–18	Chicago	9	1	23.8	.439	.396	.813	2.8	1.4	.7	**.3**	**15.4**
Career		157	25	19.6	.413	.335	.862	2.7	1.5	.5	.1	10.3

=== EuroLeague ===
Year	Team	GP	GS	MPG	FG%	3P%	FT%	RPG	APG	SPG	BPG	PPG	PIR
2018–19	Panathinaikos	15	14	21.1	.494	.333	.933	1.7	1.1	.9	.3	9.2	6.3
Career		15	14	21.1	.494	.333	.933	1.7	1.1	.9	.3	9.2	6.3
