= 2011–12 Washington Wizards season =

NBA professional basketball team season

- Head coach: Randy Wittman (starting January); Flip Saunders (Dec. - Jan.)
- Owners: Ted Leonsis
- Arena: Verizon Center

Results
- Record: 20–46 (.303)
- Place: Division: 4th (Southeast); Conference: 14th (Eastern)
- Playoff finish: Did not qualify
- Stats at Basketball Reference

Local media
- Television: CSN Mid-Atlantic, The CW Washington, TBD TV
- Radio: 106.7 The Fan

The 2011–12 Washington Wizards season was the 51st season of the franchise in the National Basketball Association (NBA), and the 39th in the Washington, D.C. area. The Wizards finished the lockout-shortened season with a 20–46 record and in 14th place in the Eastern Conference. It was the last season of Flip Saunders as Washington's head coach, who was fired after 17 games. For the 2011–12 season, the Wizards unveiled a new logo and color scheme, bringing back the "hands" logo used during the 90s when they were still called the Washington Bullets. They also changed their DC logo including the "hands" logo.

== Key dates ==
- June 23: The 2011 NBA draft took place in Newark, New Jersey.
- July 1: The free agency period begun.
- December 26: The Wizards begin the regular season with a loss against the New Jersey Nets at home.

== Draft picks ==
Round	Pick	Player	Position	Nationality	College
1	6	Jan Veselý	PF	Czech Republic	Partizan (Serbia)
1	18	Chris Singleton	SF	United States	Florida State (Jr.)
2	34	Shelvin Mack	PG/SG	United States	Butler (Jr.)

== Roster ==
2011–12 Washington Wizards roster
Players

Pos.	No.	Player	Height	Weight	DOB	From
F/C	7	Andray Blatche	6 ft 11 in (2.11 m)	260 lb (118 kg)	1986–08–22	South Kent HS (CT)
F	35	Trevor Booker	6 ft 8 in (2.03 m)	240 lb (109 kg)	1987–11–25	Clemson
F/C	43	Brian Cook	6 ft 9 in (2.06 m)	250 lb (113 kg)	1980–12–04	Illinois
G	15	Jordan Crawford	6 ft 4 in (1.93 m)	195 lb (88 kg)	1988–10–23	Xavier
G/F	6	Maurice Evans	6 ft 5 in (1.96 m)	220 lb (100 kg)	1978–08–11	Texas
F	9	Rashard Lewis	6 ft 10 in (2.08 m)	230 lb (104 kg)	1979–08–08	Alief Elsik HS (TX)
G	22	Shelvin Mack	6 ft 3 in (1.91 m)	207 lb (94 kg)	1990–04–22	Butler
G/F	20	Cartier Martin	6 ft 7 in (2.01 m)	220 lb (100 kg)	1984–11–20	Kansas State
C	42	Nenê	6 ft 11 in (2.11 m)	250 lb (113 kg)	1982–09–13	Brazil
F/C	13	Kevin Seraphin	6 ft 9 in (2.06 m)	275 lb (125 kg)	1989–12–07	France
F	31	Chris Singleton	6 ft 8 in (2.03 m)	230 lb (104 kg)	1989–11–21	Florida State
F	3	James Singleton	6 ft 8 in (2.03 m)	230 lb (104 kg)	1981–07–20	Murray State
F	24	Jan Veselý	6 ft 11 in (2.11 m)	240 lb (109 kg)	1990–04–24	Czech Republic
G	2	John Wall	6 ft 4 in (1.93 m)	195 lb (88 kg)	1990–09–06	Kentucky
G/F	21	Morris Almond	6 ft 6 in (1.98 m)	225 lb (102 kg)	1985–02–02	Rice

Coaches
Head coach
- Randy Wittman
Assistant(s)
- Don Zierden
- Sam Cassell
- Ryan Saunders
- Mike Wells
- Gene Banks

Legend
- (DP) Unsigned draft pick
- (FA) Free agent
- (S) Suspended
- (DL) On assignment to D-League affiliate
- Injured

Roster
Updated: 2012–04–16

=== Salaries ===
Player	2011–12 Salary
Rashard Lewis	$22,152,000
Andray Blatche	$6,442,083
John Wall	$5,530,080
Ronny Turiaf	$4,360,000
Nick Young	$3,695,857
Jan Vesely	$3,065,040
JaVale McGee	$2,462,399
Kevin Seraphin	$1,680,360
TOTAL	n/a

== Regular season ==
=== Standings ===
Southeast Division	W	L	PCT	GB	Home	Road	Div	GP
y-Miami Heat	46	20	.697	–	28–5	18–15	9–5	66
x-Atlanta Hawks	40	26	.606	6	23–10	17–16	11–3	66
x-Orlando Magic	37	29	.561	9	21–12	16–17	8–7	66
Washington Wizards	20	46	.303	26	11–22	9–24	7–7	66
Charlotte Bobcats	7	59	.106	39	4–29	3–30	1–14	66

Eastern Conference
#	Team	W	L	PCT	GB	GP
1	z-Chicago Bulls	50	16	.758	–	66
2	y-Miami Heat *	46	20	.697	4.0	66
3	x-Indiana Pacers *	42	24	.636	8.0	66
4	y-Boston Celtics	39	27	.591	11.0	66
5	x-Atlanta Hawks	40	26	.606	10.0	66
6	x-Orlando Magic	37	29	.561	13.0	66
7	x-New York Knicks	36	30	.545	14.0	66
8	x-Philadelphia 76ers	35	31	.530	15.0	66
9	Milwaukee Bucks	31	35	.470	19.0	66
10	Detroit Pistons	25	41	.379	25.0	66
11	Toronto Raptors	23	43	.348	27.0	66
12	New Jersey Nets	22	44	.333	28.0	66
13	Cleveland Cavaliers	21	45	.318	29.0	66
14	Washington Wizards	20	46	.303	30.0	66
15	Charlotte Bobcats	7	59	.106	43.0	66

=== Game log ===
2011–12 game log
Total: 20–46 (Home: 11–22; Road: 9–24)
December: 0–3 (home: 0–1; road: 0–2)

Game	Date	Team	Score	High points	High rebounds	High assists	Location Attendance	Record
1	December 26	New Jersey	L 84–90	Nick Young (16)	Andray Blatche (10)	John Wall (5)	Verizon Center; 17,102	0–1
2	December 28	@ Atlanta	L 83–101	Nick Young (21)	JaVale McGee (12)	John Wall (6)	Philips Arena; 17,750	0–2
3	December 30	@ Milwaukee	L 81–102	Jordan Crawford (24)	Andray Blatche (10)	John Wall (7)	Bradley Center; 17,065	0–3

January: 4–14 (home: 3–8; road: 1–6)

Game	Date	Team	Score	High points	High rebounds	High assists	Location Attendance	Record
4	January 1	Boston	L 86–94	John Wall (19)	JaVale McGee (14)	John Wall (11)	Verizon Center; 17,458	0–4
5	January 2	@ Boston	L 92–100	Andray Blatche (28)	JaVale McGee (14)	John Wall (8)	TD Garden; 18,624	0–5
6	January 4	@ Orlando	L 85–103	Nick Young (17)	Jordan Crawford (7)	John Wall (5)	Amway Center; 18,846	0–6
7	January 6	New York	L 96–99	Nick Young (24)	JaVale McGee (10)	John Wall (9)	Verizon Center; 16,998	0–7
8	January 8	Minnesota	L 72–93	Trevor Booker; Nick Young (14)	Andray Blatche; JaVale McGee (9)	John Wall (6)	Verizon Center; 13,095	0–8
9	January 10	Toronto	W 93–78	Nick Young; Rashard Lewis (15)	Chris Singleton (9)	John Wall (9)	Verizon Center; 14,077	1–8
10	January 11	@ Chicago	L 64–78	Jordan Crawford (14)	JaVale McGee (14)	John Wall (8)	United Center; 21,366	1–9
11	January 13	@ Philadelphia	L 89–120	Rashard Lewis (16)	Trevor Booker (6)	John Wall; Jordan Crawford (5)	Wells Fargo Center; 14,213	1–10
12	January 14	Philadelphia	L 90–103	Nick Young (27)	JaVale McGee (18)	John Wall (9)	Verizon Center; 13,998	1–11
13	January 16	Houston	L 106–114	John Wall (38)	Andray Blatche (12)	John Wall (8)	Verizon Center; 15,594	1–12
14	January 18	Oklahoma City	W 105–102	John Wall (25)	JaVale McGee (11)	John Wall (8)	Verizon Center; 15,075	2–12
15	January 20	Denver	L 104–108	Nick Young (25)	John Wall (9)	John Wall (10)	Verizon Center; 14,866	2–13
16	January 22	Boston	L 94–100	John Wall (27)	John Wall (10)	John Wall (7)	Verizon Center; 15,818	2–14
17	January 23	@ Philadelphia	L 83–103	Jordan Crawford (17)	Rashard Lewis; Kevin Seraphin (15)	John Wall (5)	Wells Fargo Center; 10,108	2–15
18	January 25	Charlotte	W 92–75	Nick Young (20)	JaVale McGee; Andray Blatche (10)	Jordan Crawford (5)	Verizon Center; 15,286	3–15
19	January 27	@ Houston	L 75–92	John Wall (17)	JaVale McGee (11)	John Wall (6)	Toyota Center; 13,894	3–16
20	January 28	@ Charlotte	W 102–99	JaVale McGee (22)	JaVale McGee (10)	John Wall (10)	Time Warner Cable Arena; 17,761	4–16
21	January 30	Chicago	L 88–98	John Wall (20)	JaVale McGee; Trevor Booker (9)	John Wall (6)	Verizon Center; 18,357	4–17

February: 3–11 (home: 1–5; road: 2–6)

Game	Date	Team	Score	High points	High rebounds	High assists	Location Attendance	Record
22	February 1	@ Orlando	L 103–109	Nick Young (24)	Trevor Booker (8)	John Wall (10)	Amway Center; 18,846	4–18
23	February 3	@ Toronto	L 89–106	Nick Young (21)	Trevor Booker (7)	John Wall (4)	Air Canada Centre; 16,382	4–19
24	February 4	L. A. Clippers	L 81–107	Nick Young; John Wall (14)	Kevin Seraphin (8)	John Wall (7)	Verizon Center; 19,419	4–20
25	February 6	Toronto	W 111–108	John Wall (31)	JaVale McGee; Kevin Seraphin (8)	John Wall (7)	Verizon Center; 14,687	5–20
26	February 8	New York	L 93–107	John Wall (29)	JaVale McGee (9)	John Wall (6)	Verizon Center; 17,376	5–21
27	February 10	Miami	L 89–106	JaVale McGee (24)	Trevor Booker (15)	John Wall (10)	Verizon Center; 20,282	5–22
28	February 12	@ Detroit	W 98–77	Nick Young; JaVale McGee (22)	JaVale McGee (11)	John Wall (15)	The Palace of Auburn Hills; 12,654	6–22
29	February 14	@ Portland	W 124–109	Nick Young (35)	JaVale McGee (11)	John Wall (9)	Rose Garden; 20,558	7–22
30	February 15	@ L. A. Clippers	L 84–102	John Wall; JaVale McGee (18)	Trevor Booker (8)	John Wall (12)	Staples Center; 19,135	7–23
31	February 17	@ Utah	L 100–114	John Wall (24)	JaVale McGee; Jordan Crawford (6)	John Wall (5)	EnergySolutions Arena; 18,719	7–24
32	February 20	@ Phoenix	L 88–104	Jordan Crawford (20)	JaVale McGee (9)	John Wall (6)	US Airways Center; 13,921	7–25
33	February 22	Sacramento	L 107–115	Jordan Crawford (32)	JaVale McGee (10)	John Wall (11)	Verizon Center; 17,085	7–26
34	February 28	@ Milwaukee	L 118–119	Trevor Booker (20)	Trevor Booker (11)	John Wall (15)	Bradley Center; 13,548	7–27
35	February 29	Orlando	L 95–102	John Wall (33)	Trevor Booker (13)	Jordan Crawford (5)	Verizon Center; 18,688	7–28

March: 5–11 (home: 3–5; road: 2–6)

Game	Date	Team	Score	High points	High rebounds	High assists	Location Attendance	Record
36	March 3	Cleveland	W 101–98	Jordan Crawford (31)	JaVale McGee (12)	John Wall; Andray Blatche; Shelvin Mack (5)	Verizon Center; 17,759	8–28
37	March 5	Golden State	L 100–120	Nick Young (25)	JaVale McGee (10)	John Wall (14)	Verizon Center; 17,843	8–29
38	March 7	L. A. Lakers	W 106–101	Nick Young (19)	Trevor Booker (17)	John Wall (9)	Verizon Center; 20,282	9–29
39	March 10	Portland	L 99–110	John Wall (25)	Trevor Booker (10)	John Wall (8)	Verizon Center; 18,071	9–30
40	March 12	@ San Antonio	L 97–112	JaVale McGee (21)	JaVale McGee (15)	Jordan Crawford; John Wall (5)	AT&T Center; 18,581	9–31
41	March 13	@ Dallas	L 98–107	Trevor Booker (20)	Trevor Booker (12)	John Wall (10)	American Airlines Center; 20,319	9–32
42	March 15	@ New Orleans	W 99–89	John Wall (26)	Kevin Seraphin (9)	John Wall (12)	New Orleans Arena; 14,256	10–32
43	March 16	@ Atlanta	L 88–102	Trevor Booker (18)	Trevor Booker (9)	John Wall (9)	Philips Arena; 15,241	10–33
44	March 18	@ Memphis	L 92–97	John Wall (25)	Kevin Seraphin (12)	John Wall (6)	FedExForum; 15,412	10–34
45	March 21	@ New Jersey	W 108–89	Jordan Crawford (23)	Nenê (10)	John Wall (8)	Prudential Center; 10,097	11–34
46	March 22	Indiana	L 83–85	Jordan Crawford (21)	Trevor Booker (7)	John Wall (9)	Verizon Center; 15,874	11–35
47	March 24	Atlanta	L 92–95	Nenê (21)	Trevor Booker (14)	Trevor Booker; John Wall (3)	Verizon Center; 18,588	11–36
48	March 25	@ Boston	L 76–88	Jordan Crawford (20)	Trevor Booker (12)	John Wall (9)	TD Garden; 18,624	11–37
49	March 26	Detroit	L 77–79	Jordan Crawford (20)	Nenê (9)	John Wall (9)	Verizon Center; 15,911	11–38
50	March 29	@ Indiana	L 89–93	Jordan Crawford (20)	Nenê (13)	Shelvin Mack (4)	Conseco Fieldhouse; 11,505	11–39
51	March 30	Philadelphia	W 97–76	Cartier Martin (20)	Jan Vesely (11)	John Wall (6)	Verizon Center; 18,066	12–39

April : 8–7 (home: 4–3; road: 4–4)

Game	Date	Team	Score	High points	High rebounds	High assists	Location Attendance	Record
52	April 1	@ Toronto	L 92–99	Jordan Crawford (18)	Chris Singleton (8)	John Wall (11)	Air Canada Centre; 16,858	12–40
53	April 2	Milwaukee	L 98–112	Jordan Crawford (23)	Jan Vesely (7)	John Wall (9)	Verizon Center; 16,234	12–41
54	April 4	Indiana	L 96–109	Jordan Crawford (28)	Kevin Seraphin (10)	Shelvin Mack (4)	Verizon Center; 14,561	12–42
55	April 5	@ Detroit	L 94–99	John Wall (28)	Kevin Seraphin (9)	John Wall (10)	The Palace of Auburn Hills; 12,681	12–43
56	April 6	@ New Jersey	L 98–110	John Wall (18)	Kevin Seraphin; James Singleton (9)	Shelvin Mack (8)	Prudential Center; 12,783	12–44
57	April 9	@ Charlotte	W 113–85	Jordan Crawford (20)	James Singleton (12)	John Wall (12)	Time Warner Cable Arena; 10,303	13–44
58	April 10	Orlando	W 93–85	Kevin Seraphin (24)	Kevin Seraphin (13)	John Wall (7)	Verizon Center; 15,355	14–44
59	April 13	@ New York	L 65–103	Jordan Crawford (17)	James Singleton (9)	John Wall (4)	Madison Square Garden; 19,763	14–45
60	April 14	Cleveland	L 89–98	John Wall (19)	Jan Vesely (11)	John Wall (9)	Verizon Center; 17,200	14–46
61	April 16	@ Chicago	W 87–84	Kevin Seraphin (21)	Kevin Seraphin (13)	Jordan Crawford (6)	United Center; 22,307	15–46
62	April 18	Milwaukee	W 121–112	Jordan Crawford (32)	Jan Vesely (10)	John Wall (10)	Verizon Center; 14,141	16–46
63	April 21	@ Miami	W 86–84	Cartier Martin (22)	Kevin Seraphin; Jordan Crawford; John Wall (6)	John Wall (13)	American Airlines Arena; 19,722	17–46
64	April 23	Charlotte	W 101–73	Nenê (18)	James Singleton (9)	John Wall (14)	Verizon Center; 17,355	18–46
65	April 25	@ Cleveland	W 96–85	John Wall (21)	Jan Vesely (12)	John Wall (13)	Quicken Loans Arena; 18,086	19–46
66	April 26	Miami	W 104–70	Maurice Evans (18)	Jan Vesely; James Singleton (8)	John Wall (12)	Verizon Center; 19,537	20–46

2011–12 season schedule

=== Regular season ===
Washington Wizards statistics
Player	GP	GS	MPG	FG%	3P%	FT%	RPG	APG	SPG	BPG	PPG
Morris Almond	4	0	16.8	.353	.333	.333	2.0	.5	1.8	.0	3.5
Andray Blatche	26	13	24.1	.380	.286	.673	5.8	1.1	.8	.7	8.5
Trevor Booker	50	32	25.2	.531	.500	.602	6.5	.8	1.0	.9	8.4
Brian Cook	16	0	9.7	.408	.217	.833	2.5	.5	.3	.1	3.1
Jordan Crawford	64	32	27.4	.400	.289	.793	2.6	3.0	.9	.1	14.7
Maurice Evans	24	0	14.3	.402	.378	.769	1.0	.4	.6	.0	4.9
Nenê Hilario	11	6	25.8	.607	.000	.657	7.5	1.7	.5	1.2	14.5
Rashard Lewis	28	15	26.0	.385	.239	.838	3.9	1.0	.8	.4	7.8
Shelvin Mack	64	0	12.2	.400	.286	.712	1.4	2.0	.4	.0	3.6
Cartier Martin	17	2	23.0	.440	.387	.579	3.4	.6	.6	.1	9.3
Roger Mason ^{[a]}	52	0	13.4	.399	.383	.778	1.3	.9	.3	.1	5.5
JaVale McGee ^{[a]}	41	40	27.4	.535		.500	8.8	.6	.6	2.5	11.9
Hamady N'Diaye ^{[a]}	3	0	1.0	.000			.0	.0	.0	.0	.0
Kevin Seraphin	57	21	20.6	.531	.000	.671	4.9	.6	.3	1.3	7.9
Chris Singleton	66	51	21.7	.372	.346	.682	3.5	.7	1.1	.5	4.6
James Singleton	12	0	21.8	.547	.222	.933	6.8	1.3	.8	.7	8.2
Ronny Turiaf ^{[a]}	4	0	14.5	1.000			3.0	1.3	1.5	.8	1.5
Edwin Ubiles	4	0	13.0	.278	.200	1.000	2.5	.3	.3	.3	3.5
Jan Veselý	57	20	18.9	.537	.000	.532	4.4	.8	.7	.6	4.7
John Wall	66	66	36.2	.423	.071	.789	4.5	8.0	1.4	.9	16.3
Nick Young ^{[a]}	40	32	30.3	.406	.371	.862	2.4	1.2	.8	.3	16.6

- ^{a} Statistics with the Washington Wizards.

== Awards and milestones ==
- John Wall participated in the Rising Stars Challenge and in the Skills Challenge during the All-Star Weekend in Orlando.
- Rashard Lewis scored his 15,000th career point in a 98–77 win against the Detroit Pistons on February 12.

== Injuries and surgeries ==
- On April, Roger Mason, Jr. underwent surgery to repair a broken index finger in his left hand and was out for the remainder of the season.

== Player statistics ==
Legend
GP	Games played	GS	Games started	MPG	Minutes per game
FG%	Field-goal percentage	3P%	3-point field-goal percentage	FT%	Free-throw percentage
RPG	Rebounds per game	APG	Assists per game	SPG	Steals per game
BPG	Blocks per game	PPG	Points per game

=== Regular season ===
Washington Wizards statistics
Player	GP	GS	MPG	FG%	3P%	FT%	RPG	APG	SPG	BPG	PPG
John Wall	66	66	36.2	.423	.071	.789	4.5	8.0	1.4	.9	16.3
Chris Singleton	66	51	21.7	.372	.346	.682	3.5	.7	1.1	.5	4.6
Jordan Crawford	64	32	27.4	.400	.289	.793	2.6	3.0	.9	.1	14.7
Shelvin Mack	64	0	12.2	.400	.286	.712	1.4	2.0	.4	.0	3.6
Kevin Séraphin	57	21	20.6	.531	.000	.671	4.9	.6	.3	1.3	7.9
Jan Veselý	57	20	18.9	.537	.000	.532	4.4	.8	.7	.6	4.7
Roger Mason Jr.	52	0	13.4	.399	.383	.778	1.3	.9	.3	.1	5.5
Trevor Booker	50	32	25.2	.531	.500	.602	6.5	.8	1.0	.9	8.4
JaVale McGee^{†}	41	40	27.4	.535		.500	8.8	.6	.6	2.5	11.9
Nick Young^{†}	40	32	30.3	.406	.371	.862	2.4	1.2	.8	.3	16.6
Rashard Lewis	28	15	26.0	.385	.239	.838	3.9	1.0	.8	.4	7.8
Andray Blatche	26	13	24.1	.380	.286	.673	5.8	1.1	.8	.7	8.5
Maurice Evans	24	0	14.3	.402	.378	.769	1.0	.4	.6	.0	4.9
Cartier Martin	17	2	23.0	.440	.387	.579	3.4	.6	.6	.1	9.3
Brian Cook^{†}	16	0	9.7	.408	.217	.833	2.5	.5	.3	.1	3.1
James Singleton	12	0	21.8	.547	.222	.933	6.8	1.3	.8	.7	8.2
Nenê^{†}	11	6	25.8	.607	.000	.657	7.5	1.7	.5	1.2	14.5
Morris Almond	4	0	16.8	.353	.333	.333	2.0	.5	1.8	.0	3.5
Ronny Turiaf^{†}	4	0	14.5	1.000			3.0	1.3	1.5	.8	1.5
Edwin Ubiles	4	0	13.0	.278	.200	1.000	2.5	.3	.3	.3	3.5
Hamady N'Diaye	3	0	1.0	.000			.0	.0	.0	.0	.0

- ^{†} Denotes player spent time with another team in the season. Stats reflect time with the Wizards only.

== Transactions ==
=== Overview ===
Players Added

Via draft

- Shelvin Mack
- Chris Singleton
- Jan Veselý

Via free agency

- Morris Almond
- Roger Mason, Jr.

Via trade

- Ronny Turiaf
- Nenê
- Brian Cook

10-day contracts

- Edwin Ubiles
- Cartier Martin
- James Singleton
Players Lost

Via trade

- Nick Young
- JaVale McGee
- Ronny Turiaf

Via free agency

- Josh Howard
- Yi Jianlian

Waived

- Roger Mason, Jr.
- Hamady N'Diaye
- Larry Owens

=== Trades ===
December 10, 2011	To Washington Wizards Ronny Turiaf; Conditional 2013 second-round pick (from Knicks); Cash considerations (from Knicks); Conditional 2012 second-round pick (from Mavericks)	To Dallas Mavericks Andy Rautins; Future second-round pick (from Wizards) To New York Knicks Tyson Chandler (sign and trade); Draft rights to Ahmad Nivins (from Mavericks); Draft rights to Georgios Printezis (from Mavericks)
March 15, 2012	To Washington Wizards Nenê; Brian Cook; Conditional 2015 second-round pick (from Clippers)	To Denver Nuggets JaVale McGee; Ronny Turiaf; Future second-round pick (from Clippers) To Los Angeles Clippers Nick Young

=== Free agents ===
Additions
Player	Date signed	Former team
Roger Mason, Jr.	December 9	New York Knicks
Larry Owens	December 10	Re-signed
Hamady N'Diaye	December 11	Re-signed
Maurice Evans	December 16	Re-signed
Nick Young	December 19	Re-signed
Morris Almond	April 16	Maine Red Claws (D-League)

Subtractions
Player	Date signed	New team
Josh Howard	December 15	Utah Jazz
Yi Jianlian	January 6	Dallas Mavericks

Many players signed with teams from other leagues due to the 2011 NBA lockout. FIBA allows players under NBA contracts to sign and play for teams from other leagues if the contracts have opt-out clauses that allow the players to return to the NBA if the lockout ends. The Chinese Basketball Association, however, only allows its clubs to sign foreign free agents who could play for at least the entire season.

Played in other leagues during lockout
Player	Date signed	New team	Opt-out clause
Mustafa Shakur	June 27	Pau-Orthez (France)	No
Trevor Booker	August 4	Bnei HaSharon (Israel)	Yes
Kevin Seraphin	September 20	Caja Laboral (Spain)	Yes
Yi Jianlian	October 8	Guangdong Southern Tigers (China)	Yes
