= 2016–17 Brooklyn Nets season =

Season of National Basketball Association team the Brooklyn Nets

- Head coach: Kenny Atkinson
- General manager: Sean Marks
- Owners: Mikhail Prokhorov
- Arena: Barclays Center

Results
- Record: 20–62 (.244)
- Place: Division: 5th (Atlantic); Conference: 15th (Eastern)
- Playoff finish: Did not qualify
- Stats at Basketball Reference

Local media
- Television: YES Network, WPIX
- Radio: WFAN AM/FM

The 2016–17 Brooklyn Nets season was the 41st season of the franchise in the National Basketball Association (NBA), 50th season overall, and its fifth season playing in the New York City borough of Brooklyn.

The season marked Brook Lopez's final one with the Nets, as he was traded to the Los Angeles Lakers in the off-season. He became the franchise's all-time leading scorer on April 10 when he broke Buck Williams' record that stood for 28 years.

The Nets hired Kenny Atkinson after Lionel Hollins was fired during the middle of the previous season. General manager Billy King was also fired. Sean Marks took over as the Nets began rebuilding. They finished 20–62, their worst record since 2009–10. In the month of February, the Nets went 0–10 marking the first time that they lost every game in a single month since going 0–14 in November 2009.

== Key dates ==
- April 17: The Nets hire Kenny Atkinson as their head coach.

== Draft picks ==
Round	Pick	Player	Position	Nationality	College
2	55	Marcus Paige	Point guard	United States	North Carolina

== Roster ==
2016–17 Brooklyn Nets roster
Players

Pos.	No.	Player	Height	Weight	DOB	From
F	13	Quincy Acy	6 ft 7 in (2.01 m)	240 lb (109 kg)	1990-10-06	Baylor
F	35	Trevor Booker	6 ft 8 in (2.03 m)	228 lb (103 kg)	1987-11-25	Clemson
G	8	Spencer Dinwiddie	6 ft 6 in (1.98 m)	200 lb (91 kg)	1993-04-06	Colorado
G	2	Randy Foye	6 ft 4 in (1.93 m)	218 lb (99 kg)	1983-09-24	Villanova
G	10	Archie Goodwin	6 ft 5 in (1.96 m)	205 lb (93 kg)	1994-08-17	Kentucky
C	41	Justin Hamilton	7 ft 0 in (2.13 m)	255 lb (116 kg)	1990-04-01	LSU
G/F	12	Joe Harris (injured)	6 ft 6 in (1.98 m)	219 lb (99 kg)	1991-09-06	Virginia
F	24	Rondae Hollis-Jefferson	6 ft 7 in (2.01 m)	214 lb (97 kg)	1995-01-03	Arizona
G	6	Sean Kilpatrick	6 ft 4 in (1.93 m)	219 lb (99 kg)	1990-01-06	Cincinnati
G/F	22	Caris LeVert	6 ft 7 in (2.01 m)	203 lb (92 kg)	1994-08-25	Michigan
G	7	Jeremy Lin	6 ft 3 in (1.91 m)	200 lb (91 kg)	1988-08-23	Harvard
C	11	Brook Lopez	7 ft 0 in (2.13 m)	268 lb (122 kg)	1988-04-01	Stanford
G/F	14	K. J. McDaniels	6 ft 6 in (1.98 m)	205 lb (93 kg)	1993-02-09	Clemson
F	44	Andrew Nicholson	6 ft 9 in (2.06 m)	250 lb (113 kg)	1989-12-08	St. Bonaventure
G	15	Isaiah Whitehead	6 ft 4 in (1.93 m)	213 lb (97 kg)	1995-03-08	Seton Hall

Coaches
Head coach
- Kenny Atkinson
Assistant(s)
- Bret Brielmaier
- Chris Fleming
- Jacque Vaughn
- Michael Batiste (player development)
- Adam Harrington (player development)
- Jordan Ott (advanced scout)

Legend
- (DP) Unsigned draft pick
- (FA) Free agent
- (S) Suspended
- (DL) On assignment to D-League affiliate
- Injured

Roster
Updated: April 4, 2017

== Standings ==
=== Division ===
Atlantic Division	W	L	PCT	GB	Home	Road	Div	GP
c – Boston Celtics	53	29	.646	–	30‍–‍11	23‍–‍18	11–5	82
x – Toronto Raptors	51	31	.622	2.0	28‍–‍13	23‍–‍18	14–2	82
New York Knicks	31	51	.378	22.0	19‍–‍22	12‍–‍29	5–11	82
Philadelphia 76ers	28	54	.341	25.0	17‍–‍24	11‍–‍30	7–9	82
Brooklyn Nets	20	62	.244	33.0	13‍–‍28	7‍–‍34	3–13	82

=== Conference ===
Eastern Conference
#	Team	W	L	PCT	GB	GP
1	c – Boston Celtics *	53	29	.646	–	82
2	y – Cleveland Cavaliers *	51	31	.622	2.0	82
3	x – Toronto Raptors	51	31	.622	2.0	82
4	y – Washington Wizards *	49	33	.598	4.0	82
5	x – Atlanta Hawks	43	39	.524	10.0	82
6	x – Milwaukee Bucks	42	40	.512	11.0	82
7	x – Indiana Pacers	42	40	.512	11.0	82
8	x – Chicago Bulls	41	41	.500	12.0	82
9	Miami Heat	41	41	.500	12.0	82
10	Detroit Pistons	37	45	.451	16.0	82
11	Charlotte Hornets	36	46	.439	17.0	82
12	New York Knicks	31	51	.378	22.0	82
13	Orlando Magic	29	53	.354	24.0	82
14	Philadelphia 76ers	28	54	.341	25.0	82
15	Brooklyn Nets	20	62	.244	33.0	82

== Game log ==
=== Pre-season ===
2016 pre-season game log
Total: 1–5 (Home: 1–2; Road: 0–3)
Pre-season: 1–5 (home: 1–2; road: 0–3)

Game	Date	Team	Score	High points	High rebounds	High assists	Location Attendance	Record
1	October 6	Pistons	W 101–94	Jeremy Lin (21)	Trevor Booker (5)	Randy Foye (4)	Barclays Center; 8,782	1–0
2	October 8	@ Knicks	L 98–116	Anthony Bennett (15)	Hamilton, McCullough (7)	Yogi Ferrell (3)	Madison Square Garden; 19,601	1–1
3	October 11	@ Heat	L 100–121	Jeremy Lin (16)	Trevor Booker (8)	Greivis Vasquez (6)	American Airlines Arena; 19,600	1–2
4	October 13	Celtics	L 97–100	Luis Scola (14)	Trevor Booker (12)	Jeremy Lin (7)	Barclays Center; 11,043	1–3
5	October 17	@ Celtics	L 99–120	Sean Kilpatrick (15)	Budinger, Lopez, McCullough (5)	Jeremy Lin (5)	TD Garden; 15,925	1–4
6	October 20	Knicks	L 111–116	Jeremy Lin (24)	Hamilton, Scola (6)	Jeremy Lin (10)	Barclays Center; 17,732	1–5

2016–17 pre-season schedule

=== Regular season ===
2016–17 game log
Total: 20–62 (Home: 13–28; Road: 7–34)
October: 1–3 (home: 1–1; road: 0–2)

Game	Date	Team	Score	High points	High rebounds	High assists	Location Attendance	Record
1	October 26	@ Boston	L 117–122	Bojan Bogdanović (21)	Justin Hamilton (10)	Trevor Booker (5)	TD Garden; 18,624	0–1
2	October 28	Indiana	W 103–94	Brook Lopez (25)	Trevor Booker (11)	Jeremy Lin (9)	Barclays Center; 17,732	1–1
3	October 29	@ Milwaukee	L 108–110	Bojan Bogdanović (26)	Trevor Booker (14)	Jeremy Lin (10)	BMO Harris Bradley Center; 12,570	1–2
4	October 31	Chicago	L 88–118	Jeremy Lin (14)	Trevor Booker (8)	Jeremy Lin (4)	Barclays Center; 15,842	1–3

November : 4–9 (home: 3–4; road: 1–5)

Game	Date	Team	Score	High points	High rebounds	High assists	Location Attendance	Record
5	November 2	Detroit	W 109–101	Brook Lopez (34)	Brook Lopez (11)	Rondae Hollis-Jefferson (6)	Barclays Center; 13,650	2–3
6	November 4	Charlotte	L 95–99	Sean Kilpatrick (19)	Trevor Booker (13)	Rondae Hollis-Jefferson (6)	Barclays Center; 15,775	2–4
7	November 8	Minnesota	W 119–110	Brook Lopez (26)	Trevor Booker (9)	Isaiah Whitehead (7)	Barclays Center; 13,610	3–4
8	November 9	@ New York	L 96–110	Lopez, Hamilton (21)	Joe Harris (7)	Sean Kilpatrick (5)	Madison Square Garden; 19,812	3–5
9	November 12	@ Phoenix	W 122–104	Rondae Hollis-Jefferson (20)	Rondae Hollis-Jefferson (13)	Hollis-Jefferson, Booker, Kilpatrick (4)	Talking Stick Resort Arena; 17,126	4–5
10	November 14	@ L.A. Clippers	L 95–127	Bojan Bogdanović (18)	Anthony Bennett (9)	Yogi Ferrell (5)	Staples Center; 19,060	4–6
11	November 15	@ L.A. Lakers	L 118–125	Brook Lopez (30)	Lopez, Booker (26)	Randy Foye (7)	Staples Center; 18,624	4–7
12	November 18	@ Oklahoma City	L 105–124	Brook Lopez (22)	Rondae Hollis-Jefferson (5)	Isaiah Whitehead (4)	Chesapeake Energy Arena; 18,203	4–8
13	November 20	Portland	L 109–129	Brook Lopez (21)	Brook Lopez (6)	Lopez, Hollis-Jefferson (4)	Barclays Center; 16,608	4–9
14	November 23	Boston	L 92–111	Sean Kilpatrick (23)	Trevor Booker (12)	Booker, Whitehead, Kilpatrick (3)	Barclays Center; 16,210	4–10
15	November 25	@ Indiana	L 97–118	Brook Lopez (20)	Trevor Booker (10)	Whitehead, Kilpatrick (7)	Bankers Life Fieldhouse; 16,083	4–11
16	November 27	Sacramento	L 105–122	Sean Kilpatrick (22)	Justin Hamilton (10)	Trevor Booker (5)	Barclays Center; 13,646	4–12
17	November 29	L.A. Clippers	W 127–122 (2OT)	Sean Kilpatrick (38)	Sean Kilpatrick (14)	Trevor Booker (5)	Barclays Center; 15,681	5–12

December : 3–12 (home: 3–3; road: 0–9)

Game	Date	Team	Score	High points	High rebounds	High assists	Location Attendance	Record
18	December 1	Milwaukee	L 93–111	Brook Lopez (15)	Trevor Booker (8)	Whitehead, Kilpatrick (4)	Barclays Center; 12,675	5–13
19	December 3	@ Milwaukee	L 103–112	Bojan Bogdanović (24)	Anthony Bennett (14)	Brook Lopez (6)	BMO Harris Bradley Center; 15,565	5–14
20	December 5	Washington	L 113–118	Brook Lopez (25)	Trevor Booker (14)	Whitehead, Lopez (5)	Barclays Center; 12,529	5–15
21	December 7	Denver	W 116–111	Brook Lopez (24)	Trevor Booker (12)	Trevor Booker (5)	Barclays Center; 14,159	6–15
22	December 10	@ San Antonio	L 101–130	Bojan Bogdanović (20)	Luis Scola (11)	Brook Lopez (5)	AT&T Center; 18,418	6–16
23	December 12	@ Houston	L 118–122	Brook Lopez (26)	Trevor Booker (13)	Jeremy Lin (7)	Toyota Center; 13,619	6–17
24	December 14	L. A. Lakers	W 107–97	Bojan Bogdanović (23)	Trevor Booker (18)	Sean Kilpatrick (5)	Barclays Center; 17,732	7–17
25	December 16	@ Orlando	L 111–118	Brook Lopez (22)	Trevor Booker (9)	Isaiah Whitehead (8)	Amway Center; 17,668	7–18
26	December 18	@ Philadelphia	L 107–108	Brook Lopez (22)	Brook Lopez (9)	Brook Lopez (8)	Wells Fargo Center; 16,460	7–19
27	December 20	@ Toronto	L 104–116	Hollis-Jefferson (19)	Justin Hamilton (11)	Hamilton, Hollis-Jefferson (4)	Air Canada Centre; 19,800	7–20
28	December 22	Golden State	L 101–117	Brook Lopez (28)	Lopez, Lin (8)	Jeremy Lin (11)	Barclays Center; 17,732	7–21
29	December 23	@ Cleveland	L 99–119	Brook Lopez (16)	Caris LeVert (7)	Jeremy Lin (6)	Quicken Loans Arena; 20,562	7–22
30	December 26	Charlotte	W 120–118	Bojan Bogdanović (26)	Trevor Booker (12)	Brook Lopez (5)	Barclays Center; 17,732	8–22
31	December 28	@ Chicago	L 99–101	Brook Lopez (33)	Trevor Booker (14)	Sean Kilpatrick (6)	United Center; 21,957	8–23
32	December 30	@ Washington	L 95–118	Booker, Hollis-Jefferson (16)	Trevor Booker (7)	Brook Lopez (6)	Verizon Center; 16,461	8–24

January : 1–15 (home: 0–9; road: 1–6)

Game	Date	Team	Score	High points	High rebounds	High assists	Location Attendance	Record
33	January 2	Utah	L 89–101	Trevor Booker (17)	Trevor Booker (15)	Spencer Dinwiddie (4)	Barclays Center; 15,634	8–25
34	January 5	@ Indiana	L 109–121	Booker, Hamilton (16)	Justin Hamilton (11)	Sean Kilpatrick (5)	Bankers Life Fieldhouse; 16,421	8–26
35	January 6	Cleveland	L 108–116	Bojan Bogdanovic (23)	Trevor Booker (12)	Caris LeVert (5)	Barclays Center; 17,732	8–27
36	January 8	Philadelphia	L 95–105	Brook Lopez (26)	Bojan Bogdanovic (8)	Booker, Whitehead, Bogdanovic, Dinwiddie, Kilpatrick (3)	Barclays Center; 16,123	8–28
37	January 10	Atlanta	L 97–117	Brook Lopez (20)	Hollis-Jefferson, Dinwiddie, Scola (7)	Spencer Dinwiddie (5)	Barclays Center; 13,279	8–29
38	January 12	New Orleans	L 95–104	Bojan Bogdanovic (20)	Trevor Booker (12)	Hollis-Jefferson, Dinwiddie, Booker (4)	Barclays Center; 14,352	8–30
39	January 13	@ Toronto	L 113–132	Brook Lopez (20)	Bojan Bogdanovic (7)	Randy Foye (7)	Air Canada Centre; 19,800	8–31
40	January 15	Houston	L 112–137	Rondae Hollis-Jefferson (14)	Rondae Hollis-Jefferson (7)	Spencer Dinwiddie (8)	Barclays Center; 17,732	8–32
41	January 17	Toronto	L 109–119	Brook Lopez (28)	Booker, Lopez, Hollis-Jefferson (8)	Caris LeVert (4)	Barclays Center; 12,874	8–33
42	January 20	@ New Orleans	W 143–114	Lopez, Bogdanovic (23)	Brook Lopez (8)	Caris LeVert (8)	Smoothie King Center; 17,004	9–33
43	January 21	@ Charlotte	L 105–112	Brook Lopez (24)	Trevor Booker (9)	Kilpatrick, Foye (5)	Spectrum Center; 18,583	9–34
44	January 23	San Antonio	L 86–112	Isaiah Whitehead (19)	Sean Kilpatrick (10)	Randy Foye (4)	Barclays Center; 16,643	9–35
45	January 25	Miami	L 106–109	Brook Lopez (33)	Trevor Booker (6)	Dinwiddie, Foye, LeVert (4)	Barclays Center; 14,929	9–36
46	January 27	@ Cleveland	L 116–124	Sean Kilpatrick (18)	Randy Foye (8)	Randy Foye (5)	Quicken Loans Arena; 20,562	9–37
47	January 28	@ Minnesota	L 109–129	Brook Lopez (25)	Lopez, Hamilton (7)	Isaiah Whitehead (8)	Target Center; 14,798	9–38
48	January 30	@ Miami	L 96–104	Bojan Bogdanovic (16)	Rondae Hollis-Jefferson (11)	Isaiah Whitehead (5)	American Airlines Arena; 19,600	9–39

February : 0–10 (home: 0–7; road: 0–3)

Game	Date	Team	Score	High points	High rebounds	High assists	Location Attendance	Record
49	February 1	New York	L 90–95	Rondae Hollis-Jefferson (16)	Hollis-Jefferson, Booker (8)	Isaiah Whitehead (4)	Barclays Center; 17,732	9–40
50	February 3	Indiana	L 97–106	Brook Lopez (23)	Trevor Booker (7)	Kilpatrick, Booker, Whitehead (4)	Barclays Center; 14,557	9–41
51	February 5	Toronto	L 95–103	Brook Lopez (20)	Trevor Booker (10)	Randy Foye (5)	Barclays Center; 14,245	9–42
52	February 7	@ Charlotte	L 107–111	Bojan Bogdanovic (22)	Trevor Booker (12)	Isaiah Whitehead (7)	Spectrum Center; 15,322	9–43
53	February 8	Washington	L 110–114 (OT)	Bojan Bogdanovic (21)	Hollis-Jefferson, Booker (11)	Lopez, Bogdanovic (4)	Barclays Center; 13,179	9–44
54	February 10	Miami	L 99–108	Brook Lopez (30)	Trevor Booker (10)	Spencer Dinwiddie (8)	Barclays Center; 15,382	9–45
55	February 13	Memphis	L 103–112	Dinwiddie, Lopez (17)	Sean Kilpatrick (6)	Brook Lopez (5)	Barclays Center; 13,597	9–46
56	February 15	Milwaukee	L 125–129	Brook Lopez (36)	Rondae Hollis-Jefferson (10)	Spencer Dinwiddie (8)	Barclays Center; 16,182	9–47
57	February 24	@ Denver	L 109–129	Brook Lopez (17)	Trevor Booker (9)	Lin, Dinwiddie (5)	Pepsi Center; 17,143	9–48
58	February 25	@ Golden State	L 95–112	Rondae Hollis-Jefferson (16)	Hollis-Jefferson, Booker, Kilpatrick (10)	Dinwiddie, Lopez (5)	Oracle Arena; 19,596	9–49

March : 7–10 (home: 3–4; road: 4–6)

Game	Date	Team	Score	High points	High rebounds	High assists	Location Attendance	Record
59	March 1	@ Sacramento	W 109–100	Brook Lopez (24)	Booker, Lopez (5)	Jeremy Lin (5)	Golden 1 Center; 17,608	10–49
60	March 3	@ Utah	L 97–112	Quincy Acy (18)	Trevor Booker (11)	Spencer Dinwiddie (3)	Vivint Smart Home Arena; 19,911	10–50
61	March 4	@ Portland	L 116–130	Brook Lopez (26)	Rondae Hollis-Jefferson (8)	Caris LeVert (6)	Moda Center; 19,638	10–51
62	March 6	@ Memphis	W 122–109	Sean Kilpatrick (23)	Trevor Booker (9)	Dinwiddie, Kilpatrick (3)	FedExForum; 15,505	11–51
63	March 8	@ Atlanta	L 105–110	Sean Kilpatrick (27)	Trevor Booker (8)	Jeremy Lin (8)	Philips Arena; 11,931	11–52
64	March 10	@ Dallas	L 96–105	Isaiah Whitehead (24)	Trevor Booker (7)	Sean Kilpatrick (5)	American Airlines Center; 20,022	11–53
65	March 12	New York	W 120–112	Brook Lopez (26)	Rondae Hollis-Jefferson (11)	Spencer Dinwiddie (6)	Barclays Center; 17,732	12–53
66	March 14	Oklahoma City	L 104–122	Brook Lopez (25)	Brook Lopez (6)	Jeremy Lin (5)	Barclays Center; 13,911	12–54
67	March 16	@ New York	W 121–110	Brook Lopez (24)	Rondae Hollis-Jefferson (10)	Jeremy Lin (8)	Madison Square Garden; 19,812	13–54
68	March 17	Boston	L 95–98	Brook Lopez (23)	Quincy Acy (8)	Jeremy Lin (6)	Barclays Center; 17,732	13–55
69	March 19	Dallas	L 104–111	Brook Lopez (27)	Rondae Hollis-Jefferson (9)	Spencer Dinwiddie (7)	Barclays Center; 14,045	13–56
70	March 21	Detroit	W 98–96	Brook Lopez (29)	Spencer Dinwiddie (8)	Randy Foye (5)	Barclays Center; 14,343	14–56
71	March 23	Phoenix	W 126–98	Brook Lopez (19)	Rondae Hollis-Jefferson (16)	Jeremy Lin (5)	Barclays Center; 15,141	15–56
72	March 24	@ Washington	L 108–129	Justin Hamilton (20)	Hollis-Jefferson, Lopez (7)	Randy Foye (4)	Verizon Center; 19,616	15–57
73	March 26	@ Atlanta	W 107–92	Brook Lopez (23)	Rondae Hollis-Jefferson (13)	Jeremy Lin (7)	Philips Arena; 15,921	16–57
74	March 28	Philadelphia	L 101–106	Brook Lopez (26)	Brook Lopez (9)	Jeremy Lin (7)	Barclays Center; 15,471	16–58
75	March 30	@ Detroit	L 89–90	Sean Kilpatrick (15)	Hollis-Jefferson, Lopez (9)	LeVert, Lin (4)	The Palace of Auburn Hills; 15,804	16–59

April : 4–3 (home: 3–0; road: 1–3)

Game	Date	Team	Score	High points	High rebounds	High assists	Location Attendance	Record
76	April 1	Orlando	W 121–111	Brook Lopez (30)	Trevor Booker (8)	Jeremy Lin (8)	Barclays Center; 15,976	17–59
77	April 2	Atlanta	W 91–82	Brook Lopez (29)	Sean Kilpatrick (11)	Jeremy Lin (6)	Barclays Center; 15,040	18–59
78	April 4	@ Philadelphia	W 141–118	Lin, Lopez (16)	Booker, Lin (5)	Dinwiddie, LeVert, Lin (7)	Wells Fargo Center; 14,580	19–59
79	April 6	@ Orlando	L 107–115	Jeremy Lin (32)	Acy, Goodwin, Hollis-Jefferson, Lin, Lopez (5)	Rondae Hollis-Jefferson (4)	Amway Center; 18,095	19–60
80	April 8	Chicago	W 107–106	Dinwiddie, LeVert (19)	Rondae Hollis-Jefferson (12)	Jeremy Lin (7)	Barclays Center; 17,732	20–60
81	April 10	@ Boston	L 105–114	Jeremy Lin (26)	Jeremy Lin (12)	Lin, Whitehead (4)	TD Garden; 18,624	20–61
82	April 12	@ Chicago	L 73–114	Archie Goodwin (20)	Justin Hamilton (7)	Goodwin, Hamilton (4)	United Center; 21,648	20–62

2016–17 season schedule

== Player statistics ==
Legend
GP	Games played	GS	Games started	MPG	Minutes per game
FG%	Field-goal percentage	3P%	3-point field-goal percentage	FT%	Free-throw percentage
RPG	Rebounds per game	APG	Assists per game	SPG	Steals per game
BPG	Blocks per game	PPG	Points per game

=== Regular season ===
Brooklyn Nets statistics
Player	GP	GS	MPG	FG%	3P%	FT%	RPG	APG	SPG	BPG	PPG
Rondae Hollis-Jefferson	78	50	22.6	.434	.224	.751	5.8	2.0	1.1	.6	8.7
Brook Lopez	75	75	29.6	.474	.346	.810	5.4	2.3	.5	1.7	20.5
Isaiah Whitehead	73	26	22.5	.402	.295	.805	2.5	2.6	.6	.5	7.4
Trevor Booker	71	43	24.7	.516	.321	.673	8.0	1.9	1.1	.4	10.0
Sean Kilpatrick	70	24	25.1	.415	.341	.843	4.0	2.2	.6	.1	13.1
Randy Foye	69	40	18.6	.363	.330	.857	2.2	2.0	.5	.1	5.2
Justin Hamilton	64	7	18.4	.459	.306	.750	4.1	.9	.5	.7	6.9
Spencer Dinwiddie	59	18	22.6	.444	.376	.792	2.8	3.1	.7	.4	7.3
Caris LeVert	57	26	21.7	.450	.321	.720	3.3	1.9	.9	.1	8.2
Bojan Bogdanović^{†}	55	54	26.9	.440	.357	.874	3.6	1.6	.4	.1	14.2
Joe Harris	52	11	21.9	.425	.385	.714	2.8	1.0	.6	.2	8.2
Jeremy Lin	36	33	24.5	.438	.372	.816	3.8	5.1	1.2	.4	14.5
Luis Scola	36	1	12.8	.470	.340	.676	3.9	1.0	.4	.1	5.1
Quincy Acy^{†}	32	1	15.9	.425	.434	.754	3.3	.6	.4	.5	6.5
Anthony Bennett	23	1	11.5	.413	.271	.722	3.4	.5	.2	.1	5.0
K. J. McDaniels^{†}	20	0	14.7	.455	.282	.821	2.6	.5	.6	.5	6.3
Chris McCullough^{†}	14	0	5.1	.516	.167	.667	1.2	.1	.1	.1	2.5
Archie Goodwin^{†}	12	0	15.3	.557	.308	.719	2.3	1.9	.3	.3	7.9
Yogi Ferrell^{†}	10	0	15.1	.367	.296	.625	1.2	1.7	.2	.2	5.4
Andrew Nicholson^{†}	10	0	11.1	.382	.182	1.000	2.7	.3	.5	.0	3.0
Greivis Vásquez	3	0	13.0	.250	.333	.667	.7	1.7	.3	.3	2.3

- ^{†} Denotes player spent time with another team in the season. Stats reflect time with the Nets only.

== Transactions ==
=== Trades ===
June 23, 2016	To Brooklyn Nets Draft rights to Isaiah Whitehead	To Utah Jazz Draft rights to Marcus Paige; Cash considerations
July 7, 2016	To Brooklyn Nets Draft rights to Caris LeVert; Protected Indiana 2nd round-pick	To Indiana Pacers Thaddeus Young

=== Free agency ===
==== Additions ====
Player	Signed	Former team
Jeremy Lin	3-year contract worth $36 million	Charlotte Hornets
Trevor Booker	2-year contract worth $18 million	Utah Jazz
Justin Hamilton	2-year contract worth $6 million	(Spain) Valencia Basket
Luis Scola	1-year contract worth $5.5 million	Toronto Raptors
Greivis Vásquez	1-year contract worth $5 million	Milwaukee Bucks
Anthony Bennett	2-year contract worth $2.1 million	Toronto Raptors
Randy Foye	1-year contract worth $2.5 million	Oklahoma City Thunder
Joe Harris	2-year contract worth $2 million	Cleveland Cavaliers
Yogi Ferrell	10-game contract worth $102,300	Indiana Hoosiers / Long Island Nets
Egidijus Mockevičius		Evansville Purple Aces
Chase Budinger		Phoenix Suns
Archie Goodwin	Two 10-day contracts / 2-year contract worth $2 million	Phoenix Suns / New Orleans Pelicans / Greensboro Swarm
Prince Ibeh		Texas Longhorns / Long Island Nets
Cliff Alexander		Long Island Nets

==== Subtractions ====
Player	Reason left	New Team
Wayne Ellington	2-year contract worth $12 million	Miami Heat
Willie Reed	2-year contract worth $2.1 million	Miami Heat
Henry Sims		Salt Lake City Stars
Yogi Ferrell	Waived	Long Island Nets / Dallas Mavericks
Anthony Bennett	Waived	(Turkey) Fenerbahçe
