= 2016–17 Philadelphia 76ers season =

NBA professional basketball team season

- Head coach: Brett Brown
- General manager: Bryan Colangelo
- Owners: Josh Harris
- Arena: Wells Fargo Center

Results
- Record: 28–54 (.341)
- Place: Division: 4th (Atlantic); Conference: 14th (Eastern)
- Playoff finish: Did not qualify
- Stats at Basketball Reference

Local media
- Television: CSN (69 games); TCN (12 games)
- Radio: WPEN

The 2016–17 Philadelphia 76ers season was the 68th season of the franchise in the National Basketball Association (NBA).

The team improved 18 games after finishing with a league worst 10 wins in 2016. The season would have been the rookie season for number one overall pick in the 2016 NBA draft Ben Simmons, but a broken foot injury sidelined him for the whole season. It would be the team's fourth straight season where a top prospect of theirs would be sidelined for an entire season due to an injury (the 76ers previously dealt with former center Nerlens Noel being out in the 2013–14 NBA season and Joel Embiid being out for two straight seasons before this one). However, Embiid, who was previously drafted 3rd in the 2014 draft, played in his first season after suffering multiple foot injuries before later being out for the rest of the season after playing a promising 31 games throughout the season. Also, it was the first season of draft and stash prospect Dario Šarić, who was also taken in the 2014 NBA draft. The 2016 season was also the first time in three years the Sixers made a splash in NBA free agency by adding guards Jerryd Bayless, Sergio Rodríguez and veteran Gerald Henderson Jr. to the team.

== Draft picks ==
| Round | Pick | Player | Position(s) | Nationality | College / Team |
|---|---|---|---|---|---|
| 1 | 1 | Ben Simmons | SF/PF | Australia | LSU |
| 1 | 24 | Timothé Luwawu-Cabarrot | SG/SF | France | Mega Leks (Serbia) |
| 1 | 26 | Furkan Korkmaz | SG/SF | Turkey | Anadolu Efes (Turkey) |

=== Offseason ===
During the off season the Sixers finished their Training Complex.

== Game log ==
=== Preseason ===
2016 pre-season game log
Total: 2–5 (Home: 1–2; Road: 1–3)
Pre-season: 2–5 (home: 1–2; road: 1–3)

| Game | Date | Team | Score | High points | High rebounds | High assists | Location Attendance | Record |
|---|---|---|---|---|---|---|---|---|
| 1 | October 4 | Celtics | W 92–89 | Brandon Paul (15) | Robert Covington (8) | Sergio Rodríguez (6) | Mullins Center; 9,493 | 1–0 |
| 2 | October 6 | Wizards | L 119–125 (2OT) | Richaun Holmes (20) | Richaun Holmes (12) | T. J. McConnell (8) | Wells Fargo Center; 15,440 | 1–1 |
| 3 | October 8 | @ Cavaliers | L 105–108 | Richaun Holmes (19) | James Webb III (7) | Sergio Rodríguez (8) | Quicken Loans Arena; 19,694 | 1–2 |
| 4 | October 11 | @ Grizzlies | L 91–121 | Luwawu-Cabarrot, Embiid (13) | Timothe Luwawu-Cabarrot (9) | T. J. McConnell (5) | FedExForum; 14,248 | 1–3 |
| 5 | October 13 | @ Wizards | L 79–100 | Jerami Grant (14) | Joel Embiid (12) | Sergio Rodríguez (7) | Verizon Center; 10,242 | 1–4 |
| 6 | October 15 | Pistons | L 76–97 | Joel Embiid (15) | Embiid, Holmes, Henderson (5) | Sergio Rodríguez (7) | Wells Fargo Center; 10,891 | 1–5 |
| 7 | October 21 | @ Heat | W 113–110 | Dario Šarić (19) | Embiid (9) | Sergio Rodríguez (4) | AmericanAirlines Arena; 19,600 | 2–5 |

2016–17 season schedule

=== Regular season ===
2016–17 game log
Total: 28–54 (Home: 17–24; Road: 11–30)
October: 0–2 (home: 0–2; road: 0–0)

| Game | Date | Team | Score | High points | High rebounds | High assists | Location Attendance | Record |
|---|---|---|---|---|---|---|---|---|
| 1 | October 26 | Oklahoma City | L 97–103 | Joel Embiid (20) | Joel Embiid (7) | Sergio Rodríguez (9) | Wells Fargo Center; 20,487 | 0–1 |
| 2 | October 29 | Atlanta | L 72–104 | Embiid, Rodríguez (14) | Richaun Holmes (6) | Sergio Rodríguez (5) | Wells Fargo Center; 16,312 | 0–2 |

November: 4–12 (home: 4–6; road: 0–6)

| Game | Date | Team | Score | High points | High rebounds | High assists | Location Attendance | Record |
|---|---|---|---|---|---|---|---|---|
| 3 | November 1 | Orlando | L 101–103 | Hollis Thompson (22) | Joel Embiid (10) | Sergio Rodríguez (11) | Wells Fargo Center; 12,529 | 0–3 |
| 4 | November 2 | @ Charlotte | L 93–109 | Šarić, İlyasova (14) | Dario Šarić (7) | Sergio Rodríguez (11) | Spectrum Center; 15,275 | 0–4 |
| 5 | November 5 | Cleveland | L 101–102 | Joel Embiid (22) | Robert Covington (8) | Sergio Rodríguez (11) | Wells Fargo Center; 20,497 | 0–5 |
| 6 | November 7 | Utah | L 84–109 | Jahlil Okafor (15) | Joel Embiid (9) | Sergio Rodríguez (5) | Wells Fargo Center; 14,168 | 0–6 |
| 7 | November 9 | @ Indiana | L 115–122 (OT) | Robert Covington (23) | Dario Šarić (12) | Rodríguez, McConnell (5) | Bankers Life Fieldhouse; 15,360 | 0–7 |
| 8 | November 11 | Indiana | W 109–105 (OT) | Joel Embiid (25) | Richaun Holmes (12) | Sergio Rodríguez (9) | Wells Fargo Center; 17,643 | 1–7 |
| 9 | November 12 | @ Atlanta | L 96–117 | Jahlil Okafor (18) | Dario Šarić (7) | T. J. McConnell (6) | Philips Arena; 17,399 | 1–8 |
| 10 | November 14 | @ Houston | L 88–115 | Embiid, İlyasova (13) | Joel Embiid (10) | Sergio Rodríguez (6) | Toyota Center; 13,183 | 1–9 |
| 11 | November 16 | Washington | W 109–102 | Jahlil Okafor (19) | Dario Šarić (12) | Sergio Rodríguez (12) | Wells Fargo Center; 14,863 | 2–9 |
| 12 | November 17 | @ Minnesota | L 86–110 | Dario Šarić (16) | Joel Embiid (10) | T. J. McConnell (7) | Target Center; 16,866 | 2–10 |
| 13 | November 19 | Phoenix | W 120–105 | Joel Embiid (26) | Sergio Rodríguez (8) | Sergio Rodríguez (10) | Wells Fargo Center; 18,125 | 3–10 |
| 14 | November 21 | Miami | W 101–94 | Joel Embiid (22) | Ersan İlyasova (11) | Sergio Rodríguez (5) | Wells Fargo Center; 16,477 | 4–10 |
| 15 | November 23 | Memphis | L 99–104 (2OT) | Ersan İlyasova (22) | Ersan İlyasova (12) | Jerryd Bayless (6) | Wells Fargo Center; 15,880 | 4–11 |
| 16 | November 25 | Chicago | L 89–105 | Ersan İlyasova (14) | Ilyasova, Šarić (7) | Saric, Rodríguez, Stauskas (3) | Wells Fargo Center; 18,234 | 4–12 |
| 17 | November 27 | Cleveland | L 108–112 | Joel Embiid (22) | Embiid, Okafor (22) | Sergio Rodríguez (7) | Wells Fargo Center; 19,311 | 4–13 |
| 18 | November 28 | @ Toronto | L 95–122 | Robert Covington (20) | Richaun Holmes (9) | Sergio Rodríguez (9) | Air Canada Centre; 19,800 | 4–14 |

December : 4–10 (home: 1–6; road: 3–4)

| Game | Date | Team | Score | High points | High rebounds | High assists | Location Attendance | Record |
|---|---|---|---|---|---|---|---|---|
| 19 | December 2 | Orlando | L 88–105 | Joel Embiid (20) | Jahlil Okafor (13) | Sergio Rodríguez (9) | Wells Fargo Center; 13,711 | 4–15 |
| 20 | December 3 | Boston | L 106–107 | Dario Šarić (21) | Dario Šarić (12) | Sergio Rodríguez (8) | Wells Fargo Center; 17,063 | 4–16 |
| 21 | December 5 | Denver | L 98–106 | Rodriguez, Ilyasova, Šarić (17) | Holmes, Ilyasova, Šarić (8) | Sergio Rodríguez (7) | Wells Fargo Center; 11,815 | 4–17 |
| 22 | December 6 | @ Memphis | L 91–96 | Ersan İlyasova (23) | Ersan İlyasova (17) | T. J. McConnell (9) | FedEx Forum; 13,521 | 4–18 |
| 23 | December 8 | @ New Orleans | W 99–88 | Ersan İlyasova (23) | Ersan İlyasova (8) | Sergio Rodríguez (8) | Smoothie King Center; 14,158 | 5–18 |
| 24 | December 11 | @ Detroit | W 97–79 | Robert Covington (16) | T. J. McConnell (10) | T. J. McConnell (9) | The Palace of Auburn Hills; 7,244 | 6–18 |
| 25 | December 14 | Toronto | L 114–123 | Robert Covington (26) | Robert Covington (12) | T. J. McConnell (8) | Wells Fargo Center; 16,192 | 6–19 |
| 26 | December 16 | L.A. Lakers | L 89–100 | Joel Embiid (15) | Ersan İlyasova (10) | T. J. McConnell (9) | Wells Fargo Center; 20,491 | 6–20 |
| 27 | December 18 | Brooklyn | W 108–107 | Joel Embiid (33) | Jahlil Okafor (12) | T. J. McConnell (6) | Wells Fargo Center; 16,460 | 7–20 |
| 28 | December 20 | New Orleans | L 93–108 | Ersan İlyasova (14) | Robert Covington (8) | T. J. McConnell (6) | Wells Fargo Center; 16,322 | 7–21 |
| 29 | December 23 | @ Phoenix | L 116–123 | Joel Embiid (27) | Joel Embiid (7) | Sergio Rodríguez (7) | Talking Stick Resort Arena; 16,535 | 7–22 |
| 30 | December 26 | @ Sacramento | L 100–102 | Joel Embiid (25) | Dario Šarić (9) | T. J. McConnell (6) | Golden 1 Center; 17,608 | 7–23 |
| 31 | December 29 | @ Utah | L 83–100 | Ersan İlyasova (16) | Ersan İlyasova (12) | Covington, Stauskas, McConnell (3) | Vivint Smart Home Arena; 19,911 | 7–24 |
| 32 | December 30 | @ Denver | W 124–122 | Ilyasova, Embiid (23) | Ersan İlyasova (12) | T. J. McConnell (8) | Pepsi Center; 13,619 | 8–24 |

January : 10–5 (home: 7–1; road: 3–4)

| Game | Date | Team | Score | High points | High rebounds | High assists | Location Attendance | Record |
|---|---|---|---|---|---|---|---|---|
| 33 | January 3 | Minnesota | W 93–91 | Joel Embiid (25) | Robert Covington (10) | T. J. McConnell (8) | Wells Fargo Center; 17,124 | 9–24 |
| 34 | January 6 | @ Boston | L 106–110 | Joel Embiid (23) | Joel Embiid (8) | T. J. McConnell (17) | TD Garden; 18,624 | 9–25 |
| 35 | January 8 | @ Brooklyn | W 105–95 | Joel Embiid (20) | Robert Covington (11) | T. J. McConnell (6) | Barclays Center; 16,123 | 10–25 |
| 36 | January 11 | New York | W 98–97 | Joel Embiid (21) | Joel Embiid (14) | T. J. McConnell (7) | Wells Fargo Center; 18,755 | 11–25 |
| 37 | January 13 | Charlotte | W 102–93 | Joel Embiid (24) | Joel Embiid (8) | T. J. McConnell (8) | Wells Fargo Center; 18,215 | 12–25 |
| 38 | January 14 | @ Washington | L 93–109 | Jahlil Okafor (26) | Nerlens Noel (12) | T. J. McConnell (6) | Verizon Center; 17,880 | 12–26 |
| 39 | January 16 | @ Milwaukee | W 113–104 | Joel Embiid (22) | Joel Embiid (12) | Sergio Rodríguez (6) | BMO Harris Bradley Center; 13,261 | 13–26 |
| 40 | January 18 | Toronto | W 94–89 | Joel Embiid (26) | Embiid, Šarić (9) | T. J. McConnell (8) | Wells Fargo Center; 17,223 | 14–26 |
| 41 | January 20 | Portland | W 93–92 | Ersan İlyasova (24) | Joel Embiid (10) | Embiid, McConnell (5) | Wells Fargo Center; 19,476 | 15–26 |
| 42 | January 21 | @ Atlanta | L 93–110 | Ersan İlyasova (21) | Robert Covington (10) | T. J. McConnell (11) | Philips Arena; 15,116 | 15–27 |
| 43 | January 24 | L.A. Clippers | W 121–110 | Nerlens Noel (19) | Covington, Šarić, Noel (8) | T. J. McConnell (10) | Wells Fargo Center; 17,591 | 16–27 |
| 44 | January 25 | @ Milwaukee | W 114–109 | Gerald Henderson Jr. (20) | Nerlens Noel (13) | T. J. McConnell (13) | BMO Harris Bradley Center; 13,663 | 17–27 |
| 45 | January 27 | Houston | L 118–123 | Joel Embiid (32) | Joel Embiid (7) | T. J. McConnell (8) | Wells Fargo Center; 20,588 | 17–28 |
| 46 | January 29 | @ Chicago | L 108–121 | Ersan İlyasova (31) | Robert Covington (12) | T. J. McConnell (12) | United Center; 21,606 | 17–29 |
| 47 | January 30 | Sacramento | W 122–119 | Robert Covington (23) | Robert Covington (10) | T. J. McConnell (11) | Wells Fargo Center; 15,840 | 18–29 |

February : 4–8 (home: 2–2; road: 2–6)

| Game | Date | Team | Score | High points | High rebounds | High assists | Location Attendance | Record |
|---|---|---|---|---|---|---|---|---|
| 48 | February 1 | @ Dallas | L 95–113 | Jahlil Okafor (16) | Ersan İlyasova (10) | Rodríguez, McConnell (4) | American Airlines Center; 19,263 | 18–30 |
| 49 | February 2 | @ San Antonio | L 86–102 | Ersan İlyasova (25) | Ersan İlyasova (10) | T. J. McConnell (7) | AT&T Center; 18,418 | 18–31 |
| 50 | February 4 | @ Miami | L 102–125 | Ersan İlyasova (21) | Noel, Holmes (7) | Nik Stauskas (6) | American Airlines Arena; 19,754 | 18–32 |
| 51 | February 6 | @ Detroit | L 96–113 | Jahlil Okafor (16) | T. J. McConnell (7) | Dario Šarić (4) | The Palace of Auburn Hills; 14,731 | 18–33 |
| 52 | February 8 | San Antonio | L 103–111 | Okafor, Šarić (20) | Jahlil Okafor (8) | Nik Stauskas (7) | Wells Fargo Center; 19,233 | 18–34 |
| 53 | February 9 | @ Orlando | W 112–111 | Dario Šarić (24) | Robert Covington (9) | T. J. McConnell (8) | Amway Center; 17,829 | 19–34 |
| 54 | February 11 | Miami | W 117–109 | Noel, Covington (19) | Robert Covington (7) | T. J. McConnell (10) | Wells Fargo Center; 20,698 | 20–34 |
| 55 | February 13 | @ Charlotte | W 105–99 | Dario Šarić (18) | Dario Šarić (11) | T. J. McConnell (7) | Spectrum Center; 15,775 | 21–34 |
| 56 | February 15 | @ Boston | L 108–116 | Dario Šarić (20) | Dario Šarić (11) | T. J. McConnell (8) | TD Garden; 18,624 | 21–35 |
| 57 | February 24 | Washington | W 120–112 | Robert Covington (25) | Robert Covington (11) | Rodríguez, McConnell (8) | Wells Fargo Center; 19,277 | 22–35 |
| 58 | February 25 | @ New York | L 109–110 | Jahlil Okafor (28) | Dario Šarić (15) | T. J. McConnell (7) | Madison Square Garden; 19,812 | 22–36 |
| 59 | February 27 | Golden State | L 108–119 | Dario Šarić (21) | Robert Covington (8) | Dario Šarić (7) | Wells Fargo Center; 20,585 | 22–37 |

March : 6–11 (home: 3–4; road: 3–7)

| Game | Date | Team | Score | High points | High rebounds | High assists | Location Attendance | Record |
|---|---|---|---|---|---|---|---|---|
| 60 | March 1 | @ Miami | L 98–125 | Robert Covington (19) | Jahlil Okafor (7) | T. J. McConnell (5) | AmericanAirlines Arena; 19,609 | 22–38 |
| 61 | March 3 | New York | W 105–102 | Dario Šarić (21) | Dario Šarić (10) | Saric, McConnell (4) | Wells Fargo Center; 18,518 | 23–38 |
| 62 | March 4 | Detroit | L 106–136 | Nik Stauskas (24) | Justin Anderson (8) | T. J. McConnell (8) | Wells Fargo Center; 19,523 | 23–39 |
| 63 | March 6 | Milwaukee | L 98–112 | Justin Anderson (19) | Richaun Holmes (9) | Rodríguez, McConnell (8) | Wells Fargo Center; 18,351 | 23–40 |
| 64 | March 9 | @ Portland | L 108–114 (OT) | Dario Šarić (28) | Robert Covington (19) | Rodriguez, McConnell (6) | Moda Center; 19,240 | 23–41 |
| 65 | March 11 | @ L.A. Clippers | L 100–112 | Richaun Holmes (24) | Richaun Holmes (9) | T. J. McConnell (10) | Staples Center; 19,060 | 23–42 |
| 66 | March 12 | @ L.A. Lakers | W 118–116 | Dario Šarić (29) | Dario Šarić (7) | T. J. McConnell (8) | Staples Center; 18,997 | 24–42 |
| 67 | March 14 | @ Golden State | L 104–106 | Dario Šarić (25) | Robert Covington (9) | T. J. McConnell (10) | Oracle Arena; 19,596 | 24–43 |
| 68 | March 17 | Dallas | W 116–74 | Justin Anderson (19) | Robert Covington (9) | Rodríguez, McConnell (6) | Wells Fargo Center; 17,642 | 25–43 |
| 69 | March 19 | Boston | W 105–99 | Dario Šarić (23) | Robert Covington (9) | Rodríguez, McConnell (6) | Wells Fargo Center; 19,446 | 26–43 |
| 70 | March 20 | @ Orlando | L 109–112 (OT) | Covington, Holmes (24) | Richaun Holmes (14) | T. J. McConnell (11) | Amway Center; 16,236 | 26–44 |
| 71 | March 22 | @ Oklahoma City | L 97–122 | Nik Stauskas (20) | Shawn Long (6) | Rodríguez, McConnell (4) | Chesapeake Energy Arena; 18,203 | 26–45 |
| 72 | March 24 | @ Chicago | W 117–107 | Dario Šarić (32) | Dario Šarić (10) | T. J. McConnell (8) | United Center; 21,558 | 27–45 |
| 73 | March 26 | @ Indiana | L 94–107 | Sergio Rodríguez (16) | Richaun Holmes (12) | T. J. McConnell (7) | Bankers Life Fieldhouse; 16,467 | 27–46 |
| 74 | March 28 | @ Brooklyn | W 106–101 | Dario Šarić (23) | Robert Covington (13) | T. J. McConnell (10) | Barclays Center; 15,471 | 28–46 |
| 75 | March 29 | Atlanta | L 92–99 | Richaun Holmes (25) | Timothe Luwawu-Cabarrot (10) | T. J. McConnell (8) | Wells Fargo Center; 15,212 | 28–47 |
| 76 | March 31 | @ Cleveland | L 105–122 | Luwawu-Cabarrot, Holmes (19) | Justin Anderson (10) | T. J. McConnell (7) | Quicken Loans Arena; 20,562 | 28–48 |

April : 0–6 (home: 0–4; road: 0–2)

| Game | Date | Team | Score | High points | High rebounds | High assists | Location Attendance | Record |
|---|---|---|---|---|---|---|---|---|
| 77 | April 2 | @ Toronto | L 105–113 | Timothe Luwawu-Cabarrot (23) | Richaun Holmes (7) | T. J. McConnell (11) | Air Canada Centre; 19,800 | 28–49 |
| 78 | April 4 | Brooklyn | L 118–141 | Timothe Luwawu-Cabarrot (19) | Alex Poythress (7) | T. J. McConnell (7) | Wells Fargo Center; 14,580 | 28–50 |
| 79 | April 6 | Chicago | L 90–102 | Timothe Luwawu-Cabarrot (18) | Holmes, Šarić (10) | T. J. McConnell (8) | Wells Fargo Center; 15,177 | 28–51 |
| 80 | April 8 | Milwaukee | L 82–90 | Richaun Holmes (17) | Richaun Holmes (10) | T. J. McConnell (10) | Wells Fargo Center; 16,301 | 28–52 |
| 81 | April 10 | Indiana | L 111–120 | Timothe Luwawu-Cabarrot (24) | Holmes, Šarić (6) | T. J. McConnell (8) | Wells Fargo Center; 14,622 | 28–53 |
| 82 | April 12 | @ New York | L 113–114 | Justin Anderson (26) | Shawn Long (9) | T. J. McConnell (8) | Madison Square Garden; 19,812 | 28–54 |

2016–17 season schedule

== Standings ==
=== Division ===
| Atlantic Division | W | L | PCT | GB | Home | Road | Div | GP |
|---|---|---|---|---|---|---|---|---|
| c – Boston Celtics | 53 | 29 | .646 | – | 30‍–‍11 | 23‍–‍18 | 11–5 | 82 |
| x – Toronto Raptors | 51 | 31 | .622 | 2.0 | 28‍–‍13 | 23‍–‍18 | 14–2 | 82 |
| New York Knicks | 31 | 51 | .378 | 22.0 | 19‍–‍22 | 12‍–‍29 | 5–11 | 82 |
| Philadelphia 76ers | 28 | 54 | .341 | 25.0 | 17‍–‍24 | 11‍–‍30 | 7–9 | 82 |
| Brooklyn Nets | 20 | 62 | .244 | 33.0 | 13‍–‍28 | 7‍–‍34 | 3–13 | 82 |

=== Conference ===
Eastern Conference
| # | Team | W | L | PCT | GB | GP |
|---|---|---|---|---|---|---|
| 1 | c – Boston Celtics * | 53 | 29 | .646 | – | 82 |
| 2 | y – Cleveland Cavaliers * | 51 | 31 | .622 | 2.0 | 82 |
| 3 | x – Toronto Raptors | 51 | 31 | .622 | 2.0 | 82 |
| 4 | y – Washington Wizards * | 49 | 33 | .598 | 4.0 | 82 |
| 5 | x – Atlanta Hawks | 43 | 39 | .524 | 10.0 | 82 |
| 6 | x – Milwaukee Bucks | 42 | 40 | .512 | 11.0 | 82 |
| 7 | x – Indiana Pacers | 42 | 40 | .512 | 11.0 | 82 |
| 8 | x – Chicago Bulls | 41 | 41 | .500 | 12.0 | 82 |
| 9 | Miami Heat | 41 | 41 | .500 | 12.0 | 82 |
| 10 | Detroit Pistons | 37 | 45 | .451 | 16.0 | 82 |
| 11 | Charlotte Hornets | 36 | 46 | .439 | 17.0 | 82 |
| 12 | New York Knicks | 31 | 51 | .378 | 22.0 | 82 |
| 13 | Orlando Magic | 29 | 53 | .354 | 24.0 | 82 |
| 14 | Philadelphia 76ers | 28 | 54 | .341 | 25.0 | 82 |
| 15 | Brooklyn Nets | 20 | 62 | .244 | 33.0 | 82 |

== Roster ==
2016–17 Philadelphia 76ers roster
Players

| Pos. | No. | Player | Height | Weight | DOB | From |
|---|---|---|---|---|---|---|
| SG | 23 | Justin Anderson | 6 ft 6 in (1.98 m) | 228 lb (103 kg) | 1993–11–19 | Virginia |
| PG | 0 | Jerryd Bayless | 6 ft 3 in (1.91 m) | 200 lb (91 kg) | 1988–08–20 | Arizona |
| SF | 33 | Robert Covington | 6 ft 9 in (2.06 m) | 215 lb (98 kg) | 1990–12–14 | Tennessee State |
| C | 21 | Joel Embiid | 7 ft 0 in (2.13 m) | 250 lb (113 kg) | 1994–03–16 | Kansas |
| SG | 12 | Gerald Henderson | 6 ft 5 in (1.96 m) | 215 lb (98 kg) | 1987–12–09 | Duke |
| C | 22 | Richaun Holmes | 6 ft 10 in (2.08 m) | 245 lb (111 kg) | 1993–10–15 | Bowling Green |
| C | 36 | Shawn Long (DL) | 6 ft 9 in (2.06 m) | 255 lb (116 kg) | 1993–01–29 | Louisiana |
| SF | 20 | Timothé Luwawu-Cabarrot | 6 ft 7 in (2.01 m) | 205 lb (93 kg) | 1995–05–09 | France |
| PG | 1 | T. J. McConnell | 6 ft 2 in (1.88 m) | 200 lb (91 kg) | 1992–03–25 | Arizona |
| C | 8 | Jahlil Okafor | 6 ft 11 in (2.11 m) | 275 lb (125 kg) | 1995–12–15 | Duke |
| SF | 5 | Alex Poythress | 6 ft 7 in (2.01 m) | 238 lb (108 kg) | 1993–09–06 | Kentucky |
| PG | 14 | Sergio Rodríguez | 6 ft 3 in (1.91 m) | 176 lb (80 kg) | 1986–06–12 | Spain |
| PF | 9 | Dario Šarić | 6 ft 11 in (2.11 m) | 225 lb (102 kg) | 1994–04–08 | Croatia |
| SF | 25 | Ben Simmons | 6 ft 10 in (2.08 m) | 240 lb (109 kg) | 1996–07–20 | LSU |
| C | 47 | Tiago Splitter | 6 ft 11 in (2.11 m) | 245 lb (111 kg) | 1985–01–01 | Brazil |
| SG | 11 | Nik Stauskas | 6 ft 6 in (1.98 m) | 205 lb (93 kg) | 1993–10–07 | Michigan |

Coaches
Head coach
- Brett Brown
Assistant(s)
- Jim O'Brien
- Lloyd Pierce
- Kevin Young
- John Bryant (player development)
- Alvin Williams (player development)
- John Townsend (shooting coach)

Legend
- (DP) Unsigned draft pick
- (FA) Free agent
- (S) Suspended
- (DL) On assignment to
  D-League affiliate
- Injured

Roster
Updated: 2017–04–02

=== Roster notes ===
- Small forward Robert Covington played 67 games but was ruled out for the rest of the season on March 31, 2017, due to a right knee injury.
- Center Joel Embiid played 31 games but missed the rest of the season due to a left knee injury.
- Center Jahlil Okafor played 50 games but missed the rest of the season due to a right knee injury.
- Point guard Sergio Rodríguez played 68 games but missed the last 3 remaining games of the season after suffering a left hamstring strain.
- Point guard Ben Simmons missed the entire season due to a right foot injury.

== Awards, records and milestones ==
=== Awards ===
| Player | Award | Date awarded | Ref. |
|---|---|---|---|
| Joel Embiid | Eastern Conference Rookie of the Month (November) | December 1, 2016 | |
| Joel Embiid | Eastern Conference Rookie of the Month (December) | January 2, 2017 | |
| Joel Embiid | Eastern Conference Player of the Week (January 16–22) | January 23, 2017 | |
| Joel Embiid | Eastern Conference Rookie of the Month (January) | February 3, 2017 | |
| Dario Šarić | Eastern Conference Rookie of the Month (February) | March 2, 2017 | |
| Dario Šarić | Eastern Conference Rookie of the Month (March) | April 2, 2017 | |

=== Records ===
- Joel Embiid set second most consecutive 20+ point games by a rookie with 10 (Allen Iverson had 11)

== Announcers ==
| Name | Reporter | Network | Number of Seasons |
|---|---|---|---|
| Marc Zumoff | TV Play by Play | CSN; TCN | 22 |
| Alaa Abdelnaby | TV Color Commentator | CSN; TCN | 2 |
| Molly French | Courtside Reporter | CSN; TCN | 7 |
| Tom McGinnis | Radio Play by Play | WPEN | 27 |
| Matt Cord | Arena PA | N/A | 19 |
| Christian Crosby | In-Arena Host | N/A | 5 |

== National TV ==
For the last three seasons the Sixers had not had a nationally televised game. The last being in February 2013 when a game vs the Chicago Bulls was broadcast on ESPN.

During the 2016–17 campaign the 76ers have three nationally televised games, with the home and season opener on October 26 against the OKC Thunder and December 16 vs the LA Lakers on ESPN. And a November 17 matchup with the Minnesota Timberwolves on TNT.

== Uniforms ==
On September 15 the Sixers announced they will wear special uniforms for Saturday games to honor the 1966–67 Philadelphia 76ers Championship team. The jerseys have a "throwback" style with PHILA on the chest of the jersey and on the shorts there is an insignia of the Liberty Bell with the 76ers logo established in the center with the words "World Championships; 1966 1967".

== Player statistics ==
Legend
| GP | Games played | GS | Games started | MPG | Minutes per game |
| FG% | Field-goal percentage | 3P% | 3-point field-goal percentage | FT% | Free-throw percentage |
| RPG | Rebounds per game | APG | Assists per game | SPG | Steals per game |
| BPG | Blocks per game | PPG | Points per game |

=== Regular season ===
| Player | GP | GS | MPG | FG% | 3P% | FT% | RPG | APG | SPG | BPG | PPG |
|---|---|---|---|---|---|---|---|---|---|---|---|
| T. J. McConnell | 81 | 51 | 26.3 | .461 | .200 | .811 | 3.1 | 6.6 | 1.7 | .1 | 6.9 |
| Dario Šarić | 81 | 36 | 26.3 | .411 | .311 | .782 | 6.3 | 2.2 | .7 | .4 | 12.8 |
| Nik Stauskas | 80 | 27 | 27.4 | .396 | .368 | .813 | 2.8 | 2.4 | .6 | .4 | 9.5 |
| Gerald Henderson Jr. | 72 | 41 | 23.2 | .423 | .353 | .806 | 2.6 | 1.6 | .6 | .2 | 9.2 |
| Timothé Luwawu-Cabarrot | 69 | 19 | 17.2 | .402 | .311 | .854 | 2.2 | 1.1 | .5 | .1 | 6.4 |
| Sergio Rodríguez | 68 | 30 | 22.3 | .392 | .365 | .667 | 2.3 | 5.1 | .7 | .1 | 7.8 |
| Robert Covington | 67 | 67 | 31.6 | .399 | .333 | .822 | 6.5 | 1.5 | 1.9 | 1.0 | 12.9 |
| Richaun Holmes | 57 | 17 | 20.9 | .558 | .351 | .699 | 5.5 | 1.0 | .7 | 1.0 | 9.8 |
| Ersan İlyasova^{†} | 53 | 40 | 27.3 | .440 | .359 | .768 | 5.9 | 1.8 | .6 | .3 | 14.8 |
| Jahlil Okafor | 50 | 33 | 22.7 | .514 | | .671 | 4.8 | 1.2 | .4 | 1.0 | 11.8 |
| Joel Embiid | 31 | 31 | 25.4 | .466 | .367 | .783 | 7.8 | 2.1 | .9 | 2.5 | 20.2 |
| Hollis Thompson^{†} | 31 | 1 | 18.1 | .415 | .366 | .650 | 2.7 | .8 | .5 | .2 | 5.5 |
| Nerlens Noel^{†} | 29 | 7 | 19.4 | .611 | .000 | .683 | 5.0 | 1.0 | 1.5 | .9 | 8.9 |
| Justin Anderson^{†} | 24 | 8 | 21.6 | .463 | .292 | .780 | 4.0 | 1.4 | .5 | .3 | 8.5 |
| Shawn Long | 18 | 0 | 13.0 | .560 | .368 | .543 | 4.7 | .7 | .5 | .5 | 8.2 |
| Tiago Splitter | 8 | 0 | 9.5 | .452 | .333 | .818 | 2.8 | .5 | .1 | .1 | 4.9 |
| Chasson Randle^{†} | 8 | 0 | 9.3 | .462 | .400 | 1.000 | .6 | .8 | .4 | .1 | 5.3 |
| Alex Poythress | 6 | 1 | 26.2 | .463 | .316 | .800 | 4.8 | .8 | .5 | .3 | 10.7 |
| Jerryd Bayless | 3 | 1 | 23.7 | .344 | .400 | .900 | 4.0 | 4.3 | .0 | .0 | 11.0 |
| Justin Harper | 3 | 0 | 10.3 | .417 | .286 | | 1.7 | .7 | .0 | .0 | 4.0 |
| Jerami Grant^{†} | 2 | 0 | 20.5 | .353 | .000 | .500 | 3.0 | .0 | .0 | 2.0 | 8.0 |

- ^{†} Denotes player spent time with another team in the season. Stats reflect time with the 76ers only.

== Transactions ==
=== Trades ===
July 15, 2016
To Philadelphia 76ers

Sasha Kaun
Cash Considerations
To Cleveland Cavaliers

Draft rights to Chukwudiebere Maduabum
August 26, 2016
To Philadelphia 76ers

Tibor Pleiß
Two 2017 second-round picks
cash considerations
To Utah Jazz

Kendall Marshall
November 1, 2016
To Philadelphia 76ers

Ersan İlyasova
One 2017 Protected first-round pick
To Oklahoma City Thunder

Jerami Grant
February 22, 2017
To Philadelphia 76ers

Tiago Splitter
Two 2017 second-round picks
To Atlanta Hawks

Ersan İlyasova
February 23, 2017
To Philadelphia 76ers

Andrew Bogut
Justin Anderson
One 2017 second-round pick

One 2018 second-round pick

To Dallas Mavericks

Nerlens Noel

=== Free agents ===
==== Additions ====
| Player | Signed | Former Team |
|---|---|---|
| Jerryd Bayless | Signed 3-year contract worth $26 million | Milwaukee Bucks |
| Gerald Henderson Jr. | Signed 2-year $18 million deal | Portland Trail Blazers |
| Sergio Rodríguez | Signed 1-year $6.8 million contract | (Spain) Real Madrid Baloncesto |
| Dario Šarić | Signed 5-year deal worth $15 million | (Turkey) Anadolu Efes |
| James Webb III | Signed 3-year non-guaranteed | Boise State Broncos |
| Shawn Long | Signed 3-year deal worth $3.7 million (non-guaranteed) | Louisiana–Lafayette Ragin' Cajuns |
| Brandon Paul | Signed 3-year non-guaranteed deal | Illinois Fighting Illini |
| Cat Barber | Signed 3-year non-guaranteed contract | North Carolina State Wolfpack |
| Chasson Randle | Signed two 10-day contracts / 3-year deal | Westchester Knicks |

==== Subtractions ====
| Player | Reason Left | New Team |
|---|---|---|
| Ish Smith | Signed 3-year contract worth $24 million | Detroit Pistons |
| Christian Wood | Signed 2-year contract | Charlotte Hornets |
| Carl Landry | Waived | Unknown (free agent) |
| Elton Brand | Player Retired | Retired |
| Hollis Thompson | Waived | Austin Spurs |
| Nerlens Noel | Traded | Dallas Mavericks |
| Chasson Randle | Waived | New York Knicks |
| Andrew Bogut | Waived | Cleveland Cavaliers |
