= 7 (disambiguation) =

7 is a number, numeral, and glyph.

7 or seven commonly refers to:

- AD 7, the seventh year of the AD era
- 7 BC, the seventh year before the AD era
- The month of July

7 or seven may also refer to:

== Music ==
=== Artists ===
- Seven (Swiss singer) (born 1978), a Swiss recording artist
- Seven (Korean singer) (born 1984), a South Korean recording artist
- Se7en (American singer) (born 1986), the former stage name of Sevyn Streeter
- Mick Thomson or #7, an American recording artist
- Seven (band), a British AOR band
- The Seven (band), a late 1960s rock band from Syracuse, New York
- S Club 7, a British pop group

=== Albums ===
- 7 (Apoptygma Berzerk album), 1996
- 7 (Beach House album), 2018
- 7 (Big Wreck album), 2023
- 7 (Bushido album), 2007
- 7 (Con Funk Shun album), 1981
- 7 (David Guetta album), 2018
- 7 (David Meece album), 1985
- 7 (Enrique Iglesias album), 2003
- 7 (George Strait album), 1986
- 7, by Kotiteollisuus, 2005
- 7 (Lil Nas X EP), 2019
- 7, by Los Pericos, 2005
- 7 (Madness album), 1981
- 7 (Michalis Hatzigiannis album), 2008
- 7... (Mint Condition album), 2011
- 7 (Nancy Ajram album), 2010
- 7 (Nelly Furtado album), 2024
- 7 (O.S.T.R. album), 2006
- 7 (Platero y Tú album), 1997
- 7 (S Club 7 album), 2000
- 7 (Sanna Nielsen album), 2014
- 7 (Seal album), 2015
- 7 (Sixx:A.M. EP), 2011
- 7 (Talisman album), 2006
- 7 (U2 EP), 2002
- 7 (Zap Mama album), 1997
- 7: The Best of Stryper, 2003
- Seven (Bob Seger album), 1974
- Seven (Brooke Ligertwood album), 2022
- Seven (Enuff Z'nuff album), 1997
- Seven (James album), 1992
- Seven (Janno Gibbs album), 2004
- Seven (Lisa Stansfield album), 2014
- Seven (Mors Principium Est album), 2020
- Seven (Mustafa Sandal album), 2003
- Seven (Night Ranger album), 1998
- Seven (Poco album), 1974
- Seven (Soft Machine album), 1973
- Seven (Suns of Arqa album), 1987
- Seven (Tony Banks album), 2004
- Seven (Winger album), 2023
- Seven (Wolfstone album), 1999
- Number 7 (Commissioned album), 1991, by Commissioned
- Number Seven (Phideaux Xavier album), 2009
- Number Seven (Will Hoge album), 2011
- Map of the Soul: 7, 2020, by BTS

=== Songs ===
- "7" (Prince song), 1992, by Prince and the New Power Generation
- "7" (Shizuka Kudō song), 1995
- "7" (Catfish and the Bottlemen song), 2016
- "Seven" (Sunny Day Real Estate song), 1994
- "Seven" (David Bowie song), 1999
- "Seven" (Kōji Wada song), 1999
- "Seven" (Mika Nakashima song), 2004
- "Seven" (Fever Ray song), 2009
- "Seven" (Taylor Swift song), 2020
- "Seven" (Jungkook song), 2023
- "7", 1999, by Moby from Play
- "Seven", 1999, by Karma to Burn from Wild, Wonderful Purgatory
- "Seven", 1999, by Megadeth from Risk
- "Seven", 2003, by This Day Forward from In Response
- "Seven", 2007, by Army of the Pharaohs from Ritual of Battle
- "Seven", 2007, by Symphony X from Paradise Lost
- "Seven", 2007, by Tijuana Sweetheart from Public Display of Infection
- "Seven", 2008, by They Might Be Giants from Here Come the 123s
- "Seven", 2009, by Dave Matthews Band from Big Whiskey & the GrooGrux King
- "Seven", 2009, by Tyler, the Creator from Bastard
- "Seven", 2011, by Erra from Impulse
- "Seven", 2013, by Psapp from What Makes Us Glow
- "Seven", 2015, by Phinehas from Till the End
- "The Seven", 2017, by Primus from The Desaturating Seven

== Film and television ==
=== Films ===
- Seven (1979 film), action film directed by Andy Sidaris
- Seven (1995 film), thriller directed by David Fincher, often stylized as "Se7en"
- Seven (2019 Indian film), thriller directed by Nizar Shafi
- Seven (2019 Nigerian film)

=== Television ===
- Seven Network or Channel Seven, an Australian free-to-air network
- Seven (UK TV channel), an independent local station in North and North East Lincolnshire, England
- Seven (TV series), an Indian television series
- @Seven, a New Zealand comedy and news show
- "The Seven", a 1996 episode of Seinfeld
- Seven, a character on Married... with Children
- Seven, a character in the film 9
- Sjuan, The Seven, a Swedish television channel
- The Seven, the Friday and Weekend Counterpart of BBC Scotland's The Nine
- The Seven, a team of corrupt superheroes and the main antagonists of the Amazon Prime series The Boys
- The Seven, a 2021 season of actual play show Dimension 20
- "Seven", a 2026 episode of A Knight of the Seven Kingdoms

== Other arts and media ==
- Seven (play), a 2008 documentary play based on the lives of seven women campaigners
- The Seven (play), by Will Power
- The Seven (A Song of Ice and Fire), fictional deity from A Song of Ice and Fire by George R. R. Martin
- 7 (sculpture), by Richard Serra, in Doha, Qatar
- Seven (novel), by Farzana Doctor
- Seven on 7, a 2021 promotional web series
- Seven, a character in the Adventure Time episode "Walnuts & Rain"
- Josei Seven, a Japanese women's magazine
- Seven (animation studio), a Japanese animation studio

== Transportation ==
=== Automobiles ===
- Austin 7, a 1922–1939 British economy car
- BMW 7 Series, a 1977–present German full-size luxury sedan
- Chery Arrizo 7, a 2013–present Chinese mid-size sedan
- Chery Tiggo 7, a 2016–present Chinese compact SUV
- Haima 7, a 2010–2013 Chinese compact SUV
- Huasong 7, a 2014–present Chinese MPV
- Lotus Seven, 1957–1973 British sports car
  - Caterham 7, a 1973–present British sports car based on the Lotus Seven
- Omoda 7, a 2024–present electric compact crossover SUV
- Qoros 7, a 2020–present Chinese mid-size SUV
- Toyota 7, a 1970 racing car

=== Transportation lines ===
- 7 (Los Angeles Railway), a line of the Los Angeles Railway from 1932 to 1956
- 7 (New York City Subway service), a line of the New York City Subway
- Line 7 (disambiguation)
- List of public transport routes numbered 7

=== Watercraft ===
- USS Seven (SP-727), a US Navy patrol boat in commission from 1917 to 1918

== Technology ==
=== Cameras ===
- Konica Minolta Maxxum 7D, an A-mount digital SLR camera
- Minolta DiMAGE 7, a digital bridge camera
- Minolta Maxxum 7, an A-mount 35mm film camera
- Sony α7, an E-mount digital mirrorless camera

=== Software ===
- Windows 7, an operating system by Microsoft
- Seven: The Days Long Gone, a role-playing video game
- Mario Kart 7, a kart racing video game

== Other uses ==
- 7, a letter in Squamish language orthography, which is used to represent the glottal stop
- 7, used to transcribe ḥāʾ / heth (ح) and ḫāʾ (خ) in the Arabic chat alphabet
- Seven (brand), an Indian clothing company
- No. 7 (brand), a range of cosmetics sold by the retailer Boots UK
- River Seven, a river in North Yorkshire, England
- Kevin Fertig, a wrestler who uses the names 'Seven' and 'Kevin Thorn'
- Dustin Rhodes or Seven, a professional wrestler
- Trent Seven, British wrestler
- Seven McGee (born 2003), American football player
- 7 Up, a soda beverage
- The international calling code for Russia and neighboring countries
- 7 Iris, an asteroid in the asteroid belt
- Seven Sleepers, early Christian saints and Qur'anic figures

== See also ==
- 07 (disambiguation)
- 007 (disambiguation)
- 7 and 7, a mixed cocktail drink
- 7-inch single (7-inch vinyl)
- 7 Up (disambiguation)
- Black Seven (disambiguation)
- No. 7 (disambiguation)
- Seven of Nine, a character in Star Trek: Voyager, referred to as "Seven"
- Sevens (disambiguation)
- Channel 7 (disambiguation)
- Magnificent Seven (disambiguation)
- Network seven (disambiguation)
- Seven Sisters (disambiguation)
- Seven Wonders (disambiguation)
- Seven Samurai (disambiguation)
- VII (disambiguation), the Roman numeral for 7
- Severn (disambiguation)
- Se7en (disambiguation)
- The character ⁊
- SVN, a British pop band featuring Aimie Atkinson and Jarnéia Richard-Noel from the cast of SIX
