= Severn (disambiguation) =

Severn most commonly refers to the River Severn, the longest in the United Kingdom.

Severn may also refer to:

== Bodies of water ==
=== Australia ===
- Severn River (New South Wales)
- Severn River (Queensland)

=== Canada ===
- Severn River (Georgian Bay), a river in central Ontario
- Severn Sound, the embayment of Georgian Bay that river flows into
- Severn River (Hudson Bay), a river in northern Ontario

=== New Zealand ===
- Severn River (New Zealand)

=== United Kingdom ===
- River Severn, the longest river in the United Kingdom
- Severn Estuary, the estuary of that river
- Bristol Channel, also known as the Severn Sea, the stretch of water to the west of the estuary
- River Seven, a river in North Yorkshire, England

=== United States ===
- Severn River (Maryland)
- Severn River (Virginia)

== Places ==
=== Canada ===
- Severn, Ontario and Port Severn, both located on Severn Sound
- Fort Severn, a Hudson's Bay Company post at the mouth of the Severn River in northern Ontario
- Fort Severn Airport, Ontario, Canada
- Fort Severn First Nation, the northernmost community in Ontario
- Severn Bridge, Ontario, Canada

=== United Kingdom ===
- Severn Beach, South Gloucestershire, England
- Severn (Caldicot ward), an electoral ward in Monmouthshire, Wales
- Severn Stoke

=== United States ===
- Severn, Maryland, a census-designated place
- Severn, North Carolina, a town
- Fort Severn, one of the three original military bases that now make up the United States Naval Academy

== People ==
=== People with the given name ===
- Severn Cullis-Suzuki (born 1979), environmental activist, speaker, television host and author
- Severn Darden (1929–1995), American comedian
- Severn Teackle Wallis (1816–1894), American lawyer

=== People with the surname ===
- Christopher Severn (born 1935), American former screen actor
- Claud Severn (1869–1933), British colonial governor of Hong Kong, son of Walter Severn
- Cliff Severn (1925-2014), American cricketer and child screen actor
- Dan Severn (born 1958), American martial artist and professional wrestler
- Edmund Severn (1862–1942), American violinist and composer
- Ernest Severn (1933-1987), American child screen actor
- James Severn (born 1991), English association footballer
- John Severn (1781–1875), English politician
- Joseph Severn (1793–1879), English portrait and subject painter
- Raymond Severn (1930-1994), American cricketer and child screen actor
- Walter Severn (1830–1904), English watercolour artist, son of Joseph Severn
- William Severn (1938-1983), American child screen actor
- Winston Severn (born 1942), American former cricketer and child screen actor
- Yvonne Severn (1927-2006), American child screen actress

=== People with the title ===
- Prince Edward, Duke of Edinburgh (born 1964) has the title Viscount Severn as one of his subsidiary titles.

== Arts, entertainment, and media ==
- Severn Sound, a UK independent radio station that broadcast throughout Gloucestershire, which was renamed Heart Gloucestershire in 2008
- Severn Valley (Cthulhu Mythos), a fictional setting in the writings of Ramsey Campbell
- The Severn (radio), a radio station serving Shrewsbury and Oswestry, England

== Ships ==
- HMS Severn, the name of nine ships and one submarine of the Royal Navy
- Severn-class lifeboat, the largest class of lifeboat used by the RNLI
- SS Severn River
- USS Severn, the name of four ships of the United States Navy

== Other uses ==
- Severn, a codename of an early beta version of the Fedora operating system, then known as Red Hat Linux 9.0.93
- Severn School, an independent preparatory school in Severna Park, Maryland

== See also ==
- Seven (disambiguation)
- Severny (disambiguation)
- Penny Severns (1952–1998), American politician, member of the Illinois Senate
- Virgil Severns (1929–2024), American high jumper
