= 1910 in literature =

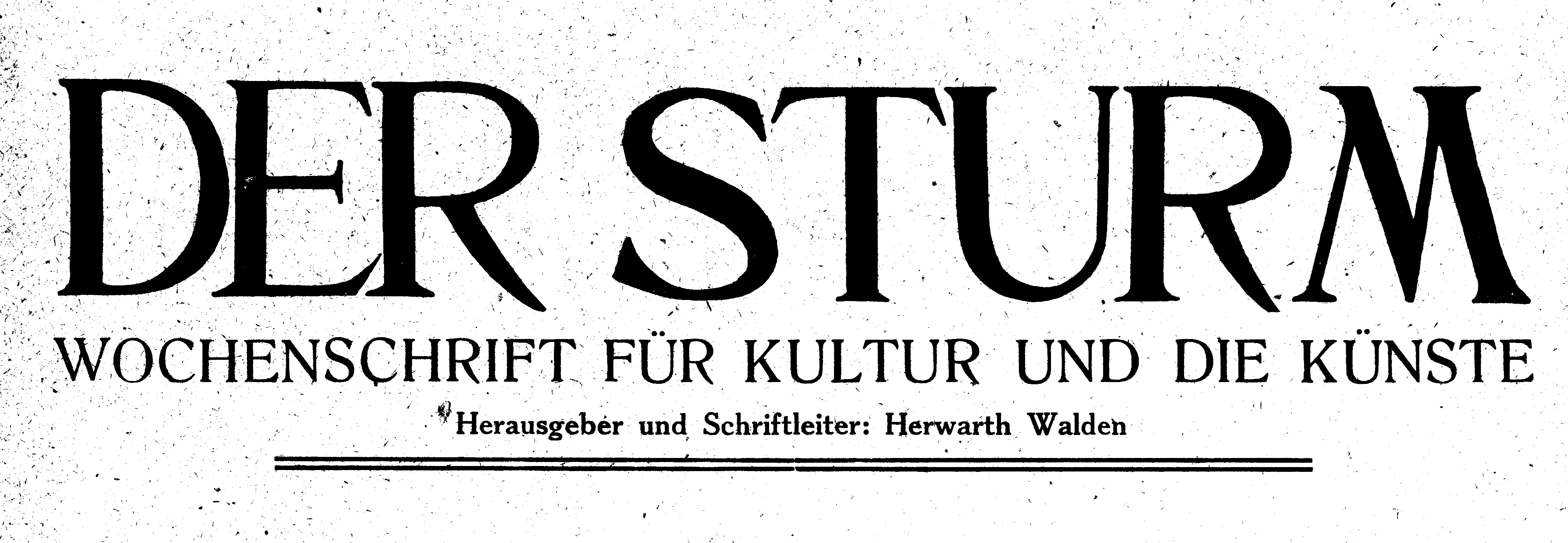

This article contains information about the literary events and publications of 1910.

== Events ==
- January 8 – The serialisation of Gaston Leroux's novel The Phantom of the Opera (Le Fantôme de l'Opéra) concludes in the Paris newspaper Le Gaulois.
- January 30 – Uncle Wiggily Longears, a rheumatic rabbit created by Howard R. Garis, makes his debut in the Newark News (U.S.)
- March – Lesotho author Thomas Mofolo completes his novel Chaka; he leaves Morija suddenly and it is not published until 1925.
- March 18 – The first movie version of Mary Shelley's Frankenstein (1818) is released in the U.S. by Edison Studios. One of the first horror films, it features unbilled the actor Charles Ogle as the monster.
- March 30 – William Johnston and Paul West's novel The Innocent Murderers is published in New York City, as the first work of academic crime fiction.
- April 20 – Halley's Comet reappears after 76 years, and Mark Twain dies at his home, Stormfield, the day after the comet's perihelion. In his autobiography, Twain wrote, "I came in with Halley's comet in 1835. It's coming again next year (1910), and I expect to go out with it. The Almighty has said no doubt, 'Now here are these two unaccountable freaks; they came in together, they must go out together.'"
- August 11 – The Buenos Aires Convention is signed, providing for international recognition of copyright.
- September – G. K. Chesterton's fictional detective Father Brown makes a first U.K. appearance in the short story "The Blue Cross" in the Story-Teller magazine (London), having previously appeared on June 23 as "Valentin Follows a Curious Trail" in The Saturday Evening Post (Philadelphia).
- September 1 – Herbert Beerbohm Tree's elaborate revival of Shakespeare's Henry VIII opens in London. It will run for 254 consecutive performances.
- October – Filippo Tommaso Marinetti's first novel Mafarka il futurista is cleared of obscenity charges.
- Fall – Damon Runyon begins working as a journalist on The New York American.
- November 20 – Russian novelist Leo Tolstoy dies of pneumonia aged 82 at Astapovo railway station, after a day's train journey south, fleeing from his home.
- Ongoing – Boris Pasternak drops out of the Moscow Conservatory and begins to study law, moving on to study philosophy at the University of Marburg. He also falls in love with Olga Freidenberg.

== New books ==
=== Fiction ===
- C. R. Ashbee – The Building of Thelema
- Florence L. Barclay – The Mistress of Shenstone
- Arnold Bennett – Clayhanger (first volume in the eponymous trilogy – actually four books)
- Oskar Braaten – Kring fabrikken
- Rhoda Broughton – The Devil and the Deep Sea
- John Buchan – Prester John
- Ivan Bunin – The Village («Деревня», Derévnya, originally published as Novelet («Повесть»))
- Gilbert Cannan – Devious Ways
- Dikran Chökürian – Hayreni dzayner (Հայրենի Ձայներ)
- Colette – La Vagabonde
- William T. Cox – Fearsome Creatures of the Lumberwoods
- Walter de la Mare – The Return
- Grazia Deledda – Sino al confine (Until the border)
- Jeffery Farnol – The Broad Highway
- Douglas Morey Ford – The Raid of Dover: A Romance of the Reign of Woman: A.D. 1940
- E. M. Forster – Howards End
- Zane Grey – The Heritage of the Desert
- Gerhart Hauptmann – Der Narr in Christo Emanuel Quint (The Fool in Christ, Emanuel Quint)
- Hermann Hesse – Gertrud
- Gaston Leroux – Un Homme dans la nuit
- Hermann Löns – Der Wehrwolf (The Warwolf)
- Lu Shi'e – Xin Zhongguo (新中國, New China)
- Iain MacCormaic – Dùn Aluinn (serialization)
- Karin Michaëlis – Den farlige Alder (The Dangerous Age)
- Thomas Mofolo – Pitseng
- Natsume Sōseki (夏目 漱石) – The Gate (Mon 門)
- Martin Andersen Nexø – Pelle the Conqueror (final volume)
- E. Phillips Oppenheim – The Golden Web
- Baroness Orczy
  - Lady Molly of Scotland Yard
  - Petticoat Government
- John Oxenham – A Maid of the Silver Sea
- Louis Pergaud – De Goupil à Margot (short stories)
- Aleksey Remizov – The Indefatigable Cymbal
- Rainer Maria Rilke – The Notebooks of Malte Laurids Brigge (Die Aufzeichnungen des Malte Laurids Brigge)
- Mary Roberts Rinehart – The Window at the White Cat
- J.-H. Rosny aîné – La Mort de la Terre
- Fráňa Šrámek – Stříbrný vítr
- Katherine Thurston – Max
- Edgar Wallace – The Nine Bears
- Mary Augusta Ward – Canadian Born
- H. G. Wells
  - The History of Mr Polly
  - The New Machiavelli (serialization)
- Elin Wägner – Pennskaftet
- Jerzy Żuławski – Zwycięzca (The Conqueror), second of the Trylogia Księżycowa (Lunar Trilogy)

=== Children and young people ===
- Victor Appleton – Tom Swift and His Motor Cycle
- L. Frank Baum
  - The Emerald City of Oz
  - Aunt Jane's Nieces in Society (as Edith Van Dyne)
- Thornton Burgess – Old Mother West Wind
- Frances Hodgson Burnett – The Secret Garden
- Grace James – Japanese Fairy Tales
- Rudyard Kipling – Rewards and Fairies
- Walter de la Mare – The Three Mulla Mulgars (also The Three Royal Monkeys)
- John Masefield – A Book of Discoveries
- Lucy Maud Montgomery – Kilmeny of the Orchard
- E. Nesbit – The Magic City
- Peter Newell – The Slant Book
- Beatrix Potter – The Tale of Mrs. Tittlemouse

=== Drama ===
- Hall Caine
  - The Bishop's Son (new version of Ben-my-Chree)
  - The Eternal Question (new version of The Eternal City)
- George Diamandy
  - Bestia (The Beast)
  - Tot înainte (Carry On)
- Maxim Gorky – Reception («Встреча», Vstrecha; also published as Children («Дети», Deti))
- Terence MacSwiney – The Last Warriors of Coole
- Maurice Maeterlinck – Mary Magdalene
- Eduardo Marquina – En Flandes se ha puesto el sol (The Sun Has Set in Flanders)
- John Masefield – The Tragedy of Pompey the Great
- Louis N. Parker – Pomander Walk
- Edmond Rostand – Chantecler
- George Bernard Shaw – Misalliance
- J. M. Synge – Deirdre of the Sorrows
- Rabindranath Tagore – Raja (রাজা, The King of the Dark Chamber)

=== Poetry ===
- Paul Claudel – Cinq Grandes Odes
- Rabindranath Tagore – Gitanjali (Bengali language version)

=== Non-fiction ===
- Jane Addams – Twenty Years at Hull House
- Norman Angell – The Great Illusion (revision of Europe's Optical Illusion published 1909)
- Hall Caine – King Edward: A Prince and a Great Man
- G. K. Chesterton – What's Wrong with the World
- Emily Davies – Thoughts on Some Questions Relating to Women
- Sigmund Freud
  - Five Lectures on Psycho-Analysis (Über Psychoanalyse: fünf Vorlesungen gehalten zur 20jährigen Gründungsfeier der Clark University in Worcester Mass., September 1909)
  - Leonardo da Vinci, A Memory of His Childhood (Eine Kindheitserinnerung des Leonardo da Vinci) (essay)
- Emma Goldman – Anarchism and Other Essays
- Robert Hichens – The Spell of Egypt
- Dumitru C. Moruzi – Înstrăinații
- Ezra Pound – The Spirit of Romance
- Gerhard Ritter – Ein historisches Urbild zu Goethes Faust (Agrippa von Nettesheym)
- Henri Stahl – Bucureștii ce se duc
- Percy Sykes – The Glory of the Shia World
- Wallace D. Wattles – The Science of Getting Rich
- Andrew Dickson White – Seven Great Statesmen in the Warfare of Humanity with Unreason
- Alfred North Whitehead and Bertrand Russell – Principia Mathematica, vol. 1

== Births ==
- February 6 – Irmgard Keun, German novelist (died 1982)
- February 10 – Joan G. Robinson, English children's writer and illustrator (died 1988)
- February 11 – L. T. C. Rolt, English biographer and writer of ghost stories (died 1974)
- February 28 – Leonte Răutu, Bessarabian-born Romanian propagandist and censor (died 1993)
- March 4 – Basil Boothroyd, English poet and humorist (died 1988)
- March 22 – Nicholas Monsarrat, English novelist (died 1979)
- May 8 – Andrew E. Svenson, American author and publisher (died 1975)
- May 23 – Margaret Wise Brown, American children's writer (died 1952)
- June 15 – Marie de Garis (Marie Le Messurier), Guernsey ethnographer and lexicographer (died 2010)
- June 21 – Clive Sansom, English-born Tasmanian poet and playwright (died 1981)
- June 23 – Jean Anouilh, French dramatist (died 1987)
- July 14 – Vincent Brome, English biographer and novelist (died 2004)
- July 27 – Julien Gracq, French novelist, critic and playwright (died 2007)
- August 5 – Jacquetta Hawkes (née Hopkins), English writer and archeologist (died 1996)
- August 10 – Vladimir Cavarnali, Bessarabian-born Romanian poet, editor, and journalist (died 1966)
- August 19 – Quentin Bell, English historian and author (died 1996)
- September 8 – Julián Padrón, Venezuelan novelist, journalist and lawyer (died 1954)
- September 11 – Manuel Mujica Láinez, Argentine novelist (died 1984)
- September 18 – Bernard Kangro, Estonian journalist, author, and poet (died 1994)
- September 30 – Edward Hyams, English novelist and historian (died 1975)
- October 15 – Haddis Alemayehu, Ethiopian politician and novelist (died 2003)
- November 9 – P. M. Hubbard, English crime writer (died 1980)
- November 17 – Rachel de Queiroz, Brazilian author (died 2003)
- December 19
  - Jean Genet, French novelist, playwright and poet (died 1986)
  - José Lezama Lima, Cuban writer and poet (died 1976)
- December 24
  - Jean-Paul Crespelle, French writer (died 1994)
  - Fritz Leiber, American writer of fantasy and science fiction (died 1992)
- unknown date – Betty Miller, Irish-born Jewish writer (died 1965)

== Deaths ==
- January 29 – Edouard Rod, French-Swiss novelist (born 1857)
- March 29 – H. Maria George Colby, American writer (born 1844)
- April – Frances Margaret Milne, Irish-born American author and librarian (born 1846)
- April 3 – Catherine Helen Spence, Australian writer (born 1825)
- April 4 – Augusta Harvey Worthen, Australian author and educator (born 1823)
- April 9 – Vittoria Aganoor, Italian poet (born 1855)
- April 15 – Angie F. Newman, American poet, author, and edito (born 1837)
- April 21 – Mark Twain, American writer (born 1835)
- May 7 – Emil Friedrich Kautzsch, German Bible scholar (born 1841)
- May 10 – Anna Laetitia Waring, Welsh poet and hymnist (born 1823)
- May 22 – Jules Renard, French novelist (born 1864)
- July 2 – Frederick James Furnivall, English lexicographer (born 1825)
- August 4 – Heinrich Julius Holtzmann, German New Testament commentator (born 1832)
- August 26 – William James, American philosopher (born 1842)
- September 6 – Susan F. Ferree, American journalist and social reformer (born 1844)
- September 14 – Emma B. Dunham, American poet, author, teacher (born 1826)
- October 17
  - Kurd Lasswitz, German author and physician (born 1848)
  - William Vaughn Moody, American dramatist and poet (born 1869)
  - Julia Ward Howe, American poet and abolitionist (born 1819)
- October 27 – Henrietta Gould Rowe, American litterateur and author (born 1835)
- November 6 – George Panu, Romanian memoirist, literary critic, journalist and politician (born 1848)
- November 15 – Wilhelm Raabe, German novelist (born 1831)
- November 20 – Leo Tolstoy, Russian novelist (born 1828)

== Awards ==
- Nobel Prize for Literature: Paul Johann Ludwig Heyse
- Newdigate prize: Charles Bewley
