= No. 7 =

No. 7 may refer to:

- No. 7 Squadron IAF, an Indian Air Force unit
- No. 7 Squadron RAAF, a Royal Australian Air Force unit
- No. 7 (brand), a brand of beauty product sold by Boots in the UK
- Japanese minesweeper No. 7, the name of several ships
  - W-7-class minesweeper, or No.7-class minesweeper, 1937–1939

== See also ==
- 7 (disambiguation)
