= A Maid of the Silver Sea =

A Maid of the Silver Sea may refer to:

- A Maid of the Silver Sea (novel), a 1910 work by John Oxenham
- A Maid of the Silver Sea (film), 1922 adaptation directed by Guy Newall
