= 7O =

7O or 7-O may refer to:

- 7O, IATA code for Galaxy Air
- 7O-ADJ, tail number for plane involved in Yemenia Flight 626
- 7O, code for Yemen in Aircraft registration codes
- Venezuela's 2012 presidential elections of 7 October
- October 7 attacks

== See also ==
- O7 (disambiguation)
- 70
