= 007 (disambiguation) =

007 is a code name of James Bond, a fictional character in the eponymous series James Bond.

007 may also refer to:

== Arts, entertainment, and media ==
=== Characters ===
- Sir Great Britain (Cyborg 007), a character from the Cyborg 009 franchise
- George O'Malley or 007, a fictional character from Grey's Anatomy
- Nomi or 007, a fictional character from the James Bond film No Time to Die
- Test Subject 007 (被験体"007", Hikentai "Daburu Ō Sebun"), a former name of Anya Forger from Spy × Family

=== Gaming ===
- 007 First Light, a 2026 video game based on James Bond

=== Literature ===
- ".007", a short story by Rudyard Kipling

=== Music and dance ===
- "007 Theme", a musical theme from the James Bond films written by John Barry
- 007 (Wilber Pan album) (2009)
- "007 (Shanty Town)", a song by Desmond Dekker from 007 (Shanty Town)
- 007: The Best of Desmond Dekker, a 2011 compilation album by Desmond Dekker
- Señor 007 a 1966 album by Ray Barretto
- 007, a person who is not a member of a house in ball culture

== Transportation ==
- Tyrrell 007, a 1974 Formula One race car
- BAR 007, a 2005 Formula One race car
- Hycan 007, a mid-size electric SUV
- Zeekr 007, a compact electric sedan
- Dongfeng eπ 007, an electric full-size sedan
- Korean Air Lines Flight 007, a flight shot down in 1983 over Soviet airspace
- LOT Polish Airlines Flight 007, a flight that crashed in 1980, killing Polish singer Anna Jantar and the entire US amateur boxing team

== Other uses ==
- Nong Samet Refugee Camp, or 007 Refugee Camp, a camp on the Thai-Cambodian border
- Microsoft Office 2007 or O07, but sometimes mistaken as 007

== See also ==
- O07 (disambiguation)
- 07 (disambiguation)
- 7 (disambiguation)
