= .007 =

Short story by Rudyard Kipling

- Short story by Rudyard Kipling
- Language: English
- Genre: Short story

Publication
- Published in: August 1897
- Publisher: Scribner's Magazine

".007" (originally subtitled "The Story of an American Locomotive") is a short story by Rudyard Kipling.

== Publication ==
The story first appeared in Scribner's Magazine in August 1897, and was collected with other Kipling stories in The Day's Work (1898).

== Plot ==
The locomotives themselves have personalities and talk in a manner reminiscent of the men who operate them in real life. Humans only appear in the story as seen from the perspective of the engines. The story relates a sort of rite of passage. A fast goods train was derailed by hitting a shoat (young pig) which got on the track, and ended up in a farm field. .007, a "sensitive", new, youthful engine acts in a heroic and manly way pulling the breakdown train, winning him the respect of his fellow engines. At the conclusion, the highest-ranking engine Purple Emperor, a "superb six-wheel-coupled racing-locomotive, who hauled the pride and glory of the road, the millionaires' south-bound express" inducts him into a fraternal organisation:

"I hereby declare and pronounce No. .007 a full and accepted Brother of the Amalgamated Brotherhood of Locomotives, and as such entitled to all shop, switch, track, tank, and round-house privileges throughout my jurisdiction, in the Degree of Superior Flier, it bein' well known and credibly reported to me that our Brother has covered forty-one miles in thirty-nine minutes and a half on an errand of mercy to the afflicted. At a convenient time, I myself will communicate to you the Song and Signal of this Degree whereby you may be recognised in the darkest night. Take your stall, newly entered Brother among Locomotives!"

== Themes ==
".007" is one of a number of stories and poems that Kipling wrote about engines, engineers, and machines. A social history of technology notes Kipling was a pioneer in "establish[ing] the world of work as an appropriate subject for literature" and says,

The affection between Kipling and engineers was mutual. Not only did Kipling use engineers in his plot, but engineers relished his work. He became their unofficial poet laureate.

Another critic notes,

A concern for artificial nature and its beneficent powers is also what attracts [Kipling] to the machine, from which, in turn, we get stories like 'The Ship that Found Herself' and '.007'. To Kipling..., the machine is a major expression of man's ability to understand and control the forces of nature.

Some contemporary reviewers felt he went too far in this story. In a long essay in MacMillan's magazine, "an admirer"—who, judging from his comment on bicycles and horses, does not feel the same way about machines as Kipling—complained,

Here all Mr. Kipling's mania break loose all at once—there is the madness of American slang, the madness of technical jargon, and the madness of believing that silly talk, mostly consisting of moral truisms, is amusing because you put it into the mouths of machines.... It is no doubt true that machines have their idiosyncrasies, their personalities even; a bicycle can be nearly as annoying as a horse. For once in a way it may be good fun to push the fancy a little farther and attribute to them sentient life, but Mr. Kipling has overdone the thing.

== The 007 connection ==
The story is sometimes mentioned speculatively as one of many possible inspirations for 007, the code number of Ian Fleming's fictional detective James Bond, but no connection is known.

== See also ==
- The Little Engine That Could
