= 07 =

07 may refer to:

- The year 2007, or any year ending with 07
- The month of July
- 7 (number)
- FIFA 7
- Madden NFL 07
- Cricket 07
- The number of the French department Ardèche
- The musical duo Zero 7
- 07 zgłoś się, a Polish criminal television series
- 07 (album), 2007, by Nina Badrić
- 07 (Dialing code), a dialing code used by pagers and mobile phones
- Emoticon representing salute
- Plastic recycling marking for resin identification code 7
- Lynk & Co 07, a plug-in hybrid compact sedan 13

== See also ==
- O7 (disambiguation)
- 7 (disambiguation)
- 007 (disambiguation)
