= Yvonne Severn =

American actress

- Born: Yvonne Diana Severn; April 11, 1927; Johannesburg, South Africa
- Died: November 22, 2006 (aged 79); Thousand Oaks, California, U.S.
- Occupation: Actress
- Relatives: Christopher Severn; Clifford Severn; Ernest Severn; Raymond Severn; Venetia Severn; William Severn; Winston Severn

Yvonne Severn (11 April 1927 in Johannesburg – 22 November 2006 in Thousand Oaks) was an American child screen actress.

She had seven siblings who were all child actors: Venetia Severn, Clifford Severn, Raymond Severn, Ernest Severn, Christopher Severn, William Severn and Winston Severn. She married Roy Haskell Shelley (1922-1999).

Yvonne Severn is most known for her film appearances in The Amazing Mrs. Holliday (1943) and, as a princess, with her sister Venetia in Tower of London (1939).

== Selected filmography ==
- Lloyd's of London (1936) - Ann
- Tower of London (1939) - Princess
- The Earl of Chicago (1940) - Village girl
- Eagle Squadron (1942) - Child
- The Amazing Mrs. Holliday (1943) - Orphan
- A Guy Named Joe (1943) - Elizabeth, English girl
- Maisie Goes to Reno (1944) released in UK as You Can't Do That to Me - Eunice Jenks
