= Her Sister's Secret =

1946 film by Edgar George Ulmer

- Theatrical release poster
- Directed by: Edgar G. Ulmer
- Screenplay by: Anne Green
- Based on: Dark Angel; 1934 novel by Gina Kaus
- Produced by: Henry Brash
- Starring: Nancy Coleman; Phillip Reed; Margaret Lindsay; Regis Toomey
- Cinematography: Franz Planer
- Edited by: Jack Ogilvie
- Music by: Hans Sommer
- Production company: Producers Releasing Corporation
- Distributed by: Producers Releasing Corporation
- Release date: September 23, 1946 (United States)
- Running time: 86 minutes
- Country: United States
- Language: English
- Budget: $1 million

Her Sister's Secret is a 1946 American drama film directed by Edgar G. Ulmer and starring Nancy Coleman, Margaret Lindsay, Phillip Reed, and Regis Toomey. It centers around a woman who falls in love with a soldier. Believing she has been abandoned, she gives her baby to her married sister. The picture was produced and distributed by Producers Releasing Corporation. The screenplay was by Anne Green from the novel Dark Angel by Gina Kaus.

== Plot ==
During World War II, Toni Dubois meets soldier Dick Connolly at Pepe's. They have breakfast there the following day, and Dick proposes to Toni, who decides to wait until six weeks have passed before meeting again to see if they truly love each other. However, during the six weeks pause, Dick's leave gets canceled, and Toni believes she was a one night stand because the letter he wrote to her explaining his leave situation becomes lost. Toni decides to visit her sister Renee, who is married to Bill Gordon. When Bill is shipped overseas, Toni reveals she is pregnant from her one night with Dick. As Renee and Bill are unable to have their own child, Renee asks if she can have the baby and tell Bill it is hers. Toni gives birth to a boy, who Renee names Billy. Renee takes the child and Toni agrees not to see little Billy for another three years.

Two years later, Toni stays home with her ill father, Mr. Dubois. Mr. Dubois tells her to not stay home when he dies. When he passes, Toni leaves and heads to Renee's, where she learns from housemaid Etta that Bill and Renee have gone out of town for a while. Toni attempts to take Billy away but Etta stops her. When Bill and Renee return home, Etta tells them of what happened. Meanwhile, Dick is discharged from the army, and he comes to Renee's house looking for Toni. After he leaves, Renee tells Toni that Dick was at her house. Toni insists upon taking Billy back, but Renee refuses, stating that Billy has become her son after two years. Toni tries to take Billy away again, but Billy runs away from Toni in fear, causing Toni to accept that Bill and Renee will raise Billy. Bill reveals that he knew the truth about Billy's birth, and thanks Toni for allowing them to raise him.

== Cast ==
- Nancy Coleman as Antoinette Toni DuBois
- Margaret Lindsay as Renee DuBois Gordon
- Phillip Reed as Richard 'Dick' Connolly
- Felix Bressart as Pepe - New Orleans Cafe Owner
- Regis Toomey as Bill Gordon
- Henry Stephenson as Mr. Dubois
- Fritz Feld as New Orleans Wine Salesman
- Winston Severn as Billy Gordon
- George Meeker as Guy
- Helene Heigh as Etta
- Frances E. Williams as Mathilda (as Frances Williams)
- Rudolph Anders as Birdman
Winston Severn is the only surviving primary cast member.

== Production ==
Directed by Edgar G. Ulmer, Her Sister's Secret was produced by Henry Brash and written by Anne Green. It is based on the novel Dark Angel by Gina Kaus. Working titles for the film were Between Two Sisters and Once and For All.

The film was produced by Producers Releasing Corporation. They increased their usual film budget for Her Sister's Secret, referring to it as their "first million-dollar production" in advertising.

== Release and reception ==
Producers Releasing Corporation released the film in September 1946.

The New York Times wrote of the film, "In fashioning Her Sister's Secret as their first million-dollar production, the film makers at PRC may have been imbued with the theory that soap operas not only affect a lot of people but also sell soap and make money. For the romantic drama, which came to the Gotham yesterday, follows the pattern set by many of those lachrymose radio offerings" and said that "The sets of "Her Sister's Secret" are neat and interesting, attributes, which, sadly enough, can hardly be applied to its story." A reviewer for the Northwest Chicago Film Society opined the film was "a superb melodrama" and that "you won’t soon forget Her Sister’s Secret."

Richard Brody of The New Yorker remarked that "the actors are hardly charismatic, but Ulmer, capturing their frozen energy in the shifting perspective of daringly long takes, infuses them with his rhapsodically compassionate vision." Brody also wrote that "Edgar G. Ulmer cuts loose with a wild creativity that yoked his theatrical imagination to a keen view of the traumatic times," and that Ulmer "wrings the last drop of true emotion from every soap-operatic twist, while also baring the domestic scars of war’s violence, sacrifice, and, above all, silence." Leonard Maltin gave the film two and a half stars, saying that it was a "fair weeper with competent cast."

In 1947, the film was banned in Ireland by Richard Hayes for featuring an unwed mother, a decision which was eventually reversed by the Appeal Board. This reversal was described by Irish film historian Kevin Rockett as "an indication of the slightly more flexible approached being adopted in the post-war years by the Appeal Board."

== Preservation ==
The film was restored by the UCLA Film & Television Archive, with funding provided by The Film Foundation and The Franco-American Cultural Fund. A fine-grain was recently struck from the original nitrate negative, from which a new negative and superb new print were produced. Among other earlier exhibitions, the new print was exhibited at the Museum of Modern Art in New York City in November 2014.
