= 7 Train =

7 Train can refer to:

- 7 (New York City Subway service)
  - 7 Subway Extension, added to this route in 2015
- Paris Metro Line 7
- Line 7, Moscow Metro
- Line 7, Beijing Subway
- Line 7, Shanghai Metro
- Seoul Subway Line 7

== See also ==
- Line 7 (disambiguation)
