= Magnificent Seven =

Magnificent Seven or Magnificent 7 may refer to:

== Media ==
=== Film ===
- The Magnificent Seven, a 1960 western film
- Return of The Magnificent Seven, a 1966 western film
- Guns of the Magnificent Seven, a 1969 western film
- The Magnificent Seven Deadly Sins, a 1971 motion picture
- The Magnificent Seven Ride!, a 1972 western film
- The Magnificent Seven (2016 film), a 2016 remake of the 1960 western film
- Magnificent 7, a 2005 television film based on the family of English writer Jacqui Jackson

=== Music ===
- The Magnificent 7 (album), by The Supremes and The Four Tops
- "The Magnificent Seven" (song), a single by The Clash

=== Television ===
- The Magnificent Seven (1998 TV series), a 1998–2000 television series based on the 1960 film
- The Magnificent Seven (American TV series), an upcoming TV series based on the 1960 film

==== Episodes ====
- "Magnificent Seven", a 1993 episode of the Fox Network sitcom Married... with Children
- "The Magnificent Seven" (Supernatural), a 2007 episode of the television series

== Sports ==
- Magnificent Seven (gymnastics), 1996 United States Olympic Women's Gymnastics Team
- The Magnificent Seven (professional wrestling), a group of WCW professional wrestling heels in 2001
- The Magnificent Seven, an alternative nickname to the Unsinkable Seven, the seven survivor competitors of the 1963 and 1968 East African Safari Rally
- Magnificent Seven, two nicknames of thoroughbred horse racing meetings in which jockeys achieved seven victories in a single day:
  - Frankie Dettori at Ascot Racecourse, 1996
  - Richard Hughes (jockey) at Windsor Racecourse, 2012

== Others ==
- Magnificent Seven cemeteries, a group of London cemeteries constructed in the 19th century
- The Magnificent Seven, a set of seven attainment badges created by Scouting Ireland S.A.I. in the late 1990s
- The Magnificent Seven (neutron stars), a nickname for a group of nearby isolated neutron stars
- Magnificent Seven elephants, a set of bull elephants with particularly large tusks living in Kruger National Park
- Magnificent Seven (Port of Spain), a group of mansions located in northern Port of Spain, Trinidad and Tobago
- The Magnificent Seven or "Mag 7", a group of high-performing US Big Tech stocks

== See also ==
- MAG-7, a model of shotgun
