= Se7en (disambiguation) =

Se7en is a 1995 American thriller film.

Se7en or SE7EN may also refer to:

- Seven (comic book), stylized as SE7EN, 2008 comic book based on the film
- Sevyn Streeter (born 1986), known as Se7en, singer of American group RichGirl
- Seven (South Korean singer), stylized as Se7en, stage name of Choi Dong-wook (born 1984)
- Se7en, stage name of David Gallegos, former singer of American group Brokencyde
- Se7en, a ring name of professional wrestler Dustin Rhodes
- Headshots: Se7en, a 2005 remaster compilation album by the band Atmosphere

== See also ==
- 7 (disambiguation), also includes Seven
