= The Day's Work =

1898 collection of short stories by Rudyard Kipling

- Author: Rudyard Kipling
- Language: English
- Genre: Short Story anthology
- Publisher: Macmillan Publishers
- Publication date: 1898
- Publication place: United Kingdom
- Media type: Print

The Day's Work is a collection of short stories by Rudyard Kipling. It was first published in 1898. There are no poems included between the different stories in The Day's Work, as there are in many other of Kipling's collections.

== Contents ==
The book contains 13 short stories, which were mainly written between 1893 and 1896 while Kipling was living in Vermont. Four of the stories contained in The Day's Work include anthropomorphic characters.

1. "The Bridge-Builders"
2. "A Walking Delegate"
3. "The Ship that Found Herself"
4. "The Tomb of His Ancestors"
5. "The Devil and the Deep Sea"
6. "William the Conqueror - part I"
7. "William the Conqueror - part II"
8. ".007"
9. "The Maltese Cat"
10. "Bread upon the Waters"
11. "An Error in the Fourth Dimension"
12. "My Sunday at Home"
13. "The Brushwood Boy"

== See also ==
- List of the works of Rudyard Kipling
- 1898 in literature
