= The Ship that Found Herself =

Short story by Rudyard Kipling, 1895

- Short story by Rudyard Kipling
- Country: United Kingdom
- Language: English
- Genre: Short story

Publication
- Published in: The Idler
- Publication type: Magazine
- Publication date: December 1895

"The Ship that Found Herself" is a short story by Rudyard Kipling, first published in The Idler in 1895. It was collected with other Kipling stories in The Day's Work (1898).

The Dimbula, a cargo ship, makes her first voyage from Liverpool to New York. During the storm the ship encounters, the various parts of the vessel—each with a distinct personality—talk and argue with one another until, by the end of the voyage, they have learned to cooperate effectively.

== Story summary ==
Before the Dimbula leaves Liverpool, the owner's daughter, Miss Frazier, who named the ship when she was launched in Scotland, enthuses about the ship to the captain. He is more cautious, and says: "She has to find herself yet. It's the way wi' ships, Miss Frazier. She's all here, but the parrts of her have not learned to work together yet. They've had no chance.... We can no more than drive and steer her, and so forth; but if we have rough weather this trip - it's likely - she'll learn the rest by heart!"

The ship encounters heavy seas during the voyage to New York, and the parts of the ship, being strained, complain about the conditions, and about the behaviour of neighbouring parts. The deck-beams, the stringers, the garboard-strake, the triple-expansion engine and other parts, have particular functions, and their characters are correspondingly distinct. The stringers "always consider themselves most important, because they are so long," while the garboard-strake claims, "I'm twice as thick as most of the others, so I ought to know something." The Steam, who "had been to sea many times before... he used to spend his leisure ashore in a cloud, or a gutter," frequently comments on the conditions and various complaints.

As the Dimbula enter the Port of New York, the ship's parts stop talking and after a long silence there is a "new, big voice.... The Steam knew what had happened at once; for when a ship finds herself all the talking of the separate parts ceases and melts into one voice, which is the soul of the ship."

== Commentary ==
A commentator writes "From the standpoint of world history, two of Britain's most important activities in the nineteenth century were those of industrialism and imperialism, both of which had been neglected by literature prior to Kipling's advent." In "stories like 'The Ship that Found Herself' and 'Bread upon the Waters' (The Day's Work)... he shows imaginative sympathy with the machines themselves as well as sympathy with the men who serve them."
