= O07 =

O07 may refer to:

- Microsoft Office 2007
- Westheimer Air Park (FAA airport code O07), Fort Bend County, Texas, USA; see List of airports in Texas
- Zhongxiao Xinsheng metro station (station code O07), Taipei, Taiwan
- Ōsakajōkōen Station (JR station code O07), Jōtō-ku, Osaka, Japan

== See also ==
- 007 (disambiguation)
- o7 (disambiguation)
