= The Man from Down Under =

1943 film by Robert Zigler Leonard

- Directed by: Robert Z. Leonard
- Written by: Wells Root; Tom Seller
- Story by: Mary Kelly; Bogart Rogers
- Produced by: Orville O. Dull; Robert Z. Leonard
- Starring: Charles Laughton; Binnie Barnes; Richard Carlson; Donna Reed
- Cinematography: Sidney Wagner
- Edited by: George White
- Music by: David Snell
- Production company: MGM
- Distributed by: Metro-Goldwyn-Mayer
- Release date: August 4, 1943
- Running time: 103 minutes
- Country: United States
- Language: English
- Budget: $954,000
- Box office: $1,070,000

The Man from Down Under is an American 1943 drama film starring Charles Laughton as an Australian man who raises two war orphans.

== Plot ==
After the end of World War I, Australian soldier Jocko Wilson (Charles Laughton) admires the spirit of a destitute Belgian orphan who fights a larger boy. He feeds the child, whom he names "Nipper", and the boy's younger sister Mary. When he receives orders to go home, he gets his friend Ginger Gaffney (Clyde Cook) to smuggle the pair aboard their ship. Then, realizing he knows nothing about raising children, he proposes to his singer girlfriend Aggie Dawlins (Binnie Barnes). She accepts. However, he gets drunk and is nearly arrested; in the confusion, he forgets and sails home without her.

An ex-boxer, Jocko buys a tavern and trains the boy to fight, while Mary is sent off to a boarding school. The adult Nipper (Richard Carlson) gets to fight the boxing champion of the British Empire for the title. Jocko takes all bets, even after Ginger warns him he cannot cover them all if Nipper loses. Mary (Donna Reed) graduates and returns home.

In the title fight, Nipper is holding his own until he is sent crashing out of the ring. When he gets back in, he realizes he has injured his shoulder and cannot use one arm. Nevertheless, knowing Jocko's financial peril, Nipper knocks out the champion. Afterward, the doctor informs Jocko privately that Nipper may never be able to fight again, but Jocko keeps this from his boy.

With his profits, Jocko buys an isolated hotel in Northern Australia, where Nipper recuperates. Local priest Father Ploycarp (Arthur Shields) believes he can heal Nipper's shoulder. The hotel remains empty, leaving Jocko in dire financial trouble once again. One day, a guest finally shows up. To Jocko's surprise, it is Aggie, now a rich widow. She lends him money, not only to pay his creditors, but also to lose gambling with her. Finally, in desperation, Jocko wagers his hotel against all he owes her on a game of craps. He loses, and Aggie gets her revenge for being left at the altar.

When Nipper sees his reporter friend "Dusty" Rhodes (Stephen McNally), who had covered his fight, go off with Mary to ask her to marry him, he becomes furious and beats the man up. Only then does he realize that his feelings for Mary go far beyond a brother's affections. He decides to leave without explanation, causing a rupture with Jocko, who had set up a match against the world champion after seeing that Nipper's shoulder has healed.

Then World War II breaks out. To Jocko's shame, Ginger is accepted but he is not when they go to re-enlist in the army. He pretends to Mary and Aggie that he is an officer, but actually takes a construction job to help the war effort. By chance, he is in the neighborhood when the hotel is attacked by Japanese bombers. He races to the place and encounters Nipper, now a soldier, who has had the same idea. They find the establishment under the control of the crew of a bomber that had crashed nearby. They kill all the Japanese airmen and rescue Aggie, Mary, and the children being sheltered there.

Aggie has some unexpected good news for Nipper. Mary's description of a recurring nightmare of the day her parents were killed (with Nipper absent from her dream) had set Aggie to investigating. Confirmation had finally arrived from Belgium. Nipper and Mary are not siblings after all; she had merely been adopted by Nipper's parents. Now there is nothing to stand in the way of the couple's happiness.

== Cast ==
- Charles Laughton as Jocko Wilson
- Binnie Barnes as Aggie Dawlins
- Richard Carlson as "Nipper" Wilson
- Donna Reed as Mary Wilson
- Christopher Severn as "Nipper" as a child
- Raymond Severn as "Nipper" age 12
- Ernest Severn as tough boy
- Clyde Cook as Ginger Gaffney
- Stephen McNally as "Dusty" Rhodes (as Horace McNally)
- Arthur Shields as Father Polycarp
- Evelyn Falke as Mary as a child
- Hobart Cavanaugh as Boots
- André Charlot as Father Antoine

== Production ==
=== Development ===
The film was based on a story by Mark Kelly and Bogart Rogers which was originally bought by MGM in May 1942 as a vehicle for Wallace Beery.

Eventually the movie was assigned to Charles Laughton. A young director had been meant to direct but Laughton had just worked with Robert Leonard on Stand By for Action and insisted he direct. Binnie Barnes and Gracie Fields were discussed for the female lead – eventually the filmmakers went with Barnes. MGM contractee Donna Reed was given the female lead.

The cast featured an Australian actor, Clyde Cook. The cast included three brothers in the roles of children: Christopher, Raymond and Ernest Severn.

=== Shooting ===
Lon Jones, an Australian journalist doing a lecture tour of the US, acted as technical adviser for life in Australia. Jones wrote an article on the making of the film where he quoted Laughton:

This role scares me. I know how Australians regard their Anzacs, and I also know that the rest of the world looks upon them as the greatest fighting force of modern times. Frankly, I have never worried so much about a film role in all my career.... I am just a fat, ugly pig in real life, and nothing can change that rather deplorable fact. I am one of those unfortunate actors who have to depend solely on their dramatic ability to create a transition on the screen or stage. I only hope that Australians generally will accept me for my acting in this role and forget about my looks.

Laughton said that one of his biggest problems was that he had never actually come into contact with Anzacs, and that he had only known a few Australians intimately.

I have had no way of getting the 'feel' of the character except from the script. I know Australians have become a race apart, fiercely independent and intensely proud. But never having lived among them I have never had the chance of getting io know their characteristics and their mannerisms. I realise only too well that if I should fail in this role I will make enemies of millions of Australians, and that is something I do not look forward to.

Laughton decided to use a version of his own accent rather than approximate an Australian one because "I know Australians are very sensitive about their accent, and I don't want to antagonise them by faking an accent that would sound like a London Cockney."

A number of silent era film stars appeared in small roles in the movie, such as William Desmond, May McEvoy, Florence Turner, Lillian Rich, Barbara Bedford, and Helen Holmes.

Major Sam Harris was technical adviser for the military sequences.

Leonard wanted to build a replica of Sydney Stadium for the boxing sequences but the studio ruled that would be too expensive and also require the permission of the managers of the actual stadium. So the stock MGM stadium was used, which was modelled on Madison Square Garden.

Leonard wanted to use establishing shots of Sydney but the censors would not permit the display of any aerial shots of the city. The reason Laughton's character says he is going to Melbourne to enlist was due to available stock footage; originally the character said he was going to Sydney to enlist but the only footage of Australian soldiers marching took place in Melbourne so the line was redubbed to Melbourne to enable a cut to a scene of soldiers marching.

Laughton twisted his knee during a fight scene and had to be hospitalised.

== Reception ==
=== Critical ===
The film's depiction of Australia was criticised in the Australian press.

The Adelaide Advertiser wrote that:

Australians will find amusement to errors of detail, which apparently the Australian technical adviser in Melbourne, Lon Jones, overlooked. For instance. Sydney stadium is confused with New York's Madison Square Garden. Melbourne publishes a Sunday newspaper made up in American style, and Australians talk like Cockneys: but the film as a whole portrays Australians sympathetically to vast American audiences and also drives home the fact that the Commonwealth has actually suffered enemy violence.

James Agate wrote that Laughton plays the bulldog, pugnacious, good-hearted Australian speaking throughout with an accent more reminiscent of South Lambeth (London) than New South "Wales. His strenuous and, no doubt sincere, effort to impersonate something which is the very antithesis of his true personality is painful to behold." He said that the film story was "one of the silliest ever invented even by the scribes of Hollywood." The Sydney Morning Herald wrote that:

While it would be ungracious not to acknowledge Hollywood's intention to congratulate Australia in "The Man From Down Under", the compliment becomes hidden in a comedy of errors errors in local colour, slang, accent, dress, and character. The film is so badly off the scent In most respects that it is impossible not to be amused by it, provided that one can survive the irritations caused by its inaccuracies. But there is a more serious aspect Perhaps the producérs made no effort to make this a film of types but audiences in other countries will no doubt be ready enough to accept these 'Australians" as authentic and characteristic. Charles Laughton, uncomfortably wrestling with a variety of unfamiliar accents, represents an Australian as a gambler, a confidence trickstet, a hard drinker, and a fellow whose window-dressing of tough talk cannot conceal the fact that he is at heart a childlike and maudlin sentlmentalist. Some of these characteristics are common enough in Australia, but Laughton has carried them to laughable extremes. As no other film before it, "The Man From Down Under" cannot fail to shake Australian faith in Hollywood's ability to bring its local colour within the bounds of reasonable possibility. One becomes so preoccupied with the anachronisms and character errors of this film, that it becomes difficult to value its story objectively.

=== Box office ===
According to MGM records the film made $555,000 in North America and $515,000 overseas, making a loss of $246,000.

=== Legacy ===
The movie led to discussion about why Australia did not have its own film industry.
