= Roderic Dunkerley =

Roderic Dunkerley (July 20, 1884 – May 6, 1966) was an English Congregational minister and Christian writer. Born in Bedford Park, Ealing, West London, he was the son of novelist and hymn-writer William Arthur Dunkerley (a.k.a. John Oxenham), with whom he collaborated on the novel "The Pageant of the King's Children" (1930).

He also composed hymns, such as "Dear Father, whom we cannot see".

The novelist Elsie J. Oxenham was his sister, as was Erica Oxenham, the biographer of their father, who gives brief details of his early life within the pages of those biographies. He was married and had children.

== Books ==
- The Great Awakening (1915)
- The Arm of God (1916)
- Postman's Knock (1918)
- The Proclamation (1920)
- The Unwritten Gospel (1925)
- First Prayers (1929)
- The Pageant of the King's Children (1930) (with his father, John Oxenham)
- Treasure Trove (1948)
- The Secret Moment (1949)
- The Hope of Jesus (1953)
- At the House of the Interpreter (1956)
- Beyond the Gospels (1957)
- Prayer Time in the Junior School (1958) (with his son, Gregor Hamilton Dunkerley)

== Bibliography ==
- Oxenham, Erica (1942). J.O. Longmans, Green & Co.
- Oxenham, Erica (1946). Scrap-Book of J.O. Longmans, Green & Co.
