= O7 =

O7 may refer to:

- O7 star, a subclass of O-type stars
  - Shell star
- LNER Class O7, a class of British steam locomotives
- OzJet (IATA airline code O7), Australian airline
- o7, an emoticon for a person saluting
- O-7, a pay grade in the US uniformed services:
  - Brigadier General in the Army, Marine Corps, Air Force, and Space Force
  - Rear admiral (lower half) in the Navy, Coast Guard, Public Health Service Commissioned Corps, and NOAA Commissioned Officer Corps
- Otoyol 7, a motorway in Turkey that bypasses Istanbul.

== See also ==
- 07 (disambiguation)
- 7O (disambiguation)
- o07 (disambiguation)
