= USS Severn =

USS Severn has been the name of more than one United States Navy ship, and may refer to:

- USS Severn (1867), a sloop-of-war in commission from 1869 to 1871
- USS Severn (1898), a bark commissioned in 1900 as USS Chesapeake and renamed Severn in 1905, which served as a training ship from 1900 to 1910 and as a submarine tender from 1910 to 1916
- USS Severn (1918), a patrol boat in commission from September to November 1918.
- USS Severn (AO-61), an oiler in commission from 1944 to July 1950 and from December 1950 to 1973

== See also ==
- USS Seven
