= Winston Severn =

American cricketer and child screen actor

Winston Franklin Severn (born Los Angeles, November 30, 1942) is an American former cricketer and child screen actor.

Severn was the youngest son of Dr. Clifford Brill Severn (1890–1981). His parents had emigrated from South Africa to Los Angeles before he was born. He was the youngest of eight siblings who were all child actors: Venetia Severn, Clifford Severn, Yvonne Severn, Raymond Severn, Ernest Severn, Christopher Severn and William Severn.

Like his brothers Cliff and Raymond, Winston Severn played for the US national cricket team.

Winston Severn was a child actor who appeared in the film Her Sister's Secret.

== Selected filmography ==
- Her Sister's Secret (1946) - Billy Gordon
- Lost Honeymoon (1947) - Johnny Gray Jr.
- If Winter Comes (1947) - Hitler
- A Man Called Peter (1955) - David Weed
