= Galaxy Air =

Galaxy Air Гэлэкси Эйр
IATA	ICAO	Call sign
7O	GAL	GALAXY
- Founded: 2006
- Ceased operations: 2010
- Hubs: Manas International Airport
- Fleet size: 1
- Destinations: 3
- Headquarters: Sharjah, United Arab Emirates
- Key people: Aziz Ismailov (General Director)
- Website: http://www.galaxy.aero

Galaxy Air was an airline based in Kyrgyzstan.

The airline was on the list of air carriers banned in the European Union.

== Destinations ==
As of May 2007, Galaxy Air operated scheduled cargo flights to the following destinations:

- India
  - Delhi
- Kyrgyzstan
  - Bishkek, hub
- United Arab Emirates
  - Dubai

Due to the European Union placing all 27 airlines registered in Kyrgyzstan on the banned airline list on 12 October 2006, and those airlines still appearing on the list as of 5 March 2007, the airline has been forced to scale back its schedule.

== Fleet ==
As of May 2007, the Galaxy Air fleet included the following:

- 1 Boeing 707-320C
