= William Severn =

American actor and televangelist

- Born: William Churchill Roosevelt Severn; January 17, 1938; Los Angeles, California, U.S.
- Died: March 26, 1983 (aged 45); Ventura County, California, U.S.
- Occupation: Actor
- Relatives: Christopher Severn; Clifford Severn; Ernest Severn; Raymond Severn; Venetia Severn; Winston Severn; Yvonne Severn

William Severn (Los Angeles, 17 January 1938 – Ventura County, 26 March 1983) was an American child screen actor.

== Siblings ==
He had seven siblings who were all child actors: Venetia, Clifford, Yvonne, Raymond, Ernest, Christopher, and Winston Severn.

== Career ==
In 1957, Bill was captain of the Los Angeles Valley football team. With several of his siblings, he also worked part time in the family business, Severn Sporting Goods.

As an adult he was an evangelist, based in Ventura, California. His ministry took him and his family abroad, including to Indonesia during the 1965 revolution, Israel, and the United Kingdom. He broadcast in the United States by the Trinity Broadcasting Network. He died in 1983 from a sudden heart attack at age 45. He was buried in Pierce Brothers-Valley Oaks Memorial Park, in Westlake Village, California, beside his mother.

William Severn was known in his early films as the 'Little Billy Severn'. He made his first film appearance as Billy in Eagle Squadron, but his biggest role was as Peter Humphreys in Journey for Margaret.

== Filmography ==
Year	Title	Role	Notes
1942	Eagle Squadron	Billy	Film debut
1942	Journey for Margaret	Peter Humphreys	
1944	The Story of Dr. Wassell	Little English Boy	Uncredited
1945	Son of Lassie	Henrik	
1945	The Enchanted Forest	Jackie	
1948	The Bride Goes Wild	Piute Leader	Uncredited
1951	David and Bathsheba	Shepherd Boy	Final film, Uncredited
