= The Devil and the Deep Sea =

- Short story by Rudyard Kipling
- Country: United Kingdom
- Language: English
- Genre: Short story

Publication
- Published in: The Graphic
- Publication type: Magazine
- Publication date: Christmas 1895

"The Devil and the Deep Sea" is a short story by the British writer Rudyard Kipling, first published in 1895 in The Graphic's Christmas number. It was collected with other Kipling stories in The Day's Work (1898).

In the story, a cargo-boat involved in illicit pearl fishing is caught by the local authority in the region of present-day Indonesia; the crew eventually manage to escape, due to the expertise of the ship's engineer.

== Summary ==
The story describes the final adventure of a "nine-hundred ton, iron, schooner-rigged, screw cargo-boat", that has been used for various missions of doubtful legitimacy, in various parts of the world, with several changes of name. "Fate and her owner, who was also her captain, decreed that she should deal with embarrassed crowned heads, fleeing Presidents, financiers of over-extended ability, women to whom change of air was imperative, and the lesser law-breaking Powers." As the steam-whaler Haliotis, flying a British flag, it is noticed by a gun-boat in the region of present-day Indonesia where whalers are not found, and is pursued. The gun-boat fires a warning shot, which unintentionally damages the forward engine of the Haliotis. (The damage is described in great detail.) An officer boards the boat and finds pearls that have been poached.

The gun-boat tows the Haliotis to an island harbour. During this time, the ship's engineer Wardrop makes the after engine appear to be irreparably damaged. The Governor of the island consigns the crew to an army taking part in a local war in the interior, where they remain for several months. The Governor tries unsuccessfully to sell the boat, and he removes domestically useful items. The incident of a ship flying a British flag being fired on, becomes a diplomatic affair, and the island Governor is told by his superiors to retrieve the crew. While they are waiting to be sent to the nearest English port, he confines them to the Haliotis.

For more than two weeks, the crew, with ingenuity and hard work, reconstruct the engines, directed by Wardrop. (As with previous episodes involving the ship's engines, this is described with much technical detail.) Eventually they start the engines: they are not working well, and Wardrop says, "She moves, but — but she's breakin' my heart. The sooner we're at Pygang-Watai, the better. She's mad, and we're waking the town." The boat manages to sail slowly to a harbour of a nearby island, which is frequented by gun-boats. Here they sink the vessel, so that a gun-boat later runs into it.

== Commentary ==
The story may have been suggested by an actual situation. In the Mariner's Mirror, vol 96 no. 1, February 2010, is an article by Steve Mullins, Associate Professor of History at Central Queensland University, about Australian pearl shelling in the schooner era from the 1880s to 1914. There were diplomatic incidents between Australian pearl-shellers (fishers of mother of pearl) and the authorities of the Dutch East Indies; details such as the use of gun-boats, and a local war on an island, correspond to elements in Kipling's story.
