= List of public transport routes numbered 7 =

In public transport, Route 7 may refer to:

- Route 7 (MTA Maryland), a bus route in Baltimore, Maryland
- Barcelona Metro line 7
- Line 7, Beijing Subway
- Helsinki tram route 7
- London Buses route 7
- Line 7 (Madrid Metro)
- 7 (New York City Subway service)
- 7 Haight/Noriega, a bus route in San Francisco
- Line 7, Shanghai Metro
- Stockholm tram route 7, 'Spårväg City'
- Mexico City Metro Line 7
- Seoul Subway Line 7

== See also ==
- Line 7 (disambiguation)
