= Japanese minesweeper W-7 =

Three Japanese minesweepers have been named No.7 minesweeper (第七号掃海艇, Dai Nana Gō Sōkaitei, or "W-7"):

- Japanese minesweeper No. 7 (1928), ex-Japanese destroyer Isonami (1908), a Kamikaze-class destroyer (1905) of the Imperial Japanese Navy in World War I
- Japanese minesweeper No. 7 (1930), ex-Japanese destroyer Umikaze (1910), a Umikaze-class destroyer of the Imperial Japanese Navy in World War I
- Japanese minesweeper No. 7 (1938), lead ship of No.7-class minesweeper (1938) of the Imperial Japanese Navy in World War II

== See also ==
- Japanese auxiliary minesweeper No. 7, a No.1-class auxiliary minesweeper of the Imperial Japanese Navy in World War II
- JDS Minesweeping boat No. 7 (MSB-707), lead ship of MSB No.7-class minesweeping boat of the Japan Maritime Self-Defense Force
