= VII =

VII or vii may refer to:

== Art and entertainment ==
- Final Fantasy VII, a 1997 video game for the PlayStation
- Final Fantasy VII Remake, Final Fantasy VII Rebirth and upcoming Final Fantasy VII Revelation, a remake trilogy of Final Fantasy VII released between 2020 and 2027
- vii^{o}, leading-tone triad, see diminished triad
- VII (Blitzen Trapper album)
- VII (Just-Ice album)
- VII (Teyana Taylor album)
- VII (Tresor album)
- VII: Journal of the Marion E. Wade Center
- VII Photo Agency, an international photographic cooperative
- Saw VII, the seventh film in the Saw franchise, commonly called "VII"
- Star Wars: Episode VII – The Force Awakens, a 2015 film

== Other uses ==
- VII, the Roman numeral for seven
- Vii (river), a river in Romania
- Vehicle Infrastructure Integration, an R&D initiative for linking road vehicles to their physical surroundings
- Viscosity index improver
- IATA airport code VII: Vinh Airport, located in Vinh, Nghe An, Vietnam
- Type VII Submarine, a German submarine class in World War 2

== See also ==
- VII Corps (disambiguation)
- Vij, a surname
- Viy (disambiguation)
