= Olga Freidenberg =

Russian philosopher (1890–1955)

- Born: 15 March 1890; Odessa, Russian Empire
- Died: 6 July 1955 (aged 65); Leningrad, Russian SFSR, Soviet Union
- Parent(s): Anna Osipovna Pasternak and Mikhail Filippovich Freidenberg
- Relatives: Boris Pasternak (cousin)

Academic background
- Education: Saint Petersburg State University
- Thesis: The Origins of Greek Novel' or 'The Greek Novel as Acts and Passions

Academic work
- Discipline: Classical Philology
- Institutions: Saint Petersburg State University

Olga Freidenberg (March 15, 1890 in – July 6, 1955) was a Russian and Soviet classical philologist, one of the pioneers of cultural studies in Russia. She is also known as the cousin of the famous writer Boris Pasternak; their correspondence has been published and studied.

== Biography ==
Olga Freidenberg was born to Anna Osipovna Pasternak and Mikhail Filippovich Freidenberg in Odessa. The family moved to St Petersburg in 1903 and Freidenberg graduated from a gymnasium there in 1908. Restricted in her ability to pursue university education as a woman and a Jew, she travelled through Europe studying foreign languages on her own and living in Germany, Sweden, Italy, and Switzerland. As World War I broke out, she returned to Russia and became a military nurse.

Freidenberg returned to her studies at Petrograd University in 1923 and wrote a Ph.D. thesis in 1924, titled The Origins of the Greek Novel. The university had only started accepting women as students in 1917, and Freidenberg was the first woman to defend her thesis in classical philology. In 1935 she was awarded the Russian highest scientific degree of Doctor of Science. Since all of the Classics Departments in Russia had been shut since 1921, Freidenberg played a key role in founding the new Classical Department at Petrograd University. Freidenberg also founded the chair of classical philology and was head of the Classical Department from 1932 to 1950.

In her work, Freidenberg drew comparison between pagan erotic novels and both Acts (Apocryphal and Canonical) and Gospels. She defined a narrative genre of "acts and passions" of a hero as their common basis. Freidenberg was the first in Europe to conclude that the ‘Greek’ novel was Oriental in its origin. She noted that the archetypal patterns in the plots of its different narratives were versions of the legomenon which can be traced back to the dromenon of fertility cults.

During the Stalin era she was persecuted and her brother was arrested. In 1950, as part of the persecution of "rootless cosmopolitans", she was fired from Petrograd University. For example, Freidenberg's 1935 dissertation The Poetics of Plot and Genre: The Classical Period of Ancient Literature was the only book published in her lifetime (in 1936) but was denounced by the Soviet authorities and taken out of circulation shortly afterwards. It was republished in 1997.

Many of Freidenberg's works were not published in her lifetime and some are still unpublished. Modern scholars, such as Nina Perlina and Nina Braginskaya, are now publishing new editions of Freidenberg's works in English. Freidenberg's work is now being reviewed and reassessed, particularly in examinations of early Greek thought.

== Works ==
- The Poetics of Plot and Genre: The Classical Period of Ancient Literature
- Image and Concept: Mythopoetic Roots of Literature
- Poėtika si︠u︡zheta i zhanra
- Mif i literatura drevnosti
