= Line 7 =

Line 7 or 7 Line may refer to:

== Transportation ==
=== Asia ===
==== China ====
- Line 7 (Beijing Subway), a subway line in Beijing
- Line 7 (Changchun Rail Transit), a metro line in Changchun, Jilin
- Line 7 (Chengdu Metro), a metro line in Chengdu, Sichuan
- Line 7 (Guangzhou Metro), a metro line in Guangzhou, Guangdong
- Line 7 (Hangzhou Metro), a metro line in Hangzhou, Zhejiang
- Line 7 (Hefei Metro), a metro line in Hefei, Anhui
- Line 7 (Nanjing Metro), a metro line in Nanjing, Jiangsu
- Line 7 (Ningbo Rail Transit), a metro line in Ningbo, Zhejiang
- Line 7 (Shanghai Metro), a metro line in Shanghai
- Line 7 (Shenzhen Metro), a metro line in Shenzhen, Guangdong
- Line 7 (Suzhou Metro), a planned lateral line of the branch of Line 4 in Suzhou, Jiangsu
- Line 7 (Wuhan Metro), a line connecting Huangpi to Jiangxia, Wuhan, Hubei

==== India ====
- Red Line (Mumbai Metro), a metro line

==== Japan ====
- Line 7 (Osaka), the Nagahori Tsurumi-ryokuchi Line

==== Malaysia ====
- KLIA Transit, called Line 7 at route map

==== Philippines ====
- MRT Line 7 (Metro Manila)

==== South Korea ====
- Seoul Subway Line 7, a part of the Seoul Metropolitan Subway

==== Taiwan ====
- Line 7, Taipei Metro, the Wanda–Zhonghe–Shulin line

=== Europe ===
==== Hungary ====
- Line 7 (BHÉV), a rapid transit line in Budapest

==== France ====
- Île-de-France tramway Line 7, a part of the modern tram network of the Île-de-France region of France
- Paris Metro Line 7, one of 16 metro lines in Paris, France

==== Italy ====
- Line 7 (Naples metro), rapid transit railway line that forms part of the Metropolitana di Napoli

==== Russia ====
- Line 7 (Moscow Metro), a metro line of the Moscow Metro, Moscow, Russia

==== Spain ====
- Barcelona Metro line 7, metro-like commuter train line in the Barcelona Metro
- Line 7 (Madrid Metro), one of the 13 metro lines of the Madrid metro
- Rodalies Barcelona line 7, commuter rail in Barcelona metropolitan area, Catalonia, Spain

=== North America ===
==== Canada ====
- Line 7 Eglinton East, a proposed LRT line in the Scarborough district of Toronto.

==== Mexico ====
- Mexico City Metro Line 7, a rapid transit line in Mexico City
- Mexico City Metrobús Line 7, a bus rapid transit line in Mexico City

==== United States ====
- Route 7 (MTA Maryland), a bus route
- No. 7 Line (Baltimore streetcar), a former streetcar line to Govanstown
- 7 (New York City Subway service) Flushing Local/Express, two rapid transit services that run with each other
  - 7 Subway Extension, an extension of the above service
- 7 (Los Angeles Railway), a former streetcar line in Los Angeles

=== South America ===
==== Chile ====
- Santiago Metro Line 7, a line that is in planning

==== Brazil ====
- Line 7 (CPTM), a commuter rail line in São Paulo

=== Oceania ===
==== Australia ====
- T7 Olympic Park Line, Sydney Trains service

== See also ==
- The 7 Line Army, a group of fans of the New York Mets baseball team
- 7 Train (disambiguation)
- List of public transport routes numbered 7
