= Ernest Severn =

American actor

- Born: Ernest Hubbard Smuts Severn; May 3, 1933; Johannesburg, South Africa
- Died: November 27, 1987 (aged 54); Thousand Oaks, California, U.S.
- Occupation: Actor
- Relatives: Christopher Severn; Clifford Severn; Raymond Severn; William Severn; Winston Severn; Yvonne Severn

Ernest Severn (3 May 1933 – 27 November 1987) was an American child screen actor.

He was born Ernest Hubbard Smuts Severn, son of Dr. Clifford Brill Severn (1890–1981) and his South African wife Rachel Malherbe (1897–1984). His parents emigrated from South Africa to Los Angeles after he was born. He had seven siblings who were all child actors: Venetia Severn, Clifford Severn, Yvonne Severn, Raymond Severn, Christopher Severn, William Severn and Winston Severn.

Ernest Severn and his brothers Raymond and Christopher all acted in the 1943 film The Man from Down Under.

== Selected filmography ==
- The Man from Down Under (1943) - Tough boy
- A Guy Named Joe (1943) - Davey, English boy
- The Hour Before the Dawn (1944) - Willie
- Pursued (1947) - Young Jeb

== Bibliography ==
- John Holmstrom, The Moving Picture Boy: An International Encyclopaedia from 1895 to 1995, Norwich, Michael Russell, 1996, pp. 187–188.
