= Raymond Severn =

American cricketer and child screen actor (1930–1994)

Raymond Chesterton Shaw Severn (June 19, 1930 – November 3, 1994) was an American cricketer and child screen actor.

He had seven siblings who were all child actors: Venetia Severn, Clifford Severn, Yvonne Severn, Ernest Severn, Christopher Severn, William Severn and Winston Severn.

Like his brothers Cliff and Winston, Raymond Severn played for the U.S. national cricket team.

Raymond Severn played Paul Muni's son in the 1939 film We Are Not Alone. Raymond and his brothers Ernest and Christopher all acted in the 1943 film The Man from Down Under.

He died in Granada Hills in 1994.

== Selected filmography ==
- The Story of Dr. Jenner (Short) (1939) - Little Jim Phipps
- We Are Not Alone (1939) - Gerald Newcome
- Foreign Correspondent (1940) - bit part
- The Reluctant Dragon (1941) - Baby Weems (voice only)
- On the Sunny Side (1942) - Boots, Kids Club member
- This Above All (1942) - Jackie Harvey
- A Yank at Eton (1942) - 'Inky' Weeld
- The Man from Down Under (1943) - 'Nipper' at age 12
- A Guy Named Joe (1943) - Cyril, English boy
- The Lodger (1944) - boy
- The Hour Before the Dawn (1944) - Jim as a boy
- The Suspect (1944) - Merridew
