= Cliff Severn =

American cricketer and child screen actor (1925–2014)

Clifford Severn (September 21, 1925 – June 4, 2014) was an American cricketer and child screen actor.

Clifford Severn was the son of Dr. Clifford Brill Severn (1890–1981). His parents emigrated from South Africa to Los Angeles after he was born. He had seven siblings who were all child actors: Venetia Severn, Yvonne Severn, Raymond Severn, Ernest Severn, Christopher Severn, William Severn and Winston Severn. He died in Los Angeles in 2014 at age 88.

Like his brothers Winston and Raymond, Clifford Severn played for the US national cricket team.

As Clifford Severn (in 1940 films as Clifford Severn Jr), he appeared notably in the films A Christmas Carol and the war film They Live in Fear.

== Filmography ==
Year	Title	Role	Notes
1935	Jalna	Wakefield Whiteoaks	Film debut
1935	The Perfect Gentleman	Johnny	Uncredited
1937	Quality Street	Arthur	Uncredited
1937	The Prince and the Pauper	Third Urchin	Uncredited
1937	Our Gang Follies of 1938	Waiter	Short, Uncredited
1938	Kidnapped	Urchin	Uncredited
1938	A Christmas Carol	Boy Buying Scrooge's Christmas Turkey	Uncredited
1939	Man About Town	English Bellboy	Uncredited
1940	Gaucho Serenade	Ronnie Willoughby	
1940	Captain Caution	Travers	
1941	Man Hunt	Cockney Boy	Uncredited
1941	How Green Was My Valley	Mervyn Phillips	Uncredited
1942	Son of Fury: The Story of Benjamin Blake	Paddy	
1942	This Above All	Lift Boy	
1942	Atlantic Convoy	Sandy Brown	
1942	Random Harvest	Albert	Uncredited
1943	Forever and a Day	Nelson Trimble	
1944	They Live in Fear	Paul Graffen	Final film
