= Julián Padrón =

Julián Padrón (8 September 1910 – 2 August 1954) was a Venezuelan writer, journalist and lawyer.

== Biography ==
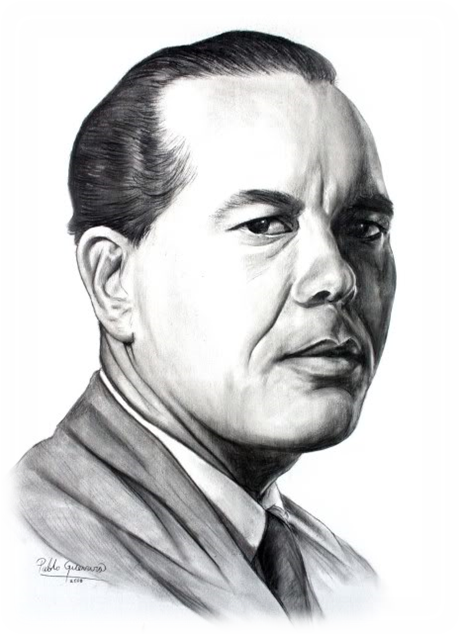
Julián Padrón

Padrón was born in San Antonio de Maturín, Monagas state, on 8 September 1910. He attended some private primary schools in Cumaná, Sucre state. Later Padrón studied secondary education at Andrés Bello secondary school in Caracas. He got his degree of secondary education in the area of Philosophy in 1929.

In 1935, Padrón received two degrees: Lawyer of the Republic and Doctor in Political Science. The first degree was obtained by him before the Supreme Court of the former Federal District, the second was achieved by Padrón at the Central University of Venezuela. At the same university he got his degree as a graduate in Diplomatic and Consular Careers in 1944.

Julián Padrón began to write for the Venezuelan magazine Elite in 1929. After that he founded and managed the literary magazine El Ingenioso Hidalgo together with Arturo Uslar Pietri, Pedro Sotillo and Bruno Plá. That magazine, created in 1935, did not last much time.

In the field of journalism Padrón worked as founder and writer of the newspaper Unidad Nacional at the beginning of 1936. Besides he was a collaborator of the Venezuelan newspaper El Universal from 1945 to 1947, and he collaborated with other Venezuelan newspapers and magazines.

Julián Padrón held these positions:

- President of the Association of Venezuelan Writers in 1937 and in 1940.
- Director-Founder of the Literary Magazines Published by the Association of Venezuelan Writers
- Director of Literary Commission of the Athenaeum of Caracas in 1940.
- Director of the magazine Shell from 1952 to 1954.

Julián Padrón died in Caracas on 2 August 1954.

== Literary works ==
Julián Padrón is the author of the following writings:

Novels

- La Guaricha (1934)
- Madrugada (1939)
- Clamor Campesino (1945)
- Primavera Nocturna (1950)
- Este Mundo Desolado (1954)

Short Story

- Candelas de verano (1937)

Dramatical Comedy

- Fogata (1938)

Short Comic Play

- Parásitas Negras (1939)

Besides Padrón wrote a Antología del Cuento Moderno Venezolano, with Arturo Uslar Pietri, in 1940 and an anthology called Cuentistas Modernos in 1945.

== Sources ==
The following book contains a short biography about Julián Padrón:

- Padrón, Julián (1984): La Guaricha. Ediciones Amon C.A., Caracas. (Biblioteca de Temas y Autores Monaguenses; Colección Guácharo; Reediciones y Biografías).
