= The Amazing Mrs. Holliday =

1943 film by Jean Renoir, Bruce Manning

- Theatrical release poster
- Directed by: Bruce Manning
- Written by: Boris Ingster (adaptation); Leo Townsend (adaptation)
- Screenplay by: Frank Ryan; Hans Jacoby
- Story by: Sonya Levien
- Produced by: Bruce Manning
- Starring: Deanna Durbin; Edmond O'Brien; Barry Fitzgerald
- Cinematography: Elwood Bredell
- Edited by: Ted J. Kent
- Music by: Hans J. Salter; Frank Skinner
- Production company: Universal Pictures
- Distributed by: Universal Pictures
- Release date: February 19, 1943 (US)
- Running time: 96 minutes
- Country: United States
- Language: English
- Box office: $1.4 million (US rentals)

The Amazing Mrs. Holliday is a 1943 American comedy drama film produced and directed by Bruce Manning and starring Deanna Durbin, Edmond O'Brien, and Barry Fitzgerald.

Based on a story by Sonya Levien, the film is about a young idealistic missionary who smuggles a group of Chinese war orphans into the United States posing as the wife of a wealthy commodore who went missing after their ship was torpedoed and sunk. After safely sequestering the orphans in the commodore's family mansion, her plans start to unravel when she falls in love with commodore's grandson and the commodore himself turns up alive and well.

Originally intended as Durbin's dramatic debut, Universal insisted on adding songs. The original director of the film was Jean Renoir, and though most of his completed footage was retained, final directorial credit was given to Bruce Manning, the film's producer.

Frank Skinner and Hans J. Salter were nominated for an Oscar for Best Scoring of a Dramatic or Comedy Picture.

== Plot ==
A young idealistic schoolteacher named Ruth Kirke is transporting a group of war orphans from South China to Calcutta when their steamship Tollare is torpedoed and sunk in the Pacific. Along with sailor Timothy Blake, they are the only passengers to survive the enemy attack. They are picked up by the steamship Westonia and taken to San Francisco, where immigration officials inform Ruth that the orphans will be held until a $500 bond ($9,300 today) is posted for each child.

With no money of their own, Ruth and Timothy go to the home of Commodore Thomas Spencer Holliday, the wealthy owner of their sunken cargo ship, who perished during the torpedo attack. When they appeal for financial assistance for the orphans, the commodore's family refuses. Desperate to help the children, Timothy tells the commodore's family that Ruth and the commodore were married aboard the Tollare before it was attacked. With the children's future at stake, Ruth reluctantly goes along with the deception.

Ruth, Timothy, and the eight orphans move into the Holliday mansion, where they soon meet the commodore's grandson, Thomas Spencer Holliday III. When a sceptical Tom questions Ruth about how she became his grandmother, Ruth explains that her Christian mission was destroyed in a Japanese bombing raid, and that she was sent south with eight European children, entrusted with their safety. Along the way, they encountered a dying Chinese woman, and Ruth agreed to care for her child as well. Moved by her personal story and her beautiful singing voice, Tom is soon smitten with the young woman.

After learning that she, as the commodore's "widow", will inherit his vast shipping fortune, and faced with pressure from the family and press, Ruth gathers the children and attempts to sneak away during the night, but Tom discovers them. Wanting to end the deception, Ruth confesses to Tom that she smuggled the orphans aboard the commodore's ship, believing it was headed to Calcutta. During the voyage, they were discovered by the commodore who promised to help Ruth get the orphans into the United States, even if it meant adopting them. After their ship was torpedoed, Ruth and Timothy put the children into a lifeboat—losing only one child, a boy named Pepe—and were later picked up by another steamship. Angered by the deception, Tom insists that Ruth stay and continue the charade until the publicity about her "marriage" dies down, after which he will care for the orphans at the mansion once she leaves.

In the coming days, as she watches Tom caring for the children, Ruth falls in love with him. When the children's immigration papers finally arrive, Ruth prepares to leave as promised, despite her feelings for Tom and the children. Later at the station, while Ruth waits for her train to Philadelphia, Tom arrives at Timothy's request, unaware that Ruth is preparing to leave. Timothy lies to Tom, telling him that the stranger sitting next to her is her fiancé—intending to make Tom jealous and prevent her from leaving. The ploy works, as Tom congratulates the stranger on his upcoming marriage. In the ensuing commotion, Tom escorts Ruth away from the train station and they return to the mansion.

Sometime later, at a China relief ball held at the mansion, Ruth sings an aria, Puccini's Vissi d'arte, to the assembled guests while Tom looks on with loving admiration. By now they have expressed their love for each other. Suddenly, the commodore steps forward, having been rescued along with Pepe following the torpedo attack. Knowing what Ruth has done for the children, he plays along with the deception, telling the guests how happy he is that fate spared his "dear wife". Afterwards the commodore tells Ruth that he will marry her for real and raise the orphans as his own children, unaware she is in love with Tom. The commodore's plans change when he learns that Ruth and Tom are in love. Addressing the guests, the commodore confesses that he and Ruth were never really married, but that in three days she is going to become Mrs. Holliday—Mrs. Tom Holliday—the wife of his grandson.

== Cast ==
- Deanna Durbin as Ruth Kirke Holliday
- Edmond O'Brien as Tom Holliday
- Barry Fitzgerald as Timothy Blake
- Arthur Treacher as Henderson
- Harry Davenport as Commodore Thomas Spencer Holliday
- Grant Mitchell as Edgar Holliday
- Frieda Inescort as Karen Holliday
- Elisabeth Risdon as Louise Holliday
- Jonathan Hale as Ferguson
- Esther Dale as Lucy
- Gus Schilling as Jeff Adams
- John F. Hamilton as Dr. Kirke
- Christopher Severn as Orphan
- Vido Rich as Orphan
- Mila Rich as Child
- Teddy Infuhr as Orphan
- Linda Bieber as Child
- Diane DuBois as Child
- Charles Trowbridge as Immigration Officer
- Irving Bacon as Ticket Agent
- Philip Ahn as Major Ching
- Ray Walker as Chauffeur (uncredited)
- Vangie Beilby as Railroad Passenger (uncredited)
- George Chandler as Butler (uncredited)
- Yvonne Severn as Child (uncredited)

== Production ==
=== Development ===
In July 1941, while Deanna Durbin was finishing It Started with Eve, Universal announced her next film would be They Lived Alone based on a story by Sonya Levien originally bought for Margaret Sullavan about a girl reporter. It would be directed by Henry Koster. She refused to make the film unless concessions were made in terms of story and cast. Universal refused and in October 1941 they suspended her contract. The situation was exacerbated by the fact her husband, Vaughan Paul, had left the studio the previous month. Durbin was earning $125,000 a film at the time. Director William Seiter and produced Bruce Manning were assigned to other films.

In late January 1942 Durbin and Universal came to terms, with the studio saying it had made some concessions.

In April 1943, Universal said They Lived Alone became Divine Young Lady. Bruce Manning would produce and Jean Renoir would direct. Leo Townsend and Boris Ingster wrote the script. It was more dramatic type of role than Durbin had previously played, with singing put to the background (she had been fighting with the studio who wanted her to make Three Smart Girls Join Up which became Hers to Hold).

Durbin later said "the sought after new Durbin image was not meant just to show me grown up but to have a story which featured me in special and different circumstances, directed by someone exceptional, instead of which I think you'll admit, as did most people, "Eve" was handed to Charles Laughton."

In May 1942, Barry Fitzgerald joined the cast.

In May, the title was changed in Forever Yours in May. Durbin's leading man was Edmond O'Brien, who contract was purchased from RKO.

=== Directorial change ===
According to a story in the Hollywood Reporter published on August 7, 1942, Jean Renoir was being replaced as director after forty-seven days of shooting. According to the story, the French director was fired because of his slow filming pace—he was reportedly ten weeks behind schedule.

According to the New York Times Renoir left the film because of recurring pain caused by an old World War I leg injury which was aggravated while shooting a battle sequence. Manning replaced him as a director.

In November 1942, a report said the film had a "seemingly endless schedule" due to replacing directors, illness to Manning and "story trouble". Durbin said "we were on the shooting stage for about six months with numerous script changes every day!"

In December 1942, the title was changed to The Amazing Mrs Holliday.

== Soundtrack ==
- "Mong Djang Nu (A Chinese Lullaby)" (Traditional, English Translation by Rosalyda Chang)
- "The Old Refrain" (Fritz Kreisler, Alice Mattullath) by Deanna Durbin
- "Mighty Lak' a Rose" (Ethelbert Nevin, Frank L. Stanton) by Deanna Durbin
- "Vissi d'arte" from Tosca (Giacomo Puccini, Giuseppe Giacosa, Luigi Illica) by Deanna Durbin
- "Rock-a-bye Baby" (Effie I. Canning, Chinese Translation by Rosalyda Chang)

== Reception ==
In his review on Allmovie, Craig Butler wrote that the film is "undeniably heartwarming and definitely has charm, even if it veers over into sentimentality." According to Butler, the film could have turned out much better had the original director, Jean Renoir, seen the project through to its conclusion.

It would have been interesting to see what Renoir might have done with the material had he seen it through from beginning to end, for his skill and delicacy might have softened some of Holliday's more awkward moments and given the final film a more consistent tone. Renoir also was quite adept at exploring the nuances that give life to individual characters and, more importantly, their relationships. As it is, Holliday hints at a greater depth that it never really plumbs.

Butler praises Barry Fitzgerald for his "fine comic relief" and Edmond O'Brien who "handles the romantic element with aplomb." Butler concludes that Durbin is in good voice and her "pleasant personality, sweet looks, and engaging way with a line build up considerable good will among viewers."

Durbin later said the film "was not good" but represents a great deal of hard work and I can't help having certain fond memories and thoughts about it... I was so enthusiastic and raring to go, the disappointment of a bad film hurt all the more and perhaps made me unfair."

== Awards and nominations ==
- 1944 Academy Award nomination for Best Music, Scoring of a Dramatic or Comedy Picture (Hans J. Salter, Frank Skinner)
