= Christopher Severn =

American former screen actor (born 1935)

Christopher Aubrey Reginald Severn (born 21 August 1935 in Los Angeles) is an American former screen actor.

Severn is the son of Dr. Clifford Brill Severn (1890-1981). His parents had emigrated from South Africa to Los Angeles shortly before he was born. He had seven siblings who were all child actors: Venetia Severn, Clifford Severn, Yvonne Severn, Raymond Severn, Ernest Severn, William Severn and Winston Severn.

Christopher Severn made his first film appearance as Mrs. Miniver's younger son Toby in Mrs. Miniver. He and his brothers Ernest and Raymond all acted in the 1943 film The Man from Down Under.

== Filmography ==
Year	Title	Role	Notes
1942	Mrs. Miniver	Toby Miniver	
1943	The Amazing Mrs. Holliday	Orphan	
1943	The Man from Down Under	'Nipper' as a child	
1943	A Guy Named Joe	Peter, English boy	Uncredited
1946	Cluny Brown	Master Ronald Snaffle	Uncredited
1946	The Strange Woman	Ephraim Poster as a child	Uncredited
1953	Titanic	Flag messenger	Uncredited
1953	Man in the Attic	Floral Delivery Boy	Uncredited, (final film role)
