= Magnificent Seven elephants =

The Magnificent Seven Elephants were seven bull elephants who lived in Kruger National Park in South Africa through the 1980s. They were so-named for the impressive 50 kg of ivory in their tusks. In 1980, park management decided to promote the seven elephants to showcase their conservation accomplishments. A series of portraits were released by Paul Bosman along with several articles from the Park's Senior Researcher, Anthony Hall-Martin. This sparked a public fascination with large elephants. When each of the seven died, their tusks and skulls were placed in a museum. After the tusks were exhibited in Olifants Rest Camp for a while, the Elephant Museum was opened in Letaba Rest Camp. Six of the elephant's tusks are exhibited there: Dzombo, Kambaku, Mafunyane, Ndlulamithi, Shawu en Shingwedzi. Those of the seventh, João, were unfortunately stolen in 1984 and never found.

== Dzombo (c.1935–1983) ==
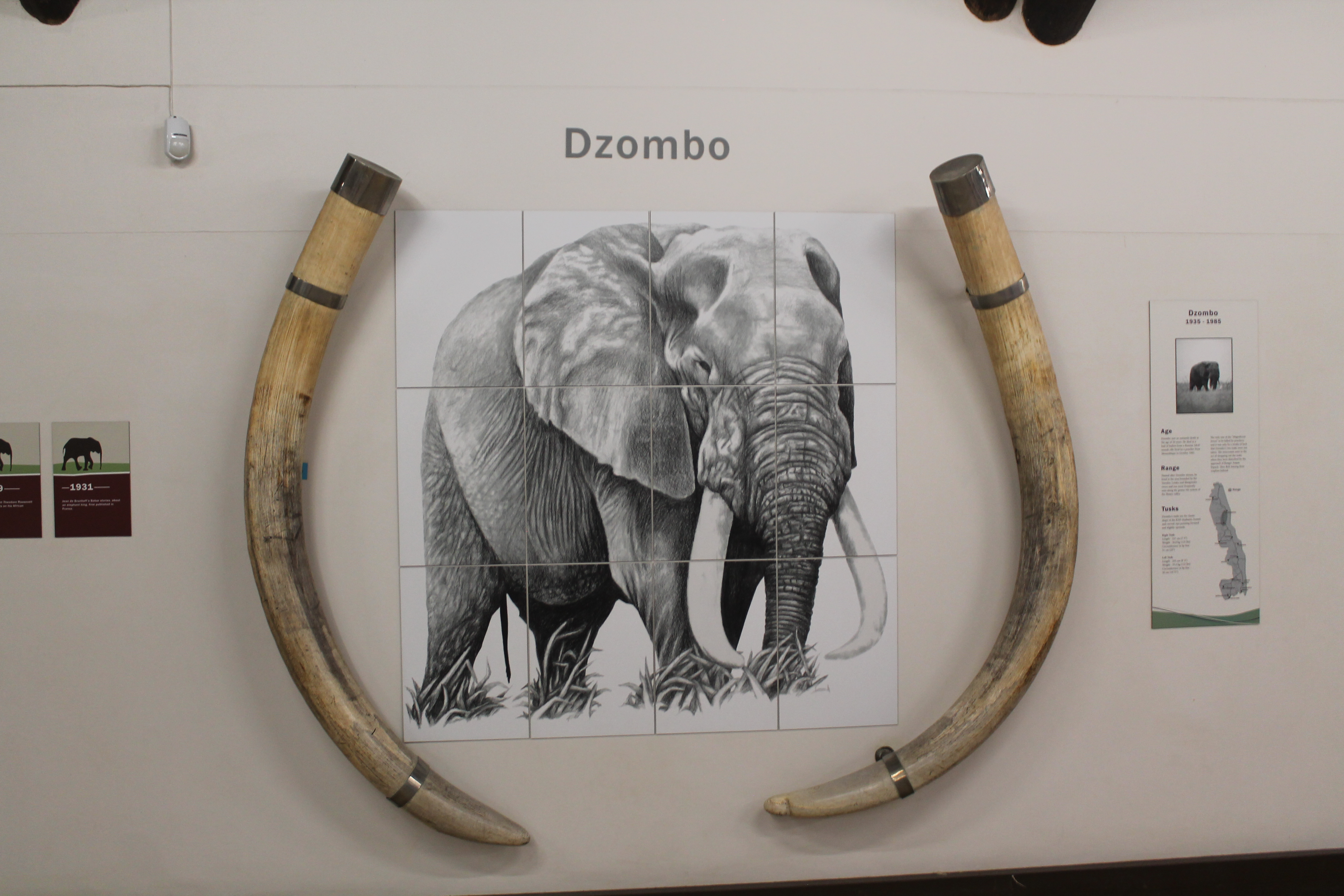
Tusks of Dzombo

Dzombo is named after Dzombo Spring in the Shingwedzi River, located in the northern area of the park. He was usually found in that section of the park, most often in the Shawu Valley between the Tsendze, Letaba, and Shingwedzi Rivers. The name Dzombo comes from the Tsonga word dzombolo which means "to wait for something approaching slowly."

Dzombo died in October 1983 at the age of 48 or 50. Killed in a hail of AK-47 bullets, Dzombo was the only one of the Magnificent Seven killed by poachers. The poachers were extracting Dzombo's tusks near the Dzombyane watering hole when the ranger Ampie Espag intercepted them, at which point they fled and left the tusks behind.

Dzombo's left tusk was 255 cm long, 50 cm in circumference at its base, and 55.8 kg in weight. His right one was 237 cm long, 51 cm in base circumference, and 56.8 kg in weight.

== João (c. 1939–c.2000) ==
João was first seen near a windmill of the same name in the Shingwedzi Basin. He was a placid elephant often found near the Shingwedzi Rest Camp. The shoulder height was 340 cm. In 1982, he was attacked by poachers but survived the AK-47 fire. His magnificent tusks were measured when he was sedated for radio banding. Unfortunately, both tusks broke 20 cm from the lip line in 1984. The cause is unknown and the resulting ivory was never found. João went missing in 2000, at the age of 61, and was never seen again. João boasted a left tusk that was 271 cm long, 51 cm in base circumference, and 55 kg in weight. His right tusk was 250 cm long, 51 cm in base circumference, and 45 kg in weight.

== Kambaku (c. 1930-1985) ==
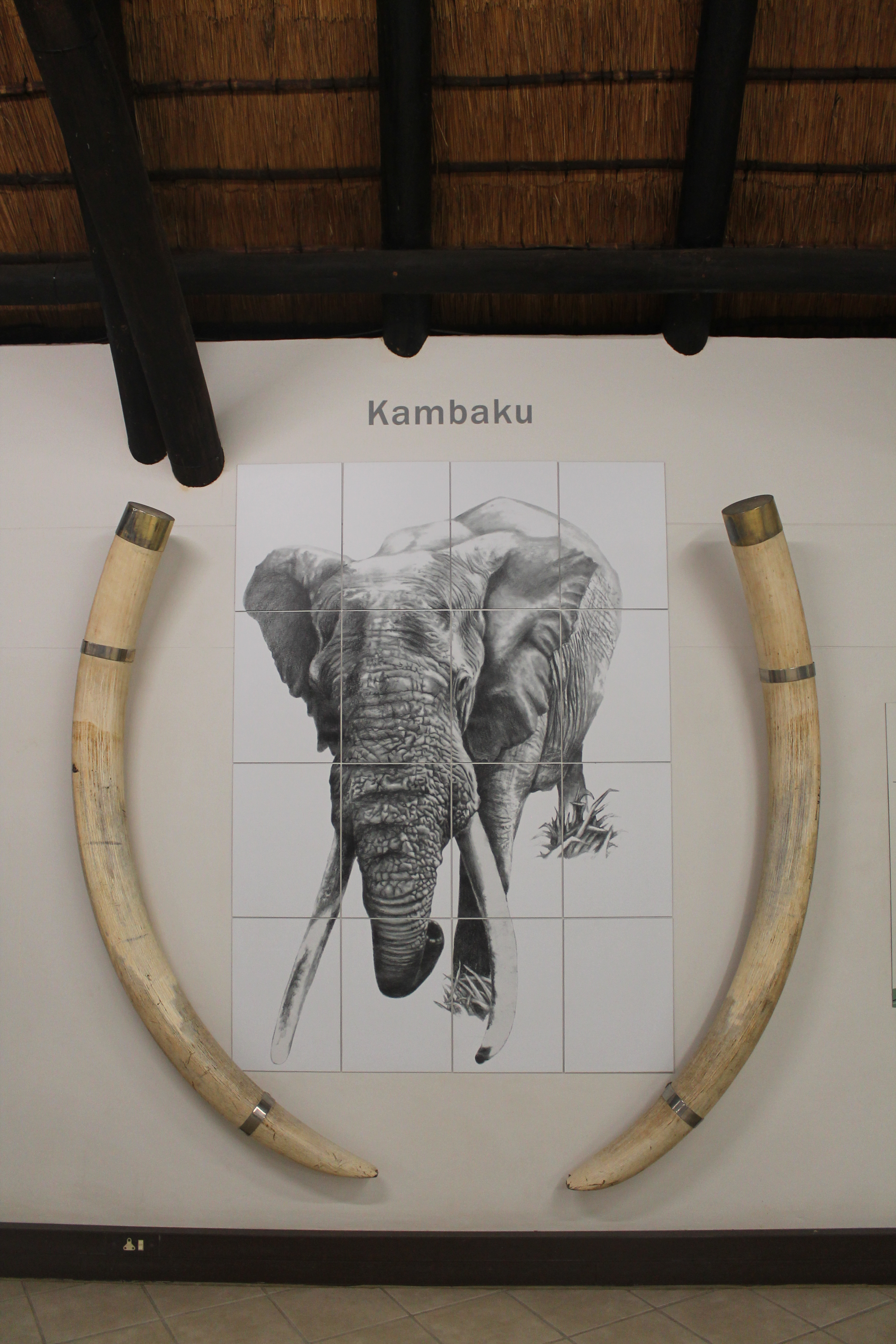
Tusks of Kambaku

Kambaku is the Tsonga word for an old bull elephant, a token of great respect for the majestic animal. Like the rest of the Magnificent Seven, Kambaku was always a loner. He was 55 years old when he was in substantial pain from a bullet wound. He was shot near the crossing of the Crocodile River when he grazed on a nearby sugarcane plantation. When he could no longer walk, he was euthanised by the ranger Lynn van Rooyen from the Lower Sabie rest camp.

Kambaku was one of the best-known bulls in the park. He crossed a large territory between the Timbavati Game Reserve and the Crocodile Bridge Rest Camp, and usually spent the wet season up north. Several visitors to the park took him down because he was easily recognizable. He had no tail hair and easily identifiable trunk marks. His tusks were precise mirror images of one another. The left tusk was 259 cm long, 51 cm in base circumference, and weight 63.2 kg in weight. The right tusk was 265 cm long, 52 cm in circumference, and 64 kg in weight.

== Mafunyane (c. 1926-1983) ==
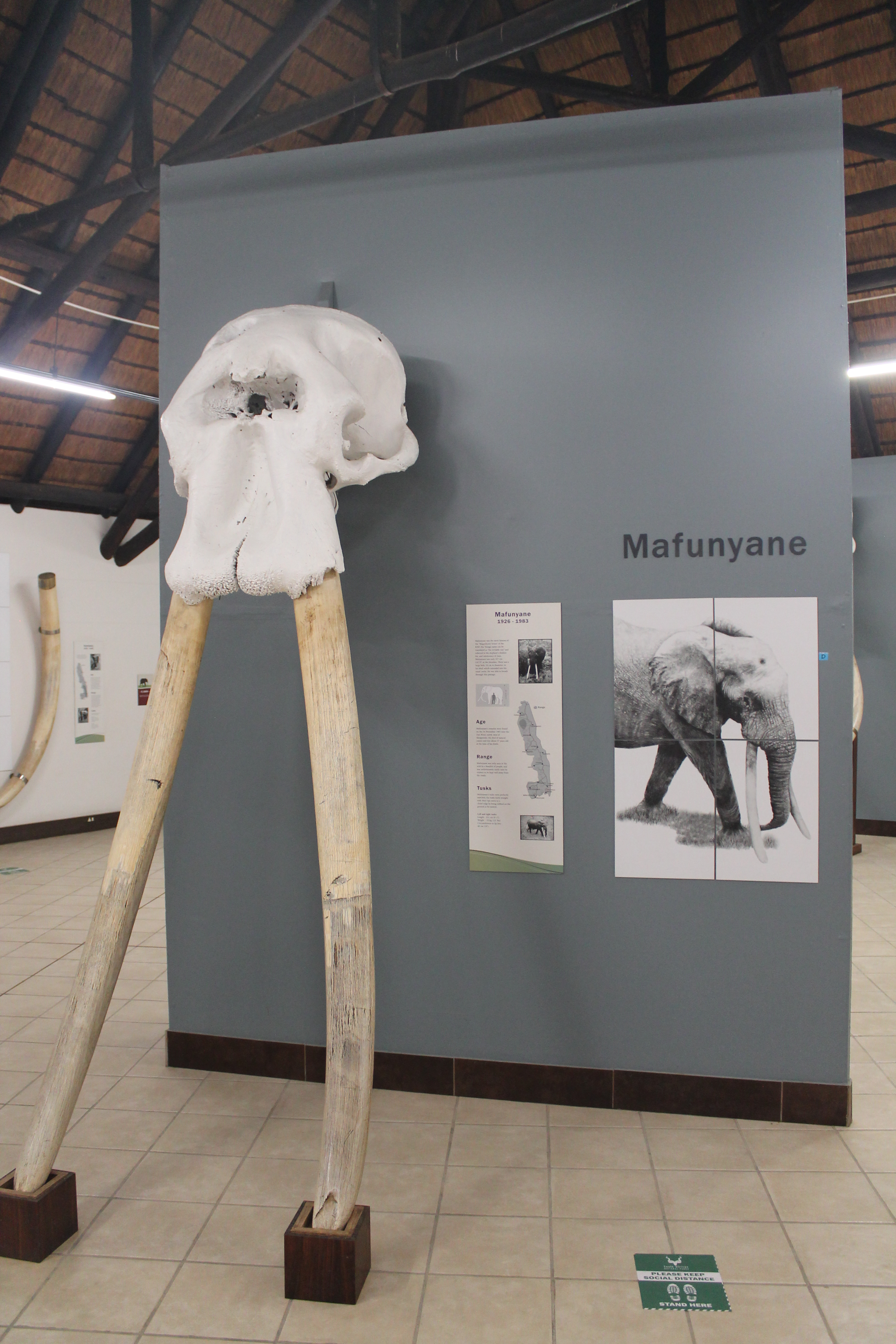
Skull and Tusks of Mafunyane

Mafunyane was the best-known member of the Magnificent Seven. His Tsonga name meant "the irritated one", based on his temper and impatience with people. He avoided the major tourist routes. Mafunyane's long, straight tusks dragged on the ground as he moved. He was a small elephant, however (only 327 cm high at the shoulder), and his tusks were shorter than most of the other Magnificent Seven's. the tusks had an oval circumference, making them look heavier than they really were. The most unique characteristic of Mafunyane was the 10-cm-wide, 40-cm-deep gap in his skull. The hole stretched into his nostril, and he could therefore breathe and consumer rainwater through it. The origin of the gash is unknown, but it is believed to have been sustained during a fight with another bull whose tusk pierced the Mafunyane's skull. Mafunyane died in 1983 of natural causes, around 57 years old. His body was found near the Tari River, northwest of Shingwedzi, around 3 or 4 weeks after his death. Both of his tusks were 251 cm long, 48 cm in base circumference, and 55.1 kg in weight.

== Ndlulamithi (c. 1927–1985) ==
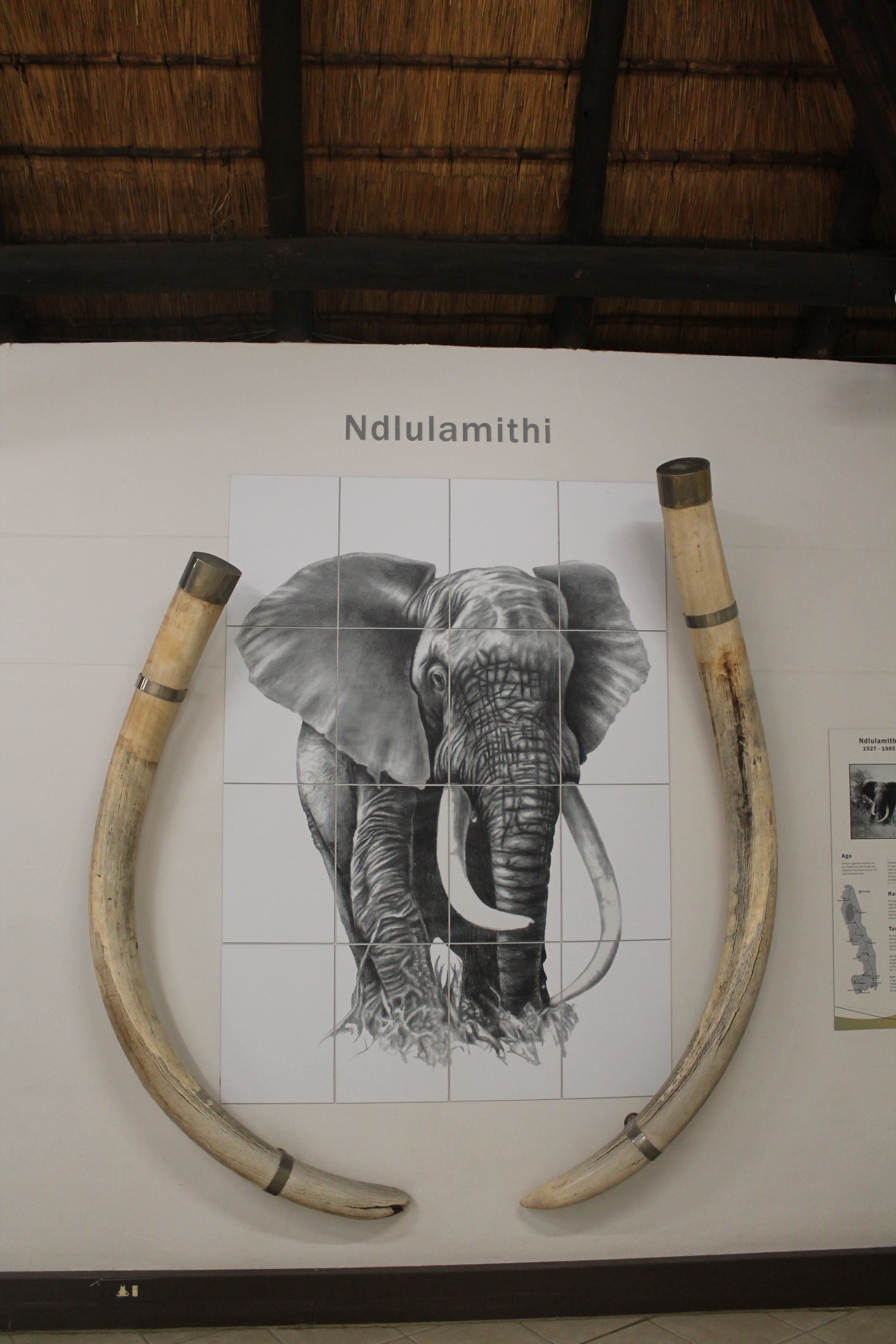
Tusks of Ndlulamithi

Ndulamithi's name is the Tsonga word for "higher than the trees." This elephant is taller than most of the other Magnificent Seven at 340–345 cm high at the shoulder. He was an aggressive, wild elephant who often charged but was seldom seen. He spent much of his time in the Shingwedzi area near the river. His right tusk shrunk shorter at one point, leaving his left tusk curving underneath the right. Ndlulamithi died of natural causes in 1985. He was found in the Shangoni Gate area by the ranger Paul Zway. His left tusk was 287 cm long, 48.5 cm in base circumference, and 64.6 kg in weight. His right tusk was 273 cm long, 48 cm in base circumference, and 57.2 kg in weight.

== Shawu (c. 1922–1982) ==
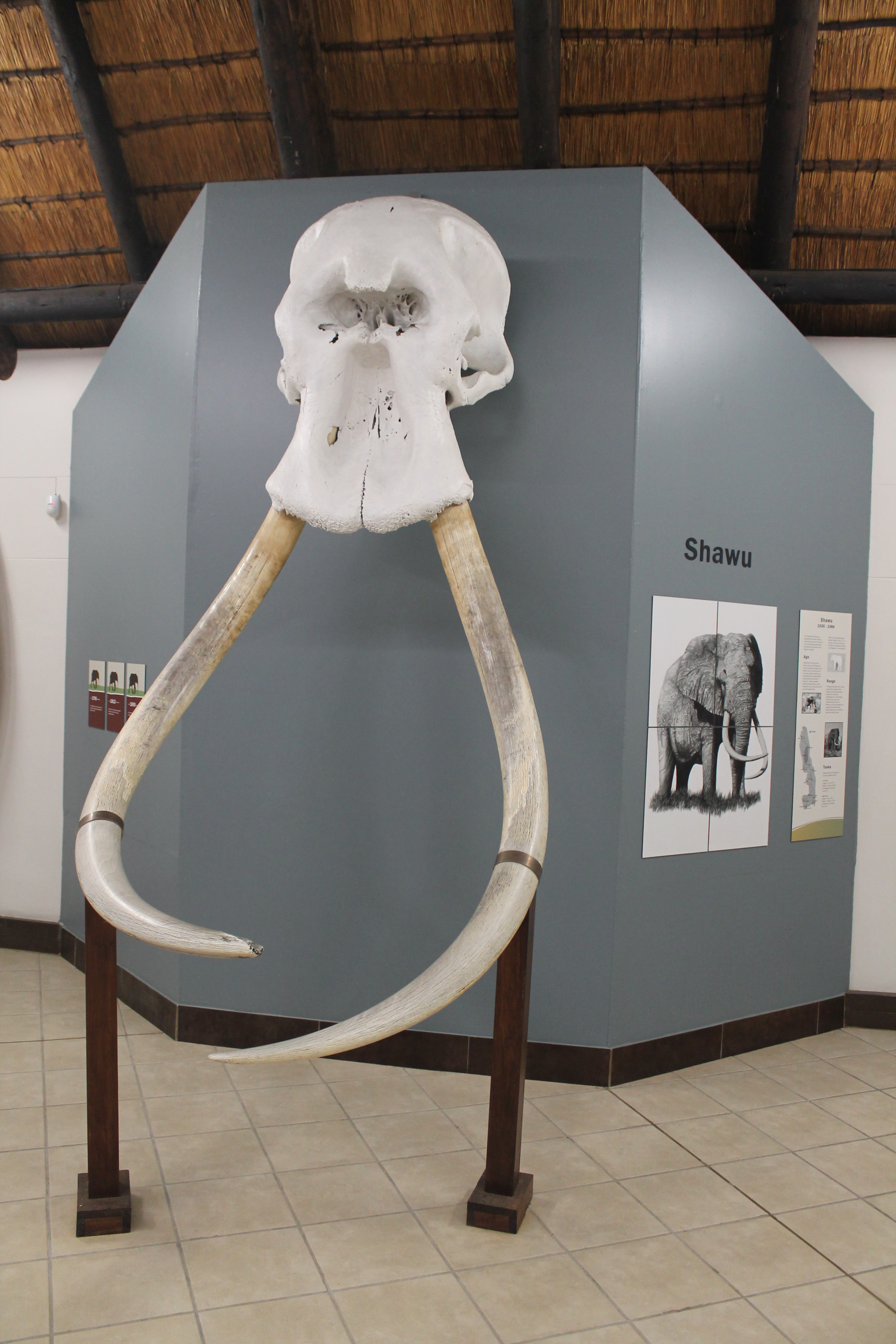
Skull of Shawu

Shawu is named for the Shawu Valley near Shingwedzi, where he spent most of his time. He often roamed as far south as the Letaba River; he was known for moving slowly and sometimes took 6 months to move from north to south. He was an agreeable bull who showed no fear of people or vehicles. With a shoulder height of 340 cm, Shawu was one of the largest of the seven. In Afrikaans, Sharu was known as "Groot Haaktand" ("Great Hook-Tusk"), in reference to his tusks' shape.

Shawu died in October 1982 of natural causes when he was around 60 years old. In his last days, his movements were monitored by radio band, and he was eventually found near the hill known as Kostinia, in the Shawu Valley. His tusks are the longest on record in South Africa. The left tusk was 317 cm long, 45 cm in base circumference, and 52.6 kg in weight. His right tusk was 305 cm long, 45 cm in base circumference, and 50.8 kg in weight.

== Shingwedzi (c. 1934-1981) ==
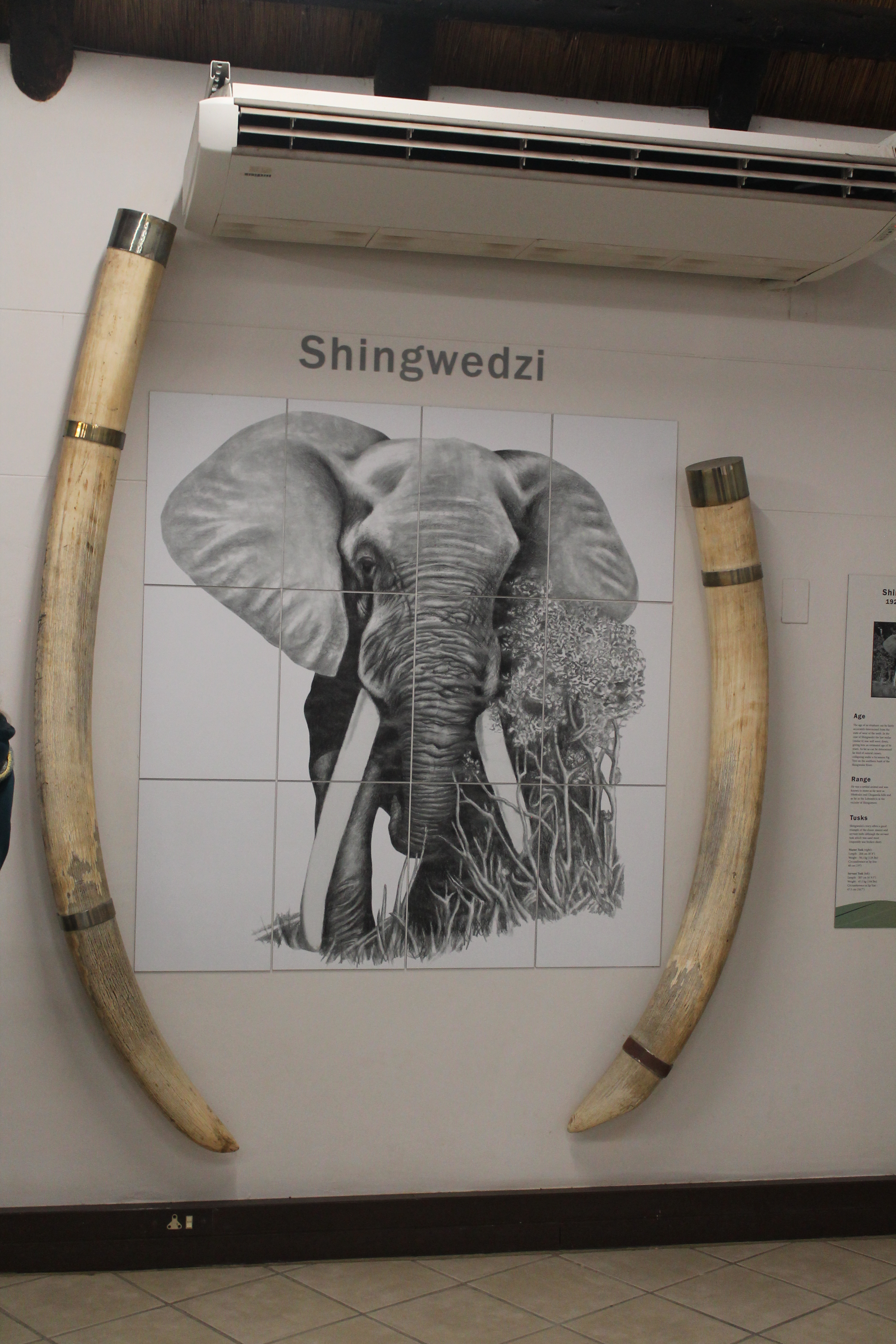
Tusks of Shingwedzi

Shingwedzi is named for the river and rest camp by which he spent the last years of his life. He was a pleasant, peaceful elephant accustomed to vehicles. He spent most of his time under the sycamores along the Shingwedzi River near the rest camp. Shingwedzi died of natural causes on 16 January 1981, when he was around 65 years old. He had collapsed under a sycamore on the southern bank of the Shingwedzi River. His main tusk was buried deep under the ground where he was found. Shingwedzi's secondary tusk wore shorter because he used it more regularly. That tusk, the left one, was 207 cm long and 47.2 kg in weight. His right tusk, the main one, was 264 cm long, 48 cm in circumference, and 58.1 kg in weight.
