= Bread upon the Waters =

- Short story by Rudyard Kipling
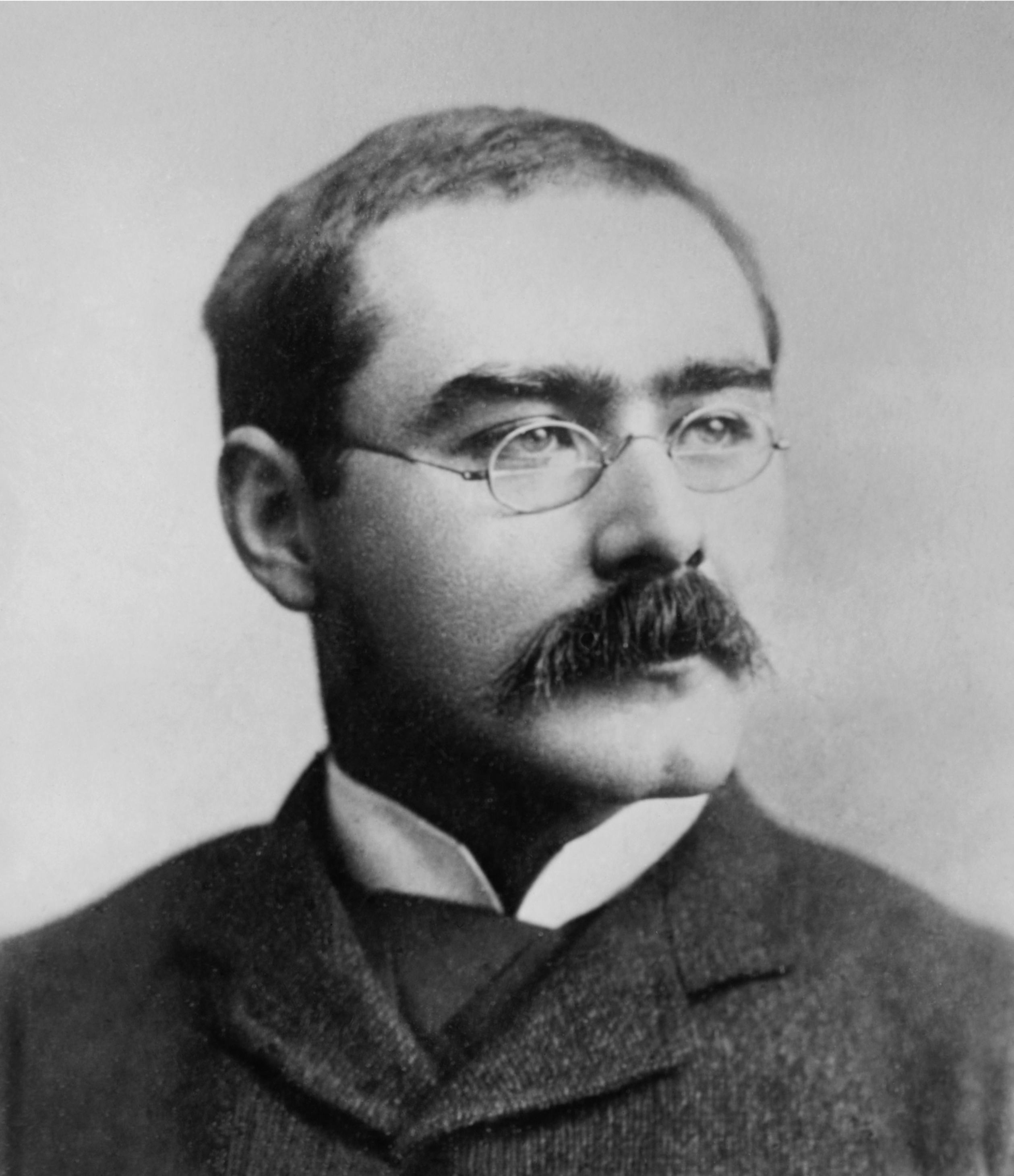
- Country: United Kingdom
- Language: English
- Genre: Short story

Publication

"Bread upon the Waters" is a short story by Rudyard Kipling, which first appeared in the London Graphic in December 1895. It was later published in The Day's Work (1898). The title derives from Ecclesiastes 11:1 - "Cast thy bread upon the waters: for thou shalt find it after many days". It was originally illustrated by Sir Frank Brangwyn.

== Plot ==
The story is narrated by Kipling as a friend of the protagonist, McPhee. Kipling had formerly known McPhee as the chief engineer of the Breslau, a vessel of the shipping firm of Holdock, Steiner and Chase. Visiting him years later, he finds McPhee has come into a great fortune, and learns his story:

In a bid to gain custom and save money, the company decided to decrease their running time across the Atlantic; McPhee, rightly seeing this as senseless risk of lives, protested and was sacked in consequence. He was then employed by the manager of a rival firm, McRimmon of McNaughton and McRimmon.

When McPhee discovered that his old firm had stopped repairing their ships, and reported to his new employer that their Grotkau, or Hoor of Babylon as he termed her, was setting to sea with a cracked propeller-shaft, McRimmon sent him out in one of his own steamers to follow the Hoor.

As expected, the ship got into difficulties, and signaled a nearby liner to rescue them. As the liner was not allowed to tow the ship, McPhee and his crew waited darkly in the background until the vessel had been cleared; then, abandoned, the Hoor was salvage at the mercy of the first comer.

McPhee towed the vessel to England, finding on the way that someone, probably disgusted at the squalid conditions aboard and preferring to abandon ship, had purposefully opened the turncocks and flooded the engine room. On McPhee's return to shore with the hulk and her valuable cargo, he and his wife received twenty-five thousand pounds sterling, and left the oceans.

McRimmon's anti-Semitism is evident in the story. He refers to the Jewish director of the old firm, Steiner, as "Judeeas Apella" and "yon conversational Hebrew", and the firm Holdock, Steiner and Chase as "that Jew-firm". The lack of maintenance of the Grotkau is attributed entirely to Steiner, the other directors being under his influence. McRimmon says, "There’s more discernment in a dog than a Jew."
