= Reception (play) =

- Written by: Maxim Gorky
- Original language: Russian
- Genre: Comedy
- Setting: A railway station five verstas away from the small town of Verkhneye Myamlino

Reception (Russian: Встреча, romanized: Vstrecha) is a one-act comedy by Maxim Gorky. It was first published in 1910, in Sovremenny Mir under its original title. Simultaneously it came out as a separate edition under the title Children (Russian: Дети, romanized: Deti), via the Berlin-based Ladyzhnikov Publishers.

Gorky mentioned it in his 20 November 1910 letter to Mykhailo Kotsiubynsky: "I send you my Reception, perhaps it will make you smile," he wrote from Capri.

== Characters ==
- Prince Svir-Mokshanski, of uncertain age, balding and frail
- Bubenhof, solid and behaves like a conqueror
- Mokey Zobnin, of around fifty, shifty, perky and prone to fantasizing
- Ivan Kichkin, old, fat and unhealthy
- Pyotr Tipunov, soft-spoken and peace-loving
- Kostya Zryakhov, a plump young man, speaks condescendingly and with unexpectedly long vowels
- Yevstigneyka, a disheveled character with eyes of a lunatic
- Tatyana Zobnina, a widow, stout and moving lazily
- Marya Viktorovna, a perky and lively girl
- Drunken passenger, Old woman with a petition, the Station master, Bykov the janitor, the Gendarme, the Telegraph man

== Synopsis ==
Two rival families of the local merchants grudgingly unite to buy a huge plot of land from a local aristocrat, with a view to build a timber factory. The reception at the railway station astounds the Prince (who arrives with a German companion). He is delighted with the way how the people here admire him and are such pure and nice creatures, 'like children'. Some other locals (including a perpetuum mobile inventor) join the party with their pleas and complaints. The celebration turns sour when it transpires that the land has just been sold, to the German man.
