= William Arthur Dunkerley =

English journalist, novelist and poet (1852–1941)

- Dunkerley, c. 1910
- Born: 12 November 1852; Manchester, Lancashire, England, UK
- Died: 23 January 1941 (aged 88); Worthing, Sussex, England
- Occupations: Journalist, novelist, poet, publisher
- Writing career
- Pen name: John Oxenham, Julian Ross
- Period: 1892 to 1931

William Arthur Dunkerley (12 November 1852 – 23 January 1941) was an English journalist, novelist and poet. He was born in Manchester, spent a short time after his marriage in the US before moving to Ealing, West London, where he served as deacon and teacher at the Ealing Congregational Church from the 1880s. In 1922 he moved to Worthing in Sussex, where he became the town's mayor.

Dunkerley wrote under his own name, and also as John Oxenham for his poetry, hymn-writing, and novels. His poetry includes Bees in Amber: A Little Book of Thoughtful Verse (1913), which became a bestseller. He also wrote the poem "Greatheart". In 1918, wrote the foreword and assessed the poetry of the administrator of the Scottish Women's Hospitals for Foreign Service, Mary H. J. Henderson In War and Peace: Songs of a Scotswoman.

Perhaps one of his best-known works in the 21st century is his hymn "In Christ there is no east or west," composed in 1908 and currently found in 336 hymnals of multiple Christian denominations, including Anglican and Catholic.

He used the pseudonym Julian Ross for journalism.

His novel A Mystery of the Underground (1897) is notable both as an early murder story about a serial killer and a very early crime story set on the London Underground (District Line). The District Railway complained that it was "too realistic", and it is said to have led to a reduction of passengers on Tuesdays (the murderer always strikes on a Tuesday) while it was being serialised.

In February 1892 Robert Barr and Dunkerley founded The Idler, a monthly "general interest magazine, one of the first to appear following the enthusiastic reception of The Strand, but not a slavish imitation". Barr and Dunkerley/Oxenham both contributed as writers. The editors were Barr and Jerome K. Jerome initially.

Dunkerley had two sons and four daughters, of whom the eldest, and eldest child, Elsie Jeanette, became well known as a children's writer, particularly through her Abbey Series of girls' school stories. Another daughter, Erica, also used the Oxenham pen-name. His son, Roderic, was an English Congregational minister and Christian writer.

== Published books and shorter works ==
- A Mystery of the Underground (1897, serialised in Today magazine)
- God's Prisoner (1898)
- A Princess of Vascovy (1899)
- Under the Iron Flail (1902)
- Barbe of Grand Bayou (1903)
- Bondman Free (1903)
- Hearts in Exile (1904)
- John of Gerisau (1904)
- A Weaver of Webs (1904)
- White Fire (1905)
- Giant Circumstance (1906)
- Profit and Loss (1906)
- The Long Road (1907)
- Carette of Sark (1907)
- In Christ There Is No East or West (1908)
- Pearl of Pearl Island (1908)
- The Song of Hyacinth (1908)
- My Lady of Shadows (1909)
- Great Heart Gillian (1909)
- A Maid of the Silver Sea (1910)
- The Coil of Carne (1911)
- The Quest of the Golden Rose (1912)
- The Gate of the Desert (1912)
- Bees in Amber (1913)
- Broken Shackles (1914)
- The King's High-Way (1916)
- All's Well (1916)
- My Lady of the Moor (1916)
- The Fiery Cross (1917)
- The Vision Splendid (1917)
- High Altars (1918) – recounts a visit to the trenches in the First World War
- Hearts Courageous (1919)
- The Wonder of Lourdes: What It Is and What It Means (1924)
- The Perilous Lovers (1924)
- The Hidden Years (1927)
- The Cedar Box (1928)
- Gentlemen - the King! (1928)
- God's Candle (1929)
- Hearts in Exile (1930)
- The Splendour of the Dawn (1930)
- The Man Who Would Save the World (1930)
- The Pageant of the King's Children (1930), with his son Roderick Dunkerley
- Cross-Roads: The Story of Four Meetings (1931)
- A Saint in the Making (1931)
- Christ and the Third Wise Man (1934)
