= The Tragedy of Pompey the Great =

1910 play by John Masefield

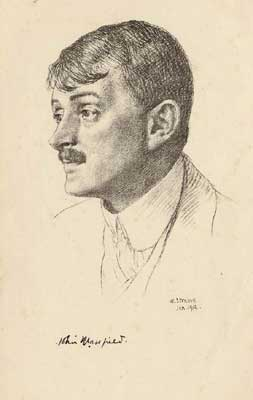
John Masefield in 1912, a drawing by William Strang

The Tragedy of Pompey the Great is a play by John Masefield, based on the later career of the Roman general and politician Pompey the Great and covering the period between 50-48 BCE, from his decision to fight Julius Caesar to his assassination in Egypt.

The play premiered at the Aldwych Theatre on 4 December 1910 and was published the same year by Sidgwick and Jackson. A revised version was published in 1914. In 1950 the play was filmed for television for the BBC Sunday Night Theatre.

== Synopsis ==
In the year 50 BCE, Pompey, the leader of the patrician party in Rome, is challenged by Julius Caesar, the popular leader, for supreme power in the state. Pompey had declared in the Senate that he had only to stamp his foot for soldiers to spring up all over Italy against Caesar who, having conquered Gaul, is advancing to the River Rubicon. Now Pompey's servants are disturbed by mocking voices of agitators in the street advising their master to stamp his foot and see what happens. His aristocratic father-in-law, Metellus Scipio, arrives to report to Pompey when he comes home that there is mutiny among the local troops. Pompey remembers the time when he sided with Sulla to save Rome from the blood-letting of a former civil war and is reluctant to plunge the city back into such chaos. Instead he plans to withdraw to Macedonia with the navy that he commands and leave Caesar to secure his rear first by dealing with hostile legions in Spain.

A year later, Pompey is camped at Dyrrachium, having gathered reinforcements. Caesar has landed and Flaccus has been sent to attack him. Though Flaccus is killed, the rest of the army resists and Caesar sues for peace. For strategic reasons, Pompey refuses, having previously decided on war to the end. Later he hears that Caesar's African army has been defeated and that Caesar is retreating from his camp. The scene then moves to Pharsalus in Greece, where Pompey's generals are increasingly insistent on provoking a decisive battle with Caesar and disposing of their enemies in Rome, rather than pursuing the waiting game that Pompey had favoured until now. Reluctantly Pompey gives the order to attack, knowing that, whatever the result, the cause of democratic government is lost.

After his defeat, Pompey is a fugitive in the final act and is moored at sea off Pelusium in Egypt. There he hopes to establish himself with the help of his ally, the boy king Ptolemey, who has many Roman veterans in his army. Most of the action is reported by the shipmen on deck. Since there are no signs of welcome, the captain and his sailors are fearful for the ship's welfare. To placate them, and trusting in the help he gave the kingdom in the past, Pompey agrees to board the small boat sent for him. When his assassination onshore is witnessed by those watching, the captain orders the anchor cable cut in haste and they sail away singing wryly of man's necessary submission to fate.

== Reception ==
Masefield chose his subject after long research into the circumstances and personalities involved in Caesar's civil war and the extinction of the Roman Republic. At the same time, the politics and conditions of his own time are reflected there too. Spotting its ambivalence of purpose, Wyndham Lewis commented on the play in the year of its publication that the author "makes Pompey a sort of Tolstoyan or neo-Christian hero".

An American critic found the play's staccato prose markedly lacking in Latinity and more the outgrowth of Masefield's own circumstances. "The sea is in Masefield's blood and in his personal experience. Who but an English poet would have ended The Tragedy of Pompey the Great with a chantey to the tune of Hanging Johnny?” The same hesitation about its effectiveness was expressed by another critic with similar scepticism. "The dialogue, intended no doubt to be taut, vigorous and sinewy, in fact jerks and spurts abruptly and unrhythmically." Only Edward Thomas, writing for the Daily Chronicle, was disposed to see more in Masefield's performance. "It is poetry. It is almost music, and on the first few pages there are notes that linger with us to the end, haunting us like the blowing of horns in an old and silent forest."

== Musical interludes ==
Both Act II.1 and 2 and Act III conclude with long-lined verse refrains reflecting on the Stoic sentiment that, however a person strives, death is the inevitable end. At the close of Act II.1, the four centurions marching off with the body of Flaccus take as the hopeful theme of their chant that, having lived nobly, "it is most grand to die". Inspired by this amid the slaughter of World War I, Ivor Gurney set the words to music as "By a bier-side" in August 1916. The same words were also set for voice and piano by Armstrong Gibbs in 1924. Responding to World War II, William G. Whittaker wrote a longer work using more of Masefield's words from the play. This was titled "The chief centurion" and added the chanty that concludes Act III to the words from Act II.1 and, as an epilogue, the three lyric quatrains that Masefield placed at the end of his book as a personal meditation on the question of human significance raised there.
