= Seven Samurai (disambiguation) =

Seven Samurai is a 1954 Japanese film.

Seven Samurai may also refer to:

- Seven Samurai 20XX, a 2004 video game based on the film
- Samurai 7, a 2004 anime series based on the film
- The Samurai Seven, an English band
- "The Seven Samurai", a song by Photek
- The "Seven Samurai", a group of optical astronomers who published numerous papers, including the proposing the existence of a Great Attractor
