= 7 Up (disambiguation) =

7 Up is a brand of lemon-lime soda.

7 Up or Seven Up may also refer to:

== Films ==
- Seven Up!, a 1964 documentary film in the Up series
- The Seven-Ups, a 1973 American crime thriller film

== Games ==
- Seven Up (game) or Heads Up Seven Up, a children's game
- Seven Up (card game) or All Fours, a card game

== Other uses ==
- 7-up (layout), a page layout strategy
- Seven Up (novel), a 2001 novel by Janet Evanovich
- Seven Up, a 1972 album by Ash Ra Tempel
- Seven Up, a candy bar formerly made by Pearson's Candy Company

== See also ==
- 7Upp, professional wrestling team
