= USS Seven =

Patrol vessel of the United States Navy

History

United States
- Name: USS Seven
- Namesake: Previous name retained
- Builder: D. R. Shackford, Norfolk, Virginia
- Completed: 1917
- Acquired: 29 June 1917
- Commissioned: 1917
- Stricken: 2 November 1918
- Fate: Ordered destroyed

General characteristics
- Type: Patrol vessel
- Length: 20 ft (6.1 m)
- Beam: 5 ft 6 in (1.68 m)
- Draft: 1 ft 8 in (0.51 m)
- Speed: 40 miles per hour

USS Seven (SP-727) was a United States Navy patrol vessel in commission from 1917 to 1918.

Seven was built for private use as a motorboat of the same name in 1917 by D. R. Shackford at Norfolk, Virginia. On 29 June 1917, the U.S. Navy acquired "Seven" directly from her builder for use as a section patrol boat during World War I. She was commissioned as USS Seven (SP-727) in 1917.

Seven spent her entire career in the Hampton Roads, Virginia, area, operating as a rescue boat for flying students until shortly before the end of World War I.

Seven eventually was deemed unsuitable for further naval use, and was stricken from the Navy List on 2 November 1918. The Navy ordered her destroyed. Disposed of by burning 12 November 1918.
