= A Maid of the Silver Sea (novel) =

1910 novel by John Oxenham

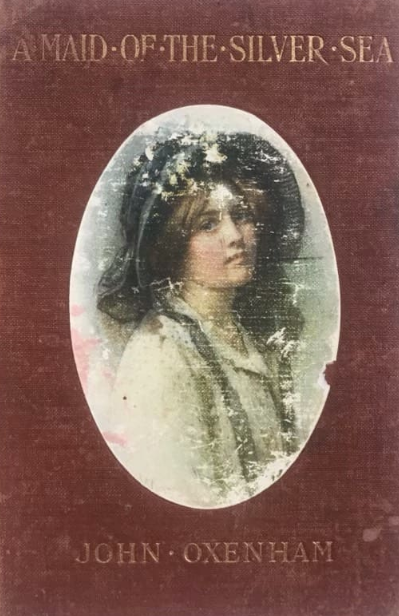
- Author: John Oxenham
- Language: English
- Genre: Drama
- Publication date: 1910
- Publication place: United Kingdom
- Media type: Print
- Pages: 192
- ISBN: 979-8869701817

A Maid of the Silver Sea is a novel by the British writer John Oxenham, which was first published in 1910.

== Film adaptation ==
In 1922 the novel was turned into a silent film A Maid of the Silver Sea directed by and starring Guy Newall alongside his wife Ivy Duke.

== Bibliography ==
- Goble, Alan. The Complete Index to Literary Sources in Film. Walter de Gruyter, 1999.
