= No. 7 (brand) =

British brand of skincare and cosmetic products

- Product type: Cosmetics
- Current owner: The Boots Group
- Country: United Kingdom
- Introduced: 1935
- Website: no7company.com

No7 is a beauty brand of anti-ageing creams, skincare and cosmetic products developed by Boots, a subsidiary of The Boots Group, in the United Kingdom. The brand No7 was launched by Boots in 1935 as a selection of eleven skincare products and was expanded in 1937 with some colour cosmetics. Since its introduction, the brand has undergone eight redesigns. In 2007, Boots expanded the range to incorporate body products, foundation, creams and men's skincare.

In 2021, Walgreens Boots Alliance (WBA), the company owning the brand, launched No7 as a separate company.

No7's products and services are available in over 20,000 stores and online, in 29 markets worldwide.
