= Channel 7 =

Channel 7 or TV7 may refer to:

== Television networks, channels and stations ==
Algeria

- TV7 (Algerian TV channel)

Argentina

- Channel 7 (Argentina), a government-owned Argentine TV station
- Channel 7 – Bahía Blanca, an Argentine TV station in Buenos Aires province
- Channel 7 – Mendoza, an Argentine TV station in Mendoza province
- Channel 7 – Santiago del Estero, an Argentine TV station in Santiago del Estero province
- Channel 7 – Neuquén, an Argentine TV station in Neuquén province
- Channel 7 – Jujuy, an Argentine TV station in Jujuy province
- Channel 7 (Rawson, Argentina)
- LU 78 Canal 7 Islas Malvinas

Australia

- Seven Network or Channel 7, an Australian television network
  - HSV (TV station), a television station in Melbourne, Australia, part of the Seven Network

Belize

- Tropical Vision Limited, a Belize news channel

Bolivia

- Bolivia TV, formerly known as Canal 7, a government-owned Bolivian TV station

Bulgaria

- TV7 (Bulgarian TV channel)

Canada

- Channel 7 TV stations in Canada
- Channel 7 virtual TV stations in Canada

Chile

- Televisión Nacional de Chile, a public television network in Chile broadcasting on Channel 7 in Santiago de Chile
- Canal 7 UCV TV, a defunct television channel in Puerto Montt, Chile

China

- CCTV-7, a Chinese television channel

Ecuador

- Ecuador TV, an Ecuadorian free-to-air television channel

Egypt

- Upper Channel, an Egyptian regional television channel

Estonia

- Duo 7, an Estonian television channel

France

- TV7 Bordeaux, a television channel in Bordeaux, France

Hungary

- TV7 (Hungarian TV channel), a Hungarian TV channel
- TV7 (Hungary), a Hungarian TV channel as Televízió Segintge

India

- IBN-7, a Hindi television news channel that became News18 India

Indonesia

- Trans7, an Indonesian television network formerly known as TV7

Israel

- Arutz Sheva, an Israeli media network

Italy

- TV7 (Italy), an Italian TV channel
- Tv7 Pathè, an Italian TV channel
- Italia 7, a defunct Italian television channel
- La7, an Italian television channel

Japan

- TV Tokyo, a Japanese television station, virtual channel 7

Kazakhstan

- Channel 7 (Kazakhstan), a Kazakhstani television channel

Kosovo

- T7 (Kosovo TV channel), a Kosovo television channel

Lithuania

- TV7 (Lithuania), a defunct Lithuanian local television channel

Malaysia

- NTV7, a Malaysian television network owned by Media Prima

Mexico

- Channel 7 TV stations in Mexico
- Channel 7 virtual TV stations in Mexico
- Azteca 7, a Mexican television channel, owned by TV Azteca
  - XHIMT-TV, commonly known as Canal 7, the flagship television station of Azteca 7 in Mexico City, Mexico

Netherlands

- Euro 7, a defunct Dutch television channel
- RTL 7, a Dutch television channel
- RTV-7, a Dutch television network with programming from the Dutch Caribbean
- Sport 7, a defunct Dutch television channel

New Zealand

- TVNZ 7, a defunct New Zealand television channel

Nigeria

- Channel 7 (formally GNTV), broadcasting to ex-pats in the UK on the Freeview Vision TV Network

Panama

- Tele 7, a Panamanian free-to-air television channel

Peru

- TV Perú, a government-owned Peruvian TV network broadcasting on Channel 7 in Lima, Peru

Philippines

- DZBB-TV, commonly known as Channel 7, the flagship television station of GMA Network in Manila, Philippines

Spain

- Canal 7 Televisión, a defunct television station in Madrid, Spain

Sweden

- TV7 (Sweden), a Swedish television channel
- Sjuan (The Seven), formerly TV4 Plus, Swedish television channel

Thailand

- Channel 7 (Thailand), a television station in Thailand

Tunisia

- Tunisie 7, a Tunisian television channel commonly known as TV7

Turkey

- Kanal 7 (Channel 7), a Turkish channel

United Kingdom

- Various local television channels.

United States

- Channel 7 branded TV stations in the United States
- Channel 7 digital TV stations in the United States
- Channel 7 low-power TV stations in the United States
- Channel 7 virtual TV stations in the United States

Uruguay

- Channel 7 (Punta del Este, Uruguay), a repeater station of Channel 10

Vietnam

- VTV7, a Vietnamese television channel
- HTV7, a Vietnamese television channel in Ho Chi Minh City

== Other uses ==
- Channel 7 (musician), the musician previously known as 7 Aurelius
- Kanaal 7/Channel 7, a Namibian radio station

== See also ==
- Circle 7 logo, logo used by various US TV stations and several international broadcasters
- Network seven (disambiguation), including 7 network
- Channel (disambiguation)
- 7 (disambiguation)
