= Strake Jesuit College Preparatory =

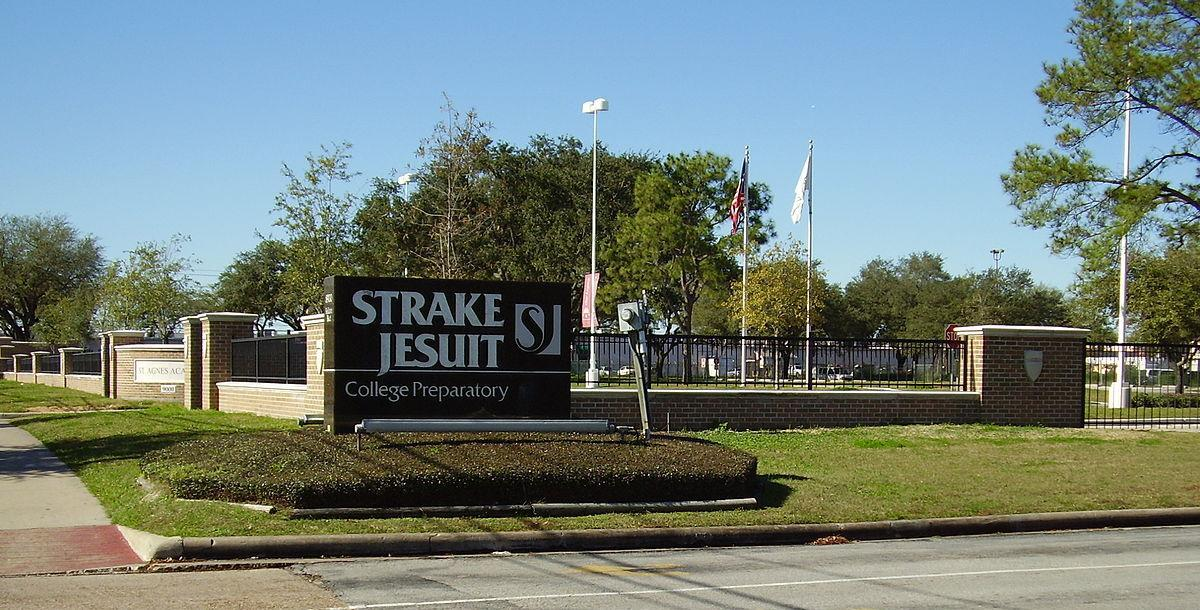

Location
- 8900 Bellaire Boulevard; Houston, Texas 77036-4699; United States; 29°42′29″N 95°32′23″W

Information
- Type: Private independent college-preparatory school
- Religious affiliations: Roman Catholic; Jesuit
- Patron saint: Stanislaus Kostka
- Established: June 21, 1960; 66 years ago
- Founder: Michael Kenelley
- President: Fr. Jeff Johnson, S.J.
- Principal: Ken Lojo
- Chaplain: Fr. Michael Wegenka, S.J.
- Teaching staff: 104.8 (FTE) (2017–18)
- Grades: 9–12
- Gender: All male
- Enrollment: 1,108 (2017–18)
- Student to teacher ratio: 9.7:1 (2017–18)
- Campus: Urban
- Colors: Green; White
- Slogan: "Magis"
- Nickname: Crusaders
- Accreditation: Southern Association of Colleges and Schools
- Publication: Inkwell (literary magazine)
- Newspaper: Magis
- Yearbook: The Crusader
- Website: www.strakejesuit.org

Carlos Setien's Untitled on Strake campus

Strake Jesuit College Preparatory (properly referred to as Strake Jesuit or Jesuit but often informally called Strake) is a Jesuit, college-preparatory school for boys, grades 9–12, in the Chinatown area and in the Greater Sharpstown district of Houston, Texas, United States. It is near Alief.

With over 1,200 students, it is the largest Catholic high school in Houston. It has a full-time curator for its art collection; the City of Houston has classified the campus as an art museum. The school is located within the Roman Catholic Archdiocese of Galveston-Houston. It is one of only two private schools in Texas that are members of the University Interscholastic League (the other being Dallas Jesuit), which allows it to compete athletically against the largest public schools.

== History ==
The school was founded by Father Michael Kenelley, S.J., on June 21, 1960, in what was then the undeveloped, west side of Houston. It is named in honor of oil tycoon George William Strake Sr.

The school's patron saint is Stanislaus Kostka, a Polish Jesuit who serves as a patron of students; additionally, as a Jesuit institution, Ignatius of Loyola is invoked as an unofficial patron saint.

In 1971, the school asked to declare Chapter 10 bankruptcy as it lost money in the Sharpstown scandal. The school surrendered 7 acres (2.8 ha) of its original property to pay its debts and emerge from bankruptcy protection. The seven-acre tract was repurchased by the school in 2012 for $3.3 million.

From 1990 to 1993, the number of applications submitted to Strake Jesuit doubled. Fr. Brian Zinnamon, the school president, said during the year that there were twice as many applicants as available spots. At the time, tuition was $4,700 per year, described by the Houston Chronicle as steep. Father Zinnamon said, "Certainly what is going on in the public schools is a factor. Parents are choosing a safe environment where they know their children are getting Christian values."

In 2005, before Hurricane Katrina, the school had 899 students. An additional 410 were temporarily enrolled at Strake after the hurricane for a period of time from Jesuit High School in New Orleans.

== Athletics ==
The "Fighting Crusaders" were one of many Catholic high schools that originally competed in the now defunct T.C.I.L. (Texas Christian Interscholastic League). The league began in 1935 under the direction of Albert Mitchell (then principal of Central Catholic, San Antonio). Strake Jesuit's last year of competition in the T.C.I.L. concluded when the league came to a close in the 1999–2000 athletic season with the baseball team capturing the final T.C.I.L. State Championship in any sport. After T.C.I.L. merged with TAPPS, both Strake Jesuit and Dallas Jesuit were not permitted to join as TAPPS believed those two schools were too powerful. From the fall of 2000 to the spring of 2003, the Crusaders competed as an independent in all sports.

They were admitted into the University Interscholastic League (U.I.L.), the public school athletic league, partly due to the efforts of Joe Nixon, a member of the Texas House of Representatives. Texas Senate Bill 1943 opened the UIL to Strake and Dallas Jesuit, which established rules to put those two schools on equal footing with public schools. After its admission into the U.I.L., Strake Jesuit began competing in its listed district of 19-5A in the fall of 2003. The Crusaders have won several district and regional championships along with a state championship, state runners-up, and state semi-finalists within the past eight years in the U.I.L. The "Fighting Crusaders" athletic department provides 14 different programs which include: baseball, basketball, cross-country, football, golf, ice hockey, lacrosse, rugby, soccer, swimming & diving, tennis, track & field, water polo, and wrestling.

The Houston Press ranked the U.I.L. realignment as the "Best Way to Break In to the Big Time" in 2003.

=== Rivalry ===
Despite moving to the U.I.L., Strake Jesuit had a storied rivalry with Saint Thomas High School (STH). Since its beginning in 1964, Strake Jesuit had a record of 24–29–1 against STH. However, as of 2020, both schools have announced the end of the annual competition and Strake Jesuit will now compete with Dallas Jesuit instead. This decision however was disliked by students and alumni from both schools.

== Notable alumni ==
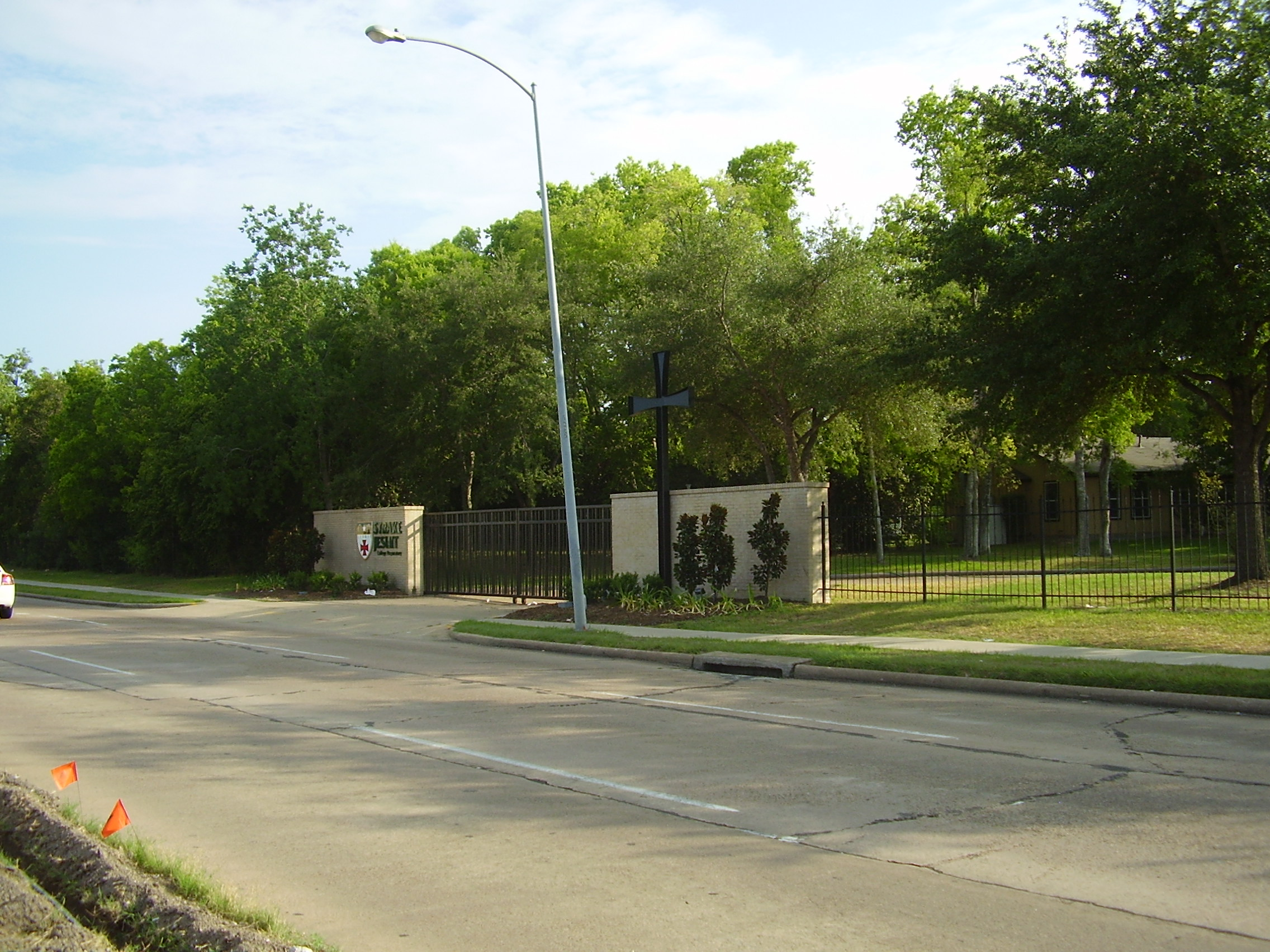
Entrance to Strake Jesuit

- Gerald Hills (1973) – politician and educator; former chair of the Michigan Republican Party
- Jim Murphy (1976) – Member of Texas House of Representatives
- Rod Graves (1977) – former General Manager of the Arizona Cardinals
- Tom Gruber (1977) – American computer scientist, inventor, and entrepreneur who co-founded Siri Inc.
- Eric Mullins (1980) – Co-CEO of Lime Rock Resources and former NFL player
- Fred Viancos (1980) – former professional tennis player and chief operating officer of United States Professional Tennis Association
- Garth Jax (1982) – former NFL linebacker
- Bill Nguyen (1991) - Technology entrepreneur, founder of Onebox.com, SEVEN Networks, La La Media Inc., and Color labs
- Chris Darkins (1992) – former NFL running back
- Jake Voskuhl (1996) – former NBA player
- Nelson Akwari (2000) – former professional soccer player
- Derek Lyons (2000) – Counselor to the President Donald Trump
- Chris Ogbonnaya (2004) – former NFL running back
- Greg Casar (2007) – US Rep TX-35, former Member of the Austin City Council
- Nicolas Jean-Baptiste (2007) – former NFL nose tackle
- Austin Claunch (2008) – college basketball coach, head coach of Nicholls State Colonels
- David King (2008) – former NFL defensive end
- Tim Frazier (2009) – NBA player
- Juan Adams (2010) – professional mixed martial artist
- Pace Murphy (2012) – former NFL offensive tackle
- Rasheed Sulaimon (2012) - professional basketball player
- Ilolo Izu (2015) – track and field athlete specializing in sprints and hurdles
- Matthew Boling (2019) – track and field athlete specializing in sprints and long jump
- Michael Wiley (2019) – college football running back for the Arizona Wildcats

== See also ==
- Christianity in Houston
- List of Jesuit sites
