= Network seven =

Network seven or variants may refer to:

- Seven Network, an Australian television broadcast network
- SEVEN Networks, an American networking, mobility, software company
- Network 7, or Network Seven, a 1980s British youth TV programme
- Seven (UK TV channel), later Estuary TV, independent local British TV station

== See also ==
- Channel 7 (disambiguation)
- 7 (disambiguation)
- Seven Regional (disambiguation)
- .NET 7 Microsoft programming framework
