= Channel 7 low-power TV stations in the United States =

The following low-power television stations broadcast on digital or analog channel 7 in the United States:

- K07AQ in Kamiah, Idaho
- K07BW-D in Westcliffe, Colorado
- K07CG-D in Toquerville, Utah
- K07CH-D in Plains & Paradise, Montana
- K07DI-D in Hinsdale, Montana
- K07DU-D in Ely & McGill, Nevada
- K07DV-D in Ruth, Nevada
- K07ED-D in Enterprise, Utah
- K07EJ-D in Townsend, Montana
- K07EN-D in Woods Bay/Lakeside, Montana
- K07EQ-D in Ekalaka, Montana
- K07FL-D in Thompson Falls, Montana
- K07GI-D in Prospect, Oregon
- K07GJ-D in Hoopa, California
- K07GQ-D in Cedar City, Utah
- K07HM-D in Big Piney, etc., Wyoming
- K07HS-D in Williams, Oregon
- K07IB-D in Whitewater, Montana
- K07IC-D in Malta, Montana
- K07IT-D in West Glacier, etc., Montana
- K07JG-D in Glasgow, Montana
- K07JO-D in Chelan Butte, Washington
- K07JS-D in North Bend, Oregon
- K07JT-D in Brookings, Oregon
- K07KF-D in Thomasville, Colorado
- K07NL-D in Juliaetta, Idaho
- K07NR-D in Lakeview, etc., Oregon
- K07NU-D in White Sulphur Springs, Montana
- K07OC-D in Polaris, Montana
- K07OJ-D in Snowflake, Arizona
- K07OL-D in Kipnuk, Alaska
- K07PA-D in Manitou Springs, Colorado
- K07PB-D in Thayne, etc., Wyoming
- K07PF-D in Homer, Alaska
- K07PZ-D in Cave Junction, Oregon
- K07QC-D in Driggs, Idaho
- K07QD-D in Hooper Bay, Alaska
- K07QX-D in Golovin, Alaska
- K07RB-D in Tanana, Alaska
- K07RD-D in Savoonga, Alaska
- K07RJ-D in Holy Cross, Alaska
- K07RK-D in St. Marys, Alaska
- K07RU-D in Dot Lake, Alaska
- K07RY-D in Chignik, Alaska
- K07SS-D in Angoon, Alaska
- K07ST-D in Women's Bay, Alaska
- K07TH-D in Lime Village, Alaska
- K07TK-D in Marshall, Alaska
- K07UY-D in Cortez, Colorado
- K07VA-D in Jordan, Montana
- K07VY-D in The Dalles, Oregon
- K07WJ-D in Colstrip, Montana
- K07WP-D in Roundup, Montana
- K07XL-D in Mountain Home, Arkansas
- K07XM-D in Mink Creek, Idaho
- K07YJ-D in Bullhead City, Arizona
- K07YV-D in The Dalles, Oregon
- K07ZE-D in Rural Juab, etc., Utah
- K07ZG-D in Powderhorn Valley, Colorado
- K07ZL-D in Leavenworth, Washington
- K07ZP-D in Bull Lake Valley, Montana
- K07ZQ-D in Georgetown, Idaho
- K07ZR-DT in Harlowton & Shawmut, Montana
- K07ZT-D in Long Valley Junction, Utah
- K07ZU-D in Blanding, Monticello, Utah
- K07ZV-D in Sigurd & Salina, Utah
- K07ZW-D in Marysvale, Utah
- K07ZX-D in Woodland & Kamas, Utah
- K07ZY-D in Beaver, etc., Utah
- K07ZZ-D in East Price, Utah
- K07AAA-D in Helper, Utah
- K07AAB-D in Roosevelt, etc., Utah
- K07AAD-D in Fort Worth, Texas
- K07AAF-D in Corsicana, Texas
- K07AAI-D in Reno, Nevada
- K07AAL-D in Orogrande, New Mexico
- K07AAN-D in Santa Maria, California
- K11WZ-D in Delta Junction, etc., Alaska
- K15KB-D in Squaw Valley, Oregon
- K15KE-D in Klamath Falls, etc., Oregon
- KBNZ-LD in Bend, Oregon
- KDHU-LD in Houston, Texas
- KHXL-LD in Huntsville, Texas
- KJJC-LD in Helena, Montana
- KJUN-CD in Morgan City, Louisiana
- KMNF-LD in St. James, Minnesota
- KOTR-LD in Monterey, California
- KPPI-LD in Garapan/Saipan, Northern Marianas
- KZTC-LD in San Diego, California
- W07BP-D in Ocala, Florida
- W07DC-D in Allentown/Bethlehem, Pennsylvania
- W07DD-D in Champaign, Illinois
- W07DS-D in Burnsville, North Carolina
- W07DT-D in Tryon & Columbus, North Carolina
- WCDN-LD in Cleveland, Ohio
- WCHU-LD in Oakwood Hills, Illinois
- WFVX-LD in Bangor, Maine
- WHFL-CD in Goldsboro, North Carolina
- WKIN-CD in Weber County, Virginia/Kingsport, Tennessee

The following low-power stations, which are no longer licensed, formerly broadcast on analog or digital channel 7:

- K07AG in Aguilar, Colorado
- K07CY in Vernal, etc., Utah
- K07GY in Beaver, etc., Utah
- K07HK in Hoehne, Colorado
- K07KT in Canyonville, etc., Oregon
- K07ND in Healy, Alaska
- K07BK in Grace, etc., Idaho
- K07CM in Panaca, Nevada
- K07DG in Omak, etc., Washington
- K07GD-D in Glenwood Springs, Colorado
- K07IA-D in Oakland, Oregon
- K07IL in Winston, Oregon
- K07IP in Big Sandy, Montana
- K07IX in Happy Camp, California
- K07IZ in Fish Lake Resort, Utah
- K07JC in Indian Springs, Nevada
- K07JZ in Escalante, Utah
- K07KD in Checkerboard, etc., Montana
- K07LO in Forsyth, Montana
- K07NH in Ridgecrest, etc., California
- K07NI in Jeffrey City, Wyoming
- K07NS in Helper, Utah
- K07NV in Hanna, etc., Utah
- K07OP in Emmonak, Alaska
- K07OQ in East Price, Utah
- K07OV in Green River, Utah
- K07PG-D in Seward, Alaska
- K07PH in Le Chee, etc., Arizona
- K07PX in Rockville, Utah
- K07QK in Rosebud, etc., Montana
- K07QM in Bridgeport, etc., California
- K07QS in Glennallen, Alaska
- K07QU-D in Shaktoolik, Alaska
- K07QV-D in Hoonah, Alaska
- K07QW in Koliganek, Alaska
- K07QY in Ouzinkie, Alaska
- K07QZ in Chistochina, Alaska
- K07RC-D in Fort Yukon, Alaska
- K07RE in Anvik, Alaska
- K07RF in Haines, Alaska
- K07RV in Iliamna, Alaska
- K07RZ-D in Crooked Creek, Alaska
- K07SC in Hildale, etc., Utah
- K07SI in Whales Pass, Alaska
- K07SO in Port Moller, Alaska
- K07SP in Tetlin, Alaska
- K07SQ in Mentasta Lake, Alaska
- K07SR in Scammon Bay, Alaska
- K07TA in Santa Maria, California
- K07TJ in McGrath, Alaska
- K07TT in Levelock, Alaska
- K07UF in Abilene, Texas
- K07US in Samak, Utah
- K07UZ in Riverton, etc., Wyoming
- K07VE in Ticaboo, Utah
- K07VH-D in Sargents, Colorado
- K07VI in Challis, Idaho
- K07VL in Utahn, Utah
- K07YT in Mexican Hat, Utah
- K07YW in Bluff, Utah
- K07ZB-D in Mendenhall Valley, Alaska
- K07ZC-D in Ellensburg/Kittitas, Washington
- K07ZF in Calexico, California
- KASC-LP in Atascadero, California
- KETX-LP in Livingston, Texas
- KFLZ-CA in San Antonio, Texas
- KNHB-LP in Uvalde, Texas
- W07BA in Syracuse-Dewitt, New York
- W07BI in Schroon Lake, New York
- W07CL in Auburn, Indiana
- W07DB in Marquette, Michigan
- W07DN-D in Wardensville, etc., West Virginia
- WCBZ-LP in Baton Rouge, Louisiana
- WMGM-LP in Atlantic City, etc., New Jersey
- WNGA-LD in Salisbury, Maryland
- WRDH-LP in Ashton, Illinois
- WWJT-LP in Philadelphia, Pennsylvania
