= Bill Nguyen =

Vietnamese-American technology entrepreneur

- Bill Nguyễn
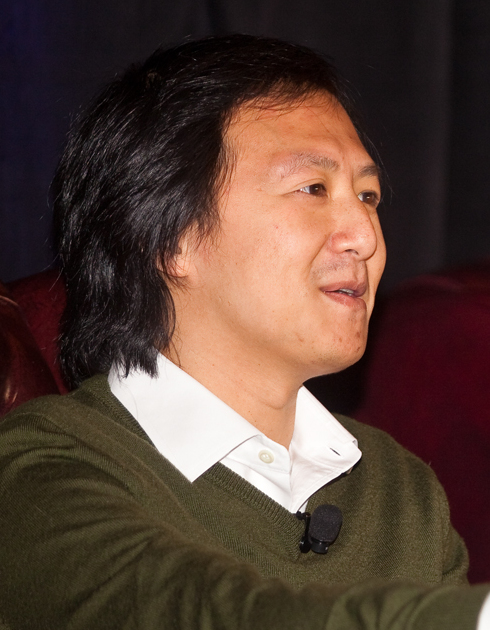
- Bill in 2011
- Born: 1971 (age 54–55); Vietnam
- Education: Houston Baptist University
- Occupation: Entrepreneur
- Known for: Founding LaLa.com music site which was later sold to Apple Inc.

Bill Nguyen (born 1971) is a Vietnamese-American technology entrepreneur. He is best known for founding music web site lala.com which was later acquired by Apple Inc. and incorporated into iTunes.

== Early life ==
Nguyen was born in Vietnam and immigrated to the United States at a young age with his parents. He grew up in Houston, the son of Vietnamese immigrants. He attended Strake Jesuit College Preparatory, graduating in 1991, then attended Houston Baptist University.

== Career ==
Nguyen headed business development and product management at the ForeFront Group, which was founded in 1992 and had their initial public offering in 1995. He served as vice president of products of FreeLoader which was founded in 1995 and sold in 1996.

Nguyen founded Onebox.com in 1999. It was acquired for $850 million in 1999 by Phone.com (later part of Openwave). He sold his stake quickly and started SEVEN Networks, a wireless e-mail firm that claimed 1.4 billion accounts. Nguyen founded Seven Networks in May 2000 and served as its co-chief executive officer until April 2005. In 2002, Nguyen was named to the MIT Technology Review TR100 as one of the top 100 innovators in the world under the age of 35.

Nguyen then co-founded La La Media Inc. in 2005 in Palo Alto, California. In 2006 Newsweek and Wired described the company as a mix of MySpace, Netflix, Napster and iTunes. The company bought and sold compact discs. Eventually, La La developed one of the first, free streaming music services. On December 5, 2009, Lala.com was acquired by Apple Inc. for an undisclosed sum. Apple announced that lala.com service was shut down on May 31, 2010. He was on the World Economic Forum's Young Global Leaders list in 2010.

Nguyen was a co-founder of Color labs, Inc. in 2010 and served as its chief executive officer, but had been away from day-to-day operations since July 2012. In 2012, Apple acquired Color labs for their engineering team and the Color service was closed in 2013.
