= Seven Regional =

Seven Regional or 7 Regional may refer to the following Australian television networks:

- Prime7, now 7 Regional
- GWN7, now Seven Regional WA

== See also ==
- Network seven (disambiguation)
