= 2016–17 New Orleans Pelicans season =

- Head coach: Alvin Gentry
- General manager: Dell Demps
- Owner: Tom Benson
- Arena: Smoothie King Center

Results
- Record: 34–48 (.415)
- Place: Division: 4th (Southwest); Conference: 10th (Western)
- Playoff finish: Did not qualify
- Stats at Basketball Reference

Local media
- Television: Fox Sports New Orleans
- Radio: WWL-FM

The 2016–17 New Orleans Pelicans season was the 15th season of the franchise in the National Basketball Association (NBA).

== Draft ==
Round	Pick	Player	Position	Nationality	College / Club
1	6	Buddy Hield	SG	Bahamas	Oklahoma
2	39	David Michineau	PG	(France) Guadeloupe	(France) Élan Chalon
2	40	Diamond Stone	C	United States	Maryland

All of the players drafted by the Pelicans this season would wind up being traded elsewhere sometime during the season. On June 23, 2016, both David Michineau and Diamond Stone would be traded to the Los Angeles Clippers in exchange for the Clippers' own second round pick in the draft, which was Cheick Diallo, a promising power forward who was born and raised in Mali, but ultimately played for the University of Kansas for one season before entering the 2016 NBA draft. Meanwhile, during the night of the 2017 NBA All-Star Game, the Pelicans would trade away their top pick of the draft, Buddy Hield, alongside Tyreke Evans, Langston Galloway, a Top-3 protected 2017 first round pick, and the Philadelphia 76ers' own second round pick in the 2017 NBA draft to the Sacramento Kings for their star center, DeMarcus Cousins, and Omri Casspi.

== Roster ==
2016–17 New Orleans Pelicans roster
Players

Pos.	No.	Player	Height	Weight	DOB	From
C	42	Alexis Ajinça	7 ft 2 in (2.18 m)	248 lb (112 kg)	1988-05-06	INSEP
C	3	Ömer Aşık	7 ft 0 in (2.13 m)	255 lb (116 kg)	1986-07-04	Turkey
PG	22	Quinn Cook	6 ft 2 in (1.88 m)	179 lb (81 kg)	1993-03-23	Duke
C	0	DeMarcus Cousins	6 ft 11 in (2.11 m)	270 lb (122 kg)	1990-08-13	Kentucky
SG	4	Jordan Crawford	6 ft 5 in (1.96 m)	195 lb (88 kg)	1988-10-23	Xavier
PF	33	Dante Cunningham	6 ft 8 in (2.03 m)	230 lb (104 kg)	1987-04-22	Villanova
PF	23	Anthony Davis	6 ft 11 in (2.11 m)	253 lb (115 kg)	1993-03-11	Kentucky
PF	13	Cheick Diallo (DL)	6 ft 9 in (2.06 m)	220 lb (100 kg)	1996-09-13	Kansas
PG	2	Tim Frazier	6 ft 1 in (1.85 m)	170 lb (77 kg)	1990-11-01	Penn State
SF	44	Solomon Hill	6 ft 7 in (2.01 m)	225 lb (102 kg)	1991-03-18	Arizona
PG	11	Jrue Holiday	6 ft 4 in (1.93 m)	205 lb (93 kg)	1990-06-12	UCLA
SG	55	E'Twaun Moore	6 ft 4 in (1.93 m)	191 lb (87 kg)	1989-02-25	Purdue
PF	12	Donatas Motiejūnas	7 ft 0 in (2.13 m)	222 lb (101 kg)	1990-09-20	Lithuania
G/F	20	Quincy Pondexter	6 ft 7 in (2.01 m)	225 lb (102 kg)	1988-03-10	Washington
SF	10	Axel Toupane (DL)	6 ft 7 in (2.01 m)	197 lb (89 kg)	1992-07-23	France

Coaches
Head coach
- Alvin Gentry
Assistant(s)
- Darren Erman
- Robert Pack
- Phil Weber
- Fred Vinson
- Kevin Hanson
- Jamelle McMillan
- Elvis Valcarcel
- Jason Sumerlin (strength and conditioning)
- Duane Brooks (trainer)

Legend
- (DP) Unsigned draft pick
- (FA) Free agent
- (S) Suspended
- (DL) On assignment to D-League affiliate
- Injured

Roster
Updated: April 11, 2017

== All-Star Game ==
The Pelicans were the hosts for the NBA All-Star Game in 2017. Anthony Davis was selected by fan voting to the starting front court for the game. Anthony Davis would also receive the All-Star Game's MVP award for his production during the All-Star Game. After the All-Star Game was over, it was announced that the Pelicans would make a blockbuster move to trade their rookie Buddy Hield, Tyreke Evans, Langston Galloway, a Top-3 protected 2017 first round pick, and the Philadelphia 76ers' own 2017 second round pick to the Sacramento Kings for fellow All-Star center DeMarcus Cousins and Omri Casspi. The move would be officially done a day later.

== Standings ==
=== Division ===
Southwest Division	W	L	PCT	GB	Home	Road	Div	GP
y – San Antonio Spurs	61	21	.744	–	31‍–‍10	30‍–‍11	11–5	82
x – Houston Rockets	55	27	.671	6.0	30‍–‍11	25‍–‍16	10–6	82
x – Memphis Grizzlies	43	39	.524	18.0	24‍–‍17	19‍–‍22	8–8	82
e – New Orleans Pelicans	34	48	.415	27.0	21‍–‍20	13‍–‍28	6–10	82
e – Dallas Mavericks	33	49	.402	28.0	21‍–‍20	12‍–‍29	5–11	82

=== Conference ===
Western Conference
#	Team	W	L	PCT	GB	GP
1	z – Golden State Warriors *	67	15	.817	–	82
2	y – San Antonio Spurs *	61	21	.744	6.0	82
3	x – Houston Rockets	55	27	.671	12.0	82
4	x – Los Angeles Clippers	51	31	.622	16.0	82
5	y – Utah Jazz *	51	31	.622	16.0	82
6	x – Oklahoma City Thunder	47	35	.573	20.0	82
7	x – Memphis Grizzlies	43	39	.524	24.0	82
8	x – Portland Trail Blazers	41	41	.500	26.0	82
9	e – Denver Nuggets	40	42	.488	27.0	82
10	e – New Orleans Pelicans	34	48	.415	33.0	82
11	e – Dallas Mavericks	33	49	.402	34.0	82
12	e – Sacramento Kings	32	50	.390	35.0	82
13	e – Minnesota Timberwolves	31	51	.378	36.0	82
14	e – Los Angeles Lakers	26	56	.317	41.0	82
15	e – Phoenix Suns	24	58	.293	43.0	82

== Game log ==
=== Pre-season ===
2016 pre-season game log
Total: 1–5 (Home: 1–2; Road: 0–3)
Pre-season: 1–5 (home: 1–2; road: 0–3)

Game	Date	Team	Score	High points	High rebounds	High assists	Location Attendance	Record
1	October 1	Dallas	W 116–102	Hield, Moore (19)	Frazier, Hield (6)	Tim Frazier (9)	CenturyLink Center (Bossier City); 6,752	1–0
2	October 4	Indiana	L 96–113	Buddy Hield (18)	Alexis Ajinca (8)	Tim Frazier (7)	Smoothie King Center; 15,369	1–1
3	October 9	@ Houston	L 117–123	E'Twaun Moore (25)	Omer Asik (14)	Tim Frazier (9)	Mercedes-Benz Arena (Shanghai); 15,844	1–2
4	October 12	Houston	L 104–116	Quinn Cook (20)	Diallo, Hill (7)	Quinn Cook (8)	LeSports Center (Beijing); 14,498	1–3
5	October 18	@ Atlanta	L 89–96	Terrence Jones (18)	Alexis Ajinca (7)	Tim Frazier (6)	Philips Arena; 10,866	1–4
6	October 20	@ Orlando	L 111–114 (OT)	Anthony Davis (33)	Anthony Davis (13)	Tim Frazier (7)	Amway Center; 14,901	1–5

2016–17 season schedule

=== Regular season ===
2016–17 game log
Total: 34–48 (Home: 21–20; Road: 13–28)
October: 0–3 (home: 0–2; road: 0–1)

Game	Date	Team	Score	High points	High rebounds	High assists	Location Attendance	Record
1	October 26	Denver	L 102–107	Anthony Davis (50)	Anthony Davis (16)	Tim Frazier (11)	Smoothie King Center; 15,869	0–1
2	October 28	Golden State	L 114–122	Anthony Davis (45)	Anthony Davis (17)	Tim Frazier (10)	Smoothie King Center; 18,217	0–2
3	October 29	@ San Antonio	L 79–98	Davis, Moore (18)	Ömer Aşık (7)	Tim Frazier (7)	AT&T Center; 18,418	0–3

November : 7–9 (home: 5–3; road: 2–6)

Game	Date	Team	Score	High points	High rebounds	High assists	Location Attendance	Record
4	November 1	Milwaukee	L 113–117	Anthony Davis (35)	Anthony Davis (15)	Tim Frazier (8)	Smoothie King Center; 18,217	0–4
5	November 2	@ Memphis	L 83–89 (OT)	Lance Stephenson (21)	Ömer Aşık (11)	Lance Stephenson (6)	FedExForum; 15,881	0–5
6	November 4	Phoenix	L 111–112 (OT)	Anthony Davis (22)	Anthony Davis (11)	Lance Stephenson (7)	Smoothie King Center; 15,379	0–6
7	November 7	@ Golden State	L 106–116	Anthony Davis (33)	Anthony Davis (12)	Tim Frazier (10)	Oracle Arena; 19,596	0–7
8	November 8	@ Sacramento	L 94–102	Anthony Davis (34)	Ömer Aşık (9)	Tim Frazier (9)	Golden 1 Center; 17,608	0–8
9	November 10	@ Milwaukee	W 112–106	Anthony Davis (32)	Anthony Davis (8)	Tim Frazier (10)	BMO Harris Bradley Center; 12,159	1–8
10	November 12	LA Lakers	L 99–126	Anthony Davis (34)	Anthony Davis (8)	Tim Frazier (10)	Smoothie King Center; 17,138	1–9
11	November 14	Boston	W 106–105	Anthony Davis (25)	Anthony Davis (16)	Tim Frazier (6)	Smoothie King Center; 15,001	2–9
12	November 16	@ Orlando	L 82–89	Terrence Jones (26)	Ömer Aşık (10)	Buddy Hield (5)	Amway Center; 16,127	2–10
13	November 18	Portland	W 113–101	Anthony Davis (38)	Anthony Davis (9)	Tim Frazier (8)	Smoothie King Center; 15,552	3–10
14	November 19	Charlotte	W 121–116 (OT)	Anthony Davis (38)	Anthony Davis (16)	Jrue Holiday (9)	Smoothie King Center; 15,739	4–10
15	November 22	@ Atlanta	W 112–94	Tim Frazier (21)	Jones, Asik (6)	Tim Frazier (14)	Philips Arena; 19,120	5–10
16	November 23	Minnesota	W 117–96	Anthony Davis (42)	Anthony Davis (10)	Holiday, Frazier (8)	Smoothie King Center; 15,555	6–10
17	November 25	@ Portland	L 104–119	Anthony Davis (31)	Anthony Davis (13)	Tim Frazier (7)	Moda Center; 19,393	6–11
18	November 27	@ Dallas	L 81–91	Anthony Davis (36)	Anthony Davis (13)	Jrue Holiday (6)	American Airlines Center; 19,302	6–12
19	November 29	LA Lakers	W 105–88	Anthony Davis (41)	Anthony Davis (16)	Holiday, Frazier, Moore (5)	Smoothie King Center; 14,024	7–12

December : 7–9 (home: 5–5; road: 2–4)

Game	Date	Team	Score	High points	High rebounds	High assists	Location Attendance	Record
20	December 2	LA Clippers	L 96–114	Anthony Davis (21)	Terrence Jones (9)	Tim Frazier (8)	Smoothie King Center; 16,538	7–13
21	December 4	@ Oklahoma City	L 92–101	Anthony Davis (37)	Anthony Davis (15)	Jrue Holiday (7)	Chesapeake Energy Arena; 18,203	7–14
22	December 5	Memphis	L 108–110 (2OT)	Anthony Davis (28)	Anthony Davis (19)	Tim Frazier (9)	Smoothie King Center; 13,795	7–15
23	December 8	Philadelphia	L 88–99	Anthony Davis (26)	Anthony Davis (11)	Tim Frazier (6)	Smoothie King Center; 14,158	7–16
24	December 10	@ LA Clippers	L 105–133	Tim Frazier (20)	Cheick Diallo (10)	Tim Frazier (11)	Staples Center; 19,090	7–17
25	December 11	@ Phoenix	W 120–119 (OT)	Jrue Holiday (23)	Anthony Davis (12)	Tim Frazier (11)	Talking Stick Resort Arena; 16,949	8–17
26	December 13	Golden State	L 109–113	Anthony Davis (28)	Terrence Jones (10)	Tim Frazier (8)	Smoothie King Center; 17,789	8–18
27	December 15	Indiana	W 102–95	Anthony Davis (35)	Anthony Davis (16)	Jrue Holiday (14)	Smoothie King Center; 15,472	9–18
28	December 16	@ Houston	L 100–122	Anthony Davis (19)	Ajinca, Jones (8)	Tim Frazier (5)	Toyota Center; 16,728	9–19
29	December 18	@ San Antonio	L 100–113	Alexis Ajinca (16)	Alexis Ajinca (8)	Tim Frazier (7)	AT&T Center; 18,615	9–20
30	December 20	@ Philadelphia	W 108–93	Anthony Davis (31)	Anthony Davis (16)	Jrue Holiday (9)	Wells Fargo Center; 16,322	10–20
31	December 21	Oklahoma City	L 110–121	Anthony Davis (34)	Anthony Davis (15)	Jrue Holiday (10)	Smoothie King Center; 15,472	10–21
32	December 23	Miami	W 91–87	Anthony Davis (28)	Anthony Davis (22)	Jrue Holiday (6)	Smoothie King Center; 16,322	11–21
33	December 26	Dallas	W 111–104	Anthony Davis (28)	Anthony Davis (16)	Jrue Holiday (11)	Smoothie King Center; 15,764	12–21
34	December 28	LA Clippers	W 102–98	Anthony Davis (20)	Dante Cunningham (9)	Jrue Holiday (9)	Smoothie King Center; 16,647	13–21
35	December 30	New York	W 104–92	Anthony Davis (23)	Anthony Davis (18)	Jrue Holiday (11)	Smoothie King Center; 18,124	14–21

January : 5–9 (home: 3–4; road: 2–5)

Game	Date	Team	Score	High points	High rebounds	High assists	Location Attendance	Record
36	January 2	@ Cleveland	L 82–90	Davis, Hield (20)	Anthony Davis (17)	Jrue Holiday (13)	Quicken Loans Arena; 20,562	14–22
37	January 5	Atlanta	L 94–99	Anthony Davis (20)	Anthony Davis (19)	Jrue Holiday (5)	Smoothie King Center; 15,003	14–23
38	January 7	@ Boston	L 108–117	Anthony Davis (36)	Anthony Davis (15)	Tyreke Evans (6)	TD Garden; 18,624	14–24
39	January 9	@ New York	W 110–96	Anthony Davis (40)	Anthony Davis (18)	Jrue Holiday (7)	Madison Square Garden; 19,812	15–24
40	January 12	@ Brooklyn	W 104–95	Tyreke Evans (29)	Terrence Jones (12)	Jrue Holiday (4)	Barclays Center; 14,352	16–24
41	January 14	@ Chicago	L 99–107	Anthony Davis (36)	Anthony Davis (14)	Jrue Holiday (12)	United Center; 21,916	16–25
42	January 16	@ Indiana	L 95–98	Anthony Davis (16)	Terrence Jones (8)	Jrue Holiday (6)	Bankers Life Fieldhouse; 15,525	16–26
43	January 18	Orlando	W 118–98	Anthony Davis (21)	Anthony Davis (14)	Evans, Holiday (5)	Smoothie King Center; 15,818	17–26
44	January 20	Brooklyn	L 114–143	Anthony Davis (22)	Anthony Davis (9)	Jrue Holiday (8)	Smoothie King Center; 17,004	17–27
45	January 23	Cleveland	W 124–122	Terrence Jones (36)	Terrence Jones (11)	Jrue Holiday (10)	Smoothie King Center; 17,758	18–27
46	January 25	Oklahoma City	L 105–114	E'Twaun Moore (18)	Moore, Hill (8)	Tyreke Evans (9)	Smoothie King Center; 15,277	18–28
47	January 27	San Antonio	W 119–103	Jrue Holiday (23)	Anthony Davis (22)	Jrue Holiday (11)	Smoothie King Center; 17,757	19–28
48	January 29	Washington	L 94–107	Anthony Davis (36)	Anthony Davis (17)	Jrue Holiday (11)	Smoothie King Center; 16,779	19–29
49	January 31	@ Toronto	L 106–108 (OT)	Jrue Holiday (30)	Anthony Davis (17)	Terrence Jones (4)	Air Canada Centre; 19,800	19–30

February : 4–7 (home: 1–2; road: 3–5)

Game	Date	Team	Score	High points	High rebounds	High assists	Location Attendance	Record
50	February 1	@ Detroit	L 98–118	Anthony Davis (31)	Anthony Davis (12)	Jrue Holiday (11)	Palace of Auburn Hills; 14,262	19–31
51	February 4	@ Washington	L 91–105	Anthony Davis (25)	Davis, Holiday (10)	Jrue Holiday (8)	Verizon Center; 19,651	19–32
52	February 6	Phoenix	W 111–106	Anthony Davis (34)	Davis, Holiday, Jones (9)	Jrue Holiday (7)	Smoothie King Center; 15,888	20–32
53	February 8	Utah	L 94–127	Terrence Jones (21)	Anthony Davis (10)	Tim Frazier (4)	Smoothie King Center; 14,508	20–33
54	February 10	@ Minnesota	W 122–106	Anthony Davis (42)	Anthony Davis (13)	Jrue Holiday (12)	Target Center; 16,093	21–33
55	February 12	@ Sacramento	L 99–105	Anthony Davis (32)	Anthony Davis (10)	Jrue Holiday (11)	Golden 1 Center; 17,608	21–34
56	February 13	@ Phoenix	W 110–108	Anthony Davis (24)	Anthony Davis (10)	Jrue Holiday (8)	Golden 1 Center; 16,321	22–34
57	February 15	@ Memphis	W 95–91	Jrue Holiday (19)	Alexis Ajinca (10)	Jrue Holiday (7)	FedExForum; 16,145	23–34
58	February 23	Houston	L 99–129	Anthony Davis (29)	DeMarcus Cousins (14)	Hill, Frazier, Cousins (5)	Smoothie King Center; 18,470	23–35
59	February 25	@ Dallas	L 83–96	Anthony Davis (39)	DeMarcus Cousins (15)	Cousins, Holiday (6)	American Airlines Center; 20,411	23–36
60	February 26	@ Oklahoma City	L 110–118	Anthony Davis (38)	DeMarcus Cousins (10)	Jrue Holiday (8)	Chesapeake Energy Arena; 18,203	23–37

March : 10–6 (home: 7–2; road: 3–4)

Game	Date	Team	Score	High points	High rebounds	High assists	Location Attendance	Record
61	March 1	Detroit	W 109–86	Anthony Davis (33)	Anthony Davis (14)	Jrue Holiday (5)	Smoothie King Center; 14,406	24–37
62	March 3	San Antonio	L 98–101 (OT)	Anthony Davis (29)	DeMarcus Cousins (23)	Jrue Holiday (5)	Smoothie King Center; 17,669	24–38
63	March 5	@ LA Lakers	W 105–97	DeMarcus Cousins (31)	Anthony Davis (12)	Jrue Holiday (12)	Staples Center; 18,997	25–38
64	March 6	@ Utah	L 83–88	Anthony Davis (20)	Anthony Davis (12)	Frazier, Holiday, Cousins, Crawford (3)	Vivint Smart Home Arena; 19,649	25–39
65	March 8	Toronto	L 87–94	DeMarcus Cousins (25)	DeMarcus Cousins (10)	Jrue Holiday (6)	Smoothie King Center; 14,543	25–40
66	March 11	@ Charlotte	W 125–122 (OT)	Anthony Davis (46)	Anthony Davis (21)	Jrue Holiday (13)	Spectrum Center; 18,196	26–40
67	March 14	Portland	W 100–77	DeMarcus Cousins (22)	Anthony Davis (15)	Tim Frazier (7)	Smoothie King Center; 15,530	27–40
68	March 15	@ Miami	L 112–120	Anthony Davis (27)	DeMarcus Cousins (9)	Jrue Holiday (8)	American Airlines Arena; 19,678	27–41
69	March 17	Houston	W 128–112	Solomon Hill (30)	Anthony Davis (15)	Solomon Hill (7)	Smoothie King Center; 17,972	28–41
70	March 19	Minnesota	W 123–109	Anthony Davis (28)	DeMarcus Cousins (11)	Tim Frazier (8)	Smoothie King Center; 16,111	29–41
71	March 21	Memphis	W 95–82	DeMarcus Cousins (41)	DeMarcus Cousins (17)	Jrue Holiday (6)	Smoothie King Center; 15,973	30–41
72	March 24	@ Houston	L 107–117	Anthony Davis (33)	Anthony Davis (16)	Jrue Holiday (9)	Toyota Center; 18,055	30–42
73	March 26	@ Denver	W 115–90	Anthony Davis (31)	Anthony Davis (15)	Tim Frazier (8)	Pepsi Center; 19,850	31–42
74	March 27	@ Utah	L 100–108	Anthony Davis (36)	Anthony Davis (17)	Tim Frazier (6)	Vivint Smart Home Arena; 18,924	31–43
75	March 29	Dallas	W 121–118	Anthony Davis (29)	Anthony Davis (16)	Jrue Holiday (7)	Smoothie King Center; 16,000	32–43
76	March 31	Sacramento	W 117–89	DeMarcus Cousins (37)	DeMarcus Cousins (13)	Jrue Holiday (8)	Smoothie King Center; 17,304	33–43

April : 1–5 (home: 0–2; road: 1–3)

Game	Date	Team	Score	High points	High rebounds	High assists	Location Attendance	Record
77	April 2	Chicago	L 110–117	Anthony Davis (30)	DeMarcus Cousins (18)	Jrue Holiday (6)	Smoothie King Center; 18,306	33–44
78	April 4	Denver	L 131–134	Anthony Davis (41)	DeMarcus Cousins (14)	Jrue Holiday (13)	Smoothie King Center; 16,050	33–45
79	April 7	@ Denver	L 106–122	Anthony Davis (25)	Alexis Ajinca (7)	Jrue Holiday (7)	Pepsi Center; 16,348	33–46
80	April 8	@ Golden State	L 101–123	Jordan Crawford (19)	Cheick Diallo (9)	Jrue Holiday (10)	Oracle Arena; 19,596	33−47
81	April 11	@ L.A. Lakers	L 96–108	Cheick Diallo (19)	Cheick Diallo (11)	Crawford, Holiday (7)	Staples Center; 18,997	33–48
82	April 12	@ Portland	W 103–100	Jordan Crawford (15)	Cheick Diallo (16)	Tim Frazier (8)	Moda Center; 19,521	34–48

2016–17 season schedule

== Player statistics ==
Legend
GP	Games played	GS	Games started	MPG	Minutes per game
FG%	Field-goal percentage	3P%	3-point field-goal percentage	FT%	Free-throw percentage
RPG	Rebounds per game	APG	Assists per game	SPG	Steals per game
BPG	Blocks per game	PPG	Points per game

=== Regular season ===
New Orleans Pelicans statistics
Player	GP	GS	MPG	FG%	3P%	FT%	RPG	APG	SPG	BPG	PPG
Solomon Hill	80	71	29.7	.383	.348	.805	3.8	1.8	.9	.4	7.0
Anthony Davis	75	75	36.1	.505	.299	.802	11.8	2.1	1.3	2.2	28.0
E'Twaun Moore	73	22	24.9	.457	.370	.770	2.1	2.2	.7	.4	9.6
Jrue Holiday	67	61	32.7	.454	.356	.708	3.9	7.3	1.5	.7	15.4
Dante Cunningham	66	35	25.0	.485	.392	.593	4.2	.6	.6	.4	6.6
Tim Frazier	65	35	23.5	.403	.313	.760	2.7	5.2	.9	.1	7.1
Buddy Hield^{†}	57	37	20.4	.393	.369	.879	2.9	1.4	.3	.1	8.6
Langston Galloway^{†}	55	0	20.4	.374	.377	.769	2.2	1.2	.7	.1	8.6
Terrence Jones^{†}	51	12	24.8	.472	.253	.606	5.9	1.2	.8	1.0	11.5
Alexis Ajinça	39	15	15.0	.500	.000	.725	4.5	.3	.5	.6	5.3
Donatas Motiejūnas	34	0	14.1	.413	.234	.510	3.0	.9	.5	.3	4.4
Ömer Aşık	31	19	15.5	.477		.590	5.3	.5	.2	.3	2.7
Tyreke Evans^{†}	26	0	18.2	.401	.300	.776	3.3	3.5	.9	.2	9.5
Jordan Crawford	19	0	23.3	.482	.389	.769	1.8	3.0	.6	.1	14.1
DeMarcus Cousins^{†}	17	17	33.8	.452	.375	.777	12.4	3.9	1.5	1.1	24.4
Cheick Diallo	17	0	11.7	.474		.714	4.3	.2	.2	.4	5.1
Hollis Thompson^{†}	9	8	21.2	.268	.250	.667	3.1	1.0	.7	.0	3.8
Anthony Brown^{†}	9	0	15.9	.341	.250		2.9	.7	.6	.1	3.8
Quinn Cook^{†}	9	0	12.3	.537	.500	.667	.4	1.6	.3	.0	5.8
Lance Stephenson^{†}	6	0	27.0	.473	.100	.625	3.0	4.8	.3	.2	9.7
Reggie Williams	6	0	13.2	.348	.455	.857	1.0	.7	.5	.0	4.5
Wayne Selden Jr.^{†}	3	3	15.7	.625	.571	.500	1.7	.3	.7	.0	5.3
Archie Goodwin^{†}	3	0	10.0	.400	.500	1.000	.0	.3	.0	.3	5.0
Axel Toupane^{†}	2	0	20.5	.625	.333		.5	.0	.5	.5	5.5
Jarrett Jack	2	0	16.5	.667	.000	1.000	.0	2.5	1.0	.0	3.0
Omri Casspi^{†}	1	0	24.0	.556	.500		2.0	.0	.0	.0	12.0

- ^{†} Denotes player spent time with another team in the season. Stats reflect time with the Pelicans only.

== Transactions ==
=== Trades ===
June 23, 2016	To New Orleans Pelicans (Mali) Cheick Diallo (Pick 33)	To Los Angeles Clippers (France) David Michineau (Pick 39) (United States) Diamond Stone (Pick 40)
July 10, 2016	To New Orleans Pelicans 2018 New Orleans 2nd-round pick Cash considerations	To Miami Heat (United States) Luke Babbitt
February 20, 2017	To New Orleans Pelicans (United States) DeMarcus Cousins (Israel) Omri Casspi	To Sacramento Kings (The Bahamas) Buddy Hield (United States) Tyreke Evans (United States) Langston Galloway; 2017 protected 1st-round pick 2017 Philadelphia 2nd-round pick

=== Free agency ===
==== Re-signed ====
Player	Signed
Tim Frazier	2-year contract worth $4 million

==== Additions ====
Player	Signed	Former team
Solomon Hill	4-year contract worth $48 million	Indiana Pacers
E'Twaun Moore	4-year contract worth $34 million	Chicago Bulls
Langston Galloway	2-year contract worth $10.7 million	New York Knicks
Terrence Jones	1-year contract worth $980,431	Houston Rockets
Lance Stephenson	1-year contract worth $1.2 million	Memphis Grizzlies
Reggie Williams		Oklahoma City Blue
Donatas Motiejūnas	1-year contract worth $1.1 million	Houston Rockets
Jarrett Jack		Brooklyn Nets

==== Subtractions ====
Player	Reason left	New team
Bryce Dejean-Jones	Died during offseason (Shot to death)	—N/a (Deceased)
Lance Stephenson	Waived	Minnesota Timberwolves
Archie Goodwin	Waived	Greensboro Swarm
Anthony Brown	Waived	Orlando Magic / Erie Bayhawks
Omri Casspi	Waived	
