= Tim Frazier =

American basketball player (born 1990)

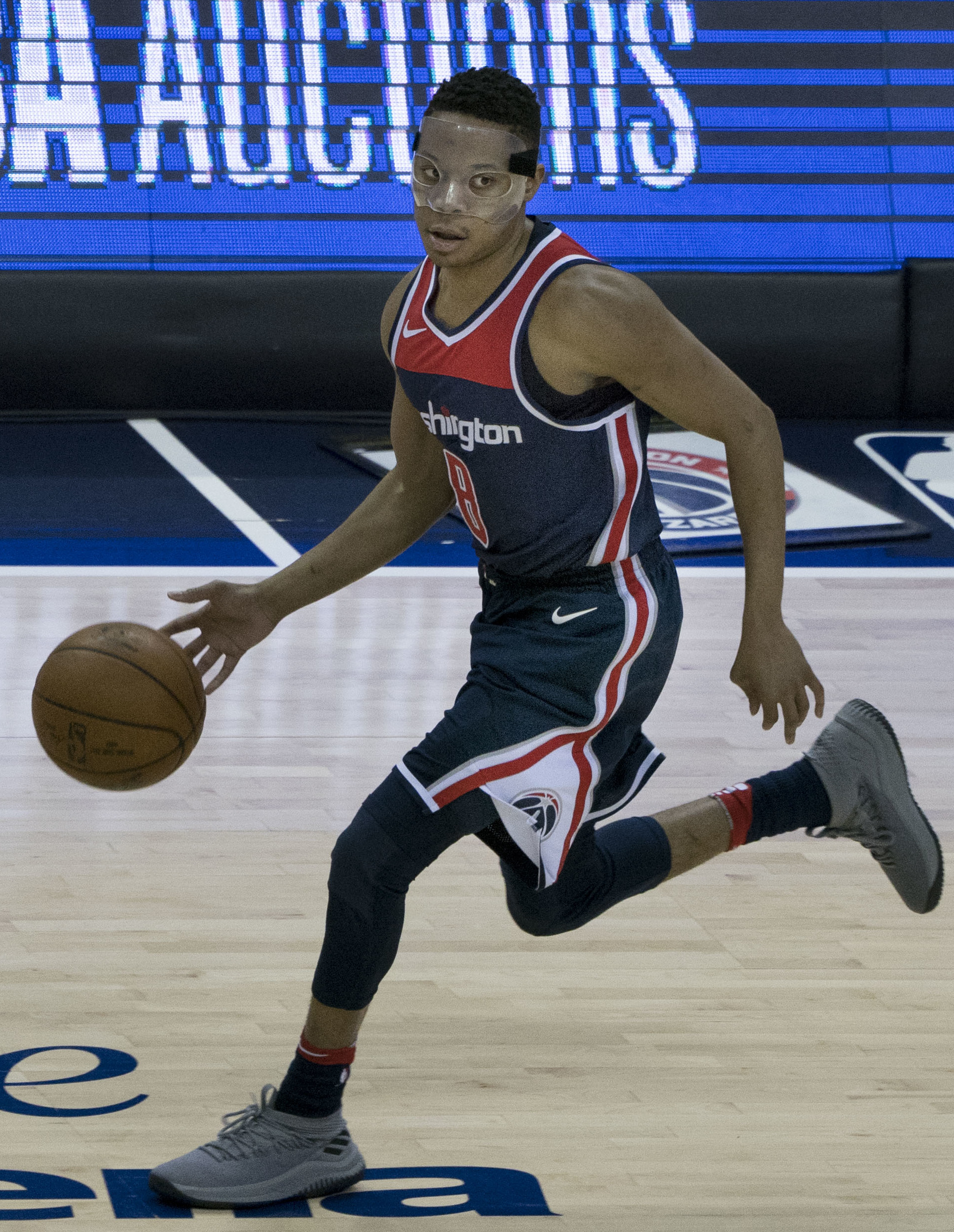
- Frazier with the Washington Wizards in 2018

Free agent
- Position: Point guard

Personal information
- Born: November 1, 1990 (age 36) Waco, Texas, U.S.
- Listed height: 6 ft 0 in (1.83 m)
- Listed weight: 169 lb (77 kg)

Career information
- High school: Strake Jesuit (Houston, Texas)
- College: Penn State (2009–2014)
- NBA draft: 2014: undrafted
- Playing career: 2014–present

Career history
- 2014–2016: Maine Red Claws
- 2015: Philadelphia 76ers
- 2015–2016: Portland Trail Blazers
- 2016–2017: New Orleans Pelicans
- 2017–2018: Washington Wizards
- 2018–2019: New Orleans Pelicans
- 2019: Milwaukee Bucks
- 2019–2020: Detroit Pistons
- 2020–2021: Memphis Grizzlies
- 2021–2022: Orlando Magic
- 2022: Cleveland Cavaliers
- 2022–2023: AEK Athens
- 2023: SIG Strasbourg
- 2023: Promitheas Patras
- 2023–2024: Metropolitans 92
- 2024–2025: Ironi Nahariyah
- 2025–2026: Minas

Career highlights
- NBA D-League MVP (2015); NBA D-League All-Star (2015); All-NBA D-League First Team (2015); NBA D-League All-Defensive Second Team (2015); NBA D-League Rookie of the Year (2015); NBA D-League All-Rookie First Team (2015); First-team All-Big Ten (2012); Third-team All-Big Ten (2014); Big Ten All-Defensive Team (2012)
- Stats at NBA.com
- Stats at Basketball Reference

Tim Frazier (born November 1, 1990) is an American professional basketball player who last played for the Minas in Novo Basquete Brasil. Frazier played high school basketball for Strake Jesuit College Preparatory and competed at the collegiate level with Penn State as a point guard. He earned various accolades with Penn State, including first-team All-Big Ten and All-Big Ten Defensive team honors, both as a junior in 2012. Frazier has played nine seasons in the NBA, with eight different franchises.

== Early life ==
Frazier was born on November 1, 1990, in Houston, Texas, to Billy and Janice. He started playing basketball when he was five years old. He would knock down the trophies of his sister and challenge his sister Krystal to games. His sister later said, "Most people learn basketball early on with a one-on-one kind of mentality... Tim at an early age didn't have that. He always wanted to make the team better and do whatever it takes to help the team out. He is such a true point guard." In his childhood, he was considered too small for contact sports but was noted for his quickness, which helped him thrive as a guard on the court.

== High school career ==
Frazier attended Strake Jesuit College Preparatory in Houston, Texas. He completed his junior year with 11.5 points, 5.5 rebounds, and 3.0 steals per game. Frazier was named District 17-5A Defensive Player of the Year. In his senior season, he averaged 15.5 points, 7.7 rebounds, 5.5 assists, and 3.6 steals per game, leading the team to a 37–1 record. He, alongside fellow DI signees Joey Brooks & Steven Rogers, helped them become the first private school to reach the state tournament's semifinals. Frazier commented on his final year with Strake Jesuit in an interview with BlueWhiteIllustrated.com. "My game, I don't know, it just hit that next level," he said.

After completing his senior year with Strake Jesuit, Frazier was ranked the 20th-best point guard of his class, the 110th-most-valuable player overall, and a three-star recruit by Rivals.com. According to TexasHoops.com, he was the best recruit in the state, and the Houston Chronicle labeled him the Boys Basketball Player of the Year. Frazier played with the Houston Elite Amateur Athletic Union team, which had produced players such as Anthony Thompson, Eddren McCain and Chris Roberts, all of whom attended Bradley University. He graduated high school cum laude.

On October 23, 2008, Frazier verbally committed to the Penn State Nittany Lions basketball team. He said to Scout.com, "I decided to be a Nittany Lion because I felt it was a great fit for me. Penn State has great academics as well as a great basketball team and that's what I was looking for." Frazier also said that he had a "great time" on his official visit and all his relatives supported the decision. He received offers from various other schools across the country, including Bradley, Colorado State, New Mexico State, Santa Clara, Stanford, Stephen F. Austin, and UTEP. Frazier was also visited by San Diego, TCU, and Penn State, spanning from September to October 2008. After the move was made official, head coach Ed DeChellis said, "We are very excited to have Tim join our program. He is a very fast, quick player with tremendous speed in the backcourt and a good shooter. He possesses the kind of athleticism that Stanley Pringle does. He can get in the lane and find open guys and is a great drive and kick passer and he can score. He is a very good on-the-ball defender and a tremendous athlete and we think he really solidifies our backcourt for the future."

College recruiting
Name	Hometown	School	Height	Weight	Commit date
Tim Frazier; PG	Houston, Texas	Strake Jesuit	6 ft 2 in (1.88 m)	160 lb (73 kg)	Sep 5, 2008
Tim Frazier; PG	Recruit ratings: Rivals: 247Sports: (89)				
Overall recruit ranking: Rivals: 110 (SF)
Note: In many cases, Scout, Rivals, 247Sports, On3, and ESPN may conflict in their listings of height and weight.; In these cases, the average was taken. ESPN grades are on a 100-point scale.; Sources: "Penn State Nittany Lions 2009 Player Commits". ESPN.; "2009 Team Ranking". Rivals.

== College career ==
=== Freshman ===
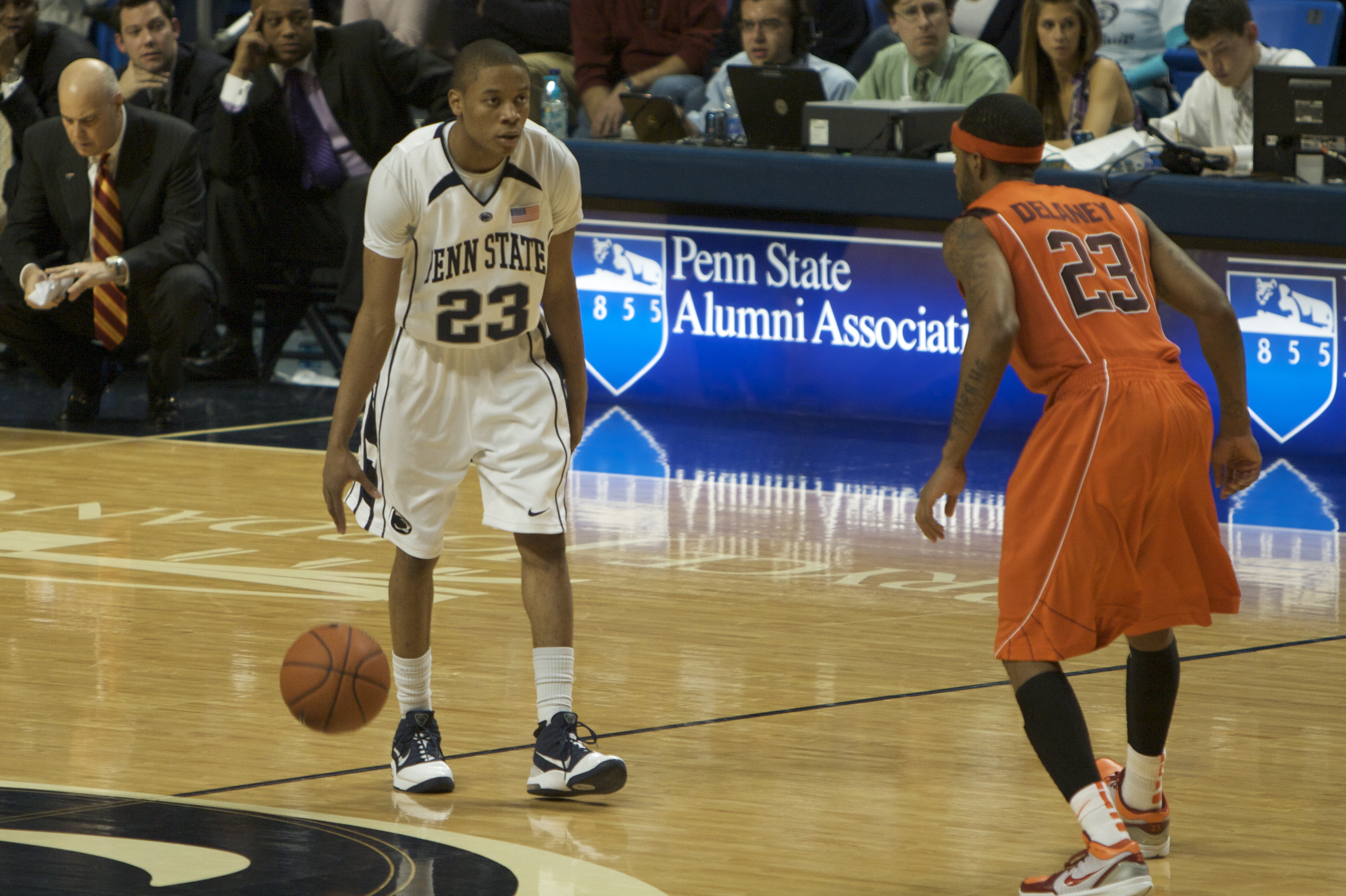
Frazier dribbles against Malcolm Delaney of Virginia Tech

Prior to the start of his freshman year, Frazier recorded a team-high 34-inch vertical in Penn State's preseason workouts. He also matched the 2009 NBA Draft Combine record, and surpassed the event's best lane agility time. Frazier did not participate in Penn State's exhibition opener against Slippery Rock. Coach DeChellis said, "Billy Oliver, Sasa [Borovnjak], Tim Frazier, Jermaine Marshall, they haven't played in this yet, so it was important just to get out there." In his first official appearance against Pennsylvania, Frazier added 2 assists and 1 rebound in a scoreless performance. He was only allowed 8 minutes of play time. He scored his first points against Robert Morris the following contest, with a game-high 19 points off the bench. He shot 6-of-11 from the field, and 4-of-5 on three-pointers. Frazier also contributed 3 assists, 2 rebounds, and 1 steal in 30 minutes on the court. DeChellis said, "(Tim) is a hard guy to contain. If he starts making perimeter shots, then we're that much better. We've seen him where he can make shots in practice and do pretty well. We just needed to get him some confidence and get him into the flow." The game would remain a season high for him under the scoring category. Frazier was awarded his first start as a shooting guard on November 22, 2009, against Davidson; he registered 7 points, 5 rebounds, 3 assists, and 3 steals. He recorded a season-high 34 minutes. He finished the 2009–10 season averaging 5.0 points, 2.3 rebounds, 2.4 assists, 0.7 steals, and 1.7 turnovers. He played in all 31 regular season games.

=== Sophomore ===
Frazier made his sophomore debut on November 7, 2010, in an exhibition game against East Stroudsburg. He added 10 points, 6 assists, and two steals. Frazier also recorded a team-high 4 turnovers. DeChellis commented, "Offensively we were poor tonight and we had too many turnovers ... something we've struggled with in practice." On November 12, 2010, Frazier made his second appearance as a sophomore with 6 points, 7 rebounds, 6 assists, and 1 steal. He shot 1-of-5 on field goals, while going a perfect 4-of-4 from the free-throw line. Frazier was named the game's starting shooting guard and was allowed 30 minutes of playing time. He made his first-ever appearance as Penn State's starting point guard on November 19 versus Fairfield, and contributed 3 points, 4 rebounds, 7 assists, and 1 steal. The team's coach commented on Frazier's powerful defensive performance, "thought Tim Frazier did a very nice job defensively on the point guard for Fairfield who is a really good player. He bothered him all night." Frazier made his first impression above the 10-point barrier on January 15, 2011, versus Ohio State, with 11 points, 6 rebounds, and 5 assists. He shot 4-of-4 from the field and made three of four free throws. On March 12, 2011, Frazier scored 22 points against Michigan State, his season-high as a sophomore, helping the team pull off the upset victory in the semifinals of the 2011 Big Ten Conference men's basketball tournament. He played in his first NCAA tournament game against Temple, contributing 15 points, 7 assists, 5 rebounds, and 2 steals. He made a late miscue guarding Juan Fernández, allowing the opposing guard to close out the game with under one second remaining in regulation. Frazier recalled the moment, "I closed out high end so he wouldn't be able to shoot over me. (He) made a great move, pivoted a couple of times and then stepped through." Fernández said, "I was thinking about shooting a jump shot but I killed my dribble and (Tim) Frazier was right there. For some reason he jumped over to my right and that gave me the space to go left." By the end of the season, Frazier averaged 6.3 points, 5.1 assists, 3.9 rebounds, 1.0 steals, and 0.1 blocks per game. He was named to the Academic All-Big Ten following 2010–11.

=== Junior ===
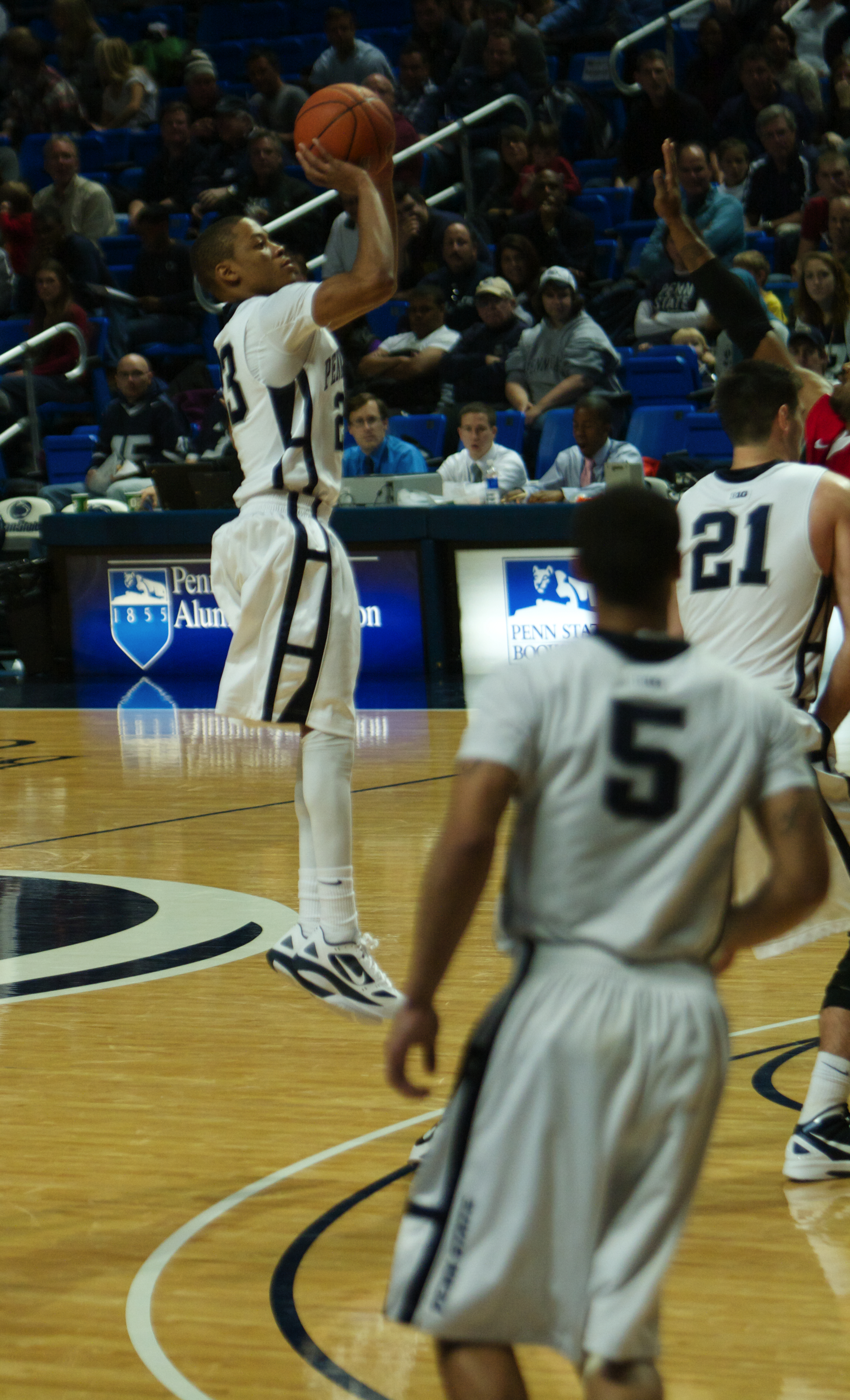
Frazier shoots a three-pointer vs Hartford in 2011

Frazier opened his junior season, and his first year under coach Pat Chambers, on November 5, 2011, in an exhibition game against Slippery Rock. He led the team in scoring with 19 points. Frazier also posted 7 assists and 6 rebounds, helping Penn State win the game 64–47. He took part in the Nittany Lions' first regular season contest on November 12 against Hartford, with 12 points, 6 assists, and 5 steals in spite of being given 28 minutes on the court. When asked on his communication with Frazier, Chambers said, "I'm telling him to make plays ... he has to be one of our leading scorers. He's got to look to score." In the following game, Frazier made his second career display with 20 or more points. He also matched his career-high total on assists, with 10. This was his second double-double with Penn State. Frazier also finished with 6 rebounds, 3 steals, and 1 block. Chambers said in a post-game interview, "I'm very greedy. I'm an old point guard, so I want more out of Tim Frazier, if you can imagine ... what more means is even more leadership, even better habits. We're always trying to create the best habits we can for the most difficult situation.". Frazier helped power the 62–46 victory over Radford, the team's second consecutive win in the regular season. It was also Penn State's first-round game in the Hall of Fame Tip-Off tournament. In his next game against LIU–Brooklyn, Frazier scored a career-high 26 points and matched his assists record for the second straight game, with 10. It was his second straight double-double and the third in his stint with Penn State. Chambers commented after the game, "Tim was terrific. He was a great leader tonight. He did everything you ask your point guard to do tonight." He helped the program reach a 3–0 record for the third time in 12 seasons. Following up on a loss to Kentucky, Frazier recorded 27 points on November 20, 2011, against South Florida. The next game, Frazier recorded a career-high 11 assists en route to his 4th double-double in 2011. On January 11, 2012, Frazier scored a career-high 30 points against Nebraska, with his team losing the game, 70–58. He led the Big Ten with eight 20-point games through the course of the year. By the end of the season, Frazier averaged 18.8 points, 6.2 assists, 4.7 rebounds, 2.4 steals, and 0.2 blocks. It was his highest scoring average with Penn State. He was named the John Lawther Team MVP, second-team NABC All-District, first-team All-Big Ten, Academic All-Big Ten, Basketball Times' All-District, and Big Ten All-Defensive Team.

=== Redshirt ===
Frazier began his fourth season representing Penn State with 17 points, 8 assists, and 5 rebounds in an exhibition game against Philadelphia on November 3, 2012. He sat out for much of the second half, giving his duties to D. J. Newbill. After the game, Frazier said that the team "just played Penn State basketball." On November 9, 2012, the first regular season for Frazier as a senior, he logged his 19th career 20-point game against Saint Francis (PA). On November 18, Frazier left six minutes into a game against Akron due to a ruptured left Achilles tendon. It was announced that he had a recovery period of about 12 months and would be out for the season. The injury was described as a "devastating blow" to the program by ESPN.com writer Eamonn Brennan. Chambers addressed the situation, saying, "I have no doubt he will meet this challenge and will again be one of the top players in the nation," in accordance to his potential fifth year of NCAA eligibility. Frazier redshirted the season shortly after it was announced by the school that he would undergo surgery. He said, "I will never forget that game, that injury, never forget that camera. I'm sitting there on the sideline with the (television) camera just zooming in on my foot. I'll never forget the look on my sister's face, my mom and dad's face." During his rehabilitation, Frazier began using the elliptical machine, doing work in the swimming pool, and taking part in weight training. He was guided by Penn State's athletic trainer, Jon Salazer, throughout the process. Frazier's sister Krystal had torn her right Achilles tendon when playing college basketball nearly seven years prior, and had gone through a similar rehabilitation before resuming her playing career.

=== Senior ===
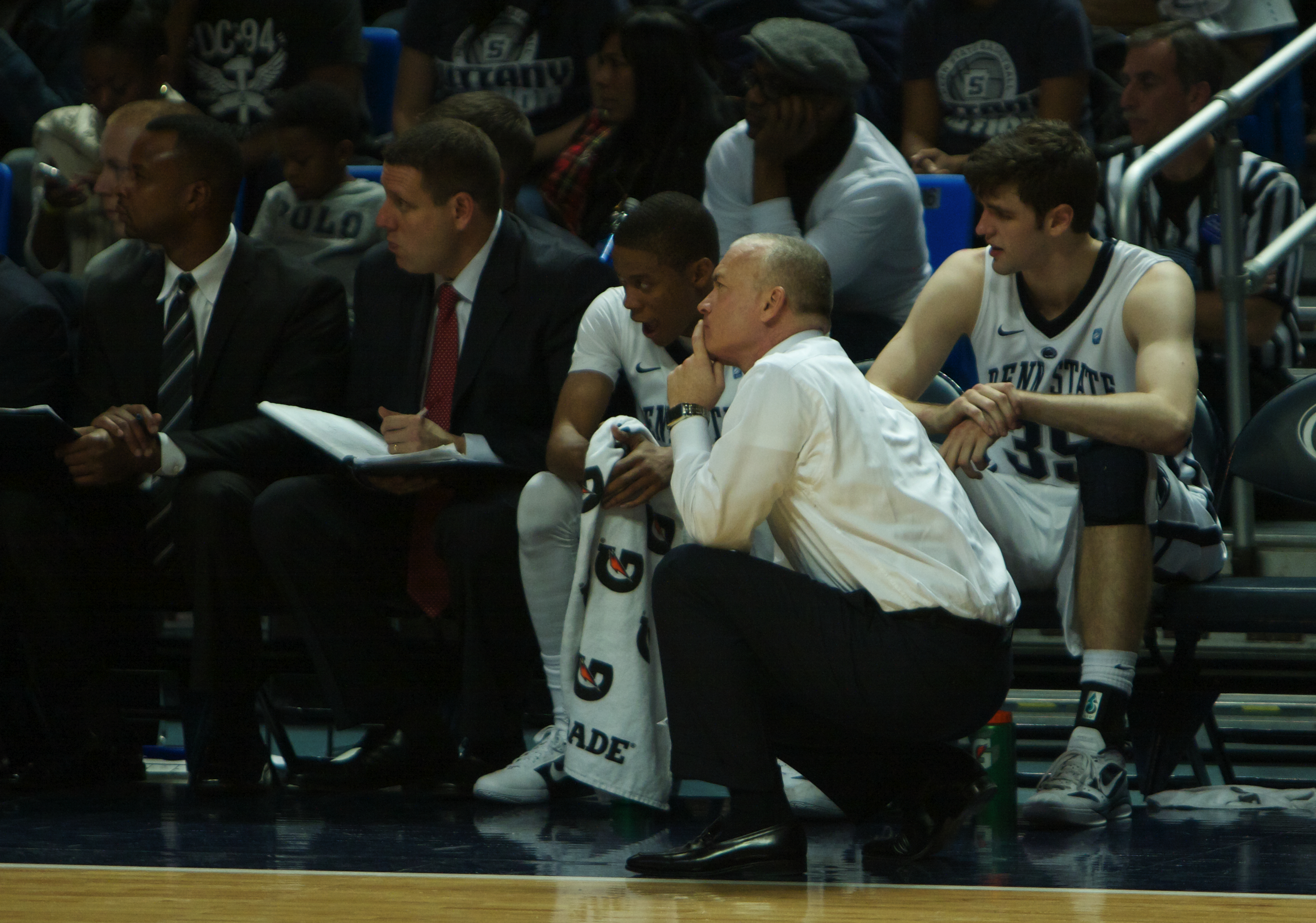
Chambers speaks to Frazier on the sidelines.

In late April, it was made official that Frazier would return to Penn State for his final year of eligibility. After the Big Ten granted him permission to partake his fifth season, Chambers said, "We are thrilled for him that he will have the opportunity to finish his career strong and again place himself among the top players in the nation." It was also announced that Frazier would pursue a second major over the summer.

On November 3, 2013, Frazier posted 11 points, 6 assists, 1 steal, and 1 block in a winning effort in an exhibition game against Northwood. In his first regular season game, he recorded a double-double against the Wagner Seahawks. It was the seventh incident in Frazier's collegiate career. He was 12-for-17 on free-throws and added 4 assists. On November 16, 2013, he scored a season-high 29 points against Pennsylvania, also recording 7 assists, 3 rebounds, and 2 steals. The duo of Frazier and D. J. Newbill was regarded as one of the nation's best backcourts, combining for 48 points through the contest. He matched his season record against St. John's on November 29, 2013, posting 29 points. Over a week later, against Duquesne, Frazier recorded a career-high 13 assists, powering a 9-point victory for Penn State. His performance tied Dan Earl for the third-most assists in one game representing the Nittany Lions. Frazier completed his final season with Penn State by averaging 14.9 points, 4.5 rebounds, 5.4 assists, 1.6 steals, and 0.2 blocks per game. He started in all 34 games, averaging 35.2 minutes. Frazier was named to the Bob Cousy Award watch list, third-team All-Big Ten, and the Barclays Center Classic all-tourney team. He was also a Senior CLASS Award finalist, and won the Big Ten Sportsmanship Award.

=== College statistics ===
College	Year	GP	GS	MPG	FG%	3P%	FT%	RPG	APG	SPG	BPG	PPG
Penn State	2009–10	31	10	18.4	.386	.375	.672	2.3	2.4	0.7	0.1	5.0
Penn State	2010–11	34	33	30.8	.430	.344	.753	3.9	5.1	1.0	0.1	6.3
Penn State	2011–12	32	31	37.1	.419	.314	.791	4.7	6.2	2.4	0.2	18.8
Penn State	2012–13	4	4	32.5	.357	.182	.846	4.5	3.8	2.3	0.3	16.3
Penn State	2013–14	34	34	35.2	.430	.291	.785	4.5	5.4	1.6	0.2	14.9

== Professional career ==
=== Maine Red Claws (2014–2015) ===
Prior to the 2014 NBA draft, Frazier worked out for several NBA teams, including the Phoenix Suns, New York Knicks, Boston Celtics, Minnesota Timberwolves, Philadelphia 76ers and Washington Wizards. Philadelphia worked him out two times, and head coach Brett Brown invited him to play for them at the 2014 Las Vegas Summer League within an hour after he was not selected in the draft. The situation was compared to that of Khalif Wyatt, who played for the 76ers through the 2013 edition of the summer league, and attended Temple University in the Philadelphia area. Frazier said, "When [the coaches] reached out to me and said they wanted me for the summer league, I was ready to go for it. I just want to go out, have fun, play my hardest and show Philly and other teams what they can get from me.". According to the 76ers assistant coach, Chad Iske, he impressed the team's staff by his "poise" and experience at the higher level. At Las Vegas, Frazier averaged 3.4 points, 4.0 rebounds, 2.0 assists and 1.2 steals in five games. On September 29, 2014, the Boston Celtics signed Frazier to a non-guaranteed training camp deal with the likely notion of auditioning with the Maine Red Claws in the future. On October 27, 2014, he was waived by the Celtics after appearing in four preseason games. As expected, four days later, he was acquired by the Maine Red Claws as an affiliate player. Frazier opened his season in the D-League by contributing 18 points, 9 assists, and 4 rebounds against the Oklahoma City Blue. He also shot 12-of-12 on free throws, helping the team win their first game.

On January 30, 2015, Frazier recorded his second triple-double of the season with 13 points, 10 rebounds and 11 assists as he helped the Red Claws snap a three-game losing streak with a 104–92 win over the Canton Charge. On February 4, 2015, he was named to the Futures All-Star team for the 2015 NBA D-League All-Star Game.

=== Philadelphia 76ers (2015) ===
On February 5, 2015, Frazier signed a 10-day contract with the Philadelphia 76ers. The following day, he made his NBA debut in the 76ers' 96–107 loss to the Boston Celtics. In just under 35 minutes of action off the bench, he recorded a game-high 11 assists to go with 5 points, 5 rebounds and 2 steals.

=== Return to Maine (2015) ===
Following the expiration of his 10-day contract, Frazier was not retained by the 76ers, and on February 16, 2015, he was reacquired by the Red Claws.

=== Return to Philadelphia (2015) ===
On February 20, 2015, Frazier signed a second 10-day contract with the 76ers. However, he was waived by the 76ers on February 24 after the team acquired Thomas Robinson.

=== Third stint with Maine (2015) ===
Frazier returned once again to Maine on February 28, 2015. On March 5, he recorded his fourth triple-double of the season with 22 points, 13 rebounds, and 14 assists in the Red Claws' 121–110 win over the Austin Spurs.

=== Portland Trail Blazers (2015–2016) ===
On March 30, 2015, Frazier signed a multi-year deal with the Portland Trail Blazers. On April 21, he was selected as both the 2015 NBA Development League's Most Valuable Player and Rookie of the Year after averaging 16.1 points, 7.1 rebounds and 9.5 assists in 41 games.

In July 2015, Frazier joined the Portland Trail Blazers for the 2015 NBA Summer League and attended training camp with the team. He made the final roster for the 2015–16 season, and played in 15 of the team's first 29 games of the season. On December 21, he started in his first game for the Trail Blazers in place of the injured Damian Lillard. He subsequently played in all but 25 seconds of the team's 106–97 loss to the Atlanta Hawks, recording 12 points, 7 rebounds, 7 assists, 2 steals and 1 block. On February 18, 2016, he was waived by the Trail Blazers.

=== Fourth stint with Maine (2016) ===
On February 27, Frazier was reacquired by the Maine Red Claws. The following day, in just his second game back for the Red Claws, Frazier recorded just the 10th triple-double in Red Claws history in a 132–111 win over the Sioux Falls Skyforce. In 32 minutes of action, he recorded 24 points, 12 rebounds, and 12 assists.

=== New Orleans Pelicans (2016–2017) ===
On March 16, 2016, Frazier signed a 10-day contract with the New Orleans Pelicans to help the team deal with numerous injuries. New Orleans had to use an NBA hardship exemption in order to sign him as he made their roster stand at 17, two over the allowed limited of 15. He made his debut for the Pelicans later that night, recording 14 points and 9 assists in 27 minutes off the bench in a 123–108 win over the Sacramento Kings. On March 20, he scored a season-high 17 points in a 109–105 win over the Los Angeles Clippers. He topped that mark four days later, scoring 18 points in a loss to the Indiana Pacers. On March 26, he signed with the Pelicans for the remainder of the season. On April 3, he had career highs with 19 points and 13 assists off the bench in a 106–87 win over the Brooklyn Nets. On April 11, he set a new career high with 20 points, along with 11 assists, in a 121–116 loss to the Chicago Bulls. In the Pelicans' season finale on April 13, Frazier had a 15-assist game off the bench in a 144–109 loss to the Minnesota Timberwolves.

On July 22, 2016, Frazier re-signed with the Pelicans. In the Pelicans' season opener on October 26, 2016, Frazier recorded 15 points and 11 assists in a 107–102 loss to the Denver Nuggets. Two days later, he scored a career-high 21 points in a 122–114 loss to the Golden State Warriors. On November 22, he had a 21-point, 14-assist effort in a 112–94 win over the Atlanta Hawks. On December 11, he had his first triple-double in the NBA with 14 points, a career-high 11 rebounds and 11 assists off the bench in a 120–119 overtime win over the Phoenix Suns.

=== Washington Wizards (2017–2018) ===
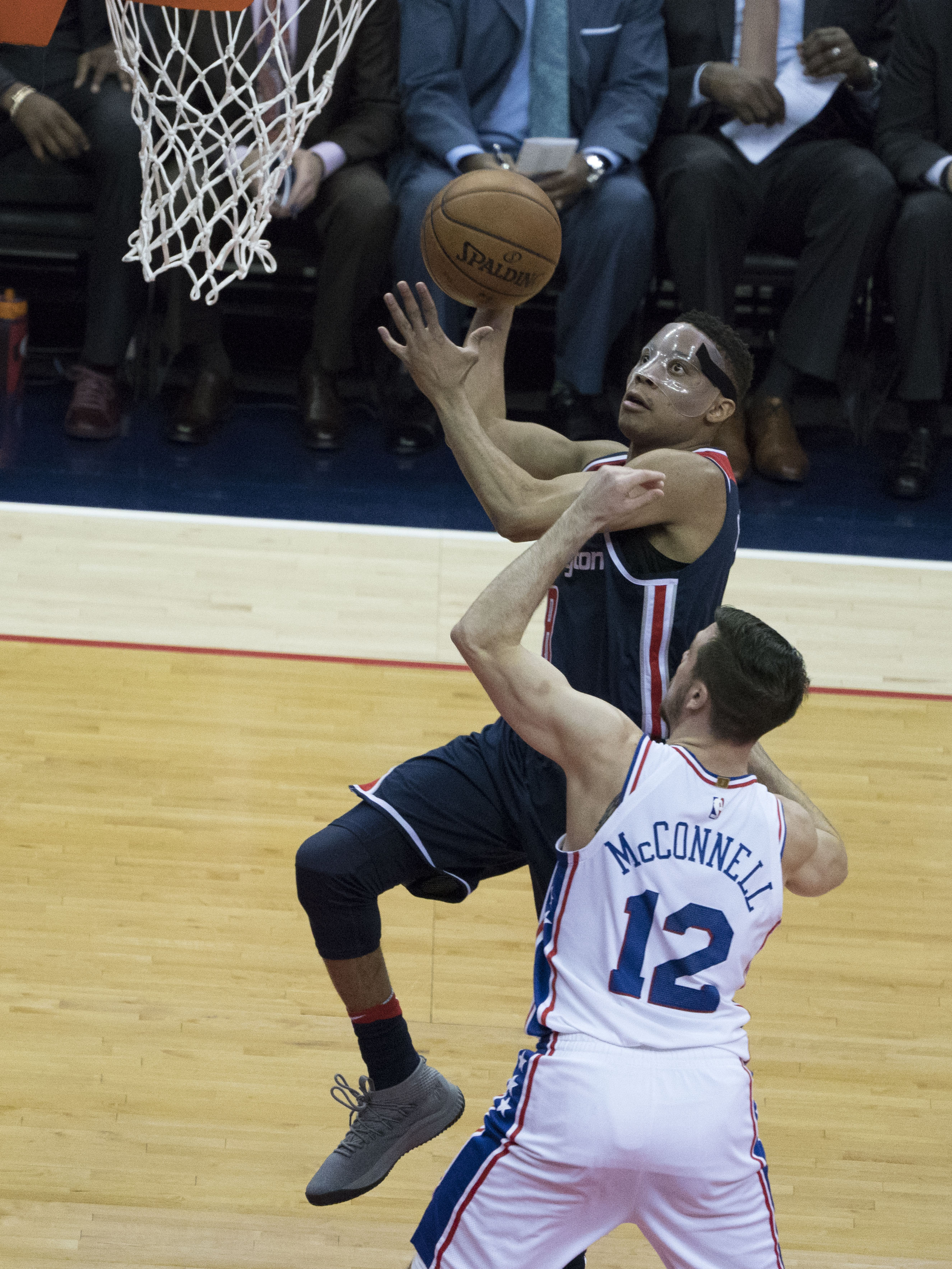
Frazier attempting a layup against T. J. McConnell in 2018

On June 21, 2017, Frazier was traded to the Washington Wizards in exchange for the 52nd overall pick in the 2017 NBA draft. On January 27, 2018, he had a season-high 14 assists in a 129–104 win over the Atlanta Hawks.

=== Return to New Orleans (2018–2019) ===
On September 22, 2018, Frazier signed with the Milwaukee Bucks for training camp. He was waived by the Bucks on October 15. Two days later, he was claimed off waivers by the New Orleans Pelicans. On February 28, 2019, he was waived by the Pelicans.

=== Milwaukee Bucks (2019) ===
On March 19, 2019, Frazier signed with the Milwaukee Bucks. On April 10, 2019, he scored a career-high 29 points to go with 13 assists in a 127–116 loss to the Oklahoma City Thunder.

=== Detroit Pistons (2019–2020) ===
On July 6, 2019, Frazier signed with the Detroit Pistons. On February 6, 2020, he was waived.

=== Memphis Grizzlies (2021) ===
On January 4, 2021, Frazier signed a 10-day contract with the Memphis Grizzlies, making three appearances. On April 14, he signed a second 10-day contract, and on April 24, he signed for the rest of the season.

=== Orlando Magic (2021–2022) ===
On December 21, 2021, Frazier signed a 10-day contract with the Orlando Magic. He signed a second 10-day contract with the team on December 31.

=== Cleveland Cavaliers (2022) ===
On February 25, 2022, Frazier signed a 10-day contract with the Cleveland Cavaliers.

=== AEK Athens (2022–2023) ===
On August 24, 2022, Frazier signed his first-ever contract overseas with the Greek club AEK Athens.

=== SIG Strasbourg (2023) ===
On February 21, 2023, Frazier signed a contract with the French club SIG Strasbourg.

=== Promitheas Patras (2023) ===
On December 11, 2023, Frazier returned to Greece for Promitheas Patras. Only twelve days later, he mutually parted ways with the club due to a family matter overseas.

== NBA career statistics ==
Legend
GP	Games played	GS	Games started	MPG	Minutes per game
FG%	Field goal percentage	3P%	3-point field goal percentage	FT%	Free throw percentage
RPG	Rebounds per game	APG	Assists per game	SPG	Steals per game
BPG	Blocks per game	PPG	Points per game	**Bold**	Career high

=== Regular season ===
Year	Team	GP	GS	MPG	FG%	3P%	FT%	RPG	APG	SPG	BPG	PPG
2014–15	Philadelphia	6	3	28.5	.302	.273	.333	3.2	7.2	1.0	.0	5.7
2014–15	Portland	5	0	13.6	.444	.333	**.833**	1.8	3.4	.4	.0	4.6
2015–16	Portland	35	1	7.8	.333	.176	.533	1.1	1.2	.3	.0	1.5
2015–16	New Orleans	16	1	**29.3**	.450	**.419**	.763	**4.4**	**7.5**	**1.4**	.1	**13.1**
2016–17	New Orleans	**65**	**35**	23.5	.403	.313	.760	2.7	5.2	.9	.1	7.1
2017–18	Washington	59	11	14.2	.395	.304	.767	1.9	3.3	.8	.1	3.0
2018–19	New Orleans	47	17	19.3	**.451**	.351	.780	2.9	4.4	.5	.1	5.0
2018–19	Milwaukee	12	2	17.6	.424	.417	.692	2.6	3.5	.4	.1	6.3
2019–20	Detroit	27	11	13.1	.362	.333	.792	1.2	3.4	.5	.1	3.6
2020–21	Memphis	5	0	12.4	.150	.000	.333	1.6	3.2	.4	**.2**	1.6
2021–22	Orlando	10	3	20.0	.302	.353	.556	1.9	3.3	.3	.1	3.7
2021–22	Cleveland	2	0	4.0	.500	—	—	.0	.5	.0	.0	1.0
Career		289	84	17.6	.400	.323	.723	2.3	4.0	.7	.1	4.9

=== Playoffs ===
Year	Team	GP	GS	MPG	FG%	3P%	FT%	RPG	APG	SPG	BPG	PPG
2015	Portland	2	0	1.5	.000	—	—	.0	.0	.0	.0	.0
2018	Washington	2	0	3.0	.000	—	—	.5	**1.5**	**.5**	.0	.0
2019	Milwaukee	**11**	0	**3.6**	**.615**	**.500**	**1.000**	**.8**	.9	.1	.0	**1.9**
Career		15	0	3.3	.533	.500	1.000	.7	.9	.1	.0	1.4

== Personal life ==
Tim Frazier graduated in May 2013 with a 3.1 grade point average in supply chain and information systems at Smeal College of Business. Frazier added a second bachelor's degree in communication arts and sciences the following year. He later served as the basketball team's representative to the Penn State Student Athlete Advisory Board and was a member of the secret society Parmi Nous while at Penn State. In March 2023, Frazier had his first child.
