= Pace Murphy =

American football player (born 1994)

No. 72
- Position: Offensive tackle

Personal information
- Born: March 2, 1994 (age 32); Houston, Texas, U.S.
- Listed height: 6 ft 6 in (1.98 m)
- Listed weight: 308 lb (140 kg)

Career information
- High school: Strake Jesuit College Preparatory (Houston, Texas)
- College: Northwestern State (2012–2015)
- NFL draft: 2016: undrafted

Career history
- Los Angeles Rams (2016); San Francisco 49ers (2017–2018)*; Kansas City Chiefs (2018–2019)*; Dallas Renegades (2020); Dallas Cowboys (2020)*
- * Offseason or practice squad member only

Career NFL statistics
- Games played: 2
- Games started: 0
- Stats at Pro Football Reference

Pace Murphy (born March 2, 1994) is an American former professional football player who was an offensive tackle for the Los Angeles Rams of the National Football League (NFL). He played college football for the Northwestern State Demons. He signed with the Rams as an undrafted free agent in 2016.

== Professional career ==
=== Los Angeles Rams ===
On May 4, 2016, Murphy signed with the Los Angeles Rams as an undrafted free agent.

On September 2, 2017, Murphy was waived by the Rams.

=== San Francisco 49ers ===
On September 18, 2017, Murphy was signed to the San Francisco 49ers' practice squad. He signed a reserve/future contract with the 49ers on January 2, 2018. He was waived on August 31, 2018.

=== Kansas City Chiefs ===
On October 23, 2018, Murphy was signed to the Kansas City Chiefs practice squad. He signed a reserve/future contract with the Chiefs on January 23, 2019.

On August 31, 2019, Murphy was waived by the Chiefs.

=== Dallas Renegades ===
Murphy was selected in the 2nd round in phase two in the 2020 XFL draft by the Dallas Renegades. He had his contract terminated when the league suspended operations on April 10, 2020.

=== Dallas Cowboys ===
Murphy signed with the Dallas Cowboys on August 18, 2020. He was waived on September 2, 2020.
