= Nicolas Jean-Baptiste =

American football player and coach (born 1989)

Montana State Bobcats
- Title: Defensive tackles coach, assistant defensive line coach

Personal information
- Born: March 8, 1989 (age 37); Fairfax, Virginia, U.S.
- Listed height: 6 ft 1 in (1.85 m)
- Listed weight: 330 lb (150 kg)

Career information
- Position: Nose tackle (No. 95)
- High school: Strake Jesuit (Houston, Texas)
- College: Baylor
- NFL draft: 2012: undrafted

Career history

Playing
- Baltimore Ravens (2012)*; Indianapolis Colts (2012)*; Cleveland Browns (2013)*; Arizona Rattlers (2014); Jacksonville Sharks (2015)
- * Offseason or practice squad member only

Coaching
- South Dakota Mines (2015) Defensive line coach; Baylor (2016) Graduate assistant; South Dakota Mines (2017) Defensive line coach; Navarro (2018–2019) Defensive line coach; Cleveland HS (TX) (2020–2021) Defensive line coach; Montana State (2022–present) Defensive tackles coach & assistant defensive line coach

Awards and highlights
- ArenaBowl champion (2014); Second-team All-Big 12 (2011)

Career AFL statistics
- Tackles: 16.5
- Sacks: 4.5
- Forced fumbles: 3
- Stats at ArenaFan.com

Nicolas Jean-Baptiste (born March 8, 1989) is an American former professional football nose tackle. He was signed by the Baltimore Ravens as an undrafted free agent in 2012. He played college football at Baylor.

== Early life ==
Jean-Baptiste attended Strake Jesuit College Preparatory. He earned 2006 first-team All-District 17-5A honors on offense as an Offensive guard and defense as a Defensive end.

== College career ==
Jean-Baptiste played at Baylor University. He participated in the 2012 East West Shrine Game. He played 49 games and started 21 games at Nose tackle. He recorded 94 tackles, 5 sacks and a Forced fumble. In 2011 his senior year, Jean-Baptiste recorded a career high 4 sacks along with 36 tackles.

In his junior year, Jean-Baptiste played 12 games and he recorded 31 tackles, half sack. On September 2, 2011, in the season opener against TCU, Jean-Baptiste had four tackles, one tackle was for a loss of gain, a pass deflection and a blocked kick in which Baylor won 50-48 after blowing a 24-point lead. During his junior season, Jean-Baptiste was named the starter in the fourth game of the year against Rice. But Jean-Baptiste had just one tackle as Baylor won 30-13.

In his sophomore year, Jean-Baptiste played 12 games coming off the bench. He had 18 tackles and a half sack. In a game against Northwestern State, he recorded a season high 4 tackles, including one for an assisted loss of gain while Baylor won 68-13.

In his redshirt freshman year, Jean-Baptiste played in 12 games and only had 9 tackles. On December 7, 2011, Jean-Baptiste was named to the Second-team All-Big 12.

== Professional career ==
=== Baltimore Ravens ===
After going undrafted in the 2012 NFL draft, Jean-Baptiste signed with the Baltimore Ravens' practice team. On August 31, he was released.

=== Indianapolis Colts ===
Jean-Baptiste was signed by the Indianapolis Colts to their practice squad on September 18, 2012. On October 3, 2012, he was released from the practice squad.

=== Cleveland Browns ===
He signed with the Cleveland Browns on May 13, 2013. On August 26, he was released.

=== Arizona Rattlers ===
Jean-Baptiste was assigned to the Arizona Rattlers of the Arena Football League on December 10, 2013.

=== Jacksonville Sharks ===
On March 19, 2015, Jean-Baptiste was traded to the Jacksonville Sharks for Chase Deadder.

== Coaching career ==
In 2015, Jean-Baptiste was hired as the defensive line coach for South Dakota Mines.

In 2016, Jean-Baptiste joined Baylor as a graduate assistant.

In 2017, Jean-Baptiste was rehired as the defensive line coach for South Dakota Mines.

In 2018, Jean-Baptiste was hired as the defensive line coach for Navarro College.

In 2020, Jean-Baptiste was hired as the defensive line coach for Cleveland High School.

In 2022, Jean-Baptiste was hired as the defensive tackles coach and assistant defensive line coach for Montana State.
