= WCBZ-LP =

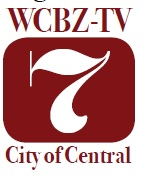

Central City–Baton Rouge, Louisiana; United States
- Channels: Analog: 7 (VHF)

Ownership
- Owner: Louisiana Christian Broadcasting, Inc.

History
- First air date: August 28, 1989
- Last air date: October 20, 2010
- Former call signs: W13CG (1989–1991); DW13CG (1991–1995); W13CG (1995–1996); K07WE (1996–2008)
- Former channel number: 13 (1989–1996)
- Former affiliations: The Box (1989–2001); MTV2 (2001–2006)
- Call sign meaning: Central Baker Zachary

Technical information
- Facility ID: 24980
- Class: TX
- ERP: 3 kW
- Transmitter coordinates: 30°30′21.3″N 91°1′24.2″W

WCBZ-LP was a low-power television station in Central City, Louisiana, broadcasting locally on VHF channel 7 as an affiliate of My Family TV. The station was affiliated with Central's local newspaper, the Central City News. The station is managed by former state senator Woody Jenkins, who once owned and managed WBTR and features programming local to the Central area, such as news coverage, local sports, and council and school board meetings. The station conducted a "test broadcast" on November 13, 2008. Unlike many television stations, WCBZ was still broadcasting in analog, as it was exempt from the 2009 "Big Switch."

WCBZ went silent on October 20, 2010. On December 19, 2011, the Federal Communications Commission suspended the station's license and deleted the WCBZ-LP call sign from its database.
