= LU 78 Canal 7 Islas Malvinas =

Short-lived television station during the Falklands War in Port Stanley, Argentina

LU 78 Canal 7 Islas Malvinas was an Argentine television station which was operational in 1982 from Port Stanley, at the time Puerto Argentino, during the Falklands War. It operated as both a station and a relayer of Argentina Televisora Color (ATC). It was the first local television station in the islands.

== History ==
The first television broadcasts in the Falkland Islands took place on 13 April 1982 at 7pm. These were done every evening from 7 to 9pm, in both Spanish and English languages. The English announcements were done by LRA Radio Nacional presenter Norman Powell, who was bilingual. In addition to programming relayed from Buenos Aires, local broadcasts served to carry news, services and music: both classical music and Argentine folklore.

Technical responsibility was under technician Fernando Monetti and technical operator Eduardo Oderigo. The 100-watt transmitter was offered by Canal 12 of Posadas, Misiones, along with technical personnel while Canal 7 (ATC) administered the U-Matic tape machine, TBC and technical instruments alongside ATC's programming provided from its facilities in Buenos Aires.

Since there were no television sets in the Falkland Islands, INCOTEL installed 40 television sets for locals, from Philips, Dumont, Admiral and Zenith at the price of £100 to buy in ten quotas, the first of which worth £20 and the other nine £10/month. Everto Hugo Caballero (in charge of the radiotelephony system) and Ernesto Dalmau (in charge of LRA60) visited households of inhabitants and installed the sets. They were all sold until 11 May. At the end of the war, the islanders had paid £30.

ATC even designed an exclusive logo for usage on the station.

ATC's newscast 60 minutos reported from the islands throughout the war. Nicolás Kasanzew was its only journalist present throughout its entirety.

After the end of the war, television was restored under the control of the British Forces Broadcasting Service, whose local television station began on 4 December 1986.
