= Channel 7 TV stations in Mexico =

The following television stations broadcast on digital channel 7 in Mexico:

- XHFGL-TDT in Durango, Durango
- XHTUG-TDT in Tuxtla Gutiérrez, Chiapas
