= Channel 7 TV stations in Canada =

List of television stations that broadcast on channel 7 in Canada

The following television stations broadcast on digital or analog channel 7 in Canada:

- CFCN-TV-2 in Banff, Alberta
- CFJC-TV-11 in Quesnel, British Columbia
- CFTF-DT-7 in Sept-Îles, Quebec
- CHAU-DT-6 in Gaspé, Quebec
- CHLT-DT in Sherbrooke, Quebec
- CIII-DT-7 in Midland, Ontario
- CISA-DT in Lethbridge, Alberta
- CKY-DT in Winnipeg, Manitoba

== Defunct ==
- CFRN-TV-7 in Lougheed, Alberta
- CHAN-TV-3 in Squamish, British Columbia
- CHBC-TV-7 in Penticton, British Columbia
- CHBX-TV-1 in Wawa, Ontario
- CHKL-TV-3 in Revelstoke, British Columbia
- CIPA-TV-2 in Big River, Saskatchewan
- CISR-TV-1 in Grand Forks, British Columbia
- CJCB-TV-5 in Bay St. Lawrence, Nova Scotia
- CJDG-DT in Val d'Or, Quebec
- CKCD-TV in Campbellton, New Brunswick
- CKCK-TV-7 in Fort Qu'Appelle, Saskatchewan
- CKLT-TV-2 in Boiestown, New Brunswick
- CKMJ-TV in Moose Jaw, Saskatchewan
- CKRT-DT in Rivière-du-Loup, Quebec
