= Lala (music service) =

Online music store

Lala.com
- Website type: Online music distribution
- Dissolved: May 31, 2010
- Headquarters: Palo Alto, California, US
- Owner: Apple
- Creator: Bill Nguyen
- Website: http://www.lala.com
- Commercial: Yes
- Registration: No longer accepted
- Launched: March 6, 2006

Lala was an online music store created by Silicon Valley entrepreneur Bill Nguyen. The service allowed members to legally create online shareable "playlists" (formerly known as "radio stations") of their own uploaded music which could play full length songs for other registered Lala members, purchase MP3s, stream music on a one-time basis or as inexpensively purchased "web songs," buy new CDs from the Lala store, leave blurbs on other members' pages, and participate in the community forums. Lala contracted with major labels and offered a large catalog of albums to stream or purchase. Their home page claimed over 8 million licensed songs available.

Apple acquired Lala on December 4, 2009. On April 30, 2010, Lala announced it would be shutting down its service on May 31, 2010. They also announced they were "no longer accepting new users" and that users with credit would receive credit in Apple's iTunes Store instead.

Lala shut down as scheduled on May 31, 2010. However, it still served for a while as the music engine for Billboard.com, providing full-length previews of songs on the Top 100 chart. After that, Billboard.com used MySpace Music as its provider.

== History ==
La La media, Inc. was based in Palo Alto, California and was venture funded by Bain Capital and Ignition Partners, as well as a recent $20 million investment by Warner Music Group Corp. It was founded by serial entrepreneur Bill Nguyen, along with Billy Alvarado, Anselm Baird-Smith, and John Cogan III.

Initially the business focused on CD trading, allowing users to send CDs to other members. Lala kept track of the trades, so that each user could expect to get as many CDs from others as they had sent out themselves. The site launched in an invite-only beta phase on March 6, 2006. It officially launched in open-beta on June 8, 2006. By December 2006, there were around 300,000 members registered on Lala and over 500,000 CDs traded since the company's launch. The company had a staff of 23 people.

In 2007, La La media, Inc. introduced Lala 2.0, which moved the website's focus from trading used CDs to uploading MP3s and listening to free, legal, on-demand streaming of full length songs and albums. The listening feature was quietly discontinued a few weeks later without explanation to the site's user base.

The next version of the site, referred to as Lala 3.0, transitioned from closed beta testing to a general site rollout in open-beta mode in June 2008. The site was openly divided between trading members and non-trading members with different access to certain site features. Registered Lala members could stream songs or albums in their entirety once at no cost. Individual tracks could be purchased in MP3 format for 89 cents, or, for ten cents, members could purchase the right to stream a song from the website as many times as desired (referred to as a "web song"). All members could also upload their MP3 song libraries for personal web access from any computer.

In December 2009, Lala made the decision to close their trading service.

Lala.com was purchased by Apple on December 4, 2009.

On April 30, 2010, Apple announced that it would be shutting down Lala.com entirely on May 31, 2010.

== Original business model ==
The provided sleeve used to send traded CDs to recipients

The original primary function of the website was brokering trades of CDs between users. After a few years, the company shifted its main focus to uploading MP3s, listening, and buying instead of trading.

For the trading function, Lala made money by charging a fee for each disc a trading member receives (this fee was $1 per disc since the website's inception). Upon signing up for the trading service, a user would provide a credit card number which was used for subsequent monthly billings. New traders received a packet of prepaid shipping envelopes and protective cardboard sleeves; new envelopes were provided as required while the user was expected to re-use the disc sleeves from discs they received.

Limits were placed on the number of discs a trader could have in transit in either direction at a given time. This protected not only Lala.com, but the recipients and shippers as well.

The website had a "buy new" feature which allows users to purchase new CDs directly from the Lala store at low prices (often at wholesale) through a partnership with retailer Newbury Comics.

Lala.com also had a gift feature through which people were able to purchase CDs for other members directly from those members' want lists. The recipient was sent an email letting them know that a gift had been purchased for them, and the CD was automatically added to the recipient's Have list.

=== Shipping costs ===
Unlike other sites which facilitate direct sales between users (such as Half.com), Lala.com paid shipping costs, which were recovered as an additional fee to the trade brokerage fee.

As the site initially launched, members used envelopes pre-stamped with traditional postage (a $0.65 postage stamp) and a $0.49 shipping charge was added for each received disc. In addition to the gap between the actual cost of envelopes and postage and the fee charged, this approach represented a significant potential for lost revenue, as members in possession of these envelopes might not use them or could misplace them, with the postage having already been spent. Another drawback to this system was that members often had to add postage if they were including CD cover art along with the CD they were sending.

Starting in July 2006 (August 2006 for existing members), Lala.com revised its shipping guidelines and began charging $0.75 per trade for shipping in addition to the $1 fee. The envelopes were charged postage only when mailed, similar in design to Business Reply envelopes. The new shipping rate also allowed for members to send CD artwork without worrying about having sufficient postage.

=== Legal issues ===
Lala.com's terms and conditions included a provision warning the user that it was illegal to retain MP3 files of a CD once it had been traded. If a user no longer owned the CD, he or she no longer had rights to derivatives of the CD.

In April, 2006, Omnilala owned trademark protection for its mark "LALA" for use in music-streaming services and web-based entertainment. La La Media filed a lawsuit to cancel Omnilala's "LALA" trademark (see Trademark Trial and Appeal Board Cancellation No. 92048521). The suit was being successfully defended before the Board, but Omnilala decided to let go of its mark in return for a $90,000 payment.

In late May 2008, Lala.com blocked international users from accessing their already purchased content. Refunds were issued when requested. However, users from other countries could still access their songs if they used an American-based web proxy.

== Lala.com and WOXY.com ==
Nguyen and his website were highlighted in the news in October 2006, when Nguyen announced his investment in Internet-based Cincinnati, Ohio radio station WOXY.com.

The investment allowed WOXY.com to go back on the air after a brief suspension of broadcasting. Both sites cross-promote the other; Lala.com promotes the station, and WOXY advertises music that is for sale (or trade) produced by some of the independent artists that WOXY features. In February 2009, LaLa sold Woxy.com to Future Sounds, Inc., an organization that aired programming on WOXY.com.
