= Tele 7 =

Defunct Panamanian television channel

- Country: Panama
- Broadcast area: Panama City, Panama

Programming
- Language: Spanish

Ownership
- Owner: Corporación Medcom
- Sister channels: RPC Televisión, Telemetro

History
- Launched: 7 May 2005
- Closed: 31 July 2011
- Replaced by: Mall TV

Availability

Terrestrial
- VHF: 7
- DVB-T: 43

Tele 7 was a Panamanian over-the-air television channel that existed between 2005 and 2011 and was owned by Corporación Medcom. The channel was aimed largely at children and teenagers throughout its six years on air.

== History ==
The Panamanian government, after unsuccessfully auctioning off the former SCN frequency to create a local channel for the Panama Canal Zone, led to the reconsidering of the decision, and instead opted to bid for two adjacent frequencies in Panama City. The two media giants, TVN and MEDCOM, both applied for a license; TVN obtained TVMax on channel 9 and MEDCOM, Tele 7. The station, however, had to face interference of an FETV relay station targeting Coclé and Herrera, a situation which wasn't solved until 2008. The channel's mascot was a tiger, Eddie El Tigrillo. For Nicolás A. Barletta, the goal of the channel was to complement the other segments of the population covered by MEDCOM's other channels.

The channel was publicly announced in March 2005, with Medcom announcing a wide raft of foreign acquisitions (dubbed originals of the American networks and supplied third-party series, as originally seen on the Latin American feeds of Cartoon Network, Nickelodeon and Discovery Kids) and a handful of local content. It also planned its first Festival de Talento Infantil in June. The channel went live on May 7 and during its first few days on air, achieved successful ratings, ending in third or fourth place, depending on the day. It also had a strategic alliance with Nickelodeon at launch to air a two-hour block of its programming. 80% of its programming was imported and about ten hours a day were given to children's programming. Notable programming at the time of launch included ¡Mucha Lucha!, The Adventures of Jimmy Neutron, Boy Genius, The Powerpuff Girls, Codename: Kids Next Door, Poochini, 31 Minutos and more mature programming such as Joan of Arcadia and The Simpsons. By October 2005 it was carrying the Mexican telenovela Rebelde and joined Teletón Panamá for the first time in December that year. In November it premiered Family Guy.

In January 2006, the channel started airing classic animated series: Maya the Honey Bee, Heidi, Girl of the Alps, 3000 Leagues in Search of Mother and The Yogi Bear Show, as well as The Little Lulu Show. On March 11, the channel started airing a new local program, TVscopio; one of its segments included a local animated series, Los súper birriosos. In April, the channel changed the airtime of Pablo y Andrea to 12pm, using the vacated slot to carry Flipper. In anticipation for the 2006 FIFA World Cup, the channel started airing the Mexican-produced Poncho Balón shorts, from May 8 to June 9. In July, the channel premiered Go, Diego, Go! and Coconut Fred's Fruit Salad Island. On September 11, it started airing the Spanish-made Vitaminix shorts, airing until the end of the year. On September 18, it was one of the six channels that broadcast the Solo en la Tele (Only on TV) campaign about the benefits of advertising on television. The channel teamed up with Asociación Panameña de Ayuda al Niño Quemado (Apaniquem) in October to launch a campaign promoting the lowering of child burn, with PSAs appearing throughout the day. In November, the channel premiered the 2006 version of Chiquititas, Chiquititas sin fin. Tele 7 was one of the six channels (out of ten) taking part in the coverage of Teletón 2006.

For the back to school season in early 2007, Tele 7 took part in a company-wide television campaign on the importance of going to school, aimed at kids and parents. It was also announced that the channel would be made available in Chiriquí Province starting in May. In October 2008, the government notified MEDCOM to reduce the coverage area of the channel in the districts of Chame and San Carlos.

January 2009 saw the premiere of the Argentine series Patito feo on the channel. In June 2009 the channel premiered Tiempo estudiantil, a 20-episode series on problems the youth faced at the time, using two local bands as basis, in the same year their premiered the argentinian live action series from Strawberry Shortcake (TV series) named Frutillita y sus amigos

On July 13, 2011, it was announced that Tele 7 would shut down and would be replaced from August 1 by Mall TV, a channel that already existed on cable. The mascot, a tiger called Eddie, now appeared on Telemetro from July 18. The primary cause of its closure was due to coverage and MEDCOM's inability to expand the signal to a national scale, as the over-the-air signal of Tele 7 in its lifespan never reached the central provinces, Colón and Darién.

== Programming ==
Partial list of programs that aired throughout its history.

=== Preschool ===
- Barney the Dinosaur (HIT Entertainment)
- Bob the Builder (HIT Entertainment)
- Madeline (DIC-Cinar/Cookie Jar)
- Boo! (Tell-Tale)
- Ethelbert the Tiger
- Maisy
- Jakers! The Adventures of Piggley Winks (Entara)
- Hello Kitty's Paradise

=== Licensed animated series from Cartoon Network, Disney Channel and Nickelodeon ===
Cartoon Network:

- The Powerpuff Girls
- Codename: Kids Next Door

Nickelodeon:

- The Adventures of Jimmy Neutron, Boy Genius
- Danny Phantom
- All Grown Up!
- Rugrats

=== Other licensed animated series ===
- Toad Patrol
- Gadget Boy (DIC)
- Sabrina: The Animated Series (DIC)
- Tiny Toon Adventures (Warner Bros. Animation)
- Animaniacs (Warner Bros. Animation)
- The Jetsons (Hanna-Barbera via WBA)
- Tom and Jerry (Hanna-Barbera via WBA)
- Several Scooby-Doo series (Hanna-Barbera, later WBA)
- The Pink Panther
- Betty Toons (RCN Televisión)
- ¡Mucha Lucha! (Warner Bros. Animation)
- Sabrina's Secret Life (DIC)
- Super Duper Sumos
- What's New, Scooby-Doo? (Warner Bros. Animation)

=== Animes ===
- Go! Go! Itsutsugo Land

=== Live-action series (excluding telenovelas) ===
- 31 Minutos (Aplaplac)
- El Chavo del Ocho (Televisa)
- El Chapulín Colorado (Televisa)
- Mi familia es un dibujo (Patagonik-Telefe)
- Planet's Funniest Animals
- Drake & Josh (Nickelodeon)
- That's So Raven (Disney Channel)
- Joan of Arcadia (Sony Pictures Television)
- Sue Thomas: F.B.Eye (Paxson Entertainment

=== Telenovelas ===
- Amy, la niña de la mochila azul (Televisa, 2005)
- Corazones al límite (Televisa, 2005)
- Rebelde (Televisa, October 10, 2005-2006)

=== Local content ===
- Mini TV (2005)
