= Color Labs =

- Type: Private
- Headquarters: Palo Alto, California
- Key people: Bill Nguyen; Geoff Ralston; Douglas Leone
- Website: color.com (Taken over)

Color
- Developers: Color Labs, Inc.
- Release: March 24, 2011; 15 years ago
- Operating system: iOS 4.2 or later
- Size: 7.7 MB
- Available in: English
- Type: Social networking software
- License: Freeware
- Website: color.com (Taken over)

Color Labs, Inc. was a start-up based in Palo Alto, California, US. Its main product was the eponymous mobile app for sharing photos through social networking. It allowed people to take photos in addition to viewing other photos also taken in the vicinity. The application grouped photos based on a user's friends, so that the user is more likely to see the more relevant photos.

Following skepticism and rumors from Silicon Valley commentators, Color Labs stopped selling the app at the end of 2012.

== Launch ==
The group started when co-founders Bill Nguyen and Peter Pham received $41 million in funding. Color was named as a tribute to Apple's color logo from the Apple II. Nguyen described the Apple II as having changed his life when he was seven. The domain name Color.com was bought in December 2010 for $350,000.

In 2010–2011, Color closed $25 million in funding from Sequoia Capital, $9 million from Bain Capital, and $7 million in venture debt from Silicon Valley Bank. In September 2011, Douglas Leone revealed that Sequoia Capital only invested three days before the scheduled launch of Color.

On March 24, 2011, Color launched its eponymous mobile app in iOS App Store. A week after the launch, Color Labs released an update with significant changes to the iOS App interface—allowing users to see photos from events "Nearby", a "Feed" of relevant photos, and a "History" of groups that users can participate in. Words underneath each icon explaining what they did were also added.

In July 2011, it was reported that Google offered to buy Color for $200 million before their first launch, but Color Labs turned down the deal.

== Controversy and demise ==
When it launched, the application had around 1 million downloads. By September 2011, the service had a little under 100,000 active users. In June 2011, less than three months after the company officially launched, Pham left Color, followed quickly by Chief Product Officer DJ Patil.

In the weeks following Color's initial launch, controversy surrounded the startup's $41 million funding and mixed reviews on the product. The initial launch confused users with the application's interface and purpose. Its initial rating in the App Store was 2 out of 5 stars. In an interview with Robert Scoble in April 2011, Pham and Nguyen admitted that Color's launch was a wasted opportunity, sharing: "We threw out a network you don’t know how to get good at…We threw a mountain at people."

In October 2012, media reports indicated that Color's board of directors had voted to shut down the company. Other sources denied that the company was shutting down but suggested that it was possibly preparing to be acquired by another company or for another major transformative event. Reports included that the staff would be sold to Apple for $2 to $7 million. In November, Color Labs announced that the app would be shut down at the end of 2012.
