= K07UF =

TV station in Abilene, Texas

Abilene, Texas; United States
- Channels: Analog: 7 (VHF)
- Branding: KUF

Programming
- Affiliations: The Learning Channel (1988–1990, 1995–2003); Mind Extension University (1990–1995); Annenberg Channel (2003–2008)

Ownership
- Owner: Abilene Christian University

History
- Founded: 1987
- First air date: October 29, 1988
- Last air date: June 12, 2015 (license canceled)

Technical information
- Licensing authority: FCC
- Facility ID: 298
- Class: Class A
- ERP: 0.082 kW
- HAAT: 67 m (220 ft)
- Transmitter coordinates: 32°28′34″N 99°42′22″W

Links
- Public license information: Public file; LMS

K07UF (channel 7), commonly called "KUF", was a low-power television station in Abilene, Texas, United States. The station was owned by Abilene Christian University and broadcast from 1988 to about 2012. Its programming primarily consisted of national educational programming, provided for much of its history by The Learning Channel, as well as local productions from studios on the Abilene Christian campus. On the local cable system, its channel was also used for local educational programming.

== History ==
In 1987, Abilene Christian University applied with the Federal Communications Commission (FCC) for a low-power TV station on one of three channels: 7, 51, or 64. All three applications were approved, but the university selected channel 7 in the VHF band for cost reasons. K07UF went on the air on October 29, 1988, during Abilene Christian's homecoming weekend. It aired local productions as well as programming from The Learning Channel (TLC), then an adult education service.

In 1990, KUF switched from TLC to the Mind Extension University service, but it changed back to using TLC programming in 1995. On Abilene's cable system, the station shared a channel slot with programming produced by the Abilene Independent School District, which was not broadcast over-the-air.

KUF also aired local programming from its studios, located in the first floor of the Don Morris Center.

The signal was strengthened to 1,000 watts in 2000. Three years later, TLC discontinued its relationships with low-power TV stations such as K07UF; channel 7 began going by "KXN" and began using Annenberg/CPB Channel programming. The Annenberg Channel closed in October 2008; by 2012, the station was reported to be running the city's government access channel, Abilene Television Network (ATN). At that time, the FCC began requesting public file information and children's programming reports from K07UF; the station had been upgraded to Class A classification in 2001 but never filed concomitant reports with the commission.

The station's license was canceled by the FCC on June 12, 2015, for failure to file a renewal application.
