= TV7 (Lithuania) =

- Country: Lithuania
- Broadcast area: Jonava

Programming
- Language: Lithuanian

Ownership
- Owner: UAB "TV7"

History
- Launched: 2001
- Closed: December 2025

Availability

Terrestrial
- Digital: Channel 40

TV7 was a regional television channel licensed to the city of Jonava, Lithuania. It was established in 2001 and carried programming from Ren TV and Init TV. It closed in 2025.

== History ==
The channel was founded in 2001 as Jonavos Televizija, headed by Loreta Macionienė. She was the director and the only shareholder throughout the channel's history. On October 18, 2006, it was renamed TV7. A proposal to sell 40% of the shares to non-commercial and experimental interests in 2012 was rejected.

TV7 was available on the Init cable platform. Programming consisted mostly of local shows, as well as foreign feature films in the evening and relays of Ukrainian channel FreeDOM in the morning.
