= Canal 7 UCV TV =

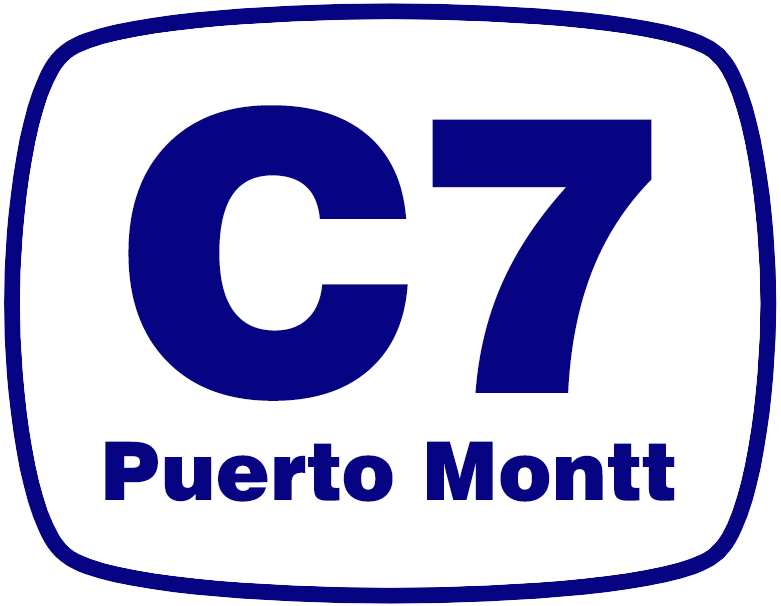
- Logo before the frequency change
- Puerto Montt; Chile
- Channels: Analog: 8 (VHF)

Ownership
- Owner: Universidad Católica de Valparaíso

History
- First air date: January 2, 1990
- Last air date: February 12, 2002
- Former channel numbers: 9 (VHF, 1990–1998)

Technical information
- Repeater: 12 (Andacollo)

Canal 7 UCV Televisión was a Chilean over-the-air regional television station, based in Puerto Montt, capital of Los Lagos Region. It began as a local affiliate of UCV Televisión, combining its local content with relays from the main station coming from Valparaíso. The station also produced local news and sports programs with LRC Producciones.

== History ==
At the beginning of the 1990s, the creation of a television station on channel 7 (also known as Canal 7 Regional) was achieved, an initiative created by the Archbishopric of Puerto Montt, which made an agreement with the Catholic University of Valparaíso to provide a local station that had a "cultural, educational and formative" line-up.

=== Test phase ===
The station started test broadcasts on January 2, 1990, at 7pm, broadcasting for three hours a day and for an initial period of one month. In this phase, its programming mostly consisted of imports, while the technical conditions for image and sound were being tested, to assist for a better reception in the urban radius. Once this phase was finished, it was expected that regional programming, including a local news service, would be added.

Its inaugural programming included cultural, educational and children's programming, such as Pipiripao, Expedición Andina, El Chavo del Ocho and programs on university courses, on a three-day delay from Valparaíso. The installation of the station implied an investment of approximately CL$20 million, used to acquire equipment and the technical habilitation of its first studios and transmitting blant in a mansion located close to the El Buen Pastor parish, in the upper part of the city.

Archbishop of Puerto Montt, Bernardo Cazzaro, noted the creation of the station as a high-grade initiative and a key tool for the integral development of the region, integrating spiritual, moral, social, economical and cultural dimensions. He also noted that the station should offer a postivie and formative schedule, free of violence and of content that were against the values of coexistence.

The creation of a local newscast was also seen as a strategic goal, to be seen in a different timeslot from the national ones, with local and national news. The project also had a gradual growth of broadcasting hours and technical coverage, through citizen support and financing by commercials, due to its self-financed character.

=== Official launch ===
On February 12, 1990, during the Semana Puertomontina in celebration of the anniversary of the founding of the city, Canal 7 UCV TV was founded in a ceremony held at the Salón de Honor de la Municipalidad, with the presence of civil, regional, military and ecclesiastical authorities. Among them was regional intendant Julio Maiers, archbishop of Puerto Montt Bernardo Cazzaro, archbishop of Valparaíso Francisco de Borja Valenzuela, UCV principal Juan Enrique Fremell and Puerto Montt mayor Martín Ercoreca.

In the occasion, principal Fremmel highlighted UCV TV's pioneer characteristics and its contribution to Chile's regionalization process, highlighting the editorial autonomy of the PUCV stations and its independence from financial pressure, as well as the lack of imposing content from a centralized network.

On his behalf, UCV TV director Camilo Lobos highlighted the technical and human efforts needed to accomplish the project. The act finished with an apostolical blessing from the archbishop of Puerto Montt.

On February 27, 1990 the project consolidated at an institutional level with the signing of a tripartive convention between the Intendancy of Los Lagos Region, Canal 7 and the Archbishop of Puerto Montt. This agreement established technical and professional cooperation from the Intendancy to strengthen the station, especially in the implementation of a local newscast, through a two-year equipment loan and financing of specialized personnel. In exchange, the station compromised to air such content with no cost for the regional government.

The news service, Horizonte regional, following the name of the main station in Valparaíso aired for the first time on March 12, 1990, presented by local journalists Antonio Segura and Susana Meersohn.

=== Frequency relocation and shutdown ===
In 1998, the station moved to channel 8, to avoid technical interference with La Red (channel 6) to improve its picture quality.

The station shut down in 2002, when the regional station ended and it became a full-time relayer of the main station from Valparaíso.

== Programs ==
- Horizonte Regional (news)
- Sur Deportes (sports)
- Pagina Uno (news)
