= Kanaal 7/Channel 7 =

Channel 7 (or Kanaal 7) was the first private radio station in Namibia. It started broadcasting on the 6 December 1993. Although it is a Christian station it broadcasts 50% Christian and 50% selected secular content. The head office and broadcasting facilities are situated in Windhoek, the capital of Namibia, and are linked via satellite with 35 FM transmitters country-wide, each operating on a separate frequency.
