= SEVEN Networks =

US corporation

SEVEN Networks, Inc.
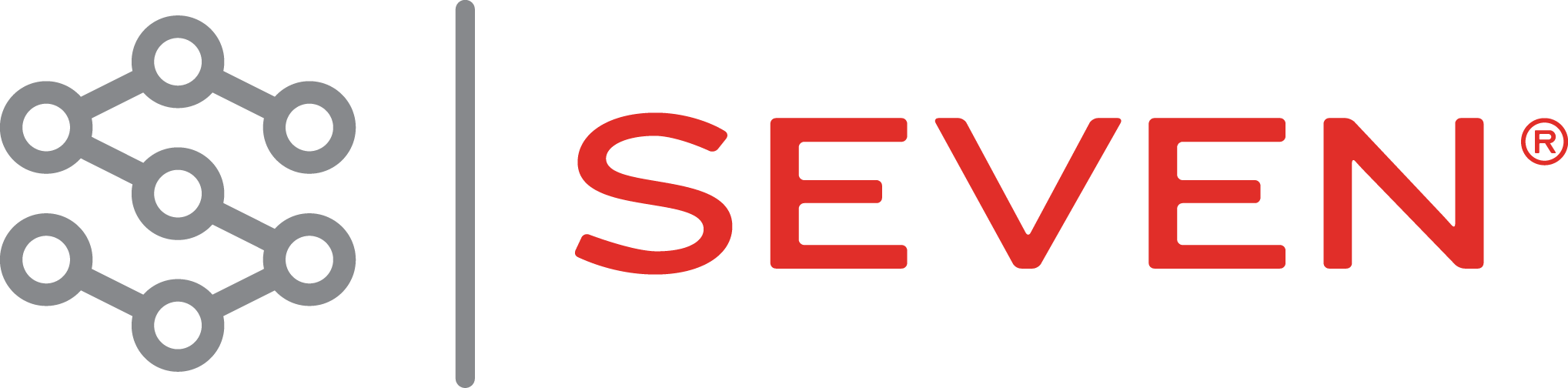
- Industry: Mobile software
- Founded: 2000
- Headquarters: Marshall, Texas
- Products: List: Ping Push Notifications Open Channel Mobile Messaging

SEVEN Networks, Inc. is a privately funded American corporation founded in 2000. It had about 265 employees in 2010. As of 2017, the company has research and development centers in Texas and Finland.

SEVEN mobile messaging products are turnkey multi-device, multi-service computer software for operators and device manufacturers. The company claims its products have a desktop-like experience for core messaging applications like email, instant messaging and social networking.

== History ==
The company was formerly known as Leap Corporation and changed its name to SEVEN Networks, Inc. in December 2000. In 2004, the company was selected for FierceWireless' list of 15 promising and innovative wireless startups of the year. By 2005, CEO Bill Nguyen had left to start another company. In 2006, the company announced Sprint as a customer.

Since then, the company expanded its products to support email services, added mobile instant messaging applications, analytics and social networking. In 2010, the company announced it was selected by Samsung Electronics to provide push technology for Samsung Social Hub, a social networking and integrated messaging service available on several of the company’s handsets. In January 2010, the company claimed in a press release to have over eight million accounts actively synchronized on mobile devices using its software. In early 2011, the company announced Verizon Wireless as a customer and also announced Open Channel.

In 2012, the company announced a combined email, instant messaging and social media product, Ping.

== Open Channel ==
The Open Channel software product line focuses on mobile traffic management and optimization. There are Open Channel products for wireless signaling optimization, carrier network policy enforcement, and mobile data offloading. Open Channel was launched in February 2011, as a service for carriers to manage the impact of push technology for message notifications on their networks. It works by monitoring requests for data from smartphone applications, such as Facebook, email and Twitter, which make up approximately two hundred of requests per hour, with only a small fraction of them actually returning data.

The platform acts as a buffer in the network, determining when content for a particular app is available and then allowing the phone access to that content. Early tests estimated mobile devices might reduce their time on a network by up to 40 percent and mobile traffic by up to 70 percent while boosting battery life by up to 25 percent. These numbers have not been updated since.

Open Channel is transparent to connected applications and requires no changes or special integration by mobile developers. It does not require changes to the network and can work with new standards for fast network dormancy, smart signaling and other network optimizations. In February 2011, Open Channel received the GSMA Global Mobile Award for Best Mobile Technology Breakthrough in 2011.

In February 2013, Open Channel added offerings for policy enforcement and offloading. Also in early 2013, Toronto-based wireless operator, Public Mobile, selected Open Channel to manage network signaling and reduce service costs stemming from non-optimized mobile applications and unnecessary data traffic, creating excess network congestion.

In September 2015, Open Channel was made available for individual customers.

== Mobile messaging ==
SEVEN's push notification platform, System SEVEN, is deployed as a SaaS (software-as-a-service) solution. SEVEN Mobile Email and SEVEN Mobile IM are SEVEN's applications built on top of its push platform and its Ping Services allow operators and device manufacturers to use the SEVEN push notification technology for messaging services and mobile applications. They provide mobile operators and device manufacturers with a service for integrated messaging services.

System SEVEN mobile email is a server-assisted service, where access to a user's email account appears to originate from IP addresses hosted by SEVEN (208.87.200.0 - 208.87.207.255) or its customers. Although done with the user's permission, email service providers may flag these as potential hacking attempts and have raised security concerns, most recently with Microsoft Outlook for Android and iOS.

== Partners ==
The firm works with mobile platform providers, device manufacturers, email messaging services, providers of services in the cloud, and infrastructure partners, to sell mobile messaging services.

Its systems use commonly deployed mobile platforms including Android, Bada, BREW, J2ME, Symbian and Windows Mobile. They work on products from device manufacturers, including HTC, INQ, LG, Motorola, Nokia, Sanyo, Samsung, and Sony Ericsson; and are embedded in over 550 device types. The firm has partnered with many of the top Internet service providers including Google, Microsoft (Exchange and Windows Live) and Yahoo!, and infrastructure providers such as Equinix, Savvis and Oracle.

== Competition ==
- Apple Push Notification Service (APNs)
- Google Cloud Messaging
- Good Technology
- GoS Networks
- Nokia Messaging
- OpenNet
- Research In Motion (RIM, BlackBerry)
- Outlook Mobile
