= Severny (inhabited locality) =

Severny (Russian: Се́верный; masculine), Severnaya (Се́верная; feminine), or Severnoye (Се́верное; neuter) is the name of several inhabited localities in Russia.

== Modern inhabited localities ==
=== Republic of Adygea ===
As of 2010, one rural locality in the Republic of Adygea bears this name:

- Severny, Republic of Adygea, a settlement under the administrative jurisdiction of the city of Maykop

=== Altai Krai ===
As of 2010, one rural locality in Altai Krai bears this name:

- Severny, Altai Krai, a settlement in Severny Selsoviet of Pervomaysky District

=== Amur Oblast ===
As of 2010, one rural locality in Amur Oblast bears this name:

- Severnoye, Amur Oblast, a selo in Severny Rural Settlement of Arkharinsky District

=== Republic of Bashkortostan ===
As of 2010, two rural localities in the Republic of Bashkortostan bear this name:

- Severny, Republic of Bashkortostan, a village in Almukhametovsky Selsoviet of Abzelilovsky District
- Severnaya, Republic of Bashkortostan, a village in Oktyabrsky Selsoviet of Sterlitamaksky District

=== Belgorod Oblast ===
As of 2010, one urban locality in Belgorod Oblast bears this name:

- Severny, Belgorod Oblast, a settlement in Belgorodsky District

=== Republic of Buryatia ===
As of 2010, one rural locality in the Republic of Buryatia bears this name:

- Severny, Republic of Buryatia, a settlement in Severny Selsoviet of Bauntovsky District

=== Chelyabinsk Oblast ===
As of 2010, four rural localities in Chelyabinsk Oblast bear this name:

- Severny, Kyshtym, Chelyabinsk Oblast, a settlement under the administrative jurisdiction of the city of Kyshtym
- Severny, Kusinsky District, Chelyabinsk Oblast, a settlement in Zlokazovsky Selsoviet of Kusinsky District
- Severny, Nagaybaksky District, Chelyabinsk Oblast, a settlement in Kulikovsky Selsoviet of Nagaybaksky District
- Severny, Sosnovsky District, Chelyabinsk Oblast, a settlement in Kremenkulsky Selsoviet of Sosnovsky District

=== Chuvash Republic ===
As of 2010, one rural locality in the Chuvash Republic bears this name:

- Severny, Chuvash Republic, a settlement under the administrative jurisdiction of the city of Cheboksary

=== Republic of Kalmykia ===
As of 2010, two rural localities in the Republic of Kalmykia bear this name:

- Severny, Republic of Kalmykia, a settlement in Idzhilskaya Rural Administration of Oktyabrsky District
- Severnoye, Republic of Kalmykia, a selo in Severnaya Rural Administration of Lagansky District

=== Republic of Karelia ===
As of 2010, one rural locality in the Republic of Karelia bears this name:

- Severny, Republic of Karelia, a settlement in Muyezersky District

=== Kemerovo Oblast ===
As of 2010, two rural localities in Kemerovo Oblast bear this name:

- Severny, Kemerovo Oblast, a settlement in Metallurgskaya Rural Territory of Mezhdurechensky District
- Severnaya, Kemerovo Oblast, a village in Pashkovskaya Rural Territory of Tyazhinsky District

=== Kirov Oblast ===
As of 2010, three rural localities in Kirov Oblast bear this name:

- Severny, Omutninsky District, Kirov Oblast, a settlement in Zalazninsky Rural Okrug of Omutninsky District
- Severny, Oparinsky District, Kirov Oblast, a settlement in Rechnoy Rural Okrug of Oparinsky District
- Severny, Yuryansky District, Kirov Oblast, a settlement in Ivanovsky Rural Okrug of Yuryansky District

=== Komi Republic ===
As of 2010, one urban locality in the Komi Republic bears this name:

- Severny, Komi Republic, an urban-type settlement under the administrative jurisdiction of the town of Vorkuta

=== Kostroma Oblast ===
As of 2010, two rural localities in Kostroma Oblast bear this name:

- Severny, Kostroma Oblast, a settlement in Pyshchugskoye Settlement of Pyshchugsky District
- Severnoye, Kostroma Oblast, a selo in Severnoye Settlement of Susaninsky District

=== Kurgan Oblast ===
As of 2010, three rural localities in Kurgan Oblast bear this name:

- Severny, Kurgan Oblast, a village in Trudovskoy Selsoviet of Zverinogolovsky District
- Severnoye, Kurgan Oblast, a village in Kashirinsky Selsoviet of Ketovsky District
- Severnaya, Kurgan Oblast, a village in Severny Selsoviet of Kargapolsky District

=== Kursk Oblast ===
As of 2013, two rural localities in Kursk Oblast bear this name:

- Severny, Kursky District, Kursk Oblast, a settlement in Nizhnemedveditsky Selsoviet of Kursky District
- Severny, Ponyrovsky District, Kursk Oblast, a khutor in Pervomaysky Selsoviet of Ponyrovsky District

=== Lipetsk Oblast ===
As of 2010, one rural locality in Lipetsk Oblast bears this name:

- Severny, Lipetsk Oblast, a settlement in Lipovsky Selsoviet of Volovsky District

=== Mari El Republic ===
As of 2010, one rural locality in the Mari El Republic bears this name:

- Severny, Mari El Republic, a vyselok in Krasnoyarsky Rural Okrug of Zvenigovsky District

=== Moscow Oblast ===
As of 2010, two inhabited localities in Moscow Oblast bear this name:

- Severny, Taldomsky District, Moscow Oblast, an urban locality (a work settlement) in Taldomsky District
- Severny, Istrinsky District, Moscow Oblast, a rural locality (a settlement) in Luchinskoye Rural Settlement of Istrinsky District

=== Nizhny Novgorod Oblast ===
As of 2010, four rural localities in Nizhny Novgorod Oblast bear this name:

- Severny, Dzerzhinsk, Nizhny Novgorod Oblast, a settlement under the administrative jurisdiction of the city of Dzerzhinsk
- Severny, Shakhunsky District, Nizhny Novgorod Oblast, a settlement in Khmelevitsky Selsoviet of Shakhunsky District
- Severny, Varnavinsky District, Nizhny Novgorod Oblast, a settlement in Severny Selsoviet of Varnavinsky District
- Severny, Voskresensky District, Nizhny Novgorod Oblast, a settlement in Vozdvizhensky Selsoviet of Voskresensky District

=== Novosibirsk Oblast ===
As of 2010, two rural localities in Novosibirsk Oblast bear this name:

- Severny, Novosibirsk Oblast, a settlement in Kolyvansky District
- Severnoye, Novosibirsk Oblast, a selo in Severny District

=== Omsk Oblast ===
As of 2010, six rural localities in Omsk Oblast bear this name:

- Severny, Boyevoy Rural Okrug, Isilkulsky District, Omsk Oblast, a settlement in Boyevoy Rural Okrug of Isilkulsky District
- Severny, Lesnoy Rural Okrug, Isilkulsky District, Omsk Oblast, a settlement in Lesnoy Rural Okrug of Isilkulsky District
- Severnoye, Cherlaksky District, Omsk Oblast, a village in Solyansky Rural Okrug of Cherlaksky District
- Severnoye, Moskalensky District, Omsk Oblast, a village in Elitovsky Rural Okrug of Moskalensky District
- Severnoye, Sherbakulsky District, Omsk Oblast, a village in Izyumovsky Rural Okrug of Sherbakulsky District
- Severnaya, Omsk Oblast, a village in Alexeyevsky Rural Okrug of Gorkovsky District

=== Orenburg Oblast ===
As of 2010, three rural localities in Orenburg Oblast bear this name:

- Severny, Alexandrovsky District, Orenburg Oblast, a settlement in Romanovsky Selsoviet of Alexandrovsky District
- Severny, Sakmarsky District, Orenburg Oblast, a settlement in Svetly Selsoviet of Sakmarsky District
- Severnoye, Orenburg Oblast, a selo in Severny Selsoviet of Severny District

=== Rostov Oblast ===
As of 2010, three rural localities in Rostov Oblast bear this name:

- Severny, Oblivsky District, Rostov Oblast, a settlement in Oblivskoye Rural Settlement of Oblivsky District
- Severny, Tselinsky District, Rostov Oblast, a khutor in Kirovskoye Rural Settlement of Tselinsky District
- Severny, Vesyolovsky District, Rostov Oblast, a settlement in Verkhnesolenovskoye Rural Settlement of Vesyolovsky District

=== Ryazan Oblast ===
As of 2010, one rural locality in Ryazan Oblast bears this name:

- Severny, Ryazan Oblast, a settlement in Murminsky Rural Okrug of Ryazansky District

=== Samara Oblast ===
As of 2010, two rural localities in Samara Oblast bear this name:

- Severny, Klyavlinsky District, Samara Oblast, a settlement in Klyavlinsky District
- Severny, Shentalinsky District, Samara Oblast, a settlement in Shentalinsky District

=== Saratov Oblast ===
As of 2010, two rural localities in Saratov Oblast bear this name:

- Severny, Khvalynsky District, Saratov Oblast, a settlement in Khvalynsky District
- Severny, Ozinsky District, Saratov Oblast, a settlement in Ozinsky District

=== Stavropol Krai ===
As of 2010, three rural localities in Stavropol Krai bear this name:

- Severny, Shpakovsky District, Stavropol Krai, a settlement in Shpakovsky District
- Severny, Stepnovsky District, Stavropol Krai, a khutor in Stepnovsky District
- Severnoye, Stavropol Krai, a selo in Alexandrovsky District

=== Sverdlovsk Oblast ===
As of 2010, two rural localities in Sverdlovsk Oblast bear this name:

- Severny, Sverdlovsk Oblast, a settlement under the administrative jurisdiction of the town of Ivdel
- Severnaya, Sverdlovsk Oblast, a village in Verkhnesaldinsky District

=== Tambov Oblast ===
As of 2010, one rural locality in Tambov Oblast bears this name:

- Severny, Tambov Oblast, a settlement in Kovylsky Selsoviet of Kirsanovsky District

=== Tomsk Oblast ===
As of 2010, one rural locality in Tomsk Oblast bears this name:

- Severny, Tomsk Oblast, a settlement in Alexandrovsky District

=== Tver Oblast ===
As of 2010, one rural locality in Tver Oblast bears this name:

- Severny, Tver Oblast, a settlement in Krasnokholmsky District

=== Tyumen Oblast ===
As of 2010, one rural locality in Tyumen Oblast bears this name:

- Severnaya, Tyumen Oblast, a village in Aromashevsky District

=== Udmurt Republic ===
As of 2010, one rural locality in the Udmurt Republic bears this name:

- Severny, Udmurt Republic, a selo in Severny Selsoviet of Sarapulsky District

=== Volgograd Oblast ===
As of 2010, two rural localities in Volgograd Oblast bear this name:

- Severny, Bykovsky District, Volgograd Oblast, a settlement in Krasnoseltsevsky Selsoviet of Bykovsky District
- Severny, Svetloyarsky District, Volgograd Oblast, a settlement in Narimanovsky Selsoviet of Svetloyarsky District

=== Vologda Oblast ===
As of 2010, two rural localities in Vologda Oblast bear this name:

- Severny, Velikoustyugsky District, Vologda Oblast, a settlement in Susolovsky Selsoviet of Velikoustyugsky District
- Severny, Vytegorsky District, Vologda Oblast, a settlement in Devyatinsky Selsoviet of Vytegorsky District

== Abolished inhabited localities ==
- Severny, Sakha Republic, a former urban locality (a settlement) in the Sakha Republic, abolished in 2004
