= Severny =

Severny (Russian: Северный, 'northern') (masculine), Severnaya (Северная) (feminine), or Severnoye (Северное) (neutral) may refer to:

== People ==
- Andrei Severny (astronomer) (1913–1987), Soviet astronomer
- Andrei Severny (filmmaker) (born 1977), Russian filmmaker and photographer
- Arkady Severny (1939–1980), performer of Russian criminal songs
- Count and Countess Severny, pseudonyms of Tsar Paul I of Russia and Tsaritsa Maria Feodorovna

== Places ==
- Severny District, several districts and city districts in Russia
- Severny Okrug (disambiguation), various divisions in Russia
- Severny Urban Settlement, several municipal urban settlements in Russia
- Severny (inhabited locality) (Severnaya, Severnoye), several inhabited localities in Russia
- Severny Island, Russia
- Severny, a volcano on the Kamchatka Peninsula, Russia
- Severny (air base), Orsk, Russia
- Severny Airport, Novosibirsk, Russia
- Severny Airport, Smolensk also known as "North" IATA LNX
- Severny mine, a copper mine in Murmansk Oblast, Russia
- Severnoye (Sharbakty District), a village in Pavlodar Region, Kazakhstan

== Other uses ==
- Severny (grape), a Russian red-grape variety
- 1737 Severny, an asteroid
- Severnaya, a fictional location in the film GoldenEye

== See also ==
- Severní, a settlement in the Czech Republic
- Severn (disambiguation)
- Northern (disambiguation)
- Severnaya Zemlya, an island group in Russia
- Yuzhny (disambiguation) ('southern')
