= Severny District =

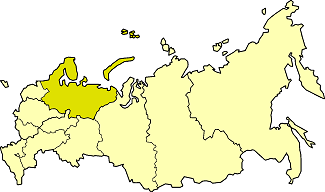
Northern economic region in Russia

Location of Moscow in Russia

Location of Novosibirsk Oblast in Russia

Location of Orenburg Oblast in Russia

Severny District is the name of several administrative and municipal districts in Russia. The name literally means "northern".

== Economic regions ==
- Northern economic region (Severny ekonomichesky rayon), an economic region

== Districts of the federal subjects ==
- Severny District, Moscow, a district in North-Eastern Administrative Okrug of Moscow
- Severny District, Novosibirsk Oblast, an administrative and municipal district of Novosibirsk Oblast
- Severny District, Orenburg Oblast, an administrative and municipal district of Orenburg Oblast

== City divisions ==
- Severny City District, Oryol, a city district of Oryol, the administrative center of Oryol Oblast
- Severny Territorial Okrug, a territorial okrug of the city of Arkhangelsk, the administrative center of Arkhangelsk Oblast
Cities in Russia with a city division called "Severny"

== See also ==
- Severny (disambiguation)
- Severny Okrug (disambiguation)
