= Extreme points of the Czech Republic =

Extreme points of the Czech Republic

This is a list of the extreme points of the Czech Republic:

== Latitude and longitude ==
- North: Near Severní, part of Lobendava municipality, Ústí nad Labem Region (51°03′20″N 14°18′53″E), which is also the most northern settlement (51°02′11″N 14°18′48″E). The most northern former settlement is Fukov (51°02′33″N 14°30′07″E), whose population was mostly exiled in 1945 and was demolished entirely in 1960. Also applied to Czechoslovakia and the Kingdom of Bohemia as a part of Austria-Hungary.
- South: Near Studánky, a part Vyšší Brod municipality, South Bohemian Region (48°33′09″N 14°19′59″E), which is also the most southern settlement (48°35′23″N 14°19′33″E). The most southern former settlement is Radvanov (48°33′37″N 14°20′29″E). Also applied to the Kingdom of Bohemia as a part of Austria-Hungary.
- West: Near Krásná, which is itself close to Aš, Karlovy Vary Region (50°15′09″N 12°05′26″E). A nearby village named Pastviny, administered by the town of Hranice is the most western settlement (50°16′30″N 12°09′01″E). The most western former settlement is Újezd u Krásné (50°14′59″N 12°06′40″E). Also applied to Czechoslovakia and the Kingdom of Bohemia as a part of Austria-Hungary.
- East: Near Bukovec, Moravian-Silesian Region (49°33′01″N 18°51′32″E), which is also the most eastern settlement (49°33′04″N 18°49′37″E). There is no former settlement further east within the current borders, since unlike the other this area was not subject to the exile of the Sudetenland Germans in 1945. Did not apply during the era of the Kingdom of Bohemia as a part of Austria-Hungary, since the lands of Cieszyn Silesia administered then by the Crown of Bohemia, but now within Poland, were further east.

=== Train stations ===
- North: Černousy, near Frýdlant, Liberec district (51°00′28″N 15°02′15″E)
- South: Těchoraz, near Vyšší Brod, Český Krumlov district (48°37′09″N 14°20′58″E)
- West: Štítary, near Aš, Cheb district (50°14′35″N 12°09′19″E)
- East: Návsí, Frýdek-Místek district (49°35′24″N 18°45′17″E)

== Altitude ==
- Maximum natural: Sněžka Mountain, Hradec Králové Region, 1,603 m (50°44′10″N 15°44′25″E)
- Maximum artificial: The tip of a radio and television transmitter on Praděd, Šumperk District, 1,638 m (50°04′59″N 17°13′52″E)
- Minimum natural above water: Elbe River in Hřensko, Ústí nad Labem Region, 115 m (50°53′15″N 14°13′59″E)
- Minimum natural below water: Hranice Abyss, by Hranice (Přerov District) is at least 473m deep and is predicted to be between 800 and 1200m deep. With the top around 300m this would put the bottom at at least 150m and estimated to actually be around 500 to 900m below sea level (49°31′56″N 17°45′02″E)
- Minimum artificial: The bottom of a Brown coal mine named Bílina, near the city of Bílina, Teplice District, 20 m (50°34′08″N 13°43′10″E)
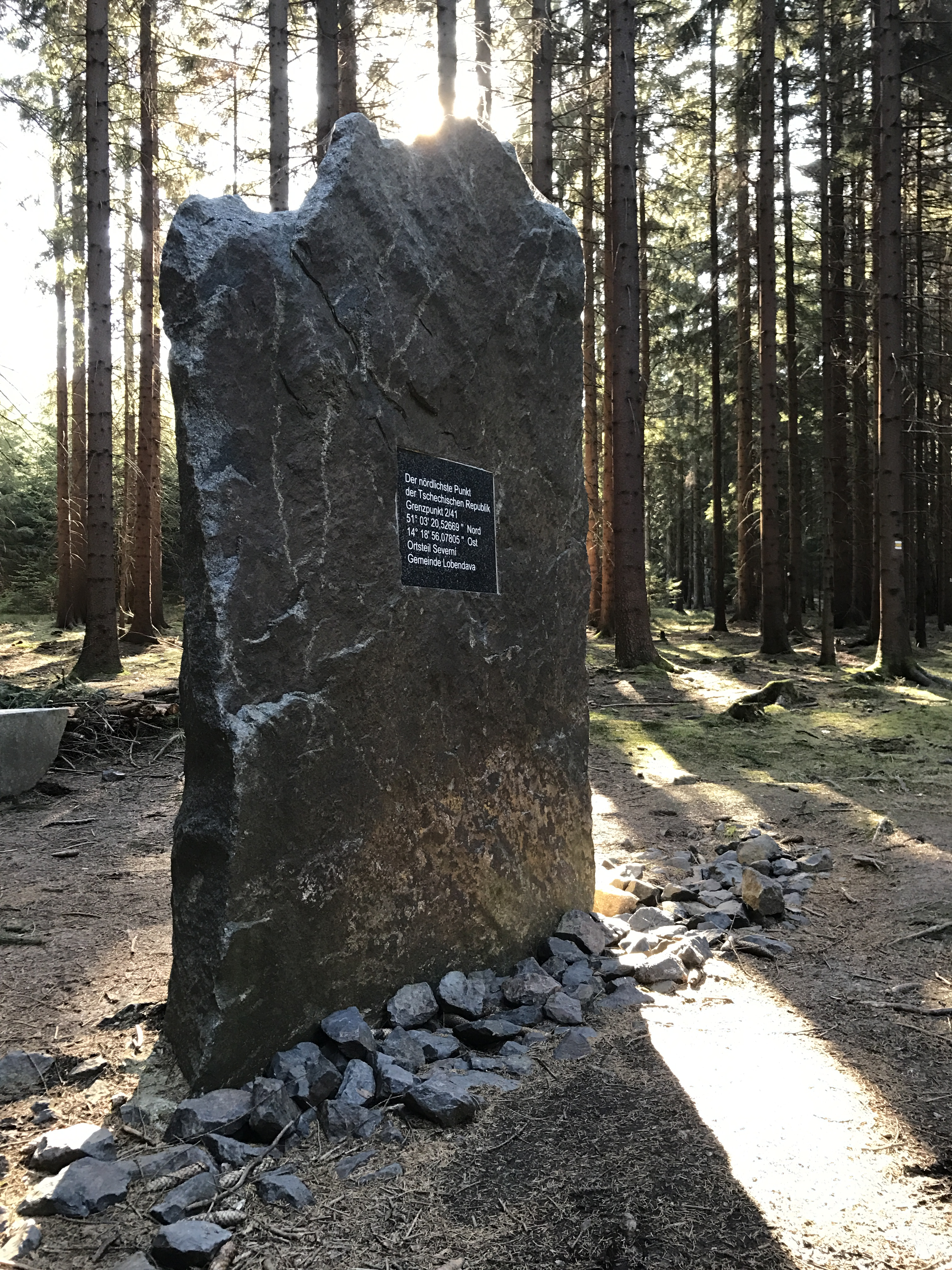
Northernmost point

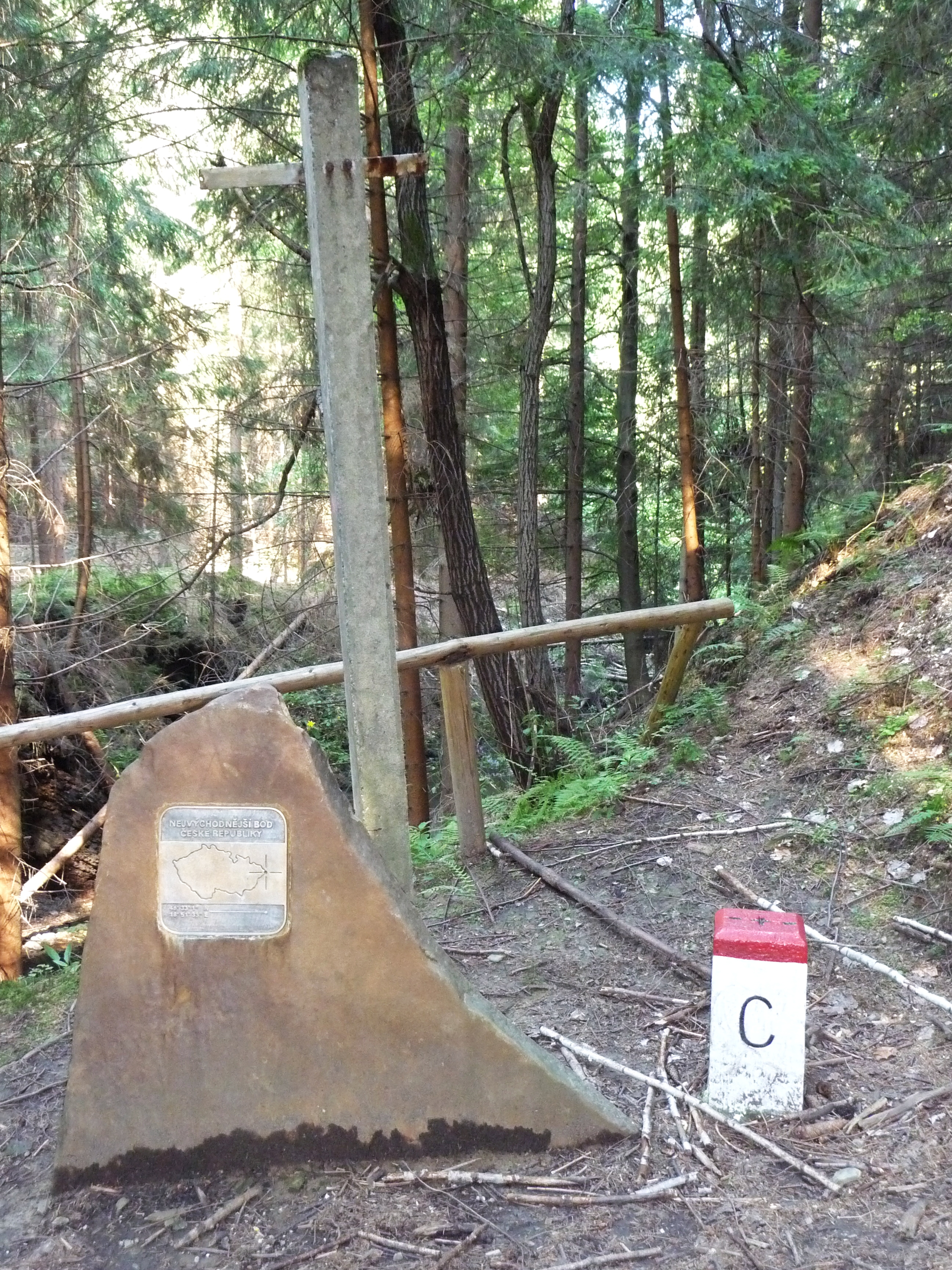
Easternmost point

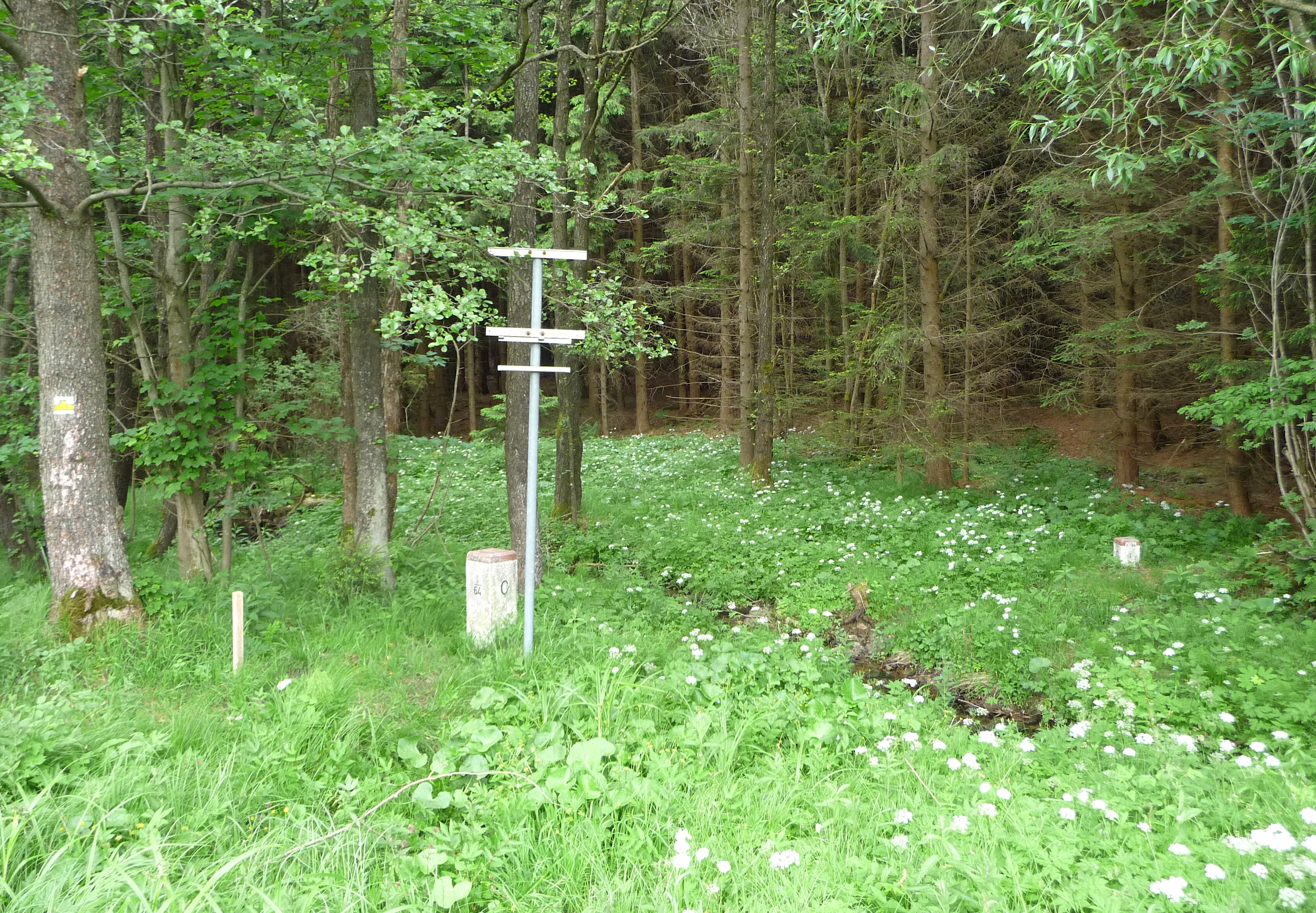
Southernmost point

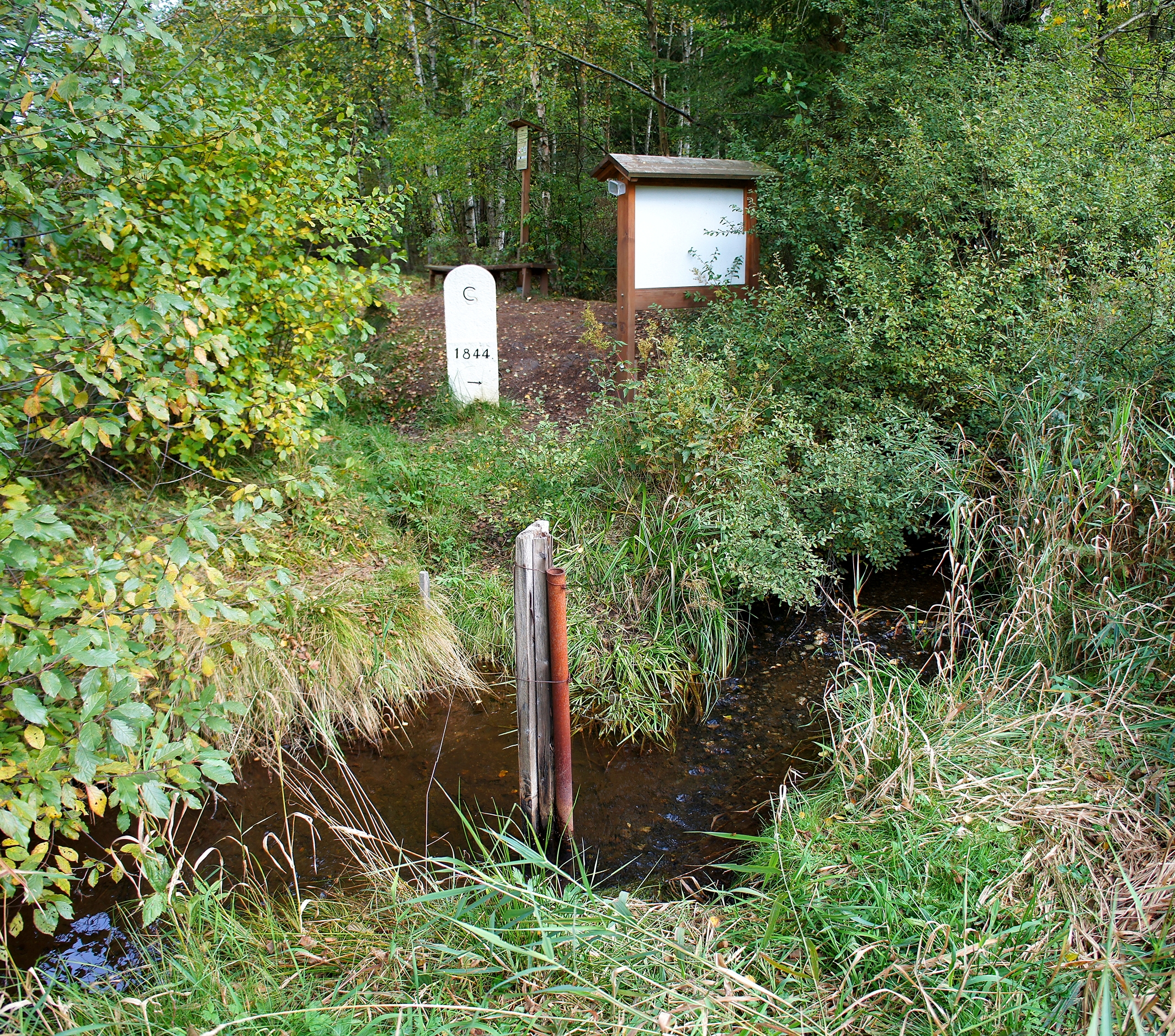
Westernmost point

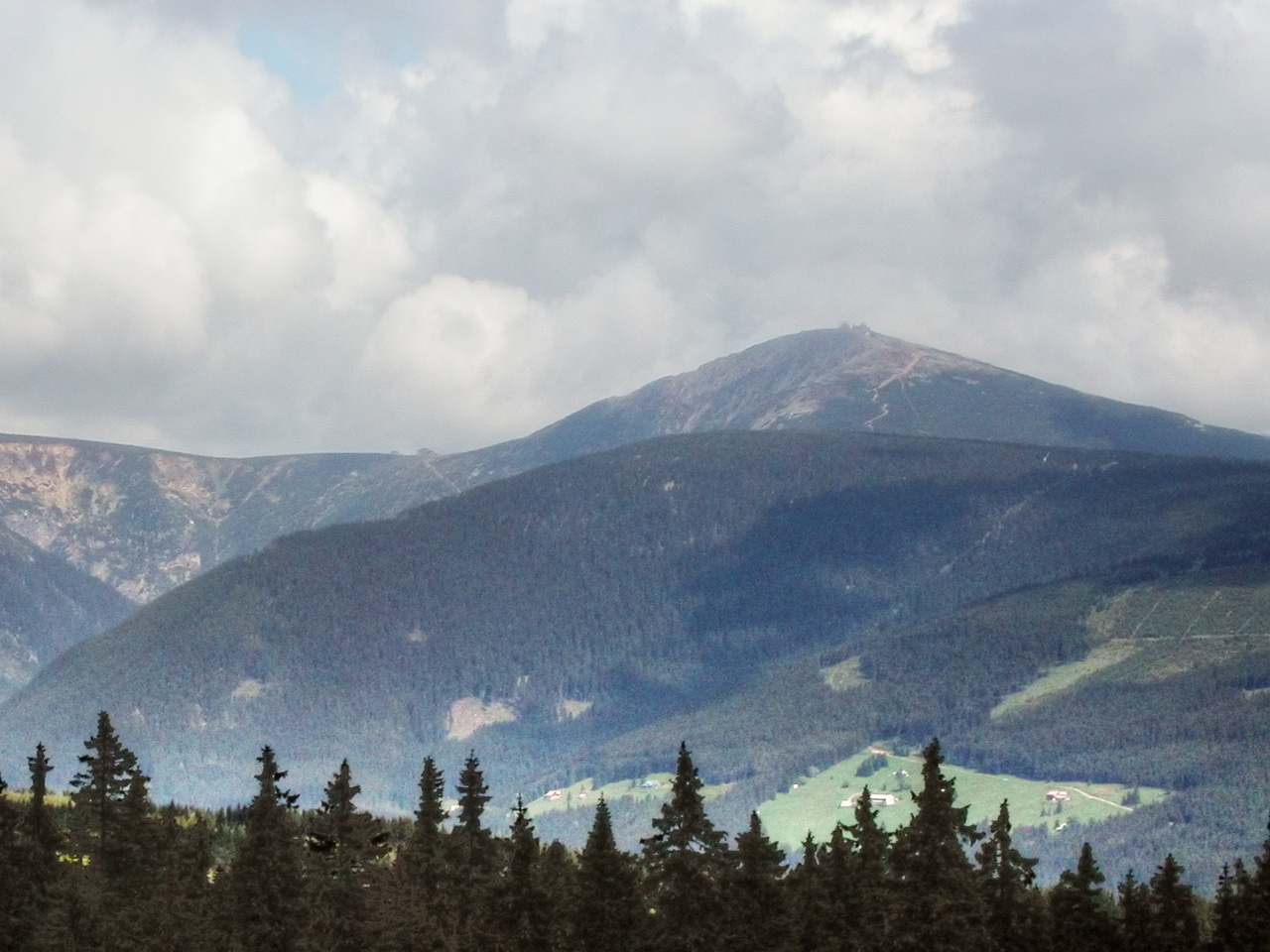
Mt. Sněžka

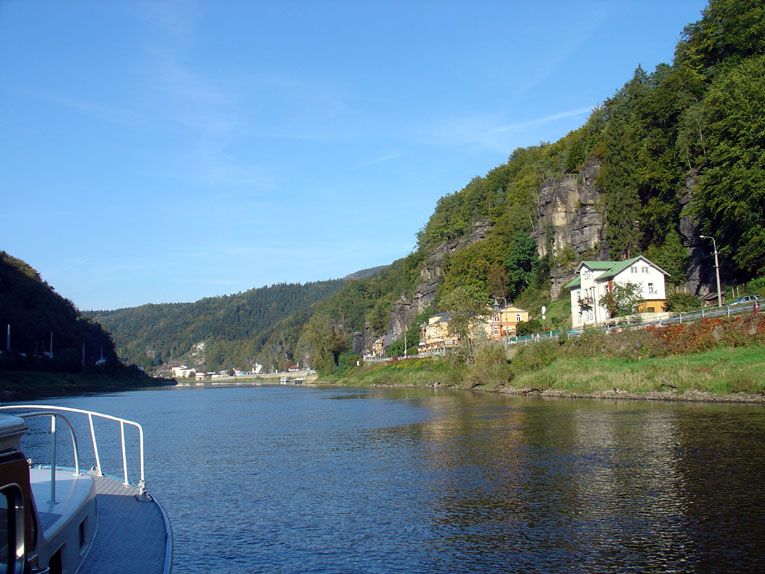
Elbe River in Hřensko

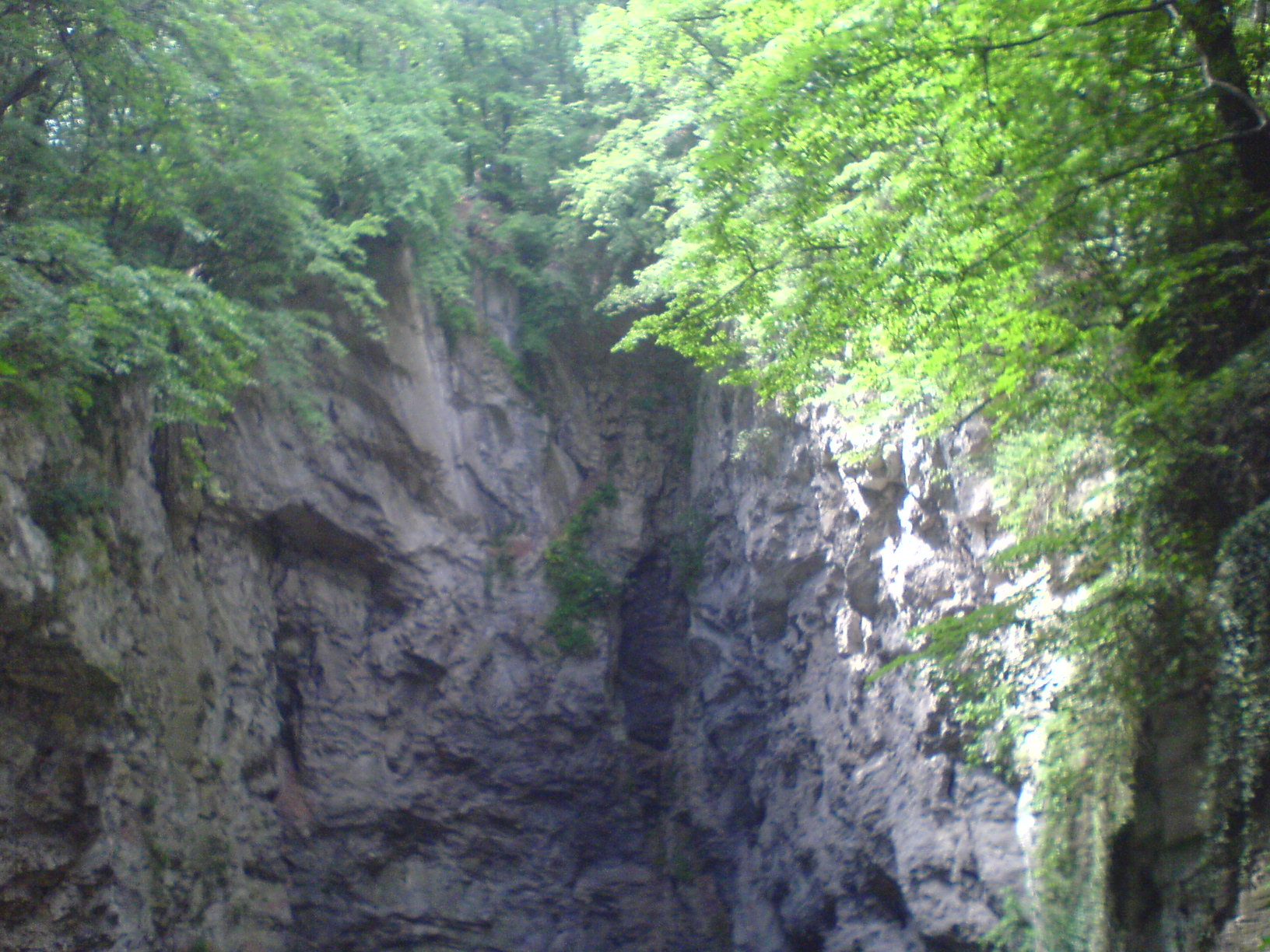
Hranice Abyss

== See also ==
- Extreme points of Moravia
- Extreme points of Europe
- Extreme points of Earth
- Geography of the Czech Republic
- Prague Poles, extreme points of Prague
