= Northerns =

Northerns may refer to the following:

== Sports ==
- Northerns cricket team, a South African cricket team formerly called called North Eastern Transvaal
- Northerns women's cricket team, the women's counterpart
- Northerns cricket team (Zimbabwe), a former first-class cricket team in Zimbabwe that competed in the Logan Cup from 2006 to 2009

== See also ==
- Northern cricket team, a domestic cricket team in Pakistan from 2019 to 2023
- Northern (disambiguation)
