= Northern Territories =

Northern Territories may refer to several geographic locations:

- Northern Territories (北方領土, Hoppō Ryōdo), a term used by Japan in territorial disputes to refer to the parts of Kuril Islands claimed by Japan and occupied by Russia.
- Historical name of part of Ghana, a former British Empire protectorate, itself divided into the Northern, Upper East and Upper West Regions of modern Ghana
- Historical name for the regions of Northern Rhodesia and Nyasaland within the Federation of Rhodesia and Nyasaland

It may informally refer to:

- Northern territories of Canada, the Yukon Territory, Northwest Territories, and Nunavut
- Northern territories of Israel, the Northern District and occupied Golan Heights

== See also ==
- Northwest Territories, a Canadian territory
- Northern Territory, an Australian territory
- Northern (disambiguation) to see other types
