= Andrei Severny =

Andrei Severny may refer to:

- Andrei Severny (astronomer)
- Andrei Severny (filmmaker)
