= Kamennogorsky =

Kamennogorsky (masculine), Kamennogorskaya (feminine), or Kamennogorskoye (neuter) may refer to:

- Kamennogorskoye Urban Settlement, a municipal formation corresponding to Kamennogorskoye Settlement Municipal Formation, an administrative division of Vyborgsky District of Leningrad Oblast, Russia
- Kamennogorskoye (rural locality), a rural locality (a selo) in Severny District of Orenburg Oblast
