= Northern College =

Northern College may refer to:

- Northern College (England), residential adult education college situated near Barnsley, United Kingdom
- Northern College (Ontario), a community college in Ontario, Canada
- For the former teacher training college in Scotland, see University of Aberdeen or University of Dundee.

== See also ==
- Royal Northern College of Music, Manchester, England
- Northern University (disambiguation)
