= Albrecht Unsöld =

German astrophysicist (1905-1995)

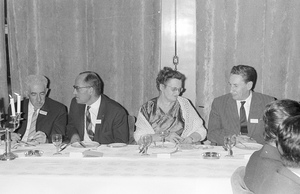
Utrecht Astronomy Symposium 1963. Left to right: Marcel Minnaert, Albrecht Unsöld, Miep Minnaert, Andrei Severny.

Albrecht Otto Johannes Unsöld (20 April 1905 – 23 September 1995) was a German astrophysicist known for his contributions to spectroscopic analysis of stellar atmospheres.

== Career ==
Albrecht Unsöld was born in Bolheim, Württemberg, Germany. After school attendance in Heidenheim, Unsöld studied physics at the University of Tübingen and the Ludwig-Maximilians-Universität München. At the Ludwig-Maximilians-Universität München, he studied under Arnold Sommerfeld, and was granted his doctorate in 1927. As a Fellow of the Rockefeller Foundation, he was an assistant in Potsdam and worked at the Mount Wilson Observatory in Pasadena, California. He then completed his Habilitation at the Ludwig-Maximilians-Universität München in 1929. In 1930, he was an assistant at the Institute of Theoretical Physics at the University of Hamburg. In September 1932, Unsöld became Ordinarius Professor and Director of the Institute for Theoretical Physics (and Observatory) at Kiel University – a position he held until his emeritus status was granted in 1973, after which he remained scientifically active for 15 years.

While a student at the Ludwig-Maximilians-Universität München, Unsöld was one of many of a long line of students who helped Sommerfeld explore and advance atomic theory. Unsöld's theorem states that the square of the total electron wavefunction for a filled or half-filled sub-shell is spherically symmetric. Thus, like atoms containing a half-filled or filled s orbital (l = 0), atoms of the second period with 3 or 6 p (l = 1) electrons are spherically shaped. Likewise, so are atoms of the third period in which there are 5 or 10 d (l = 2) electrons. Hence, spherical atoms are those of the 1st, 2nd, 7th, 12th, 15th and 18th columns of the periodic table.

At Kiel University, Unsöld made an intensive study of the effects of abundances, radiation damping, Doppler shifts, electric fields, and collisions on the formation and shape of spectral lines in stellar atmospheres. His analysis of the B0 star Tau Scorpii, obtained on his 1939 visit to Yerkes and McDonald Observatories, provided the first detailed analysis of a star other than the Sun, and he was able to determine the physics and composition of the star's atmosphere.

From 1947 to 1948, Unsöld was President of the Astronomische Gesellschaft.

Unsöld edited the Zeitschrift für Astrophysik until it was merged with other European journals into Astronomy and Astrophysics. He was also the author of many books, and his book Physik der Sternatmosphären mit besonderer Berücksichtigung der Sonne was a bible for quantitative stellar spectroscopy and related fields, with special emphasis on the Sun.

== Honors ==
- 1956 – Bruce Medal
- 1957 – Gold Medal of the Royal Astronomical Society
- The asteroid 2842 Unsöld is named in his honor.

== Books ==
- Albrecht Unsöld Physik der Sternatmosphären mit besonderer Berücksichtigung der Sonne (Springer, 1955, 1968, and 1982)
- Albrecht Unsöld Max Planck (Hirt, 1958)
- Albrecht Unsöld Über die mittleren Zustandsgrössen und Spektren der Sternatmosphären in Abhängigkeit von ihrem Wasserstoff- und Heliumgehalt (Vandenhoeck & Ruprecht, 1958)
- Albrecht Unsöld Der neue Kosmos (Springer, 1967 and 1981)
  - Albrecht Unsöld The New Cosmos (Longmans, 1969)
- Albrecht Unsöld Sterne und Menschen: Aufsätze u. Voträge (Springer, 1972)
- Albrecht Unsöld Evolution kosmischer, biologischer und geistiger Strukturen (Wissenschaftliche Verlagsgesellschaft, 1981 and 1983)
- Albrecht Unsöld und Bodo Baschek Der neue Kosmos. Einführung in die Astronomie und Astrophysik (Springer-Verlag GmbH, 1991, 2001, and 2004)
  - Albrecht Unsöld und Bodo Baschek The New Cosmos (Heidelberg Science Library) (Springer-Verlag GmbH, 1991)
  - Albrecht Unsöld, Bodo Baschek, W.D. Brewer (Translator) The New Cosmos: An Introduction to Astronomy and Astrophysics (Springer, 5th Edition, 2005) ISBN 978-3-540-67877-9

== Selected literature ==
- Albrecht Unsöld Beiträge zur Quantenmechanik des Atoms, Ann. d. Phys. (4) 82 355-393 (1927). Received 22 December 1926, published in issue No. 3. of 8 February 1927. As cited in Mehra, Volume 5, Part 2, 2001, p. 959.
