= Extreme points of Moravia =

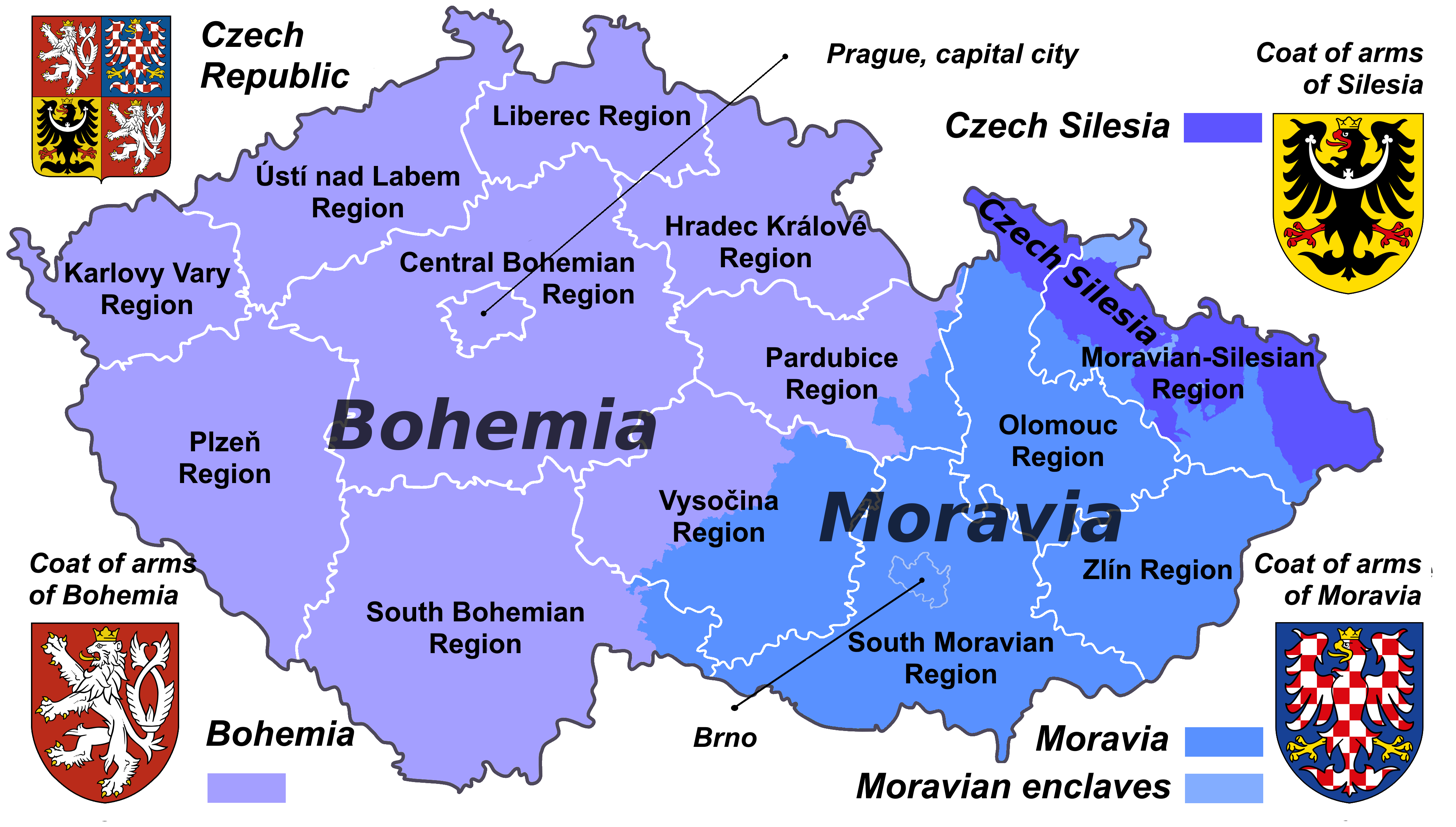
Historical lands of the Czech Republic

This is a list of the extreme points of Moravia. As there is no current official definition of the borders of Moravia, this list is based on the borders of the historical Moravian land (země Moravská) that existed as an autonomous part of Czechoslovakia until 1928, before having been merged into Moravian–Silesian land (země Moravskoslezská).

== Latitude and longitude ==
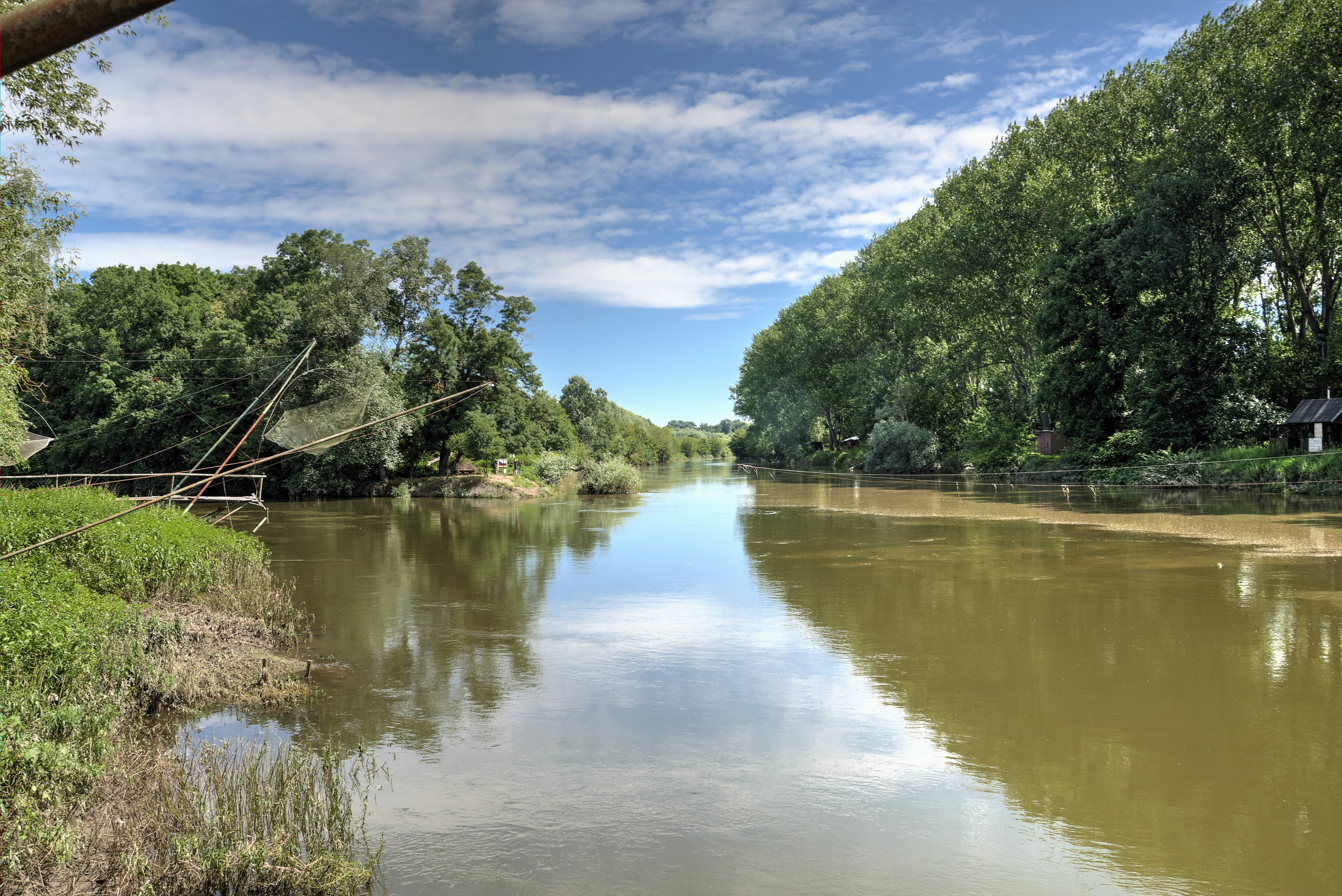
The confluence of Morava and Thaya, the southernmost and the lowest point of Moravia

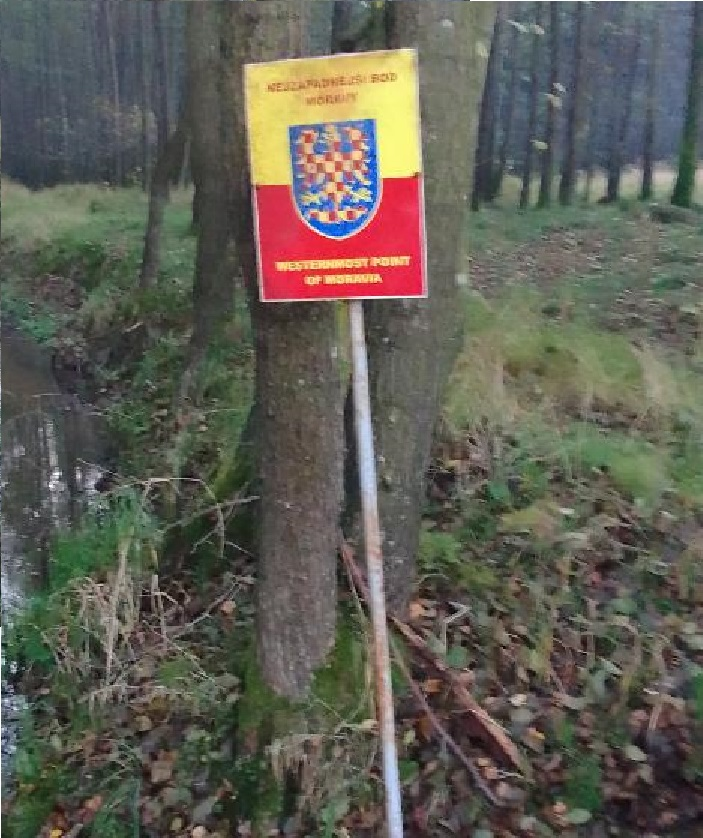
The westernmost point of Moravia

- North: mountain of Polská hora in Staré Město and Stronie Śląskie on the Czech–Polish borders 50.244854°N 16.976267°E
- South: the confluence of Thaya and Morava near Lanžhot 48.617147°N 16.940377°E, also the lowest point of Moravia
- West: a confluence of two brooks near Strmilov 49.196429°N 15.133183°E
- East: Čudácka Mountain on the Czech–Slovak border, in municipalities Bílá (Czech Republic) and Klokočov (Slovakia) 49.468203°N 18.548077°E

== Altitude ==
- Maximum: near the summit of Praděd (1,491 m), although the summit itself is in Czech Silesia.
- Minimum: the confluence of Thaya and Morava (also the southernmost point), 148 m.
- Minimum natural below water: bottom of the Hranice Abyss (49.532°N 17.750778°E), the deepest flooded pit cave in the world. Its bottom has not been reached yet; the greatest confirmed depth is 473.5 m, but the estimated depth is about 1 km.

== See also ==
- Extreme points of the Czech Republic
