= 1737 Severny =

Main-belt asteroid

Discovery
- Discovered by: L. Chernykh
- Discovery site: Crimean Astrophysical Obs.
- Discovery date: 13 October 1966

Designations
- Named after: Andrei Severny (observatory's director)
- Alternative designations: 1966 TJ · 1942 CA; 1944 OF · 1950 TM; 1950 TP_{4} · 1951 YF_{2} 1963 DH
- Minor planet category: main-belt · Eos

Orbital characteristics
- Epoch 4 September 2017 (JD 2458000.5)
- Uncertainty parameter 0
- Observation arc: 65.83 yr (24,044 days)
- Aphelion: 3.1578 AU
- Perihelion: 2.8644 AU
- Semi-major axis: 3.0111 AU
- Eccentricity: 0.0487
- Orbital period (sidereal): 5.23 yr (1,908 days)
- Mean anomaly: 112.51°
- Inclination: 9.3772°
- Longitude of ascending node: 327.44°
- Argument of perihelion: 221.77°

Physical characteristics
- Dimensions: 21.334±0.158; 21.40 km (calculated); 21.61±2.7 km 22.793±0.122 km 24.83±1.47 km
- Synodic rotation period: 9.2481±0.0625 h 14.11±0.07 h
- Geometric albedo: 0.1363±0.0267; 0.139±0.018; 0.14 (assumed); 0.175±0.031; 0.1811±0.057
- Spectral type: S
- Absolute magnitude (H): 10.67±0.58 · 10.8 · 11.0 · 11.018±0.002 (R) · 11.1

1737 Severny, provisional designation 1966 TJ, is a stony Eoan asteroid from the outer region of the asteroid belt, approximately 21 kilometers in diameter.

It was discovered on 13 October 1966, by Russian astronomer Lyudmila Chernykh at the Crimean Astrophysical Observatory in Nauchnyj, on the Crimean peninsula, who named after Soviet astronomer Andrei Severny.

== Classification and orbit ==
Severny is a member of the Eos family. It orbits the Sun in the outer main-belt at a distance of 2.9–3.2 AU once every 5 years and 3 months (1,908 days). Its orbit has an eccentricity of 0.05 and an inclination of 9° with respect to the ecliptic. First identified as 1942 CA at Turku, the asteroid's first used observation was made at Heidelberg Observatory in 1950, extending Severny's observation arc by 16 years prior to its official discovery observation.

== Physical characteristics ==
Severny has been characterized as a common stony S-type asteroid.

=== Lightcurves ===
A rotational lightcurve of Severny was obtained by French amateur astronomer Laurent Bernasconi in March 2005. It gave a rotation period of 14.11 hours with a brightness variation of 0.14 magnitude (U=2).

In September 2013, photometric observations in the R-band at the Palomar Transient Factory, California, gave a shorter period of 9.2481 hours with an amplitude of 0.17 magnitude (U=2).

=== Diameter and albedo ===
According to the surveys carried out by the Infrared Astronomical Satellite IRAS, the Japanese Akari satellite, and NASA's Wide-field Infrared Survey Explorer with its subsequent NEOWISE mission, Severny measures between 21.33 and 24.83 kilometers in diameter, and its surface has an albedo between 0.136 and 0.181.

The Collaborative Asteroid Lightcurve Link assumes a standard albedo for Eoan asteroids of 0.14 and calculates a diameter of 21.40 kilometers with an absolute magnitude of 11.1.

== Naming ==
This minor planet was named by the discoverer in honor of Soviet astronomer Andrei Severny (1913–1987), who was the Director of the Crimean Astrophysical Observatory and known for his work on solar flares and astronomical observations from artificial satellites. The official naming citation was published by the Minor Planet Center on 1 October 1969 (M.P.C. 2971).
