= Strmilov =

- Town
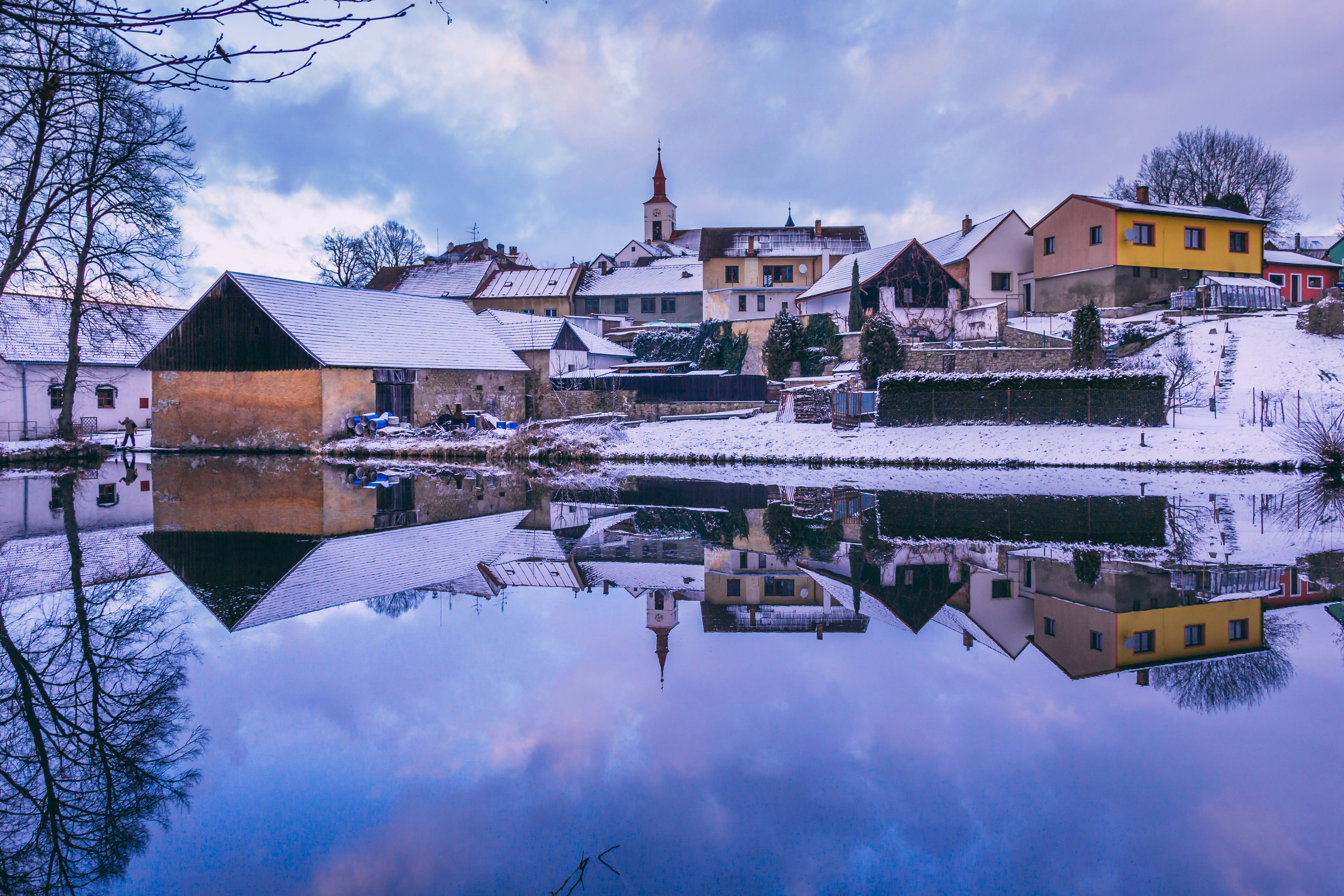
- View from the south

- Flag Coat of arms

- Location in the Czech Republic
- Coordinates: 49°9′52″N 15°12′11″E
- Country: Czech Republic
- Region: South Bohemian
- District: Jindřichův Hradec
- First mentioned: 1255

Government
  - Mayor: Martin Novák

Area
  - Total: 30.61 km^{2} (11.82 sq mi)
- Elevation: 545 m (1,788 ft)

Population (2026-01-01)
  - Total: 1,381
  - Density: 45.12/km^{2} (116.8/sq mi)
- Time zone: UTC+1 (CET)
  - Summer (DST): UTC+2 (CEST)
- Postal code: 378 53
- Website: www.strmilovsko.cz

Strmilov (Czech pronunciation: [ˈstrmɪlof]; German: Tremles) is a town in Jindřichův Hradec District in the South Bohemian Region of the Czech Republic. It has about 1,400 inhabitants.

== Administrative division ==
Strmilov consists of five municipal parts (in brackets population according to the 2021 census):

- Strmilov (1,015)
- Česká Olešná (218)
- Leština (13)
- Malý Jeníkov (54)
- Palupín (70)

== Geography ==
Strmilov is located about 13 kilometres (8 mi) east of Jindřichův Hradec and 56 km (35 mi) northeast of České Budějovice. It lies on the border between the Javořice Highlands, where most of the built-up area is located, and the Křemešník Highlands. The town is situated along the stream Hamerský potok. The built-up area is surrounded by fields and forests with several small fishponds.

Strmilov lies on the border of historical lands of Moravia and Bohemia; the confluence of two brooks near Strmilov is the westernmost point of Moravia.

== History ==
The original settlement was probably established at the beginning of 13th century. The first written mention of Strmilov is from 1255. In 1294, it was already titled as a market village. In 1385, it is referred to as a market town.

After World War II, the German population was expelled according to the Beneš decrees.

== Demographics ==
Historical population

| Year | Pop. | ±% |
|---|---|---|
| 1869 | 3,893 | — |
| 1880 | 3,631 | −6.7% |
| 1890 | 3,378 | −7.0% |
| 1900 | 3,318 | −1.8% |
| 1910 | 3,221 | −2.9% |

| Year | Pop. | ±% |
|---|---|---|
| 1921 | 2,943 | −8.6% |
| 1930 | 2,724 | −7.4% |
| 1950 | 2,082 | −23.6% |
| 1961 | 2,138 | +2.7% |
| 1970 | 1,861 | −13.0% |

| Year | Pop. | ±% |
|---|---|---|
| 1980 | 1,640 | −11.9% |
| 1991 | 1,471 | −10.3% |
| 2001 | 1,522 | +3.5% |
| 2011 | 1,436 | −5.7% |
| 2021 | 1,370 | −4.6% |

Source: Censuses

== Transport ==
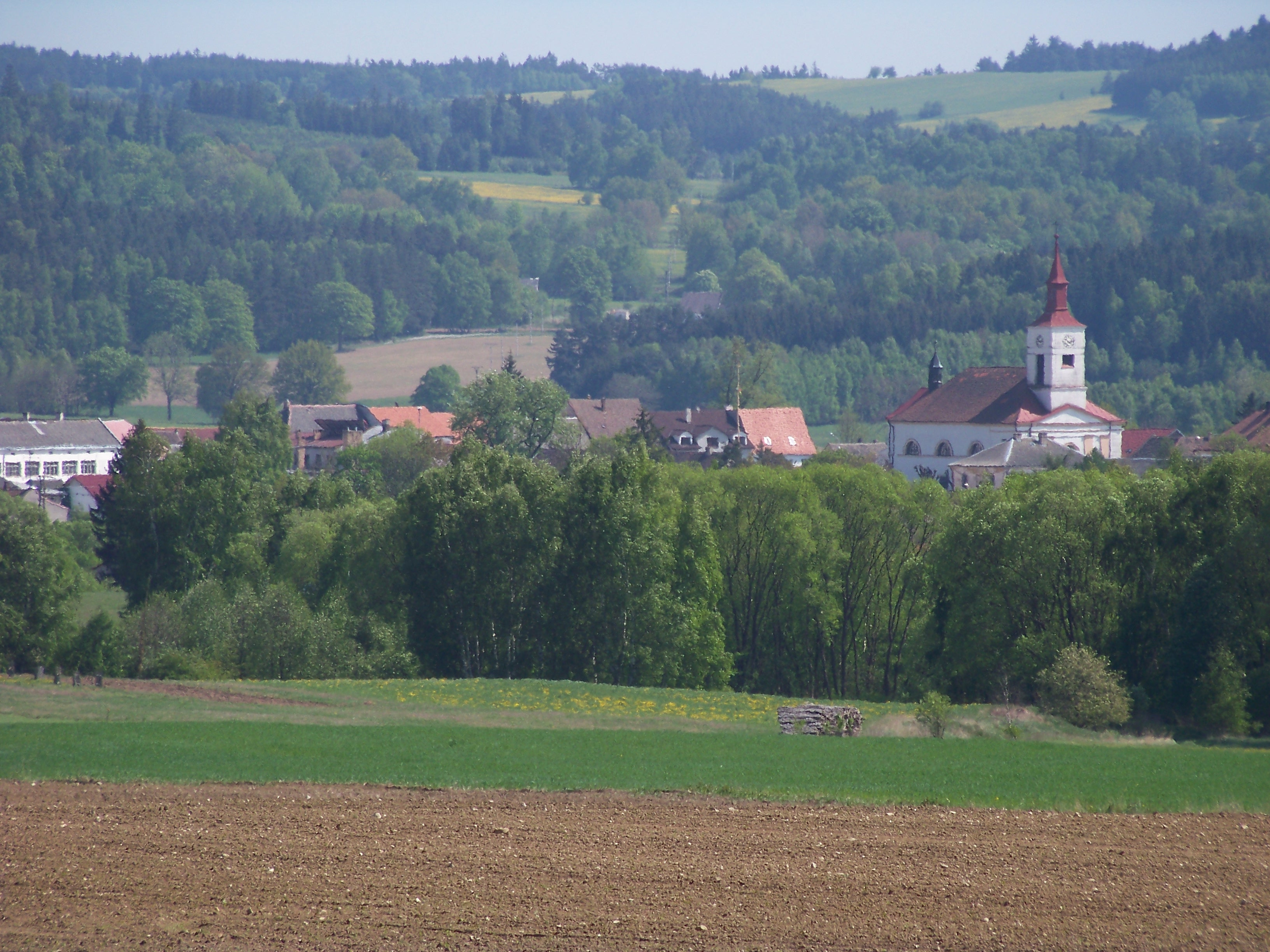
Panorama of Strmilov

The I/23 road (the section from Jindřichův Hradec to Třebíč) runs through the town.

== Sights ==
The main landmark of the town is the Church of Saint Giles. It was built in the Empire style in 1843–1849.

== Twin towns – sister cities ==
Strmilov is twinned with:

- Trubschachen, Switzerland
