= Anton Drasche =

Austrian internist and epidemiologist

- Born: 1 July 1826; Lobendau, Bohemia, Austria
- Died: 23 August 1904 (aged 78); Vöslau, Austria-Hungary
- Scientific career
- Fields: Internal medicine Epidemiology
- Institutions: Rudolfspital

Anton Drasche (1 July 1826 – 23 August 1904) was an Austrian internist and epidemiologist.

== Biography ==
Drasche studied medicine in Prague, Vienna and Leipzig, earning his doctorate in 1853. In Vienna, his instructors included Johann Ritter von Oppolzer, Carl von Rokitansky and Joseph Škoda. In 1858 he was habilitated for special pathology and therapy. and in 1872 was appointed physician-in-chief at the Rudolfspital. On a recommendation from German hygienist Max Pettenkofer, he became an associate professor of epidemiology in 1874.

He is remembered for his studies of epidemic diseases, such as typhoid, bubonic plague, influenza and especially Asiatic cholera. During the cholera epidemic in Vienna (1855), he distinguished himself when taking charge of the cholera section at Allgemeines Krankenhaus. He was also concerned with cardiac and pulmonary diseases, and was at the forefront in the promotion of hygienic measures.

== Selected works ==
- Die epidemische Cholera; eine monographische Arbeit [The cholera epidemic, a monograph]. 1860.
- Ueber die Bedeutung der Commabacillen für die Cholera-Prophylaxe [On the importance of comma bacillus regarding cholera prevention]. Wien. 1885.
- Prof. Dr. Anton Drasche's gesammelte Abhandlungen: Herausgeben von seinen Schülern zu dessen 40 jahrigen Doctor-Jubiläum [Dr. Anton Drasche's collected essays: Edited by his students for his 40 year anniversary]. Wien: J. Šafář. 1893.
