= Severny Urban Settlement =

Severny Urban Settlement is the name of several municipal formations in Russia.

- Severny Urban Settlement, a municipal formation which the settlement of Severny in Belgorodsky District of Belgorod Oblast is incorporated as
- Severny Urban Settlement, a municipal formation which the Work Settlement of Severny in Taldomsky District of Moscow Oblast is incorporated as

== See also ==
- Severny
