= Severny Okrug =

Severny Okrug may refer to:

- Northern Administrative Okrug (Severny administrativny okrug), Moscow, Russia
- Severny Municipal Okrug, Kalininsky District, Saint Petersburg, Russia
- Severny Territorial Okrug, Arkhangelsk, Russia

== See also ==
- Severny District
- Severny (disambiguation)
