= Severny, Velikoustyugsky District, Vologda Oblast =

Severny Северный
- Settlement
- Location within Vologda Oblast Location within Russia
- Coordinates: 60°46′N 46°57′E
- Country: Russia
- Region: Vologda Oblast
- District: Velikoustyugsky District
- Time zone: UTC+3:00

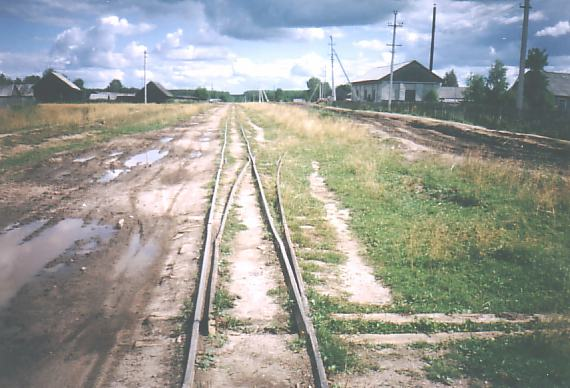

Severny (Russian: Северный) is a rural locality (a settlement) in Susolovskoye Rural Settlement, Velikoustyugsky District, Vologda Oblast, Russia. The population was 464 as of 2002. There are 10 streets.

== Geography ==
Severny is located 63 km east of Veliky Ustyug (the district's administrative centre) by road. Khimzavod is the nearest rural locality.
