= Severnoye, Amur Oblast =

Severnoye Северное
- Selo
- Location within Amur Oblast Location within Russia
- Coordinates: 49°26′N 129°33′E
- Country: Russia
- Region: Amur Oblast
- District: Arkharinsky District
- Time zone: UTC+9:00

Severnoye (Russian: Северное) is a rural locality (a selo) and the administrative center of Severny Selsoviet of Arkharinsky District, Amur Oblast, Russia. The population was 178 as of 2018. There are 6 streets.

== Geography ==
Severnoye is located near the left bank of the Bureya River, 56 km west of Arkhara (the district's administrative centre) by road. Ukrainka is the nearest rural locality.
