= Severnoye, Novosibirsk Oblast =

Rural locality in Novosibirsk Oblast, Russia

Coordinates: 56°20′54″N 78°21′14″E

Flag of Severnoye

Severnoye (Russian: Северное) is a rural locality (a selo) and the administrative center of Severny District, Novosibirsk Oblast, Russia. Population: 5,309 (2010 census); 5,443 (2002 census); 5,398 (1989 Soviet census).

== Climate ==
Climate data for Severnoye (extremes 1936-present)
Month	Jan	Feb	Mar	Apr	May	Jun	Jul	Aug	Sep	Oct	Nov	Dec	Year
Record high °C (°F)	4.0 (39.2)	5.5 (41.9)	14.5 (58.1)	27.7 (81.9)	34.5 (94.1)	35.7 (96.3)	35.1 (95.2)	33.8 (92.8)	30.5 (86.9)	23.0 (73.4)	10.1 (50.2)	3.6 (38.5)	35.7 (96.3)
Mean daily maximum °C (°F)	−13.7 (7.3)	−10.0 (14.0)	−1.7 (28.9)	8.5 (47.3)	18.2 (64.8)	22.9 (73.2)	24.6 (76.3)	21.8 (71.2)	15.3 (59.5)	6.9 (44.4)	−4.5 (23.9)	−11.2 (11.8)	6.4 (43.5)
Daily mean °C (°F)	−18.3 (−0.9)	−15.5 (4.1)	−7.4 (18.7)	2.8 (37.0)	11.0 (51.8)	16.3 (61.3)	18.3 (64.9)	15.4 (59.7)	9.2 (48.6)	2.3 (36.1)	−8.2 (17.2)	−15.4 (4.3)	0.9 (33.6)
Mean daily minimum °C (°F)	−22.7 (−8.9)	−20.5 (−4.9)	−12.8 (9.0)	−2.3 (27.9)	4.6 (40.3)	9.9 (49.8)	12.5 (54.5)	9.8 (49.6)	4.3 (39.7)	−1.4 (29.5)	−11.6 (11.1)	−19.5 (−3.1)	−4.1 (24.5)
Record low °C (°F)	−50.1 (−58.2)	−49.8 (−57.6)	−42.5 (−44.5)	−36.1 (−33.0)	−11.7 (10.9)	−8.5 (16.7)	−0.9 (30.4)	−4.4 (24.1)	−11.3 (11.7)	−32.9 (−27.2)	−51.1 (−60.0)	−52.4 (−62.3)	−52.4 (−62.3)
Average precipitation mm (inches)	22.0 (0.87)	17.5 (0.69)	17.2 (0.68)	27.8 (1.09)	36.8 (1.45)	65.2 (2.57)	82.7 (3.26)	68.7 (2.70)	44.1 (1.74)	39.4 (1.55)	34.9 (1.37)	27.1 (1.07)	483.4 (19.04)
Source: pogoda.ru.net
