= Severny, Altai Krai =

Severny Северный
- Settlement
- Location within Altai Krai Location within Russia
- Coordinates: 53°49′N 83°59′E
- Country: Russia
- Region: Altai Krai
- District: Pervomaysky District
- Time zone: UTC+7:00

Severny (Russian: Северный) is a rural locality (a settlement) and the administrative center of Severny Selsoviet, Pervomaysky District, Altai Krai, Russia. The population was 1,306 as of 2013. There are 28 streets in Severny.

== Geography ==
Severny is located 69 km north of Novoaltaysk (the district's administrative centre) by road. Novokrayushkino is the nearest rural locality.
