= Northern University =

Northern University may refer to:

- Ahmadu Bello University, formerly known as University of Northern Nigeria
- Beijing Jiaotong University, formerly known as Northern Jiaotong University
- Charles Darwin University, formerly known as Northern Territory University
- Joint Matriculation Board, formerly known as Northern Universities Joint Matriculation Board
- Montana State University–Northern
- Northern Arizona University
- Northern Caribbean University, in Jamaica
- Northern Illinois University
- Northern Kentucky University
- Northern Michigan University
- Northern University, Nowshera
- Northern State University, in South Dakota
- Northern University, Bangladesh
- Northern University Games, in Australia
- Northern University, Romania
- Ohio Northern University
- Theological University of Northern Italy – Turin Campus
- Université Lille Nord de France (French: University of Lille North of France)
- Universiti Utara Malaysia (Malay: Northern University of Malaysia)
- University College of Northern Denmark
- University of Northern California, Lorenzo Patiño School of Law
- University of Northern Colorado
- University of Northern Iowa
  - Northern University High School, run by the University of Northern Iowa
- University of Northern Philippines
- University of Northern Virginia

== See also ==
- Northern College (disambiguation)
