= Northern constituency =

Northern constituency may refer to:

- Northern constituency (Dagestan)
- Northern constituency (Saint Petersburg)
- Northern constituency (Zambia)

== See also ==
- Constituency
