= Severny, Republic of Buryatia =

Severny Северный
- Settlement
- Location within Republic of Buryatia Location within Russia
- Coordinates: 54°21′N 113°16′E
- Country: Russia
- Region: Republic of Buryatia
- District: Bauntovsky District
- Time zone: UTC+8:00

Severny (Russian: Северный) is a rural locality (a settlement) in Bauntovsky District, Republic of Buryatia, Russia. The population was 409 as of 2010. There are 11 streets.

== Geography ==
Severny is located 33 km southwest of Bagdarin (the district's administrative centre) by road.
