= Severnaya, Republic of Bashkortostan =

Severnaya Северная
- Village
- Location within Bashkortostan Location within Russia
- Coordinates: 53°36′N 55°38′E
- Country: Russia
- Region: Bashkortostan
- District: Sterlitamaksky District
- Time zone: UTC+5:00

Severnaya (Russian: Северная) is a rural locality (a village) in Oktyabrsky Selsoviet, Sterlitamaksky District, Bashkortostan, Russia. The population was 337 as of 2010. There are 3 streets.

== Geography ==
Severnaya is located 34 km west of Sterlitamak (the district's administrative centre) by road. Oktyabrskoye is the nearest rural locality.
