= Severní =

Northernmost settlement of the Czech Republic

- Village
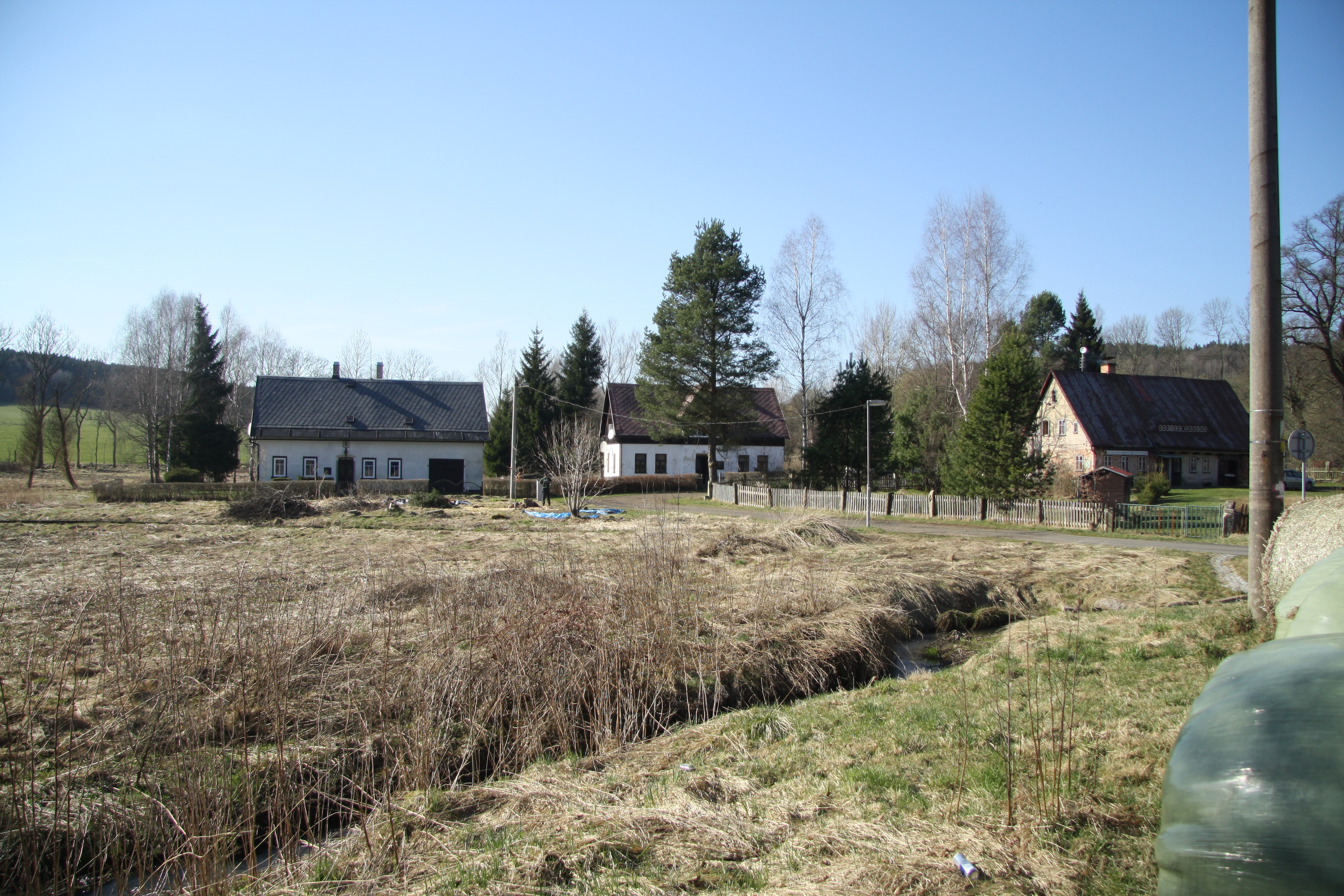
- Houses in Severní

- Location in the Czech Republic
- Coordinates: 51°2′6″N 14°18′56″E
- Country: Czech Republic
- Region: Ústí nad Labem
- District: Děčín
- Municipality: Lobendava
- First mentioned: 1472

Area
  - Total: 8.05 km^{2} (3.11 sq mi)
- Elevation: 358 m (1,175 ft)

Population (2021)
  - Total: 43
  - Density: 5.3/km^{2} (14/sq mi)
- Time zone: UTC+1 (CET)
  - Summer (DST): UTC+2 (CEST)
- Postal code: 407 84

Severní (German: Hilgersdorf) is a village and municipal part of Lobendava in Děčín District in the Ústí nad Labem Region of the Czech Republic.

== Etymology ==
The name literally means 'northern' in Czech.

== Geography ==
Severní is located in the Šluknov Hook region and is the northernmost village of the Czech Republic. A two-tonne stone was unveiled in 2013 marking the most northerly point of the Czech Republic, although it is a metre south of the border.
