= Northern =

Northern may refer to the following:

== Geography ==
- North, a point in direction
- Northern Europe, the northern part or region of Europe
- Northern Highland, a region of Wisconsin, United States
- Northern Province, Sri Lanka
- Northern Range, a range of hills in Trinidad
- Northern State (Sudan), one of the 18 wilayat (states) of Sudan

== Schools ==
- Northern Collegiate Institute and Vocational School (NCIVS), a school in Sarnia, Canada
- Northern Secondary School, Toronto, Canada
- Northern Secondary School (Sturgeon Falls), Ontario, Canada
- Northern University (disambiguation), various institutions
- Northern Guilford High School, a public high school in Greensboro, North Carolina

== Companies ==
- Arriva Rail North, a former train operating company in northern England
- Chemins de fer du Nord (Northern Railway Company), a former rail transport company in northern France
- Nord-Aviation (Northern Aviation), a former state-owned French aircraft manufacturer.
- Compañía de los Caminos de Hierro del Norte de España (Northern Spain Railway Company), a former rail transport company in northern Spain
- Northern Bank, commercial bank in Northern Ireland
- Northern Foods, based in Leeds, England
- Northern Pictures, an Australian-based television production company
- Northern Rail, a former train operating company in northern England
- Northern Railway of Canada, a defunct railway in Ontario
- Northern Records, a Southern California independent record label
- Northern Store, a food and general merchandise store owned and operated by The North West Company
- Northern Television, a New Zealand television production company
- Northern Trains, a train operating company in northern England
- Northern Trust, an international financial services company based in Chicago, Illinois

== Transport ==
- Northern (automobile), an early American car
- Northern line, a London Underground line that runs between North London and South London
- Northern line (Merseyrail), a part of the Merseyrail network
- Northern line (Sri Lanka)
- T9 Northern Line
- Northern Line (Thailand)
- Northern Railway (disambiguation), various railroads
- Northern Explorer, a New Zealand long distance train
- Northern locomotive, a type of (4-8-4) steam locomotive

== Other uses ==
- Bradford Northern, former name of the Bradford Bulls, a British rugby league football club
- Northern cricket team, a domestic cricket team in Pakistan from 2019 to 2023
- Northern (Australian film genre), a sub-genre of the Australian Western
- Northern (genre), a genre of Western films set in Canada or Alaska
- Northern AFC, an association football club based in Dunedin, New Zealand
- Northern (constituency), various districts
- Northern Hotel, a historic hotel in Billings, Montana
- Northern Hotel (Nevada), a former hotel in Ely, Nevada
- Northern pike, fish often called a "northern"

== See also ==
- Nord (disambiguation)
- Nordicity, degree of Northernness
- Norte (disambiguation)
- Northern (disambiguation)
- North (disambiguation)
- Severny (disambiguation)
