= Lobendava =

- Municipality
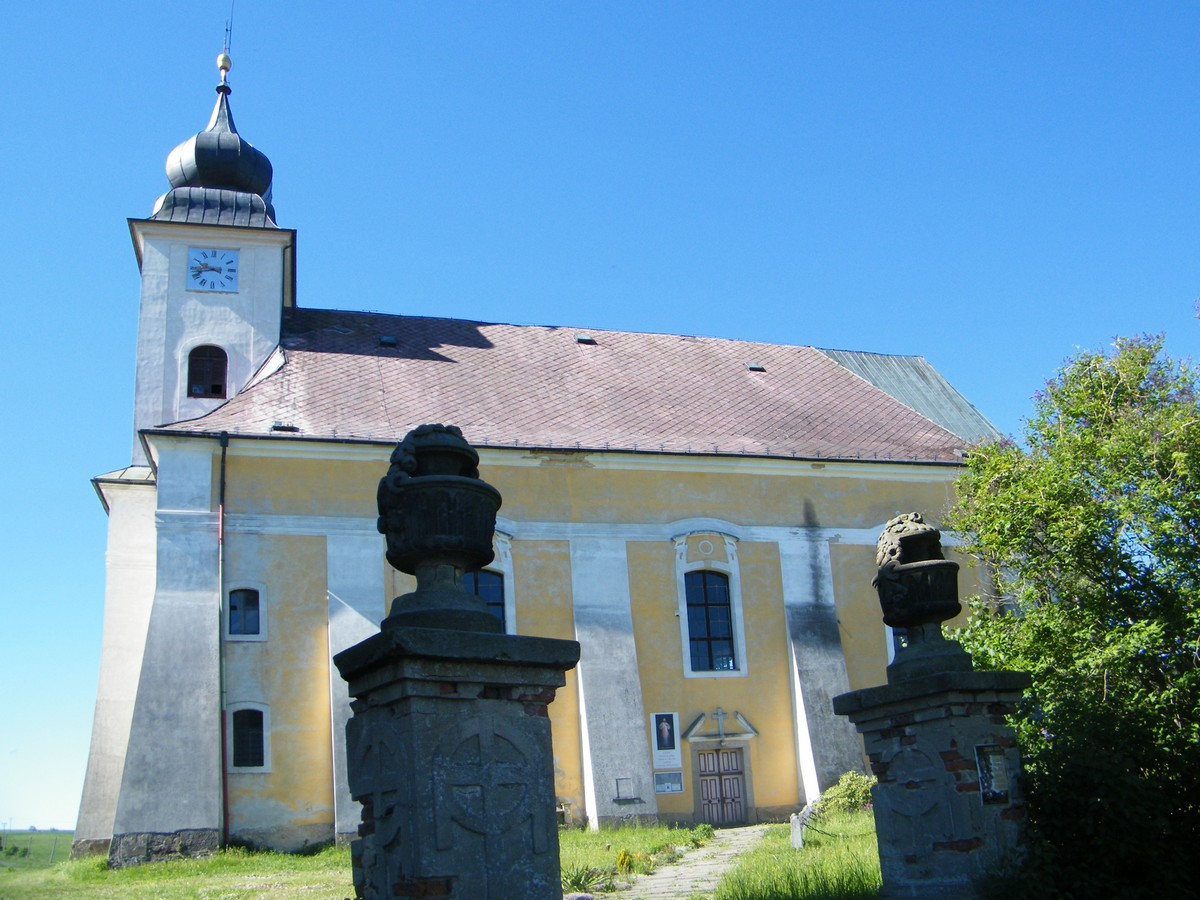
- Church of the Visitation of the Virgin Mary

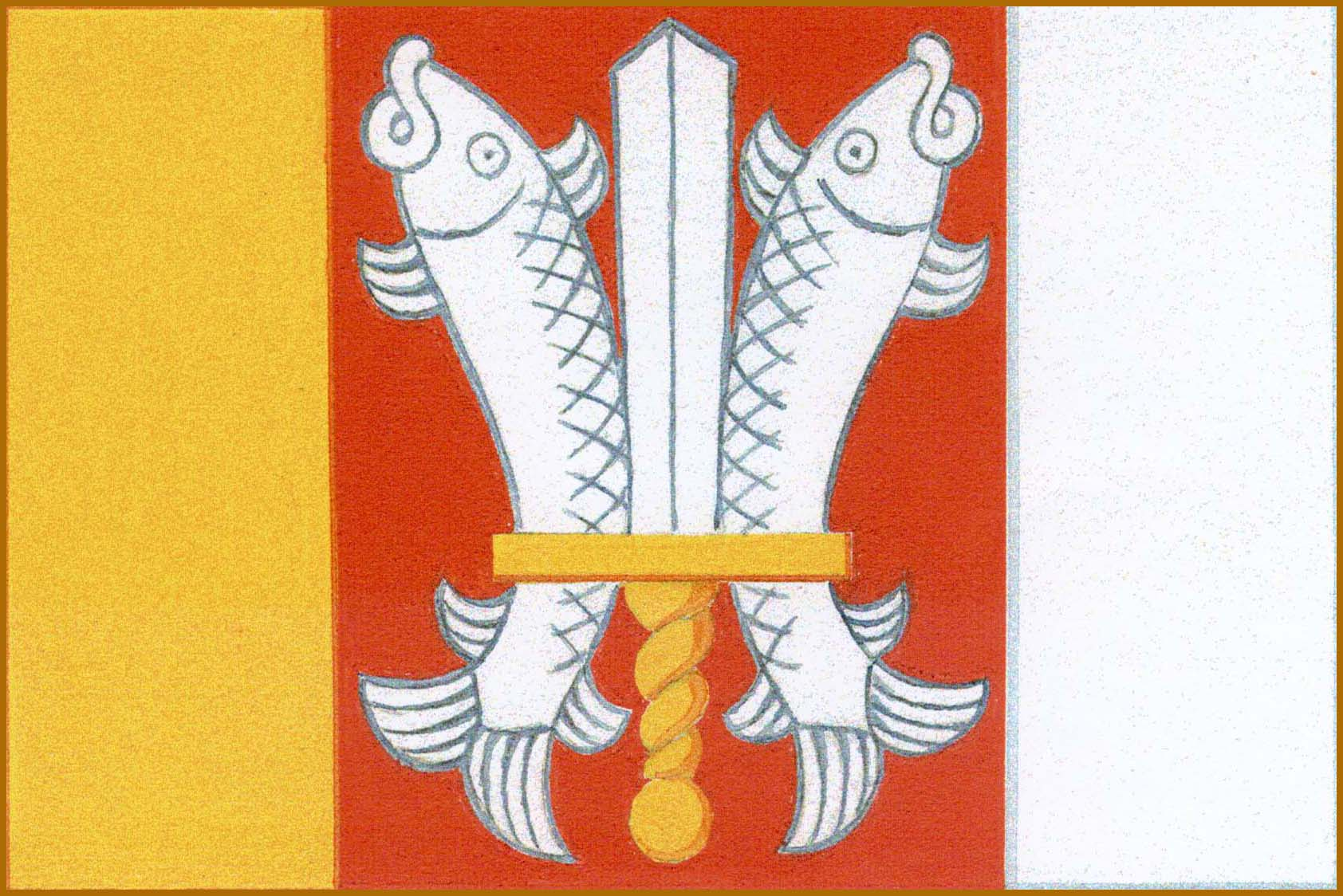
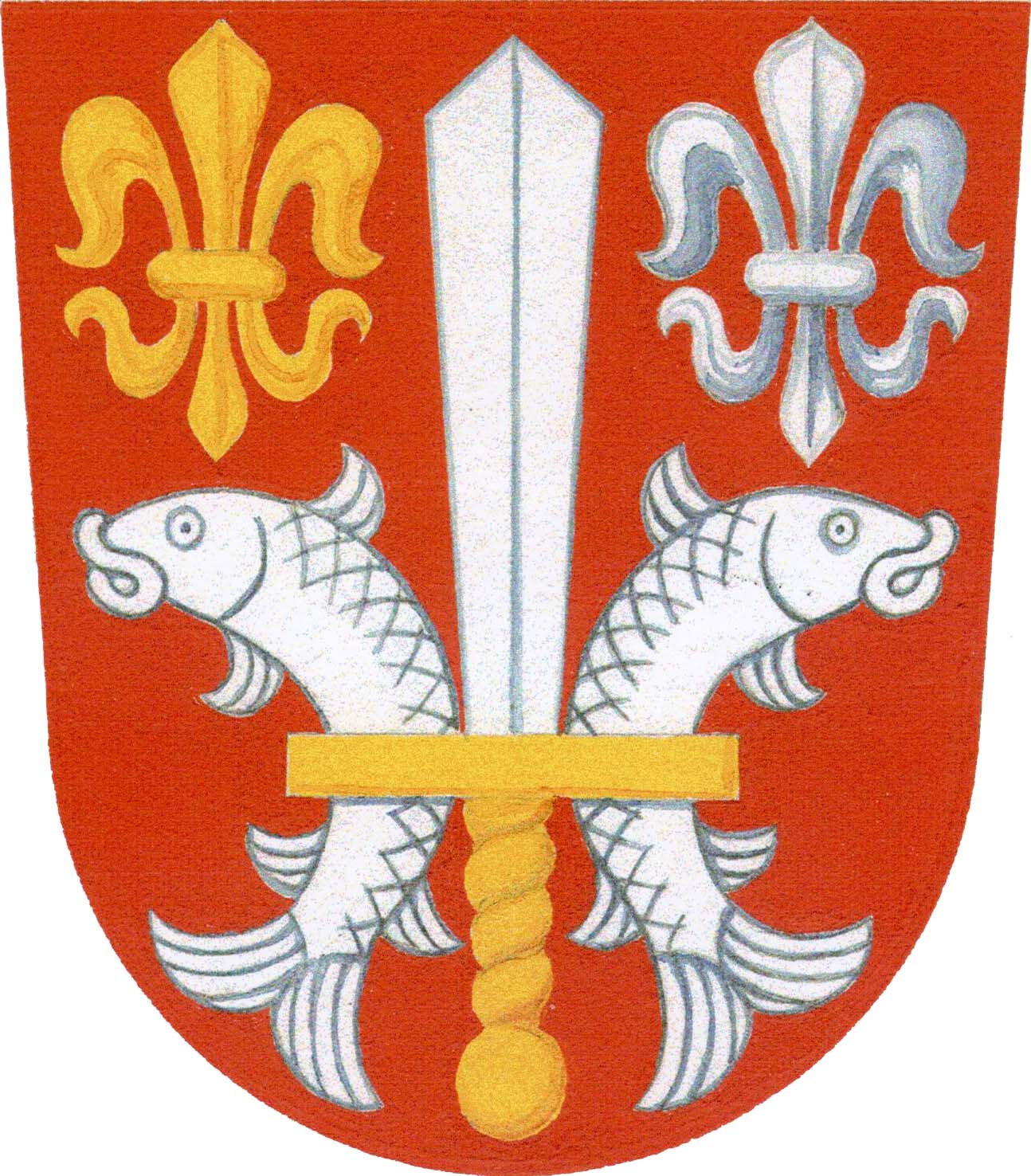
- Flag Coat of arms

- Location in the Czech Republic
- Coordinates: 51°1′10″N 14°18′52″E
- Country: Czech Republic
- Region: Ústí nad Labem
- District: Děčín
- First mentioned: 1449

Area
  - Total: 19.57 km^{2} (7.56 sq mi)
- Elevation: 344 m (1,129 ft)

Population (2026-01-01)
  - Total: 261
  - Density: 13.3/km^{2} (34.5/sq mi)
- Time zone: UTC+1 (CET)
  - Summer (DST): UTC+2 (CEST)
- Postal codes: 407 47, 407 84
- Website: www.obeclobendava.cz

Lobendava (German: Lobendau) is a municipality and village in Děčín District in the Ústí nad Labem Region of the Czech Republic. It has about 300 inhabitants. It is the northernmost municipality of the country.

== Administrative division ==
Lobendava consists of two municipal parts (in brackets population according to the 2021 census):

- Lobendava (225)
- Severní (43)

== Etymology ==
The initial name of the settlement was Lobodov. The name was derived from the Slavic surname Loboda, meaning "Loboda's (court)". The name was then distorted to Lobdov, and during the Germanisation of the region, the village received the German name Lobedau. Another distortion evolved the name to Lobendau, from which the Czech name Lobendava was derived.

== Geography ==
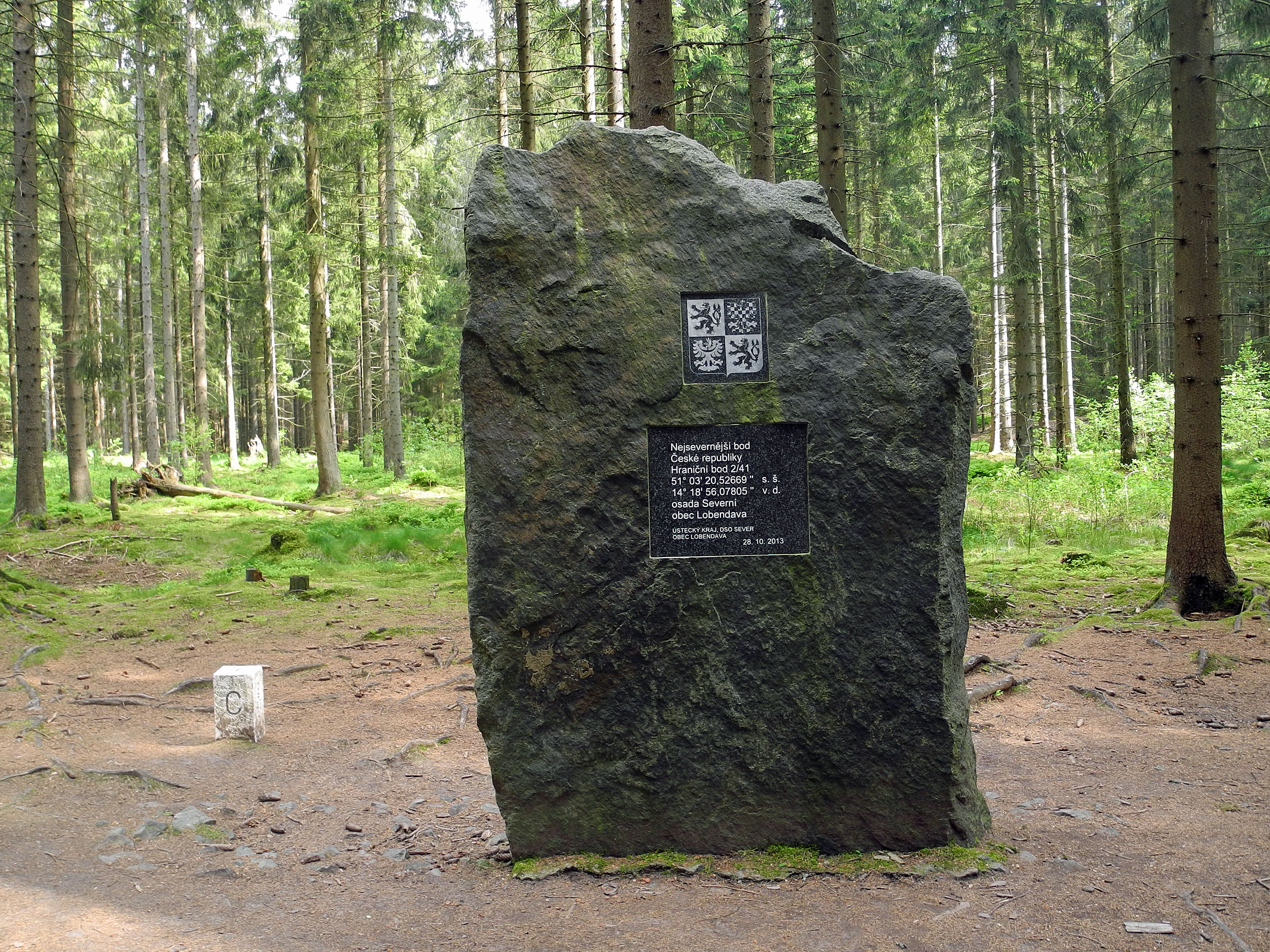
Northernmost point of the Czech Republic

Lobendava is located about 28 kilometres (17 mi) north of Děčín and 44 km (27 mi) northeast of Ústí nad Labem. It lies in the Šluknov Hook area on the border with Germany and is adjacent to the German municipality Neustadt in Sachsen. Lobendava lies in the Lusatian Highlands. The highest point is the hill Buková hora at 512 m (1,680 ft) above sea level.

Lobendava is the northernmost municipality in the Czech Republic. The northernmost point is situated in the area of Severní, at 51°3′20″N 14°18′58″E.

== History ==
The first written mention of Lobendava is from 1449. According to the municipal chronicle, it was founded at the turn of the 12th and 13th centuries, but according to regional historians it could be founded already around 1086. The village was located on the historic Imperial route from Prague to Dresden.

== Demographics ==
Historical population

Year	Pop.	±%
1869	3,072	—
1880	3,222	+4.9%
1890	3,092	−4.0%
1900	3,050	−1.4%
1910	3,257	+6.8%

Year	Pop.	±%
1921	2,971	−8.8%
1930	3,045	+2.5%
1950	701	−77.0%
1961	729	+4.0%
1970	595	−18.4%

Year	Pop.	±%
1980	454	−23.7%
1991	315	−30.6%
2001	333	+5.7%
2011	329	−1.2%
2021	268	−18.5%

Source: Censuses

== Transport ==
There are no railways or major roads passing through the municipality.

== Sights ==
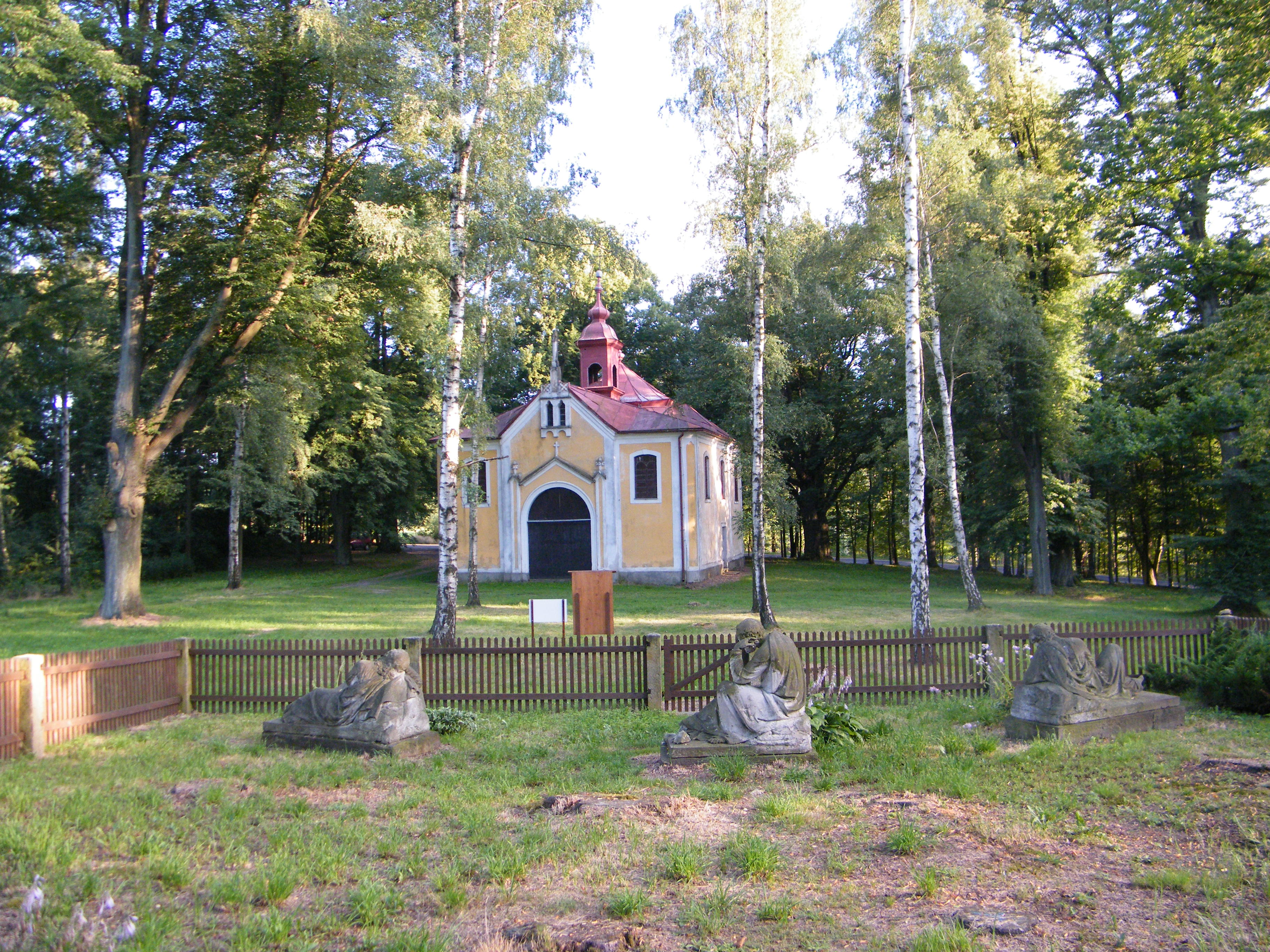
Chapel of Saint Anne

The main landmark of Lobendava is the Church of the Visitation of the Virgin Mary. It was built in the Baroque style in 1709–1712. Next to the church is a Baroque rectory dating from 1767.

On the hill Annaberg stands the Chapel of Saint Anne. It is a Baroque pilgrimage chapel, built in 1775–1777. The Stations of the Cross lead to the chapel.

== Notable people ==
- Anton Drasche (1826–1904), Austrian medical doctor
