= Severnoye, Orenburg Oblast =

Rural locality in Orenburg Oblast, Russia

Severnoye Северное
- Selo
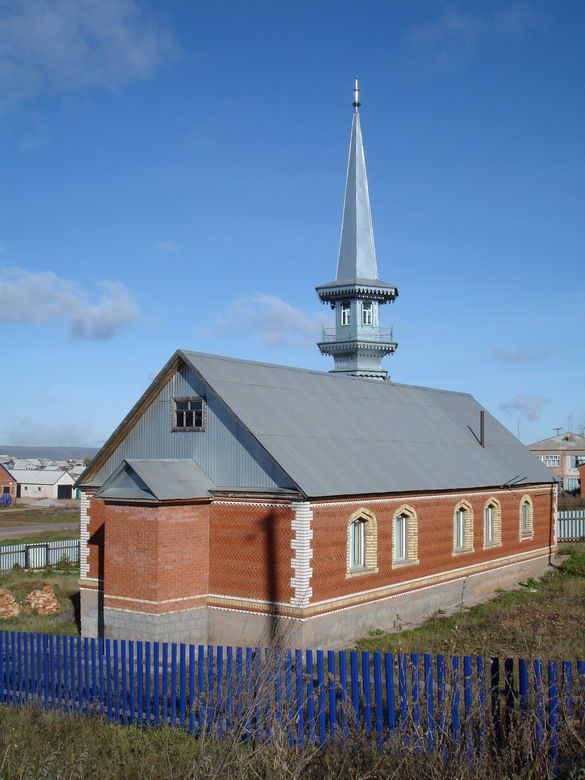
- Severnoye Mosque

- Location within Orenburg Oblast Location within Russia
- Coordinates: 54°05′33″N 52°32′33″E
- Country: Russia
- Region: Orenburg Oblast
- District: Severny District

Population (2010)
  - Total: 4,424
- Time zone: UTC+5:00

Severnoye (Russian: Северное) is a rural locality (a selo) and the administrative center of Severny District, Orenburg Oblast, Russia. Population: 4,424 (2010 census); 4,721 (2002 census); 4,078 (1989 Soviet census).
