= Severny, Svetloyarsky District, Volgograd Oblast =

Severny Северный
- Settlement
- Location within Volgograd Oblast Location within Russia
- Coordinates: 48°19′N 44°04′E
- Country: Russia
- Region: Volgograd Oblast
- District: Svetloyarsky District
- Time zone: UTC+4:00

Severny (Russian: Северный) is a rural locality (a settlement) in Svetloyarsky District, Volgograd Oblast, Russia. The population was 264 as of 2010. There are 10 streets.
