= Severny District, Novosibirsk Oblast =

Severny District Северный район (Russian)
- District
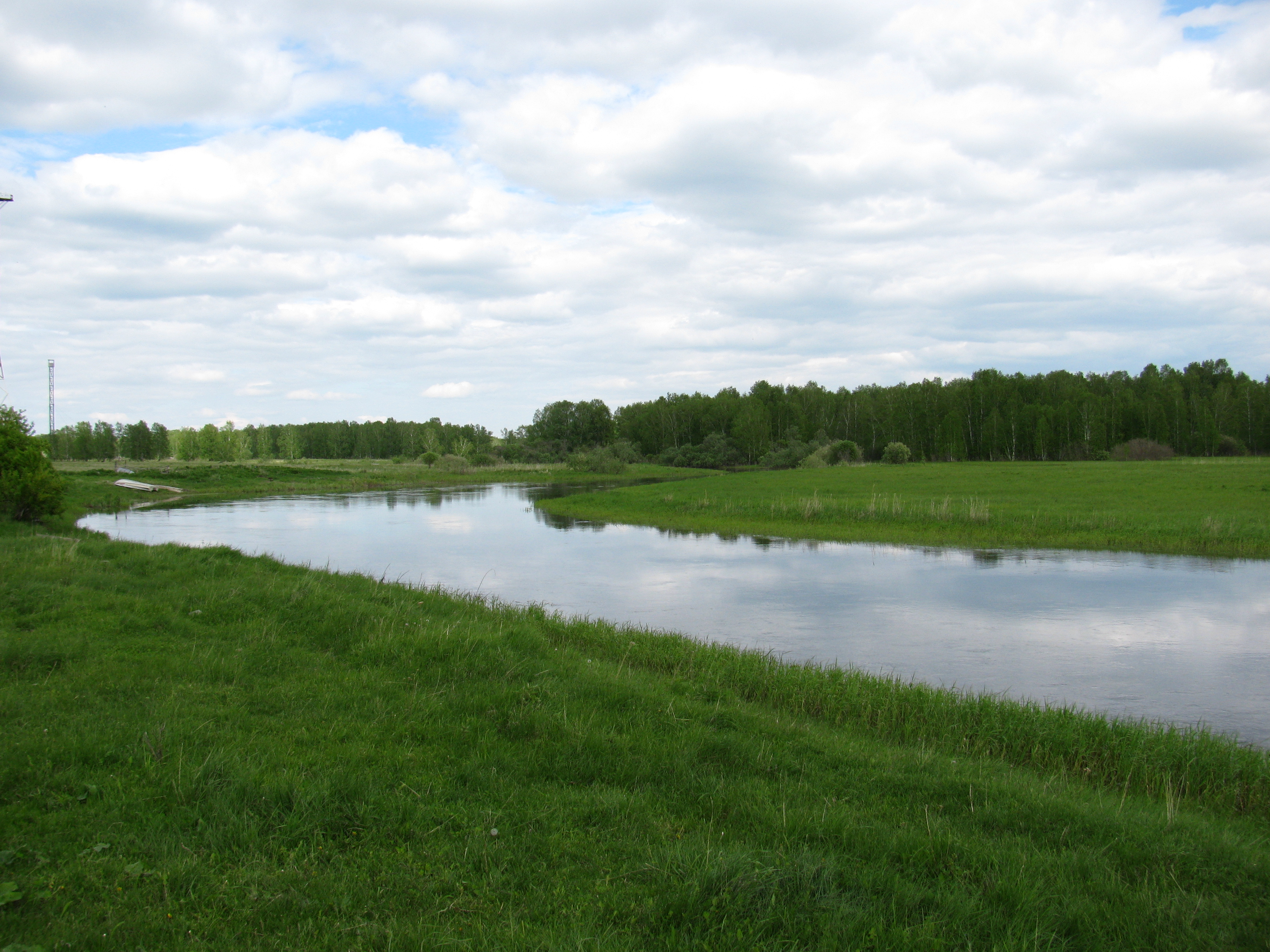
- Icha River, Severny District

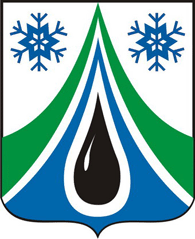
- Flag Coat of arms
- Location of Severny District in Novosibirsk Oblast
- Coordinates: 56°21′N 78°22′E
- Country: Russia
- Federal subject: Novosibirsk Oblast
- Established: 1933
- Administrative center: Severnoye

Area
  - Total: 15,548 km^{2} (6,003 sq mi)

Population (2010 Census)
  - Total: 10,687
  - Density: 0.68736/km^{2} (1.7802/sq mi)
  - Urban: 0%
  - Rural: 100%

Administrative structure
  - Inhabited localities: 32 rural localities

Municipal structure
  - Municipally incorporated as: Severny Municipal District
  - Municipal divisions: 0 urban settlements, 12 rural settlements
- Time zone: UTC+7 (MSK+4)
- OKTMO ID: 50644000
- Website: http://www.severnoe.nso.ru/

Severny District (Russian: Се́верный райо́н) is an administrative and municipal district (raion), one of the thirty in Novosibirsk Oblast, Russia. It is located in the northwest of the oblast. The area of the district is 15,548 square kilometers (6,003 sq mi). Its administrative center is the rural locality (a selo) of Severnoye. Population: 10,687 (2010 Census); 11,835 (2002 census); 12,923 (1989 Soviet census). The population of Severnoye accounts for 49.7% of the district's total population.
