= Andrei Severny (astronomer) =

Soviet astronomer

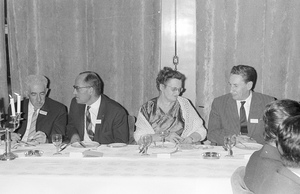
Utrecht Astronomy Symposium 1963. Left to right: Marcel Minnaert, Albrecht Unsöld, Miep Minnaert, Andrei Severny.

Andrei Borisovich Severny (Russian: Андрей Борисович Северный; 11 May 1913, Tula – 3 April 1987, Bakhchysarai Raion) was a Soviet astronomer, particularly known for his work on solar flares and astronomical observations from artificial satellites. He was director of the Crimean Astrophysical Observatory from 1952–1987 and vice-president of the International Astronomical Union from 1964 to 1970.

After World War II, he was assigned to the Crimean Observatory, which was originally based in Simeiz, Crimea, on the Black Sea coast, and was then involved in the construction of a new observer in Naucine, in the Crimean Mountains.

He died on April 3, 1987, and was buried at Kuntsevo Cemetery in Moscow.

== Awards and honors ==
- Stalin Prize, 3rd class (1952)
- Order of the Badge of Honour (1953)
- Two Orders of the Red Banner of Labour (1961, 1963)
- Two Orders of the October Revolution (1971, 1975)
- Hero of Socialist Labour (1973)
- Two Orders of Lenin (1973, 1983)
- USSR State Prize (1984)
