= Severny District, Orenburg Oblast =

Severny District Северный район (Russian)
- District
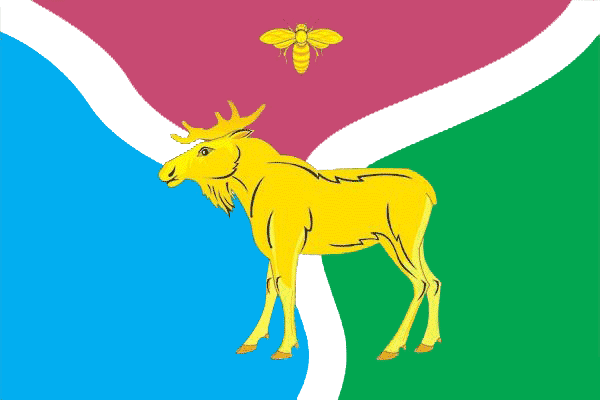
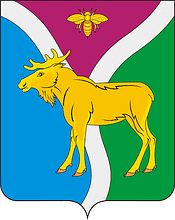
- Flag Coat of arms
- Location of Severny District in Orenburg Oblast
- Coordinates: 54°05′30″N 52°32′34″E
- Country: Russia
- Federal subject: Orenburg Oblast
- Administrative center: Severnoye

Area
  - Total: 2,100 km^{2} (810 sq mi)

Population (2010 Census)
  - Total: 15,012
  - Density: 7.1/km^{2} (19/sq mi)
  - Urban: 0%
  - Rural: 100%

Administrative structure
  - Administrative divisions: 17 Selsoviets
  - Inhabited localities: 71 rural localities

Municipal structure
  - Municipally incorporated as: Severny Municipal District
  - Municipal divisions: 0 urban settlements, 15 rural settlements
- Time zone: UTC+5 (MSK+2)
- OKTMO ID: 53643000
- Website: http://mo-se.orb.ru/

Severny District (Russian: Се́верный райо́н) is an administrative and municipal district, or raion, and is one of the thirty-five raions in Orenburg Oblast, Russia. It is located in the northwest of the oblast. The area of the district is 2,100 square kilometers (810 sq mi). Its administrative center is the rural locality (a selo) of Severnoye. The population is about 15,012 individuals according to the Russian 2010 Census (2010 Census). The population of Severnoye accounts for 29.5% of the total district's population.
