= Koyo =

Koyo may refer to:

- Kōyō, a masculine Japanese given name
- Koyo Electronics Corporation Limited, a Japanese electronics corporation
- Koyo language (disambiguation)
- Koyō, a French music producer
- Koyo (band), an American punk rock band
- 5591 Koyo, a main-belt asteroid
- KOYO-LP, a low-power radio station (107.1 FM) licensed to serve Oroville, California, United States
- Koyö, a French music producer
- Koyo Loans, a UK personal loan lender

== See also ==
- Koyo Seiko, a manufacturer of ball and roller bearings
- Koyo Zom, highest peak in the Hindu Raj range, Pakistan
- Kōyō Gunkan, a record of the military exploits of the Takeda family, Japan
- Hankyū Kōyō Line, a railway line of Hankyu Railway in Hyōgo Prefecture, Japan
- Kōyōen Station, railway station in Nishinomiya, Hyōgo Prefecture, Japan
- Fukushima Prefectural Iwaki Koyo High School, public (prefectural) high school in Iwaki, Fukushima Prefecture, Japan
- Koyo Gakuin High School, private junior and senior high schools for boys
- Fukuoka Prefectural Asakura Koyo High School, public (prefectural) in Asakura, Fukuoka Prefecture, Japan
- Koyo High School, private high school in Ōmura, Nagasaki Prefecture, Japan
- Kyoto Prefectural Koyo High School, public (prefectural) high school in Mukō, Kyoto, Japan
- Miyagi Prefecture Kesennuma Koyo High School, public (prefectural) in Kesennuma, Miyagi Prefecture, Japan
- Nagoya Koyo Senior High School, public (municipal) high school in Nagoya, Aichi Prefecture, Japan
- Okayama Prefectural Koyo High School in Okayama, Okayama Prefecture, Japan
- Okinawa Prefectural High School, public (prefectural) high school in Yaese, Okinawa Prefecture, Japan
- Wakayama Koyo High School, public (prefectural) high school in Wakayama, Wakayama Prefecture, Japan
