= DirectLOGIC =

Line of programmable logic controllers

DirectLOGIC is a range of programmable logic controllers produced by Koyo.

They are programmed using DirectSOFT via:

- RS-232
- USB port with USB-to-Serial adapter
- 10BASE-T or 10/100 Ethernet network card

== Models ==
- DL05 Micro PLC
- DL06 Micro Modular PLC
- DL105 Fixed I/O (brick) PLC
- DL205 Modular PLC
- DL305 Legacy PLC, compatible with the General Electric Series One, the Texas Instruments Series 305, and the Siemens SIMATIC TI305.
- DL405 Specialty PLC

== See also ==
- SCADA
