= S7 =

S7 or S-7 may refer to:

== Electronics and software ==
- Acer Aspire S7, a laptop
- Samsung Galaxy S7, a smartphone
- Samsung Galaxy Tab S7, a tablet computer
- Simatic S7 PLC, an automation system based on Programmable Logic Controller from Siemens, successor to Simatic S5 PLC
- SPARC S7, a computer processor using the SPARC instruction set
- Sub7, a computer backdoor

== Media ==
- Sovereign Seven, a superhero team and comic book published by DC Comics in 1995–1998
- Samurai 7, a 2004 anime series

== Science and technology ==
- 7-sphere (S^{7}), an n-sphere
- Heptasulfur (S_{7}), a cyclic allotrope of sulfur
- S7 or S-7, a grade of tool steel
- S7: Keep container tightly closed, a safety phrase in chemistry

== Transportation ==
=== Air ===
- Ambrosini S.7, an Italian racing aircraft flown before World War II
- Rans S-7 Courier, a light aircraft
- S7 Airlines, a Russian commercial airline, its IATA Airlines code is also S7

=== Automobiles ===
- Audi S7, a German executive sports sedan
- BYD S7, a Chinese mid-size SUV formerly known as S6
- Forthing Xinghai S7, a Chinese electric full-size sedan
- Haima S7, a Chinese compact SUV
- Huansu S7, a Chinese mid-size SUV
- JAC Refine S7, a Chinese mid-size SUV
- Saleen S7, an American supercar
- Trumpchi Xiangwang S7, a Chinese mid-size crossover SUV

=== Motorcycles ===
- Sunbeam S7, a British motorcycle

=== Rail ===
==== Trains ====
- London Underground S7 Stock, a type of train on London Underground, England
- Prussian S 7, a Prussian steam locomotives class

==== Lines ====
- S7 (Vienna), an S-Bahn line in Austria
- S7 (Berlin), an S-Bahn line in Germany
- S7 (Munich), an S-Bahn line in Germany
- S7 (Rhine-Main S-Bahn), a line in Germany
- S7 (Rhine-Ruhr S-Bahn), a line in Germany
- S7 (St. Gallen S-Bahn), a cross-border line in Switzerland, Austria and Germany
- S7 (ZVV), a Zurich S-Bahn line in the cantons of St. Gallen and Zurich, Switzerland
- S7, a line of Lucerne S-Bahn in the cantons of Bern and Lucerne, Switzerland
- S7, a line of Styria S-Bahn in Austria
- S7, a cross-border line of Tyrol S-Bahn in Austria and Germany
- Capital Airport–Daxing Airport intercity railway, or Line S7, Beijing, China
- Line S7 (Milan suburban railway service), Italy
- Line S7 (Nanjing Metro), China

=== Roads and routes ===
- County Route S7 (California)
- Expressway S7 (Poland)
- S7 Shanghai–Chongming Expressway
- Jinxiong Expressway, where its Tianjin section is numberred S7

=== Watercraft ===
- HMS Sealion (S07), a 1959 British Porpoise-class submarine
- USS S-7 (SS-112), a 1920 S-class submarine of the United States Navy

== Other uses ==
- S7 (classification), a disability swimming classification
- S7 postcode, a postcode covering areas of southern Sheffield, England
- British NVC community S7, a swamps and tall-herb fens community in the British National Vegetation Classification system

== See also ==
- 7S (disambiguation)
