= Sevens =

Sevens may refer to:

== Music ==
- Sevens (album), a 1997 album by Garth Brooks
- Sevens (band), a band on the ATIC Records label
- Sevens (Brandon Lake song), a 2025 song by Brandon Lake

== Sport ==
- Rugby sevens, a variant of rugby union football
- Rugby league sevens, a variant of rugby league football
- The Sevens Stadium, a rugby stadium in Dubai, United Arab Emirates
- The nickname of the Delaware 87ers, an American professional basketball team in the NBA G League
- Sevens (variation of football), a variant of football

== Other ==
- Sevens (film), a 2011 Indian film
- Sevens (card game)
- Sevens (dance group), from North Macedonia
- Sevens (Enneagram of Personality), model of personality types
- Seven Buildings, formerly located in Washington, D.C.
- Colloquial name for the Sevens Ale House, Boston, United States
- Yu-Gi-Oh! Sevens, a 2020 anime series

== See also ==
- 7 (disambiguation)
- 7S (disambiguation)
