= 7S =

7S, 7s, or 7's may refer to:

- Ryan Air Services (IATA code)
- McKinsey 7S Framework, a management model
- Rugby sevens, the seven-a-side version of rugby union
- Canon EOS 7s, a 2004 35 mm film single-lens reflex camera
- 7s, a 2023 album by Avey Tare

== See also ==
- S7 (disambiguation)
- Sevens (disambiguation)
