= Koyo language =

Koyo may be,

- Koyo language (Sudan) (Lokoya)
- Koyo language (Congo) (Ekoyo)
