= Koyo Electronics Corporation Limited =

Koyo Electronics Co., Ltd. (Koyo Denki, Co., Ltd.)
- Native name: 光洋電器株式会社
- Romanized name: Kōyō Denki, K.K.
- Founded: 1955 in Tokyo
- Products: Portable radios
- Subsidiaries: Koyo Electronics Industry

Koyo Electronics Industry Co., Ltd.
- Native name: 光洋電子工業株式会社
- Romanized name: Kōyō Denshi Kōgyō, K.K.
- Founded: March 18, 1959 in Tokyo
- Headquarters: Tenjin-cho, Kodaira, Tokyo
- Products: Electronic control devices, imaging devices, automotive devices, factory automation control systems
- Website: koyoele.co.jp/english/

Koyo Electronics (Kōyō Denki) and its subsidiary Koyo Electronics Industry (Kōyō Denshi Kōgyō), often collectively referred to as just Koyo, are Japanese electronics companies based in Kodaira, Tokyo that manufactured radios from 1955 until 1973, and now its subsidiary manufactures industrial electronics devices and factory automation control systems.

Their first product was a vacuum tube radio released in 1955, and their first transistor radio was the KR-6TS-1 radio released in the spring of 1957 at the price of 14,000 yen. Through the 1960s, Koyo had manufactured and sold millions of portable transistor radios, particularly, their best-selling model KTR-624 had been shipped over one million units in ten years since its release in 1961. Their several models had been sold under other brands, and also supplied to other manufacturers including Philco, Grundig, etc.

In August 1973, they ceased manufacture of audio products including radio receivers and record players.

== See also ==
- DirectLOGIC

== Gallery ==
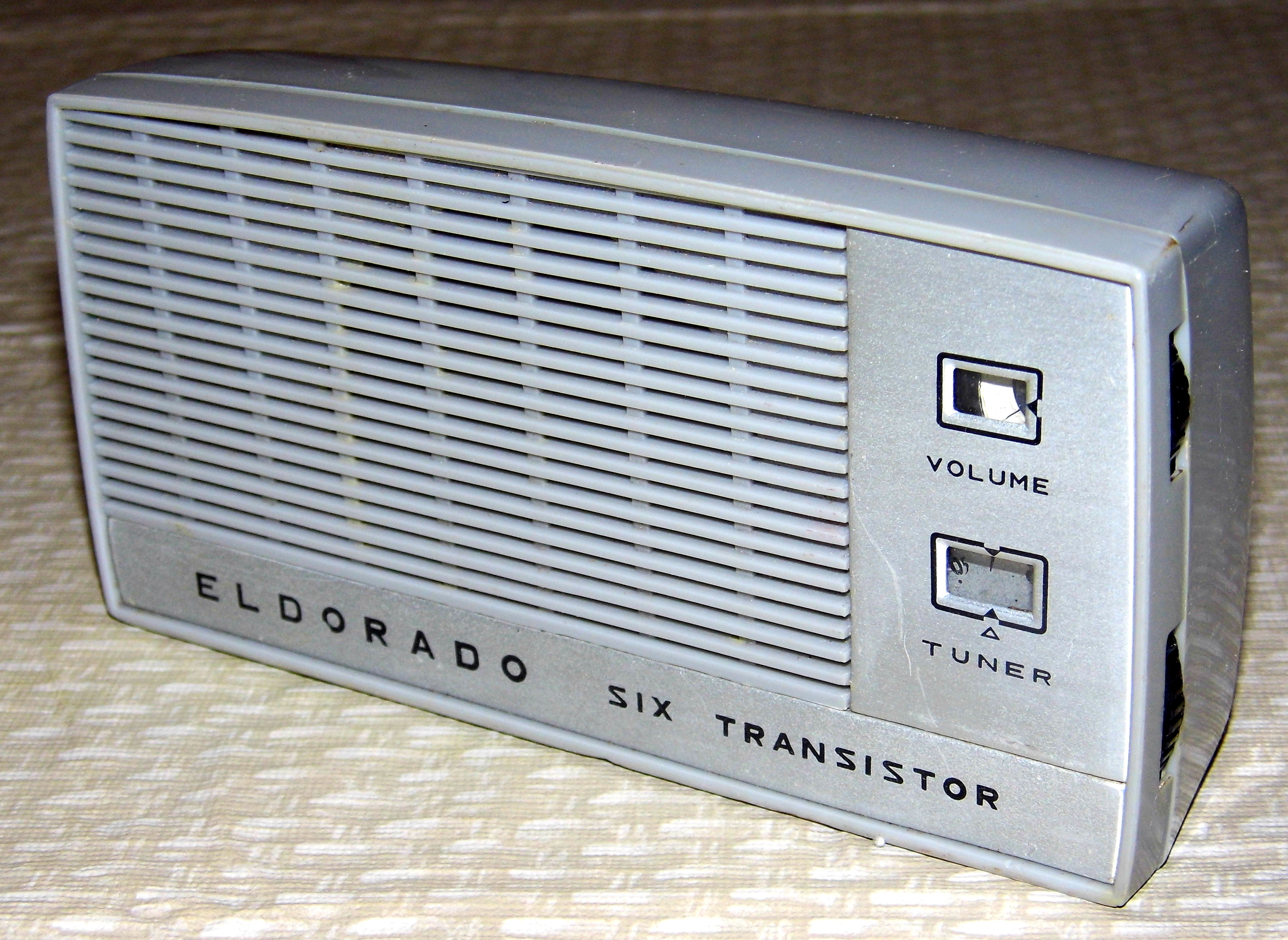
Koyo KR-6TS-2 (1959) under Eldorado brand

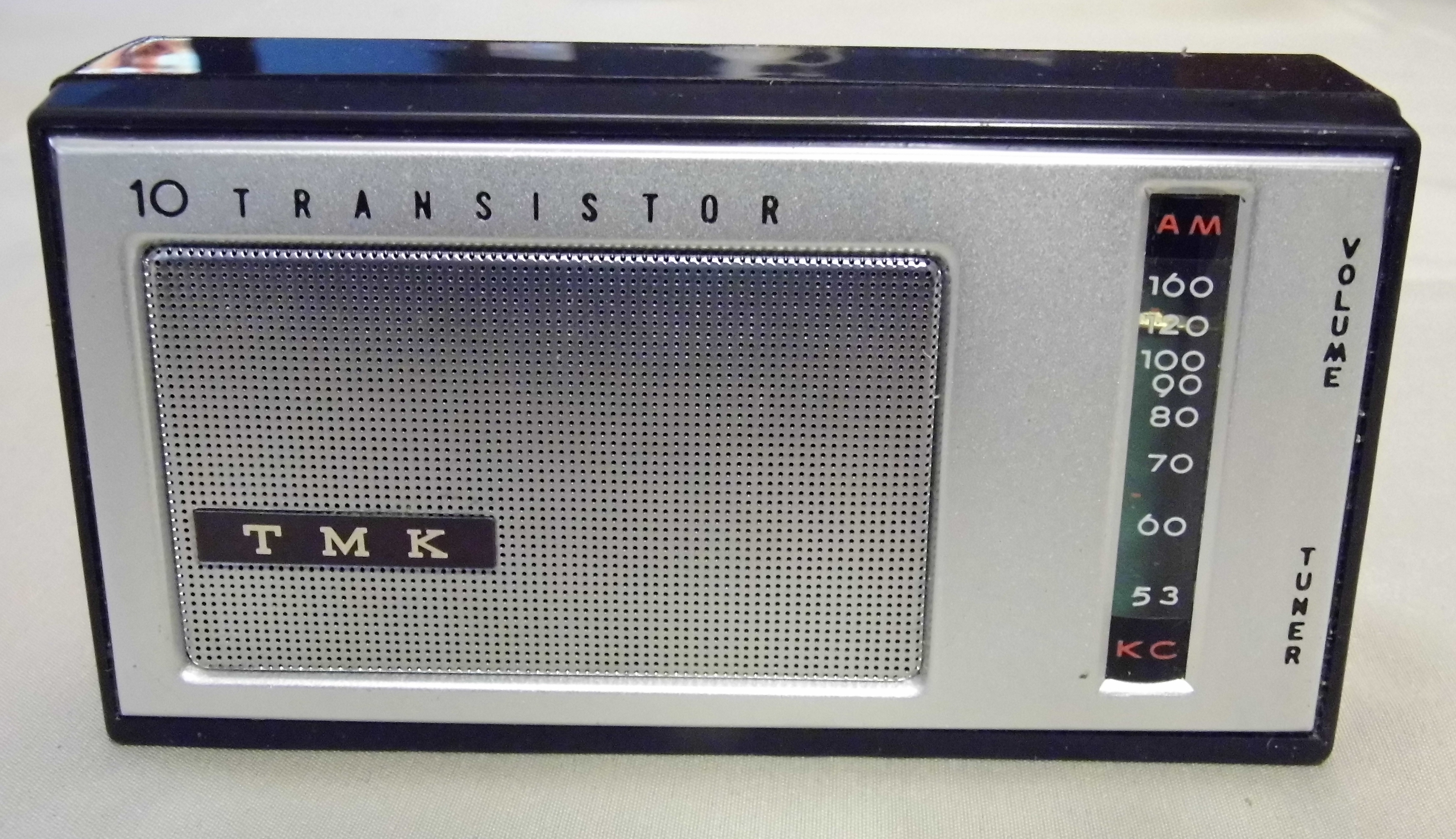
Koyo KTR-624 (1961) under TMK brand (Toyomenka America)

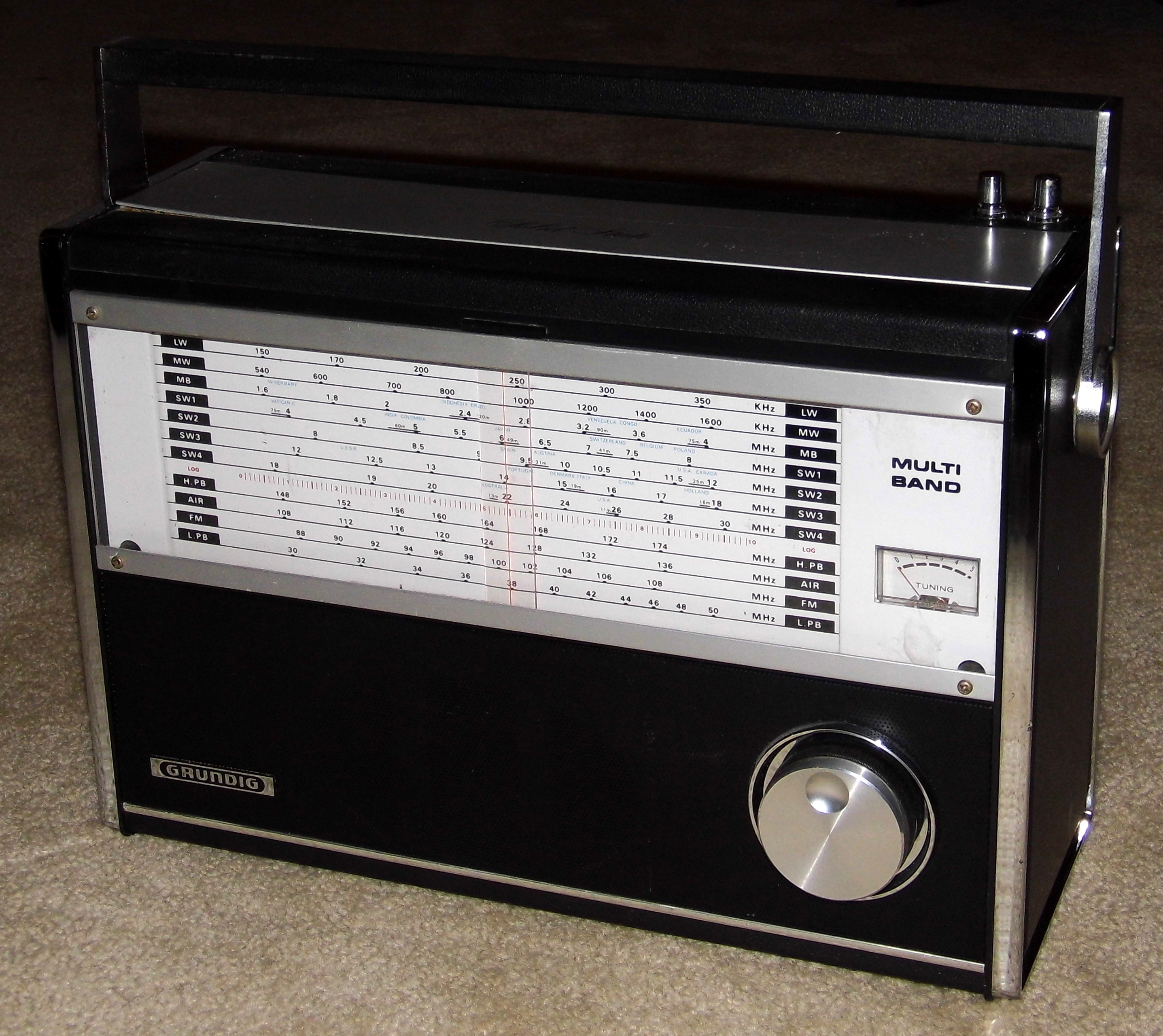
Koyo KTR-1770 (1970) 11-Band Radio sold as Grundig TR-807
