= Sevens (dance group) =

Sevens is a dance group from Kicevo, North Macedonia, created by Ariana Xhambazi. The group originally had seven girls, but the number of dancers in the group has changed over time. The group currently comprises Lana, Tole, Buli, Bona, and Shype.

In 2006 the group saw their first big success, winning Best Group in the Fest Dituria festival. Soon they were invited to perform at other concerts and festivals.

On 9 May 2008 they won the 3rd place in Balkans for dancing in RinFest 2008 - Montenegro
