= Simatic =

Series of programmable logic controllers

SIMATIC is a series of programmable logic controller and automation systems, developed by Siemens. Introduced in 1958, the series has gone through four major generations, the latest being the SIMATIC S7 generation. The series is intended for industrial automation and production.

The name SIMATIC is a registered trademark of Siemens. It is a portmanteau of "Siemens" and "Automatic".

== Function ==
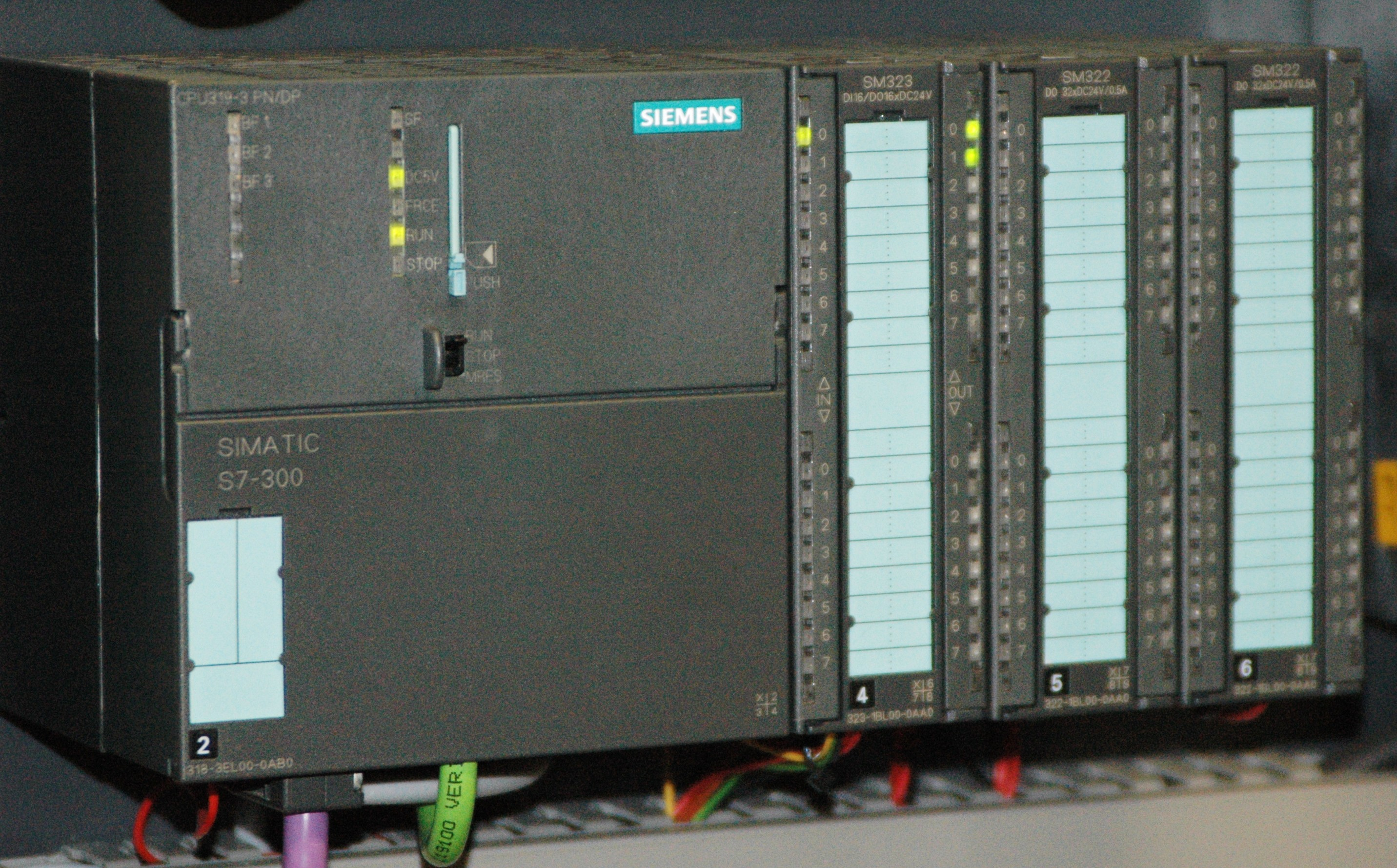
Siemens SIMATIC S7-300 PLC CPU with three I/O modules attached

As with other programmable logic controllers, SIMATIC devices are intended to separate the control of a machine from the machine's direct operation, in a more lightweight and versatile manner than controls hard-wired for a specific machine. Early SIMATIC devices were transistor-based, intended to replace relays attached and customized to a specific machine. Microprocessors were introduced in 1973, allowing programs similar to those on general-purpose digital computers to be stored and used for machine control. SIMATIC devices have input and output modules to connect with controlled machines. The programs on the SIMATIC devices respond in real time to inputs from sensors on the controlled machines, and send output signals to actuators on the machines that direct their subsequent operation.

Depending on the device and its connection modules, signals may be a simple binary value ("high" or "low") or more complex. More complex inputs, outputs, and calculations were also supported as the SIMATIC line developed. For example, the SIMATIC 505 could handle floating point quantities and trigonometric functions.

== History ==
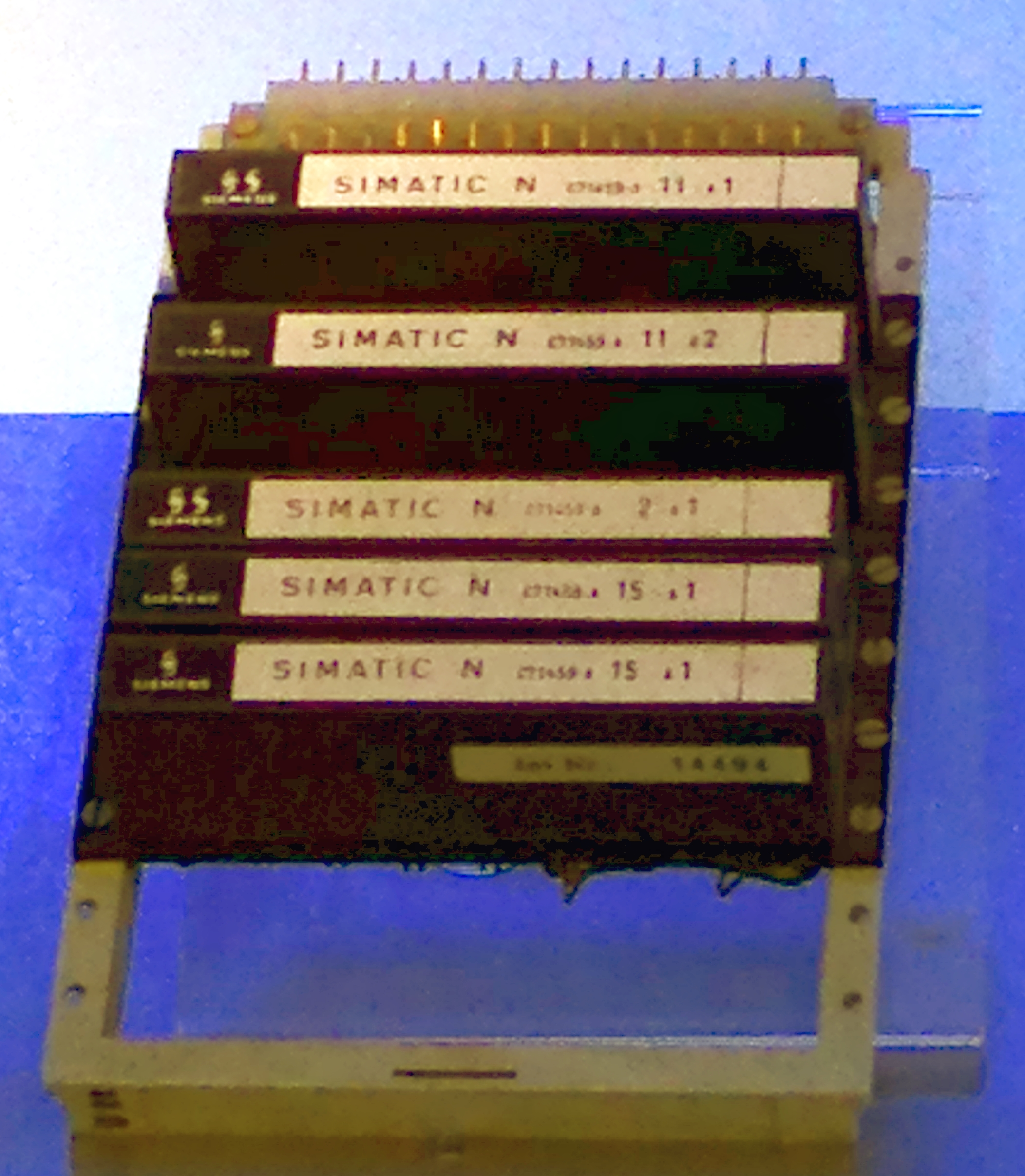
Siemens Simatic N

On April 2, 1958 the name Simatic (composed of "Siemens" and "Automatic") was registered with the German Patent and Trademark Office (DIN) as a registered trademark of the company Siemens.

A year later, in 1959, the Simatic G was launched on the market, a system that could replace relay logic with a hard-wired programmed logic controller (based on the use of germanium transistors). The system was launched under the name "Building-Block System for Solid-State Controls".

In 1964, the Simatic N (1964) was launched (hard-wired programmed logic controller) - based on Silicon transistors.

In 1973, the Simatic S3 was launched, the first microprocessor-based Simatic system that implemented programmable logic.

In 1979, the Simatic S5 series was launched, a series that was maintained until 2000. Automation systems based on Simatic S5 are still functional worldwide. S5 systems were programmed using the STEP 5 software system. In 1984 the Simatic S5 U (universal) programmable controller series is introduced.

In 1994, the Simatic S7 series was launched, a series based mainly on the S7-200 controllers (dedicated to simple automation systems), S7-300 (suitable for almost any automation system) and S7-400 (dedicated to large and very large automation projects). All controllers in these series allow networking, especially in Profibus or Industrial Ethernet networks.

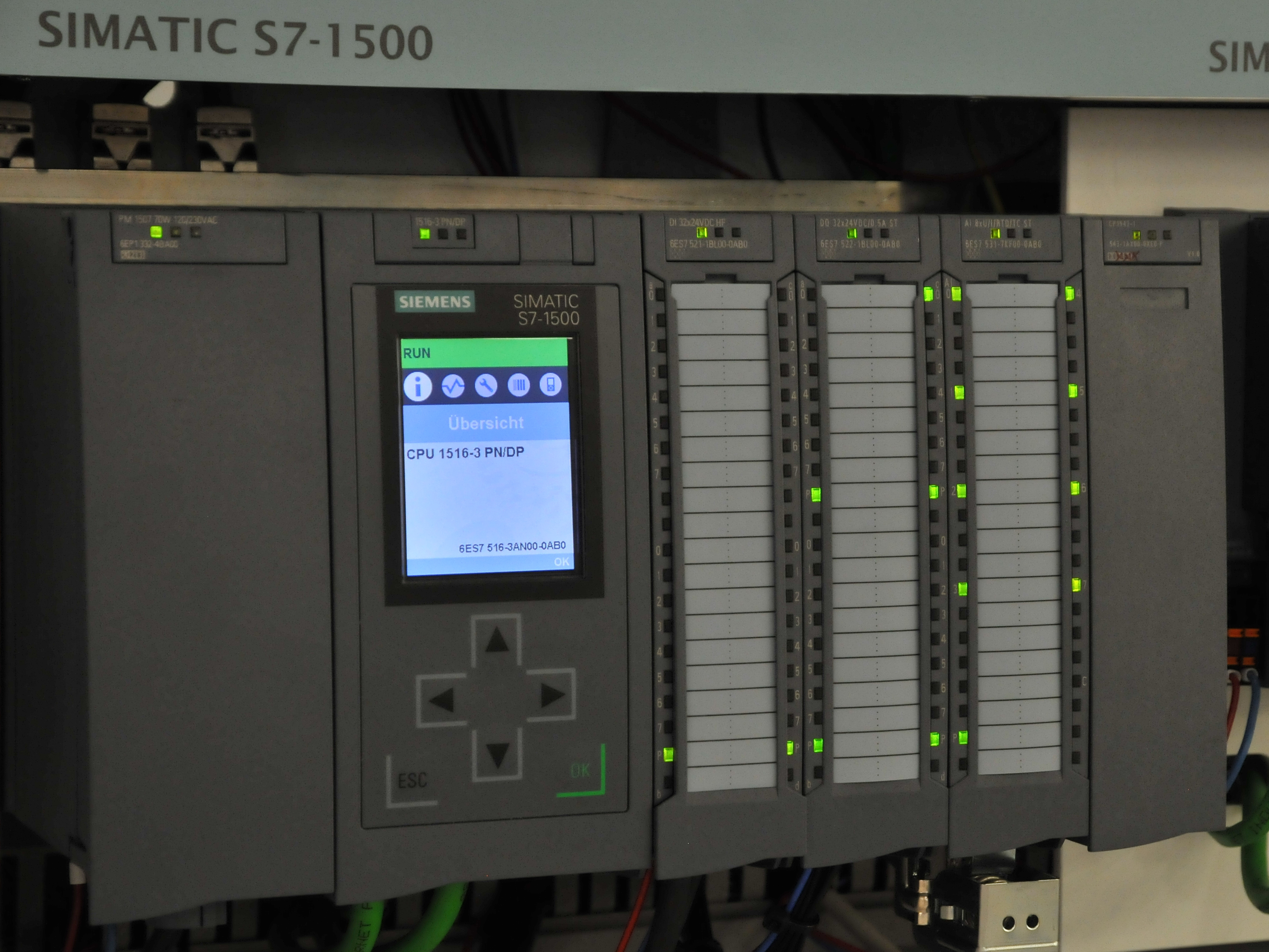
Siemens Simatic S7-1500

In 1996 Siemens presented the concept of "Totally Integrated Automation", initially a concept referring to the interconnectivity of automation equipment.

In 2009, the S7-1200 series of PLCs was launched, a series that replaced the S7-200 series.

In 2011, the TIA Portal (Totally Integrated Automation Portal) software package was also launched, a software platform dedicated to the complex programming of automation systems.

In 2013, the S7-1500 series appeared on the market, a new generation of programmable logic controllers intended to replace the S7-300 and S7-400 series over time.

S7-1200 G2, a second generation of the S7-1200, was launched in December 2024.

== Controllers ==
SIMATIC control systems (PLC) are designed to automate as much of the control of industrial plants as possible. Through the system inputs and outputs, it can monitor and control process elements (operation flow, mechanical element status, temperature, pressure) reducing the need for continuous supervision by a human operator.

The operating logic is stored in the form of a software program in the memory of a Central Processing Unit-type control system. The automation system is modular and, in addition to the CPU, can be equipped with various digital and/or analog peripheral modules, as well as intelligent control modules. The modules can be configured centrally (mounted in close proximity to the CPU unit) or decentralized, close to the controlled plant. The range of controllers extends from small, compact controllers to high-performance PLC systems. What all Simatic controllers have in common is their robustness against electromagnetic interference (e.g. Simatic-S7 complies with the requirements of Directive 2014/30/EU on electromagnetic compatibility and climatic stress - e.g. 0 to + 60 °C ambient temperature during operation). Simatic is programmed using STEP 7 (formerly STEP 5) programming software or software from third-party manufacturers.

Siemens has developed more product lines to date. First versions were hard-wired, the first processor based series being SIMATIC S3

=== SIMATIC S3 ===
(starting from 1973)

S3 was based on hard-wired logic SIMATIC C3.

- Example: Simatic S3-111

=== Simatic S5 ===
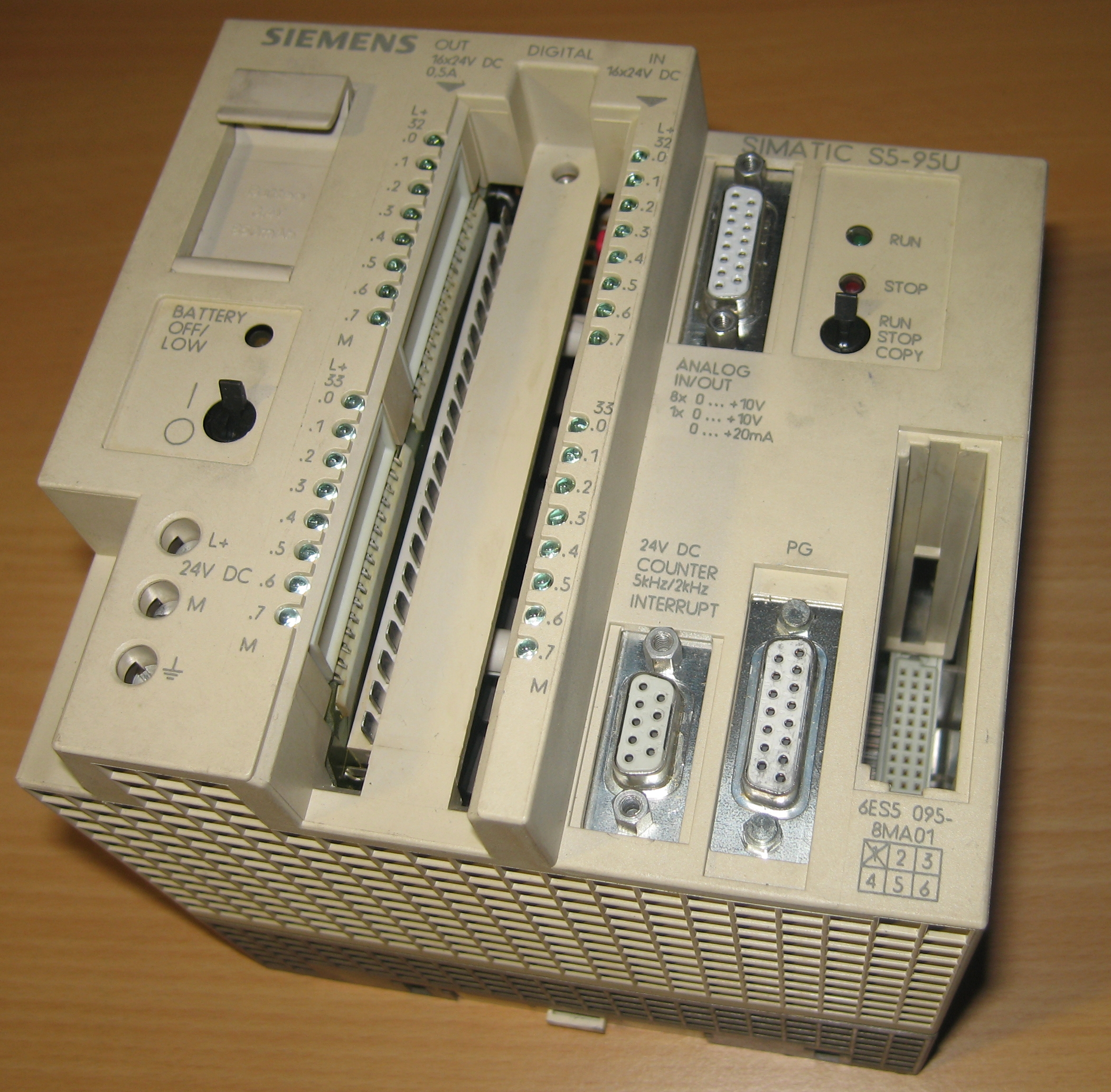
Siemens S5-95U-CPU

(1979 - 2000)

The S5 line was sold in various chassis configurations. Within each chassis style, several CPUs were available, with varying speed, memory, and capabilities. Some systems provided "fail-safe" control, used for safety applications or redundant CPU operation for ultra-high-reliability control, as used in pharmaceutical manufacturing, for example.

Each configuration was built starting from the central unit to which the various input and output modules, communication or modules for special functions were attached. The compact variants were configured by directly coupling the modules onto the support rail, the complex variants were configured by mounting modular boards in a dedicated drawer.

- Simatic S5-010 – Modular PLC system
  - Simatic S5-010K – Variant for injection molding machines (Kunststoffspritz).
  - Simatic S5-010W – Variant for machine tools (Werkzeugmaschinen) or positioning systems.
- Simatic S5-90U – Compact control units
  - Example: 6ES5090-8MA0x / S5-90 / 4 kByte RAM / Integrated 230 V AC power supply, 10 binary inputs, 6 relay outputs directly on the CPU
- Simatic S5-95 – Compact control units
  - Simatic S5-95F – Failsafe version - integrated safety functions
  - Simatic S5-95U – universal version

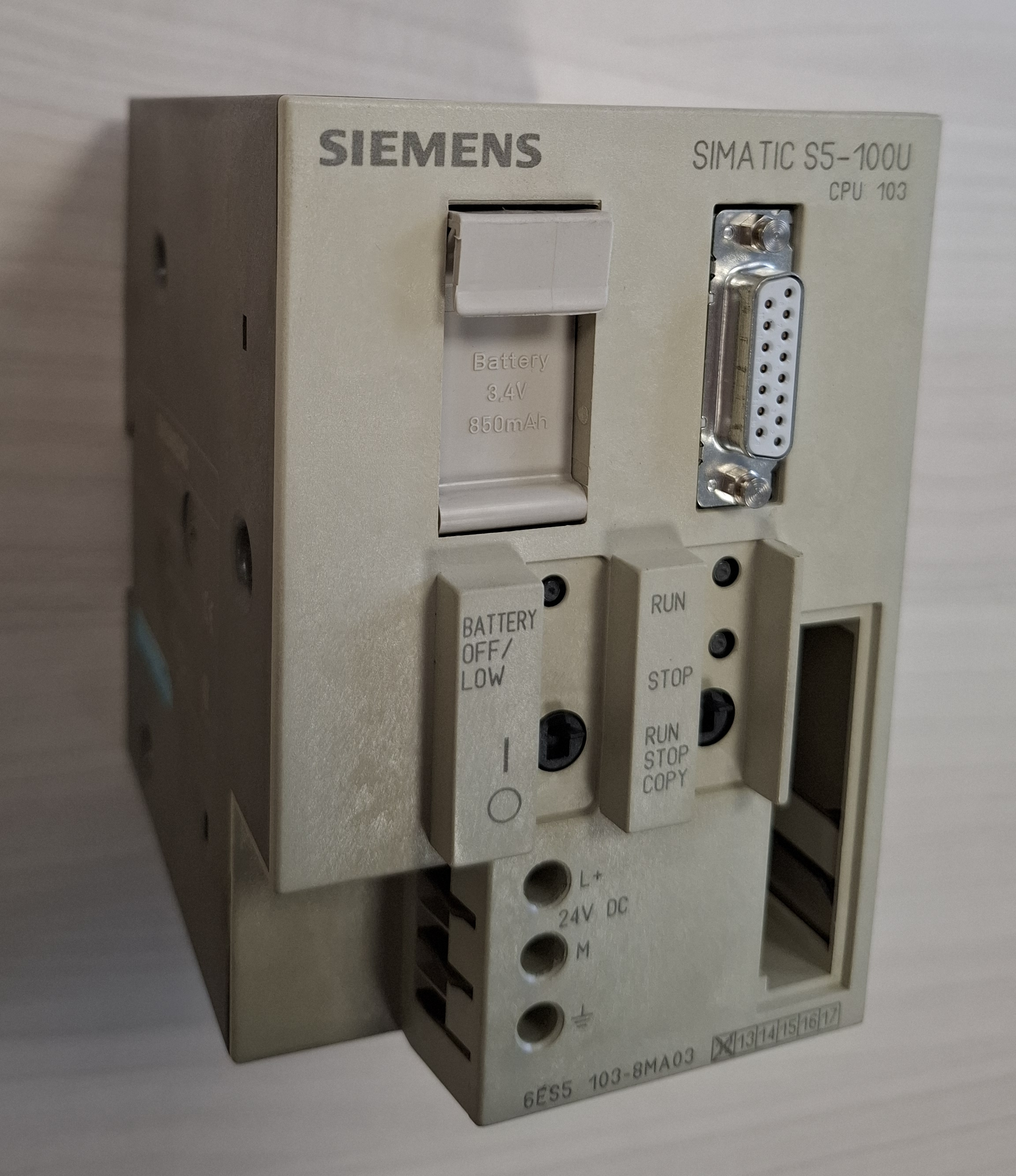
Simatic S5-100U CPU103, PLC central unit

- Simatic S5-100U – Modular unit
- Simatic S5-101 – Compact unit
  - Simatic S5-101R – Programming in LAD language only
  - Simatic S5-101U – Programming in AWL/STL, LAD and CSF/FBD; Expansion possible with expansion module
- Simatic S5-105R – Modular system in 19-inch drawer. Programming only in LAD ("R" stands for Relay - programming in LAD = relay diagram)
- Simatic S5-110 – Modular system
  - Simatic S5-110A – Modular
  - Simatic S5-110F – Failsafe version - integrated safety functions
  - Simatic S5-110S – Modular, drawer mounting with external I/O bus
- Simatic S5-115 – Modular system, fanless central unit, (fans for certain drawer types), different memory capacities depending on version, expandable memory with plug-in modules
  - Simatic S5-115F – Failsafe version - integrated safety functions
  - Simatic S5-115H – Redundant version (High Availability)
  - Simatic S5-115U – Universal version
- Simatic S5-130 – Mid-range modular system (performance-wise)
  - Simatic S5-130A – Robust version (encapsulated modules)
  - Simatic S5-130K – Compact version (cardboard in drawer)
  - Simatic S5-130W – Cardboard in drawer version for industrial process automation
- Simatic S5-135U – Mid-range modular system (performance-wise). The first Simatic system that allows multiprocessor configurations (up to 4 central units in parallel). Each central unit has its own PLC program, its own memory areas, counters and timers. Communication between the processors can be achieved via a common memory area (Dual-Port-RAM) or via data blocks (DB blocks).
  - Ex.: 6ES5 920-3UA1x, 6ES5 921-3UA1x, 6ES5 922-3UA1x, 6ES5 928-3UA1x, 6ES5 928-3UA2x, 6ES5 928-3UB1x, 6ES5 928-3UB2x, ...
- Simatic S5-150 – Modular system with ventilated drawer for complex automation or central coordination systems, introduced on the market in 1980.
  - Simatic S5-150A – Robust design variant (encapsulated modules)
  - Simatic S5-150K – Compact design variant (card boards in drawer)
  - Simatic S5-150S – Drawer design variant (card boards in drawer)
  - Simatic S5-150U – Drawer design variant (card-type boards in the drawer)
  - Ex.: 6ES5 924..., 6ES5 925..., 6ES5 926..., 6ES5 927...
- Simatic S5-155 – Modular system, with ventilated drawer, for complex automation, allows single- or multi-processor configurations.
  - Simatic S5-155H – Redundant version ("High Availability")
  - Simatic S5-155U - Universal version
  - Ex.: 6ES5 946..., 6ES5 947..., 6ES5 948...

=== Simatic S7 (S7-200, S7-300, S7-400) ===
(since 1994)

The first entries in the S7 line were released in 1994, available under three performance classes: S7-200, S7-300 and S7-400. The introduction of SIMATIC S7 saw also the release of a new fieldbus standard Profibus, and the pioneer use of industrial Ethernet to facilitate communication between automation devices. The great success of the S7-300 CPU family in particular helped to cement the role of Siemens as one of the global leaders in automation technology. These series are expected to be phased out in 2033.

Simatic S7-200

(phased-out - SIOS, 2017-07-26)

A series of small (80 mm x 62 mm), fast (0.22 μs binary execution time) PLC modules with an integrated RS 485 interface (PPI Interface = Point to Point Interface).

- for low-complexity automation applications
- Programmable using the Step 7 MicroWin software (originally Step 7 MicroDos).
- Although no longer marketed as such, S7-200 units are still used for the PLC units integrated in the Sinumerik 828D CNC Numerical Controls series.

Simatic S7-300

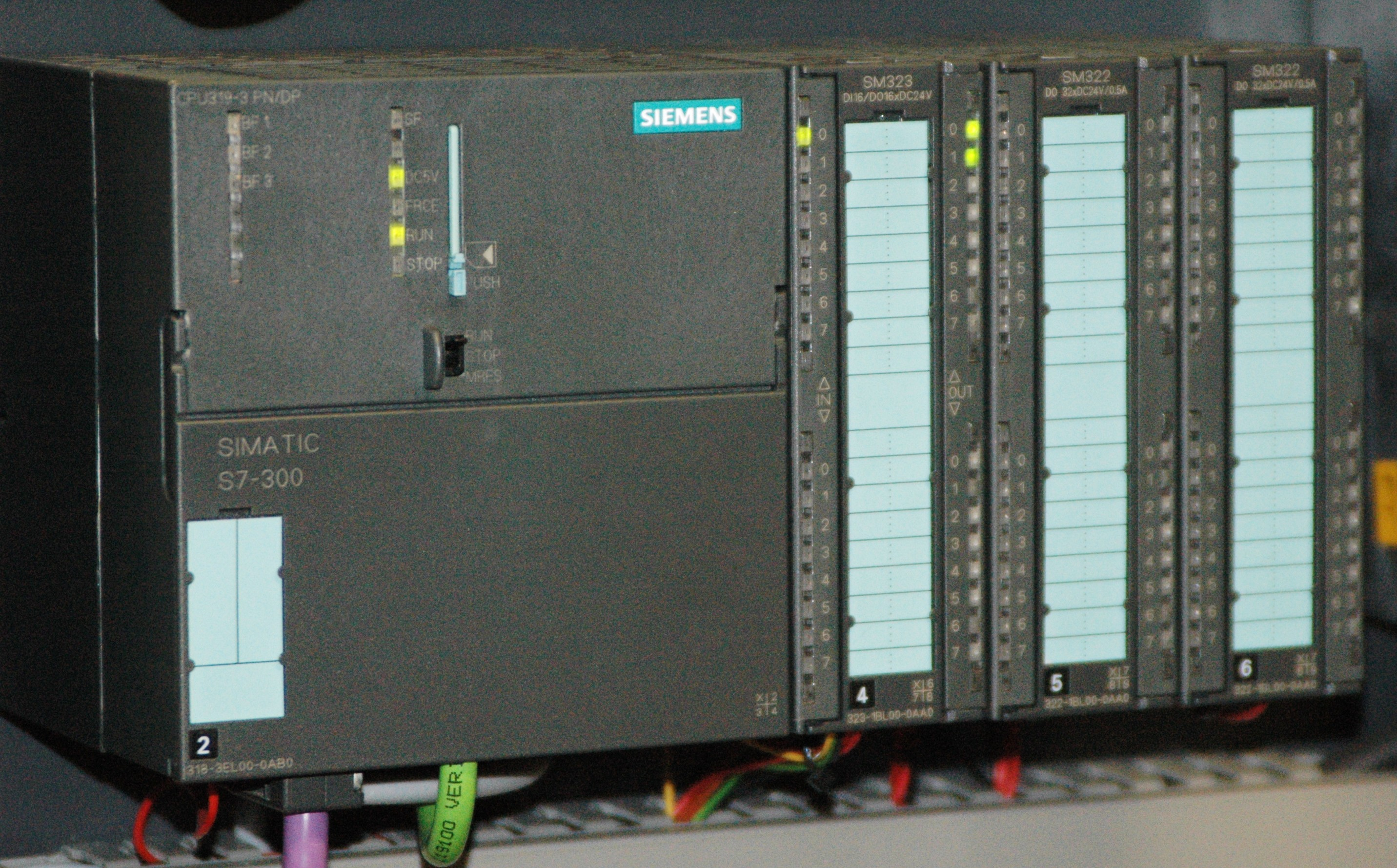
Siemens Simatic S7-300

Modular PLC system (but there are also some compact CPU units, with integrated Inputs/Outputs). Communication with other devices is possible via the integrated RS 485 (MPI = Multi Point Interface), Profibus, Profinet and Ethernet interfaces.

- modular system, expansion of the number of inputs/outputs by adding modules
- for automation applications of low or medium complexity
- system programming is done using the STEP 7 software package.
- PLC program storage is done on an MMC card inserted in the CPU unit.

The system consists of:

- A CPU unit that also includes communication functions (MPI, Profibus or Profinet, depending on the chosen variant)
- SM modules for connecting inputs and outputs (digital or analog)
- Optional: IM interface modules or SP communication processors for various types of communication buses
- Optional: FM function modules such as high-speed counters, positioning (closed/open loop), PID control, etc.

Simatic S7-300: Control units (extract)

- CPU 312 32 KB working memory, MPI interface; storage medium: MMC card
- CPU 314 128 KB working memory, MPI interface; storage medium: MMC card
- CPU 315-2DP 256 KB working memory, MPI interface, ProfiBus DP main/subordinate interface; storage medium: MMC card
- CPU 315-2 PN/DP 384 KB working memory, dual interface MPI/PROFIBUS DP main/subordinate, Ethernet/PROFINET interface with 2-port switch; MMC card
- CPU 317-2 DP 1 MB working memory, MPI interface, PROFIBUS DP main/subordinate interface; MMC card
- CPU 317-2 PN/DP 1 MB working memory, dual interface MPI/PROFIBUS DP main/subordinate, Ethernet/PROFINET interface with 2-port switch; MMC card
- CPU 319-3 PN/DP 2 MB working memory, dual interface MPI/PROFIBUS DP main/subordinate, PROFIBUS DP main/subordinate, Ethernet/PROFINET interface with 2-port switch; MMC card

Simatic S7-300F

Modular PLC system, based on S7-300, with extended functions for process control in which functional safety ("safety functionality") plays an important role.

- the system allows the achievement of functional safety requirements SIL 1 to SIL 3 according to IEC 61508, PL a to PL e according to EN ISO 13849-1, Cat 1, 2, 3 and 4 according to EN 954-1.
- the system implements the functionality of an S7-300 system, the functional safety functions only extend the possibilities of the system.
- special dedicated input / output modules ("failsafe") may be required to implement the safety functions, which can also be connected together with the usual input / output modules (mixed use).
- the system is programmed using the STEP 7 software package, for safety functions the STEP 7 Distributed Safety extension package is required.

Simatic S7-300 SIPLUS

Modular PLC system, based on S7-300, for use in adverse environmental conditions (-25 ... 60 °C, high humidity, frost, etc.).

Simatic S7-400

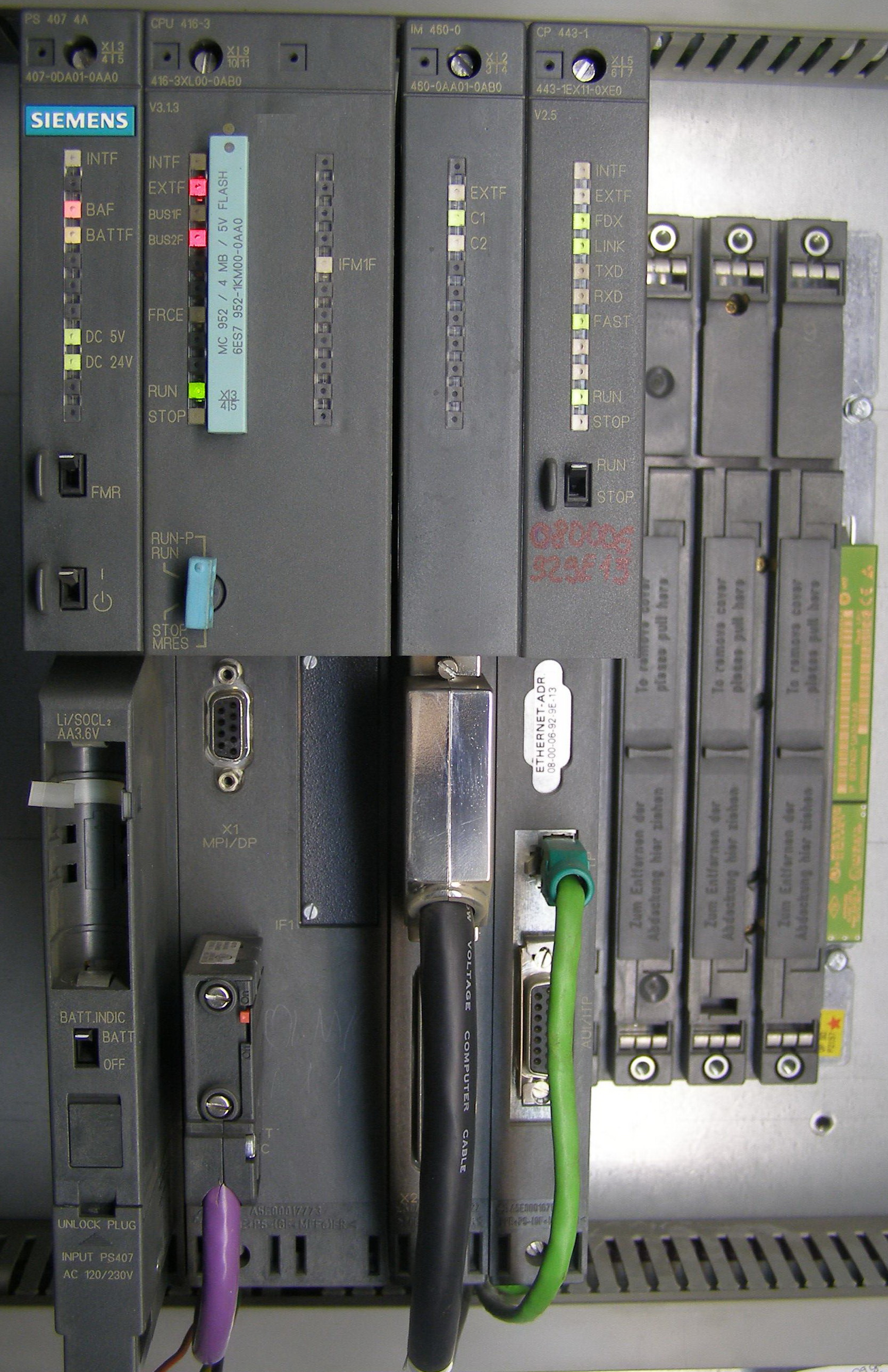
Siemens Simatic S7-400, from left to right: PS power supply unit, CPU unit 416-3, IM 460-0 interface module and CP 443-1 communication processor.

Modular PLC system, with dedicated drawer mounting. Communication with other devices is possible via the integrated RS 485 (MPI = Multi Point Interface), Profibus, Profinet and Ethernet interfaces.

- modular system, expansion of the number of inputs / outputs by adding modules in the drawer or distributed periphery.
- for medium and high complexity automation applications.
- system programming is done using the STEP 7 software package
- PLC program storage is done on the card
- allows the use of multiple CPU units in a single system (multi-processor) for complex applications.

The system consists of:

- A CPU unit that also includes communication functions (MPI, Profibus or Profinet, depending on the chosen variant)
- SM modules for connecting inputs and outputs (digital or analog)
- Optional: IM interface modules or SP communication processors for various types of communication buses
- Optional: FM function modules such as high-speed counting, positioning (closed/open loop), PID control, etc.

S7-400H

Redundant S7-400 system, with two central units and the possibility of connecting I/O modules in pairs, for extended availability.

S7-400F / S7-400FH

S7-400 "failsafe" system with safety functions, in single-channel or redundant version.

S7-400F: single-channel, single set of I/O

S7-400FH: redundant, I/O in pairs, switchable or single-channel, I/O in pairs

Simatic WinAC-RTX

SIMATIC WinAC RTX is a SIMATIC software control system, which can be installed on an industrial PC. The I/O modules can be connected via PROFIBUS or PROFINET using the Ethernet interface or PCI expansion cards.

=== Simatic S7 (S7-1200, S7-1500) ===
(since 2009)

In April 2009, Siemens initiated a generational change in the Simatic S7 controllers by launching, first, the S7-1200 controller family, then, in 2012, S7-1500.

Simatic S7-1200

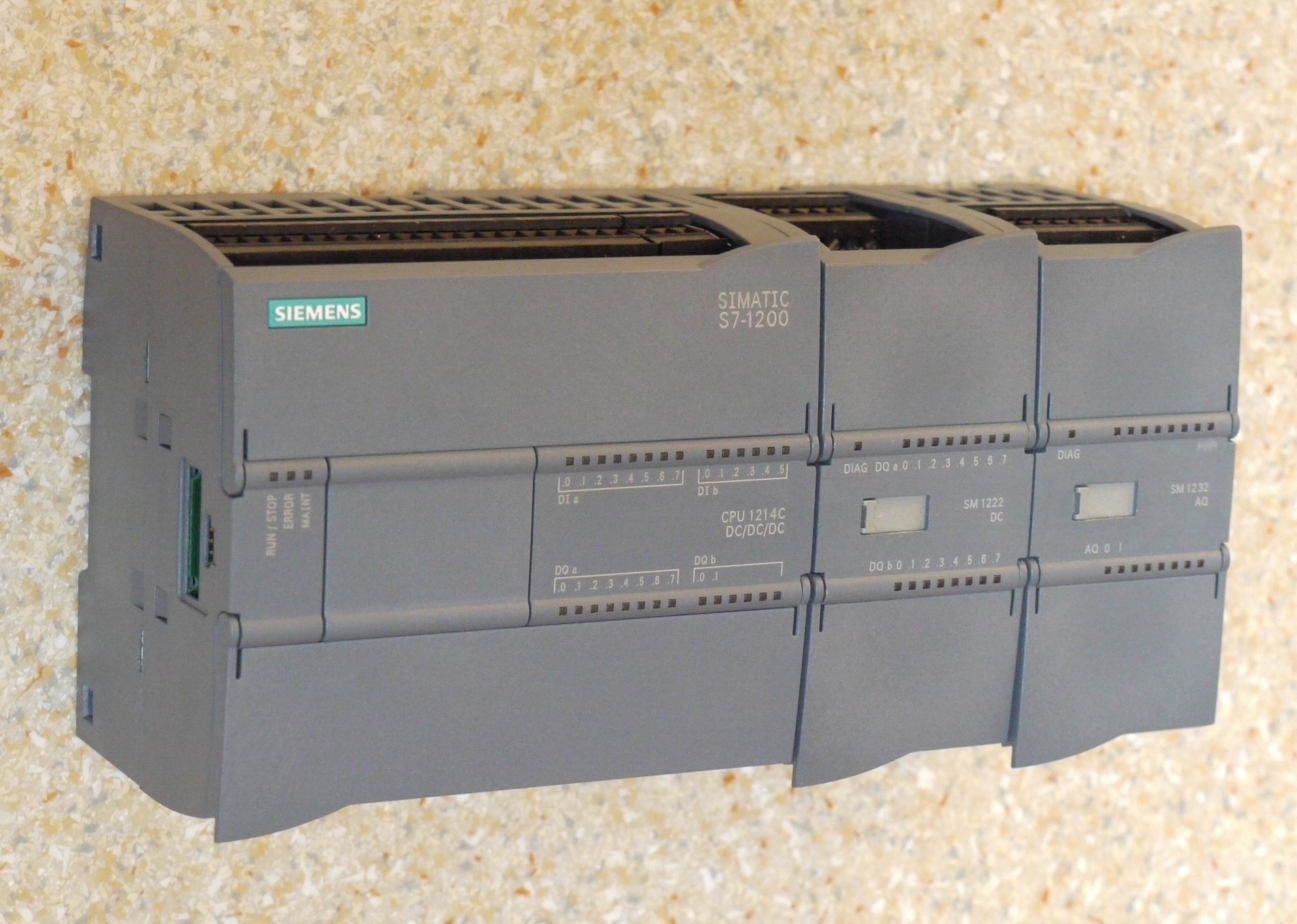
Siemens Simatic S7-1200

(since 2009)

S7-1200 is a family of small (approx. 100 mm × 75 mm), compact PLC units, intended for low-complexity control solutions. It has up to 150 kB of working memory, 2 Mbytes of integrated program memory that can be expanded up to 24 Mbytes and an execution time for bit instructions of approximately 0.1 μs. Communication with other devices is possible via the integrated Profinet and Ethernet interfaces or via optional communication modules.

- modular system, expansion of the number of inputs / outputs by adding modules
- for automation applications of low or medium complexity
- system programming is done using the software package TIA STEP 7 (Totally Integrated Automation Step 7).
- PLC program storage is done internally, on the EEPROM integrated in the module, or on the Simatic Memory Card (SD Card).

The system consists of:

- A CPU unit that also includes Profinet communication functions and a number of digital or analog inputs and outputs.
- Optional: SM modules for expanding the number of inputs and outputs (digital or analog).
- Optional: CM communication modules for various types of communication buses (RS232, ModBus, GPRS, ...).
- Optional: 4-port Ethernet network switch
- Optional: Connection module for SIWAREX weighing systems
- Optional: "Condition Monitoring" module for monitoring drive systems (wear, motor bearings, etc.)

Simatic S7-1200: Control units (extract)

- CPU 1211C DC/DC/DC, AC/DC/relay, DC/DC/relay, 50 KB working memory, 6I/4Q/2AI, expandable with expansion board
- CPU 1212C DC/DC/DC, AC/DC/relay, DC/DC/relay, 75 KB working memory, 8I/6Q/2AI, expandable with expansion board and up to 2 I/O modules
- CPU 1214C DC/DC/DC, AC/DC/relay, DC/DC/relay, 100 KB working memory, 14I/10Q/2AI, expandable with expansion board and up to 8 I/O modules
- CPU 1215C DC/DC/DC, AC/DC/relay, DC/DC/relay, 125 KB working memory, 14I/10Q/2AI/2AQ, expandable with expansion board and up to 8 I/O modules
- CPU 1217C DC/DC/DC, 150 KB working memory, 14I/10Q/2AI/2AQ, expandable with expansion board and up to 8 I/O modules
- CPU 1212FC (failsafe) DC/DC/DC, DC/DC/relay, 100 KB working memory, 8I/6Q/2AI, expandable with expansion board and up to 2 I/O modules (including failsafe I/O)
- CPU 1214FC (failsafe) DC/DC/DC, DC/DC/relay, 125 KB working memory, 14I/10Q/2AI, expandable with expansion board and up to 8 I/O modules (including failsafe I/O)
- CPU 1215FC (failsafe) DC/DC/DC, DC/DC/relay, 150 KB working memory, 14I/10Q/2AI/2AQ, expandable with expansion board and up to 8 I/O modules (including failsafe I/O)

Simatic S7-1200 G2

(since 2024)

The S7-1200 G2, the second generation of programmable controllers in the S7-1200 range, was presented at the Hannover Messe 2024 edition and launched on the market in December 2024 - January 2025, together with TIA-Portal v20.

The S7-1200 G2 modules are not hardware compatible with those of the first generation. Compared to the first generation S7-1200, the new modules have improvements regarding:

- reduced execution time
- support for ProfiNet communication of Real-Time (RT) and Isochronous Real-Time (IRT) type
- support for Media Redundancy for Planned Duplication (MRPD) and Media Redundancy Protocol (MRP)
- Program memory of up to 300kB, data memory of up to 750kB, working memory of up to 8MB
- support for the use of SIMATIC Motion Library technology objects (TO_SpeedAxis, TO_PositioningAxis, TO_SynchronousAxis, TO_ExternalEncoder, TO_OutputCam, TO_CamTrack, TO_MeasuringInput, TO_Cam, TO_Kinematics)
- SIMATIC Controller Profiling
- Extended functionality regarding data security (event log, support for user and role management)
- Near Field Communication (NFC) connectivity. Allows diagnosis and parameterization of the CPU unit using a phone app (initially only I-OS). In 2025, few months after S7-1200 G2 series launch, the NFC interface was deactivated in a new firmware release.

Simatic S7-1200 G2: Control units (extract)

- CPU 1212C G2 DC/DC/DC, AC/DC/relay, DC/DC/relay, 150 KB program memory, 500kB data memory, 8DI/6DQ, expandable with expansion board
- CPU 1214C G2 DC/DC/DC, AC/DC/relay, DC/DC/relay, 250 KB program memory, 750kB data memory, 14DI/10DQ, expandable with one or two expansion boards
- CPU 1212FC G2 DC/DC/DC, DC/DC/relay, 150 KB program memory, 500kB data memory, 8DI/6DQ, expandable with expansion board
- CPU 1214C G2 DC/DC/DC, AC/DC/relay, DC/DC/relay, 250 KB program memory, 750kB data memory, 14DI/10DQ, expandable with one or two expansion boards

Simatic S7-1500

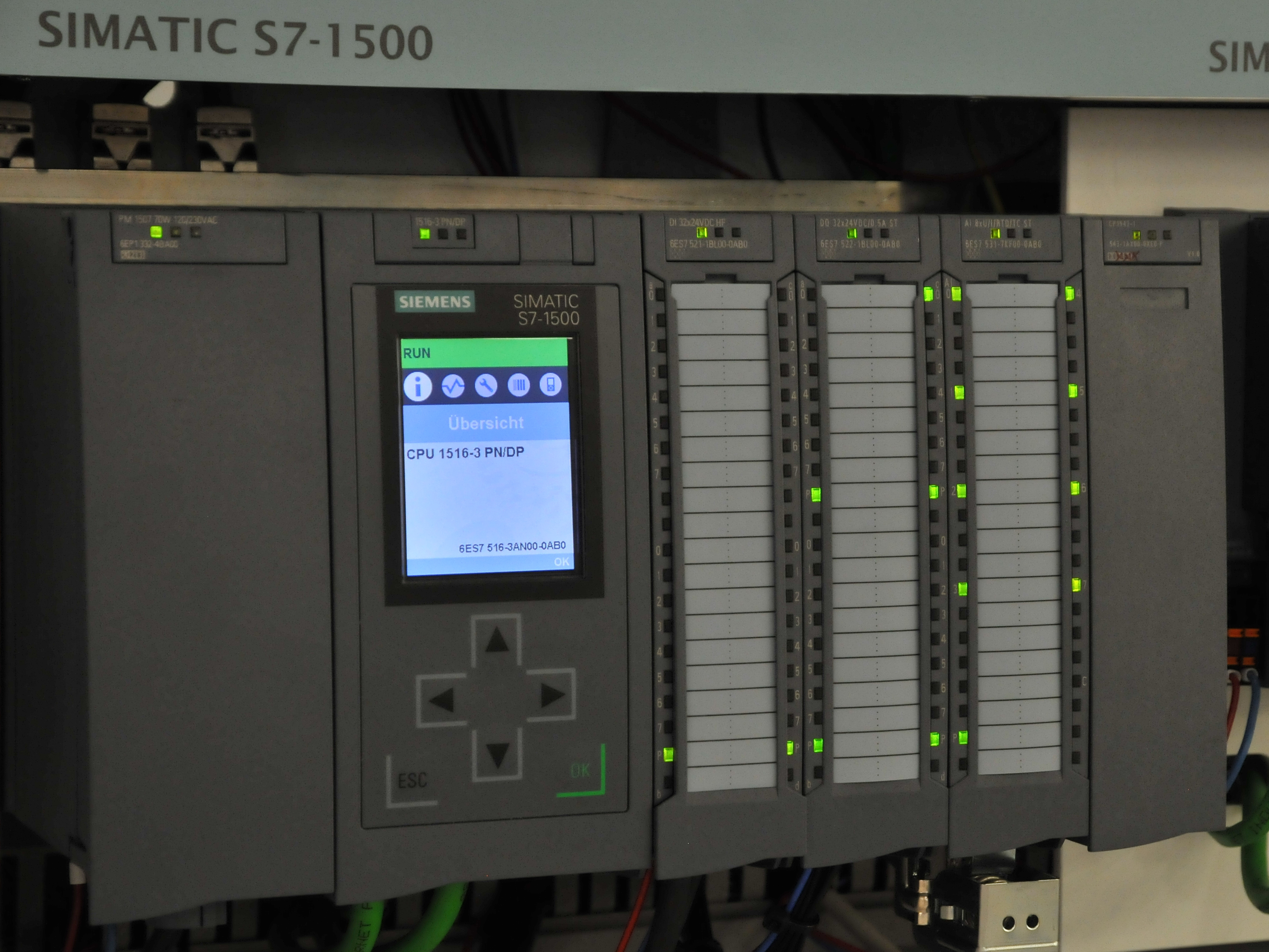
Siemens Simatic S7-1500

(since 2012)

At the press conference of the 2012 edition of the SPS/IPC/DRIVES trade fair in Nuremberg, Siemens presented the new Simatic S7-1500 controller which should gradually replace the units of the S7-300 and S7-400 series. Motion control functions are now integrated into every CPU as standard, only extended functions such as kinematics requiring special PLC units from the S7-1500T series. Functional safety (up to SIL3 according to IEC 62061 and PL-e according to ISO 13849) is available in the failsafe S7-1500F CPU variants. The CPU units are equipped with Profinet interfaces as standard, have an integrated web server and a color display and can be expanded with up to 32 modules in the central drawer.

- modular system, expansion of the number of inputs / outputs by adding modules
- for automation applications of medium to high complexity
- system programming is done using the software package TIA STEP 7 (Totally Integrated Automation Step 7).
- PLC program storage is done on a Simatic Memory Card (SD Card).

Simatic S7-1500: Control units (excerpt)

- CPU 1511-1PN, 150KB Program, 1MB Data 6ES7511-1AK02-0AB0
- CPU 1511-1PN, 300KB Program, 1.5MB Data 6ES7511-1AL03-0AB0
- CPU 1513-1PN, 300KB Program, 1.5MB Data 6ES7513-1AL02-0AB0
- CPU 1513-1PN, 600KB Program, 2.5MB Data 6ES7513-1AM03-0AB0
- CPU 1515-2PN, 500KB Program, 3MB Data 6ES7515-2AM02-0AB0
- CPU 1515-2PN, 1MB Program, 4.5MB Data 6ES7515-2AN03-0AB0
- CPU 1516-3PN/DP, 1MB Program, 5MB Data 6ES7516-3AN02-0AB0
- CPU 1516-3PN/DP, 2MB Program, 7.5MB Data 6ES7516-3AP03-0AB0
- CPU 1517-3PN/DP, 2MB Program, 8MB Data 6ES7517-3AP00-0AB0
- CPU 1518-4PN/DP, 6MB Program, 60MB Data 6ES7518-4AP00-0AB0
- CPU 1518-4PN/DP MFP + C/C++ RT + OPC UA 6ES7518-4AX00-1AC0

Simatic S7-1500: Failsafe control units (extract)

- CPU 1511F-1PN, 225KB Program, 1MB data 6ES7511-1FK02-0AB0
- CPU 1511F-1PN, 450KB Program, 1.5MB Data 6ES7511-1FL03-0AB0
- CPU 1513F-1PN, 450KB Program, 1.5MB Data 6ES7513-1FL02-0AB0
- CPU 1513F-1PN, 900KB Program, 2.5MB Data 6ES7513-1FM03-0AB0
- CPU 1515F-2PN, 750KB Program, 3MB Data 6ES7515-2FM02-0AB0
- CPU 1515F-2PN, 1.5MB Program, 4.5MB Data 6ES7515-2FN03-0AB0
- CPU 1516F-3PN/DP, 1.5MB Program, 5MB Data 6ES7516-3FN02-0AB0
- CPU 1516F-3PN/DP, 3MB Program, 7.5MB Data 6ES7516-3FP03-0AB0
- CPU 1517F-3PN/DP, 3MB Program, 8MB Data 6ES7517-3FP00-0AB0
- CPU 1518F-4PN/DP, 9MB Program, 60MB Data 6ES7518-4FP00-0AB0
- CPU 1518F-4PN/DP MFP + C/C++ RT +OPC UA 6ES7518-4FX00-1AC0

Simatic S7-1500: SIPLUS (for extreme temperature, vibration, etc.)

- Most of the above modules can also be ordered in SIPLUS version

Simatic S7-1500 Technology: extended technology functions for implementing complex axis synchronizations or kinematic functions (Motion Control)

- CPU 151*T: S7-1500 CPU variants with extended technology functions
- CPU 151*TF: variants with extended technology functions and failsafe

Simatic S7-1500 "Fault-tolerant" and redundant:

- CPU 1513R-1 PN, 600KB program/2.5MB data 6ES7513-1RM03-0AB0
- CPU 1515R-2 PN, 1MB program/ 4.5MB data 6ES7515-2RN03-0AB0
- CPU 1517H-3 PN, 2MB program/8MB data 6ES7517-3HP00-0AB0
- CPU 1518HF-4 PN, 9MB program/60MB data 6ES7518-4JP00-0AB0
- CPU 1513R-1 PN, 300KB program/1.5MB data 6ES7513-1RL00-0AB0
- CPU 1515R-2 PN, 500KB program/ 3MB data 6ES7515-2RM00-0AB0
- SIPLUS S7-1500 CPU 1517H-3 PN 6AG1517-3HP00-4AB0
- SIPLUS S7-1500 CPU 1518HF-4 PN

== Software ==
The first generations of Simatic control systems (Simatic G, Simatic S) were implemented using hard-wired programmed logic controllers. Simatic S3 was the first microprocessor-based control system that allowed programmable logic.

Simatic S5, launched in 1979, was initially programmed using special programming consoles and later using the STEP 5 software package, one of the first advanced PLC programming software.

For programming the Simatic S7 300 and 400 systems, Siemens has launched the software package STEP 7, the Simatic S7 200 series being programmed with a separate software called STEP 7 MicroWin.

With the introduction of the S7 1200 and S7 1500 series controllers on the market, Siemens has launched a new software package called TIA Portal (Totally Integrated Automation Portal). It allows programming of the new generation S7 1200 and S7 1500 controllers as well as controllers from previous series.

=== STEP 5 ===
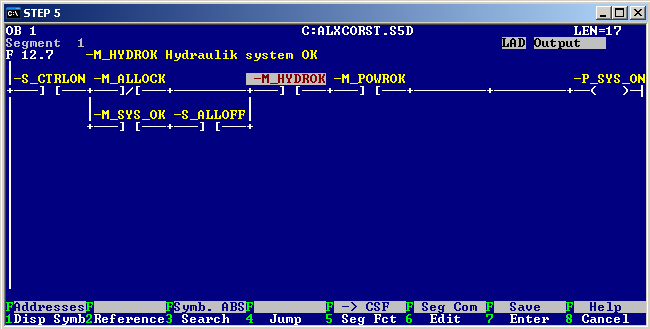
Sample PLC program STEP5 LAD

STEP 5 (name derived from STeuerungen Einfach Programmieren = easy programming of control systems) is a programming and diagnostic software for the Simatic S5 series of programmable controllers, originally released in 1979 only on the PG630 programming consoles, under the operating system CP/M. With the withdrawal of Simatic S5 systems from production, STEP 5 continued to be offered by Siemens but development of the software package was discontinued. The latest edition is version 7.2 (with upgrade to version 7.23 Hotfix 1 with patches) and can run (under certain conditions) on Windows 10 systems and is offered by Siemens for certain configurations of Field PG M6 programming consoles.

STEP 5 was offered in two versions:

Step 5 Standard, which can be used for programming, testing, commissioning and automatic generation of documentation for the Simatic S5-90U, S5-95/U/F, S5-100U, S5-101U, S5-115U/H/F, S5-135U, S5-150U and S5-155U/H series controllers.

Step 5 for mini PLCs, limited to the S5-90U, S5-95U/F and S5-100U controllers and allowing only a limited number of optional software packages: GRAPH Mini, COM IP 266, COM 95F, COM DG1, COM 521 BASIC.

Software modules

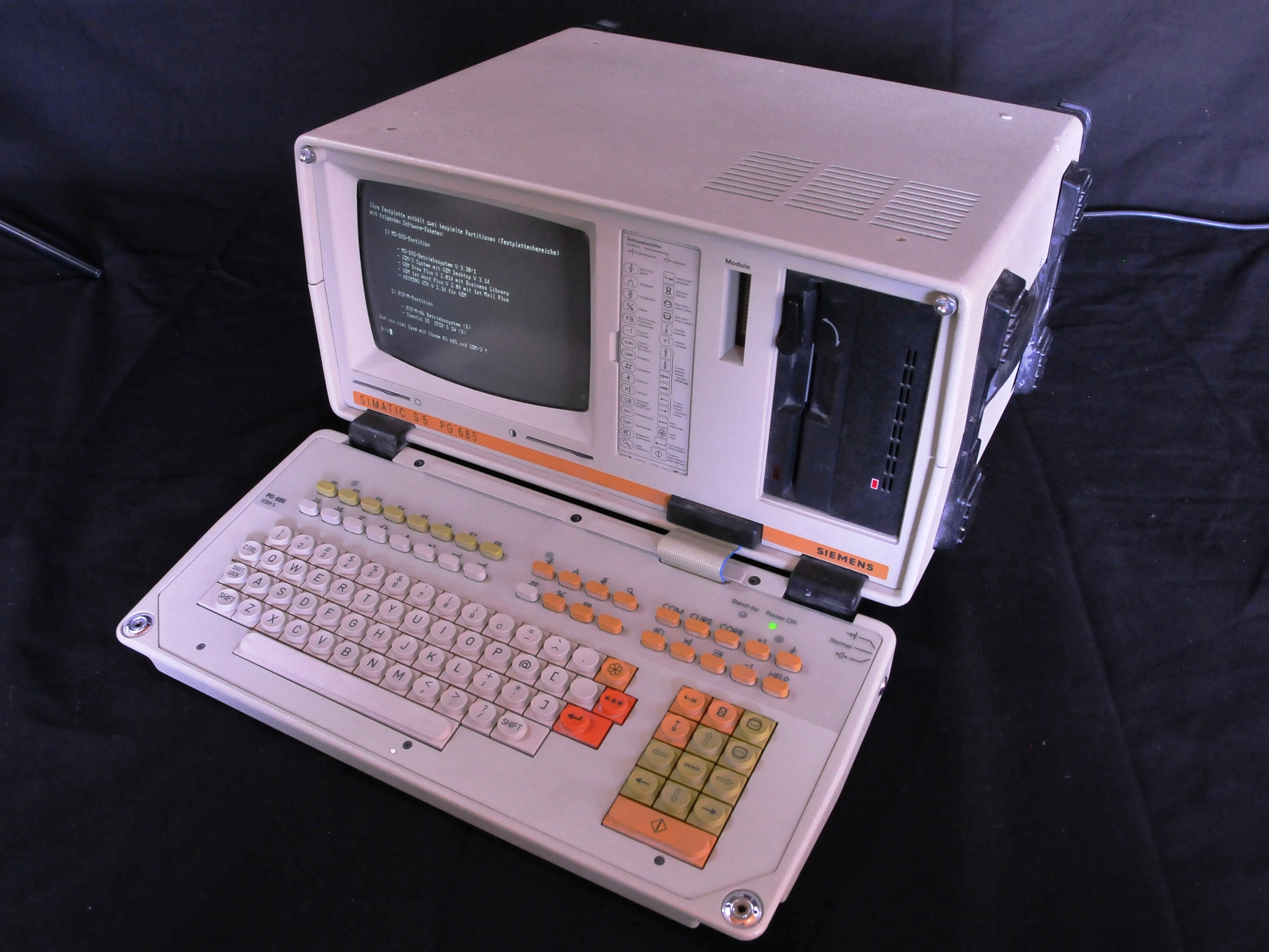
PG685 programming console for STEP5 programming of Simatic-S5 PLCs

Since the first computers (Field PG programming consoles) had limited hardware resources (e.g. restrictions on RAM capacity), STEP 5 was developed modularly, in individual software packages that were launched (and loaded into memory) only when they were needed. [SIOS ID: 19417353]

LAD, CSF, STL

This module contains the editors for user programs. Programming of Simatic S5 PLCs can be done in one of the following languages:

- STL (STatement List, called AWL = Anweisungliste in German or IL = Instruction List according to IEC 61131-3). It is a low-level language, according to DIN 19239, similar to assembly language, with an extended set of instructions that offers great flexibility in writing and optimizing the program. Control of program execution is achieved using Jump, BE and function calls.
- LAD (Logical LADder, called KOP = Kontaktplan in German or LD according to IEC 61131-3). It is a graphical language according to DIN 19239 in which the user program is represented similar to a circuit diagram.
- CSF (Control System Flowchart, called FUP = Funktionsplan in German or FDB according to IEC 61131-3). It is a graphical language, according to DIN 40700, in which the user program is represented similar to an electronic diagram with logic gates.

XRF, COMP, REW

- XRF: This module allows the generation of cross references (XRF = Cross References, QL = Querverweisliste in German).
- COMP: Comparison of blocks in the offline project with those in the programmable controller (from the connected EPROM or from the connected online PLC, context-dependent), for example.
- REW: "Rewiring" function: search and replace an operand with another operand in all blocks of a STEP 5 project.

EPROM / EEPROM

It allows the transfer of the PLC program from PG (or PC) to EPROM (or EEPROM), from EPROM / EEPROM to PG / PC or the comparison of the program from PG / PC with that in EPROM / EEPROM. (PG = Programming Console, PC = Personal Computer).

Symbol Editor

An editor through which each operand can be assigned a symbol and a comment that can be viewed in program editors.

Optional COM modules

Various optional packages, such as GRAPH5 (for sequential programming), PG-NET (networking), KOMDOC (generate documentation), COM266 (for IP266 positioning module), COM723 (for WF723 CNC module), COM-ET200 (for distributed periphery), etc.

OB, PB, SB, FB/FX, DB/DX blocks

In STEP 5 the program can be structured into blocks whose execution can be controlled.

- OB: organization blocks: for program management.
- PB: program blocks: contain the user program structured according to functional or process requirements. When migrating a PLC program from STEP5 to STEP 7, PB blocks are converted to FC blocks but in the conversion guide they are assigned to FB blocks.
- SB: sequence blocks: blocks for programming sequencers. When using the GRAPH 5 module (software extension), the entire sequencer can be written in a single SB block.
- FB: function blocks: similar to FC blocks from S7 controllers.
- FX: extended function blocks: Similar to FB functions. They are not a new type of block, they are still FB blocks but, for certain CPU units, they allow the use of additional memory resources and their address area.
- DB: data blocks. They do not contain code and can be considered an extension of the working memory (the PLC working memory area, denoted F in STEP 5 and similar to the M area in STEP 7).
- DX: data blocks (extended): similar to DB blocks. They are not a new type of block, they are still DB blocks but, for certain CPU units, they allow the use of additional memory resources and their address range.

History of STEP5

STEP 5 versions (excerpt)
Version	Since	Description
v1.0	1979	CP/M operating system, hardware: PG630
v1.1		hardware: PG702
v1.4		hardware: PG605U, PG615
v2.0		CP/M-86 operating system, hardware: PG675
v2.2		CP/M-86 operating system, hardware: PG675
v3.0		CP/M-86 operating system, hardware: PG685
v3.2		CP/M-86 operating system, hardware: PG685..PG750/770
v6.3	1992	MS-DOS operating system, hardware: PG750
v6.5	1996	MS-DOS operating system, hardware: PG720/740 or PC with TTY interface
v7.0	1997	Windows 95 operating system (MS-DOS in DOS-Box)
v7.23 HF1	2004	Windows XP SP3 operating system (MS-DOS in DOS-Box)
v7.23 HF2	2016	Windows 7 operating system (only for Field PG M5 with STEP 5 option)
v7.23 HF2	2019	Windows 10 operating system (only for Field PG M6 with STEP 5 option)

=== STEP 7 MicroWin ===
(v1.0 - v4.0, originally named STEP 7 MicroDOS)

was the programming and diagnostic software for the S7 200 series of programmable controllers, originally released in 1995. Last version was STEP 7-Micro/WIN V4.0 SP9 released in 2012.

STEP 7 MicroWin versions (excerpt)
Version	Since	Description	SIOS ID
v1.0	1995	STEP7 Micro/DOS 1.0. First version, launched in 1995, under MS-DOS 5.0.	
v1.1	1996	STEP7 Micro/DOS 1.1. Under MS-DOS 5.0, minor improvements compared to 1.0	4801875
v1.2	1996	STEP7 Micro/DOS 1.2. Under MS-DOS 5.0, but running also under Windows 3.1, 3.11 and in Windows'95 DOS shell.: TD 200 configuration; network related functions (NETR, NETW).; floating point instructions; online monitoring of STL code	4320841
v1.2	1997	STEP7 MicroWin 1.2. Under Windows 3.1, 3.11 or 95.: Programming in STL or LAD; alternative to Micro/DOS version	4327447
v1.3	1997	STEP7 Micro/DOS 1.3. Various improvements compared to v1.2. Under MS-DOS 5.0, or in DOS shell.	
v2.0	1997	STEP7 MicroWin 2.0. Under Windows 3.1, Windows for Workgroups 3.11, Windows 95 or Windows NT 3.51. Major improvements and support for new CPU S7-200 versions	4331390
v2.1	1998	STEP7 MicroWin 2.1. Support for Windows NT4.x: Updated with v2.11, v2.12	4337507
v3.0	1999	STEP7 MicroWin 3.0.: Programming in STL, LAD, FBD; Updated with SP1 and SP2 (v3.02)	4353207
v3.1 v3.2	2000	STEP7 MicroWin 3.1.: Symbolic access; Trigonometric instructions (for certain S7-200 CPUs); Support for PROFIBUS DP subordinate modules (for certain S7-200 CPUs); STEP7 MicroWin 3.11 in 2001; STEP7 MicroWin 3.1.2.22 in 2001; STEP7 MicroWin 3.2.0.108 in 2002; STEP7 MicroWin 3.2.1.0 in 2002; STEP7 MicroWin 3.2.2 in 2003; STEP7 MicroWin 3.2.3 in 2003; STEP7 MicroWin 3.2.4 (SIOS ID 16649966) in 2003	4558765
ToolBox v1.0	2000	STEP 7-Micro/WIN32 Toolbox V1.0.: Additional functions for S7-200; TP Designer Software for TP070; Support for USS communication with MicroMaster drives; Updated in 2002 as STEP 7-Micro/WIN Add-On Instruction Library, V 1.1	4559082 11859930
v4.0	2004	STEP7 MicroWin 4.0.: PID, PID Autotune; Positioning using Pulse Train Output (PTO), Pulse Width Modulation (PWM); Data Logging Wizard; Recipe Wizard; Online Trend Chart; STEP 7-Micro/WIN V4.0.1 in 2004 (SIOS ID 19798037); STEP 7-Micro/WIN V4.0.2 in 2005 (SIOS ID 21897112); STEP 7-Micro/WIN V4.0.3 in 2006 (SIOS ID 22418336); STEP 7-Micro/WIN V4.0.4 in 2006 (SIOS ID 23544164); STEP 7-Micro/WIN V4.0 SP5 in 2007 (with FieldPG M); STEP 7-Micro/WIN V4.0 SP6 in 2008 (FieldPG M2); STEP 7-Micro/WIN V4.0 SP7 in 2009 (FieldPG M3); STEP 7-Micro/WIN V4.0 SP8 in 2010; STEP 7-Micro/WIN V4.0 SP9 in 2012 (SIOS ID 60035301)	19300593

=== STEP 7 MicroWin SMART ===
This is the continuation of STEP 7 MicroWin, but released only in "emerging markets" (China and India). This product line features a new form factor with a simplified set of expansion modules, and very similar functionality to its predecessor.

Initially released as V1.0 in 2012. V2.1 was released in 2015, featuring support for more expansion modules (increased from 4 to 6).

V3.0 was released in 2025, featuring support for SMART V3.0 CPU models, with larger program memory and user data memory, support for FB and UDT, support for 2 signal boards (used to be 1), and support for 8 expansion modules (used to be 6).

V3.1 was released in 2026, featuring support for SMART G2 CPU (only ST32 at time of launch), with a redesigned form factor resembling ET200BL.

=== STEP 7 ===
(v1.0 - v5.7)

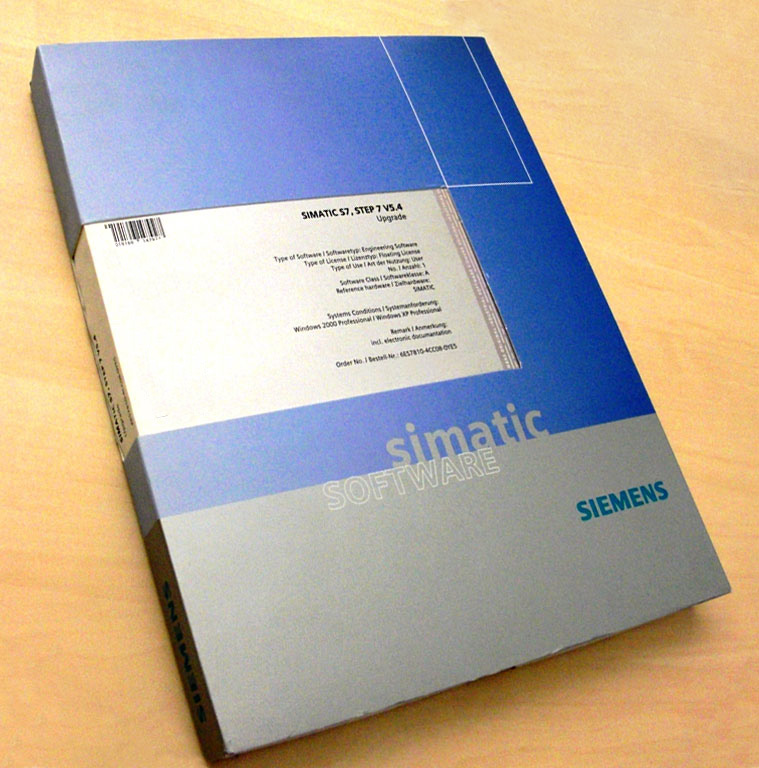
Siemens Simatic Step 7 Software Installation Kit

STEP 7 (name derived from STeuerungen Einfach Programmieren = easy programming of control systems) is a programming and diagnostic software for the programmable controllers of the Simatic S7, SIMATIC C7 and SIMATIC WinAC series.

STEP 7 can be used in the various stages of an automation project:

- description and parameterization of the hardware configuration.
- specification and parameterization of communication interfaces.
- programming of PLC automation logic.
- commissioning, testing and troubleshooting of automation systems.
- documentation and archiving of projects.

STEP 7 is designed as a modular software package that offers various utilities for the development of automation projects.

Simatic Manager: For the central management of all utilities and data of the SIMATIC S7, C7 or WinAC automation project.

Hardware Editor: For configuring the automation system and parameterizing the modules that can be set.

Symbol Editor: For defining the global tags used, the symbolic names, data types and comments for them.

Program Editor: For editing user programs, using one of the standardized PLC programming languages (according to EN 61131-3):

- STL (Statement List, called AWL = Anweisungliste in German or IL = Instruction List according to IEC 61131-3). It is a low level language, according to DIN 19239, similar to assembly language, with an extended set of instructions that provides great flexibility in writing and optimizing the program. Control of program execution is achieved using Jump, BE and function calls.
- LAD (Logical LADder, called KOP = Kontaktplan in German or LD according to IEC 61131-3). It is a graphical language according to DIN 19239 in which the user program is represented similar to an electrical diagram (American format - ladder diagram). In most cases the program displayed in LAD is easier to understand and the on-line debugging is intuitive and easier than debugging a program displayed in STL. However, in STEP 7 (up to v5.x inclusive) user programs are saved and transferred to the Simatic S7 programmable controller only in STL (AWL). LAD is only a form of displaying the user program that does not contain all the instructions available in STL.
- FBD (Function Block Diagram, FBS – Funktionsbausteinsprache in German or FDB according to IEC 61131-3; similar to the CSF language of STEP 5). It is a graphical language, according to DIN 40700, in which the user program is represented similar to an electronic diagram with logic gates. In most cases the program displayed in CSF/FBD is easier to understand and the on-line debugging is intuitive and easier than debugging a program displayed in STL. However, in STEP 7 (up to and including v5.x) user programs are saved and transferred to the Simatic S7 programmable controller only in STL (AWL). CSF/FBD is only a form of displaying the user program that does not contain all the instructions available in STL.

Optionally, STEP 7 also offers the following languages (usually subject to the purchase of a license):

- S7-SCL (Structured Control Language, ST according to IEC 61131-3). It is a high-level language, based on the PASCAL language, which allows the use of complex language structures such as REPEAT-UNTIL, WHILE-DO, IF-THEN-ELSE, CASE, etc.
- S7-Graph (Sequential Function Diagram, SFC according to IEC 61131-3). A graphical programming language, which allows the implementation of sequential control structures, based on the concept of binary Petri nets. An S7-Graph program consists of a number of steps, each step having associated PLC program actions / equations, and a number of transitions that allow the transition from a certain step to another upon the fulfillment of certain conditions.
- S7-HiGraph (Siemens-specific, not conforming to IEC 61131-3 standardization). A graphical programming language, similar to S7-Graph, that allows the implementation of advanced binary control structures, similar to state diagrams.
- S7-CFC (Continuous Function Chart, Siemens-specific, not conforming to IEC 61131-3 standardization). A graphical editor used to create the entire PLC program structure from ready-to-program library blocks. In the editor these blocks are selected in graphs, parameterized and interconnected. CFCs are mainly used for continuous process control, where complex open or closed loop control tasks can be easily mapped into CFCs.

S7-PLCSIM: A simulator for S7-300, S7-400 or WinAC systems that allows testing of an S7 automation project in a virtual environment.

OB, FC, FB, DB blocks

In STEP 7, the program can be structured into blocks whose execution can be controlled.

- OB: organization blocks: for program management. In STEP 7, OB blocks are launched by the PLC, with certain OB blocks being launched by certain events. For example, when the PLC starts (for most Simatic S7 systems), OB100 is automatically run, if it exists, then OB1 is cyclically run (after OB1 execution is completed, this block is launched again). When an OB block is launched by the PLC, detailed information about the event that led to the execution of the OB block is transferred to the OB block interface, information that can be used in the user program.
- FC: Functions: contain user program sequences structured according to functional or process requirements, generally sequences for frequently used functions. Each function returns a single parameter (but as an extension of the IEC standard it is possible for a function to return several parameters). All output parameters of the block must be processed directly after the FC block is called.
- FB: Function Blocks: contain user program sequences structured according to functional or process requirements. FB blocks can be called with different input data for each call (so-called instance). This data, as well as internal variables (for storing intermediate values) and the block outputs, are saved in a data block (DB) allocated when the FB block is called and managed automatically by the system. This DB block, also called instance DB, should be unique for each FB block call and can be generated automatically when the program is compiled. The data in the instance DB blocks can be accessed at any time from the user program.
- DB: data blocks. They do not contain code and can be considered an extension of the working memory (PLC working memory area, denoted M in STEP 7). They can be global/generic data blocks (Shared DB), instance DB blocks pre-assigned to a certain FB block type (Instance DB), or predefined blocks according to a UDT template (DB of type...). Both elementary data types (BOOL, INTEGER, REAL, etc.) and complex data types (ARRAY, STRUCT, etc.) can be assigned to the data blocks.
- SFC: System Functions: are functions integrated into the CPU operating system, e.g. block transfer functions, time reading, etc.
- SFB: System Function Blocks: are function blocks integrated into the CPU operating system, e.g. SEND, RECEIVE, etc. Their variables are saved in data blocks, similar to FB function blocks.
- SDB: system data blocks. These are data blocks for the CPU operating system that contain system settings, e.g. module parameters, etc.

STEP 7 versions (excerpt):

STEP 7 versions (excerpt)
Version	Release date	Description	SIOS ID
v1.0	1995	The first version was released in 1995 under Windows 3.11.	4324639
v2.0	1995/1996	Includes support for Simatic S7-400, possibility to install S7-GRAPH, under Windows 95	4321318
v2.1	27.08.1996	Update to version 2.0, adding newly released S7 300 CPU modules.	4326950
v3.0	1997	Initially released in German only. First version to allow use of PLCSIM (released August 1997) and first version to allow programming of S7 WinAC (a software PLC)	4802253
v3.1	15.05.1997	Update of v3.0; allows installation under Windows 95.	4330196
v3.2	10.1997	Released together with the new PG 720P, PG740 and PG760 programming consoles	4334123
v4.01	01.12.1998	Allows installation under Win95 or Win NT 4.0	4338386
v5.0	06.04.1999	Allows installation under Win95, Win98 or Win NT 4.0	4348386
v5.1	10.08.2000	New functions: block consistency check, configuration of system error reporting functions, etc. Initially released only for Win95, Win98, Win NT4.0, later allowed installation under Windows 2000	4900068
v5.2	19.01.2003	MS Windows 95, 98, Me, NT4 Workstation, 2000 Professional and also MS Windows XP Professional. It was the last version that allowed installation under Windows operating systems older than Windows XP and for this reason it was maintained for a long time, in parallel with v5.3	14191321
v5.3	27.02.2004	Introduces a new license concept, Floating License, which can be installed on a server and accessed in turn by several users on the same network, as well as a free test license, valid for 14 days. It allows installation only under Windows 2000 Professional or Windows XP Professional.	18588571
v5.4	06/27/2006	In addition to improvements to existing functions, it introduces the possibility of protecting projects using SIMATIC Logon. Installation possible under Windows 2000 Professional SP4, XP Professional SP1 or SP2, Windows Server 2003	22445076
v5.4	26.09.2006	v5.4 SP1: Various improvements compared to v5.4. Installation possible under Windows 2000 Professional SP4, Windows XP Professional SP1 or SP2, Windows Server 2003 (incl. SP1).	22445425
v5.4	06/19/2007	v5.4 SP2: Various improvements compared to previous versions. Installation possible under Windows 2000 Professional SP4, Windows XP Professional SP1 or SP2, Windows Server 2003 (incl. SP1 or SP2). Starting with 5.4SP2 the license is delivered on a USB stick, instead of the authorization diskette.	22445954
v5.4	18.10.2007	v5.4 SP3: Various improvements compared to previous versions. Installation possible under Windows 2000 Professional SP4, XP Professional SP2, Windows Server 2003 SP2, Windows Vista 32b Ultimate or Business.	22446648
v5.4	10.09.2008	v5.4 SP4: Various improvements compared to previous versions. Installation possible under Windows XP Pro SP2, Windows Server 2003 SP2, Windows Vista 32b Ultimate or Business.	29753194
v5.4	28.05.2009	v5.4 SP5: Various improvements compared to previous versions. Installation possible under Windows XP Pro SP2 or SP3, Windows Server 2003 SP2, Windows Vista 32b Ultimate or Business.	36184919
v5.4	-	In general, in version 5.4, installing a Service Pack can be done from scratch, without the need for a previous version to already be installed	
v5.5	30.08.2010	In addition to improvements to existing functions, it introduces the possibility of using a CPU as an I-Device, subordinate to another CPU in the network, the use of modules in Shared Device mode, the creation of user web pages in the Web server in the CPU as well as the possibility of encrypting the program in the CPU. Installation possible under Windows XP Professional SP2 or SP3, Windows Server 2003 SP2 / R2 SP2, Windows 7 32b Ultimate, Professional or Enterprise (not Windows Vista).	44370501
v5.5	28.09.2011	v5.5 SP1: Various improvements, hardware catalog update with new units. Installation possible under Windows XP Professional SP2 or SP3, Windows Server 2003 R2 SP2, Windows 7 32-Bit Ultimate, Professional or Enterprise, Windows 7 64-Bit Ultimate, Professional or Enterprise, Windows Server 2008 R2 (64 Bit).	52336355
v5.5	18.01.2012	v5.5 SP2: Update of the hardware catalog with the new units, various improvements such as configuration of ProfiNet devices with multiple ProfiNet interfaces, PROFINET ring configurations with "Media Redundancy with Path Duplication", etc. Installation possible under Windows XP Professional SP2 or SP3, Windows Server 2003 R2 SP2, Windows 7 32-Bit Ultimate, Professional or Enterprise, Windows 7 64-Bit Ultimate, Professional or Enterprise, Windows Server 2008 R2 (64 Bit).	57026032
v5.5	2013	v5.5 SP3: Allows Multiple Rings, according to Media Redundancy Protocol etc.	-
v5.5	16.06.2014	v5.5 SP4: multi-controller devices, etc.	93842005
v5.6	01.06.2017	It makes minor changes compared to previous versions but allows installation under Windows 10 Professional or Enterprise, Windows Server 2012.	109749362
v5.6	26.10.2018	v5.6 SP1: New functions for CPU410, support for GSDML schema 2.35, etc.	109760423
v5.6	20.12.2019	v5.6 SP2: Allows installation also under Windows Server 2019.	109772208
v5.7	28.06.2021	Update to allow installation on the latest editions of Windows 10 and Windows Server 2019. Security-related changes.	109796156

=== STEP 7 integrated in TIA Portal ===
(starting with v10)

In April 2009, Siemens initiated a generational change in the Simatic S7 controllers by launching, first, the S7-1200 controller family. For their programming, a new version of the programming software was also released, initially called STEP7 Basic V10.5. Later, with the launch of version 11, the new software version was integrated into a complex development environment called TIA Portal (Totally Integrated Automation Portal), which includes, in addition to STEP 7, the WinCC packages (for programming operator panels), StartDrive (for parameterizing variable speed drives) as well as optional modules, depending on the version.

In the versions integrated in the TIA Portal, STEP 7 offers various options for configuring and debugging PLCs:

Hardware Editor: For configuring the automation system and parameterizing the modules that are settable.

Symbol Editor: For defining the global tags used, the symbolic names, data types and comments for them.

S7-PLCSIM: A simulator of Simatic S7 systems that allows testing an automation project in a virtual environment.

Program editor: For editing user programs using one of the standardized PLC programming languages (according to EN 61131-3):

- LAD (LADder logic, called KOP = Kontaktplan in German or LD according to IEC 61131-3). It is a graphical language according to DIN 19239 in which the user program is represented similar to an electrical diagram (American format - ladder diagram).
- FBD (Function Block Diagram, FBS – Funktionsbausteinsprache in German or FDB according to IEC 61131-3; similar to the CSF language from STEP 5). It is a graphical language according to DIN 40700 in which the user program is represented similar to an electronic diagram with logic gates.

Under TIA Portal (especially for S7 1200 and S7 1500 PLCs) the LAD and FDB languages offer a complete set of instructions and the program is transferred to the PLC directly in the language it was written in. Program blocks can be converted from LAD to FDB or vice versa but can no longer be converted directly into other languages (in STEP 7 versions v1.x to v5.x for S7 300 and S7 400 the program was interpreted in STL and LAD and FBD were program display modes).

- SCL (Structured Control Language, ST according to IEC 61131-3). It is a high-level language, based on the PASCAL language, which allows the use of complex language structures such as REPEAT-UNTIL, WHILE-DO, IF-THEN-ELSE, CASE, etc.
- Graph (Sequential Function Chart, SFC according to IEC 61131-3). A graphical programming language, which allows the implementation of sequential control structures, based on the concept of binary Petri nets. An S7-Graph program consists of a number of steps, each step having associated PLC program actions / equations, and a number of transitions that allow the transition from a certain step to another when certain conditions are met.
- STL (STatement List, called AWL = Anweisungliste in German or IL = Instruction List according to IEC 61131-3). It is a low level language, according to DIN 19239, similar to assembly language, with an extensive set of instructions that offers great flexibility in writing and optimizing the program. Control of program execution is achieved using Jump, BE instructions and function calls. Under TIA Portal, the STL language was implemented especially to allow the migration of projects developed in older versions (STEP 7 v5.x for example).
- CFC (Continuous Function Chart, Siemens specific, not IEC 61131-3 standard). A graphical editor used to create the entire PLC program structure from ready-to-program library blocks. In the editor, these blocks are selected in graphs, parameterized and interconnected. CFCs are mainly used for continuous process control, where complex open- or closed-loop control tasks can be easily mapped into CFC.
- CEM (Cause Effect Matrix) is a graphical programming language in which cause-effect relationships are directly defined. The program is defined in the form of a matrix in which various process events, called causes, trigger certain reactions, called effects.

TIA Portal History (excerpt):

STEP 7 History in TIA Portal (excerpt)
Version	Released in	Description	SIOS ID
v10.5	21.04.2009	SIMATIC STEP7 Basic v10.5 only for S7 1200	36524193
v11.0	21.04.2011	TIA Portal STEP 7 v11.0 for S7 1200, S7 300 and S7 400.	49639088
v12.0	27.02.2013	TIA Portal STEP 7 v12.0 for S7 1500, S7 1200, S7 300 and S7 400 (allows programming of S7 1500 PLCs released in the same period).	67851956
v12.0	01.03.2013	The TIA StartDrive v12 package is also released for parameterizing drives in the TIA Portal (in addition to the already existing STARTER software.	-
v12.0	08.04.2013	The TIA WinCC v12 package is also released for parameterizing HMI systems: operator panels or PC systems.	-
v12.0	07.2013	SP1 for STEP 7 v12, WinCC v12, StartDrive v12.	-
v12.0	26.08.2013	PID Professional for STEP7 v12 SP1: optional software package.	-
v12.0	18.09.2013	Simatic STEP 7 Safety Advanced v12: optional software package for functional safety applications.	-
v12.0	07.10.2013	Easy Motion Control v12 for STEP 7 v12: optional software package.	-
v13	28.02.2014	TIA Portal SIMATIC STEP 7 Professional / Basic V13 TIA StartDrive v13 for parameterizing drives in the TIA Portal.	84047138
v13	08.05.2014	the TIA WinCC v13 package is also released for parameterizing HMI systems: operator panels or PC systems.	-
v13	21.03.2014	Simatic STEP 7 Safety Advanced v13: optional software package for functional safety applications.	-
v13	24.03.2014	PID Professional for STEP7 v13 and Easy Motion Control v13: optional software packages.	-
v13	09-16.01.2015	SP1 for STEP 7, Safety Advanced, WinCC, Start Drive v13.	-
v13	31.03.2017	SP2 for WinCC V13. Released simultaneously with SP1 for TIA v14. Allows installation under Windows 10.	109746073
v13	04.04.2017	SP2 for StartDrive V13.	109746258
v14	30.09.2016	TIA Portal V14. Includes SIMATIC STEP 7 V14, SIMATIC STEP 7 Safety V14, SIMATIC WinCC V14, SINAMICS Startdrive V14, SIMOTION SCOUT TIA V4.5 HF1. The package includes many new options such as: TIA Portal Multiuser Engineering; TIA Portal Teamcenter Gateway; TIA Portal Cloud Connector; SIMATIC Energy Suite; SIMATIC ODK 1500S; SIMATIC Target 1500S™ for Simulink®; SIMATIC Visualization Architect; WinCC/WebUX	109739471
v14	31.03.2017	TIA Portal V14 SP1. Includes SIMATIC STEP 7 V14 SP1, SIMATIC STEP 7 Safety V14 SP1, SIMATIC WinCC V14 SP1, SINAMICS Startdrive V14 SP1, SIMOTION SCOUT TIA V5.1, SIMOCODE ES V14 SP1, Soft Starter ES V14 SP1. Support for S7T Technology CPU, Simatic Ident as a technology object, possibility to read a safety program from the PLC, etc. Allows installation under Windows 10.	109739471
v15	21.12.2017	TIA Portal V15. Includes SIMATIC STEP 7 V15, SIMATIC STEP 7 Safety V15, SIMATIC WinCC V15, SINAMICS Startdrive V15, SIMOTION SCOUT TIA V5.2 SP1, SIMOCODE ES V15, Soft Starter ES V15	109752224
v15.1	26.10.2018	TIA Portal V15.1. Includes SIMATIC STEP 7 V15.1, SIMATIC STEP 7 Safety V15.1, SIMATIC WinCC V15.1, SINAMICS Startdrive V15.1, SINAMICS DCC V15.1, SIMOTION SCOUT TIA V5.3 SP1, SIMOCODE ES V15.1, Soft Starter ES V15.1 Introduces support for SIMATIC High Availability S7-1500R/H controllers. Introduces the concept of "Software Units" for dividing the PLC program into units with separate loading.	109758794
v16	02.12.2019	TIA Portal V16. Includes SIMATIC STEP 7 V16, SIMATIC STEP 7 Safety V16, SIMATIC WinCC V16, WinCC Unified V16, SINAMICS Startdrive V16, SINAMICS DCC V16, SIMOCODE ES V16, Soft Starter ES V16 Introduces the new WinCC Unified system for HMI.	109771626
v17	28.05.2021	TIA Portal V17. Includes SIMATIC STEP 7 V17, SIMATIC STEP 7 Safety V17, SIMATIC WinCC V17, WinCC Unified V17, SINAMICS Startdrive V17, SIMOTION SCOUT TIA V5.4 SP3, SIMOCODE ES V17, SIRIUS Soft Starter ES V17, SIRIUS Safety ES V17: Hardware: new CPU units such as CPU 1518HF-4 PN (high availability, fail-safety) and CPU 1518T(F)-4 PN/DP (S7-Technology, control of up to 192 axes, fail-safe).; Hardware: TM MFP (MultiFunctional Platform technology module), module for integrating IT applications into engineering systems (OT); Intel Atom, Linux (SIMATIC Industrial OS based on Debian 11).; OPC UA server: Alarms & Conditions; Activation/deactivation of I-Device mode in runtime; DHCP and DNS for S7-1500 (and ET200 CPU); CEM (cause effect matrix) programming language: graphical programming using a cause-effect matrix; CFC (Continuous Function Chart) programming language; The group structure (directories/folders) for organizing blocks, PLC data types and variables (PLC tags) is transferred to the PLC and can be restored when reading the project directly from the PLC (download PLC -> PC); SIMATIC Safe Kinematics; STEP7 Safety Fast Commissioning (minor changes to the fail-safe program without switching the CPU to Stop); SIMATIC Robot Library; TIA-Portal Multiuser	109784438
v18	24.11.2022	TIA Portal V18. Includes SIMATIC STEP 7 V18, TIA Portal Cloud V3.0, SIMATIC STEP 7 Safety V18, SIMATIC WinCC V18, WinCC Unified V18, SIMATIC WinCC Unified PC RT (for simulating WinCC Unified systems), SINAMICS Startdrive V18, SIMOTION SCOUT TIA V5.5 SP1, SIMOCODE ES V18, SIRIUS Soft Starter ES V18, SIRIUS Safety ES V18: Standalone editor for library management; Version control interface (VCI Version Control Interface) that allows VCI, GIT, etc. with TIA Portal; A new graphical interface for S7-PLCSIM / S7-PLCSIM Advanced. Allows Multiadapter (only in PLCSIM Advanced); Possibility to program fail-safe in Software Units; Improvements to the integrated oscilloscope (Trace): long-term recording (long term trace) and possibility of FFT (Fast-Fourier-Transformation) analysis, in addition to Bode analysis (for Sinamics S120 drives with CU3x0-2); Technology (S7-T): Kinematics with up to 6 interpolated axes (e.g. 6 joints); Technology: advanced programming with references to Technology Objects (TO references)	109807106
v19	24.11.2023	TIA Portal V19. Includes SIMATIC STEP 7 V19, SIMATIC STEP 7 Safety V19, SIMATIC WinCC V19, WinCC Unified V19, SINAMICS Startdrive V19, SIMOTION SCOUT TIA V5.6 SP1, TIA Portal Cloud v4.0, SIMOCODE ES V19 (Jan.2024), SIRIUS Soft Starter ES V19 (Jan.2024), SIRIUS Safety ES V19 (Jan.2024): Optimized for 4k resolution screens (300DPI resolution); S7-1500 SW v30.0/v30.1 (PLC Software) under Linux (Siemens Industrial OS - based on Debian 11) or Windows (W10 LTSC 2021); S7-1500V (Virtual Controller CPU1517V-1PN): Simatic CPU in Docker; WinCC Advanced, Professional and Unified (engineering) programming on the same PC; Kiosk mode for WinCC Unified RT (function available in WinCC Advanced, e.g.); WinCC Unified: HMI->PLC time synchronization (function available in WinCC Advanced, e.g.); WinCC Unified Corporate Design; StartDrive: new Sinamics S200, S210, G220 drives; long-term trace recording; Shared Device integrated into the project (makes it easier to integrate a separate PLC for Safety Integrated safety functions; Shared Device is also possible in earlier versions); STEP7 Technology: Simatic Motion Interpreter; TIA Portal Project Upgrader: solution based on TIA Portal Openess for upgrading old projects (but > v13) to v19 (SIOS 109811744)	109821307
v20	05.12.2024	TIA Portal V20. Includes SIMATIC STEP 7 V20, SIMATIC STEP 7 Safety V20, SIMATIC WinCC V20, WinCC Unified V20, WinCC Unified PC RT, SINAMICS Startdrive V20, SIMOTION SCOUT TIA V5.7 SP1, TIA Portal Cloud v5.0, SIMOCODE ES V20, SIRIUS Soft Starter ES V20, SIRIUS Safety ES V20: Support for S7-1200 G2 (second generation of S7-1200 programmable controllers); Support for new S7-1500 variants 1517(F), 1518(F) (new HW versions with FW4.0); Step7: Possibility (for blocks written in LAD, F-LAD, DB and UDT language) to import or export code and comments in a text format (universal regardless of TIA version).; Step7: NVT (Named Value Types): Improvements related to online monitoring, including in "Trace", use as "Library Types", etc.; Step7: Various editor improvements.; WinCC Unified: Use of difference-only compilation for speed increase (implemented since v19 SP1); WinCC Unified: Optimization of the use of high-resolution images (rescaling to the size used in the project); WinCC Unified: Possibility of using Expressions in dynamization (in addition to script); WinCC Unified: Start/Stop functions for logs; WinCC Unified: Dynamic Widget (new graphic elements); WinCC Unified: For connection via OPC UA: Possibility of calling Methods (Method Call: similar to RPC Call) from an OPC UA server; WinCC Unified: Support for SIMATIC CFL (Control Function Library) as well as MTP (Module Type Package) packages (SIOS 109811744); WinCC Unified: Various improvements to the editor.; Step7 Technology: Support for the new CPU units S7-1500 1516T(F) / 1517T(F) / 1518T(F) with FW4.0, Simatic Software Controller 1508S T(F); TIA Portal Cloud v5.0 (Integration of TIA Portal in the cloud, also includes TIA v20); S7-Web Server: Implementation of JSON Web API (access to more data from the PLC without having to use SFC99 (www) or the system DB block). This creates an independence between the PLC code and the web page.; PROFINET: Improvements for IRT: PROFINET Dynamic Frame Packing (DFP); TIA documentation online: https://docs.tia.siemens.cloud	109963848
v21	04.12.2025	TIA Portal V21. Includes SIMATIC STEP 7 V21, SIMATIC STEP 7 Safety V21, SIMATIC WinCC V21, WinCC Unified V21, WinCC Unified PC RT, SINAMICS Startdrive V21, TIA Portal Cloud v6.0, SIMOCODE ES V21, SIRIUS Soft Starter ES V21, SIRIUS Safety ES V21: STEP 7: Version Control Interface (connection and use of any versioning system e.g. SVN, GIT together with TIA Portal): Versioning of libraries is supported, Export/import in SIMATIC SD (SIMATIC source document) format is supported also for SCL and FBD blocks (already supported since v20: LAD, DB, F-DB, UDT and F-UDT).; STEP 7: Download of DB changes without reinitialization: "Keep actual values" action is now offered in the "Load preview" dialog for S7-1500 FW 4.1, with some restrictions.; STEP 7: Improved filters for global search, extended functions for Named Value Data Types (NVT); Motion Control: Multicore support for optimising Technology Objects system performance.; Motion Control: Enhanced trace functionality for Technology Objects.; WinCC Unified: WinCC Unified Runtime Server Redundancy for increased plant availability.; WinCC Unified: Enhanced Screen Editor, Tag optimization, Object properties; WinCC Unified: New object types: Alarm Indicator and Alarm Line (existing in previous HMI engineering systems WinCC Flexible, Comfort, Advanced but missing in previous versions of WinCC Unified); TIA Portal: Migration of older projects: As of TIA Portal V21, neither projects nor intermediate migration files can be migrated directly. Project may be migrated to TIA Portal v14, v15, v15.1 or v16 using the integrated migration tool or to v17, v18, v19 or v20 using external migration tool, then the project may be upgraded to v21.; TIA Portal: Option to activate Engineering Copilot TIA Standard, an AI-supported assistant for engineering in the TIA Portal. Requires a license.; TIA Portal: User Management & Access Control (UMAC): various improvements; TIA Portal Openness: New modular TIA Portal Openness libraries with simplified assembly management; StartDrive: Support for SINAMICS S220 with CU320-3	109989772
