= List of 2016–17 NBA season transactions =

This is a list of transactions that have taken place during the offseason and the 2016–17 NBA season.

== Retirements ==
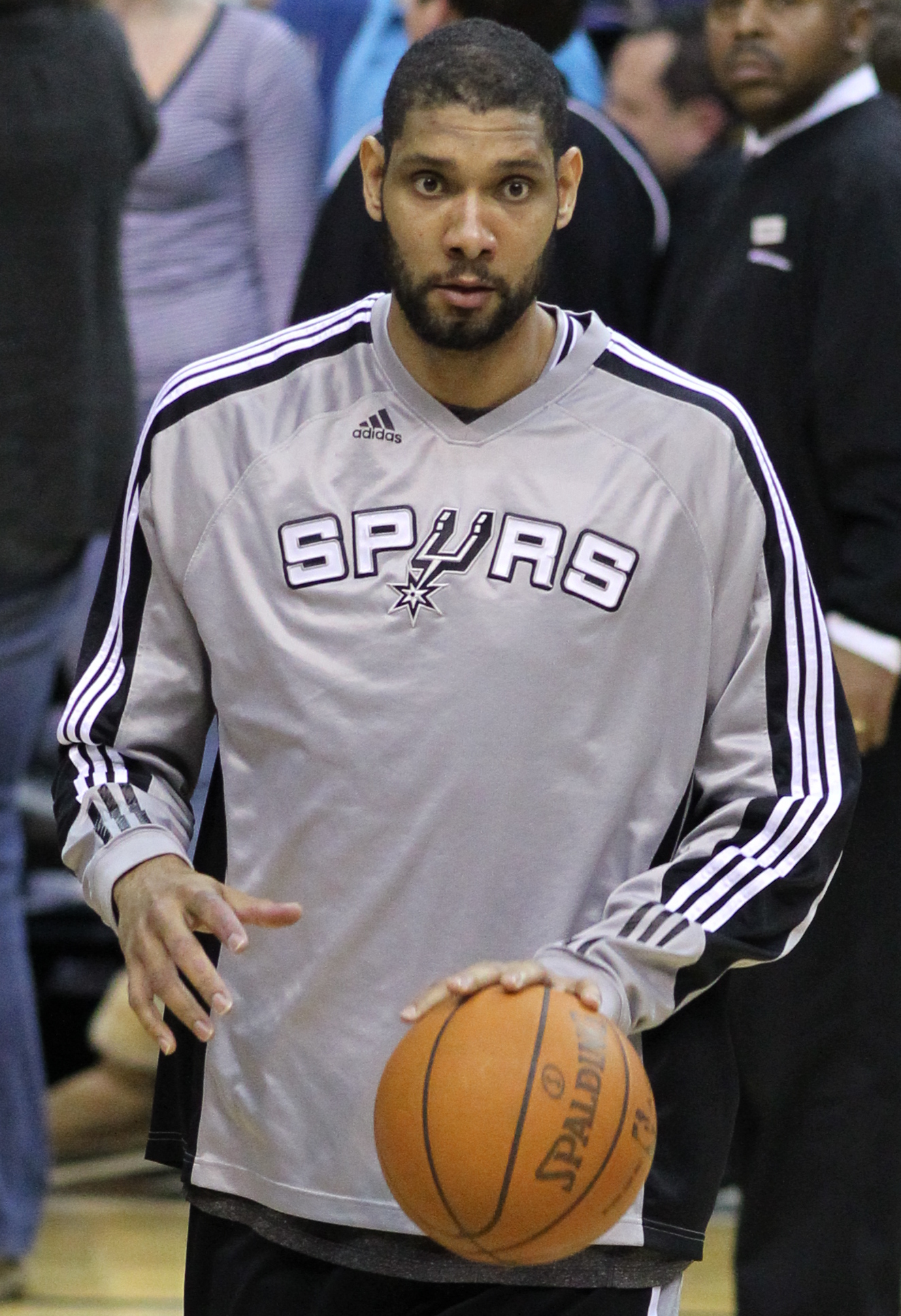
Tim Duncan with the San Antonio Spurs.

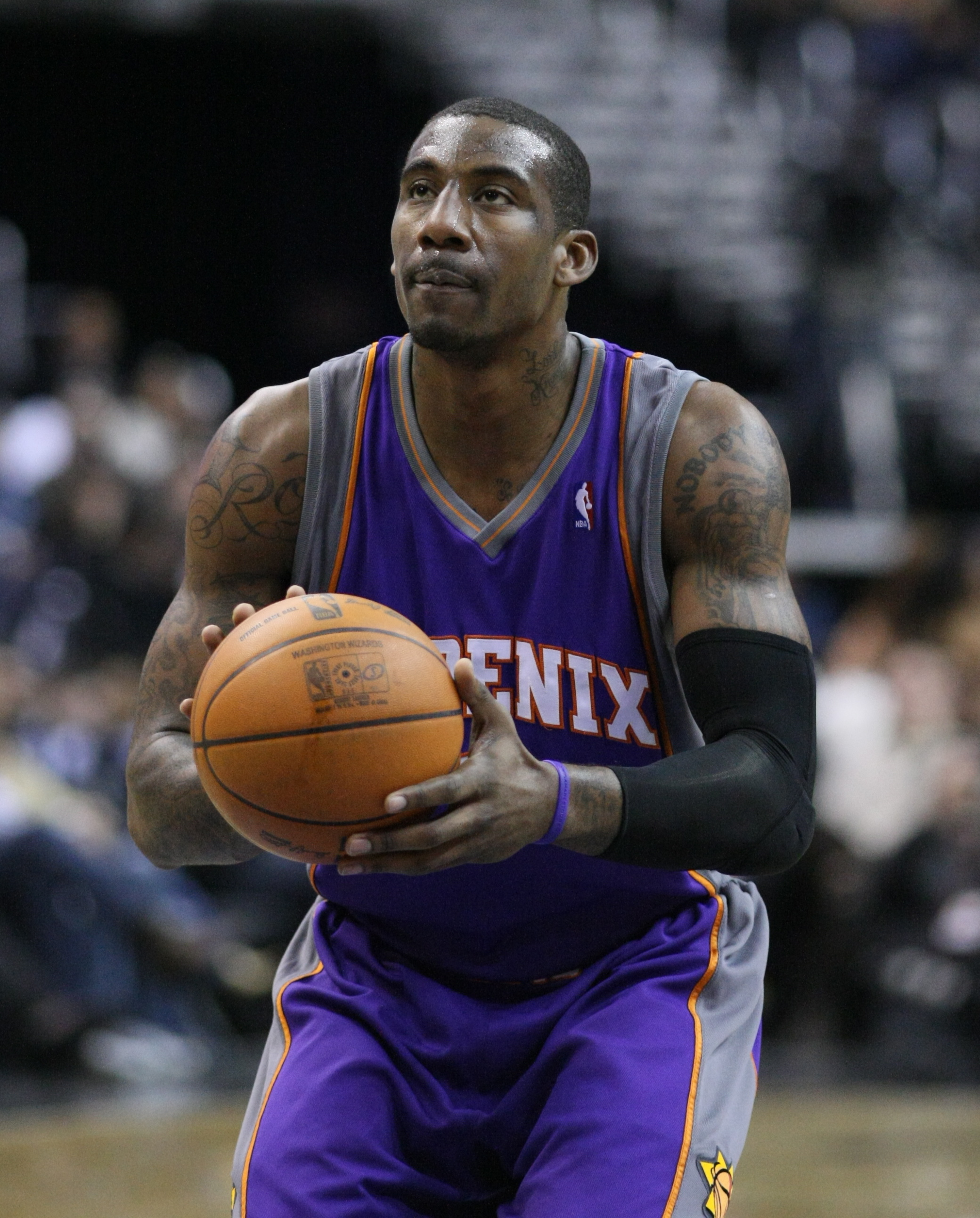
Amar'e Stoudemire with the Phoenix Suns.

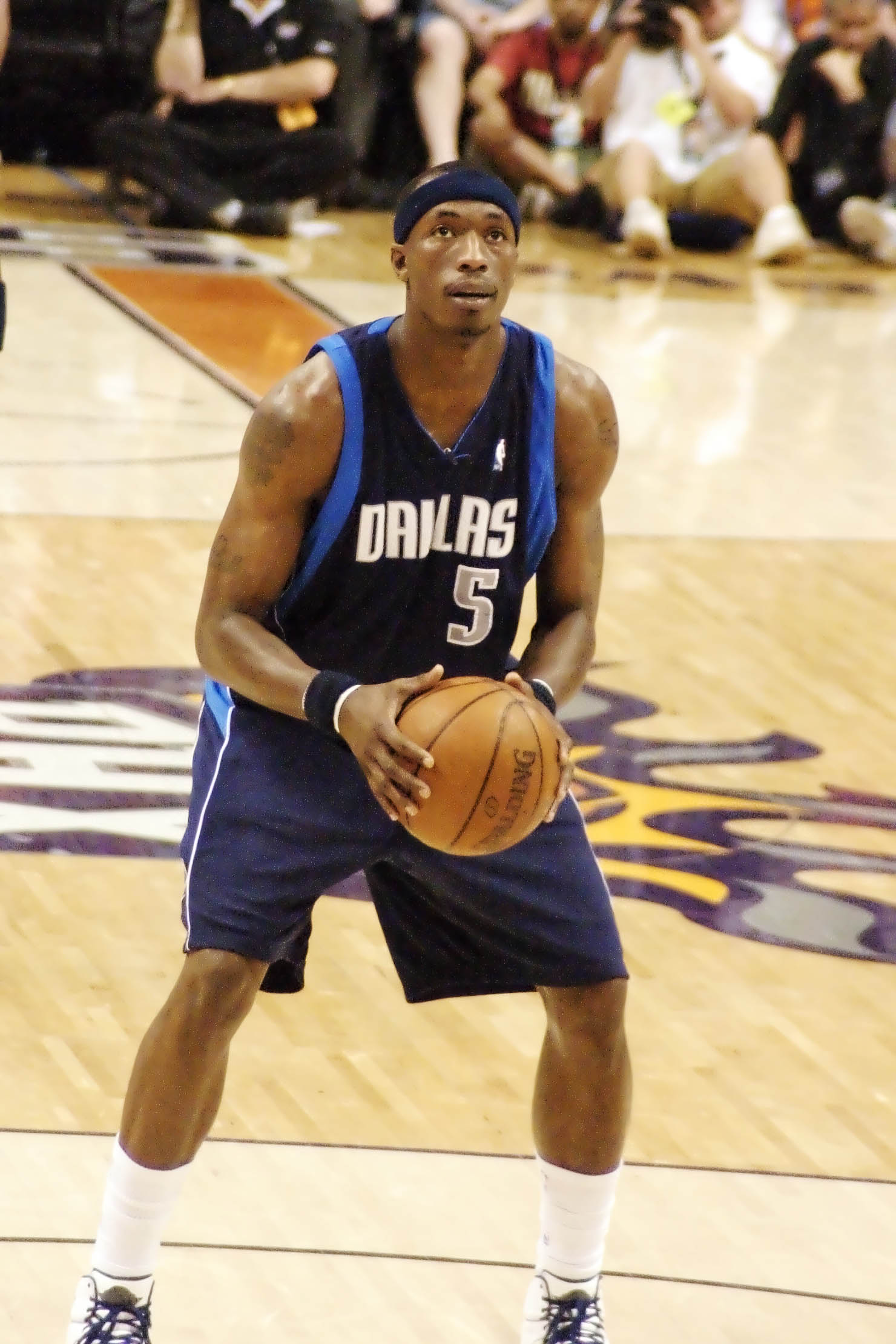
Josh Howard with the Dallas Mavericks.

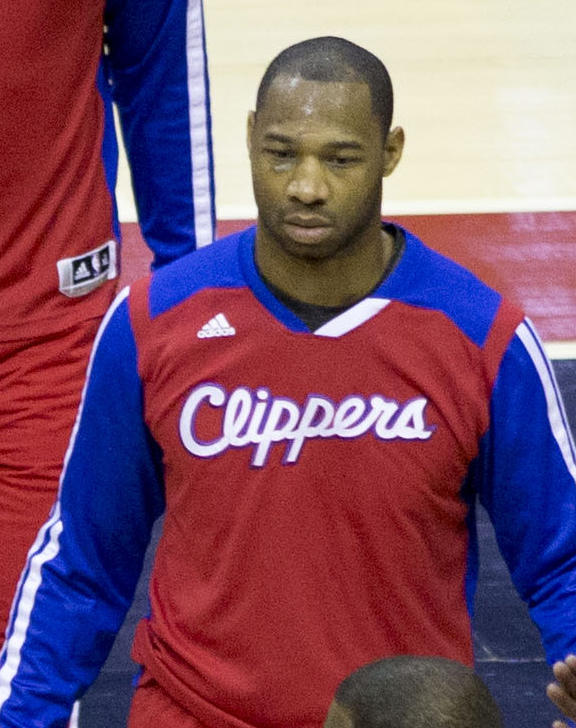
Willie Green with the Los Angeles Clippers.

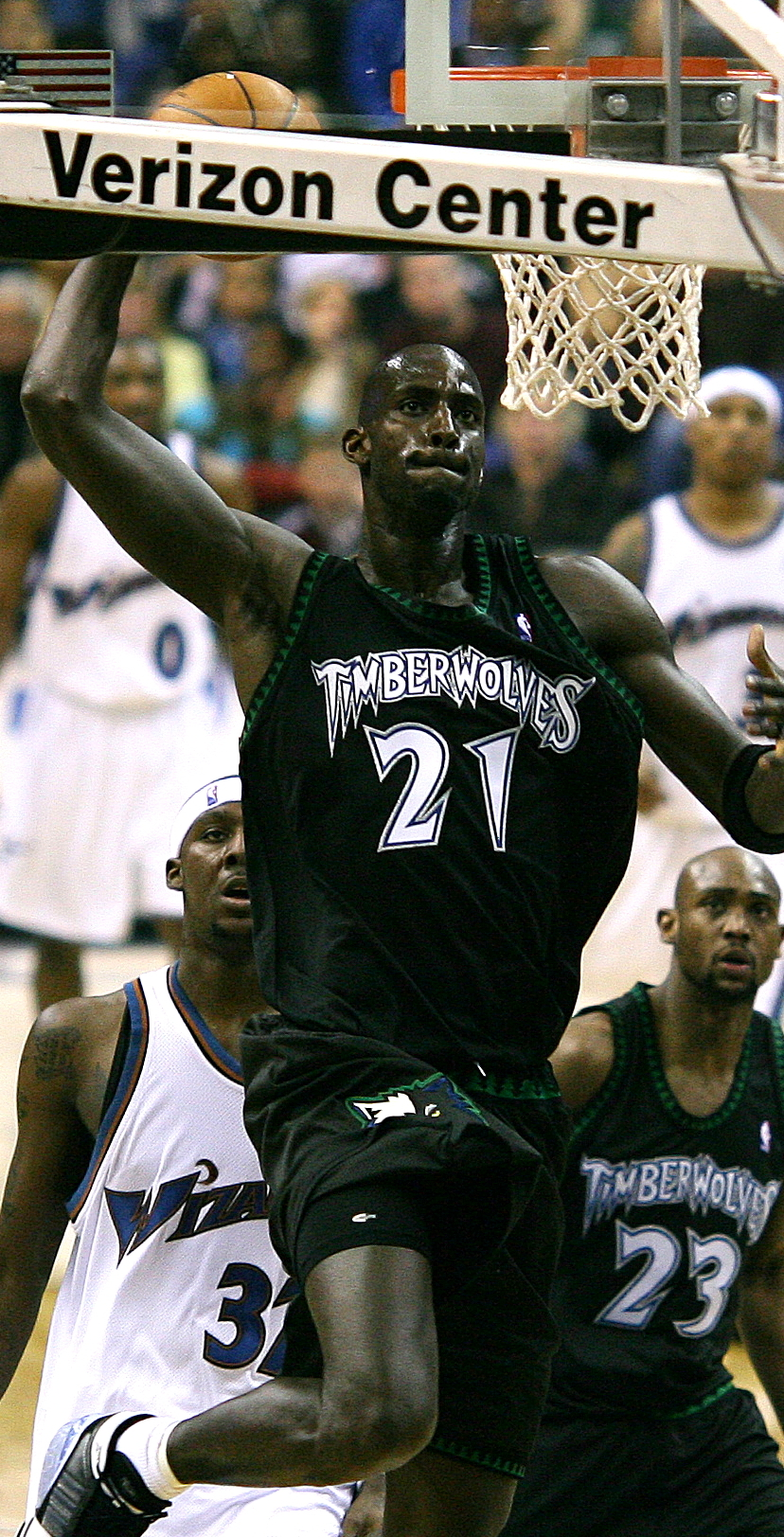
Kevin Garnett with the Minnesota Timberwolves.

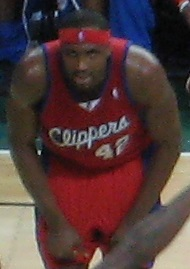
Elton Brand with the Los Angeles Clippers.

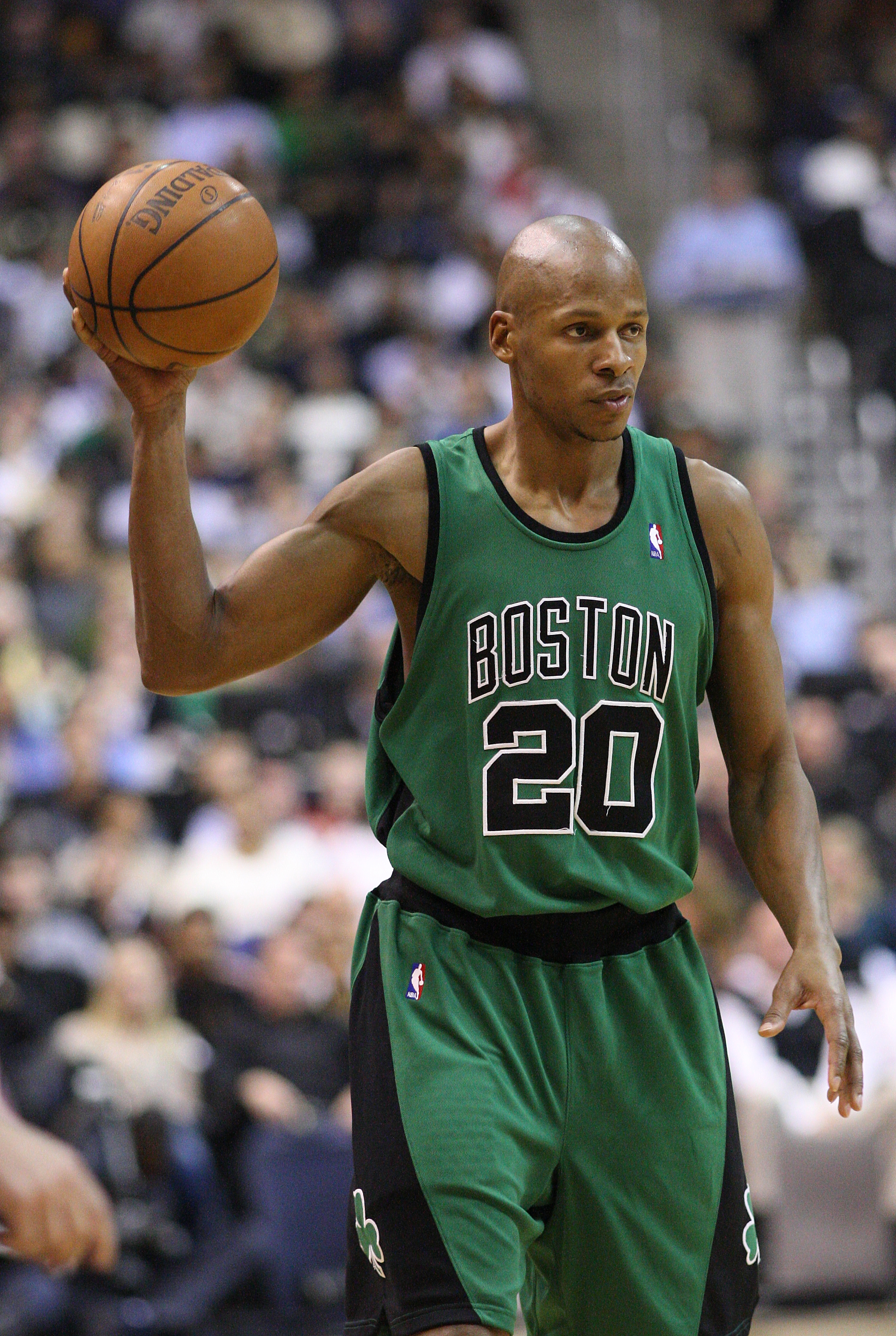
Ray Allen with the Boston Celtics.

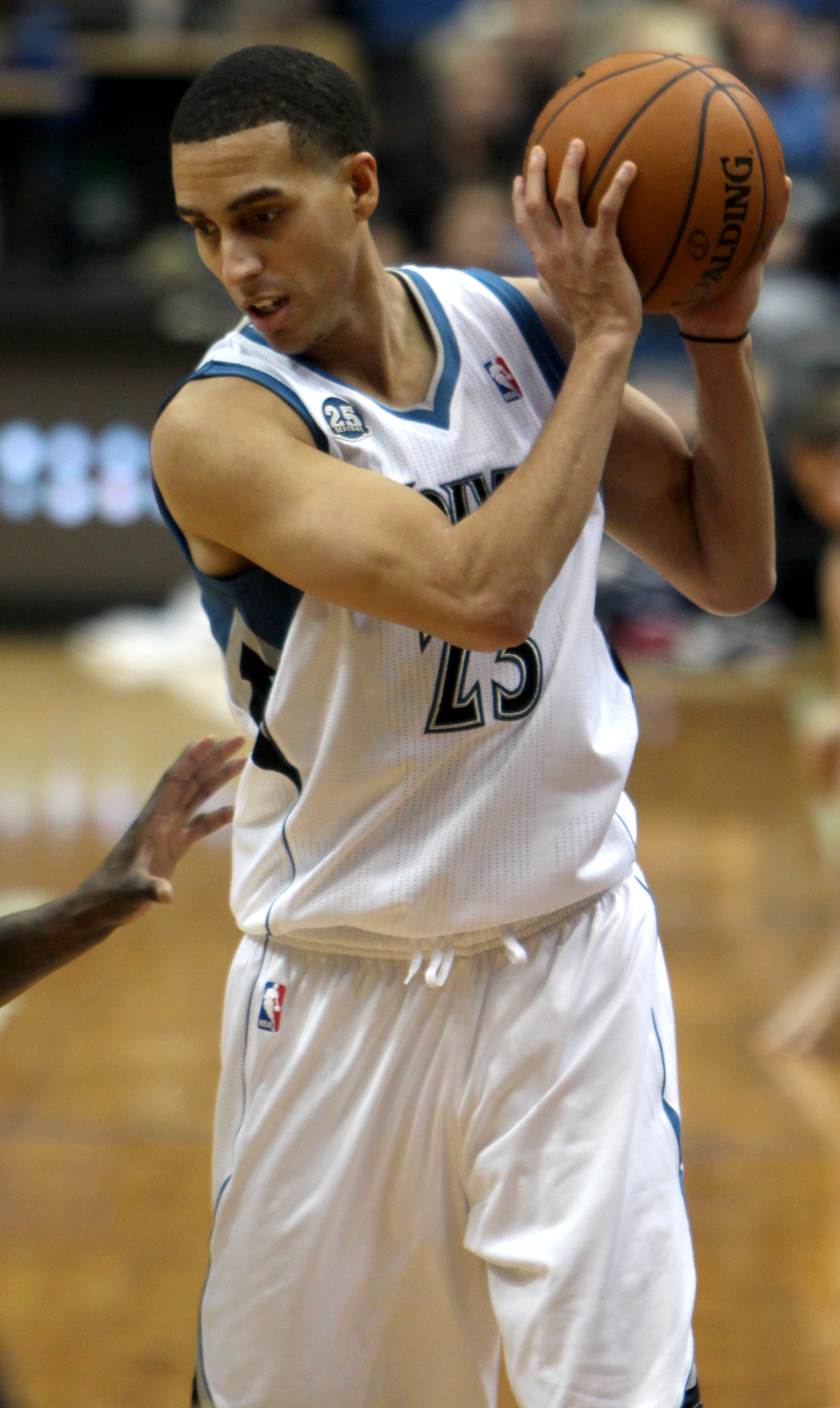
Kevin Martin with the Minnesota Timberwolves.

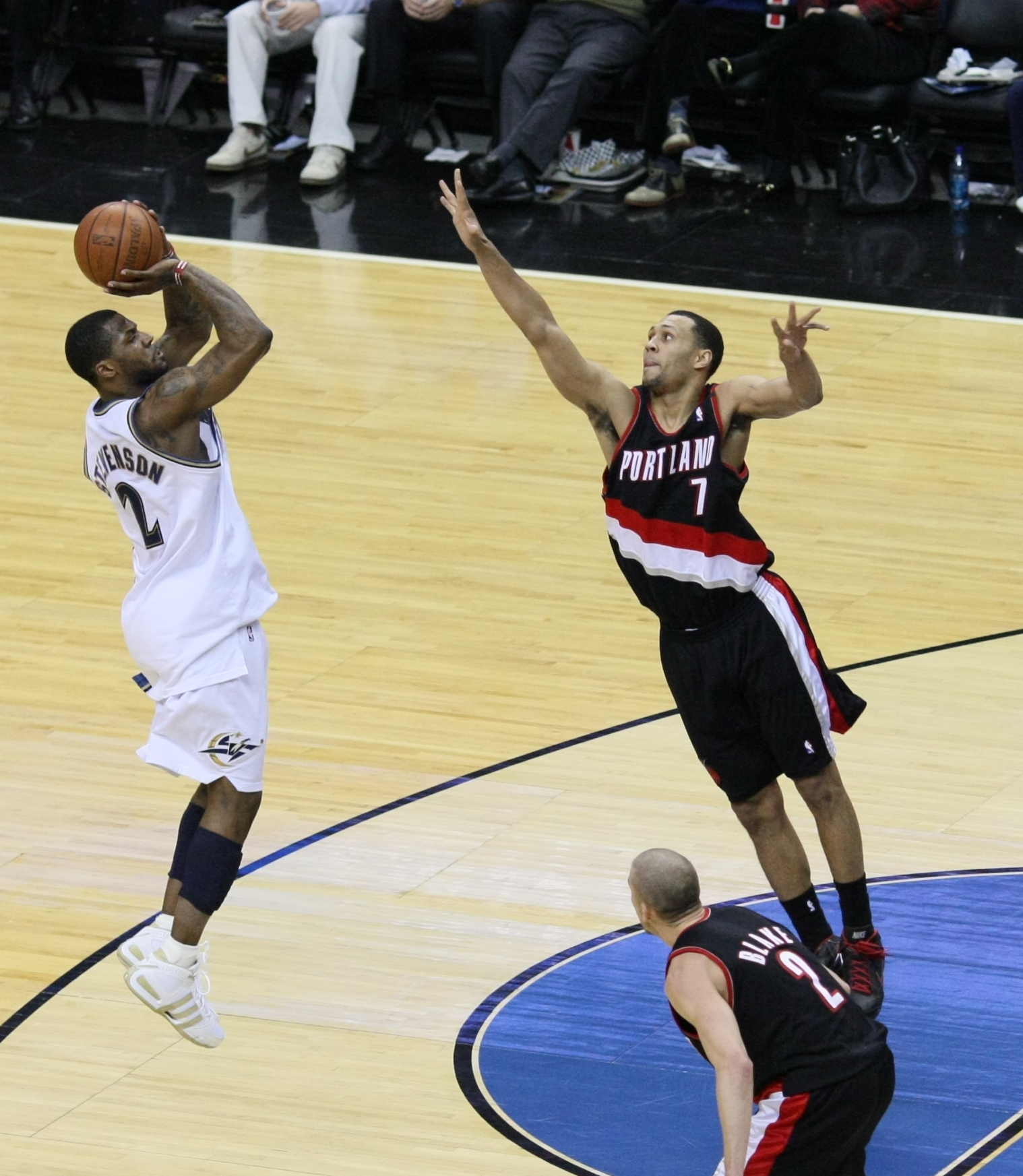
DeShawn Stevenson (left) with the Washington Wizards.

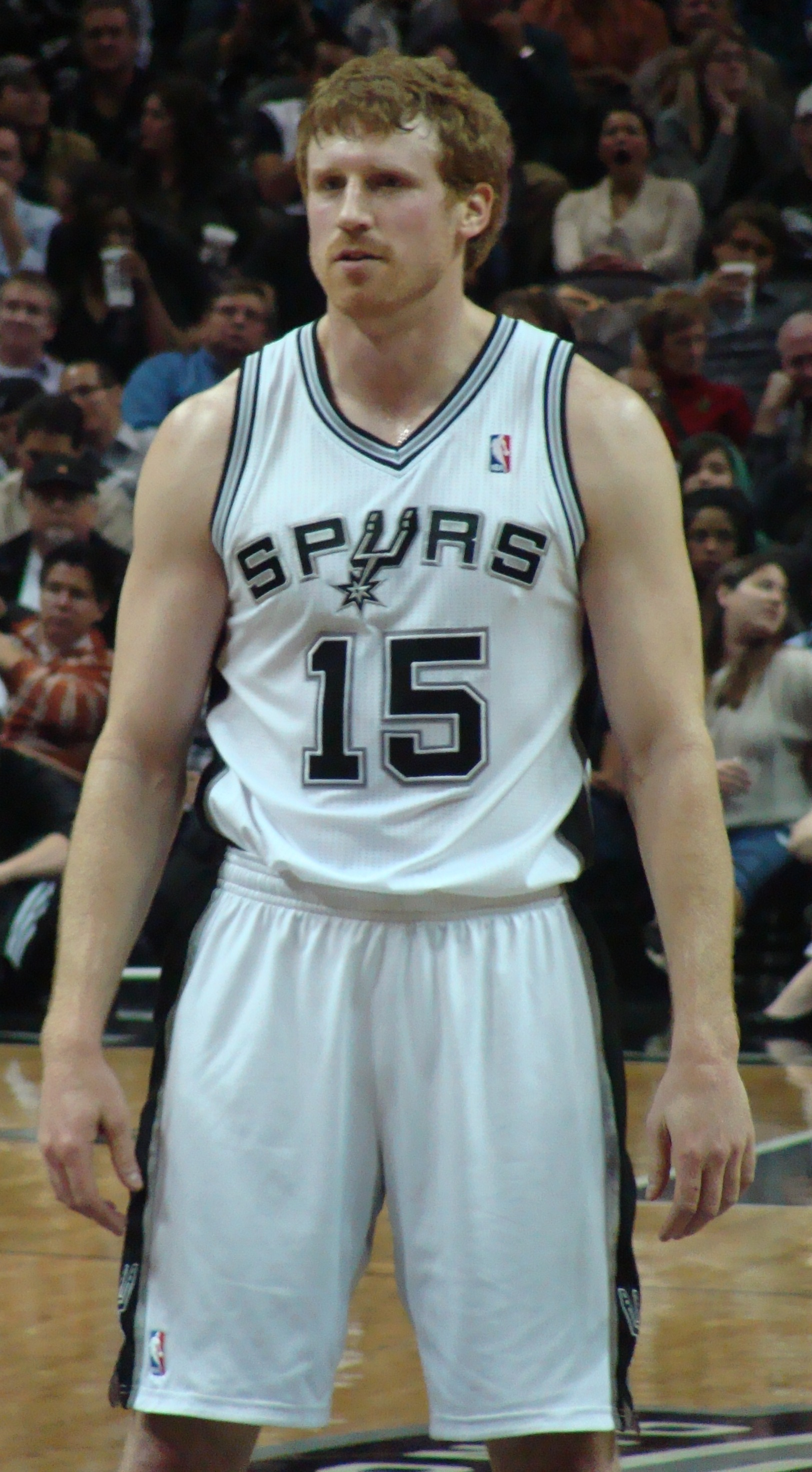
Matt Bonner with the San Antonio Spurs.

| Date | Name | Team(s) played (years) | Age | Notes | Ref. |
|---|---|---|---|---|---|
| May 22 | Raül López | Utah Jazz (2002–2005) | 36 | Also played overseas. | |
| May 24 | Mario West | Atlanta Hawks (2007–2009, 2010); New Jersey Nets (2011) | 31 | Also played on D-League and overseas. Hired as director of player personnel for Georgia Tech. | |
| June 22 | Luke Ridnour | Seattle SuperSonics (2003–2008); Milwaukee Bucks (2008–2010; 2013–2014); Minnesota Timberwolves (2010–2013); Charlotte Bobcats (2014); Orlando Magic (2014–2015) | 35 | | |
| June 27 | Paul Davis | Los Angeles Clippers (2006–2009); Washington Wizards (2009) | 31 | Also played on D-League and overseas. | |
| July 11 | Tim Duncan | San Antonio Spurs (1997–2016) | 40 | 5× NBA champion (1999, 2003, 2005, 2007, 2014); 3× NBA Finals MVP (1999, 2003, 2005); 2× NBA Most Valuable Player (2002–2003); 16× NBA All-Star (1998–2011, 2013, 2015); NBA All-Star Game co-MVP (2000); 10× All-NBA First Team (1998–2005, 2007, 2013); 3× All-NBA Second Team (2006, 2008, 2009); 2× All-NBA Third Team (2010, 2015); 8× NBA All-Defensive First Team (1999–2003, 2005, 2007, 2008); 7× NBA All-Defensive Second Team (1998, 2004, 2006, 2009, 2010, 2013, 2015); NBA Rookie of the Year (1998); NBA All-Rookie First Team (1998); NBA Teammate of the Year (2015); No. 21 retired by San Antonio Spurs | |
| July 25 | Sasha Kaun | Cleveland Cavaliers (2015–2016) | 31 | NBA champion (2016); Also played on D-League and in Russia. | |
| July 26 | Amar'e Stoudemire | Phoenix Suns (2002–2010); New York Knicks (2010–2015); Dallas Mavericks (2015); Miami Heat (2015–2016) | 33 | 6× NBA All-Star (2005, 2007–2011); All-NBA First Team (2007); 4× All-NBA Second Team (2005, 2008, 2010–2011); NBA Rookie of the Year (2003); NBA All-Rookie First Team (2003); No. 32 retired by Phoenix Suns; Also played overseas | |
| July 31 | Josh Howard | Dallas Mavericks (2003–2010); Washington Wizards (2010–2011); Utah Jazz (2011–2012); Minnesota Timberwolves (2012) | 36 | NBA All-Star (2007); All-NBA Rookie Second Team (2004); Also played on D-League. Hired as head coach by Piedmont International. | |
| August 9 | Willie Green | Philadelphia 76ers (2003–2010); New Orleans Hornets (2010–2011); Atlanta Hawks (2011–2012); Los Angeles Clippers (2012–2014); Orlando Magic (2014–2015) | 35 | Hired as assistant coach by the Golden State Warriors. | |
| August 23 | Ryan Gomes | Boston Celtics (2005–2007); Minnesota Timberwolves (2007–2010); Los Angeles Clippers (2010–2012); Oklahoma City Thunder (2013–2014) | 33 | NBA All-Rookie Second Team (2006); Also played on D-League and overseas. Hired as assistant coach by the Long Island Nets. | |
| September 9 | Chuck Hayes | Houston Rockets (2006–2011; 2015); Sacramento Kings (2011–2013); Toronto Raptors (2013–2015) | 33 | Also played on D-League. Hired as staff assistant and player development coach by the Denver Nuggets. | |
| September 16 | Landry Fields | New York Knicks (2010–2012); Toronto Raptors (2012–2015) | 28 | All-NBA Rookie First Team (2011); Hired as college scout by the San Antonio Spurs. | |
| September 23 | Kevin Garnett | Minnesota Timberwolves (1995–2007; 2015–2016); Boston Celtics (2007–2013); Brooklyn Nets (2013–2015) | 40 | NBA champion (2008); NBA Most Valuable Player (2004); 16× NBA All-Star (1997–2011, 2013); NBA Defensive Player of the Year (2008); 4× All-NBA First Team (2000, 2003, 2004, 2008); 3× All-NBA Second Team (2001, 2002, 2005); 2× All-NBA Third Team (1999, 2007); 9× NBA All-Defensive First Team (2000–2005, 2008, 2009, 2011); 3× NBA All-Defensive Second Team (2006, 2007, 2012); 4× NBA rebounding champion (2004–2007); NBA All-Rookie Second Team (1996); J. Walter Kennedy Citizenship Award (2006); No. 5 retired by Boston Celtics | |
| September 27 | Melvin Ely | Los Angeles Clippers (2002–2004); Charlotte Bobcats (2004–2007); San Antonio Spurs (2007); New Orleans Hornets (2007–2009); Denver Nuggets (2010–2011); New Orleans Pelicans (2014) | 38 | Also played on D-League and overseas. NBA champion (2007); Hired as assistant coach by the Canton Charge. | |
| October 20 | Elton Brand | Chicago Bulls (1999–2001); Los Angeles Clippers (2001–2008); Philadelphia 76ers (2008–2012; 2016); Dallas Mavericks (2012–2013); Atlanta Hawks (2013–2015) | 37 | 2x NBA All-Star (2002, 2006); All-NBA Second Team (2006); NBA Sportsmanship Award (2006); NBA Co-Rookie of the Year (2000); Hired as player development consultant by the Philadelphia 76ers. | |
| October 24 | Ronny Turiaf | Los Angeles Lakers (2006–2008); Golden State Warriors (2008–2010); New York Knicks (2010–2011); Washington Wizards (2011–2012); Miami Heat (2012); Los Angeles Clippers (2012–2013); Minnesota Timberwolves (2013–2014) | 33 | Also played overseas. NBA champion (2012) | |
| October 28 | Greg Oden | Portland Trail Blazers (2007–2012); Miami Heat (2013–2014) | 28 | Also played in China. Became a student at Ohio State and student manager afterwards. | |
| November 1 | Ray Allen | Milwaukee Bucks (1996–2003); Seattle SuperSonics (2003–2007); Boston Celtics (2007–2012); Miami Heat (2012–2014) | 41 | 2x NBA champion (2008, 2013); 10x NBA All-Star (2000–2002, 2004–2009, 2011); NBA Sportsmanship Award (2003); NBA's all-time leading 3-point scorer | |
| November 3 | Charlie Bell | Phoenix Suns (2001); Dallas Mavericks (2002); Milwaukee Bucks (2005–2010); Golden State Warriors (2010–2011) | 37 | Also played on the ABA and overseas. Hired as assistant coach by the Texas Legends. | |
| November 25 | Kevin Martin | Sacramento Kings (2004–2010); Houston Rockets (2010–2012); Oklahoma City Thunder (2012–2013); Minnesota Timberwolves (2013–2016); San Antonio Spurs (2016) | 33 | | |
| December 16 | Yaroslav Korolev | Los Angeles Clippers (2005–2007) | 29 | Also played on D-League and overseas. | |
| December 19 | DeShawn Stevenson | Utah Jazz (2000–2004); Orlando Magic (2004–2005); Washington Wizards (2005–2010); Dallas Mavericks (2010–2011); New Jersey Nets (2011–2012); Atlanta Hawks (2012–2013) | 35 | NBA champion (2011) | |
| January 6 | Matt Bonner | Toronto Raptors (2004–2006); San Antonio Spurs (2006–2016) | 36 | Also played in Italy. 2× NBA champion (2007, 2014); Became an analyst for San Antonio Spurs TV Broadcast. | |
| January 9 | Pablo Prigioni | New York Knicks (2012–2015); Houston Rockets (2015); Los Angeles Clippers (2015–2016) | 39 | Also played overseas. | |

== Front office movements ==
=== Head coach changes ===
Off-season

| Departure date | Team | Outgoing head coach | Reason for departure | Hire date | Incoming head coach | Last coaching position | Ref. |
|---|---|---|---|---|---|---|---|
| April 14 | Brooklyn Nets | Tony Brown | Interim; Contract not renewed | April 17 | Kenny Atkinson | Atlanta Hawks assistant coach (2012–2016) | |
| April 14 | Minnesota Timberwolves | Sam Mitchell | Interim; Contract not renewed | April 20 | Tom Thibodeau | Chicago Bulls head coach (2010–2015) | |
| April 14 | Washington Wizards | Randy Wittman | Fired | April 21 | Scott Brooks | Oklahoma City Thunder head coach (2008–2015) | |
| April 14 | Sacramento Kings | George Karl | Fired | May 9 | Dave Joerger | Memphis Grizzlies head coach (2013–2016) | |
| April 24 | Los Angeles Lakers | Byron Scott | Fired | April 29 | Luke Walton | Golden State Warriors assistant coach (2014–2016) | |
| May 5 | Indiana Pacers | Frank Vogel | Fired | May 14 | Nate McMillan | Indiana Pacers assistant coach (2013–2016) | |
| May 5 | Houston Rockets | J. B. Bickerstaff | Interim; Mutual Agreement | May 26 | Mike D'Antoni | Philadelphia 76ers associate head coach (2015–2016) | |
| May 7 | Memphis Grizzlies | Dave Joerger | Fired | May 29 | David Fizdale | Miami Heat assistant coach (2008–2016) | |
| May 12 | Orlando Magic | Scott Skiles | Resigned | May 20 | Frank Vogel | Indiana Pacers head coach (2011–2016) | |
| May 18 | New York Knicks | Kurt Rambis | Interim; Replaced | May 18 | Jeff Hornacek | Phoenix Suns head coach (2013–2016) | |

=== General manager changes ===
Season

| Departure date | Team | Outgoing general manager | Reason for departure | Hire date | Incoming general manager | Last managerial position | Ref. |
|---|---|---|---|---|---|---|---|
| February 20 | Los Angeles Lakers | Mitch Kupchak | Fired | March 7 | Rob Pelinka | none; sports agent | |
| April 13 | Orlando Magic | Rob Hennigan | Fired | April 13 | Matt Lloyd (interim) | Orlando Magic assistant general manager (2012–2017) | |

== Player movements ==
=== Trades ===
June
| June 17 | To Chicago Bulls: Spencer Dinwiddie | To Detroit Pistons: Cameron Bairstow |
| June 22 | To Chicago Bulls: José Calderón; Jerian Grant; Robin Lopez | To New York Knicks: Justin Holiday; Derrick Rose; 2017 Chicago 2nd-round pick |
| June 23 (Draft-day trades) | To Atlanta Hawks: Cash considerations | To Cleveland Cavaliers: Draft rights to Kay Felder (#54) |
| June 23 (Draft-day trades) | To Boston Celtics: 2019 Clippers protected 1st-round pick (Note: The Clippers pick to Boston is protected for #1-14 in 2019 and 2020, else Boston will receive the Clippers' 2022 second-round pick. Boston will not receive a first-round pick until at least two years after the Clippers convey their lottery-protected first-round pick to Toronto, which could happen as late as 2019.) | To Memphis Grizzlies: Draft rights to Deyonta Davis (#31); Draft rights to Rade Zagorac (#35) |
| June 23 (Draft-day trades) | To Brooklyn Nets: Draft rights to Isaiah Whitehead (#42) | To Utah Jazz: Draft rights to Marcus Paige (#55); Cash considerations |
| June 23 (Draft-day trades) | To Denver Nuggets: Cash considerations | To Oklahoma City Thunder: Draft rights to Daniel Hamilton (#56) |
| June 23 (Draft-day trades) | To Golden State Warriors: Draft rights to Patrick McCaw (#38) | To Milwaukee Bucks: Cash considerations |
| June 23 (Draft-day trades) | To Los Angeles Clippers: Draft rights to David Michineau (#39); Draft rights to Diamond Stone (#40) | To New Orleans Pelicans: Draft rights to Cheick Diallo (#33) |
| June 23 (Draft-day trades) | To Oklahoma City Thunder: Ersan İlyasova; Victor Oladipo; Draft rights to Domantas Sabonis (#11) | To Orlando Magic: Serge Ibaka |
| June 23 (Draft-day trades) | To Orlando Magic: 2019 2nd-round pick (Note: Orlando will receive the most favourable of the 2019 second-round picks of Cleveland, Houston, Orlando, and Portland. New York will receive the two least favourable of the Cleveland, Houston, and Orlando picks. Detroit will receive the less favourable of either 1) the Portland pick or 2) the best of the other three picks.); Cash considerations | To Portland Trail Blazers: Draft rights to Jake Layman (#47) |
| June 23 (Draft-day trades) | To Phoenix Suns: Draft rights to Marquese Chriss (#8) | To Sacramento Kings: Draft rights to Skal Labissière (#28); Draft rights to Georgios Papagiannis (#13); Draft rights to Bogdan Bogdanović (2014 #27); 2020 Detroit 2nd-round pick |
| June 29 | To Detroit Pistons: 2019 2nd-round pick | To Orlando Magic: Jodie Meeks |
July
| July 7 | To Brooklyn Nets: Draft rights to Caris LeVert (#20); 2017 Indiana protected 2nd-round pick (Note: The Nets will receive the Pacers' second-round pick if it #31-44; if the pick is not conveyed in 2017 it will roll over each year with the same conditions through 2022, then be conveyed regardless of draft position in 2023.) | To Indiana Pacers: Thaddeus Young |
| July 7 | To Charlotte Hornets: Marco Belinelli | To Sacramento Kings: Draft rights to Malachi Richardson (#22) |
| July 7 | To Chicago Bulls: Draft rights to Ater Majok (2011 #58) | To Los Angeles Lakers: José Calderón; 2018 Denver 2nd-round pick; 2019 Chicago 2nd-round pick |
| July 7 | To Cleveland Cavaliers: Draft rights to Albert Miralles (2004 #39) | To Milwaukee Bucks: Matthew Dellavedova (sign and trade); Cash considerations |
| July 7 | To Chicago Bulls: Draft rights to Albert Miralles (2004 #39) | To Cleveland Cavaliers: Mike Dunleavy Jr.; Draft rights to Vladimir Veremeenko (2006 #48) |
| July 7 | To Dallas Mavericks: Andrew Bogut; 2019 or 2020 Golden State 2nd-round pick (Note: Dallas has the right to defer the conveyance of Golden State's 2019 pick until 2020. Golden State will receive Dallas's pick only if it is #56-60, otherwise they receive no pick.) | To Golden State Warriors: 2019 Dallas conditional 2nd-round pick |
| July 7 | To Dallas Mavericks: Draft rights to Stanko Barać (2007 #39) | To Indiana Pacers: Jeremy Evans; Draft rights to Emir Preldžić (2009 #57); Cash considerations |
| July 7 | To Orlando Magic: Cash considerations | To Portland Trail Blazers: Shabazz Napier |
| July 7 | To San Antonio Spurs (Note: Date of media announcement differs from that on the official NBA Transactions page or RealGM Transactions page. It's common for signings to be announced days, sometimes weeks, after they take place.): Draft rights to Olivier Hanlan (2015 #42) | To Utah Jazz: Boris Diaw; 2022 San Antonio 2nd-round pick (Note: Pick traded from Utah to Cleveland in December 2019.); Cash considerations |
| July 7 | To Utah Jazz: 2021 Washington 2nd-round pick | To Washington Wizards: Trey Burke |
| July 7 | Three-team trade | |
| July 7 | To Atlanta Hawks: Draft rights to Taurean Prince (#12) (from Utah) | To Indiana Pacers: Jeff Teague (from Atlanta) |
| July 7 | To Utah Jazz: George Hill (from Indiana) | |
| July 10 | To Miami Heat: Luke Babbitt | To New Orleans Pelicans: 2018 New Orleans 2nd-round pick; Cash considerations |
| July 12 | To Charlotte Hornets: Cash considerations | To Memphis Grizzlies: Troy Daniels (sign and trade) |
| July 15 | To Cleveland Cavaliers: Draft rights to Chukwudiebere Maduabum (2011 #56) | To Philadelphia 76ers: Sasha Kaun; Cash considerations |
| July 15 | To Los Angeles Clippers: Devyn Marble; 2020 Cleveland 2nd-round pick | To Orlando Magic: C. J. Wilcox; Cash considerations |
August
| August 26 | To Philadelphia 76ers: Tibor Pleiß; Two 2017 2nd-round picks (Note: Philadelphia will receive the most and least favourable of the four 2017 second-round picks originally belonging to Detroit, Golden State, New York, and Utah; Utah will receive the other two.); Cash considerations | To Utah Jazz: Kendall Marshall |
| August 30 | To Denver Nuggets: 2017 Memphis protected 2nd-round pick (Note: Denver will receive the Memphis pick if it's number 36-60, otherwise they will receive Memphis's 2018 second-round pick. The Oklahoma City pick has the same conditions.); 2017 Oklahoma City protected 2nd-round pick | To Oklahoma City Thunder: Joffrey Lauvergne |
September
| September 22 | To Houston Rockets: Tyler Ennis | To Milwaukee Bucks: Michael Beasley |
October
| October 17 | To Chicago Bulls: Michael Carter-Williams | To Milwaukee Bucks: Tony Snell |
November
| November 1 | To Oklahoma City Thunder: Jerami Grant | To Philadelphia 76ers: Ersan İlyasova; 2020 Oklahoma City protected 1st-round pick (Note: Philadelphia will receive Oklahoma City's first-round pick two years after Oklahoma City conveys its lottery-protected first-round pick to Utah (which could happen as early as 2018 or as late as 2020) if it's #21-30. If the Thunder's pick is #1-20 when it becomes available, the Sixers will instead receive the Thunder's 2022 and 2023 second-round picks.) |
January
| January 6 | To Cleveland Cavaliers: 2018 Cleveland protected 1st-round pick (Note: NBA rules prevent teams trading their own future first-round pick in consecutive years; making this trade allowed Cleveland to trade their 2019 first-round pick to Atlanta.) | To Portland Trail Blazers: 2017 Cleveland 1st-round pick |
| January 7 | To Atlanta Hawks: Mike Dunleavy Jr.; Mo Williams; 2019 Cleveland protected 1st-round pick (Note: Atlanta will receive Cleveland's first-round pick in 2019 if it is #11-30, otherwise it will receive Cleveland's first-round pick in 2020 if it is #11-30. If the Hawks do not receive one of these picks, they will receive the Cavaliers' 2021 and 2022 second-round picks.); Cash considerations | To Cleveland Cavaliers: Kyle Korver |
| January 18 | To Atlanta Hawks: Draft rights to Cenk Akyol (2005 #59) | To Denver Nuggets: Mo Williams; Cash considerations |
February
| February 2 | To Charlotte Hornets: Miles Plumlee; Cash considerations | To Milwaukee Bucks: Spencer Hawes; Roy Hibbert |
| February 13 | To Denver Nuggets: Mason Plumlee; 2018 2nd-round pick (Note: Sacramento has the right to swap its pick for Portland's; Denver will receive the lower of the two picks.) | To Portland Trail Blazers: Jusuf Nurkić; 2017 Memphis protected 1st-round pick (Note: Portland will receive Memphis' pick if it's #6-30, otherwise in 2018 if it's #6-30 or unconditionally in 2019.) |
| February 13 | To Charlotte Hornets: Chris Andersen; Cash considerations | To Cleveland Cavaliers: 2017 Charlotte protected 2nd-round pick (Note: Charlotte's pick is protected #31-55; Chicago will receive nothing if the pick falls inside the protected range.) |
| February 14 | To Orlando Magic: Terrence Ross; 2017 1st-round pick (Note: Orlando will receive the less favourable of the Raptor's and Los Angeles Clippers' first-round picks) | To Toronto Raptors: Serge Ibaka |
| February 20 | To New Orleans Pelicans: DeMarcus Cousins; Omri Casspi | To Sacramento Kings: Tyreke Evans; Langston Galloway; Buddy Hield; 2017 New Orleans protected 1st-round pick (Note: Sacramento will receive New Orleans' pick if it is #4-30. If the Kings do not receive the Pelicans' pick in 2017, they will receive New Orleans' first-round pick if it's #2-30 in 2018, 2019, or 2020; if it hasn't been conveyed by 2020, Sacramento will get New Orleans' first-round pick in 2021.); 2017 Philadelphia 2nd-round pick |
| February 22 | To Philadelphia 76ers: Tiago Splitter; 2017 Miami protected 2nd-round pick (Note: Miami pick is protected #31-40 in 2017, unprotected in 2018.); Conditional right to swap 2nd-round picks in 2017 (Note: If Atlanta's pick is #31-55 Philadelphia will have the right to swap it with the least favourable of the four 2nd-round picks originally belonging to Detroit, Golden State, New York and Utah. If the Atlanta pick is #56-60 Philadelphia will receive nothing.) | To Atlanta Hawks: Ersan İlyasova |
| February 22 | To Brooklyn Nets: Andrew Nicholson; Marcus Thornton; 2017 Washington protected 1st-round pick (Note: Brooklyn will receive Washington's pick if it's #15-30. If the pick is not conveyed, Brooklyn will receive Washington's pick in 2018, 2019, 2020 or 2021 if it's #15-30, or in 2022 if it's #11-30. If Washington does not convey its first-round pick, Brooklyn will receive Washington's second-round picks in 2022 and 2023.) | To Washington Wizards: Bojan Bogdanović; Chris McCullough |
| February 23 | To Brooklyn Nets: K. J. McDaniels | To Houston Rockets: Cash considerations |
| February 23 | To Dallas Mavericks: Nerlens Noel | To Philadelphia 76ers: Andrew Bogut; Justin Anderson; 2017 Dallas protected 1st-round pick (Note: Dallas's pick is protected #1-18; if the pick is not conveyed, Philadelphia will receive the Mavericks' 2017 and 2020 second-round picks) |
| February 23 | To Denver Nuggets: Roy Hibbert | To Milwaukee Bucks: 2019 Denver protected 2nd-round pick (Note: If Denver's pick is #31-55 Milwaukee will receive nothing.) |
| February 23 | To Los Angeles Lakers (Note: This trade was widely reported as taking place February 21 but the official announcement, which did not include a date, was not issued until February 23.): Corey Brewer; 2017 Houston 1st-round pick | To Houston Rockets: Lou Williams |
| February 23 | To Los Angeles Lakers: Tyler Ennis; Draft rights to Brad Newley (2007 #54) | To Houston Rockets: Marcelo Huertas |
| February 23 | To Oklahoma City Thunder: Taj Gibson; Doug McDermott; 2018 Chicago 2nd-round pick | To Chicago Bulls: Joffrey Lauvergne; Anthony Morrow; Cameron Payne |
| February 23 | To Phoenix Suns: Mike Scott; Draft rights to Cenk Akyol (2005 #59); Cash considerations | To Atlanta Hawks: 2017 Phoenix protected 2nd-round pick (Note: Atlanta will receive Phoenix's own second round pick if it's #56-60, otherwise they receive nothing.) |
| February 23 | To Phoenix Suns: Jared Sullinger; 2017 Toronto 2nd-round pick; 2018 Toronto 2nd-round pick; Cash considerations | To Toronto Raptors: P. J. Tucker |
May
| May 25 | To Toronto Raptors: Future second-round draft pick (Note: Various unofficial sites report that the pick is the worse of the 2018 picks originally belong to Orlando and the Los Angeles Lakers) | To Orlando Magic: contractual release of general manager Jeff Weltman |

=== Free agency ===
Free agency negotiation started on Friday, July 1, 2016. Players were allowed to sign starting on July 7, after the July Moratorium ended. The following players, who last played for an NBA team during the 2015–16 season, were scheduled to become free agents. All players became unrestricted free agents unless indicated otherwise. A restricted free agent's team has the right to keep the player by matching an offer sheet the player signs with another team. This free agency period was marked with some of the most infamous contracts handed out to players in league history.

| Denotes unsigned players whose free-agent rights were renounced |

| Player | Date signed | New team | Former team | Ref |
|---|---|---|---|---|
| Tony Wroten | June 24 | Memphis Grizzlies (claimed off waivers) | New York Knicks (waived on June 12) | |
| Shawn Long | July 3 | Philadelphia 76ers | Louisiana–Lafayette (undrafted in 2016) | |
| James Webb III | July 3 | Philadelphia 76ers | Boise State (undrafted in 2016) | |
| D. J. Augustin | July 7 | Orlando Magic | Denver Nuggets | |
| Matt Barnes | July 7 | Sacramento Kings | Memphis Grizzlies | |
| Nicolas Batum | July 7 | Charlotte Hornets | | |
| Kent Bazemore | July 7 | Atlanta Hawks | | |
| Bismack Biyombo* | July 7 | Orlando Magic | Toronto Raptors | |
| Jordan Clarkson (RFA) | July 7 | Los Angeles Lakers | | |
| Matthew Dellavedova (RFA) | July 7 | Milwaukee Bucks (via sign and trade) | Cleveland Cavaliers | |
| Luol Deng | July 7 | Los Angeles Lakers | Miami Heat | |
| Kevin Durant | July 7 | Golden State Warriors | Oklahoma City Thunder | |
| Festus Ezeli | July 7 | Portland Trail Blazers | Golden State Warriors | |
| Evan Fournier (RFA) | July 7 | Orlando Magic | | |
| Jeff Green | July 7 | Orlando Magic | Los Angeles Clippers | |
| Roy Hibbert | July 7 | Charlotte Hornets | Los Angeles Lakers | |
| Wesley Johnson | July 7 | Los Angeles Clippers | | |
| Jon Leuer | July 7 | Detroit Pistons | Phoenix Suns | |
| Jeremy Lin* | July 7 | Brooklyn Nets | Charlotte Hornets | |
| Ian Mahinmi | July 7 | Washington Wizards | Indiana Pacers | |
| Luc Mbah a Moute | July 7 | Los Angeles Clippers | | |
| Rodney McGruder | July 7 | Miami Heat | Sioux Falls Skyforce (D-League) | |
| Andrew Nicholson | July 7 | Washington Wizards | Orlando Magic | |
| Daniel Ochefu | July 7 | Washington Wizards | Villanova (undrafted in 2016) | |
| Chandler Parsons* | July 7 | Memphis Grizzlies | Dallas Mavericks | |
| Marshall Plumlee | July 7 | New York Knicks | Duke (undrafted in 2016) | |
| Brian Roberts | July 7 | Charlotte Hornets | Portland Trail Blazers | |
| Rajon Rondo | July 7 | Chicago Bulls | Sacramento Kings | |
| Brandon Rush | July 7 | Minnesota Timberwolves | Golden State Warriors | |
| Ramon Sessions | July 7 | Charlotte Hornets | Washington Wizards | |
| Ish Smith | July 7 | Detroit Pistons | Philadelphia 76ers | |
| Jason Smith | July 7 | Washington Wizards | Orlando Magic | |
| Mirza Teletović | July 7 | Milwaukee Bucks | Phoenix Suns | |
| Evan Turner | July 7 | Portland Trail Blazers | Boston Celtics | |
| Hassan Whiteside | July 7 | Miami Heat | | |
| Arron Afflalo* | July 8 | Sacramento Kings | New York Knicks | |
| Darrell Arthur* | July 8 | Denver Nuggets | | |
| Harrison Barnes (RFA) (Note: NBA Transactions gives July 8 as the date of signing. It may have taken an extra day to process because an offer sheet was involved.) | July 8 | Dallas Mavericks | Golden State Warriors | |
| Trevor Booker | July 8 | Brooklyn Nets | Utah Jazz | |
| Ian Clark | July 8 | Golden State Warriors | | |
| Jamal Crawford | July 8 | Los Angeles Clippers | | |
| Jared Dudley | July 8 | Phoenix Suns | Washington Wizards | |
| Dorian Finney-Smith | July 8 | Dallas Mavericks | Florida (undrafted in 2016) | |
| Al Horford | July 8 | Boston Celtics | Atlanta Hawks | |
| Brandon Jennings | July 8 | New York Knicks | Orlando Magic | |
| Joe Johnson | July 8 | Utah Jazz | Miami Heat | |
| Courtney Lee | July 8 | New York Knicks | Charlotte Hornets | |
| Timofey Mozgov | July 8 | Los Angeles Lakers | Cleveland Cavaliers | |
| Joakim Noah | July 8 | New York Knicks | Chicago Bulls | |
| Dwight Powell (RFA) | July 8 | Dallas Mavericks | | |
| Austin Rivers* | July 8 | Los Angeles Clippers | | |
| Garrett Temple | July 8 | Sacramento Kings | Washington Wizards | |
| Lance Thomas | July 8 | New York Knicks | | |
| Deron Williams* | July 8 | Dallas Mavericks | | |
| Ryan Anderson | July 9 | Houston Rockets | New Orleans Pelicans | |
| Eric Gordon | July 9 | Houston Rockets | New Orleans Pelicans | |
| Gerald Henderson* | July 9 | Philadelphia 76ers | Portland Trail Blazers | |
| Al Jefferson | July 9 | Indiana Pacers | Charlotte Hornets | |
| Mindaugas Kuzminskas (Note: Kuzminskas' signing appears twice on the official NBA Transactions page, on July 9 and again on July 11) | July 9 | New York Knicks | Unicaja (Spain) | |
| Anthony Tolliver | July 9 | Sacramento Kings | Detroit Pistons | |
| David West* | July 9 | Golden State Warriors | San Antonio Spurs | |
| Wayne Ellington* | July 10 | Miami Heat | Brooklyn Nets | |
| Udonis Haslem | July 10 | Miami Heat | | |
| James Johnson* | July 10 | Miami Heat | Toronto Raptors | |
| Meyers Leonard (RFA) | July 10 | Portland Trail Blazers | | |
| Derrick Williams* | July 10 | Miami Heat | New York Knicks | |
| Marvin Williams | July 10 | Charlotte Hornets | | |
| Justin Hamilton | July 11 | Brooklyn Nets | Valencia Basket (Spain) | |
| Cole Aldrich | July 12 | Minnesota Timberwolves | Los Angeles Clippers | |
| Jerryd Bayless | July 12 | Philadelphia 76ers | Milwaukee Bucks | |
| Troy Daniels (RFA) | July 12 | Memphis Grizzlies (via sign and trade) | Charlotte Hornets | |
| Dwight Howard* | July 12 | Atlanta Hawks | Houston Rockets | |
| Stefan Janković | July 12 | Miami Heat | Hawaii (undrafted in 2016) | |
| Boban Marjanović (RFA) | July 12 | Detroit Pistons | San Antonio Spurs | |
| Zaza Pachulia | July 12 | Golden State Warriors | Dallas Mavericks | |
| Sergio Rodríguez | July 12 | Philadelphia 76ers | Real Madrid (Spain) | |
| Marreese Speights | July 12 | Los Angeles Clippers | Golden State Warriors | |
| Allen Crabbe (RFA) | July 13 | Portland Trail Blazers | | |
| James Ennis | July 13 | Memphis Grizzlies | New Orleans Pelicans | |
| Tyler Johnson (RFA) | July 13 | Miami Heat | | |
| James Michael McAdoo | July 13 | Golden State Warriors | | |
| Maurice Ndour | July 13 | New York Knicks | Real Madrid (Spain) | |
| Willie Reed | July 13 | Miami Heat | Brooklyn Nets | |
| Luis Scola | July 13 | Brooklyn Nets | Toronto Raptors | |
| Greivis Vásquez | July 13 | Brooklyn Nets | Milwaukee Bucks | |
| Ryan Arcidiacono | July 14 | San Antonio Spurs | Villanova (undrafted in 2016) | |
| Anthony Bennett | July 14 | Brooklyn Nets | Toronto Raptors (waived on March 1) | |
| Nicolás Brussino | July 14 | Dallas Mavericks | Peñarol (Argentina) | |
| Mike Conley Jr. | July 14 | Memphis Grizzlies | | |
| Dewayne Dedmon | July 14 | San Antonio Spurs | Orlando Magic | |
| Malcolm Delaney | July 14 | Atlanta Hawks | Lokomotiv-Kuban (Russia) | |
| DeMar DeRozan* | July 14 | Toronto Raptors | | |
| Bryn Forbes | July 14 | San Antonio Spurs | Michigan State (undrafted in 2016) | |
| Randy Foye | July 14 | Brooklyn Nets | Oklahoma City Thunder | |
| Pau Gasol* | July 14 | San Antonio Spurs | Chicago Bulls | |
| Manu Ginóbili | July 14 | San Antonio Spurs | | |
| Kris Humphries | July 14 | Atlanta Hawks | | |
| Jarrett Jack | July 14 | Atlanta Hawks | Brooklyn Nets (waived on June 30) | |
| Lamar Patterson | July 14 | Sacramento Kings (claimed off waivers) | Atlanta Hawks (waived on July 12) | |
| Jared Sullinger | July 14 | Toronto Raptors | Boston Celtics | |
| Sasha Vujačić | July 14 | New York Knicks | | |
| Christian Wood | July 14 | Charlotte Hornets | Philadelphia 76ers | |
| Matt Costello | July 15 | Atlanta Hawks | Michigan State (undrafted in 2016) | |
| Seth Curry* | July 15 | Dallas Mavericks | Sacramento Kings | |
| Andre Drummond (RFA) | July 15 | Detroit Pistons | | |
| Jonathan Gibson | July 15 | Dallas Mavericks | Qingdao DoubleStar (China) | |
| Dwyane Wade | July 15 | Chicago Bulls | Miami Heat | |
| Okaro White | July 15 | Miami Heat | Aris Thessaloniki (Greece) | |
| Fred VanVleet | July 16 | Toronto Raptors | Wichita State (undrafted in 2016) | |
| Anderson Varejão | July 16 | Golden State Warriors | | |
| Leandro Barbosa | July 19 | Phoenix Suns | Golden State Warriors | |
| Brandon Bass* | July 19 | Los Angeles Clippers | Los Angeles Lakers | |
| Joe Harris | July 19 | Brooklyn Nets | Cleveland Cavaliers | |
| Jordan Hill | July 19 | Minnesota Timberwolves | Indiana Pacers | |
| Nenê | July 19 | Houston Rockets | Washington Wizards | |
| Quincy Acy | July 20 | Dallas Mavericks | Sacramento Kings | |
| Isaiah Canaan | July 20 | Chicago Bulls | Philadelphia 76ers | |
| Kyle Collinsworth | July 20 | Dallas Mavericks | BYU (undrafted in 2016) | |
| Mike Miller | July 20 | Denver Nuggets | | |
| Chris Andersen | July 21 | Cleveland Cavaliers | Memphis Grizzlies | |
| Aaron Brooks | July 21 | Indiana Pacers | Chicago Bulls | |
| Langston Galloway | July 21 | New Orleans Pelicans | New York Knicks | |
| Solomon Hill | July 21 | New Orleans Pelicans | Indiana Pacers | |
| E'Twaun Moore | July 21 | New Orleans Pelicans | Chicago Bulls | |
| D. J. Stephens | July 21 | Memphis Grizzlies | Iowa Energy (D-League) | |
| Yogi Ferrell | July 22 | Brooklyn Nets | Indiana (undrafted in 2016) | |
| Tim Frazier* (RFA) | July 22 | New Orleans Pelicans | | |
| Alonzo Gee* | July 22 | New Orleans Pelicans | | |
| Terrence Jones | July 22 | New Orleans Pelicans | Houston Rockets | |
| Brandon Paul (Note: Brandon Paul's signing appears twice on the official NBA Transactions page, on July 22 and again on July 27.) | July 22 | Philadelphia 76ers | Divina Seguros Joventut (Spain) | |
| Marcus Thornton | July 22 | Washington Wizards | | |
| Sheldon McClellan | July 24 | Washington Wizards | Miami (FL) (undrafted in 2016) | |
| Dirk Nowitzki | July 24 | Dallas Mavericks | | |
| Beau Beech | July 25 | Brooklyn Nets | North Florida (undrafted in 2016) | |
| Raymond Felton | July 25 | Los Angeles Clippers | Dallas Mavericks | |
| Ray McCallum Jr. (Note: Signing not listed on official NBA Transactions page.) | July 25 | Detroit Pistons | Memphis Grizzlies (10-day contract) | |
| Tim Quarterman | July 25 | Portland Trail Blazers | LSU (undrafted in 2016) | |
| Mike Tobey | July 25 | Charlotte Hornets | Virginia (undrafted in 2016) | |
| Dion Waiters | July 25 | Miami Heat | Oklahoma City Thunder | |
| Bradley Beal (RFA) | July 26 | Washington Wizards | | |
| Treveon Graham | July 26 | Charlotte Hornets | Idaho Stampede (D-League) | |
| Danuel House | July 26 | Washington Wizards | Texas A&M (undrafted in 2016) | |
| Wayne Selden Jr. | July 26 | Memphis Grizzlies | Kansas (undrafted in 2016) | |
| Amar'e Stoudemire | July 26 | New York Knicks | Miami Heat | |
| Jarrod Uthoff | July 26 | Toronto Raptors | Iowa (undrafted in 2016) | |
| Troy Williams | July 26 | Memphis Grizzlies | Indiana (undrafted in 2016) | |
| Gerald Green | July 27 | Boston Celtics | Miami Heat | |
| Maurice Harkless (RFA) | July 27 | Portland Trail Blazers | | |
| Keith Hornsby | July 27 | Dallas Mavericks | LSU (undrafted in 2016) | |
| Egidijus Mockevičius | July 27 | Brooklyn Nets | Evansville (undrafted in 2016) | |
| Jameel Warney | July 27 | Dallas Mavericks | Stony Brook (undrafted in 2016) | |
| Tyler Zeller (RFA) | July 27 | Boston Celtics | | |
| Spencer Dinwiddie | July 28 | Chicago Bulls (waived on July 7) | | |
| Richard Jefferson | July 28 | Cleveland Cavaliers | | |
| Pablo Prigioni | July 28 | Houston Rockets | Los Angeles Clippers | |
| Ron Baker | July 29 | New York Knicks | Wichita State (undrafted in 2016) | |
| Patricio Garino | July 29 | San Antonio Spurs | George Washington (undrafted in 2016) | |
| J. P. Tokoto | August 1 | New York Knicks | Oklahoma City Blue (D-League) | |
| Alan Anderson | August 2 | Los Angeles Clippers | Washington Wizards | |
| Drew Crawford | August 2 | Toronto Raptors | Bnei Herzliya (Israel) | |
| James Jones | August 2 | Cleveland Cavaliers | | |
| David Lee | August 2 | San Antonio Spurs | Dallas Mavericks | |
| DeAndre Liggins | August 2 | Cleveland Cavaliers | Sioux Falls Skyforce (D-League) | |
| Miles Plumlee (RFA) | August 2 | Milwaukee Bucks | | |
| Chasson Randle | August 3 | New York Knicks | ČEZ Nymburk (Czech Republic) | |
| Marcelo Huertas | August 5 | Los Angeles Lakers | | |
| Tony Wroten | August 5 | Memphis Grizzlies (waived on July 11) | | |
| Shawn Dawson | August 10 | New Orleans Pelicans | Maccabi Rishon LeZion (Israel) | |
| Yanick Moreira | August 10 | Toronto Raptors | UCAM Murcia (Spain) (Note: Moreira was under contract to Petro de Luanda, which loaned him to Murcia after the team was ruled to have exceeded the allowable number of signings in a season.) | |
| Elliot Williams | August 10 | Golden State Warriors | Panathinaikos (Greece) | |
| LeBron James* | August 12 | Cleveland Cavaliers | | |
| Chris Copeland | August 13 | New Orleans Pelicans | Milwaukee Bucks (waived on February 25) | |
| Ronnie Price | August 13 | Oklahoma City Thunder | Phoenix Suns | |
| Robert Sacre | August 13 | New Orleans Pelicans | Los Angeles Lakers | |
| Grant Jerrett | August 15 | Portland Trail Blazers | Utah Jazz (waived on October 15) | |
| D. J. Kennedy | August 16 | Denver Nuggets | Yenisey Krasnoyarsk (Russia) | |
| Yi Jianlian | August 16 | Los Angeles Lakers | Guangdong Southern Tigers (China) | |
| Marcus Georges-Hunt | August 17 | Boston Celtics | Georgia Tech (undrafted in 2016) | |
| Beno Udrih | August 17 | Miami Heat (waived on February 29) | | |
| Toure' Murry | August 22 | Minnesota Timberwolves | Sioux Falls Skyforce (D-League) | |
| Jason Terry | August 22 | Milwaukee Bucks | Houston Rockets | |
| Tarik Black (RFA) | August 23 | Los Angeles Lakers | | |
| John Lucas III | August 24 | Minnesota Timberwolves | Piratas de Quebradillas (Puerto Rico) | |
| Julyan Stone | August 26 | Indiana Pacers | Royal Halı Gaziantep (Turkey) | |
| Zach Auguste | August 29 | Los Angeles Lakers | Notre Dame (undrafted in 2016) | |
| Steve Novak | August 29 | Milwaukee Bucks | | |
| Alex Poythress | August 29 | Indiana Pacers | Kentucky (undrafted in 2016) | |
| Ty Lawson | August 30 | Sacramento Kings | Indiana Pacers | |
| Anthony Barber | August 31 | Philadelphia 76ers | NC State (undrafted in 2016) | |
| Julian Jacobs | September 1 | Los Angeles Lakers | USC (undrafted in 2016) | |
| Travis Wear | September 1 | Los Angeles Lakers | RETAbet.es GBC (Spain) | |
| Quincy Ford | September 6 | Utah Jazz | Northeastern (undrafted in 2016) | |
| Orlando Johnson | September 6 | Milwaukee Bucks | Guangxi Rhino (China) | |
| J. J. O'Brien | September 6 | Milwaukee Bucks | Idaho Stampede (D-League) | |
| Nick Zeisloft | September 6 | Indiana Pacers | Indiana (undrafted in 2016) | |
| Andrew Andrews | September 7 | Charlotte Hornets | Washington (undrafted in 2016) | |
| Elton Brand | September 7 | Philadelphia 76ers | | |
| Robbie Hummel | September 7 | Denver Nuggets | EA7 Emporio Armani Milano (Italy) | |
| E. J. Singler | September 7 | Toronto Raptors | Raptors 905 (D-League) | |
| Jarnell Stokes | September 7 | Denver Nuggets | Sioux Falls Skyforce (D-League) | |
| Rasheed Sulaimon | September 7 | Charlotte Hornets | Maryland (undrafted in 2016) | |
| Cliff Alexander | September 8 | Orlando Magic | Portland Trail Blazers (waived on July 7) | |
| Branden Dawson | September 8 | Orlando Magic | Los Angeles Clippers (waived on July 17) | |
| Nick Johnson | September 8 | Orlando Magic | Austin Spurs (D-League) | |
| Kevin Murphy | September 8 | Orlando Magic | Hitachi SunRockers (Japan) | |
| Arinze Onuaku | September 8 | Orlando Magic | Meralco Bolts (Philippines) | |
| Damjan Rudež | September 8 | Orlando Magic | Minnesota Timberwolves | |
| Kevin Séraphin | September 8 | Indiana Pacers | New York Knicks | |
| Xavier Henry | September 9 | Milwaukee Bucks | Santa Cruz Warriors (D-League) | |
| Ryan Richards | September 9 | San Antonio Spurs | Al-Ahli (Bahrain) | |
| Elgin Cook | September 12 | Golden State Warriors | Oregon (undrafted in 2016) | |
| Cameron Jones | September 12 | Golden State Warriors | Arkadikos (Greece) (Note: Arkadikos was relegated to the Greek A2 Basketball League following the 2015–16 season.) | |
| Jalen Jones | September 12 | Boston Celtics | Texas A&M (undrafted in 2016) | |
| Damion Lee | September 12 | Boston Celtics | Louisville (undrafted in 2016) | |
| JaVale McGee | September 12 | Golden State Warriors | Dallas Mavericks (waived on July 8) | |
| Phil Pressey | September 12 | Golden State Warriors | Idaho Stampede (D-League) | |
| Greg Stiemsma | September 12 | Portland Trail Blazers | Orlando Magic (waived on October 22) | |
| Nate Wolters | September 12 | Denver Nuggets | Beşiktaş Sompo Japan (Turkey) | |
| Jordan Farmar | September 13 | Sacramento Kings | Memphis Grizzlies | |
| Shaquille Harrison | September 13 | Phoenix Suns | Tulsa (undrafted in 2016) | |
| Derrick Jones Jr. | September 13 | Phoenix Suns | UNLV (undrafted in 2016) | |
| Lance Stephenson | September 13 | New Orleans Pelicans | Memphis Grizzlies | |
| Trey Freeman | September 14 | Detroit Pistons | Old Dominion (undrafted in 2016) | |
| Nikola Jovanović | September 14 | Detroit Pistons | USC (undrafted in 2016) | |
| D'Vauntes Smith-Rivera | September 14 | Chicago Bulls | Georgetown (undrafted in 2016) | |
| Vince Hunter | September 16 | Chicago Bulls | Panathinaikos (Greece) | |
| Lou Amundson | September 19 | New York Knicks | | |
| J. J. Avila | September 19 | Chicago Bulls | Stella Artois Leuven Bears (Belgium) | |
| C. J. Williams | September 19 | Dallas Mavericks | JDA Dijon Bourgogne (France) | |
| Will Bynum | September 20 | Atlanta Hawks | Guangdong Southern Tigers (China) | |
| Brady Heslip | September 20 | Toronto Raptors | Acqua Vitasnella Cantù (Italy) | |
| Ryan Kelly | September 20 | Atlanta Hawks | Los Angeles Lakers | |
| Xavier Munford | September 20 | Los Angeles Clippers | Memphis Grizzlies | |
| Johnny O'Bryant III | September 20 | Washington Wizards | Milwaukee Bucks (waived on June 29) | |
| Richard Solomon | September 20 | Atlanta Hawks | Toyota Alvark Tokyo (Japan) | |
| Casper Ware | September 20 | Washington Wizards | ASVEL Basket (France) | |
| Thomas Robinson* | September 21 | Los Angeles Lakers | Brooklyn Nets | |
| Henry Sims | September 21 | Utah Jazz | Brooklyn Nets | |
| Alex Caruso | September 22 | Oklahoma City Thunder | Texas A&M (undrafted in 2016) | |
| Kaleb Tarczewski | September 22 | Oklahoma City Thunder | Arizona (undrafted in 2016) | |
| Scott Wood | September 22 | Golden State Warriors | UCAM Murcia (Spain) | |
| Chris Wright | September 22 | Oklahoma City Thunder | Maccabi Rishon LeZion (Israel) | |
| Keith Benson | September 23 | Miami Heat | Sioux Falls Skyforce (D-League) | |
| Bobby Brown | September 23 | Houston Rockets | Beşiktaş Sompo Japan (Turkey) | |
| Jabari Brown | September 23 | Milwaukee Bucks | Los Angeles D-Fenders (D-League) | |
| Chris Crawford | September 23 | Memphis Grizzlies | Canton Charge (D-League) | |
| Eric Dawson | September 23 | Utah Jazz | Blackwater Elite (Philippines) | |
| Perry Ellis | September 23 | Charlotte Hornets | Kansas (undrafted in 2016) | |
| Gary Payton II | September 23 | Houston Rockets | Oregon State (undrafted in 2016) | |
| Jaleel Roberts | September 23 | Milwaukee Bucks | Brisbane Spartans (Australia) | |
| Isaiah Taylor | September 23 | Houston Rockets | Texas (undrafted in 2016) | |
| Kyle Wiltjer | September 23 | Houston Rockets | Gonzaga (undrafted in 2016) | |
| Metta World Peace | September 23 | Los Angeles Lakers | | |
| Quinn Cook | September 24 | New Orleans Pelicans | Canton Charge (D-League) | |
| Gracin Bakumanya | September 25 | Phoenix Suns | Antibes Sharks (France) | |
| Derek Cooke | September 25 | Phoenix Suns | Bakersfield Jam (D-League) | |
| Joel Anthony | September 26 | San Antonio Spurs | Detroit Pistons (waived on July 7) | |
| Lorenzo Brown | September 26 | Detroit Pistons | | |
| Markel Brown | September 26 | Cleveland Cavaliers | Brooklyn Nets | |
| Chase Budinger | September 26 | Brooklyn Nets | Phoenix Suns | |
| Rasual Butler | September 26 | Minnesota Timberwolves | San Antonio Spurs | |
| Jorge Gutiérrez | September 26 | Brooklyn Nets | Charlotte Hornets | |
| John Holland | September 26 | Cleveland Cavaliers | Boston Celtics (waived on August 31) | |
| Jonathan Holmes | September 26 | Cleveland Cavaliers | Los Angeles Lakers (waived on October 23) | |
| Cory Jefferson | September 26 | Cleveland Cavaliers | Bakersfield Jam (D-League) | |
| Dahntay Jones | September 26 | Cleveland Cavaliers (waived on July 30) | | |
| Nicolás Laprovíttola | September 26 | San Antonio Spurs | Movistar Estudiantes (Spain) | |
| Eric Moreland | September 26 | Cleveland Cavaliers | Sacramento Kings | |
| Thomas Walkup | September 26 | Chicago Bulls | Stephen F. Austin (undrafted in 2016) | |
| Dorell Wright | September 26 | Los Angeles Clippers | Miami Heat | |
| P. J. Hairston | September 30 | Houston Rockets | Memphis Grizzlies | |
| Toney Douglas | October 3 | Cleveland Cavaliers | New Orleans Pelicans (waived on July 12) | |
| Josh Magette | October 3 | Atlanta Hawks | Los Angeles D-Fenders (D-League) | |
| Vince Hunter | October 9 | Memphis Grizzlies | Chicago Bulls (waived on October 4) | |
| Damien Inglis | October 11 | New York Knicks | Milwaukee Bucks (waived on June 29) | |
| J. R. Smith | October 15 | Cleveland Cavaliers | | |
| Jaleel Cousins | October 17 | Dallas Mavericks | South Florida (undrafted in 2016) | |
| Vashil Fernandez | October 17 | Miami Heat | Valparaiso (undrafted in 2016) | |
| Quincy Ford | October 17 | New Orleans Pelicans | Utah Jazz (waived on October 13) | |
| Reggie Williams | October 17 | Oklahoma City Thunder | Avtodor Saratov (Russia) | |
| Cleanthony Early | October 18 | New York Knicks | | |
| Luis Montero | October 18 | Miami Heat | Portland Trail Blazers (waived on October 15) | |
| Matt Costello | October 20 | Memphis Grizzlies | Atlanta Hawks (waived on October 17) | |
| Kellen Dunham | October 20 | Memphis Grizzlies | Butler (undrafted in 2016) | |
| Ramon Galloway | October 21 | Orlando Magic | Paffoni Omegna (Italy) | |
| Ryan Kelly | October 21 | Boston Celtics | Atlanta Hawks (waived on October 19) | |
| Chris Obekpa | October 21 | Golden State Warriors | St. John's (undrafted in 2016) | |
| JaKarr Sampson | October 21 | Memphis Grizzlies | Denver Nuggets (waived on October 15) | |
| Mamadou N'Diaye | October 22 | Detroit Pistons | UC Irvine (undrafted in 2016) | |
| Le'Bryan Nash | October 22 | Houston Rockets | Fukushima Firebonds (Japan) | |
| Ben Bentil | October 24 | Indiana Pacers | Boston Celtics (waived on October 21) | |
| Dionte Christmas | October 24 | Philadelphia 76ers | Torku Konyaspor (Turkey) | |
| Beno Udrih | October 24 | Detroit Pistons | Miami Heat (waived on October 22) | |
| R. J. Hunter | October 27 | Chicago Bulls | Boston Celtics (waived on October 24) | |
| Ryan Kelly | October 31 | Atlanta Hawks | Boston Celtics (waived on October 22) | |
| Jordan Farmar | November 2 | Sacramento Kings (waived on October 24) | | |
| Archie Goodwin | November 7 | New Orleans Pelicans | Phoenix Suns (waived on October 24) | |
| Yogi Ferrell | November 9 | Brooklyn Nets | Long Island Nets (D-League) | |
| Alonzo Gee | November 16 | Denver Nuggets | New Orleans Pelicans (waived on October 24) | |
| Jonathan Gibson | November 18 | Dallas Mavericks (waived on October 22) | | |
| Anthony Brown | November 21 | New Orleans Pelicans | Erie BayHawks (D-League) | |
| Toney Douglas | December 5 | Memphis Grizzlies | Cleveland Cavaliers (waived on October 15) | |
| Spencer Dinwiddie | December 8 | Brooklyn Nets | Windy City Bulls (D-League) | |
| Reggie Williams | December 10 | New Orleans Pelicans | Oklahoma City Blue (D-League) | |
| Bobby Brown | December 16 | Houston Rockets (waived on December 5) | | |
| Pierre Jackson | December 27 | Dallas Mavericks | Texas Legends (D-League) | |
| Donatas Motiejūnas | January 3 | New Orleans Pelicans | Houston Rockets | |
| Alonzo Gee | January 8 | Denver Nuggets (10-day contract / waived on January 6) | | |
| Quincy Acy | January 10 | Brooklyn Nets (10-day contract) | Texas Legends (D-League) | |
| Chasson Randle | January 10 | Philadelphia 76ers (10-day contract) | Westchester Knicks (D-League) | |
| Pierre Jackson | January 15 | Dallas Mavericks (10-day contract) | Texas Legends (D-League) | |
| Okaro White | January 17 | Miami Heat (10-day contract) | Sioux Falls Skyforce (D-League) | |
| Gary Neal | January 18 | Atlanta Hawks (10-day contract) | Texas Legends (D-League) | |
| Quincy Acy | January 20 | Brooklyn Nets (second 10-day contract) | | |
| Chasson Randle | January 20 | Philadelphia 76ers (second 10-day contract) | | |
| Mo Williams | January 20 | Philadelphia 76ers (claimed off waivers) | Denver Nuggets (waived on January 18) | |
| Anthony Brown | January 22 | Orlando Magic (10-day contract) | Erie BayHawks (D-League) | |
| Joel Anthony | January 23 | San Antonio Spurs (10-day contract / waived on October 22) | | |
| Mo Williams | January 23 | Denver Nuggets (claimed off waivers) | Philadelphia 76ers (waived on January 21) | |
| Pierre Jackson | January 25 | Dallas Mavericks (second 10-day contract) | | |
| Johnny O'Bryant III | January 26 | Denver Nuggets (10-day contract) | Northern Arizona Suns (D-League) | |
| Ronnie Price | January 27 | Phoenix Suns (10-day contract) | Oklahoma City Thunder (waived on October 24) | |
| Okaro White | January 27 | Miami Heat (second 10-day contract) | | |
| Yogi Ferrell | January 28 | Dallas Mavericks (10-day contract) | Long Island Nets (D-League) | |
| Lamar Patterson | January 29 | Atlanta Hawks (10-day contract) | Reno Bighorns (D-League) | |
| Quincy Acy | January 30 | Brooklyn Nets (signed for rest of season) | | |
| Toney Douglas | January 30 | Memphis Grizzlies (10-day contract/ waived on December 15) | | |
| Chasson Randle | January 30 | Philadelphia 76ers (signed for rest of season) | | |
| Joel Anthony | February 2 | San Antonio Spurs (second 10-day contract) | | |
| Ray McCallum Jr. | February 3 | Charlotte Hornets (10-day contract) | Grand Rapids Drive (D-League) | |
| Mike Tobey | February 3 | Charlotte Hornets (10-day contract) | Greensboro Swarm (D-League) | |
| Brianté Weber | February 4 | Golden State Warriors (10-day contract) | Sioux Falls Skyforce (D-League) | |
| Johnny O'Bryant III | February 6 | Denver Nuggets (second 10-day contract) | | |
| Ronnie Price | February 6 | Phoenix Suns (second 10-day contract) | | |
| Okaro White | February 6 | Miami Heat (signed for rest of season) | | |
| Yogi Ferrell | February 7 | Dallas Mavericks (signed for rest of season) | | |
| Lamar Patterson | February 8 | Atlanta Hawks (second 10-day contract) | | |
| Marcus Georges-Hunt | February 8 | Miami Heat (10-day contract) | Maine Red Claws (D-League) | |
| Lance Stephenson | February 8 | Minnesota Timberwolves (10-day contract) | New Orleans Pelicans (waived on November 7) | |
| Toney Douglas | February 9 | Memphis Grizzlies (second 10-day contract) | | |
| Derrick Williams | February 9 | Cleveland Cavaliers (10-day contract) | Miami Heat (waived on February 6) | |
| Joel Anthony | February 12 | San Antonio Spurs (signed for rest of season) | | |
| Ray McCallum Jr. | February 13 | Charlotte Hornets (second 10-day contract) | | |
| Mike Tobey | February 13 | Charlotte Hornets (second 10-day contract) | | |
| Brianté Weber | February 14 | Golden State Warriors (second 10-day contract) | | |
| Derrick Williams | February 22 | Cleveland Cavaliers (second 10-day contract) | | |
| Toney Douglas | February 23 | Memphis Grizzlies (signed for rest of season) | | |
| Hollis Thompson | February 23 | New Orleans Pelicans (10-day contract) | Austin Spurs (D-League) | |
| Jarrett Jack | February 24 | New Orleans Pelicans (10-day contract) | Atlanta Hawks (waived on October 20) | |
| Ryan Kelly | February 24 | Atlanta Hawks (signed for rest of season) | Maine Red Claws (D-League) | |
| Johnny O'Bryant III | February 24 | Charlotte Hornets (10-day contract) | Northern Arizona Suns (D-League) | |
| Lamar Patterson | February 24 | Atlanta Hawks (signed for rest of season) | Reno Bighorns (D-League) | |
| Ronnie Price | February 24 | Phoenix Suns (signed for rest of season) | | |
| Axel Toupane | February 25 | Milwaukee Bucks (10-day contract) | Raptors 905 (D-League) | |
| Reggie Williams | February 25 | New Orleans Pelicans (10-day contract) | Oklahoma City Blue (D-League) | |
| Ben Bentil | February 26 | Dallas Mavericks (10-day contract) | Fort Wayne Mad Ants (D-League) | |
| Quinn Cook | February 26 | Dallas Mavericks (10-day contract) | Canton Charge (D-League) | |
| Chasson Randle | February 27 | New York Knicks (signed for rest of season) | Philadelphia 76ers (waived on February 24) | |
| Isaiah Taylor | February 27 | Houston Rockets | Rio Grande Valley Vipers (D-League) | |
| Brianté Weber | February 27 | Charlotte Hornets (10-day contract) | Golden State Warriors (After second 10-day contract expired) | |
| Deron Williams | February 27 | Cleveland Cavaliers | Dallas Mavericks (waived on February 23) | |
| David Nwaba | February 28 | Los Angeles Lakers (10-day contract) | Los Angeles D-Fenders (D-League) | |
| José Calderón | March 1 | Golden State Warriors (signed for rest of season) | Los Angeles Lakers (waived on February 27) | |
| Norris Cole | March 1 | Oklahoma City Thunder (signed for rest of season) | Shandong Golden Stars (China) | |
| Brandon Jennings | March 1 | Washington Wizards (signed for rest of season) | New York Knicks (waived on February 27) | |
| Matt Barnes | March 2 | Golden State Warriors (signed for rest of season) | Sacramento Kings (waived on February 20) | |
| Andrew Bogut | March 2 | Cleveland Cavaliers (signed for rest of season) | Philadelphia 76ers (waived on February 27) | |
| Justin Harper | March 3 | Philadelphia 76ers (10-day contract) | Los Angeles D-Fenders (D-League) | |
| José Calderón | March 4 | Atlanta Hawks (claimed off waivers) | Golden State Warriors (waived on March 1) | |
| Terrence Jones | March 4 | Milwaukee Bucks (signed for rest of season) | New Orleans Pelicans (waived on February 23) | |
| Derrick Williams | March 4 | Cleveland Cavaliers (signed for rest of season) | | |
| Hollis Thompson | March 5 | New Orleans Pelicans (second 10-day contract) | | |
| Jordan Crawford | March 6 | New Orleans Pelicans (10-day contract) | Grand Rapids Drive (D-League) | |
| Shawn Long | March 6 | Philadelphia 76ers (10-day contract) | Delaware 87ers (D-League) | |
| Johnny O'Bryant III | March 6 | Charlotte Hornets (second 10-day contract) | | |
| Wayne Selden Jr. | March 8 | New Orleans Pelicans (10-day contract) | Iowa Energy (D-League) | |
| Lance Stephenson | March 8 | Minnesota Timberwolves (second 10-day contract / Previous 10-day contract ended February 18, 2017) | | |
| Manny Harris | March 9 | Dallas Mavericks (10-day contract) | Texas Legends (D-League) | |
| Jarrod Uthoff | March 9 | Dallas Mavericks (10-day contract) | Fort Wayne Mad Ants (D-League) | |
| Brianté Weber | March 9 | Charlotte Hornets (second 10-day contract) | | |
| Troy Williams | March 10 | Houston Rockets (10-day contract) | Rio Grande Valley Vipers (D-League) | |
| David Nwaba | March 11 | Los Angeles Lakers (second 10-day contract) | | |
| Larry Sanders | March 13 | Cleveland Cavaliers (signed for rest of season) | Milwaukee Bucks (Waived on February 21, 2015) | |
| Archie Goodwin | March 15 | Brooklyn Nets (10-day contract) | Greensboro Swarm (D-League) | |
| Jordan Crawford | March 16 | New Orleans Pelicans (signed for rest of season) | | |
| Shawn Long | March 16 | Philadelphia 76ers (signed for multi-year contract) | | |
| Johnny O'Bryant III | March 16 | Charlotte Hornets (signed for multi-year contract) | | |
| Wayne Selden Jr. | March 18 | Memphis Grizzlies (signed for multi-year contract) | New Orleans Pelicans (End of first 10-day contract) | |
| Quinn Cook | March 19 | New Orleans Pelicans (10-day contract) | Dallas Mavericks (End of first 10-day contract) | |
| Jarell Eddie | March 19 | Phoenix Suns (10-day contract) | Windy City Bulls (D-League) | |
| Manny Harris | March 19 | Dallas Mavericks (second 10-day contract) | | |
| Jarrod Uthoff | March 19 | Dallas Mavericks (second 10-day contract) | | |
| Brianté Weber | March 19 | Charlotte Hornets (signed for multi-year contract) | | |
| Troy Williams | March 20 | Houston Rockets (signed for rest of season) | | |
| Omri Casspi | March 20 | Minnesota Timberwolves (signed for rest of season) | New Orleans Pelicans (Waived on February 25) | |
| David Nwaba | March 21 | Los Angeles Lakers (signed for multi-year contract) | | |
| Archie Goodwin | March 25 | Brooklyn Nets (second 10-day contract) | | |
| Quinn Cook | March 29 | New Orleans Pelicans (second 10-day contract) | | |
| Jarell Eddie | March 29 | Phoenix Suns (second 10-day contract) | | |
| Jarrod Uthoff | March 29 | Dallas Mavericks (signed for multi-year contract) | | |
| Lance Stephenson | March 30 | Indiana Pacers (signed for multi-year contract) | Minnesota Timberwolves (Second 10-day contract ended March 18, 2017) | |
| Cliff Alexander | April 2 | Brooklyn Nets (10-day contract) | Long Island Nets (D-League) | |
| Alex Poythress | April 2 | Philadelphia 76ers (10-day contract) | Fort Wayne Mad Ants (D-League) | |
| Gary Payton II | April 2 | Milwaukee Bucks (signed for multi-year contract) | Rio Grande Valley Vipers (D-League) | |
| Patricio Garino | April 3 | Orlando Magic (signed for multi-year contract) | Austin Spurs (D-League) | |
| Marcus Georges-Hunt | April 3 | Orlando Magic (signed for multi-year contract) | Maine Red Claws (D-League) | |
| Prince Ibeh | April 3 | Brooklyn Nets (10-day contract) | Long Island Nets (D-League) | |
| Archie Goodwin | April 4 | Brooklyn Nets (signed for multi-year contract) | | |
| Quinn Cook | April 8 | New Orleans Pelicans (signed for rest of season) | | |
| Elijah Millsap | April 9 | Phoenix Suns (signed for multi-year contract) | Northern Arizona Suns (D-League) | |
| Axel Toupane | April 10 | New Orleans Pelicans (signed for rest of season) | Raptors 905 (D-League) | |
| DeAndre Liggins | April 11 | Dallas Mavericks (claimed off waivers) | Cleveland Cavaliers (waived on April 9) | |
| Alex Poythress | April 11 | Philadelphia 76ers (signed for rest of season) | | |
| Dahntay Jones | April 12 | Cleveland Cavaliers (signed for rest of season | previously waived on October 24, 2016) | | |
| Walter Tavares | April 12 | Cleveland Cavaliers (signed for rest of season) | Raptors 905 (D-League) | |
| Kirk Hinrich | | | Atlanta Hawks | |
| Chris Kaman | | | Portland Trail Blazers | |
| Andre Miller | | | San Antonio Spurs | |
| Nazr Mohammed | | | Oklahoma City Thunder | |
| Kendrick Perkins | | | New Orleans Pelicans | |
| Tayshaun Prince | | | Minnesota Timberwolves | |
| Charlie Villanueva | | | Dallas Mavericks | |
| Jordan Adams | | | Memphis Grizzlies (waived on October 24) | |
| Chris Andersen | | | Charlotte Hornets (waived on February 13) | |
| Caron Butler | | | Sacramento Kings (waived on July 4) | |
| Rasual Butler | | | Minnesota Timberwolves (waived on October 22) | |
| Mario Chalmers | | | Memphis Grizzlies (waived on March 10) | |
| Jordan Farmar | | | Sacramento Kings (waived on November 7) | |
| Drew Gooden | | | Washington Wizards (waived on July 7) | |
| Danuel House | | | Washington Wizards (waived on March 2) | |
| Marcelo Huertas | | | Houston Rockets (waived on February 25) | |
| John Lucas III | | | Minnesota Timberwolves (waived on January 7) | |
| Jordan McRae | | | Cleveland Cavaliers (waived on March 1) | |
| Mitch McGary | | | Oklahoma City Thunder (waived on October 24) | |
| Steve Novak | | | Milwaukee Bucks (waived on February 2) | |
| Luis Scola | | | Brooklyn Nets (waived on February 27) | |
| Mike Scott | | | Phoenix Suns (waived on February 24) | |
| Greg Stiemsma | | | Portland Trail Blazers (waived on October 21) | |
| Jared Sullinger | | | Phoenix Suns (waived on February 24) | |
| Marcus Thornton | | | Brooklyn Nets (waived on February 23) | |
| Anderson Varejão | | | Golden State Warriors (waived on February 3) | |
| Greivis Vásquez | | | Brooklyn Nets (waived on November 9) | |
| Elliot Williams | | | Golden State Warriors (waived on October 20) | |
| Mo Williams | | | Denver Nuggets (waived on January 24) | |
| Dorell Wright | | | Los Angeles Clippers (waived on October 12) | |

* Player option
** Team option
*** Early termination option

=== Going to other North American leagues ===
| * | Denotes D-League players who returned to their former team |

| Player | Date signed | New team | New league | NBA team | NBA contract status | Ref |
|---|---|---|---|---|---|---|
| Cliff Alexander | October 29 | Erie BayHawks | D-League | Orlando Magic | Unrestricted free agent | |
| Ryan Arcidiacono | October 29 | Austin Spurs | D-League | San Antonio Spurs | Unrestricted free agent | |
| Anthony Barber | October 29 | Delaware 87ers | D-League | Philadelphia 76ers | Unrestricted free agent | |
| Matt Costello | October 29 | Iowa Energy | D-League | Memphis Grizzlies | Unrestricted free agent | |
| Dionte Christmas | October 29 | Delaware 87ers | D-League | Philadelphia 76ers | Unrestricted free agent | |
| Branden Dawson* | October 29 | Erie BayHawks | D-League | Orlando Magic | Unrestricted free agent | |
| Kellen Dunham | October 29 | Iowa Energy | D-League | Memphis Grizzlies | Unrestricted free agent | |
| Jarell Eddie* | October 29 | Austin Spurs | D-League | Washington Wizards | Unrestricted free agent | |
| Ramon Galloway | October 29 | Erie BayHawks | D-League | Orlando Magic | Unrestricted free agent | |
| Patricio Garino | October 29 | Austin Spurs | D-League | San Antonio Spurs | Unrestricted free agent | |
| Livio Jean-Charles | October 29 | Austin Spurs | D-League | San Antonio Spurs | Unrestricted free agent | |
| Shawn Long | October 29 | Delaware 87ers | D-League | Philadelphia 76ers | Unrestricted free agent | |
| JaKarr Sampson | October 29 | Iowa Energy | D-League | Memphis Grizzlies | Unrestricted free agent | |
| Wayne Selden Jr. | October 29 | Iowa Energy | D-League | Memphis Grizzlies | Unrestricted free agent | |
| James Webb III | October 29 | Delaware 87ers | D-League | Philadelphia 76ers | Unrestricted free agent | |
| Anthony Brown | October 30 | Erie BayHawks | D-League | Los Angeles Lakers | Unrestricted free agent | |
| Shannon Brown | October 30 | Grand Rapids Drive | D-League | Miami Heat | Unrestricted free agent | |
| Kyle Collinsworth | October 30 | Texas Legends | D-League | Dallas Mavericks | Unrestricted free agent | |
| Jaleel Cousins | October 30 | Texas Legends | D-League | Dallas Mavericks | Unrestricted free agent | |
| Julian Jacobs | October 30 | Los Angeles D-Fenders | D-League | Los Angeles Lakers | Unrestricted free agent | |
| Trey Freeman | October 30 | Grand Rapids Drive | D-League | Detroit Pistons | Unrestricted free agent | |
| Brady Heslip | October 30 | Raptors 905 | D-League | Toronto Raptors | Unrestricted free agent | |
| Keith Hornsby | October 30 | Texas Legends | D-League | Dallas Mavericks | Unrestricted free agent | |
| Nikola Jovanović | October 30 | Grand Rapids Drive | D-League | Detroit Pistons | Unrestricted free agent | |
| Josh Magette* | October 30 | Los Angeles D-Fenders | D-League | Atlanta Hawks | Unrestricted free agent | |
| Ray McCallum Jr. | October 30 | Grand Rapids Drive | D-League | Detroit Pistons | Unrestricted free agent | |
| Yanick Moreira | October 30 | Raptors 905 | D-League | Toronto Raptors | Unrestricted free agent | |
| Mamadou N'Diaye | October 30 | Grand Rapids Drive | D-League | Detroit Pistons | Unrestricted free agent | |
| E. J. Singler* | October 30 | Raptors 905 | D-League | Toronto Raptors | Unrestricted free agent | |
| Axel Toupane | October 30 | Raptors 905 | D-League | Denver Nuggets | Unrestricted free agent | |
| Jarrod Uthoff | October 30 | Raptors 905 | D-League | Toronto Raptors | Unrestricted free agent | |
| Jameel Warney | October 30 | Texas Legends | D-League | Dallas Mavericks | Unrestricted free agent | |
| Travis Wear | October 30 | Los Angeles D-Fenders | D-League | Los Angeles Lakers | Unrestricted free agent | |
| C. J. Williams | October 30 | Texas Legends | D-League | Dallas Mavericks | Unrestricted free agent | |
| Gracin Bakumanya | October 31 | Northern Arizona Suns | D-League | Phoenix Suns | Unrestricted free agent | |
| Ben Bentil | October 31 | Fort Wayne Mad Ants | D-League | Indiana Pacers | Unrestricted free agent | |
| Elgin Cook | October 31 | Santa Cruz Warriors | D-League | Golden State Warriors | Unrestricted free agent | |
| Derek Cooke* | October 31 | Northern Arizona Suns | D-League | Phoenix Suns | Unrestricted free agent | |
| Isaiah Cousins | October 31 | Reno Bighorns | D-League | Sacramento Kings | Unrestricted free agent | |
| Eric Dawson | October 31 | Salt Lake City Stars | D-League | Utah Jazz | Unrestricted free agent | |
| Cleanthony Early | October 31 | Westchester Knicks | D-League | New York Knicks | Unrestricted free agent | |
| Perry Ellis | October 31 | Greensboro Swarm | D-League | Charlotte Hornets | Unrestricted free agent | |
| Quincy Ford | October 31 | Salt Lake City Stars | D-League | New Orleans Pelicans | Unrestricted free agent | |
| Marcus Georges-Hunt | October 31 | Maine Red Claws | D-League | Boston Celtics | Unrestricted free agent | |
| P. J. Hairston | October 31 | Rio Grande Valley Vipers | D-League | Houston Rockets | Unrestricted free agent | |
| Shaquille Harrison | October 31 | Northern Arizona Suns | D-League | Phoenix Suns | Unrestricted free agent | |
| Damien Inglis | October 31 | Westchester Knicks | D-League | New York Knicks | Unrestricted free agent | |
| Cameron Jones | October 31 | Santa Cruz Warriors | D-League | Golden State Warriors | Unrestricted free agent | |
| Jalen Jones | October 31 | Maine Red Claws | D-League | Boston Celtics | Unrestricted free agent | |
| Damion Lee | October 31 | Maine Red Claws | D-League | Boston Celtics | Unrestricted free agent | |
| Abdel Nader | October 31 | Maine Red Claws | D-League | Boston Celtics | Unsigned draft pick | |
| Le'Bryan Nash | October 31 | Rio Grande Valley Vipers | D-League | Houston Rockets | Unrestricted free agent | |
| J. J. O'Brien* | October 31 | Salt Lake City Stars | D-League | Milwaukee Bucks | Unrestricted free agent | |
| Chris Obekpa | October 31 | Santa Cruz Warriors | D-League | Golden State Warriors | Unrestricted free agent | |
| Marcus Paige | October 31 | Salt Lake City Stars | D-League | Utah Jazz | Unrestricted free agent | |
| Lamar Patterson | October 31 | Reno Bighorns | D-League | Sacramento Kings | Unrestricted free agent | |
| Gary Payton II | October 31 | Rio Grande Valley Vipers | D-League | Houston Rockets | Unrestricted free agent | |
| Alex Poythress | October 31 | Fort Wayne Mad Ants | D-League | Indiana Pacers | Unrestricted free agent | |
| Phil Pressey | October 31 | Santa Cruz Warriors | D-League | Golden State Warriors | Unrestricted free agent | |
| Chasson Randle | October 31 | Westchester Knicks | D-League | New York Knicks | Unrestricted free agent | |
| Jaleel Roberts | October 31 | Santa Cruz Warriors | D-League | Milwaukee Bucks | Unrestricted free agent | |
| Henry Sims | October 31 | Salt Lake City Stars | D-League | Utah Jazz | Unrestricted free agent | |
| Julyan Stone | October 31 | Fort Wayne Mad Ants | D-League | Indiana Pacers | Unrestricted free agent | |
| Rasheed Sulaimon | October 31 | Greensboro Swarm | D-League | Charlotte Hornets | Unrestricted free agent | |
| Isaiah Taylor | October 31 | Rio Grande Valley Vipers | D-League | Houston Rockets | Unrestricted free agent | |
| Mike Tobey | October 31 | Greensboro Swarm | D-League | Charlotte Hornets | Unrestricted free agent | |
| J. P. Tokoto | October 31 | Rio Grande Valley Vipers | D-League | New York Knicks | Unrestricted free agent | |
| Tyrone Wallace | October 31 | Salt Lake City Stars | D-League | Utah Jazz | Unsigned draft pick | |
| Scott Wood | October 31 | Santa Cruz Warriors | D-League | Golden State Warriors | Unrestricted free agent | |
| J. J. Avila | November 1 | Windy City Bulls | D-League | Chicago Bulls | Unrestricted free agent | |
| Beau Beech | November 1 | Long Island Nets | D-League | Brooklyn Nets | Unrestricted free agent | |
| Keith Benson* | November 1 | Sioux Falls Skyforce | D-League | Miami Heat | Unrestricted free agent | |
| Quinn Cook* | November 1 | Canton Charge | D-League | New Orleans Pelicans | Unrestricted free agent | |
| Chris Crawford* | November 1 | Canton Charge | D-League | Memphis Grizzlies | Unrestricted free agent | |
| Spencer Dinwiddie | November 1 | Windy City Bulls | D-League | Chicago Bulls | Unrestricted free agent | |
| Vashil Fernandez | November 1 | Sioux Falls Skyforce | D-League | Miami Heat | Unrestricted free agent | |
| Yogi Ferrell | November 1 | Long Island Nets | D-League | Brooklyn Nets | Unrestricted free agent | |
| Jonathan Holmes | November 1 | Canton Charge | D-League | Cleveland Cavaliers | Unrestricted free agent | |
| Stefan Janković | November 1 | Sioux Falls Skyforce | D-League | Miami Heat | Unrestricted free agent | |
| Egidijus Mockevičius | November 1 | Long Island Nets | D-League | Brooklyn Nets | Unrestricted free agent | |
| Luis Montero | November 1 | Sioux Falls Skyforce | D-League | Miami Heat | Unrestricted free agent | |
| Eric Moreland | November 1 | Canton Charge | D-League | Cleveland Cavaliers | Unrestricted free agent | |
| D'Vauntes Smith-Rivera | November 1 | Windy City Bulls | D-League | Chicago Bulls | Unrestricted free agent | |
| Thomas Walkup | November 1 | Windy City Bulls | D-League | Chicago Bulls | Unrestricted free agent | |
| Brianté Weber | November 1 | Sioux Falls Skyforce | D-League | Miami Heat | Unrestricted free agent | |
| Okaro White | November 1 | Sioux Falls Skyforce | D-League | Miami Heat | Unrestricted free agent | |
| Alex Caruso | November 3 | Oklahoma City Blue | D-League | Oklahoma City Thunder | Unrestricted free agent | |
| Daniel Hamilton | November 3 | Oklahoma City Blue | D-League | Oklahoma City Thunder | Unsigned draft pick | |
| Xavier Henry | November 3 | Oklahoma City Blue | D-League | Milwaukee Bucks | Unrestricted free agent | |
| Kaleb Tarczewski | November 3 | Oklahoma City Blue | D-League | Oklahoma City Thunder | Unrestricted free agent | |
| Reggie Williams* | November 3 | Oklahoma City Blue | D-League | Oklahoma City Thunder | Unrestricted free agent | |
| Chris Wright | November 3 | Oklahoma City Blue | D-League | Oklahoma City Thunder | Unrestricted free agent | |
| Nick Zeisloft | November 3 | Fort Wayne Mad Ants | D-League | Indiana Pacers | Unrestricted free agent | |
| Johnny O'Bryant III | November 11 | Northern Arizona Suns | D-League | Washington Wizards | Unrestricted free agent | |
| Cory Jefferson | November 12 | Austin Spurs | D-League | Cleveland Cavaliers | Unrestricted free agent | |
| Xavier Munford | November 12 | Greensboro Swarm | D-League | Los Angeles Clippers | Unrestricted free agent | |
| Walter Tavares | November 12 | Raptors 905 | D-League | Atlanta Hawks | Unrestricted free agent | |
| Kevin Murphy* | November 17 | Grand Rapids Drive | D-League | Orlando Magic | Unrestricted free agent | |
| Grant Jerrett | November 20 | Canton Charge | D-League | Portland Trail Blazers | Unrestricted free agent | |
| Chris Johnson* | November 23 | Rio Grande Valley Vipers | D-League | Utah Jazz | Unrestricted free agent | |
| Quincy Acy | November 28 | Los Angeles D-Fenders | D-League | Dallas Mavericks | Unrestricted free agent | |
| Archie Goodwin | November 30 | Greensboro Swarm | D-League | New Orleans Pelicans | Unrestricted free agent | |
| Kendall Marshall | November 30 | Reno Bighorns | D-League | Utah Jazz | Unrestricted free agent | |
| Tony Wroten | December 1 | Texas Legends | D-League | Memphis Grizzlies | Unrestricted free agent | |
| John Holland* | December 9 | Canton Charge | D-League | Cleveland Cavaliers | Unrestricted free agent | |
| Yogi Ferrell* | December 10 | Long Island Nets | D-League | Brooklyn Nets | Unrestricted free agent | |
| Anthony Brown* | December 12 | Erie BayHawks | D-League | New Orleans Pelicans | Unrestricted free agent | |
| Gary Neal | December 16 | Westchester Knicks | D-League | Washington Wizards | Unrestricted free agent | |
| Will Bynum | December 23 | Windy City Bulls | D-League | Atlanta Hawks | Unrestricted free agent | |
| Reggie Williams* | January 3 | Oklahoma City Blue | D-League | New Orleans Pelicans | Unrestricted free agent | |
| R. J. Hunter | January 6 | Long Island Nets | D-League | Chicago Bulls | Unrestricted free agent | |
| Pierre Jackson* | January 8 | Texas Legends | D-League | Dallas Mavericks | Unrestricted free agent | |
| Ryan Kelly | January 13 | Maine Red Claws | D-League | Atlanta Hawks | Unrestricted free agent | |
| Aaron Harrison* | January 15 | Greensboro Swarm | D-League | Charlotte Hornets | Unrestricted free agent | |
| Hollis Thompson | January 25 | Austin Spurs | D-League | Philadelphia 76ers | Unrestricted free agent | |
| Troy Williams | February 3 | Iowa Energy | D-League | Memphis Grizzlies | Unrestricted free agent | |
| John Jenkins | February 3 | Westchester Knicks | D-League | Phoenix Suns | Unrestricted free agent | |
| Mike Tobey | February 24 | Greensboro Swarm | D-League | Charlotte Hornets | Unrestricted free agent | |
| Ray McCallum Jr. | February 24 | Grand Rapids Drive | D-League | Charlotte Hornets | Unrestricted free agent | |
| Tyler Hansbrough | March 1 | Fort Wayne Mad Ants | D-League | Charlotte Hornets | Unrestricted free agent | |
| Axel Toupane | March 4 | Raptors 905 | D-League | Milwaukee Bucks | Unrestricted free agent | |
| Reggie Williams | March 7 | Oklahoma City Blue | D-League | New Orleans Pelicans | Unrestricted free agent | |
| Ben Bentil | March 9 | Fort Wayne Mad Ants | D-League | Dallas Mavericks | Unrestricted free agent | |
| Quinn Cook | March 9 | Canton Charge | D-League | Dallas Mavericks | Unrestricted free agent | |
| Justin Harper | March 13 | Los Angeles D-Fenders | D-League | Philadelphia 76ers | Unrestricted free agent | |
| Hollis Thompson | March 17 | Austin Spurs | D-League | New Orleans Pelicans | Unrestricted free agent | |
| Jarnell Stokes | March 23 | Sioux Falls Skyforce | D-League | Denver Nuggets | Unrestricted free agent | |

=== Going overseas ===
| * | Denotes international players who returned to their home country |

| Player | Date signed | New team | New country | NBA team | NBA contract status | Ref |
|---|---|---|---|---|---|---|
| Sonny Weems | June 14 | Maccabi FOX Tel Aviv | Israel | Philadelphia 76ers | Unrestricted free agent | |
| Zhou Qi* | June 24 | Xinjiang Flying Tigers | China | Houston Rockets | Unsigned draft pick | |
| James Anderson | June 27 | Darüşşafaka Doğuş | Turkey | Sacramento Kings | Unrestricted free agent | |
| Wang Zhelin* | June 28 | Fujian Sturgeons | China | Memphis Grizzlies | Unsigned draft pick | |
| Sergey Karasev* | July 1 | Zenit Saint Petersburg | Russia | Brooklyn Nets | Unrestricted free agent | |
| Rade Zagorac* | July 2 | Mega Leks | Serbia | Memphis Grizzlies | Unsigned draft pick | |
| Ante Žižić* | July 7 | Cibona Zagreb | Croatia | Boston Celtics | Unsigned draft pick | |
| Furkan Korkmaz* | July 8 | Anadolu Efes | Turkey | Philadelphia 76ers | Unsigned draft pick | |
| Cameron Bairstow* | July 18 | Brisbane Bullets | Australia | Detroit Pistons | Unrestricted free agent | |
| Isaia Cordinier* | July 18 | Antibes Sharks | France | Atlanta Hawks | Unsigned draft pick | |
| Donald Sloan | July 20 | Guangdong Southern Tigers | China | Brooklyn Nets | Unrestricted free agent | |
| Guerschon Yabusele | July 21 | Shanghai Sharks | China | Boston Celtics | Unsigned draft pick | |
| Petr Cornelie* | July 21 | Le Mans Sarthe | France | Denver Nuggets | Unsigned draft pick | |
| David Michineau* | July 22 | Hyères-Toulon | France | Los Angeles Clippers | Unsigned draft pick | |
| Andrea Bargnani | July 27 | Baskonia | Spain | Brooklyn Nets | Unrestricted free agent | |
| Carlos Boozer | July 27 | Guangdong Southern Tigers | China | Los Angeles Lakers | Unrestricted free agent | |
| Amar'e Stoudemire | August 1 | Hapoel Jerusalem | Israel | New York Knicks | Retired from the NBA, but continuing playing career | |
| Andrew Goudelock | August 2 | Maccabi FOX Tel Aviv | Israel | Houston Rockets | Unrestricted free agent | |
| Duje Dukan* | August 3 | Cedevita Zagreb | Croatia | Sacramento Kings | Unrestricted free agent | |
| Shayne Whittington | August 7 | Río Natura Monbús | Spain | Indiana Pacers | Unrestricted free agent | |
| Shane Larkin | August 10 | Baskonia | Spain | Brooklyn Nets | Unrestricted free agent | |
| Devyn Marble | August 10 | Aris Thessaloniki | Greece | Los Angeles Clippers | Unrestricted free agent | |
| JJ Hickson | August 20 | Fujian Sturgeons | China | Washington Wizards | Unrestricted free agent | |
| Jeff Adrien | August 22 | Bnei Herzliya | Israel | New Orleans Pelicans | Unrestricted free agent | |
| Bryce Cotton | August 27 | Anadolu Efes | Turkey | Memphis Grizzlies | Unrestricted free agent | |
| DeJuan Blair | September 7 | Jiangsu Tongxi | China | Phoenix Suns | Unrestricted free agent | |
| Tibor Pleiß | September 12 | Galatasaray Odeabank | Turkey | Philadelphia 76ers | Unrestricted free agent | |
| Jeff Ayres | September 22 | CSKA Moscow | Russia | Los Angeles Clippers | Unrestricted free agent | |
| Jason Thompson | September 25 | Shandong Golden Stars | China | Toronto Raptors | Unrestricted free agent | |
| Norris Cole | October 5 | Shandong Golden Stars | China | New Orleans Pelicans | Unrestricted free agent | |
| Jabari Brown | October 6 | Jilin Northeast Tigers | China | Milwaukee Bucks | Unrestricted free agent | |
| Richard Solomon | October 6 | Gravelines-Dunkerque | France | Atlanta Hawks | Unrestricted free agent | |
| Greg Smith | October 7 | İstanbul BŞB | Turkey | Minnesota Timberwolves | Unrestricted free agent | |
| Ryan Richards | October 20 | Karpoš Sokoli | Macedonia | San Antonio Spurs | Unrestricted free agent | |
| Steve Blake | October 22 | Sydney Kings | Australia | Detroit Pistons | Unrestricted free agent | |
| Shawn Dawson* | October 24 | Maccabi Rishon LeZion | Israel | New Orleans Pelicans | Unrestricted free agent | |
| Nate Wolters | October 24 | Crvena zvezda | Serbia | Denver Nuggets | Unrestricted free agent | |
| Markel Brown | October 25 | Khimki | Russia | Cleveland Cavaliers | Unrestricted free agent | |
| Zach Auguste | October 27 | Muratbey Uşak Sportif | Turkey | Los Angeles Lakers | Unrestricted free agent | |
| Chase Budinger | October 27 | Baskonia | Spain | Brooklyn Nets | Unrestricted free agent | |
| Jeremy Evans | October 29 | Khimki | Russia | Indiana Pacers | Unrestricted free agent | |
| Robbie Hummel | October 29 | Khimki | Russia | Denver Nuggets | Unrestricted free agent | |
| Nick Johnson | October 29 | Bayern Munich | Germany | Orlando Magic | Unrestricted free agent | |
| Yi Jianlian* | October 30 | Guangdong Southern Tigers | China | Los Angeles Lakers | Unrestricted free agent | |
| Orlando Johnson | November 1 | UNICS Kazan | Russia | Milwaukee Bucks | Unrestricted free agent | |
| Jorge Gutiérrez | November 8 | Trabzonspor Medical Park | Turkey | Brooklyn Nets | Unrestricted free agent | |
| Josh Smith | November 8 | Sichuan Blue Whales | China | Houston Rockets | Unrestricted free agent | |
| Casper Ware | November 14 | Melbourne United | Australia | Washington Wizards | Unrestricted free agent | |
| D. J. Kennedy | November 16 | Guangzhou Long-Lions | China | Denver Nuggets | Unrestricted free agent | |
| D. J. Stephens | November 21 | Budivelnyk | Ukraine | Memphis Grizzlies | Unrestricted free agent | |
| Vince Hunter | November 26 | Avtodor Saratov | Russia | Memphis Grizzlies | Unrestricted free agent | |
| Drew Crawford | November 28 | MHP Riesen Ludwigsburg | Germany | Toronto Raptors | Unrestricted free agent | |
| Chris Copeland | December 5 | Tofaş | Turkey | New Orleans Pelicans | Unrestricted free agent | |
| Ryan Hollins | December 5 | Herbalife Gran Canaria | Spain | Memphis Grizzlies | Unrestricted free agent | |
| Toure' Murry | December 5 | Yeşilgiresun Belediye | Turkey | Minnesota Timberwolves | Unrestricted free agent | |
| Pablo Prigioni | December 5 | Baskonia | Spain | Houston Rockets | Unrestricted free agent | |
| Lorenzo Brown | December 8 | Zhejiang Golden Bulls | China | Detroit Pistons | Unrestricted free agent | |
| Royce White | December 8 | London Lightning | Canada | Sacramento Kings | Unrestricted free agent | |
| Andrew Andrews | December 11 | Best Balıkesir | Turkey | Charlotte Hornets | Unrestricted free agent | |
| Brandon Paul | December 13 | Anadolu Efes | Turkey | Philadelphia 76ers | Unrestricted free agent | |
| Robert Sacre | January 7 | Hitachi SunRockers Tokyo-Shibuya | Japan | New Orleans Pelicans | Unrestricted free agent | |
| Anthony Bennett | January 13 | Fenerbahçe | Turkey | Brooklyn Nets | Unrestricted free agent | |
| Nicolás Laprovíttola | January 18 | Baskonia | Spain | San Antonio Spurs | Unrestricted free agent | |
| Lou Amundson | March 23 | TNT KaTropa | Philippines | New York Knicks | Unrestricted free agent | |
| Jonathan Gibson | May 8 | Anhui Wenyi | China | Dallas Mavericks | Unrestricted free agent | |
| Arinze Onuaku | June 8 | Hunan | China | Orlando Magic | Unrestricted free agent | |

=== Released ===
==== Waived ====
| Player | Date waived | Former team | Ref |
|---|---|---|---|
| Tony Wroten | June 22 | New York Knicks | |
| Damien Inglis | June 29 | Milwaukee Bucks | |
| Johnny O'Bryant III | June 29 | Milwaukee Bucks | |
| Jarrett Jack | June 30 | Brooklyn Nets | |
| Greg Smith | June 30 | Minnesota Timberwolves | |
| Caron Butler | July 4 | Sacramento Kings | |
| Duje Dukan | July 4 | Sacramento Kings | |
| Joel Anthony | July 7 | Detroit Pistons | |
| Cameron Bairstow | July 7 | Detroit Pistons | |
| Spencer Dinwiddie | July 7 | Chicago Bulls | |
| Drew Gooden | July 7 | Washington Wizards | |
| Cliff Alexander | July 8 | Portland Trail Blazers | |
| JaVale McGee | July 8 | Dallas Mavericks | |
| Andrew Goudelock | July 9 | Houston Rockets | |
| Tim Duncan (R) | July 11 | San Antonio Spurs | |
| Tony Wroten | July 11 | Memphis Grizzlies | |
| Toney Douglas | July 12 | New Orleans Pelicans | |
| Lamar Patterson | July 12 | Atlanta Hawks | |
| Devyn Marble | July 15 | Los Angeles Clippers | |
| Branden Dawson | July 17 | Los Angeles Clippers | |
| Sasha Kaun (R) | July 17 | Philadelphia 76ers | |
| Amar'e Stoudemire (R) | July 26 | New York Knicks | |
| Shayne Whittington | July 29 | Indiana Pacers | |
| Dahntay Jones | July 30 | Cleveland Cavaliers | |
| Kendall Marshall | August 26 | Utah Jazz | |
| John Holland | August 31 | Boston Celtics | |
| Carl Landry | August 31 | Philadelphia 76ers | |
| Tibor Pleiß | August 31 | Philadelphia 76ers | |
| Xavier Henry | September 20 | Milwaukee Bucks | |
| Kevin Garnett (R) | September 23 | Minnesota Timberwolves | |
| Elton Brand (R) | October 23 | Philadelphia 76ers | |
| Walter Tavares | October 31 | Atlanta Hawks | |
| Jordan Farmar | November 7 | Sacramento Kings | |
| Lance Stephenson | November 7 | New Orleans Pelicans | |
| Greivis Vásquez | November 9 | Brooklyn Nets | |
| Jarnell Stokes | November 15 | Denver Nuggets | |
| Quincy Acy | November 18 | Dallas Mavericks | |
| Archie Goodwin | November 20 | New Orleans Pelicans | |
| Bobby Brown | December 5 | Houston Rockets | |
| Yogi Ferrell | December 8 | Brooklyn Nets | |
| Anthony Brown | December 9 | New Orleans Pelicans | |
| Toney Douglas | December 15 | Memphis Grizzlies | |
| Jonathan Gibson | December 27 | Dallas Mavericks | |
| Nicolás Laprovíttola | December 27 | San Antonio Spurs | |
| R. J. Hunter | December 29 | Chicago Bulls | |
| Reggie Williams | January 1 | New Orleans Pelicans | |
| Aaron Harrison | January 3 | Charlotte Hornets | |
| Hollis Thompson | January 4 | Philadelphia 76ers | |
| Alonzo Gee | January 6 | Denver Nuggets | |
| Pierre Jackson | January 6 | Dallas Mavericks | |
| John Jenkins | January 6 | Phoenix Suns | |
| Ryan Kelly | January 6 | Atlanta Hawks | |
| Arinze Onuaku | January 6 | Orlando Magic | |
| John Lucas III | January 7 | Minnesota Timberwolves | |
| Anthony Bennett | January 9 | Brooklyn Nets | |
| Mo Williams | January 18 | Denver Nuggets | |
| Mo Williams | January 21 | Philadelphia 76ers | |
| Mo Williams | January 24 | Denver Nuggets | |
| Troy Williams | January 30 | Memphis Grizzlies | |
| Steve Novak | February 2 | Milwaukee Bucks | |
| Anderson Varejão | February 3 | Golden State Warriors | |
| Derrick Williams | February 6 | Miami Heat | |
| Chris Andersen | February 13 | Charlotte Hornets | |
| Matt Barnes | February 20 | Sacramento Kings | |
| Terrence Jones | February 23 | New Orleans Pelicans | |
| Marcus Thornton | February 23 | Brooklyn Nets | |
| Deron Williams | February 23 | Dallas Mavericks | |
| Chasson Randle | February 24 | Philadelphia 76ers | |
| Mike Scott | February 24 | Phoenix Suns | |
| Jared Sullinger | February 24 | Phoenix Suns | |
| Omri Casspi | February 25 | New Orleans Pelicans | |
| Marcelo Huertas | February 25 | Houston Rockets | |
| Lamar Patterson | February 26 | Atlanta Hawks | |
| Andrew Bogut | February 27 | Philadelphia 76ers | |
| José Calderón | February 27 | Los Angeles Lakers | |
| Brandon Jennings | February 27 | New York Knicks | |
| Luis Scola | February 27 | Brooklyn Nets | |
| José Calderón | March 1 | Golden State Warriors | |
| Jordan McRae | March 1 | Cleveland Cavaliers | |
| Danuel House | March 2 | Washington Wizards | |
| Andrew Bogut | March 13 | Cleveland Cavaliers | |
| Toney Douglas | March 18 | Memphis Grizzlies | |
| Rodney Stuckey | March 29 | Indiana Pacers | |
| Terrence Jones | April 1 | Milwaukee Bucks | |
| C.J. Wilcox | April 3 | Orlando Magic | |
| Cliff Alexander | April 4 | Brooklyn Nets | |
| Prince Ibeh | April 4 | Brooklyn Nets | |
| DeAndre Liggins | April 9 | Cleveland Cavaliers | |
| Larry Sanders | April 12 | Cleveland Cavaliers | |

(R) Retirements

==== Training camp cuts ====
All players listed did not make the final roster.

| Atlanta Hawks | Boston Celtics | Brooklyn Nets | Charlotte Hornets | Chicago Bulls |
|---|---|---|---|---|
| Will Bynum; Matt Costello; Jarrett Jack; Ryan Kelly; Josh Magette; Richard Solomon | Ben Bentil; Marcus Georges-Hunt; R. J. Hunter; Jalen Jones; Ryan Kelly; Damion Lee | Beau Beech; Chase Budinger; Yogi Ferrell; Jorge Gutiérrez; Egidijus Mockevičius | Andrew Andrews; Perry Ellis; Rasheed Sulaimon; Mike Tobey | J. J. Avila; Spencer Dinwiddie; Vince Hunter; D'Vauntes Smith-Rivera; Thomas Walkup |
| Cleveland Cavaliers | Dallas Mavericks | Denver Nuggets | Detroit Pistons | Golden State Warriors |
| Markel Brown; Toney Douglas; John Holland; Jonathan Holmes; Cory Jefferson; Dahntay Jones; Eric Moreland | Kyle Collinsworth; Jaleel Cousins; Jonathan Gibson; Keith Hornsby; Jameel Warney; C. J. Williams | Robbie Hummel; D. J. Kennedy; JaKarr Sampson; Axel Toupane; Nate Wolters | Lorenzo Brown; Trey Freeman; Nikola Jovanović; Ray McCallum Jr.; Mamadou N'Diaye | Elgin Cook; Cameron Jones; Chris Obekpa; Phil Pressey; Elliot Williams; Scott Wood |
| Houston Rockets | Indiana Pacers | Los Angeles Clippers | Los Angeles Lakers | Memphis Grizzlies |
| P. J. Hairston; Le'Bryan Nash; Gary Payton II; Pablo Prigioni; Isaiah Taylor | Ben Bentil; Jeremy Evans; Alex Poythress; Julyan Stone; Nick Zeisloft | Xavier Munford; Dorell Wright | Zach Auguste; Anthony Brown; Julian Jacobs; Travis Wear; Yi Jianlian | Jordan Adams; Matt Costello; Chris Crawford; Kellen Dunham; Vince Hunter; JaKarr Sampson; Wayne Selden Jr.; D. J. Stephens; Tony Wroten |
| Miami Heat | Milwaukee Bucks | Minnesota Timberwolves | New Orleans Pelicans | New York Knicks |
| Keith Benson; Vashil Fernandez; Stefan Janković; Luis Montero; Beno Udrih; Brianté Weber; Okaro White | Jabari Brown; Orlando Johnson; J. J. O'Brien; Jaleel Roberts | Rasual Butler; Toure' Murry | Chris Copeland; Quinn Cook; Shawn Dawson; Quincy Ford; Alonzo Gee; Robert Sacre | Lou Amundson; Cleanthony Early; Damien Inglis; Chasson Randle; J. P. Tokoto |
| Oklahoma City Thunder | Orlando Magic | Philadelphia 76ers | Phoenix Suns | Portland Trail Blazers |
| Alex Caruso; Mitch McGary; Ronnie Price; Kaleb Tarczewski; Reggie Williams; Chris Wright | Cliff Alexander; Branden Dawson; Ramon Galloway; Nick Johnson; Kevin Murphy | Anthony Barber; Elton Brand; Dionte Christmas; Shawn Long; Brandon Paul; James Webb III | Gracin Bakumanya; Derek Cooke; Archie Goodwin; Shaquille Harrison | Grant Jerrett; Luis Montero; Greg Stiemsma |
| Sacramento Kings | San Antonio Spurs | Toronto Raptors | Utah Jazz | Washington Wizards |
| Isaiah Cousins; Jordan Farmar; Lamar Patterson | Joel Anthony; Ryan Arcidiacono; Patricio Garino; Livio Jean-Charles; Ryan Richards | Drew Crawford; Brady Heslip; Yanick Moreira; E. J. Singler; Jarrod Uthoff | Eric Dawson; Quincy Ford; Chris Johnson; Marcus Paige; Henry Sims | Jarell Eddie; Johnny O'Bryant III; Casper Ware |

== Draft ==
=== 2016 NBA draft ===
The 2016 NBA draft was held on June 23, 2016, at the Barclays Center in Brooklyn.

==== First round ====
| Pick | Player | Date signed | Team | School/club team | Ref |
|---|---|---|---|---|---|
| 1 | Ben Simmons | July 2 | Philadelphia 76ers | LSU (Fr.) | |
| 2 | Brandon Ingram | August 23 | Los Angeles Lakers | Duke (Fr.) | |
| 3 | Jaylen Brown | July 27 | Boston Celtics | California (Fr.) | |
| 4 | Dragan Bender | July 7 | Phoenix Suns | Maccabi FOX Tel Aviv (Israel) | |
| 5 | Kris Dunn | July 5 | Minnesota Timberwolves | Providence (Jr.) | |
| 6 | Buddy Hield | July 22 | New Orleans Pelicans | Oklahoma (Sr.) | |
| 7 | Jamal Murray | July 19 | Denver Nuggets | Kentucky (Fr.) | |
| 8 | Marquese Chriss | July 7 | Phoenix Suns | Washington (Fr.) | |
| 9 | Jakob Pöltl | July 8 | Toronto Raptors | Utah (So.) | |
| 10 | Thon Maker | July 30 | Milwaukee Bucks | Orangeville Prep/Athlete Institute (Canada HS Sr.) | |
| 11 | Domantas Sabonis | August 12 | Oklahoma City Thunder | Gonzaga (So.) | |
| 12 | Taurean Prince | July 14 | Atlanta Hawks | Baylor (Sr.) | |
| 13 | Georgios Papagiannis | July 13 | Sacramento Kings | Panathinaikos (Greece) | |
| 14 | Denzel Valentine | July 16 | Chicago Bulls | Michigan State (Sr.) | |
| 15 | Juan Hernangómez | July 28 | Denver Nuggets | Movistar Estudiantes (Spain) | |
| 16 | Guerschon Yabusele | — | Boston Celtics | Rouen Métropole (France) | |
| 17 | Wade Baldwin IV | July 15 | Memphis Grizzlies | Vanderbilt (So.) | |
| 18 | Henry Ellenson | July 18 | Detroit Pistons | Marquette (Fr.) | |
| 19 | Malik Beasley | July 11 | Denver Nuggets | Florida State (Fr.) | |
| 20 | Caris LeVert | July 14 | Brooklyn Nets | Michigan (Sr.) | |
| 21 | DeAndre' Bembry | July 14 | Atlanta Hawks | Saint Joseph's (Jr.) | |
| 22 | Malachi Richardson | July 12 | Sacramento Kings | Syracuse (Fr.) | |
| 23 | Ante Žižić | — | Boston Celtics | Cibona Zagreb (Croatia) | |
| 24 | Timothé Luwawu-Cabarrot | July 2 | Philadelphia 76ers | Mega Leks (Serbia) | |
| 25 | Brice Johnson | July 12 | Los Angeles Clippers | North Carolina (Sr.) | |
| 26 | Furkan Korkmaz | — | Philadelphia 76ers | Anadolu Efes (Turkey) | |
| 27 | Pascal Siakam | July 7 | Toronto Raptors | New Mexico State (So.) | |
| 28 | Skal Labissière | July 15 | Sacramento Kings | Kentucky (Fr.) | |
| 29 | Dejounte Murray | July 14 | San Antonio Spurs | Washington (Fr.) | |
| 30 | Damian Jones | July 13 | Golden State Warriors | Vanderbilt (Jr.) | |

==== Second round ====
| Pick | Player | Date signed | Team | School/club team | Ref |
|---|---|---|---|---|---|
| 31 | Deyonta Davis | July 10 | Memphis Grizzlies | Michigan State (Fr.) | |
| 32 | Ivica Zubac | July 7 | Los Angeles Lakers | Mega Leks (Serbia) | |
| 33 | Cheick Diallo | July 22 | New Orleans Pelicans | Kansas (Fr.) | |
| 34 | Tyler Ulis | July 7 | Phoenix Suns | Kentucky (So.) | |
| 35 | Rade Zagorac | — | Memphis Grizzlies | Mega Leks (Serbia) | |
| 36 | Malcolm Brogdon | July 29 | Milwaukee Bucks | Virginia (Sr.) | |
| 37 | Chinanu Onuaku | July 19 | Houston Rockets | Louisville (So.) | |
| 38 | Patrick McCaw | July 5 | Golden State Warriors | UNLV (So.) | |
| 39 | David Michineau | — | Los Angeles Clippers | Élan Chalon (France) | |
| 40 | Diamond Stone | July 14 | Los Angeles Clippers | Maryland (Fr.) | |
| 41 | Stephen Zimmerman | July 7 | Orlando Magic | UNLV (Fr.) | |
| 42 | Isaiah Whitehead | July 8 | Brooklyn Nets | Seton Hall (So.) | |
| 43 | Zhou Qi | — | Houston Rockets | Xinjiang Flying Tigers (China) | |
| 44 | Isaia Cordinier | — | Atlanta Hawks | ASC Denain-Voltaire PH (France) | |
| 45 | Demetrius Jackson | July 26 | Boston Celtics | Notre Dame (Jr.) | |
| 46 | A. J. Hammons | July 8 | Dallas Mavericks | Purdue (Sr.) | |
| 47 | Jake Layman | July 7 | Portland Trail Blazers | Maryland (Sr.) | |
| 48 | Paul Zipser | July 15 | Chicago Bulls | Bayern Munich (Germany) | |
| 49 | Michael Gbinije | July 14 | Detroit Pistons | Syracuse (Sr.) | |
| 50 | Georges Niang | July 11 | Indiana Pacers | Iowa State (Sr.) | |
| 51 | Ben Bentil | July 26 | Boston Celtics | Providence (So.) | |
| 52 | Joel Bolomboy | August 19 | Utah Jazz | Weber State (Sr.) | |
| 53 | Petr Cornelie | — | Denver Nuggets | Le Mans Sarthe (France) | |
| 54 | Kay Felder | August 5 | Cleveland Cavaliers | Oakland (Jr.) | |
| 55 | Marcus Paige | August 22 | Utah Jazz | North Carolina (Sr.) | |
| 56 | Daniel Hamilton | — | Oklahoma City Thunder | Connecticut (So.) | |
| 57 | Wang Zhelin | — | Memphis Grizzlies | Fujian Sturgeons (China) | |
| 58 | Abdel Nader | — | Boston Celtics | Iowa State (Sr.) | |
| 59 | Isaiah Cousins | September 6 | Sacramento Kings | Oklahoma (Sr.) | |
| 60 | Tyrone Wallace | — | Utah Jazz | California (Sr.) | |

=== Previous years' draftees ===
| Draft | Pick | Player | Date signed | Team | Previous team | Ref |
|---|---|---|---|---|---|---|
| 2015 | 35 | Willy Hernangómez | July 7 | New York Knicks | Real Madrid (Spain) | |
| 2015 | 44 | Andrew Harrison | July 10 | Memphis Grizzlies | Iowa Energy (D-League) | |
| 2011 | 42 | Dāvis Bertāns | July 14 | San Antonio Spurs | Baskonia (Spain) | |
| 2014 | 12 | Dario Šarić | July 15 | Philadelphia 76ers | Anadolu Efes (Turkey) | |
| 2012 | 32 | Tomáš Satoranský | July 21 | Washington Wizards | FC Barcelona Lassa (Spain) | |
| 2013 | 28 | Livio Jean-Charles | July 22 | San Antonio Spurs | ASVEL (France) | |
| 2013 | 32 | Álex Abrines | July 23 | Oklahoma City Thunder | FC Barcelona Lassa (Spain) | |
| 2014 | 55 | Semaj Christon | August 20 | Oklahoma City Thunder | Consultinvest Pesaro (Italy) | |

=== Renounced draft rights ===
| Draft | Pick | Player | Date of rights' renouncement | Former team | Ref |
|---|---|---|---|---|---|
| 2013 | 53 | Colton Iverson | August 25 | Boston Celtics | |
| 2014 | 50 | Alec Brown | September 17 | Phoenix Suns | |
| 2012 | 56 | Tomislav Zubčić | September 17 | Oklahoma City Thunder | |
| 2012 | 59 | Marcus Denmon | September 23 | San Antonio Spurs | |
