= Gracin Bakumanya =

Congolese basketball player

No. 32 – Satya Wacana Saints
- Position: Center
- League: IBL

Personal information
- Born: 27 July 1997 (age 29) Kinshasa, DR Congo
- Listed height: 6 ft 11 in (2.11 m)
- Listed weight: 246 lb (112 kg)

Career information
- High school: Pantego Christian Academy (Arlington, Texas)
- NBA draft: 2016: undrafted
- Playing career: 2015–present

Career history
- 2015–2016: Antibes Sharks
- 2016–2017: Northern Arizona Suns
- 2017: Wisconsin Herd
- 2018–2019: Spartak Subotica
- 2019–2020: Toufargan Azarshahr
- 2021–2022: Zamora
- 2024: Al Sadd
- 2025–present: Satya Wacana Salatiga
- Stats at Basketball Reference

Bologni Gracin Bakumanya (born 27 July 1997) is a Congolese professional basketball player for Satya Wacana Salatiga of the Indonesian Basketball League (IBL). In 2013, he arrived in the United States for the first time and attended Pantego Christian Academy in Arlington, Texas, before returning to Europe in 2014.

== Early life and career ==
Discovered in his native Kinshasa, the capital of the Democratic Republic of the Congo, Bakumanya started his career in Spain with Torrelodones in the summer of 2011. After playing well at the junior level throughout his two-plus year stint in Spain, he was brought to the United States in 2013 to attend a prep school. In the spring of 2013, Bakumanya was reportedly connected to St. Anthony High School in New Jersey and the Montverde Academy in Florida, but ultimately enrolled at Pantego Christian Academy in Arlington, Texas. Before long, Bakumanya found himself back in Europe as his English simply wasn't up to par at the time. He briefly resided in Belgium before joining Antibes Sharks in 2014.

== Professional career ==
Between 2014 and 2016, Bakumanya spent the majority of the time with Antibes Espoirs, the junior team of Antibes Sharks. In the 2015–16 season, Bakumanya averaged 14.3 points and 8.5 rebounds in 30 games with Antibes Espoirs. He also managed two games with Antibes Sharks in the LNB Pro A, with both appearances coming in December 2015.

Bakumanya went undrafted in the 2016 NBA draft as an international early entry candidate. In July 2016, he joined the Houston Rockets for the 2016 NBA Summer League. He appeared in two games for the Rockets, but failed to score. On 25 September 2016, he signed with the Phoenix Suns for training camp. He was later waived by the Suns on 10 October. On 31 October, he was acquired by the Northern Arizona Suns of the NBA Development League as an affiliate player of Phoenix. He made his debut for Northern Arizona on 18 November, recording five points and five rebounds in 13 minutes of action in a 92–80 win over the Salt Lake City Stars.

On 23 August 2017, Bakumanya was selected by the Wisconsin Herd in the NBA G League expansion draft.

On 2 March 2020, Bakumanya signed with Ferroviário de Maputo of the Basketball Africa League (BAL). However, the season was postponed due to the COVID-19 pandemic and he did not join Maputo.

In November 2021, Bakumanya signed with CB Zamora.

On 14 March 2025, Bakumanya signed with Satya Wacana Salatiga of the Indonesian Basketball League (IBL), replacing Jailan Haslem.

== See also ==
- List of foreign basketball players in Serbia
