= Scott Wood =

American professional basketball player (born 1990)

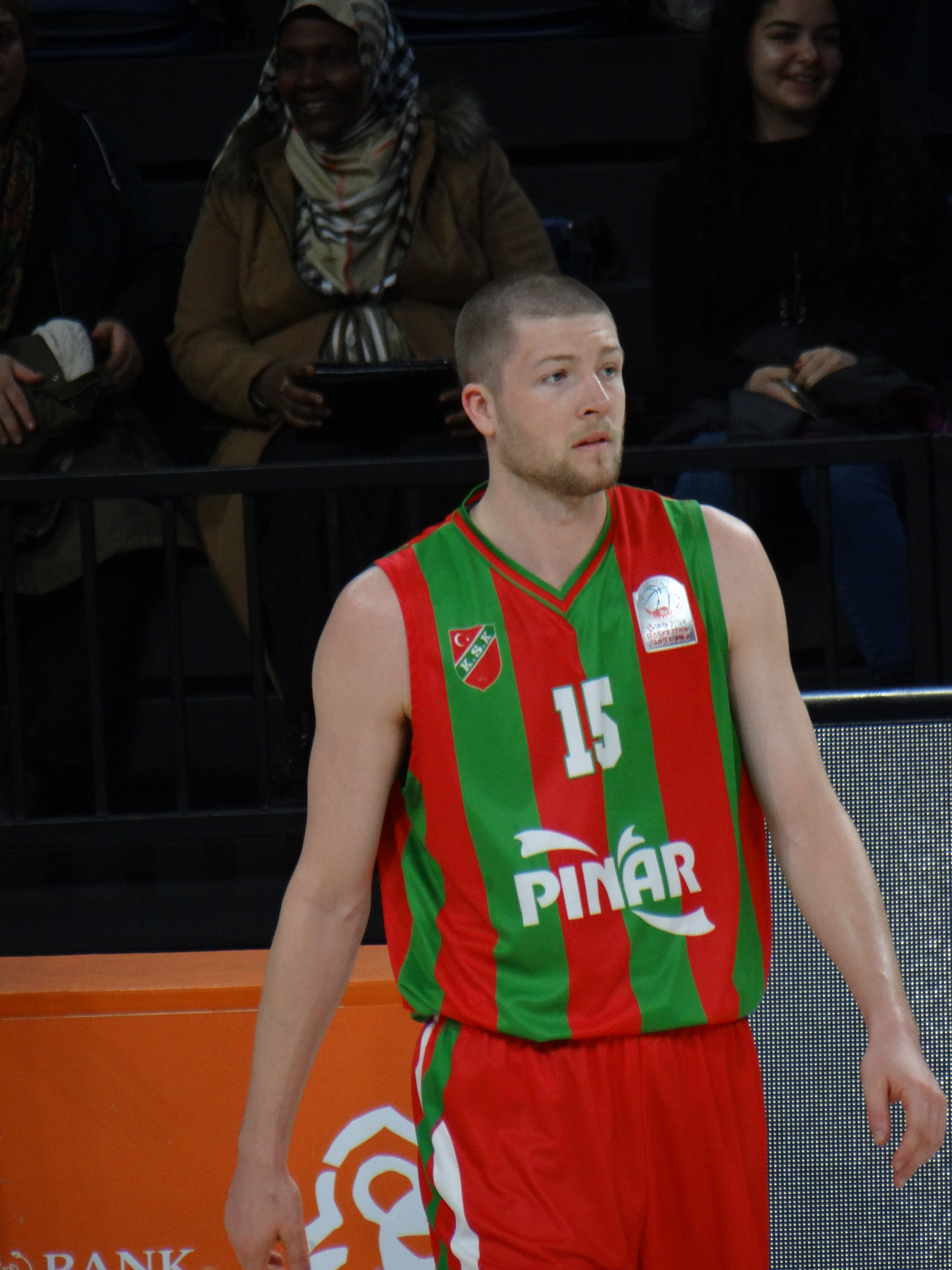
- Wood in 2018

Personal information
- Born: June 21, 1990 (age 36) Marion, Indiana, U.S.
- Listed height: 6 ft 5 in (1.96 m)
- Listed weight: 190 lb (86 kg)

Career information
- High school: Marion (Marion, Indiana)
- College: NC State (2009–2013)
- NBA draft: 2013: undrafted
- Playing career: 2013–2020
- Position: Shooting guard / small forward
- Number: 15

Career history
- 2013–2016: UCAM Murcia
- 2016–2017: Santa Cruz Warriors
- 2017–2018: Pınar Karşıyaka
- 2018–2019: BCM Gravelines
- 2019: Budućnost
- 2019–2020: Fuenlabrada

Career highlights
- NBA D-League Three-Point Contest champion (2017)
- Stats at Basketball Reference

Scott Douglas Wood II (born June 21, 1990) is an American former professional basketball player. He played college basketball for North Carolina State University.

== College career ==
Wood came to NC State from Marion High School in Marion, Indiana. Wood was a four-year starter for the Wolfpack, and was one of the top shooters in the Atlantic Coast Conference (ACC) for his career. As both a junior and senior, Wood led the conference in both free-throw and three-point shooting. Wood set the ACC record for consecutive made free throws in 2011–12 with 66, eclipsing the previous mark set by Duke's JJ Redick. Wood also holds the NC State school record for made three pointers with 334, passing Wolfpack legend Rodney Monroe. Wood finished his college career ranking 15th in school history in scoring with 1,468 points.

== Professional career ==
After going undrafted in the 2013 NBA draft, Wood joined the Los Angeles Clippers for the 2013 NBA Summer League. On August 10, 2013, he signed a 1+1 deal with UCAM Murcia of the Liga ACB. In 33 games for Murcia in 2013–14, he averaged 10.2 points and 1.6 rebounds per game.

In July 2014, Wood joined the Los Angeles Lakers for the 2014 NBA Summer League. He subsequently returned to Murcia for the 2014–15 season, and in 34 games, he averaged 8.7 points and 1.3 rebounds per game.

On July 7, 2015, Wood signed a one-year contract extension with UCAM Murcia. In 36 games for Murcia in 2015–16, he averaged 8.5 points and 2.1 rebounds per game.

On September 23, 2016, Wood signed with the Golden State Warriors. However, he was later waived by the Warriors on October 9 after appearing in two preseason games. On October 31, 2016, he was acquired by the Santa Cruz Warriors of the NBA Development League as an affiliate player of Golden State.

For the 2017–18 season, Wood signed with Pınar Karşıyaka of the Turkish Basketball Super League.

On July 28, 2018, he signed with BCM Gravelines-Dunkerque of the LNB Pro A.

On July 27, 2019, he signed with Budućnost VOLI of the Prva A Liga.

On December 6, 2019, he signed with Fuenlabrada of the Liga ACB.
