= Nick Zeisloft =

American basketball player (born 1992)

Personal information
- Born: December 18, 1992 (age 33) LaGrange, Illinois, U.S.
- Listed height: 6 ft 4 in (1.93 m)
- Listed weight: 208 lb (94 kg)

Career information
- High school: Lyons Township (La Grange, Illinois)
- College: Illinois State (2012–2014); Indiana (2014–2016)
- NBA draft: 2016: undrafted
- Playing career: 2016–2021
- Position: Shooting guard

Career history
- 2016–2017: Fort Wayne Mad Ants
- 2017–2018: Šiauliai
- 2018–2019: Leonis Roma
- 2019: Gipuzkoa
- 2019–2020: Santa Cruz Warriors
- 2020: Iberostar Tenerife
- 2020: Ionikos Nikaias
- Stats at Basketball Reference

Nicholas Joseph Zeisloft (born December 18, 1992) is an American former professional basketball player. He played college basketball for Illinois State and Indiana, and also had stints in Lithuania, Italy, Spain and Greece. Standing at 6 ft 4 in (1.93 m), he played at the shooting guard position.

== High school career ==
Zeisloft attended Lyons Township High School in La Grange, Illinois, where he played basketball for coach Tom Sloan and he led the Lions to a pair of regional championships. As a senior, he averaged 16.3 points, 6.1 rebounds and four assists per game, earning a 2011 McDonald's All-America nomination.

== College career ==
Zeisloft began his college career with Illinois State, where he played two seasons after a redshirt season. In his last season, he averaged 6.9 points and 3.4 rebounds per contest while shooting a team-best 35.5 percent from beyond the arc in 34 games (30 starts).

For his junior season, Zeisloft transferred to Indiana, where he was one of the Big Ten's best three-point shooters over two seasons. He averaged 6.6 points per game as a junior and 6.5 points per game as a senior while shooting 43.2 percent in 66 games. As a junior, he led the Big Ten in three-point shooting in conference games at 51.4 percent.

== Professional career ==
After going undrafted in the 2016 NBA draft, Zeisloft signed with the Indiana Pacers on September 8, 2016. He was later waived by the Pacers on October 17 after appearing in one preseason game. On November 3, 2016, he was acquired by the Fort Wayne Mad Ants of the NBA Development League as an affiliate player of the Pacers.

In the 2017–18 season, Zeisloft played with BC Šiauliai of the Lithuanian Basketball League. He averaged 12.1 points, 2.1 rebounds and 1.4 assists per game.

On July 31, 2018, he signed with Leonis Roma of the Italian second division. On February 11, 2019, Zeisloft signed with Gipuzkoa Basket of the Liga ACB.

For the 2019–20 season, Zeisloft signed with the Santa Cruz Warriors of the NBA G League.

On February 29, 2020, he signed with Iberostar Tenerife of the Spanish Liga ACB.

On September 4, 2020, Zeisloft moved to Greece and signed with Ionikos Nikaias.

On May 15, 2021, Zeisloft announced his retirement on his personal Instagram page.

== Personal life ==
Zeisloft is the son of Mark and Jennifer Zeisloft and is the oldest of three children. He graduated with a degree in finance from Illinois State University.
