= Derrick Jones Jr. =

American basketball player (born 1997)

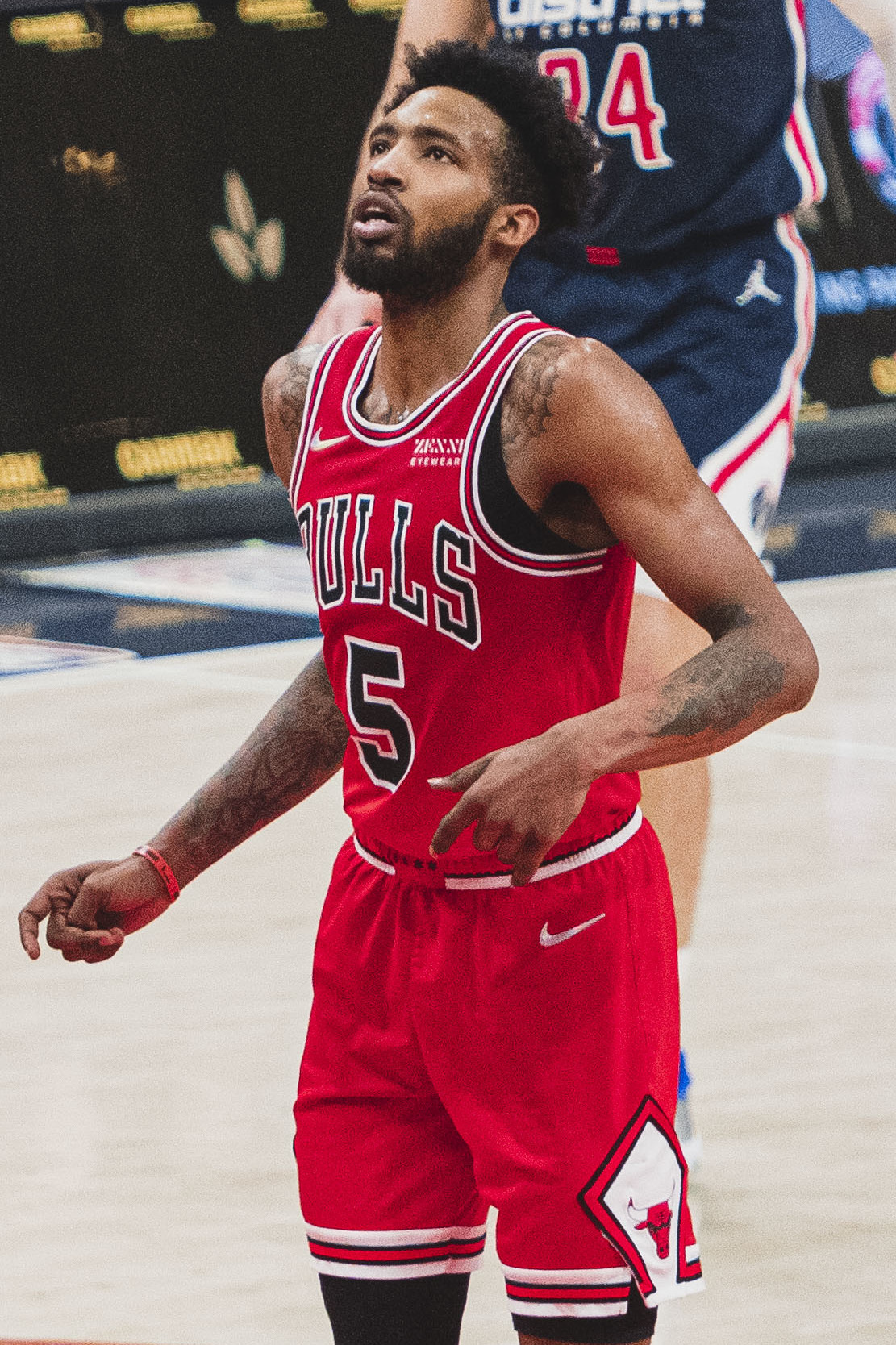
- Jones with the Chicago Bulls in 2022

No. 5 – Los Angeles Clippers
- Position: Small forward / power forward
- League: NBA

Personal information
- Born: February 15, 1997 (age 29) Chester, Pennsylvania, U.S.
- Listed height: 6 ft 6 in (1.98 m)
- Listed weight: 210 lb (95 kg)

Career information
- High school: Archbishop John Carroll (Radnor, Pennsylvania)
- College: UNLV (2015–2016)
- NBA draft: 2016: undrafted
- Playing career: 2016–present

Career history
- 2016–2017: Phoenix Suns
- 2016–2017: →Northern Arizona Suns
- 2017–2020: Miami Heat
- 2017–2018: →Sioux Falls Skyforce
- 2020–2021: Portland Trail Blazers
- 2021–2023: Chicago Bulls
- 2023–2024: Dallas Mavericks
- 2024–present: Los Angeles Clippers

Career highlights
- NBA Slam Dunk Contest champion (2020); Mr. Pennsylvania Basketball (2015)
- Stats at NBA.com
- Stats at Basketball Reference

Derrick Labrent Jones Jr. (born February 15, 1997) is an American professional basketball player for the Los Angeles Clippers of the National Basketball Association (NBA). He played college basketball for the UNLV Runnin' Rebels. He is nicknamed "Airplane Mode" because of his dunking ability.

== High school career ==
As a senior at Archbishop John Carroll High School in 2014–15, he was named the Southeastern Pennsylvania Player of the Year, the Delaware County Player of the Year, was the PIAA Triple-A Player of the Year, and was selected first-team All-Catholic League. Under coach Paul Romanczuk, Archbishop Carroll went 23–7 overall in 2014–15, including a 12–3 mark in conference play. In the semifinals of the state tournament, he recorded 30 points, 18 rebounds and five blocked shots while his rival Jonah Pournazarian scored 44. For the season, he averaged 19.2 points, 10.1 rebounds and 2.3 blocks per game. During his high school career, he scored 1,645 points, collected 1,029 rebounds and blocked 268 shots, finishing as the highest scorer in school history.

College recruiting
Name	Hometown	School	Height	Weight	Commit date
Derrick Jones; SF	Philadelphia, Pennsylvania	Archbishop John Carroll	6 ft 6 in (1.98 m)	180 lb (82 kg)	Nov 13, 2014
Derrick Jones; SF	Recruit ratings: Scout: Rivals: 247Sports: ESPN:				
Overall recruit ranking: Scout: 84 Rivals: 49 ESPN: 30
Note: In many cases, Scout, Rivals, 247Sports, On3, and ESPN may conflict in their listings of height and weight.; In these cases, the average was taken. ESPN grades are on a 100-point scale.; Sources:

== College career ==
Jones joined the UNLV Runnin' Rebels for his freshman season in the 2015–16 NCAA season. Prior to the start of the season, the NCAA Eligibility Center requested that the ACT investigate test scores recorded by Jones from a particular testing site in Baltimore, Maryland. Despite this, Jones was cleared by the NCAA prior to UNLV's first game against Cal Poly in November. Jones was the Runnin' Rebels' second-leading scorer in 2015–16. He averaged 11.5 points on 58.9 percent shooting and 4.5 rebounds in 30 games. Jones recorded four double-doubles during the season, including a career-high 26 points to go with 10 rebounds against Chaminade at the Maui Invitational Tournament.

On February 29, 2016, UNLV was notified by the ACT testing service that Jones' score had been cancelled. As a result, Jones was deemed ineligible to compete under NCAA rules and was forced to sit out the remaining three games of UNLV's season.

== Professional career ==
=== Phoenix Suns (2016–2017) ===
On April 7, 2016, Jones declared for the 2016 NBA draft, but left open the possibility of returning to UNLV or going to another college program by not hiring an agent. Later that month, Jones hired an agent and remained in the draft.

Jones ultimately went undrafted in the 2016 draft, and subsequently joined the Sacramento Kings for the 2016 NBA Summer League. However, due to a groin injury, he was unable to play for the Kings during the tournament.

On September 25, 2016, Jones signed with the Phoenix Suns for training camp. Jones secured an opening-night roster spot after impressing the Suns during training camp and preseason. He made his NBA debut in his home state against the Philadelphia 76ers on November 19, 2016, and recorded his first field goal in the NBA to finish with three points in three minutes against the San Antonio Spurs on December 15, 2016. Despite spending much of the 2016–17 season in the NBA Development League with the Northern Arizona Suns, Jones was selected to compete in the NBA Slam Dunk Contest. He went on to make it through to the final round of the Slam Dunk Contest, where he ultimately lost to Glenn Robinson III. On February 28, 2017, he scored eight points in a 130–112 loss to the Memphis Grizzlies. Two days later, he had another eight-point effort in a 123–103 win over the Charlotte Hornets. On March 11, 2017, in a 100–98 win over the Dallas Mavericks, Jones made his first start, logging two points, a season-high seven rebounds, and one assist. On March 28, 2017, he had his first double-digit scoring game of his career, scoring 13 points in a 95–91 loss to the Atlanta Hawks. On April 9, 2017, he scored a career-high 15 points in a 124–111 win over the Dallas Mavericks.

In July 2017, Jones joined the Suns for the 2017 NBA Summer League. In November 2017, he had multiple assignments to the Northern Arizona Suns of the NBA G League. On December 7, 2017, he was waived by the Suns. Jones appeared in 38 games with Phoenix over two seasons, averaging 4.7 points and 2.2 rebounds in 15.2 minutes.

On December 12, 2017, Jones was acquired by the Northern Arizona Suns, but did not appear in any games before signing with the Miami Heat later that month.

=== Miami Heat (2017–2020) ===
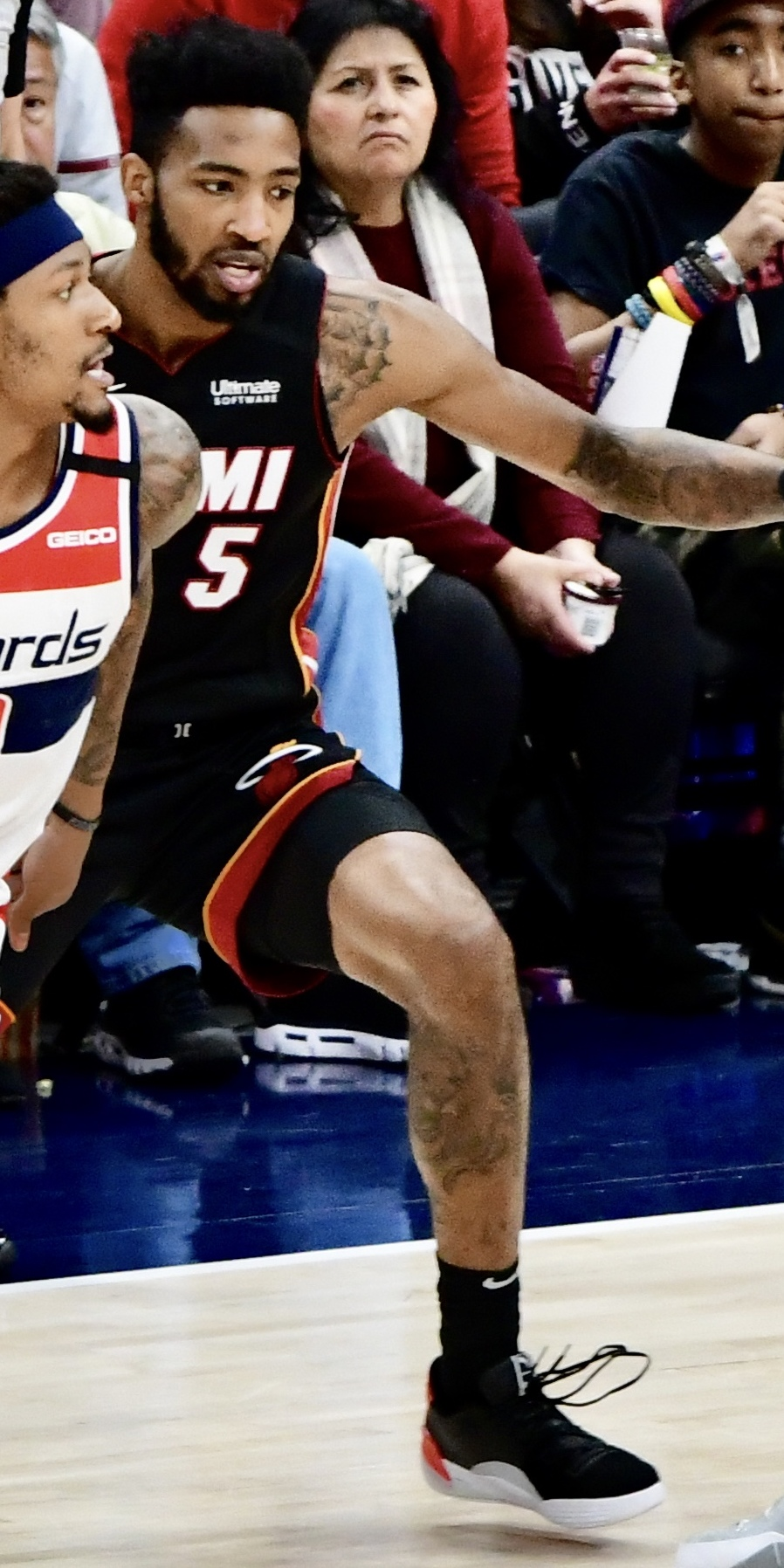
Jones with the Miami Heat in 2020

On December 31, 2017, Jones signed a two-way contract with the Miami Heat. On a two-way contract, Jones split his playing time between the Heat and their NBA G League affiliate, the Sioux Falls Skyforce. He made his first start for the Heat on January 9, 2018, in just his third game, recording eight points, five rebounds, one assist and two blocks in 28 minutes against the Toronto Raptors. On July 1, 2018, Jones signed a 2-year, $3.2 million standard contract with the Heat.

Jones won the Slam Dunk Contest over Aaron Gordon during the 2020 NBA All-Star Weekend. They both had perfect scores in their first two dunks in the second round, forcing an overtime round. After they both earned perfect scores on their initial dunks, Jones won by scoring a 48 after taking off just past the free throw line to complete a windmill dunk; Gordon received a 47 after dunking over 7-foot-6-inch (2.29 m) Tacko Fall. On August 14, 2020, Jones Jr. suffered a neck strain after colliding with Indiana center Goga Bitadze. He was stretchered off the court. The Heat reached the 2020 NBA Finals, but lost in 6 games to the Los Angeles Lakers.

=== Portland Trail Blazers (2020–2021) ===
On November 22, 2020, Jones signed a 2-year, $19 million contract with the Portland Trail Blazers.

=== Chicago Bulls (2021–2023) ===
On August 28, 2021, Jones was acquired, alongside a first and a second round pick, by the Chicago Bulls in a three-team sign-and-trade also involving the Cleveland Cavaliers. On January 12, 2022, during a 112–138 loss to the Brooklyn Nets, he suffered a right knee injury. The next day, the Bulls announced that he had a bone bruise and would miss at least 4-to-6 weeks, although the timetable was later upgraded to 2-to-4 weeks. On January 25, the Bulls announced that Jones had fractured his right index finger during a workout and would miss an additional 6-to-8 weeks. On the same day, however, he was upgraded to a timetable of 1-to-2 weeks in order to determine if he could play with a splint.

On July 6, 2022, Jones re-signed with the Bulls on a two-year, $6.6 million contract.

On June 21, 2023, Jones declined his $3.36 million player option to become a free agent.

=== Dallas Mavericks (2023–2024) ===
On August 18, 2023, Jones signed with the Dallas Mavericks. He made his debut for the Mavericks on October 25, 2023, in a 126–119 win over the San Antonio Spurs. Jones' time with the Mavericks marked a significant chapter in his career. Although initially coming off the bench, he earned a spot in the starting lineup later in the season due to his elite defensive play and impact on the court. During the playoffs, Jones' defense, athleticism and hustle were instrumental in several critical games, where his shot-blocking, perimeter defense and rebounding helped the Mavericks reach the NBA Finals. During this run, he primarily guarded the opposing team's best player, including Paul George, Shai Gilgeous-Alexander, and Anthony Edwards. Jones continued to improve his offensive game as well, showing flashes of increased confidence with his outside shot and becoming a reliable cutter to the basket. His presence helped solidify the Mavericks' rotation, and this season is considered the most impactful stretch of his NBA career. He helped the Mavericks reach the NBA Finals, but they lost to the Boston Celtics in five games.

=== Los Angeles Clippers (2024–present) ===
On July 10, 2024, Jones signed a three-year, $30 million contract with the Los Angeles Clippers. He made 77 appearances (55 starts) for Los Angeles during the 2024–25 NBA season, averaging 10.1 points, 3.4 rebounds, and 0.8 assists.

On November 17, 2025, Jones was ruled out for at least six weeks after being diagnosed with a sprained MCL in his right knee. Upon returning from injury, he made four appearances off of the bench, having previously started the first 13 games of the season. On January 4, 2026, Jones was ruled out for another six weeks after being diagnosed with a Grade 2 MCL sprained in the same knee.

== Career statistics ==
Legend
GP	Games played	GS	Games started	MPG	Minutes per game
FG%	Field goal percentage	3P%	3-point field goal percentage	FT%	Free throw percentage
RPG	Rebounds per game	APG	Assists per game	SPG	Steals per game
BPG	Blocks per game	PPG	Points per game	**Bold**	Career high
*	Led the league

=== NBA ===
==== Regular season ====
Year	Team	GP	GS	MPG	FG%	3P%	FT%	RPG	APG	SPG	BPG	PPG
2016–17	Phoenix	32	8	17.0	**.562**	.273	.707	2.5	.4	.4	.4	5.3
2017–18	Phoenix	6	0	5.5	.500	.000	**.833**	.7	.5	.2	.7	1.5
2017–18	Miami	14	8	15.2	.388	.188	.611	2.4	.4	.2	.6	3.7
2018–19	Miami	60	14	19.2	.494	.308	.607	**4.0**	.6	.8	.7	7.0
2019–20	Miami	59	16	23.3	.527	.280	.772	3.9	1.1	**1.0**	.6	8.5
2020–21	Portland	58	43	22.7	.484	.316	.648	3.5	.8	.6	.9	6.8
2021–22	Chicago	51	8	17.6	.538	.328	.800	3.3	.6	.5	.6	5.6
2022–23	Chicago	64	0	14.0	.500	.338	.738	2.4	.5	.5	.6	5.0
2023–24	Dallas	76	**66**	23.5	.483	.343	.713	3.3	1.0	.7	.7	8.6
2024–25	L.A. Clippers	**77**	55	24.3	.526	.356	.703	3.4	.8	**1.0**	.4	**10.1**
2025–26	L.A. Clippers	50	45	**27.0**	.499	**.359**	.763	3.5	**1.4**	.9	**1.0**	**10.1**
Career		547	263	20.9	.506	.330	.712	3.3	.8	.7	.7	7.5

==== Playoffs ====
Year	Team	GP	GS	MPG	FG%	3P%	FT%	RPG	APG	SPG	BPG	PPG
2020	Miami	15	0	6.5	.471	**.444**	.400	.8	.5	.4	.3	1.5
2021	Portland	2	0	5.0	.400	.000	—	.0	.0	.5	.0	2.0
2022	Chicago	5	0	11.8	.412	.273	.667	1.4	.4	.2	.0	3.8
2024	Dallas	**22***	**22***	**29.4**	**.481**	.369	**.733**	**3.5**	**1.2**	.5	1.0	**9.1**
2025	L.A. Clippers	7	1	18.4	.438	.300	.375	1.9	.3	**.6**	**1.3**	7.3
Career		51	23	18.5	.466	.346	.630	2.1	.7	.5	.7	5.8

=== College ===
Year	Team	GP	GS	MPG	FG%	3P%	FT%	RPG	APG	SPG	BPG	PPG
2015–16	UNLV	30	15	21.5	.589	.205	.594	4.5	.8	.9	1.3	11.5

== Personal life ==
Jones has one brother and two sisters.

In January 2023, Jones became engaged to his girlfriend during the Bulls' trip to Paris to play the Detroit Pistons.
