= 2016–17 Phoenix Suns season =

Performance of a professional basketball team

- Head coach: Earl Watson
- General manager: Ryan McDonough
- Owners: Robert Sarver
- Arena: Talking Stick Resort Arena

Results
- Record: 24–58 (.293)
- Place: Division: 5th (Pacific); Conference: 15th (Western)
- Playoff finish: Did not qualify
- Stats at Basketball Reference

Local media
- Television: Fox Sports Arizona
- Radio: KTAR

The 2016–17 Phoenix Suns season was the Phoenix Suns' 49th season in the NBA and their 24th season in the Talking Stick Resort Arena. It was also the first season with a team-owned D-League affiliate, called the Northern Arizona Suns, which relocated to the nearby Prescott Valley. The Suns failed to qualify for the playoffs for the seventh straight season.

This season featured a remarkable performance from sophomore Devin Booker who scored 70 points during a game vs. the Boston Celtics in March 2017, becoming the youngest NBA player to do so at the age of 20.

== Key dates ==
- April 19, 2016: The Suns removed the interim tag that Earl Watson was placed under as he signed a three-year deal worth around $7.5 million to be the team's newest full-time head coach moving forward.
- May 5, 2016: Former Senior Adviser and President of Basketball Operations Lon Babby steps down after six years of service with the team; assistant coaches Corey Gaines, Bob Hill, and Irving Roland, as well as assistant video coordinator Ross Geiger would not get their contracts renewed.
- May 17, 2016: The NBA Draft Lottery took place, with former rookie Devin Booker and Jenna Warren, a 16 year old Suns fan with Down syndrome, representing the team during the event, as well as the team's current vice president of basketball communications in Julie Fie taking part in seeing the very rare event of picks remaining exactly where they were at earlier in the season unfold in the lottery room for their selections.
- May 18, 2016: The Suns announced that former Portland Trail Blazers assistant coach Jay Triano would be the team's newest associate head coach.
- June 19, 2016: The NBA announces that the salary cap would increase from $70 million all the way up into $94 million, while the tax payroll for teams that would be forced to pay taxes for the amount they spend would be at $113 million and the salary floor would go up to $84.7 million.
- June 23, 2016: The 2016 NBA draft took place at the Barclays Center in Brooklyn, New York; the Suns would trade their 13th and 28th picks of the draft (which were Greece's Georgios Papagiannis and Haiti's Skal Labissière from Kentucky University respectively), as well as Serbia's Bogdan Bogdanović (a player they drafted from the 2014 NBA draft) and the Detroit Pistons' 2020 second-round pick to the Sacramento Kings for their 8th pick in power forward Marquese Chriss from the University of Washington in a trade idea the team came up with in the morning of the NBA draft. In addition to Marquese Chriss, the Suns also selected the Bosnian-born Croatian forward-center Dragan Bender (who previously played for the Maccabi Tel Aviv in Israel) with their 4th pick and Kentucky University's undersized, yet award decorated point guard Tyler Ulis with their 34th pick.
- June 25, 2016: The Phoenix Suns announced that former Suns player Tyrone Corbin would be one of the team's newest assistant coaches.
- June 27, 2016: It would be reported that the Suns would have two games being played at the Mexico City Arena in Mexico City, Mexico in January this next year. One of the games there would be against the Dallas Mavericks, while the other would be against the San Antonio Spurs.
- July 1, 2016: The NBA free agency period began; Jared Dudley would officially return to the Suns on a 3-year deal worth $30 million, being one of the few players from the team's last playoff run to return to the Suns.
- July 6, 2016: Another former Suns player, this time being Leandro Barbosa of the 73–9 Golden State Warriors, would return to Phoenix once again for the third time. This time, he signed a 2-year deal worth $8 million.
- July 7, 2016: The new July Moratorium Period begins, which means that players can now sign up with their new teams this season; the Suns also announced that the long-time NCAA Division I assistant coach Scott Duncan is going to be a new player development head coach for the team.
- July 17, 2016: Both rookie point guard Tyler Ulis and power forward/center Alan Williams would earn All-NBA Second Team Summer League Honors and All-NBA First Team Summer League Honors respectively during their 2016 NBA Summer League season in Las Vegas.
- July 20, 2016: It would officially be confirmed that the Phoenix Suns would play two games in the Mexico City Arena in Mexico City, Mexico as the home team there. Their first game would be on January 12, 2017, against the Dallas Mavericks. Two days later, they'd be playing their second game there on January 14 against the Tim Duncan-less San Antonio Spurs. The Suns would be the first NBA team to hold two NBA games at Mexico City during the same season, as well as hold this news under the 25th anniversary of the first NBA game that was ever played in Mexico. Both Mexico City games have tickets that would cost around 400 Mexican pesos together or 270 Mexican pesos apart from each other.
- July 27, 2016: Phoenix would officially announce that their newest assistant coaches/player development coaches for the season include Jay Triano, Tyrone Corbin, Nate Bjorkgren (who'd return from last season), former college teammate of Steve Nash, NBA player, and video coordinator/player development coach for the San Antonio Spurs in Marlon Garnett (as both assistant coach and player development coach, similar to Nate Bjorkgren last season), long-time college assistant coach Scott Duncan (for player development), and another returning assistant coach/player development coach in Jason Fraser, who's also for player development exclusively. In addition to them, the Suns announced that Chris Darnell would be the team's video coordinator with Long Beach State's Jason Tilton and video intern for the 73–9 Golden State Warriors and Team U.S.A. video coordinator Julian Mills being assistant video coordinators, as well as Michigan State's Quinton Sawyer joining up as the team's assistant athletic trainer and sports science coordinator.
- August 2, 2016: The preseason schedule for the Suns gets revealed.
- August 11, 2016: The NBA announces every team's official schedules for the season. The Suns will have two nationally televised games on ESPN and two games on TNT this year.
- August 24, 2016: The Phoenix Suns announced that their training camp regime would return to Flagstaff, Arizona for this season after having their previous season be near the downtown region around the old Arizona Veterans Memorial Coliseum.
- September 1, 2016: Footage from a trailer released by NBA 2K17 leaked out a new court design for the Phoenix Suns, which showcased only a minor change on the out-of-bounds region, going from black to purple to represent the older colors of the team; Alan Williams would get the second year of his contract fully guaranteed for the rest of this season due to not only the consistent performances he had during the two Summer League seasons he played for and improving from last season to this season in terms of production, but also putting in the work to transform his body and his skill-sets while also taking a big part of team and community efforts throughout the season (even excluding the fact that his mom, Jeri Williams, had a recent promotion to being the Chief of Police for Phoenix now.)
- September 6, 2016: The Suns officially unveiled their new, updated court design featuring a purple out-of-bounds region similar to the old court design from the 1990s, only it also includes every other design choice from the Suns' previous season on the court beyond the color of the out-of-bounds region and removing the hashtag from the "WE ARE PHX" slogan; during a concert performance by rapper Drake at the Talking Stick Resort Arena, he gave the Suns' Kentucky teammates a shout out while wearing a black Civic Pride "PHX" Phoenix Suns jersey with Devin Booker's number on it.
- September 13, 2016: The Phoenix Suns announced a couple late, last-minute additions to their staff with former NBA Finals champion and All-Star power forward/center Mehmet Okur joining the team as a player development coach, as well as Jason Hervey (not to be confused with the actor) from the Minnesota Timberwolves (and the Washington Wizards and Detroit Pistons before that) as an advanced scout.
- September 15, 2016: P. J. Tucker has a low back microdiscectomy procedure done to him. He's expected to be out sometime between six and eight weeks, thus allowing T. J. Warren some time to potentially start for the season now that he's the only considerable candidate at this time to start at small forward for right now; the Suns also would announce some of their training came invitees for the season, one of which includes the undrafted freshman known as Derrick Jones Jr. from the University of Nevada, Las Vegas.
- October 3, 2016: Head coach Earl Watson would confirm that the starting lineup for their first preseason game against the San Antonio Spurs (without Tim Duncan) would be the same starting lineup set for the regular season; their lineup would be Eric Bledsoe at point guard, Devin Booker at shooting guard (instead of Brandon Knight), T. J. Warren at small forward (even in the event P. J. Tucker returns to action), Jared Dudley at power forward over either one of the rookies (at this time), and Tyson Chandler at center over Alex Len. They would end their first preseason game with a 91–86 win over San Antonio.
- October 24, 2016: In a rather surprising move, the Suns decided to part ways with 2013 rookie Archie Goodwin despite having a fully guaranteed deal with the Suns this year, while also making sure they kept both John Jenkins and 2016 (undrafted) rookie Derrick Jones Jr. on the roster to start out this season. It was later on announced that the Suns were trying to trade Archie Goodwin at his own request before the season began, but could not find a good deal for him on time.
- October 26, 2016: The Phoenix Suns begin their regular season against the Sacramento Kings at home; it would also be announced before the game began by owner Robert Sarver that legendary sports announcer Al McCoy would enter the Phoenix Suns Ring of Honor on March 3, 2017, against the Oklahoma City Thunder.
- November 2, 2016: The Suns would win their first game of the season thanks to Eric Bledsoe hitting a game-winning, buzzer-beating three-pointer in a close 118–115 victory over the Portland Trail Blazers.
- November 3, 2016: The Phoenix Suns would announce their first transfer to the new affiliate Northern Arizona Suns squad out in the D-League, with latest addition Derrick Jones Jr. heading off to Prescott Valley in order to prepare for the team's first season under their new name.
- November 8, 2016: Rookie Marquese Chriss would gain his first official start of the season for the Suns.
- December 26, 2016: Rookie Dragan Bender would start earning more playing time moving forward into the season.
- January 6, 2017: The Suns decided to waive the non-guaranteed contract of John Jenkins after he managed to play only four games with the team this season.
- January 12, 2017: Phoenix would begin their two-game stint in Mexico City.
- January 14, 2017: The Phoenix Suns would end their stint in Mexico City with a 1–1 record by losing 113–108 to the Dallas Mavericks, but surprisingly beating the San Antonio Spurs by the final score of 108–105; Devin Booker would record 39 points in both games during that trip.
- January 25, 2017: Both Devin Booker and rookie Marquese Chriss would be named for Team U.S.A. in the Rising Stars Challenge for the NBA All-Star Weekend this year.
- January 27, 2017: The Suns would sign up veteran guard Ronnie Price for his third stint with the team under a 10-day contract.
- February 2, 2017: Marquese Chriss would be named the Western Conference's Rookie of The Month for his performances throughout the month of January. This would mark the first time a Suns player would be named for the NBA Rookie of The Month honor since Rookie of The Year winner Amar'e Stoudemire did it twice back in 2003. Besides Amar'e, Marquese would also be joined by Kevin Johnson and Armen Gilliam (both from 1988) as the only other players to earn the honor at least once; Derrick Jones Jr., another rookie for the Suns, would officially be named a contestant for the Slam Dunk Contest this year also; Devin Booker would also be announced as a participant for the Taco Bell Skills Challenge to go alongside his participation in the Rising Stars Challenge.
- February 6, 2017: Ronnie Price would sign a second 10-day contract, despite not playing a single game for the Suns at that time.
- February 8, 2017: Rookie Dragan Bender would have surgery on his right ankle to remove a bone spur there. As a result, he would miss the next 7–8 weeks of playing time, with the latest date for returning to action being April 2.
- February 17, 2017: The 2017 NBA All-Star Weekend taking place in New Orleans, Louisiana instead of Charlotte, North Carolina commenced.
- February 23, 2017: The trade deadline for this season officially concludes; Phoenix would get themselves the expiring contracts of Jared Sullinger and Mike Scott (as well as get themselves the draft rights of Cenk Akyol, the Raptors' 2017 and 2018 second-round picks, and cash considerations from both Atlanta and Toronto), with the Toronto Raptors acquiring fan-favorite P. J. Tucker and the Atlanta Hawks acquire a Top-55 protected second-round pick respectively.
- February 24, 2017: The Suns officially waive both of their top acquisitions from yesterday's trade deadline, Jared Sullinger and Mike Scott, as well as sign guard Ronnie Price for the rest of the season.
- March 3, 2017: Broadcaster Al McCoy would officially place himself alongside former players Dick Van Arsdale, Walter Davis, Kevin Johnson, Dan Majerle, Steve Nash, Tom Chambers, Alvan Adams, Charles Barkley, Connie Hawkins, and Paul Westphal (the last player also being a former Suns coach), coaches Cotton Fitzsimmons and John MacLeod, owner and general manager (and coach) Jerry Colangelo, and athletic trainer Joe Proski as the 15th member of the Phoenix Suns Ring of Honor during the Suns game against the Oklahoma City Thunder. The honor would help the Suns pull off a surprising 118–111 win over Russell Westbrook and the Oklahoma City Thunder.
- March 19, 2017: The Suns would sign Jarell Eddie to a 10-day contract after shutting down the likes of Tyson Chandler, Brandon Knight, and Eric Bledsoe (just to name a few players) for the rest of the season.
- March 23, 2017: The starting line-up of rookie Tyler Ulis, Devin Booker, undrafted rookie Derrick Jones Jr., rookie Marquese Chriss, and Alex Len would provide the youngest starting line-up in NBA history.
- March 24, 2017: Even though the Suns would lose 130–120 to the Boston Celtics, Devin Booker would break the team's highest scoring record of 60 points set by Tom Chambers back on the 27th anniversary of Tom Chambers' 60-point game against his former team at the time, the Seattle SuperSonics. Devin would record a career-high 70 points off of 21/40 shooting (24/26 free-throws made) that night.
- March 29, 2017: Jarell Eddie would sign a second 10-day contract after performing relatively well during his first 10-day contract.
- April 2, 2017: Rookie Dragan Bender would finally return to action after missing two months worth of games starting on February 2.
- April 9, 2017: The Suns would ultimately not sign Jarell Eddie to a multi-year deal; that honor would go to one of their affiliate D-League squad's most important members that season, Elijah Millsap of the Northern Arizona Suns.
- April 14, 2017: Devin Booker is confirmed to represent the Phoenix Suns during the 2017 NBA Draft Lottery; Tyler Ulis was named the Western Conference's Rookie of The Month for April for the performances he had throughout the shortened month. This would mark the second year in franchise history where multiple rookies from the Suns won Rookie of The Month honors.
- May 12, 2017: Devin Booker announces on Twitter that he would take another Suns fan, 11 year old Noah Smith, and his older brother Brad with him to the 2017 NBA draft Lottery. Noah Smith is a student at Navarette Elementary School and Special Olympics athlete that was born with a microdeletion syndrome, a disease that left him with a hole in his heart as an infant, which resulted in him having heart surgery at13 months and two different cranial surgeries before the age of four.
- June 26, 2017: The NBA debuts its first ever NBA Awards show ceremony on TNT with rapper Drake hosting the event this year. It notes some of the major winners of honors for the NBA as a replacement for the inconsistent patterns that some awards were given out beforehand. Both Devin Booker and rookie Tyler Ulis were named nominees for awards on the best overall performance (with that 70 point game against the Boston Celtics on the road) and the best buzzer-beating shot (with the game-winner the Suns had at home against, coincidentally enough, the Boston Celtics); Marquese Chriss would be the only winner for the Suns that night, as he was officially announced as a member of the NBA All-Rookie Second Team, being the first Suns player since Joe Johnson to make it to that particular Rookie Team.

== Offseason ==
=== Draft picks ===
Round	Pick	Player	Position(s)	Nationality(-ies)	College / Club
1	4	Dragan Bender	Forward/center	Bosnia and Herzegovina; Croatia	(Israel) Maccabi Tel Aviv
1	8	Marquese Chriss	Forward/center	United States	Washington
2	34	Tyler Ulis	Point Guard	United States	Kentucky

The Phoenix Suns would once again enter the draft with three first-round picks and one second-round pick this season, tying the 2013–14 season for the most first round selections the team has ever had. They own their first selection in the first round, which was at the original Pick 4 and is now the highest selection they'd ever have since 1987, while their second first-round pick (which was stuck in Pick 13 for the fourth time in six years) was had by the February 18, 2016 trade deadline with the Washington Wizards trading it away to them (similar to what happened in the 2014 NBA draft) along with the temporary additions of power forward/centers DeJuan Blair and Kris Humphries in exchange for removing Markieff Morris from the team due to his incessant demands of wanting out of the team after an earlier trade involving his twin brother, Marcus Morris, occurred on July 2, 2015. The Suns would be the only team this season to hold multiple NBA Draft lottery selections because of it. Not only that, but the Suns also got their third first round selection at Pick 28 from the newly defending champion Cleveland Cavaliers due to an earlier trade involving the Boston Celtics, where they got the Cleveland Cavaliers' first-round draft pick that Boston acquired in an earlier trade alongside the also-temporary addition of Marcus Thornton in exchange for Isaiah Thomas. The lone second-round pick they have is also the pick they had on their own accord in spite of having a continuously declining record (done in by injuries and other turmoil involving the team placed throughout last season, which included the aforementioned trade that Markieff Morris demanded during that season) in the process. The Suns had also initially planned to get the Minnesota Timberwolves' second round selection for this year (which would have been Rade Zagorac at Pick 35 this year), but traded it away in a different trade with the Boston Celtics (back when it was still considered to be a first-round draft pick) in order to get Brandan Wright on the team under the same season they first acquired Isaiah Thomas. Furthermore, there was still the projection that the Los Angeles Lakers' first-round pick that had belonged to the Suns before the 2014–15 season came and went originally planned to convey itself for the draft in 2016, but they ultimately did not due to lottery protections allowing the Lakers to keep their pick (which was Brandon Ingram at Pick 2) for another season.

With the fourth pick of the draft, Phoenix would select the Bosnian-born Croatian power forward/center Dragan Bender from Maccabi Tel Aviv in Israel. During his time with Maccabi Tel Aviv, Bender would hold many different averages due to playing in multiple European competitions the previous season. Most notably, Bender would average 5.4 points, 2.7 rebounds, 0.8 assists, 0.8 blocks, and 0.6 steals per game in Israel in 13.8 minutes of play off the bench during his second season with what was considered a star-studded team in Maccabi Tel Aviv, with him putting up 2.1 points, 1.4 rebounds, 0.6 assists, 0.4 blocks, and 0.3 steals per game in the Euroleague with 10.6 minutes of similar play off the bench. However, he'd also be an Israeli League Cup champion for his team in 2015, a two-time Israeli State Cup champion for his team, and he'd also be an Israeli All-Star in 2016. He would be signed with the Suns this season instead of becoming a draft-and-stash candidate for the team this season, thus becoming the newest, youngest draft player the Suns have ever taken in the draft, ahead of last year's first-round draft pick, Devin Booker. He'd also be the youngest Suns player in franchise history ahead of Maciej Lampe, a player that made his NBA debut with the Suns at around 18 years old himself, although Lampe was drafted at a much younger time during the 2003 NBA draft by the New York Knicks himself.

After the fourth selection came and went, the Suns would make a trade involving the Sacramento Kings where they'd trade their 13th and 28th selections (which would be Greek center Georgios Papagiannis at Pick 13 and a Haitian power forward/center from the University of Kentucky in Skal Labissière at Pick 28 respectively), the draft rights for Bogdan Bogdanović, and the 2020 second-round draft pick they acquired from the Detroit Pistons due to an earlier trade involving Marcus Morris and the Kings would select Marquese Chriss from the University of Washington for them with the eighth pick of the draft. During his only season at Washington, Chriss would average 13.8 points, 5.4 rebounds, 1.6 blocks, 0.9 steals, and 0.8 assists in 24.9 minutes of action, with him breaking the university's freshman record for the most blocks in their first season and being mentioned as an honorable mention for the All-Pac-12 Freshman Team. It would also be revealed later on that Phoenix was neck-and-neck between the two power forwards/centers before the trade, with Phoenix deciding to go for Dragan first due to the fact that he was more likely to be selected by a team like the Minnesota Timberwolves, the New Orleans Pelicans, or the Denver Nuggets instead of Sacramento if he fell than Marquese did, although the Suns figured either choice would have given them both power forwards with Jaylen Brown being selected by Boston at Pick 3 and the next three teams likely wanting players that were guards anyway.

Finally, with the thirty-fourth pick of the draft, the Suns selected Tyler Ulis from the University of Kentucky. In his two seasons with Kentucky (one of which being spent on the bench alongside Phoenix's 2015 first round selection Devin Booker), Ulis averaged 11.3 points, 5.3 assists, 2.4 rebounds, and 1.2 steals per game with the Wildcats, also being a part of the SEC All-Freshman Team for 2015 similar to Devin. However, his sophomore season would provide a major jump for Ulis, recording 17.3 points, 7 assists, 3 rebounds, and 1.5 steals per game for Kentucky, which resulted in many honors for him in his second and final season with the team, ranging from the SEC Tournament's MVP and All-SEC First Team to the SEC Player of the Year and the SEC Defensive Player of the Year (with him also being the second guy in the SEC behind Anthony Davis to earn those two honors in the same season) to even gaining major honors and awards with the Bob Cousy Award and being a part of the consensus All-American First Team for 2016. Another player that had declared for the 2016 NBA draft, but ultimately was not selected around the time was Derrick Jones Jr., an athletic freshman small forward from the University of Nevada, Las Vegas who only played for one season because of a controversy revolving around his ACT test score he had back in Baltimore, Maryland.

=== Free agency ===
Players Mirza Teletović, Jon Leuer, and Chase Budinger, as well as the returning Ronnie Price all became unrestricted free agents as of the end of the 2015–16 NBA season. In addition, both power forward/center Alan Williams and shooting guard John Jenkins also had player options that could potentially make themselves unrestricted free agents as well, so long as the team ended up declining their player options before September 1 and October 24 respectively. Furthermore, former starting small forward P. J. Tucker also has a player option for this season as well, but he would end up accepting his option before the free agency period began. With Alan Williams, he was considered very likely to have his contract guaranteed considering his All-NBA Summer League First Team worthy performance during his time in Las Vegas this season, according to a statement that general manager Ryan McDonough made about him on July 24, 2016. His deal would be made official, though, on September 1, 2016, when he did get his second year fully guaranteed by the Suns officially. Meanwhile, John Jenkins originally held his player option for the team to decide upon around July 11. However, both Jenkins and the Suns agreed to extend their option before the beginning of the regular season, which was mainly dependent on circumstances at hand involving not just Jenkins, but the team as well. At the end of the day, though, the Suns also decided to keep John Jenkins on October 24, 2016, despite not performing so well in the preseason due to not just potential trade purposes, but also the fact that his second and third years on his contract with the team were still non-guaranteed years for Jenkins (especially his third year, with his second year remaining non-guaranteed until the league-wide deadline on January 6, 2017), as well as his own shooting abilities he displayed during last season. The Suns also planned to convince their 27th pick from the 2014 NBA draft, Bogdan Bogdanović, to leave his current team in Fenerbahçe (Ülker) from Turkey to play in the NBA early before the salary he gets from the team rises exponentially next season due to him no longer being bound to the rookie-scale deal. However, it was later confirmed before the 2016 NBA draft began that Bogdan would end up staying with his current team in Turkey for at least one more season. In the end, though, that decision would get him traded to the Sacramento Kings alongside their 13th and 28th picks and the Detroit Pistons' 2020 second-round pick for the draft rights of power forward Marquese Chriss.

At the beginning of free agency, the Suns got back shooting guard/small forward Jared Dudley, a player who had previously played with Phoenix from 2008 to 2013 (including the team's last playoff run in 2010), on a 3-year deal worth $30 million. However, they'd also lose power forward Mirza Teletović to the Milwaukee Bucks earlier in the day, who was worth exactly the same amount as well. With that said, Dudley sees his second stint with the Suns as him being a stretch power forward instead. He also wants to help bring back the same sort of atmosphere the team held back in their 2009–10 season again. A day after that, the Suns would let their other power forward they had last season, Jon Leuer, leave on a 4-year deal worth $42 million for the Detroit Pistons. On July 6, it would be announced that another former Suns player from the Seven Seconds Or Less era of Suns teams would return with the Suns in combo guard Leandro Barbosa, a player who was with the team twice from 2003 to 2010 and 2014, coming back again (this time from the previously 2015 NBA Finals champion and 73–9 Golden State Warriors (with Golden State winning the 2017 NBA Finals in downright dominant fashion)) on a 2-year deal worth $8 million this time around. The signing would be official on July 19, which was over two weeks before he'd begin playing for the 2016 Summer Olympics in Rio de Janeiro for his home nation of Brazil. Six days later, it was announced that Ronnie Price would sign a 2-year deal worth $5 million with the Oklahoma City Thunder due to the combination of Phoenix re-signing Leandro Barbosa again and drafting Tyler Ulis in the second round, although Price's signing would not be official until August 13. Coach Earl Watson also hinted that Ronnie Price could also return to Phoenix (under the guise of an assistant head coach for the staff at the time) when the time is right for him to do that. Finally, Chase Budinger would sign a non-guaranteed deal to try his luck at signing an official, regular season deal with the Brooklyn Nets on September 21, 2016, although his signing would not be ready until five days later. However, he would ultimately be waived by the Nets about a month later on October 18, 2016. Almost a week afterwards, Ronnie Price would be waived by the Oklahoma City Thunder on October 24, 2016, despite the fact that his two-year deal with the Thunder was fully guaranteed. Chase Budinger would sign with the Saski Baskonia in Spain for the rest of the season on October 27, 2016, while Ronnie Price would not sign up with another team until January 27, 2017.

On August 20, 2016, the Suns were projected to sign a D-League affiliate point guard (who had previously played for the Bakersfield Jam before the location and team name change) named Askia Booker (who is not related to Devin Booker) to a non-guaranteed training camp deal after a strong enough performance he showcased for the team during the Summer League. However, instead of signing Askia Booker, the team would sign up former Nevada–Las Vegas Runnin' Rebels freshman small forward Derrick Jones Jr. to a deal on September 13, 2016, with the move almost feeling like a sign for the Suns before T. J. Warren officially announced his return to action, yet P. J. Tucker would announce he'd (likely) be out for the start of the regular season this time around. A day later, the Suns also signed 2014 second-round pick Alec Brown to a non-guaranteed deal as well. Furthermore, the team would also have the likes of Hapoel Holon forward Mike Moser and Tulsa Golden Hurricane guard Shaquille Harrison joined the training camp squad alongside both Alec Brown and Derrick Jones Jr. just another day later. Two days after that, though, the Suns decided to waive Alec Brown in order to retain his draft rights, although they would later on trade him and remove his draft rights via their new Northern Arizona Suns D-League affiliate squad on October 29, 2016, to a new D-League expansion squad known as the Windy City Bulls well over a month later. On September 25, 2016, instead of having the likes of Mike Moser joining Derrick Jones Jr. and Shaquille Harrison due to a health issue, the team would also include Olympique Antibes Sharks center Gracin Bakumanya (the only international underclassman that did not play in college to be undrafted this year) and D-League affiliate power forward Derek Cooke Jr. (who also had a satisfying enough performance in the Summer League) as their official training camp invitees. However, none of Shaquille Harrison, Gracin Bakumanya, nor Derek Cooke Jr. would play a single game for Phoenix in the preseason, as they would all be waived on October 10. The only invited player that did get some preseason action, Derrick Jones Jr. (who was an undrafted 19 year old small forward), not only wound up getting one of the last roster spots with the Suns, but he also took over a spot on the roster over the currently more established shooting guard in Archie Goodwin, who not only spent three full seasons with the team as it was, but also had guaranteed money over both Derrick Jones Jr. and John Jenkins to boot. It also meant that with Derrick Jones Jr. on the roster, the Suns would enter the season with four rookies on their roster after all, with four of their players also being teenagers to start out the regular season. It was later on confirmed that Archie Goodwin did request a trade out by the Phoenix Suns in a respectful manner before the end of the pre-season, but the team could not find a good deal for him on time. All three of the original, non-guaranteed deals that did not stay with the Phoenix Suns (as well as Askia Booker) would soon find themselves as a part of the nearby Northern Arizona Suns D-League affiliate team, while Archie Goodwin would sign a two-year deal with the New Orleans Pelicans on November 6, 2016, although he would only last until November 20 that same year before playing for the newly formed Greensboro Swarm D-League team ten days later until March 15, 2017, where he would sign a two-year deal for the Brooklyn Nets after signing two 10-day contracts with them.

On January 6, 2017, after agreeing to keep John Jenkins during the start of the season, the team officially announced that Jenkins would no longer be on the team anymore, and that his remaining two years on his deal (or rather, one and a half year due to his half-season with the Suns being guaranteed money by that point) would be fully waived off of their salary. This decision came after the notion that he only played four games this season (22 the previous one) and did not perform well at all during that time. It also held the purpose of opening up a roster spot for any possible trades the Suns could make between then and the trade deadline involving a veteran like P. J. Tucker. His contract that year would have been fully guaranteed otherwise had he stayed with the team after that point. On the other hand, the contract Derrick Jones Jr. signed would be fully guaranteed a day later himself due to his contract originally being non-guaranteed at the time. On January 27, 2017, it was announced that Ronnie Price would return with the Suns for his third stint with the squad (although due to him not playing official, regular season games for the Thunder or anyone else before that point, it's still technically considered a part of his second stint instead), as he would sign a 10-day contract with the team during that point. John Jenkins would sign up to play for the Westchester Knicks in the D-League on February 3, while Ronnie Price would sign a second 10-day contract three days later. Finally, on February 23, the Suns would trade away a Top-55 protected second-round pick in order to get themselves small forward Mike Scott (a player that Atlanta had acquired in Phoenix's 2010 sign-and-trade for Josh Childress), the draft rights to Turkish shooting guard Cenk Akyol, and $500,000 in cash considerations from the Atlanta Hawks, as well as trade fan-favorite small/power forward (and the last consistent remnant of the Lance Blanks era) P. J. Tucker to his original NBA team, the Toronto Raptors, for power forward/center Jared Sullinger, both their 2017 and 2018 second-round draft picks, and extra cash considerations worth $1,000,000 from them. However, neither Jared Sullinger nor Mike Scott would play for the Suns this season, with them both being waived for salary cap purposes and instead would allow Ronnie Price to sign a one-year contract to stay for the rest of the year as a player. The Suns would also provide Jarell Eddie two 10-day contracts on March 19, 2017, and March 29, 2017, before ultimately signing a D-League player from their own affiliate squad, Elijah Millsap of the Northern Arizona Suns, to a multi-year deal on April 9, 2017.

=== Coaching changes ===
The Suns had initially planned to start a coaching search after their previous season ended. Some of the candidates that were linked to the Suns at the time as potential new candidates included Luke Walton, Mike D'Antoni, Jay Wright, and Dan Majerle, just to name a few examples. However, because of overwhelmingly positive support from both the team's players and the front office alike (which included an improved performance throughout the last two months of the season, even with major injuries to Eric Bledsoe, T. J. Warren, and later Brandon Knight in mind), Earl Watson would earn his new three-year deal worth $7.5 million to become the full-time head coach for the Suns, effective as of April 19, 2016. During Earl's re-introduction conference as full-time head coach, fellow players (at the time) Devin Booker, Brandon Knight, Mirza Teletović, and Ronnie Price all showed up to the event in support of the move, with the rest of the roster (at that time) also expressing profound support of it. On May 5, 2016 (exactly the same day Senior Adviser Lon Babby resigned from his duties with the team), three assistant coaches the team had throughout last season in former Phoenix Mercury head coach Corey Gaines, replacement assistant coach Bob Hill, and player development assistant coach Irving Roland would not have their contracts renewed after the season the team had last season, with Chris Darnell taking up the absent player development role led by Irving until further notice. That left with only assistant coach Nate Bjorkgren and player development coach Jason Fraser as the only assistant coaches/player development coaches left from last season's debacle. Watson later told people that the assistant coaches he's got that he wants them to join him by sitting next to him or moving on to lead their own program somewhere else later on down the line.

On May 18, a day after the 2016 NBA Draft Lottery ended with everyone remaining exactly where they were at all this time, the Suns hired the Canadian Portland Trail Blazers' assistant coach Jay Triano into being the team's official associate head coach for Earl Watson on a three-year deal of his own. On June 25, two days after the 2016 NBA draft ended, the Phoenix Suns announced that one of its former players, Tyrone Corbin, would be a new assistant coach for Earl Watson's staff. During the 2016 NBA Summer League, it was announced that both Bret Burchard and Scott Vaughan would be assistant head coaches for the Suns throughout the event. On July 7, 2016, the Suns would add an old college assistant coach named Scott Duncan to their team as a player development assistant. Duncan was previously an assistant coach for various Division I campuses in the NCAA since 1978, ranging from coach Watson's campus at UCLA and Oregon to Clemson and Washington State, with Northern Illinois, Fresno State, New Mexico, and Cleveland State all holding him around at one point or another, with his most recent tenure being a part of the University of Montana as an associate head coach for six straight seasons. Later on that month, on July 27, it was announced that the Suns would be close to completing their coaching staff by having a former college teammate of Steve Nash, as well as a former NBA player and video coordinator and player development coach for the San Antonio Spurs named Marlon Garnett join the team as both an assistant head coach and a player development coach similar to what current assistant head coach Nate Bjorkgren held last year under former head coach Jeff Hornacek before the first coaching shake-up of last season left Nate exclusively as an assistant coach only. Finally, on September 13, it was announced that the team had a last-minute addition to their player development staff with former 2004 NBA Finals champion and All-Star Mehmet Okur joining the team as an official player development coach, thus becoming the first Turkish born citizen to enter an NBA coaching staff in some way. It was a move to bring some extra help for the Suns' young big men, especially the Suns' first round rookies this season in Dragan Bender and Marquese Chriss. More specifically, it was done to have the players learn how to do moves in the post and utilize those moves properly. Both Triano and Okur would mark the first time a team had two or more foreign born coaches being a part of the same NBA coaching staff, although it would not mark the first time the team had an international coach altogether.

=== Front office changes ===
Two weeks after announcing that Earl Watson would be the full-time coach of the Suns, former president of basketball operations and senior adviser Lon Babby announced his resignation from his duties with the team after his six-year tenure with the Suns. At the same time, assistant video coordinator Ross Geiger did not get his contract renewed. On July 27, 2016, it was announced that in addition to retaining Chris Darnell as their head video coordinator, the Suns got former Long Beach State University, St. John's University, California State Fullerton University, and Los Angeles Clippers video coordinator Jason Tilton and former video coordinator for the San Antonio Spurs and Team U.S.A., as well as video intern for last season's 73–9 Golden State Warriors Julian Mills as the team's newest assistant video coordinators with former Campbell University, Southeastern Louisiana University, North Carolina University, and Michigan State University athletic trainer Quinton Sawyer joining as the team's assistant athletic trainer and sports science coordinator. Then, on September 13, 2016, alongside the new addition of former NBA Finals champion and All-Star Mehmet Okur to the coaching staff for a player development role, it was announced that former Minnesota Timberwolves, Washington Wizards, and Detroit Pistons scout Jason Hervey (not to be confused with the actor) would join the Suns as an advanced scout.

== Roster ==
2016–17 Phoenix Suns roster
Players

Pos.	No.	Player	Height	Weight	DOB	From
PG	19	Leandro Barbosa (I)	6 ft 3 in (1.91 m)	194 lb (88 kg)	1982–11–28	Brazil
C	35	Dragan Bender (R)	7 ft 1 in (2.16 m)	225 lb (102 kg)	1997–11–17	Croatia
PG	2	Eric Bledsoe (I)	6 ft 1 in (1.85 m)	190 lb (86 kg)	1989–12–09	Kentucky
SG	1	Devin Booker	6 ft 6 in (1.98 m)	206 lb (93 kg)	1996–10–30	Kentucky
C	4	Tyson Chandler (I)	7 ft 1 in (2.16 m)	240 lb (109 kg)	1982–10–02	Dominguez HS (CA)
PF	0	Marquese Chriss (R)	6 ft 10 in (2.08 m)	233 lb (106 kg)	1997–07–02	Washington
SF	3	Jared Dudley (I)	6 ft 7 in (2.01 m)	225 lb (102 kg)	1985–07–10	Boston College
SG	10	Derrick Jones Jr. (R)	6 ft 7 in (2.01 m)	190 lb (86 kg)	1997–02–15	UNLV
PG	11	Brandon Knight (I)	6 ft 3 in (1.91 m)	189 lb (86 kg)	1991–12–02	Kentucky
C	21	Alex Len	7 ft 1 in (2.16 m)	260 lb (118 kg)	1993–06–16	Maryland
SG	22	Elijah Millsap	6 ft 7 in (2.01 m)	215 lb (98 kg)	1987–08–12	UAB
PG	14	Ronnie Price	6 ft 2 in (1.88 m)	190 lb (86 kg)	1983–06–21	Utah Valley
PG	8	Tyler Ulis (R)	5 ft 10 in (1.78 m)	150 lb (68 kg)	1996–01–05	Kentucky
SF	12	T. J. Warren	6 ft 8 in (2.03 m)	230 lb (104 kg)	1993–09–05	NC State
PF	15	Alan Williams	6 ft 8 in (2.03 m)	260 lb (118 kg)	1993–01–28	UC Santa Barbara

Coaches
Head coach
- Earl Watson
Assistant(s)
- Jay Triano (associate head coach)
- Nate Bjorkgren
- Tyrone Corbin
- Marlon Garnett (assistant/player development)
- Scott Duncan (player development)
- Jason Fraser (player development)
- Mehmet Okur (player development)

Legend
- (DP) Unsigned draft pick
- (FA) Free agent
- (S) Suspended
- (I) Inactive
- (DL) On assignment to D-League affiliate
- Injured

Roster

=== Salaries ===
Player	2016–17 Salary
Eric Bledsoe	$14,000,000
Brandon Knight	$12,606,250
Tyson Chandler	$12,415,000
Jared Dudley	$10,470,000
Oleksiy "Alex" Len	$4,823,621
Dragan Bender	$4,276,320
Leandro Barbosa	$4,000,000
Marquese Chriss	$2,941,440
Devin Booker	$2,148,360
T. J. Warren	$2,128,920
Tyler Ulis	$918,369
Alan Williams	$874,636
Ronnie Price	$693,682
Derrick Jones Jr.	$543,471
Elijah Millsap	$23,069
Total	$77,140,018

Once again, the Suns would be forced to pay the remaining salary they originally had left for Michael Beasley under this season due to the buyout the Suns did on September 3, 2013, which was $777,778. However, this would actually be done as the team's official last year for payment for him since, similar to the amnesty of Josh Childress beforehand, they would no longer have to pay him again after his value is fully paid off. Not only that, but former Suns player Kris Humphries would have the salary of his previous contract he had during his short stint there be paid out throughout this season (which would total out to $4,630,000) due to the stipulations of him being waived on February 27, 2016. Furthermore, the Suns would wind up releasing Archie Goodwin before the start of this season, which means that currently, the Suns will also pay Archie Goodwin the rest of his salary this season (which was around $2,094,089) to essentially not play for them anymore. The Suns would also pay out half of John Jenkins' salary that they had throughout his time with the team (which would be half of $1,050,961), but the rest for the next year and the half they would have paid out for Jenkins after January 6, 2017, would no longer be paid out to him from here on out. Not only that, but by waiving the contracts of both Jared Sullinger and Mike Scott (who both have deals reaching $5,628,000 and $3,333,334 respectively that expire after the end of this season), as well as gain an extra $1,500,000 received from both of those respective deals at hand ($1,000,000 of which came from Toronto, while $500,000 would come from Atlanta), the Suns would have enough money to reach the minimum salary cap space needed to satisfy the NBA salary floor after signing Ronnie Price for the rest of the season at a grand total of $693,682 on February 23, 2017.

== Pre-season ==
For the second straight season, the Suns would start out their season by having six pre-season games to play under before the regular season began. This time around, they'd start the preseason really early, only to have their biggest gap come for an entire week between their last home game of the preseason in Arizona against Dallas and the last official home game out in Anaheim against the L.A. Lakers. The reality is this season is the first season where a new system decided how the schedule will be done for every team in the league, and due to the new Collective Bargaining Agreement, that was updated in 2017, the preseason will be shortened in 2017. The Suns would also be the first opponent of the San Antonio Spurs without Tim Duncan, who retired after the 2016 season, since he arrived in 1997. They would beat the Spurs by a score of 91–86 with their starting line-up being Eric Bledsoe, Devin Booker, T. J. Warren, Jared Dudley, and Tyson Chandler, which would also be their starting lineup for the start of the regular season. However, the Suns would lose two straight close games before staging their biggest comeback in pre-season history, coming back from a 30-point deficit to beat the Utah Jazz with the final score of 111–110 with a few key slam dunks late in the fourth quarter by Archie Goodwin to close out the game. Ultimately, the Suns would end their preseason with a 4–2 record with a three-game winning streak to end the preseason, with none of their games ending with a greater margin than 5 points.

2016 pre-season game log
Total: 4–2 (Home: 2–1; Road: 2–1)
Pre-season: 4–2 (home: 2–1; road: 2–1)

Game	Date	Team	Score	High points	High rebounds	High assists	Location Attendance	Record
1	October 3	San Antonio	W 91–86	Devin Booker (19)	Tyson Chandler (8)	Eric Bledsoe (4)	Talking Stick Resort Arena; 8,076	1–0
2	October 5	Utah	L 99–104	Brandon Knight (17)	Marquese Chriss, Alan Williams (8)	Eric Bledsoe (4)	Talking Stick Resort Arena; 8,407	1–1
3	October 7	@ Portland	L 110–115	Devin Booker (34)	Marquese Chriss, T. J. Warren (8)	Eric Bledsoe (7)	Moda Center; 19,441	1–2
4	October 12	@ Utah	W 111–110	Devin Booker (20)	Eric Bledsoe, Alex Len, Alan Williams (7)	Eric Bledsoe, Devin Booker, Jared Dudley, Tyler Ulis (3)	Vivint Smart Home Arena; 16,521	2–2
5	October 14	Dallas	W 112–107	Eric Bledsoe, Marquese Chriss (17)	Alan Williams (9)	Eric Bledsoe (7)	Talking Stick Resort Arena; 12,209	3–2
6	October 21	@ L.A. Lakers	W 98–94	Alex Len (16)	Tyson Chandler (11)	Brandon Knight (5)	Honda Center (Anaheim); 13,489	4–2

2016–17 season schedule

== Regular season ==
=== Division ===
Pacific Division	W	L	PCT	GB	Home	Road	Div	GP
z – Golden State Warriors	67	15	.817	–	36‍–‍5	31‍–‍10	14–2	82
x – Los Angeles Clippers	51	31	.622	16.0	29‍–‍12	22‍–‍19	10–6	82
e – Sacramento Kings	32	50	.390	35.0	17‍–‍24	15‍–‍26	7–9	82
e – Los Angeles Lakers	26	56	.317	41.0	17‍–‍24	9‍–‍32	6–10	82
e – Phoenix Suns	24	58	.293	43.0	15‍–‍26	9‍–‍32	3–13	82

=== Conference ===
Western Conference
#	Team	W	L	PCT	GB	GP
1	z – Golden State Warriors *	67	15	.817	–	82
2	y – San Antonio Spurs *	61	21	.744	6.0	82
3	x – Houston Rockets	55	27	.671	12.0	82
4	x – Los Angeles Clippers	51	31	.622	16.0	82
5	y – Utah Jazz *	51	31	.622	16.0	82
6	x – Oklahoma City Thunder	47	35	.573	20.0	82
7	x – Memphis Grizzlies	43	39	.524	24.0	82
8	x – Portland Trail Blazers	41	41	.500	26.0	82
9	e – Denver Nuggets	40	42	.488	27.0	82
10	e – New Orleans Pelicans	34	48	.415	33.0	82
11	e – Dallas Mavericks	33	49	.402	34.0	82
12	e – Sacramento Kings	32	50	.390	35.0	82
13	e – Minnesota Timberwolves	31	51	.378	36.0	82
14	e – Los Angeles Lakers	26	56	.317	41.0	82
15	e – Phoenix Suns	24	58	.293	43.0	82

=== Game log ===
2016–17 game log
Total: 24–58 (Home: 15–26; Road: 9–32)
October: 0–4 (home: 0–2; road: 0–2)

Game	Date	Team	Score	High points	High rebounds	High assists	Location Attendance	Record
1	October 26	Sacramento	L 94–113	Devin Booker (18)	Tyson Chandler (10)	Eric Bledsoe (5)	Talking Stick Resort Arena; 18,055	0–1
2	October 28	@ Oklahoma City	L 110–113 (OT)	T. J. Warren (30)	Tyson Chandler (10)	Eric Bledsoe (6)	Chesapeake Energy Arena; 18,203	0–2
3	October 30	Golden State	L 100–106	T. J. Warren (26)	Tyson Chandler (18)	Eric Bledsoe (6)	Talking Stick Resort Arena; 17,011	0–3
4	October 31	@ L.A. Clippers	L 98–116	Brandon Knight (18)	Eric Bledsoe (8)	Eric Bledsoe (5)	Staples Center; 19,060	0–4

November : 6–9 (home: 3–3; road: 3–6)

Game	Date	Team	Score	High points	High rebounds	High assists	Location Attendance	Record
5	November 2	Portland	W 118–115 (OT)	T. J. Warren (27)	Tyson Chandler (18)	Eric Bledsoe (4)	Talking Stick Resort Arena; 17,284	1–4
6	November 4	@ New Orleans	W 112–111 (OT)	Devin Booker (38)	Tyson Chandler (18)	Eric Bledsoe (4)	Smoothie King Center; 15,379	2–4
7	November 6	@ L.A. Lakers	L 108–119	Devin Booker (39)	Tyson Chandler (12)	Devin Booker (7)	Staples Center; 18,997	2–5
8	November 8	@ Portland	L 121–124	Eric Bledsoe (31)	Alex Len, P. J. Tucker (9)	Brandon Knight (6)	Moda Center; 19,239	2–6
9	November 9	Detroit	W 107–100	Eric Bledsoe (21)	Alex Len (14)	Eric Bledsoe (8)	Talking Stick Resort Arena; 16,719	3–6
10	November 12	Brooklyn	L 104–122	T. J. Warren (18)	Alex Len (11)	Eric Bledsoe (8)	Talking Stick Resort Arena; 17,126	3–7
11	November 13	@ Golden State	L 120–133	Eric Bledsoe, T. J. Warren (18)	P. J. Tucker (8)	Eric Bledsoe, Jared Dudley (5)	Oracle Arena; 19,596	3–8
12	November 16	@ Denver	L 104–120	Brandon Knight (32)	P. J. Tucker (8)	Eric Bledsoe (5)	Pepsi Center; 10,247	3–9
13	November 18	@ Indiana	W 116–96	Brandon Knight (17)	Alan Williams (15)	Jared Dudley (6)	Bankers Life Fieldhouse; 16,780	4–9
14	November 19	@ Philadelphia	L 105–120	Eric Bledsoe (27)	Alan Williams (11)	Eric Bledsoe (6)	Wells Fargo Center; 18,125	4–10
15	November 21	@ Washington	L 101–106	Devin Booker (30)	Alex Len (10)	Eric Bledsoe (6)	Verizon Center; 12,790	4–11
16	November 23	@ Orlando	W 92–87	Alex Len (17)	Alex Len (12)	Eric Bledsoe (5)	Amway Center; 17,069	5–11
17	November 25	Minnesota	L 85–98	Eric Bledsoe (23)	Alex Len (11)	Eric Bledsoe (10)	Talking Stick Resort Arena; 16,728	5–12
18	November 27	Denver	L 114–120	Eric Bledsoe (35)	Tyson Chandler (15)	Eric Bledsoe (6)	Talking Stick Resort Arena; 15,365	5–13
19	November 30	Atlanta	W 109–107	Brandon Knight (23)	Alex Len, Tyson Chandler (9)	Eric Bledsoe, Devin Booker (4)	Talking Stick Resort Arena; 15,909	6–13

December : 4–11 (home: 3–4; road: 1–7)

Game	Date	Team	Score	High points	High rebounds	High assists	Location Attendance	Record
20	December 3	@ Golden State	L 109–138	Eric Bledsoe (27)	Tyson Chandler (9)	Devin Booker (5)	Oracle Arena; 19,596	6–14
21	December 6	@ Utah	L 105–112	Devin Booker (21)	Brandon Knight, Jared Dudley (7)	Brandon Knight (5)	Vivint Smart Home Arena; 18,997	6–15
22	December 7	Indiana	L 94–109	Eric Bledsoe (15)	Tyson Chandler (10)	Devin Booker (5)	Talking Stick Resort Arena; 17,452	6–16
23	December 9	@ L.A. Lakers	W 119–115	Eric Bledsoe (30)	Alex Len (13)	Eric Bledsoe (9)	Staples Center; 18,997	7–16
24	December 11	New Orleans	L 119–120 (OT)	Eric Bledsoe (32)	Tyson Chandler (21)	Eric Bledsoe (8)	Talking Stick Resort Arena; 16,949	7–17
25	December 13	New York	W 113–111 (OT)	Eric Bledsoe (31)	Tyson Chandler (23)	Eric Bledsoe (8)	Talking Stick Resort Arena; 16,429	8–17
26	December 15	San Antonio	L 92–107	Devin Booker (17)	Tyson Chandler (8)	Eric Bledsoe, Devin Booker (5)	Talking Stick Resort Arena; 17,165	8–18
27	December 17	@ Oklahoma City	L 101–114	Devin Booker (31)	Tyson Chandler (9)	Devin Booker (5)	Chesapeake Energy Arena; 18,203	8–19
28	December 19	@ Minnesota	L 108–115	Eric Bledsoe (27)	Tyson Chandler (12)	Brandon Knight (4)	Target Center; 12,008	8–20
29	December 21	Houston	L 111–125	Devin Booker (28)	Tyson Chandler, Devin Booker, P. J. Tucker (6)	Devin Booker (7)	Talking Stick Resort Arena; 18,055	8–21
30	December 23	Philadelphia	W 123–116	Eric Bledsoe (24)	Tyson Chandler (12)	Eric Bledsoe (11)	Talking Stick Resort Arena; 16,535	9–21
31	December 26	@ Houston	L 115–131	Eric Bledsoe (24)	Dragan Bender (13)	Eric Bledsoe, Devin Booker (4)	Toyota Center; 18,055	9–22
32	December 28	@ San Antonio	L 98–119	T. J. Warren (23)	Tyson Chandler (7)	Brandon Knight (5)	AT&T Center; 18,418	9–23
33	December 29	Toronto	W 99–91	Eric Bledsoe (22)	Tyson Chandler (13)	Eric Bledsoe (10)	Talking Stick Resort Arena; 18,055	10–23
34	December 31	@ Utah	L 86–91	Devin Booker (20)	Tyson Chandler (11)	Eric Bledsoe (8)	Vivint Smart Home Arena; 19,911	10–24

January : 5–9 (home: 2–6; road: 3–3)

Game	Date	Team	Score	High points	High rebounds	High assists	Location Attendance	Record
35	January 2	@ L.A. Clippers	L 98–109	T. J. Warren (24)	P. J. Tucker (12)	Eric Bledsoe (9)	Staples Center; 19,060	10–25
36	January 3	Miami	W 99–90	Devin Booker (27)	Tyson Chandler (20)	Eric Bledsoe (7)	Talking Stick Resort Arena; 16,772	11–25
37	January 5	@ Dallas	W 102–95	Eric Bledsoe (26)	Tyson Chandler (18)	Eric Bledsoe (7)	American Airlines Center; 19,570	12–25
38	January 8	Cleveland	L 116–120	Eric Bledsoe (31)	Tyson Chandler (15)	Eric Bledsoe (8)	Talking Stick Resort Arena; 18,055	12–26
39	January 12	Dallas	L 108–113	Devin Booker (39)	Tyson Chandler (19)	Eric Bledsoe (5)	Mexico City Arena (Mexico City); 19,874	12–27
40	January 14	San Antonio	W 108–105	Devin Booker (39)	Tyson Chandler (15)	Eric Bledsoe (10)	Mexico City Arena (Mexico City); 20,532	13–27
41	January 16	Utah	L 101–106	Eric Bledsoe (31)	P. J. Tucker (13)	Eric Bledsoe (9)	Talking Stick Resort Arena; 16,767	13–28
42	January 19	@ Cleveland	L 103–118	Eric Bledsoe, Tyson Chandler (22)	Tyson Chandler (16)	Eric Bledsoe (9)	Quicken Loans Arena; 20,562	13–29
43	January 21	@ New York	W 107–105	Devin Booker (26)	Tyson Chandler (16)	Eric Bledsoe (7)	Madison Square Garden; 19,812	14–29
44	January 22	@ Toronto	W 115–103	Eric Bledsoe (40)	Alex Len, P. J. Tucker (10)	Eric Bledsoe (13)	Air Canada Centre; 19,800	15–29
45	January 24	Minnesota	L 111–112	Devin Booker (26)	Tyson Chandler (17)	Eric Bledsoe (7)	Talking Stick Resort Arena; 17,241	15–30
46	January 26	@ Denver	L 120–127	Eric Bledsoe (28)	T. J. Warren (8)	Devin Booker (6)	Pepsi Center; 12,231	15–31
47	January 28	Denver	L 112–123	Eric Bledsoe (41)	Tyson Chandler (13)	Eric Bledsoe (8)	Talking Stick Resort Arena; 18,055	15–32
48	January 30	Memphis	L 96–115	Devin Booker (22)	Alex Len (7)	Eric Bledsoe (4)	Talking Stick Resort Arena; 16,332	15–33

February : 3–9 (home: 2–3; road: 1–6)

Game	Date	Team	Score	High points	High rebounds	High assists	Location Attendance	Record
49	February 1	L.A. Clippers	L 114–124	Eric Bledsoe (41)	P. J. Tucker (12)	Eric Bledsoe (8)	Talking Stick Resort Arena; 16,191	15–34
50	February 3	@ Sacramento	W 105–103	Devin Booker (33)	Tyson Chandler (12)	Eric Bledsoe (4)	Golden 1 Center; 17,608	16–34
51	February 4	Milwaukee	L 112–137	Devin Booker (31)	Tyson Chandler (13)	Eric Bledsoe (6)	Talking Stick Resort Arena; 17,192	16–35
52	February 6	@ New Orleans	L 106–111	T. J. Warren (20)	Tyson Chandler (12)	Brandon Knight (6)	Smoothie King Center; 15,888	16–36
53	February 8	@ Memphis	L 91–110	Devin Booker (20)	Tyson Chandler, P. J. Tucker (10)	Eric Bledsoe, Devin Booker, Jared Dudley (3)	FedExForum; 18,044	16–37
54	February 10	Chicago	W 115–97	Devin Booker (27)	Alan Williams (11)	Eric Bledsoe (8)	Talking Stick Resort Arena; 18,422	17–37
55	February 11	@ Houston	L 102–133	Devin Booker (18)	Alex Len (8)	Tyler Ulis (6)	Toyota Center; 18,055	17–38
56	February 13	New Orleans	L 108–110	Eric Bledsoe (37)	P. J. Tucker (16)	Eric Bledsoe (5)	Talking Stick Resort Arena; 16,321	17–39
57	February 15	L.A. Lakers	W 137–101	Eric Bledsoe (25)	Eric Bledsoe (10)	Eric Bledsoe (13)	Talking Stick Resort Arena; 18,055	18–39
All-Star Break
58	February 24	@ Chicago	L 121–128 (OT)	Devin Booker (27)	T. J. Warren (8)	Eric Bledsoe (10)	United Center; 21,641	18–40
59	February 26	@ Milwaukee	L 96–100	T. J. Warren (23)	Alan Williams (15)	Eric Bledsoe (9)	BMO Harris Bradley Center; 16,051	18–41
60	February 28	@ Memphis	L 112–130	Eric Bledsoe (20)	T. J. Warren, Marquese Chriss (6)	Eric Bledsoe (8)	FedExForum; 15,871	18–42

March : 4–12 (home: 3–6; road: 1–6)

Game	Date	Team	Score	High points	High rebounds	High assists	Location Attendance	Record
61	March 2	Charlotte	W 120–103	Marquese Chriss (17)	Alan Williams (12)	Devin Booker (9)	Talking Stick Resort Arena; 16,572	19–42
62	March 3	Oklahoma City	W 118–111	Eric Bledsoe (18)	Alan Williams (13)	Tyler Ulis (7)	Talking Stick Resort Arena; 18,055	20–42
63	March 5	Boston	W 109–106	Eric Bledsoe (28)	Alan Williams (15)	Eric Bledsoe (9)	Talking Stick Resort Arena; 16,790	21–42
64	March 7	Washington	L 127–131	Eric Bledsoe (30)	Alex Len (11)	Devin Booker (6)	Talking Stick Resort Arena; 16,372	21–43
65	March 9	L.A. Lakers	L 110–122	Devin Booker (23)	T. J. Warren (13)	Eric Bledsoe (5)	Talking Stick Resort Arena; 17,552	21–44
66	March 11	@ Dallas	W 100–98	Devin Booker (36)	Marquese Chriss, T. J. Warren (8)	Eric Bledsoe (6)	American Airlines Center; 20,324	22–44
67	March 12	Portland	L 101–110	Devin Booker (28)	Alan Williams (10)	Tyler Ulis (6)	Talking Stick Resort Arena; 16,664	22–45
68	March 15	Sacramento	L 101–107	T. J. Warren (24)	Alan Williams (11)	Tyler Ulis (13)	Talking Stick Resort Arena; 17,196	22–46
69	March 17	Orlando	L 103–109	T. J. Warren (26)	Alex Len (10)	Tyler Ulis (8)	Talking Stick Resort Arena; 16,880	22–47
70	March 19	@ Detroit	L 95–112	Tyler Ulis (17)	Alan Williams (12)	Tyler Ulis (11)	Palace of Auburn Hills; 19,588	22–48
71	March 21	@ Miami	L 97–114	Marquese Chriss (24)	Alex Len (11)	Tyler Ulis (6)	AmericanAirlines Arena; 19,600	22–49
72	March 23	@ Brooklyn	L 98–126	Devin Booker (28)	Marquese Chriss, Alex Len (11)	Tyler Ulis (12)	Barclays Center; 15,141	22–50
73	March 24	@ Boston	L 120–130	Devin Booker (70)	Alan Williams (14)	Jared Dudley (10)	TD Garden; 18,624	22–51
74	March 26	@ Charlotte	L 106–120	Devin Booker (23)	Alan Williams (11)	Tyler Ulis (9)	Spectrum Center; 17,292	22–52
75	March 28	@ Atlanta	L 91–95	T. J. Warren (24)	Jared Dudley, T. J. Warren, Alan Williams (8)	Tyler Ulis (10)	Philips Arena; 13,412	22–53
76	March 30	L.A. Clippers	L 118–124	Devin Booker (33)	T. J. Warren (10)	Tyler Ulis (13)	Talking Stick Resort Arena; 16,736	22–54

April : 2–4 (home: 2–2; road: 0–2)

Game	Date	Team	Score	High points	High rebounds	High assists	Location Attendance	Record
77	April 1	@ Portland	L 117–130	Devin Booker (31)	Marquese Chriss (13)	Devin Booker (7)	Moda Center; 18,915	22–55
78	April 2	Houston	L 116–123	Tyler Ulis (34)	Alex Len (12)	Devin Booker, Tyler Ulis (9)	Talking Stick Resort Arena; 17,378	22–56
79	April 5	Golden State	L 111–120	Devin Booker (21)	Alan Williams (17)	Tyler Ulis (6)	Talking Stick Resort Arena; 18,055	22–57
80	April 7	Oklahoma City	W 120–99	Devin Booker (37)	T. J. Warren (16)	Tyler Ulis (5)	Talking Stick Resort Arena; 18,055	23–57
81	April 9	Dallas	W 124–111	Devin Booker, T. J. Warren (21)	Alex Len (10)	Tyler Ulis (10)	Talking Stick Resort Arena; 18,055	24–57
82	April 11	@ Sacramento	L 104–129	Tyler Ulis (27)	Alan Williams (11)	Tyler Ulis (6)	Golden 1 Center; 17,608	24–58

2016–17 season schedule

== Player statistics ==
Legend
GP	Games played	GS	Games started	MPG	Minutes per game
FG%	Field-goal percentage	3P%	3-point field-goal percentage	FT%	Free-throw percentage
RPG	Rebounds per game	APG	Assists per game	SPG	Steals per game
BPG	Blocks per game	PPG	Points per game

Player	GP	GS	MPG	FG%	3P%	FT%	RPG	APG	SPG	BPG	PPG
Leandro Barbosa	67	0	14.4	.439	.357	.889	1.6	1.2	0.5	0.1	6.3
Dragan Bender	43	0	13.3	.354	.277	.364	2.4	0.5	0.2	0.5	3.4
Eric Bledsoe	66	66	33.0	.434	.335	.847	4.8	6.3	1.4	0.5	21.1
Devin Booker	78	78	35.0	.423	.363	.832	3.2	3.4	0.9	0.3	22.1
Tyson Chandler	47	46	27.6	.671	.000	.734	11.5	0.6	0.7	0.5	8.4
Marquese Chriss	82	75	21.3	.449	.321	.624	4.2	0.7	0.8	0.9	9.2
Jared Dudley	64	7	21.3	.454	.379	.662	3.5	1.9	0.7	0.3	6.8
Jarell Eddie*	5	0	12.4	.316	.250	.889	1.4	0.0	0.2	0.0	4.8
John Jenkins*	4	0	3.3	.400	.500	.800	0.3	0.3	0.0	0.0	1.8
Derrick Jones Jr.	32	8	17.0	.562	.273	.707	2.5	0.4	0.4	0.4	5.3
Brandon Knight*	54	5	21.1	.398	.324	.857	2.2	2.4	0.5	0.1	11.0
Oleksiy "Alex" Len	77	34	20.3	.497	.250	.721	6.6	0.6	0.5	1.3	8.0
Elijah Millsap*	2	0	11.5	.143	.000	.500	3.0	0.5	0.0	0.0	1.5
Ronnie Price	14	0	9.6	.167	.176	.750	0.8	1.3	1.2	0.2	1.0
P. J. Tucker*	57	17	28.5	.415	.338	.792	6.0	1.3	0.8	0.1	7.0
Tyler Ulis	61	15	18.4	.421	.266	.775	1.6	3.7	0.8	0.1	7.3
T. J. Warren	66	59	31.0	.495	.263	.773	5.1	1.1	1.2	0.6	14.4
Alan Williams	47	0	15.1	.517	.000	.625	6.2	0.5	0.6	0.7	7.4

* – Stats with the Suns

== Awards and records ==
=== Awards ===
- Rookie point guard Tyler Ulis and center/power forward Alan Williams would both earn All-NBA Las Vegas Summer League Second Team and All-NBA Las Vegas Summer League First Team honors respectively for their overall performances during the 2016 NBA Summer League.
- Before the start of the season opener against the Sacramento Kings, it was announced by owner Robert Sarver that legendary sports announcer Al McCoy will be entering the Phoenix Suns Ring of Honor on March 3, 2017, against the Oklahoma City Thunder.
  - On the night of the induction, unlike what happened with former coach John MacLeod five seasons ago, the Suns would pull off a surprise 118–111 upset victory over a triple-double machine in Russell Westbrook and the Oklahoma City Thunder. He also noted that "as long as he's going to continue to be accepted with the Suns and God smiles forward on him, he'll keep on going" as the Voice of The Suns.
- On April 4, 2017, Devin Booker's jersey was sent to the Naismith Memorial Basketball Hall of Fame to commemorate his legendary 70-point performance on March 24 against the Boston Celtics, being the youngest player in NBA history to record not just 60 points in a game, but 70 points at the age of 20 years old.
- Marquese Chriss was named as a member of the NBA All-Rookie Second Team for having one of the best performances for a rookie this season on June 26, 2017. He got in with 91 votes and became the first Suns rookie since Joe Johnson to be named a member of that squad.

=== All-Star ===
- Both Devin Booker and rookie Marquese Chriss would be named to the Rising Stars Challenge as members of Team U.S.A. As a result, Chriss not only marked the first time a Suns rookie got representation without being a replacement player of some sort in the event since Markieff Morris back in 2012, but Booker also became the first sophomore to play in the event without being a replacement player as well since Amar'e Stoudemire back in 2004. Furthermore, with Devin Booker also playing in last season's Rising Stars Challenge, he became the first Suns player to have back-to-back representation for the event since Amar'e Stoudemire back in 2003 and 2004, back when it was still named the Rookie Challenge. It would also be the first time the Suns had two participants at the same time in this event since 1995 back when the event was still known as the Rookie Challenge, with rookies Wesley Person and Trevor Ruffin competing in the event for the White Team that year under Cotton Fitzsimmons.
  - Devin Booker would record only 17 points and 6 assists for Team U.S.A., while Marquese Chriss would only record 7 points as Team U.S.A. would lose 150–141 to the World Team.
- Devin Booker would later compete in the NBA's Talent Challenge portion on Saturday. He would earn second place in the event behind Victor Oladipo of the Oklahoma City Thunder.
- Devin Booker would also be competing in the Taco Bell Skills Challenge to go alongside his appearance in the Rising Stars Challenge and the NBA Talent Challenge.
  - Booker would lose in the first round to former Suns player Isaiah Thomas, who wound up losing to Gordon Hayward in the semi-final round before ultimately losing out to 7'3" center Kristaps Porziņģis in the final round.
- Despite Derrick Jones Jr. playing more in the D-League with the Northern Arizona Suns affiliate squad at the time instead (and only getting three slam dunks in the NBA before the event began on February 15 against the Los Angeles Lakers), he would accept an invite to the NBA Slam Dunk Contest this year.
  - While Derrick Jones Jr. would make it to the final round, he would ultimately lose the contest to surprise winner Glenn Robinson III, the son of former #1 pick Glenn Robinson, mainly due to missing one of his dunks in the final round.

==== Week/Month ====
- Devin Booker would be named a Player of The Week candidate for the Western Conference from January 9–15, 2017 due to him averaging 35.3 points (including the two back-to-back 39 point game performances in Mexico City), 2.7 rebounds, and 3 assists per game during that streak.
- Marquese Chriss was named the Western Conference's Rookie of The Month winner for January 2017 due to his overall performances that month when compared to the rest of the rookies under that stretch of time out in the Western Conference.
- Devin Booker would be named a Player of The Week candidate for the Western Conference from March 20–26, 2017 due to his performances that week, including the historic 70 point, 8 rebound, and six assist outing against the Boston Celtics on March 23.
- Tyler Ulis was named the Western Conference's Rookie of The Month winner for April 2017 due to his overall performances throughout the last few games of the season, leading all rookies in both points scored (20.7) and assists recorded (6.8) while also recording 3.8 rebounds per game as a 5'10" second round rookie. This season marked the second time in team history that two rookies would win NBA Rookie of The Month honors at separate points during a season, with the first time coming around the 1987–88 season with Armen Gilliam winning the Rookie of The Month award for January 1988 and Kevin Johnson (who got traded to Phoenix during that season) winning it in April 1988.

=== Records ===
- The five University of Kentucky players the team held before the start of the season in Eric Bledsoe, Archie Goodwin, Brandon Knight, Devin Booker, and Tyler Ulis would be the highest number of players that would ever be taken from one college at any time. All five of those players would wind up playing in some of the same games throughout the preseason, but not in the regular season due to the fact that Archie Goodwin would get waived before the start of the regular season, albeit at his own request.
- The Suns became the first team in NBA history to have three players at age 19 or younger play in the regular season with Devin Booker continuing to be a 19 year old until October 30 (their third game of the season), and the likes of 19 year old Marquese Chriss and 18 year old (at least until November 17) Dragan Bender all playing in the same game on their opening night game against the Sacramento Kings. It also happened again twice in the season due to their latest addition (at the time), Derrick Jones Jr., joining in on a few games himself in the regular season (after being called up from the D-League affiliate Northern Arizona Suns originally) before his 20th birthday on February 15, 2017.
  - The Suns also became the second team in league history (behind only Kevin Garnett's final season under the 2015–16 Minnesota Timberwolves) to have four players around the age of 20 to play for the team during the season, with point guard Tyler Ulis set to remain 20 years old until January 5, 2017. Not only that, but they also became the first team to have five players around the age of 20 also with Derrick Jones Jr. officially playing for the team alongside the previous four players on November 19, 2016 (and would do it again later on December 15, 2016). Derrick Jones Jr. would be an undrafted rookie that remained 19 until February 15, 2017; as a result, they became the first team to have four rookies at 20 or younger playing in the same game for the NBA.
- This season's Phoenix Suns team became the fifth team in NBA history to hold three different overtime games to start out their first six games of the regular season. The other four teams that did the same thing themselves were the 1962–63 San Francisco Warriors, the 1976–77 Boston Celtics, the 1991–92 Los Angeles Lakers, and the 2005–06 Charlotte Bobcats.
- Devin Booker would become the youngest player in NBA history to record consecutive games of 38 or more points scored in the regular season, with him recording 38 points in a close 112–111 overtime win against the New Orleans Pelicans on November 4, 2016, and then recording 39 points in a loss to the Los Angeles Lakers two days later, which happened about a week after his 20th birthday came and went.
  - That record would later be expanded to 39 points (or more) in the regular season with the two Mexico City games the Suns had on January 12 and 14, 2017, against the Dallas Mavericks and San Antonio Spurs respectively.
- Rookie Dragan Bender would be the second player (behind Tracy McGrady back in 1998) to record a double-double with a diverse stat range at around 10+ points, 10+ rebounds, 2+ assists, 3+ steals, and 2+ blocks as a teenager. Bender would record a double-double of 11 points and 13 rebounds to go with 3 steals, 2 assists, and 2 blocks in a 131–116 loss to the Houston Rockets on December 26, 2016.
  - Furthermore, Dragan Bender would also be the fourth-youngest player to have a double-double while also recording 3+ steals and 2+ in a game behind Tracy McGrady, Dwight Howard, and Josh Smith.
- Dragan Bender would also be the eighth-youngest player to ever record a double-double in a single game, behind only Tracy McGrady, LeBron James, Dwight Howard, Andris Biedriņš, Josh Smith, Andrew Bynum, and Giannis Antetokounmpo.
- The 39 points Devin Booker would score on January 12, 2017, against the Dallas Mavericks in Mexico City would surpass former Suns and Mavericks player Michael Finley to become the highest scorer in league history for someone playing in Mexico for an official NBA game (at the time).
  - He would repeat that record once again two days later in a close 108–105 surprise win over Kawhi Leonard and the San Antonio Spurs.
- The streak of games Devin Booker did from January 3 – February 4, 2017 where he recorded 16 straight games of 20 or more points recorded would make him the youngest player in league history to record such a long streak of games, beating out LeBron James' streaks of 15 straight games of such during the 2004–05 NBA season.
  - It would also be the second-longest streak in league history for a first-year or second-year player behind only Vince Carter's 23-game streak of 20 or more points back in the 1999–2000 NBA season.
- On March 23, 2017, the starting line-up of Tyler Ulis, Devin Booker, Derrick Jones Jr., Marquese Chriss, and Alex Len would provide the youngest starting line-up in NBA history, with the group holding an average age of 21 years, 14 days old in a loss to the Brooklyn Nets. It would break the record previously set by the Los Angeles Clippers back when Eric Bledsoe originally started for them alongside Eric Gordon, Al-Farouq Aminu, Blake Griffin, and DeAndre Jordan.
- A day later, Devin Booker would record a new career-high of 70 points after being stuck on 39 points for the longest time in a 130–120 loss to the Boston Celtics. That would not only make him the sixth ever player in NBA history to record at least 70 points in an NBA game (joining only Wilt Chamberlain (six times), Kobe Bryant, David Thompson, Elgin Baylor, and David Robinson), but he'd also become the youngest player in NBA history to record 70 points (let alone 60 points) in a single game at 20 years, 146 days old.
  - During that same game, Devin Booker made 20 free-throws in the second half of the spectacular showcase. Those 20 free-throws would tie a record-high set by Michael Jordan during the 1992-93 NBA season, where he would also make 20 free-throws in the second half of a December 30, 1992 game against the Miami Heat.
- The 2,774 points Devin Booker scored from the day he began his rookie season as an 18 year old player against the Dallas Mavericks to the last game he played this season against (funnily enough) the Dallas Mavericks would have him not only surpass Kobe Bryant's point total before the age of 21, but also allowed him to hold the fourth-most points scored in NBA history before turning 21 years old.
- Furthermore, the 246 three-pointers he made the past two seasons would break the previous record of 229 three-pointers made by Bradley Beal for players that shot three-pointers in the NBA before turning 21 years old.

=== Team Records ===
- Dragan Bender would be the team's youngest ever selection in the NBA draft, being 18 years, 219 days old at the time of his selection on June 23, 2016. Bender would also end up being one of the youngest players to ever play in the NBA by remaining 18 years old due to him being on the roster and playing before his 19th birthday came up on November 17, 2016. He also became the youngest Suns player to ever play before his 19th birthday while debuting with the team as early as October 26 (which would be about 21 days before his 19th birthday) against the Sacramento Kings, ahead of both the Polish/Swedish forward-center Maciej Lampe 13 days before his birthday during January of the 2003–04 season and shooting guard Devin Booker 2 days before his birthday during his rookie season last season.
- The starting line-up of Eric Bledsoe, Devin Booker, T. J. Warren, rookie power forward Marquese Chriss, and Alex Len would be the youngest recorded line-up in franchise history, being at an average age of 22.4 years old during their first start on November 9, 2016, with a win against the Detroit Pistons.
  - The Suns would later up that ante there by having the 20 year old undrafted rookie Derrick Jones Jr. join the rest of the players in the starting line-up on March 11, 2017, in their 100–98 buzzer-beating win over the Dallas Mavericks after it was announced that center Alex Len would not play that night due to a right hip contusion. As a result, that starting line-up would be the average age of 22.2 years old (or 22 years, 64 days old) at the time of that game.
    - They would break that line-up again due to 27 year old point guard Eric Bledsoe being out with a tendon injury and was replaced with 20 year old second round rookie Tyler Ulis as starting point guard, while Alex Len would return as starting center and Derrick Jones Jr. returned to the bench on March 15, 2017. That mark would later be broken again eight days later with Derrick Jones Jr. starting again while T. J. Warren injured himself on March 21, 2017. The final combined age for that starting line-up would be 21 years, 14 days old, which was younger than the starting line-ups of 15 of the teams in the Sweet 16 of the NCAA Division I men's basketball tournament for this season.
- The Suns' 78 bench points scored by the likes of Alan Williams, Brandon Knight, Jared Dudley, P. J. Tucker, Leandro Barbosa, and rookie Tyler Ulis on November 18, 2016, against the Indiana Pacers would be the most scored by the team's bench since January 17, 1995 against the Denver Nuggets.
- Tyson Chandler would be the oldest player in franchise history to record 20 or more rebounds in a game for the Suns. He originally recorded 21 rebounds in a close 120–119 overtime loss to the New Orleans Pelicans before he recorded a season-high 23 rebounds in a 113–111 overtime win against his former head coach, Jeff Hornacek, and the New York Knicks. He also recorded 20 rebounds in a 99–90 win over the Miami Heat on January 3, 2017, which wound up tying Shawn Marion as the third-best players to record 20 or more rebounds in a game with the Suns, behind only Amar'e Stoudemire and Charles Barkley.
- The 29 points Devin Booker scored in the fourth quarter in a 113–108 loss to the Dallas Mavericks in Mexico City on January 12, 2017, would be the highest number of points scored by a single Suns player, breaking the record previously set in the fourth quarter with 26 points scored by former Suns point guard Stephon Marbury in 2003.
- From January 3 against the Miami Heat to January 14, 2017, against the San Antonio Spurs in Mexico City, Tyson Chandler would record five straight games where he would produce 15 or more rebounds for the Suns. As a result, he'd surpass the record previously set by Shawn Marion back in 2006 to produce the longest streak in franchise history since the 1983–84 season with a single player recording 15 or more rebounds in multiple games for a single season.
- Devin Booker would join both Paul Westphal and Tom Chambers to become the only Suns players to record 39 or more points in back-to-back games, with Booker recording 39 points in both the January 12 and 14, 2017 games in Mexico City against the Dallas Mavericks and San Antonio Spurs.
- The 7–game streak from January 3–21, 2017 (excluding a game missed on January 17 due to gastroenteritis) where Tyson Chandler recorded 15 or more rebounds in each game would break the franchise record set by center Jim Fox back in the inaugural season by recording the most consecutive games played in a row with that number of rebounds recorded in each game, which was originally set with 6 games done in a row.
- The three games where Eric Bledsoe would record 40 or more points in eleven days (between the 40 point outing he had on January 22 against the Toronto Raptors and the 41 point outings he had at home on January 28 against the Denver Nuggets and on February 1 against his former team, the Los Angeles Clippers) between January 22 and February 1, 2017, would break the thirteen day stretch by Charlie Scott back in 1973 for the shortest amount of time set for three games of 40 or more points being scored by a player for the Suns.
- The February 15, 2017 game the Suns had against the Los Angeles Lakers would provide the greatest margin of victory for the franchise against their biggest rival. The 137–101 win against the Lakers would hold a 36-point difference between the two teams, which surpassed their previous greatest margin of victory against the Lakers, 35 points, back in 1973.
- The games where Kentucky alumni Eric Bledsoe hit a buzzer-beating game-winning three-pointer in overtime on November 2, 2016, against the Portland Trail Blazers, Devin Booker hitting a two-point buzzer-beater in the fourth quarter on February 3, 2017, against the Sacramento Kings, and rookie Tyler Ulis getting a game-winning three-pointer himself at the buzzer on March 5, 2017, against the Boston Celtics would be the most game-winning buzzer-beating shots in franchise history for an entire season.
  - It was later expanded upon on March 11, 2017, by Devin Booker hitting another two-point game-winner at the buzzer, this time against the Dallas Mavericks.
- From March 2–9, 2017, during the team's five game homestand, center/power forward Alan Williams became the first player in franchise history to record at least five straight games with double-doubles while coming off the bench.
- On March 24, 2017, during the 27th anniversary of Tom Chambers' 60-point game against the Seattle SuperSonics, Devin Booker would wind up breaking that team-high record by scoring 70 points in a 130–120 loss to the Boston Celtics. Not only that, but the 51 points he scored in the second-half would be the highest number of points scored for a player in a single half in franchise history, beating out the record previously set by Eddie Johnson.
- On April 7, 2017, Devin Booker would tie his own franchise record previously set on March 24 that same year by scoring 21 consecutive points in the fourth quarter in a blowout 120–99 win over the Oklahoma City Thunder. It is the most consecutive points scored in a single game for a player in franchise history.

=== Milestones ===
- Dragan Bender became the fifth 18-year-old rookie player to score at least 10 points in their regular season debuts in that age by scoring 10 points against the Sacramento Kings on October 26, 2016, with the other players on that list being Jonathan Bender, LeBron James, Dwight Howard, and his teammate, Devin Booker. It would also be the Suns' second straight season in a row where an 18-year-old rookie scores 10 or more points to start out his career in the NBA. Furthermore, he surpassed both Devin Booker and Amir Johnson to become the sixth-youngest player in NBA history to record 10 or more points in a game behind Dwight Howard, Bill Willoughby, LeBron James, Tracy McGrady, Andrew Bynum, and Kobe Bryant. Dragan Bender would also join Devin Booker and Giannis Antetokounmpo as the only 18-year-old players to score 10 or more points at that age ever since the 2006–07 season.
- Tyson Chandler would become the 48th highest rebounder in NBA history by surpassing Hall of Fame center Artis Gilmore on October 30, 2016, against the Golden State Warriors. He recorded a season-high (at the time) 18 rebounds, including 6 in the first quarter alone, in a surprisingly close 106–100 loss to a squad that held all four of Kevin Durant, Stephen Curry, Klay Thompson, and Draymond Green on board at exactly the same time.
- Tyson Chandler played his 1,000th game in the NBA on December 7, 2016, at home against the Indiana Pacers. During that game, he recorded a double-double of 10 points and 10 rebounds (with 2 assists to go with it) in a 109–94 loss to Indiana.
- Tyson Chandler would pass former center and current Sacramento Kings general manager Vlade Divac to become the 47th highest rebounder in NBA history at home on December 13, 2016, against his former head coach, Jeff Hornacek, and the New York Knicks, a former team he played with. He'd record a new season-high with 23 rebounds to go with 13 points in a close 113–111 overtime win over the Knicks.
- Tyson Chandler surpassed Hall of Fame small forward Bailey Howell to become the 46th highest rebounder in NBA history on December 23, 2016, at home against the Philadelphia 76ers. He'd record six rebounds in the first quarter alone to overtake Bailey Howell's spot on the list and finish with 12 overall in a 123–116 win over the 76ers.
- Since the end of 2013, the Phoenix Suns held the three-youngest players to record a double-double in a game for the NBA with Devin Booker last season (first getting one in January 2016 against the Charlotte Hornets), as well as both rookies Marquese Chriss on December 13, 2016, against the New York Knicks and Dragan Bender thirteen days later against the Houston Rockets, holding relatively significant double-doubles during their first seasons in the NBA at 19 years old.
- Tyson Chandler tied current Memphis Grizzlies power forward and fellow 2001 NBA draftee Zach Randolph as the 45th highest rebounder in NBA history by recording 6 six rebounds in a 109–98 loss to the Los Angeles Clippers on January 2, 2017. He would later pass 4-time NBA Finals champion Horace Grant to become the 44th highest rebounder in NBA history by recording 20 rebounds in a win against the Miami Heat a day later, while Randolph would be the newest, 45th highest rebounder by that point in time.
  - The next game after that, on January 5, Chandler wound up recording 18 rebounds in a 102–95 win against another former team of his, the Dallas Mavericks, which resulted in him surpassing former Suns power forward and 3–time NBA Finals champion A.C. Green as the 43rd highest rebounder in NBA history.
- A week later, on January 12, in a 113–108 loss against the Dallas Mavericks, Tyson Chandler would record a single block to reach a total of 1,267 blocks throughout his career. That would tie him with former British-American center James Donaldson to become the 50th best shot blocker in NBA history. Chandler would later surpass him a week later with another block recorded on January 19 in a 118–103 loss to the Cleveland Cavaliers.
- Tyson Chandler surpassed former center Marcus Camby to become the 42nd highest rebounder in NBA history. He'd record 15 rebounds against the San Antonio Spurs in a 108–105 win over them in Mexico City on January 14, 2017.
  - Furthermore, he also recorded the franchise's 30,000th steal with 4:37 left in the first quarter in that same game. The only franchises that have more steals recorded at this time around are the Golden State Warriors (when including their previous history in Philadelphia and San Francisco), the Oklahoma City Thunder (when including their history as the Seattle SuperSonics), the Philadelphia 76ers (likely also including their past history as the Syracuse Nationals), and the Milwaukee Bucks, a fellow 1968 franchise. Four other teams were close to joining the Suns by this time, including the Atlanta Hawks, who held 29,666 steals back on January 14, 2017.
- Not long after making his mark on the career best shot blockers list by surpassing James Donaldson, Tyson Chandler would tie another player on that list to be the 49th best shot blocker in league history, this time tying power forward Dale Davis with two shots blocked on January 24, 2017, in a brutally close 112–111 buzzer-beating loss to Andrew Wiggins and the Minnesota Timberwolves. He'd later surpass Davis to be the sole possessor of 49th place at that time on January 30, 2017, with two blocks in a blowout 115–96 loss to the Memphis Grizzlies. Chandler would only record 7 more blocks during the rest of this season before being shut down.
- Tyson Chandler surpassed Hall of Fame forward Dave DeBusschere to become the 41st highest rebounder in NBA history near the end of the game on February 3, 2017, against the Sacramento Kings at the Golden 1 Center. Chandler would put up 12 rebounds, including a critical rebound at around 30 seconds left in the ballgame, in a close 105–103 win over DeMarcus Cousins and his triple-double for the Kings, which ended with Devin Booker making a buzzer-beating shot over the Kings at the fourth quarter.
  - Tyson Chandler would ultimately slip off of the 41st spot with Zach Randolph not only retaking his position ahead of Tyson, but also tying up Sam Lacey on March 9, 2017.
- Alan Williams recorded not only 15 points and 15 rebounds in a blowout 116–96 win over the Indiana Pacers on November 16, 2016, but also 17 points and 15 rebounds in a 100–96 loss on February 26, 2017, against the Milwaukee Bucks. Both of these games would take place during his first 35 official NBA games played during his career. As a result, he'd join the likes of Raef LaFrentz, Elton Brand, Pau Gasol, Yao Ming, former Suns player (by status only) Emeka Okafor, Greg Oden, DeMarcus Cousins, Blake Griffin, and Julius Randle as the only players (during the past 19 seasons) to record multiple games of 15+ points and 15+ rebounds during their first 35 games of their NBA careers.
- Devin Booker became only the fifth player in NBA history to record 22 or more points per game when being 20 years old throughout the majority of their season, joining only former Suns player Shaquille O'Neal, LeBron James, Kevin Durant, and Kyrie Irving.

=== Team Milestones ===
- Tyler Ulis would be the first rookie to have consecutive games with at least four steals involved since Leandro Barbosa, with Tyler doing it on November 18 and 19, 2016.
- Eric Bledsoe would be the first player since Jason Kidd back in 2000 to record at least five consecutive games with 15 or more points scored, 5 or more rebounds grabbed, and 5 or more assists given from November 17–27, 2016.
- Devin Booker played his 100th game in the NBA on December 13, 2016, against the New York Knicks, the team of his former head coach, Jeff Hornacek. He'd end the game with 1,490 total points scored during his first 100 games with the Suns. The only Phoenix Suns players that scored more points in their first 100 games while making their debuts with the team are Walter Davis (2,420), Alvan Adams (1,834), and Armen Gilliam (1,658).
- Eric Bledsoe became the first Suns player since Amar'e Stoudemire back in the 2009–10 season and the first guard since Stephon Marbury back in the 2002–03 season to record three straight games of 30 or more points from December 9–13, 2016 (even though two of those three games ended in overtime).
- Leandro Barbosa played his 517th game with the Suns on December 28, 2016, against the team that originally drafted him back in 2003, the San Antonio Spurs. Barbosa would move past Amar'e Stoudemire to become the 10th longest tenured player in franchise history.
- Eric Bledsoe recorded the sixth ever game where a Suns player would have 40+ points and 13+ assists in a single game on January 22, 2017, in a 115–103 win over the Toronto Raptors.
- From January 3 – February 4, 2017, Devin Booker would produce 16 straight games of 20 or more points scored in a row. That would be the longest streak of that kind for the Suns since Amar'e Stoudemire last did it during the 2007–08 season.
- Furthermore, with Devin Booker averaging 25 points per game in the month of January (with Eric Bledsoe also coming close to that mark himself), it marked the first time a Suns player would average 25 points per game in a month since Amar'e Stoudemire back in 2010.
- Eric Bledsoe ended up surpassing former forward Cedric Ceballos to be the Suns' newest 30th best scorer in team history on February 10, 2017. He would record 23 points in 32:36 minutes of action under a blowout 115–97 win over Dwyane Wade, Jimmy Butler, Rajon Rondo, and the Chicago Bulls.
- Just a game later, Eric Bledsoe ended up beating out former center James Edwards as the team's newest 29th best scorer in team history. After resting his body on February 11, 2017, in a blowout loss to the Houston Rockets, Eric Bledsoe would record 37 points in a close, heartbreaking 110–108 loss over Anthony Davis and the New Orleans Pelicans on February 13.
  - A few minutes afterwards, Eric Bledsoe would overtake his former teammate in power forward Markieff Morris in order to be the team's newest 28th best scorer in team history. He would overtake his former teammate's spot around the same quarter he overtook James Edwards' position on the team in the same game.
- Leandro Barbosa would surpass Hall of Fame power forward/center and Ring of Honor member Connie Hawkins as the Suns' 14th best scorer of all-time on March 3, 2017 (the same night broadcaster Al McCoy would enter the Phoenix Suns Ring of Honor himself). Barbosa would record 14 points in 19:36 of playing time in a surprise 118–111 win over Russell Westbrook and the Oklahoma City Thunder a day after recording 16 points in 23:03 of playing time in the Suns' 120–103 blowout win at home over the Charlotte Hornets.
- The five blocks rookie Marquese Chriss had on March 5, 2017, in their close 109–106 buzzer-beating win over the Boston Celtics would be the highest number of blocks done by a player on the Suns since Amar'e Stoudemire back in 2008. It was also the most blocks had by a Suns rookie since Amar'e back on November 13, 2002.
  - That number would be matched 10 days later in a loss against the Sacramento Kings.
- Eric Bledsoe would surpass former Sixth Man of the Year small forward and current Suns broadcaster Eddie Johnson to become the Suns' 26th best all-time scorer by recording 28 points (including the 11 points he scored in the fourth quarter) in the same March 5, 2017 game where they pulled off the surprise 109–106 buzzer-beating win at home over the Boston Celtics.
- Eric Bledsoe surpassed Hall of Fame guard Dennis Johnson to become the team's 25th best all-time scorer on March 11, 2017, against the Dallas Mavericks. He'd tie the spot with Dennis with 1:36 left in the third quarter via a layup against the Mavericks, and would later surpass him with a three-pointer at 4:32 left in the fourth quarter, as the Suns would win 100–98 at the buzzer.
- Tyler Ulis became the first rookie since Steve Nash back on November 14, 1996 against the Vancouver Grizzlies to record a double-double of 12+ points and 12+ assists on March 15, 2017, against the Sacramento Kings.
- Leandro Barbosa surpassed his former head coach and shooting guard Jeff Hornacek on March 21, 2017, by recording 13 points in a blowout 114–97 loss against the Miami Heat. Barbosa would end up being the 13th highest scorer in franchise history on that night.
- Jared Dudley surpassed former Suns forward Cedric Ceballos on the team's all-time best scorers in franchise history by recording 11 points in a blowout 120–99 win over Mr. Triple-Double Russell Westbrook and the Oklahoma City Thunder on April 7, 2017.

== Injuries/Personal Missed Games ==
Player	Duration		Reason for Missed Time	Games Missed
Player	Start	End	Reason for Missed Time	Games Missed
Devin Booker	October 31, 2016	November 2, 2016	Sprained right big toe during the first road Oklahoma City game.	1
Derrick Jones Jr.	November 3, 2016	November 19, 2016	Assigned to the Northern Arizona Suns by Phoenix.	8
Tyson Chandler	November 8, 2016	November 16, 2016	His mother, Vernie Re Threadgill, had died.	4
Tyson Chandler	November 18, 2016	November 25, 2016	Attended funeral services for his mother.	4
T. J. Warren	November 19, 2016	December 17, 2016	Got a concussion during the road Indiana game.	13
Derrick Jones Jr.	November 25, 2016	December 15, 2016	Assigned to the Northern Arizona Suns by Phoenix.	9
Jared Dudley	November 27, 2016	November 30, 2016	Hurt left foot during practice.	1
Alex Len	December 13, 2016	December 17, 2016	Had a right hip contusion.	2
Derrick Jones Jr.	December 23, 2016	January 30, 2017	Assigned to the Northern Arizona Suns multiple times by Phoenix.	18
Brandon Knight	January 3, 2017	January 5, 2017	Sprained his right wrist during the second road L.A. Clippers game.	1
Brandon Knight	January 14, 2017	January 19, 2017	Hurt calf and got tendinitis after the first Mexico City game.	2
Tyson Chandler	January 16, 2017	January 19, 2017	Encountered gastroenteritis after the second Mexico City game.	1
Jared Dudley	January 16, 2017	January 26, 2017	Had some flu-like symptoms before the first home Utah game.	5
Dragan Bender	January 24, 2017	February 1, 2017	Twisted right ankle during the road Toronto game.	4
Dragan Bender	February 3, 2017	April 2, 2017	Had a contusion on his right ankle against the L.A. Clippers.	28
Alex Len	February 10, 2017	February 11, 2017	Suspended for a late-game altercation against Memphis.	1
Tyson Chandler	February 11, 2017	February 13, 2017	Twisted right ankle during the second quarter at home against Chicago.	1
Eric Bledsoe	February 11, 2017	February 13, 2017	Rest from a back-to-back night between Chicago at home and Houston.	1
Brandon Knight	February 24, 2017	The Entire Season	Recorded continuous back spasms after the All-Star Weekend was done.	26
Alex Len	March 11, 2017	March 15, 2017	Got a right hip contusion after last game against the L.A. Lakers.	2
Eric Bledsoe	March 15, 2017	The Entire Season	Held a bruised right tendon.	15
Leandro Barbosa	March 17, 2017	March 21, 2017	Had an illness after their second home game against Sacramento.	2
Devin Booker	March 19, 2017	March 21, 2017	Got a sprained ankle during their home game against Orlando.	1
Ronnie Price	March 19, 2017	March 28, 2017	Got a lower left leg contusion.	5
Alan Williams	March 21, 2017	March 23, 2017	Encountered gastroenteritis after the road Detroit game.	1
T. J. Warren	March 23, 2017	March 26, 2017	Had a left foot contusion after the road Miami game.	2
Devin Booker	March 28, 2017	March 30, 2017	Got an aggravated ankle during the road Charlotte game.	1
T. J. Warren	April 2, 2017	April 5, 2017	Got an illness before beginning the last Houston home game.	1
Leandro Barbosa	April 2, 2017	The Entire Season	Got right hamstring spasms before beginning the last Houston home game.	5
Jared Dudley	April 11, 2017	April 11, 2017	Hurt left toe / ligament after the last home game against Dallas.	1
Devin Booker	April 11, 2017	April 11, 2017	Rest up his body against Sacramento.	1

== Transactions ==
=== Trades ===
June 23, 2016	To Phoenix Suns (United States) Marquese Chriss (Pick 8)	To Sacramento Kings (Greece) Georgios Papagiannis (Pick 13) (Haiti) Skal Labissière (Pick 28) (Serbia) Bogdan Bogdanović (Player Rights) 2020 second round pick (from Detroit)
February 23, 2017	Three–team trade
February 23, 2017	To Phoenix Suns (United States) Mike Scott (from Atlanta) (United States) Jared Sullinger (from Toronto) (Turkey) Cenk Akyol (Draft rights from Atlanta) Cash Considerations (from Atlanta and Toronto) 2017 second round pick (from Toronto) 2018 second round pick (from Toronto)	To Atlanta Hawks Top-55 protected second round pick (from Phoenix)
February 23, 2017	To Toronto Raptors (United States) P. J. Tucker (from Phoenix)

=== Free agents ===
==== Additions ====
Player	Signed	Former team
Jared Dudley	Signed 3-year deal worth $30 Million	Washington Wizards
Leandro Barbosa	Signed 2-year deal worth $8 Million	Golden State Warriors
Derrick Jones Jr.	Signed 3-year non-guaranteed deal worth $2.5 Million	University of Nevada, Las Vegas Runnin' Rebels
Ronnie Price	Signed two 10-day contracts / 1-year deal worth $693,682	Oklahoma City Thunder / Phoenix Suns
Jarell Eddie	Signed two 10-day contracts worth $102,898	Windy City Bulls
Elijah Millsap	Signed 2-year non-guaranteed deal worth $1,547,374	Northern Arizona Suns

a: The deal for Derrick Jones Jr. that was originally signed with the Suns after making it through training camp had him enter a non-guaranteed three year deal, similar to that of his former teammate, John Jenkins. However, unlike his former teammate, Derrick would end up guaranteeing at least his first season with the Suns (which was worth $543,471) on January 7, 2017 after providing some very promising efforts during his time in the D-League with their affiliate squad, the Northern Arizona Suns. His second year still allows him the chance to earn $905,249 guaranteed next year, while his third year allows him to earn $1,050,252 if he makes it that long. Furthermore, there's also a team option that allows him to stay for one extra year on the team, assuming he makes it to that point, for an extra $1,126,220.
b: Derrick Jones Jr. originally declared for the 2016 NBA draft similar to the team's other rookies like Dragan Bender, Marquese Chriss, and Tyler Ulis, but he was ultimately undrafted due to his lesser recognition at the University of Nevada, Las Vegas. He also first tried to play for the Sacramento Kings during the 2016 NBA Summer League, but due to an injury he had earlier on at that point, he could not play a single game with them during that time.
c: Ronnie Price first signed a couple of 10-day contracts with the Suns after failing to find a new team to play with as a result of a failed preseason stint with his former team (at that point in time), the Oklahoma City Thunder. Each of those contracts were worth $91,274 at that time, which amounted to a total of $182,548 by that point. However, Ronnie would ultimately sign a one year deal with the team for the rest of the season on February 24, 2017 due to a combination of having him remain a positive influence on the younger players and providing some solid efforts on the court all-around. In addition to that, there was also hints of Price potentially accepting an assistant coach job with the Suns after this season ended, primarily on head coach Earl Watson's end, although Ronnie later noted that he still had a desire to play in the NBA.
d: Originally, Ronnie Price signed a two year deal worth $5,000,000 to play as a primary back-up point guard for Russell Westbrook and the Oklahoma City Thunder on July 25, 2016. However, despite having his deal be fully guaranteed at the time, Price was ultimately waived from the team on October 27, 2016 before even having a chance to play in the regular season for them. Because of that brief stint in the pre-season, most media outlets look to merge Price's previous season with the Phoenix Suns with the current one at hand and say he didn't truly leave the Suns during that point in time, even though he only officially returned to the team on January 27, 2017.
e: Because Elijah Millsap signed with the Phoenix Suns at such a late point in the regular season (April 9, 2017), he was ultimately signed to a non-guaranteed two year deal with the Phoenix Suns after the consistently good work he provided for their D-League squad, the Northern Arizona Suns. What that means is that even though his first "year" with the Suns was guaranteed money for Elijah (at a total of $23,069), his second year with them isn't fully guaranteed until January 7, 2018 in the event he remains with the team by then.

==== Subtractions ====
Player	Reason left	New team
Bogdan Bogdanović	Traded	Sacramento Kings / (Turkey) Fenerbahçe (Ülker)
Mirza Teletović	Unrestricted free agent	Milwaukee Bucks
Jon Leuer	Unrestricted free agent	Detroit Pistons
Ronnie Price	Unrestricted free agent	Oklahoma City Thunder / Phoenix Suns
Chase Budinger	Unrestricted free agent	Brooklyn Nets / (Spain) Club Deportivo Saski-Baskonia, S.A.D.
Alec Brown	Waived / Traded	Northern Arizona Suns / Windy City Bulls / (Spain) Movistar Estudiantes, S.A.D.
Archie Goodwin	Waived	New Orleans Pelicans / Greensboro Swarm / Brooklyn Nets
John Jenkins	Waived	Westchester Knicks
P. J. Tucker	Traded	(Canada) Toronto Raptors
Mike Scott	Waived	Washington Wizards
Jared Sullinger	Waived	(China) Shenzhen New Century Leopards
Jarell Eddie	Second 10-day contract expired	Windy City Bulls / Boston Celtics / Chicago Bulls

f: While Bogdan Bogdanović never played for the Phoenix Suns; his refusal to sign with the team when he was first given the chance to was what ultimately caused him to get traded to the Sacramento Kings on the night of the 2016 NBA draft, where his draft rights went alongside Pick 13 (who became the Greek center Georgios Papagiannis), Pick 28 (who was Haitian center/power forward Skal Labissière from the University of Kentucky), and the Detroit Pistons' 2020 second round draft pick (which eventually became Xavier Tillman) out to Sacramento in exchange for the Kings' 8th pick of the draft, which was power forward Marquese Chriss.
g: Even though Bogdan Bogdanović's draft rights were traded to the Sacramento Kings, he ultimately made the decision to remain with his then-current international squad, Fenerbahçe (Ülker), a few days before the 2016 NBA draft began, for the purpose of helping the Turkish squad win their first ever EuroLeague championship.
h: Chase Budinger originally signed a (non-guaranteed) deal to play for the Brooklyn Nets on September 21, 2016. However, much like with Ronnie Price during his brief stint with the Oklahoma City Thunder, Chase Budinger would ultimately not get picked up by Brooklyn for the regular season, although his decision was confirmed on October 18, 2016 instead. After being waived by the Nets, Chase would sign a one year deal with the Club Deportivo Saski-Baskonia, S.A.D. out in Spain on October 27, 2016.
i: Even though Alec Brown never played an official game with the Phoenix Suns, according to some sources, Brown was signed up for a training camp deal on September 14, 2016 for an apparent purpose of retaining his draft rights with the team. However, while he was waived from the team just three days after his original training camp contract came and went for that original purpose of retaining his draft rights, those rights were ultimately traded away to the Windy City Bulls on September 19, 2017.
j: While Alec Brown never originally played for the Northern Arizona Suns (having previously just played for the Obradoiro Clube de Amigos do Baloncesto out in Spain a season prior), he was originally projected to play for them there after having his contract waived by their parent organization. However, his rights would be traded away to the newly formed Windy City Bulls D-League franchise, who are a child organization to the parent Chicago Bulls franchise. Brown would continue playing for the Windy City Bulls until the end of their season on April 6, 2017, where he later signed up for the Movistar Estudiantes, S.A.D. in Spain for the rest of the season soon afterwards.
k: While Archie Goodwin was ultimately waived by the Phoenix Suns on October 24, 2016 after their pre-season concluded, he originally asked general manager Ryan McDonough to be traded during the pre-season if it was at all possible for him. However, the Suns didn't find any good offers for Archie whatsoever, and they were unfortunately forced to waive him over players like John Jenkins and Derrick Jones Jr. instead, despite providing some better results than either player (especially John Jenkins) during the pre-season.
l: Originally, Archie Goodwin signed a deal to play with the struggling New Orleans Pelicans on November 7, 2016, after starting out the season with a surprisingly poor record. However, after only playing three games with the Pelicans, Goodwin was waived by them thirteen days later on November 20. After that, Goodwin was forced to play out in the D-League under yet another expansion squad, the Greensboro Swarm (a child organization of the parent Charlotte Hornets franchise), ten days later on November 30. He would continue to play for Greensboro until March 15, 2017, where he originally signed a 10-day contract with the Brooklyn Nets. After showcasing his worth to them (to the point of having them considerably improve themselves later on in the season, albeit not enough to have the worst record that season), he signed another 10-day contract with them on March 25 before having a two year deal on April 5, 2017 confirmed with the Nets.
m: Even though John Jenkins was waived on January 6, 2017 after failing to showcase any significant value or worth for the team in any way, Jenkins was partially guaranteed $525,481 throughout the season he was with the team thanks to a previous three year contract he signed with the team giving out partial guarantees after staying with Phoenix beyond his first season with the squad.
n: Both Jared Sullinger and Mike Scott never played a single game with the Suns thanks to them being waived for salary purposes relating to the respective trades they were both involved with, between Jared Sullinger being given to the Suns alongside two second round draft picks in 2017 & 2018 and $1,000,000 in a traded player exception in exchange for P. J. Tucker going back to his original NBA team, the Toronto Raptors, and Mike Scott going to the team was originally projected to draft him before the Josh Childress trade came and went alongside the draft rights to Turkish shooting guard Cenk Akyol and $500,000 via another traded player exception in exchange for a second round pick this year that ultimately would not be going to the Atlanta Hawks due to their own second round pick being top 55 protected this year. Both players were primarily involved with helping the team get above the salary floor before the end of the season.
o: Neither Jared Sullinger nor Mike Scott managed to sign up with a new team after being waived by the Suns this season. In the case of Mike Scott, it related to him dealing with a court case involving him and his brother, which went on until May 3, 2017, where both him and his brother were cleared due to there being racial profiling involved with that case. Mike Scott would sign up with the Washington Wizards on the Fourth of July in 2017, while Jared Sullinger ultimately went to China to play for the Shenzhen New Century Leopards on September 12, 2017.
p: As a result of signing with the Phoenix Suns so late into the season, Jarell Eddie did not find a new team to play with after ending his season with them early on April 7, 2017. He would be without a team to play for until September 12, 2017, where he got a training camp deal with the Chicago Bulls. He would later be off of the team on October 16, 2017 (one day before the upcoming season began) with Chicago signing Kay Felder that day before returning to Chicago's affiliate team, the Windy City Bulls, on October 24, 2017. He would remain in the Windy City until January 20, 2018, where he would sign a 10-day contract with the Boston Celtics. However, he would return to the Windy City Bulls on January 30 after his 10 day contract in Boston expired, which ultimately led to Eddie going to the Chicago Bulls on February 28, 2018 with their own 10-day contract for him.
