= Dragan Bender =

Croatian basketball player (born 1997)

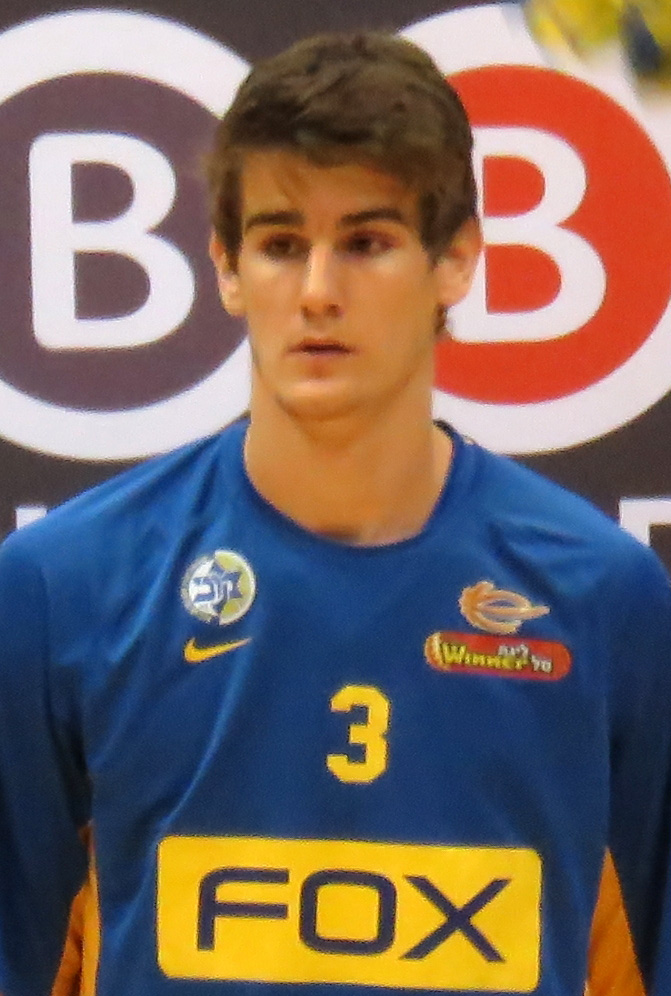
- Bender with Maccabi Tel Aviv in 2015

Personal information
- Born: 17 November 1997 (age 28) Čapljina, Bosnia and Herzegovina
- Listed height: 7 ft 0 in (2.13 m)
- Listed weight: 225 lb (102 kg)

Career information
- NBA draft: 2016: 1st round, 4th overall pick
- Drafted by: Phoenix Suns
- Playing career: 2012–2022
- Position: Power forward / center
- Number: 35, 17, 10

Career history
- 2012–2013: Split
- 2013–2014: Kaštela
- 2014–2016: Maccabi Tel Aviv
- 2014–2015: →Ironi Ramat Gan
- 2016–2019: Phoenix Suns
- 2019–2020: Milwaukee Bucks
- 2019–2020: →Wisconsin Herd
- 2020: Golden State Warriors
- 2020–2021: Maccabi Tel Aviv
- 2022: Obradoiro CAB

Career highlights
- Israeli League champion (2021); 2× Israeli Cup champion (2016, 2021); 2× Israeli League Cup champion (2015, 2020)
- Stats at NBA.com
- Stats at Basketball Reference
Medals
Men's basketball
Representing Croatia
European U-18 Championship
Bronze medal – third place	2014 Turkey	U-18 Team

Dragan Bender (born 17 November 1997) is a Croatian former professional basketball player. He stands 7 ft 0 in (2.13 m) and played the power forward and center positions. He was selected by the Phoenix Suns with the fourth overall pick in the 2016 NBA draft but only played four years in the league. Bender represents the Croatian national team, with experience in the FIBA Europe junior tournaments. Before playing in Israel, he competed with multiple teams in Croatia and in Nikola Vujčić's academy.

== Early life ==
Bender was born on 17 November 1997, in Čapljina, Bosnia and Herzegovina, and he later moved to Split, Croatia. At 12 years of age, he started playing at Nikola Vujčić's basketball academy as a point guard. Vujčić was a former Maccabi Tel Aviv star and became Bender's guardian. At the academy, Bender became a more versatile player and he "learned how to play all the positions on the court." Bender played there along with his older brother, Ivan, with Bender also playing against guys that were Ivan's age when he first started playing. Bender also played with the KK Split youth teams at this time, and he appeared for the Croatian under-16 national basketball team. He idolized and modeled his game after Toni Kukoč, a former Croatian NBA player, while growing up and watched his old game tape. He mostly watched EuroLeague games but would sometimes tune into the NBA as well. One of his favorite EuroLeague players was Šarūnas Jasikevičius.

== Professional career ==
=== Split (2012–2013) ===
Bender made his professional debut at 15 years of age with KK Split. He played only a total of six minutes and added two points and one rebound.

=== Kaštela (2013–2014) ===
For the following season, Bender remained in Croatia and signed with KK Kaštela, who played in the country's second-best league. With his help, the team was promoted to the A-1 Liga, the top league in Croatia. Most notably, he made a game-winning shot with three seconds remaining against KK Gorica to help his team secure the promotion. Later, in February 2014, Bender joined the KK Cedevita junior team for the Euroleague Basketball Next Generation Tournament. He put up 21 points, 9 rebounds, and 6 assists vs the junior team of the Serbian club KK Mega Basket.

=== Ironi Ramat Gan (2014–2016) ===
In 2014, Bender signed a seven-year contract with Maccabi Tel Aviv, a team that played in the Israeli Basketball Premier League and the EuroLeague. He was soon loaned to Ironi Ramat Gan of the Liga Leumit, the second-tier-level league in Israel, for the 2014–15 season. He made his debut on 21 October 2014, posting 13 points, 13 rebounds, and 4 assists vs Ramat HaSharon. He recorded another double-double on 12 December, with 23 points and 12 rebounds in a win over Maccabi Ra'anana. Bender scored a season-high 25 points as his team defeated Barak Netanya by one point on 1 January 2015. After 28 games, he finished the season averaging 9.7 points, 7.4 rebounds, 2.6 assists, and 1.1 blocks. As the season came to a close, Bender returned to Maccabi Tel Aviv.

=== Maccabi Tel Aviv (2015–2016) ===
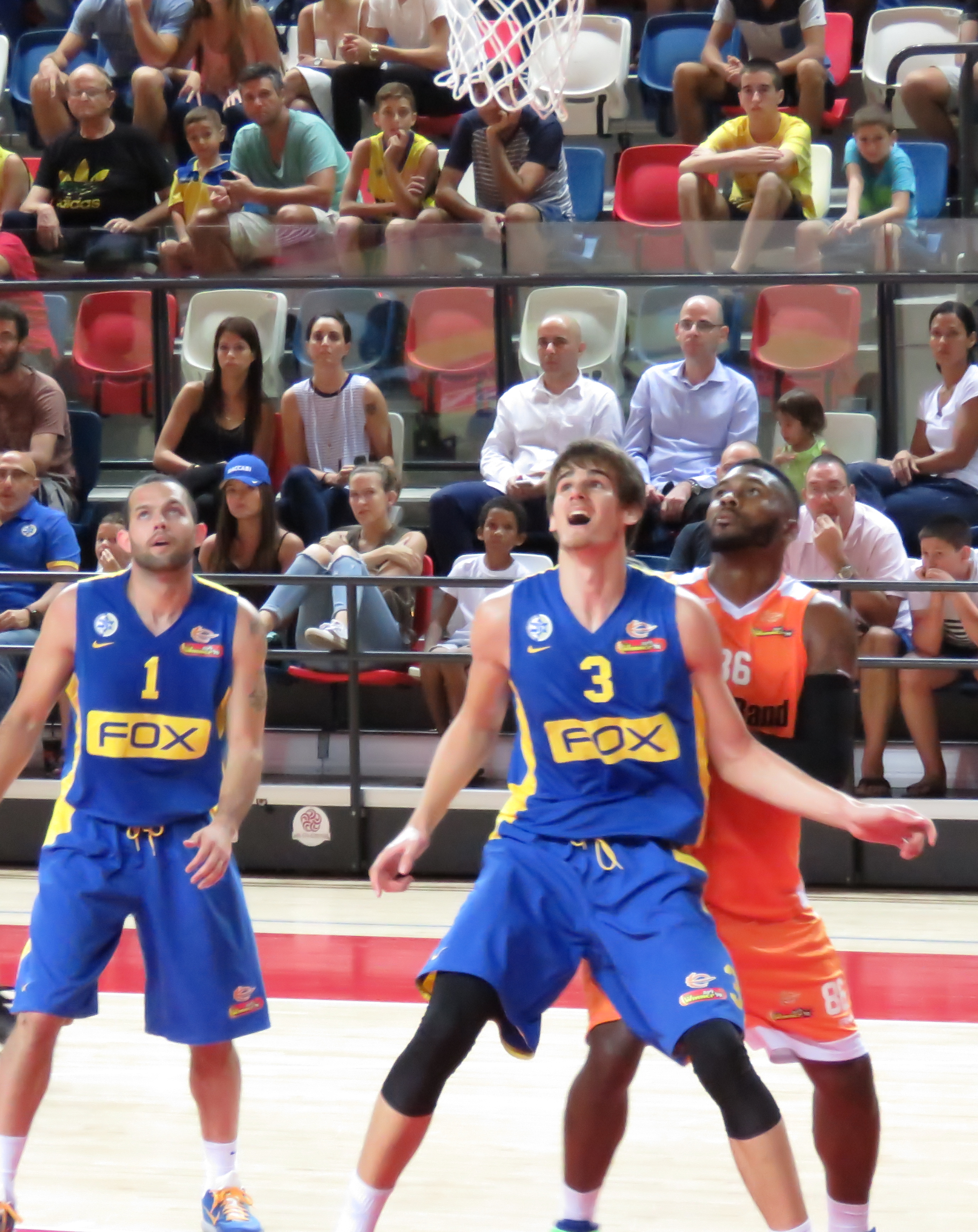
Bender (#3) with Maccabi Tel Aviv in 2015

Bender debuted for Maccabi Tel Aviv in the Israeli Premier League on 11 October 2015, with 5 points, 3 rebounds, and 3 blocks in a win over Maccabi Kiryat Gat. He scored double figures for the first time with the team in a rematch with Kiryat Gat, adding 15 points. Bender scored a season-high 16 points on 31 December 2015, as his team defeated Hapoel Holon. In 2015–16, he helped Maccabi Tel Aviv repeat as winners in the 2016 Israeli State Cup, and he was named a foreign All-Star for the 2016 Israeli All-Star game.

On 6 April 2016, Bender declared for the 2016 NBA draft. His contract with Maccabi Tel Aviv was later bought out for $1.3 million.

=== Phoenix Suns (2016–2019) ===
On 23 June 2016, Bender was selected by the Phoenix Suns with the fourth overall pick in the 2016 NBA draft. He was widely billed as the best international prospect available in the draft, highly valued for his ability to shoot the ball in various ways as a big man, as well as his overall untapped potential in other facets of the game. As the fourth overall pick, Bender became the Suns' highest-selected rookie since Armen Gilliam was taken second overall in 1987, and the highest-selected Croatian to be taken in an NBA draft. On 7 July, he signed his rookie scale contract with the Suns and joined the team for the 2016 NBA Summer League. Bender made his debut for the Suns in their season opener on 26 October 2016, scoring 10 points on 4-of-5 shooting in a 113–94 loss to the Sacramento Kings. With Bender playing alongside Devin Booker and fellow rookie Marquese Chriss, the Suns became the first NBA team to get three teenagers on the floor in the same game. Bender also joined Booker and Giannis Antetokounmpo as the only 18-year-olds to score 10 points in a game since 2006–07. He had his second 10-point game of the season on 8 November in a 124–121 loss to the Portland Trail Blazers. He then had his third 10-point game of the season on 3 December in a 138–109 loss to the Golden State Warriors. On 26 December, Bender recorded his first career double-double with season highs of 11 points and 13 rebounds in a 131–115 loss to the Houston Rockets. On 8 February 2017, Bender underwent a successful routine arthroscopic procedure on his right ankle to remove a bone spur. He was subsequently ruled out for approximately four to six weeks. He returned to action on 2 April 2017, against Houston.

In July 2017, Bender re-joined the Suns for the 2017 NBA Summer League. In five games, he averaged 14.2 points, 6.0 rebounds, and 2.4 assists per game. On 13 November 2017, Bender scored a career-high 15 points in a 100–93 loss to the Los Angeles Lakers. On 16 December 2017, he set a new career high with 17 points in a 108–106 win over the Minnesota Timberwolves. On 7 January 2018, he scored 17 of his then career-high 20 points in the second half of the Suns' 114–100 win over the Oklahoma City Thunder. He made a career-best six 3-pointers, going 5 of 6 in the second half. On 10 February 2018, he scored a career-high 23 points in a 123–113 loss to the Denver Nuggets. On 8 April 2018, Bender recorded 14 points and a career-high 14 rebounds in a 117–100 loss to the Golden State Warriors.

In July 2018, Bender re-joined the Suns for the 2018 NBA Summer League. On 30 October 2018, the Suns declined Bender's $5.9 million fourth year rookie option, making him a free agent after the season. On 5 April 2019, Bender recorded a career-high seven blocks in a 133–126 overtime win over the New Orleans Pelicans.

=== Milwaukee Bucks (2019–2020) ===
In July 2019, Bender signed a two-year minimum deal with the Milwaukee Bucks. The first year of Bender's deal was partially guaranteed, but it became fully guaranteed when the Bucks did not waive Bender by 7 January, while the second is non-guaranteed. Bender was assigned to the Wisconsin Herd for the start of the NBA G League season. On 10 February 2020, the Milwaukee Bucks announced that they had waived Bender.

=== Golden State Warriors (2020) ===
On 23 February 2020, the Golden State Warriors announced that they had signed Bender to a 10-day contract. In his first game he played against his former team, the Phoenix Suns, he recorded 13 points and 9 rebounds in a 115–99 win on 29 February. He then acquired a second 10-day contract on 5 March 2020. In his last game before the NBA season was suspended due to the COVID-19 pandemic, Bender tied his career high with 23 points on 8-of-12 shooting and added 7 rebounds in a 131–107 loss to the Los Angeles Clippers on 10 March. The season was suspended while Bender was still on contract, and he became a free agent before the season restarted in July. Bender's short and uneventful NBA career marked him as a high-profile draft bust.

=== Maccabi Tel Aviv (2020–2021) ===
On 23 September 2020, Bender returned to the Israeli team Maccabi Tel Aviv. During the 2020–21 season, he averaged 6.6 points, 3.8 rebounds over 34 EuroLeague games. He suffered a season-ending injury in May 2021 that caused him to miss the entire 2021–22 season.

=== Obradoiro (2022) ===
On August 23, 2022, Bender signed with Monbus Obradoiro of the Spanish Liga ACB. On December 11, he suffered a torn ACL injury in his left knee and thus finished a season averaging 17.2 points and 6.6 rebounds on 52.7% shooting from the field in 10 games played for Obradoiro.

== National team career ==
=== Junior national team ===
Bender competed for the Croatian national Under-16 team at the 2012 FIBA Europe Under-16 Championship. in Latvia and Lithuania. Through five contests, he averaged 2.8 points and 1.4 rebounds in 5.6 minutes per game. The following year, he came back to the 2013 FIBA Europe Under-16 Championship in Ukraine, improving through 9 games to 9.8 points, 10.8 rebounds and 4.1 assists in 35.4 minutes per game. Bender improved even further, while playing with the Croatian national Under-18 team, at the 2014 FIBA Europe Under-18 Championship in Turkey. In 9 games, he averaged 14.4 points, 10.4 rebounds and 4.9 assists in 29 minutes per game, helping his team win the bronze medal, and being named to All-Tournament Team in the process.

In 2015, Bender was selected by Croatia for the 2015 FIBA Under-19 World Cup in Crete, Greece, but he was forced to withdraw because the team's players were obliged to wear Jordan Brand clothes and shoes, due to a sponsorship agreement. Bender had signed a similar agreement with his sponsor Adidas, which prevented him to wear other brands. Bender expressed disappointment in the Croatian Basketball Federation's decision, even saying they had no reason to attack his loyalty to Croatia, or his family's loyalty to it. Adidas later designed a logo-less pair of shoes for Bender, in order for him to play with Maccabi Tel Aviv, since they are also sponsored by Jordan Brand as well, as a response to the Croatian Basketball Federation's stance.

=== Senior national team ===
In June 2017, Bender was granted permission from the Phoenix Suns to play for the senior Croatian national team at EuroBasket 2017. At EuroBasket 2017, he averaged 4.3 points, 2 rebounds, and 1 assist per game, in 6 games played.

== Player profile ==
Bender has been strongly compared to Kristaps Porziņģis to the point where NBA executives considered him a Top 5 selection similar to Porziņģis because of their playing styles, either due to it being a selling point or being a good cover overall. However, while Porziņģis may be the stronger shooter and scorer, Bender is consistently labeled as the stronger passer and ball-handler.

== Career statistics ==
Legend
GP	Games played	GS	Games started	MPG	Minutes per game
FG%	Field-goal percentage	3P%	3-point field-goal percentage	FT%	Free-throw percentage
RPG	Rebounds per game	APG	Assists per game	SPG	Steals per game
BPG	Blocks per game	PPG	Points per game	PIR	Performance index rating
**Bold**	Career high	*	Led the league

=== NBA ===
==== Regular season ====
Year	Team	GP	GS	MPG	FG%	3P%	FT%	RPG	APG	SPG	BPG	PPG
2016–17	Phoenix	43	0	13.3	.354	.277	.364	2.4	.5	.2	.5	3.4
2017–18	Phoenix	**82***	**37**	**25.2**	.386	.366	**.765**	4.4	1.6	.3	.6	6.5
2018–19	Phoenix	46	27	18.0	.447	.218	.593	4.0	1.2	**.4**	.5	5.0
2019–20	Milwaukee	7	0	13.0	**.476**	**.444**	.667	2.9	1.3	.0	**.7**	3.7
2019–20	Golden State	9	3	21.7	.437	.324	.727	**5.9**	**2.1**	**.4**	.4	**9.0**
Career		187	67	20.1	.399	.323	.654	3.9	1.3	.3	.6	5.4

=== EuroLeague ===
Year	Team	GP	GS	MPG	FG%	3P%	FT%	RPG	APG	SPG	BPG	PPG	PIR
2015–16	Maccabi Tel Aviv	7	0	10.5	.333	.250	.500	1.4	.6	.3	.4	2.1	1.1
2020–21	Maccabi Tel Aviv	**34**	**16**	**19.1**	**.476**	**.345**	**.756**	**3.8**	**.7**	**.4**	**.5**	**6.6**	**6.7**
Career		41	16	17.4	.463	.337	.745	1.4	.6	.3	.4	5.9	5.7

== Personal life ==
Bender's older brother, Ivan, played college basketball as a forward for the Maryland Terrapins.

In order to learn the English language at a young age, Bender watched American sitcoms like Friends and The Fresh Prince of Bel-Air.

== See also ==
- List of oldest and youngest National Basketball Association players
- List of European basketball players in the United States
