= Wilfried Pollagba =

Central African basketball player

Hit Trésor
- Position: Point guard
- League: Central African Basketball League

Personal information
- Born: October 10, 1991 (age 35) Bangui, Central African Republic
- Listed height: 5 ft 11 in (1.80 m)

Wilfried Ladislas Pollagba Malikode (born October 10, 1991) is a Central African professional basketball player who currently plays for Hit Trésor of the Central African Division I Basketball League.

== International career ==
Pollagba has previously represented the Central African Republic at international events. He played for his country at the 2008 FIBA Africa Under-18 Championship. Pollagba was named to the preliminary squad for the AfroBasket 2015 by head coach Aubin-Thierry Goporo.

== Personal ==
Pollagba commented on the lack of safety for basketball player in the Central African Republic for the newspaper France 24 in 2014. He said, "Some of my teammates have stopped practicing completely. They found it too dangerous to train at night after work as they used to do, because the security risk is greatest after dark."
