= Bangui Sporting Club =

- 2023–24 Bangui Sporting Club season
- Nickname: BSC
- League: LBBB
- Founded: 20 June 2017; 8 years ago
- History: GIBA-BCAGS (2017–2022); Bangui Sporting Club (2022–present)
- Location: Bangui, Central African Republic
- Team colours: Navy, Red and White
- Head coach: François Enyengue
- Championships: 2 (2022, 2023)

Bangui Sporting Club, also known as Bangui SC, is a Central African basketball team based in Bangui. The team plays in the Bangui Basketball League (LBBB) and has won the championship in 2022 and 2023.

In the 2024 season, Bangui played in the Basketball Africa League (BAL), as the first team from the Central African Republic in the league. The team colors are navy, red and white.

== History ==
The club was founded in 2017 as GIBA-BCAGS, by former national team player Cyrille Damango. The team entered the Bangui Basketball League (LBBB) after its establishment, and finished as runners-up in 2021, losing to Tondema In the final. The team changed its name to Bangui Sporting Club on 4 April 2022.

Following their 2022 national championship, Sporting represented the Central African Republic in the 2023 BAL qualification, and its roster featured national team players Max Kouguere and Steven-Emile Perriere, as well as Rwandan guard Kenny Gasana and center Kendall Gray. Sporting narrowly missed out on a place in the BAL, after losing the third place game to Stade Malien.

=== Debut season in the BAL (2023–24) ===
They repeated as LBBB champions in 2023 after defeating New Tech Bantou in the finals, with national team players Evans Ganapamo and Max Kouguere on the roster. As champions, they qualified once again for the Road to BAL. Before the beginning of the Road to BAL, Sporting hired Liz Mills as their new head coach. Bangui had a successful run which was highlighted by their 4 November semi-final win over Al Ahly Benghazi, which sealed their qualification to the 2024 BAL season. Thus, Bangui Sporting Club became the first team from the Central African Republic to qualify for the BAL. and winning the West Division title after beating FUS Rabat in the final on 5 November.

Following financial issues of the organization ahead of the BAL, Bangui struggled to pay its players after the successful Road to BAL campaign and coach Mills did not re-sign. In March, Bangui appointed Justin Serresse as their new head coach, however, he quickly left the team over payment disputes as well. Bangui nevertheless made a successful debut in the BAL with François Enyengue as coach, and with notable players such as Thierry Darlan and Kurt-Curry Wegscheider on their team. Bangui finished third in the Nile Conference with a 3–3 record.

== Honours ==
Bangui Basketball League

- Champions (2): 2022, 2023
  - Runners-up (1): 2021

Road to BAL

- West Division Champions (1): 2023

== Players ==
=== Current roster ===
The following is the Bangui Sporting Club roster for the 2024 BAL qualification:

Note: Flags indicate national team eligibility at FIBA-sanctioned events. Players may hold other non-FIBA nationalities not displayed.

Bangui Sporting Club roster
Players
Coaches

Pos.	No.	Nat.	Name	Ht.	Age
F	1	(Central African Republic)	Ganapamo, Evans	2.01 m (6 ft 7 in)	31 – 19 August 1994
F	2	(Central African Republic)	Kottaud, Jordao	1.98 m (6 ft 6 in)	32 – 8 January 1994
PG	4	(United States)	Johnson, Bijan	1.87 m (6 ft 2 in)	29 – 23 February 1996
PF	7	(Australia)	Higgins-Titsha, Alex	2.01 m (6 ft 7 in)	25 – 12 July 2000
G	8	(Central African Republic)	Kamayengue, Yasser	1.80 m (5 ft 11 in)	20 – 16 April 2005
SG	10	(Central African Republic)	Nambaï, Metson	1.92 m (6 ft 4 in)	30 – 27 February 1995
F	14	(Central African Republic)	Dondon, Elisée	1.90 m (6 ft 3 in)	27 – 29 June 1998
F	15	(Democratic Republic of the Congo)	Fula Nganga, Rolly	2.01 m (6 ft 7 in)	32 – 2 February 1993
F	22	(Central African Republic)	Kouguère, Max	1.99 m (6 ft 6 in)	38 – 12 March 1987
PF	24	(South Sudan)	Malou, Emmanuel	2.03 m (6 ft 8 in)	32 – 3 November 1993
C	35	(Central African Republic)	Djimrabaye, Jimmy	2.03 m (6 ft 8 in)	33 – 8 April 1992
PF	84	(Central African Republic)	Ngaïfei, Omega	2.04 m (6 ft 8 in)	24 – 14 May 2001

Head coach

- (Australia) Liz Mills

Assistant coach(es)

- (United States) Jeff Sparrow
- (Central African Republic) Ulrich Marida

Legend

- (C) Team captain
- Injured

- Roster
Updated: 4 November 2023

=== Notable players ===
Note: Flags indicate national team eligibility at FIBA-sanctioned events. Players may hold other non-FIBA nationalities not displayed.

Criteria

To appear in this section a player must have either:

- Set a club record or won an individual award while at the club
- Played at least one official international match for their national team at any time
- Played at least one official NBA match at any time.

- (Rwanda) Kenny Gasana
- (Rwanda) Kendall Gray
- (Central African Republic) Max Kouguère
- (Central African Republic) Jimmy Djimrabaye
- (Democratic Republic of the Congo) Rolly Fula Nganga
- (Central African Republic) Thierry Darlan

== Head coaches ==
- (Ivory Coast) Alpha Mane: (2022)
- (Australia) Liz Mills: (2023)
- (Cameroon) François Enyengue: (2024–present)

== Season by season ==
The following are Bangui Sporting Club's results in the BAL since their debut in 2024:

BAL champions	Conference champions	Playoff berth

Season	League	Conference	Regular season				Postseason	Head coach	Captain	Qualifying			
Season	League	Conference	Finish	Wins	Losses	Win %	Postseason	Head coach	Captain	Finish	W	L	Win %
Bangui Sporting Club
2023	BAL	Did not qualify								4th	5	2	.714
2024	BAL	Kalahari	3rd	3	3	.500	Did not qualify	François Enyengue	Jimmy Djimrabaye	1st	6	2	.750
2025	BAL	Qualified								Directly qualified			
Regular season record				3	3	.500	0 BAL championships			Record	11	4	.733
Playoffs record				0	0	–	0 BAL championships			Record	11	4	.733
