= 2016 NBA draft =

Basketball player selection

General information
- Sport: Basketball
- Date: June 23, 2016
- Location: Barclays Center (Brooklyn, New York)
- Networks: ESPN; TSN; ESPN Deportes; The Vertical

Overview
- 60 total selections in 2 rounds
- League: NBA
- First selection: Ben Simmons (Philadelphia 76ers)

The 2016 NBA draft was held on June 23, 2016, at Barclays Center in Brooklyn. It was televised nationally in the United States by ESPN, and was live streamed for the first time in NBA draft history by The Vertical. National Basketball Association (NBA) teams took turns selecting amateur U.S. college basketball players and other eligible players, including international players. The draft lottery took place during the playoffs, on May 17, 2016. This was the first time since the lottery system was introduced in 1985 that all NBA teams that missed out on the playoffs remained in the exact spots they were designated, meaning the 10-win/72-loss Philadelphia 76ers received the No. 1 pick, the Los Angeles Lakers kept the No. 2 pick, the Boston Celtics via the Brooklyn Nets got the No. 3 pick, and everyone else stayed in their same spots based on the regular season standings from the 2015–16 season.

Highlights from the draft include the second Australian No. 1 draft pick (Ben Simmons; the first being Andrew Bogut), the first Austrian to be selected into the NBA (Jakob Pöltl), the first Ghanaian to be selected into the NBA (Ben Bentil), the most Frenchmen to be taken overall (Guerschon Yabusele, Timothe Luwawu-Cabarrot, David Michineau, Isaia Cordinier, Petr Cornelie), the first time since the 1990 NBA draft that an Egyptian has been selected into the NBA (Abdel Nader), and the first time that two Chinese players have been selected into the same draft (Zhou Qi and Wang Zhelin) since the 2007 NBA draft. This draft was also notable for providing the most international draft prospects in draft history, with 28 different players representing different countries instead of the United States of America. It beat out the 2004 NBA draft for the most culturally diverse draft in league history. It was the second time that three players were selected from Serbian team Mega Leks in the same draft (Timothé Luwawu-Cabarrot, Ivica Zubac, Rade Zagorac), the first time being the 2014 NBA draft.

== Draft selections ==
| PG | Point guard | SG | Shooting guard | SF | Small forward | PF | Power forward | C | Center |

| * | Denotes player who has been selected for at least one All-Star Game and All-NBA Team |
| ^{+} | Denotes player who has been selected for at least one All-Star Game |
| ^{x} | Denotes player who has been selected for at least one All-NBA Team |
| ^{#} | Denotes player who has never appeared in an NBA regular-season or playoff game |
| ^{~} | Denotes player who has been selected as Rookie of the Year |

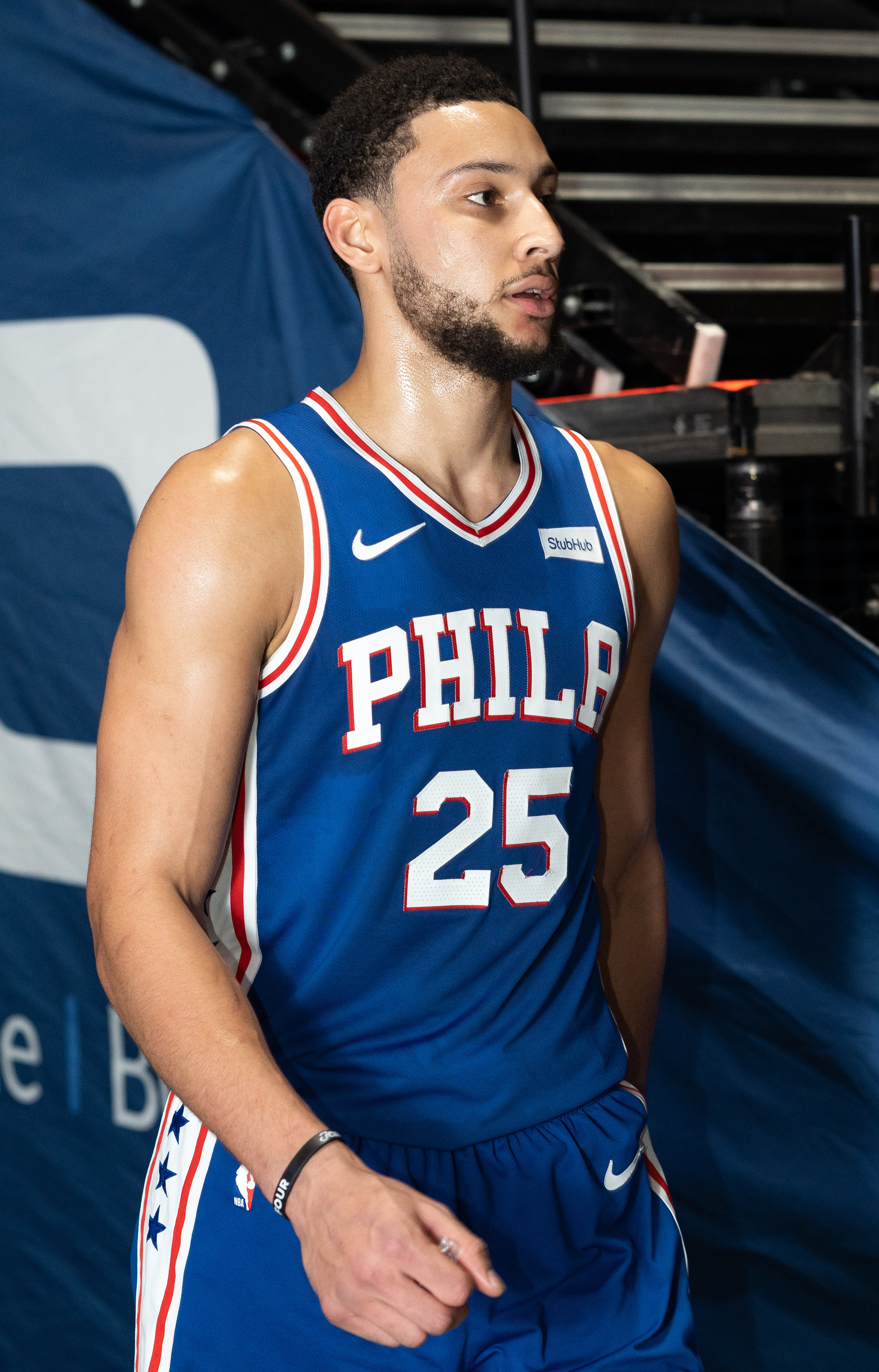
Ben Simmons was selected first overall by the Philadelphia 76ers.

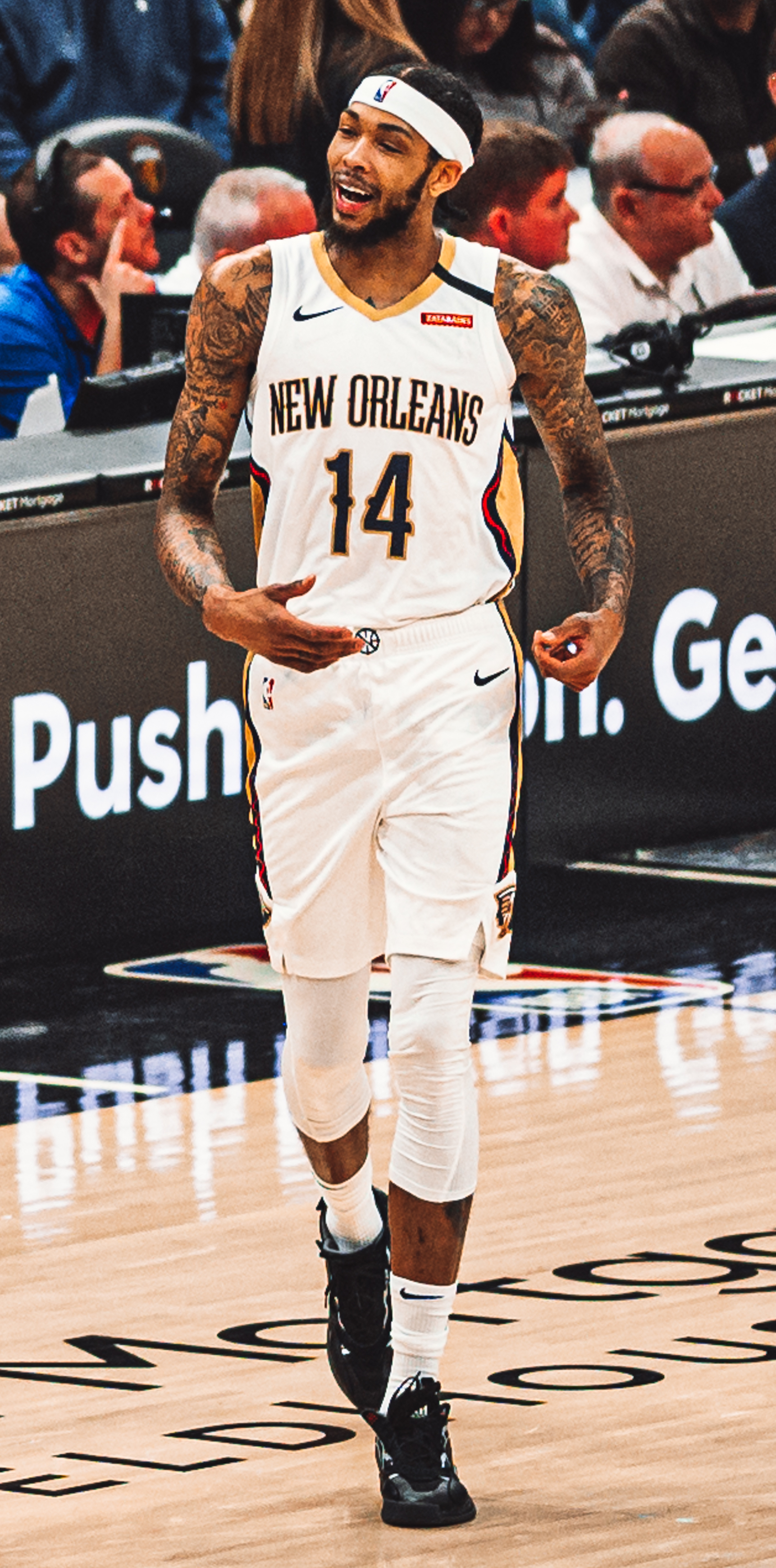
Brandon Ingram was selected second by the Los Angeles Lakers.

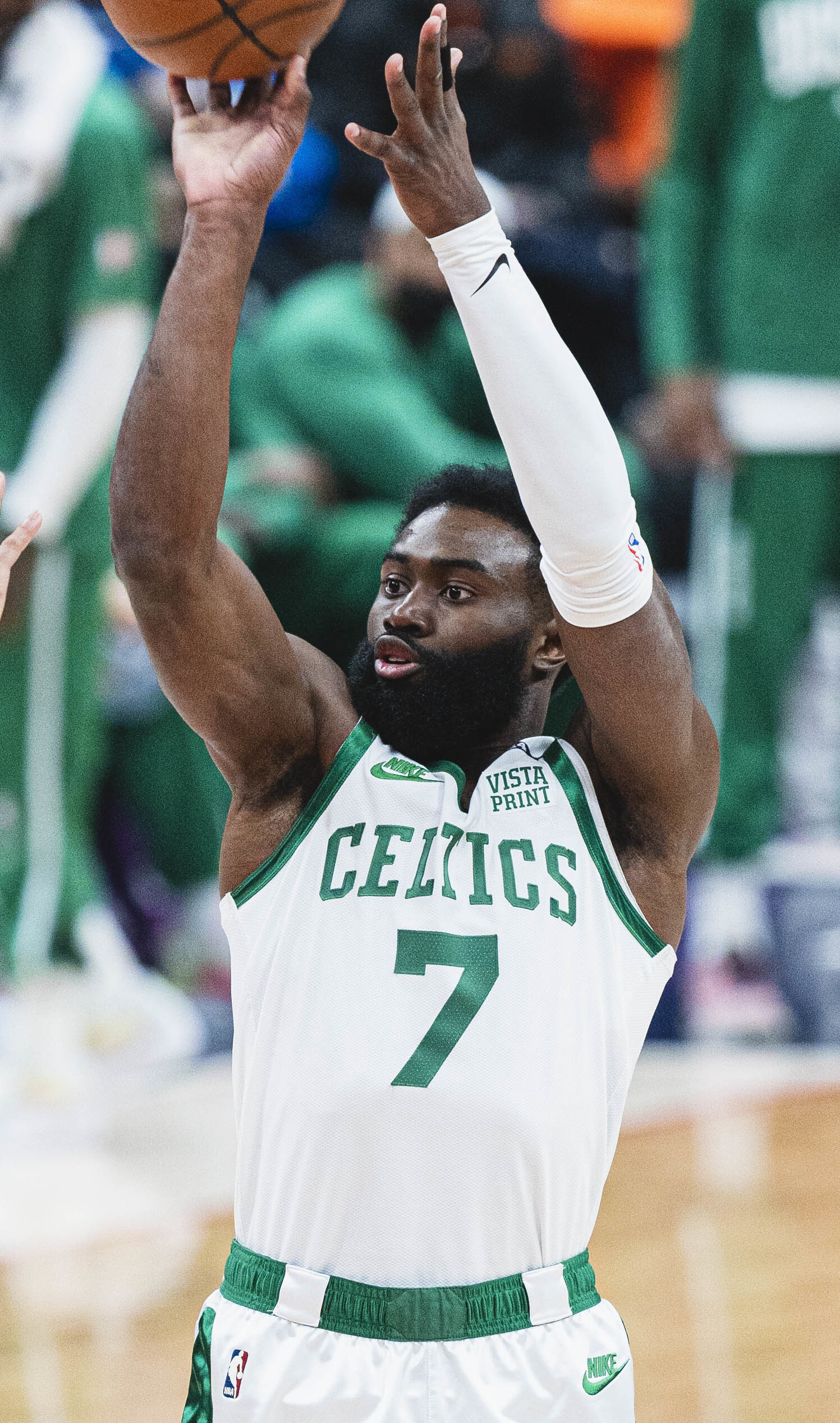
Jaylen Brown was selected third by the Boston Celtics.

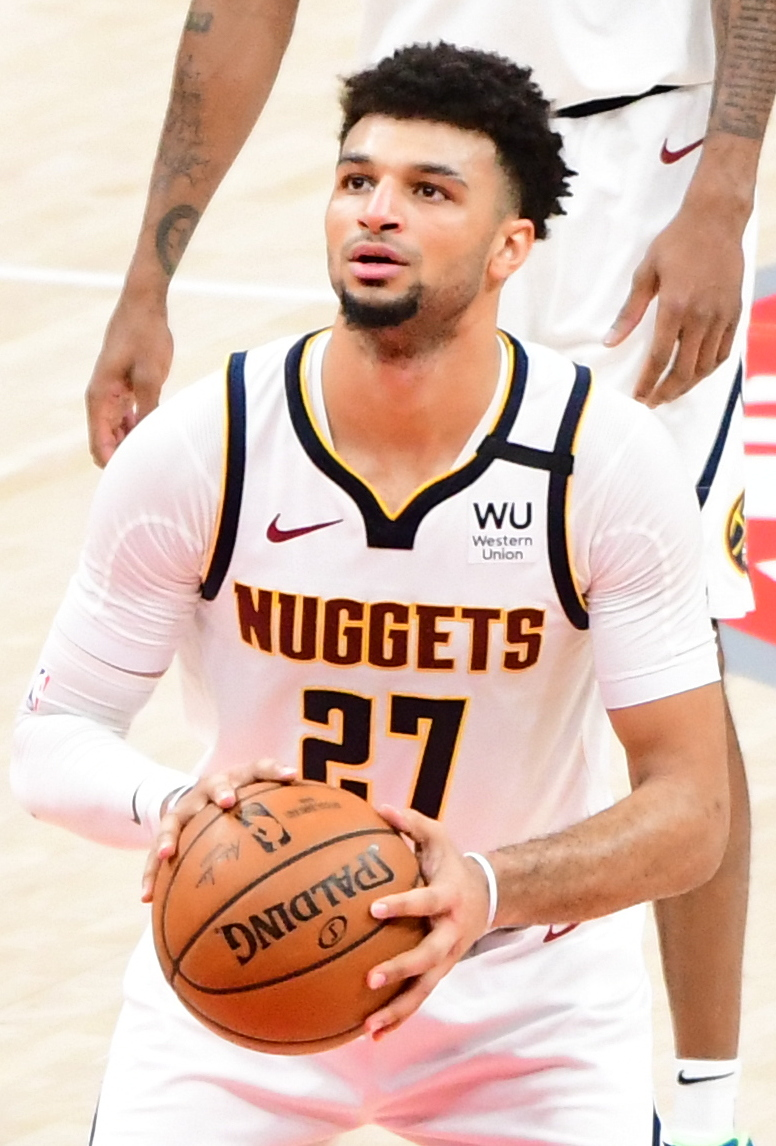
Jamal Murray was selected seventh by the Denver Nuggets.

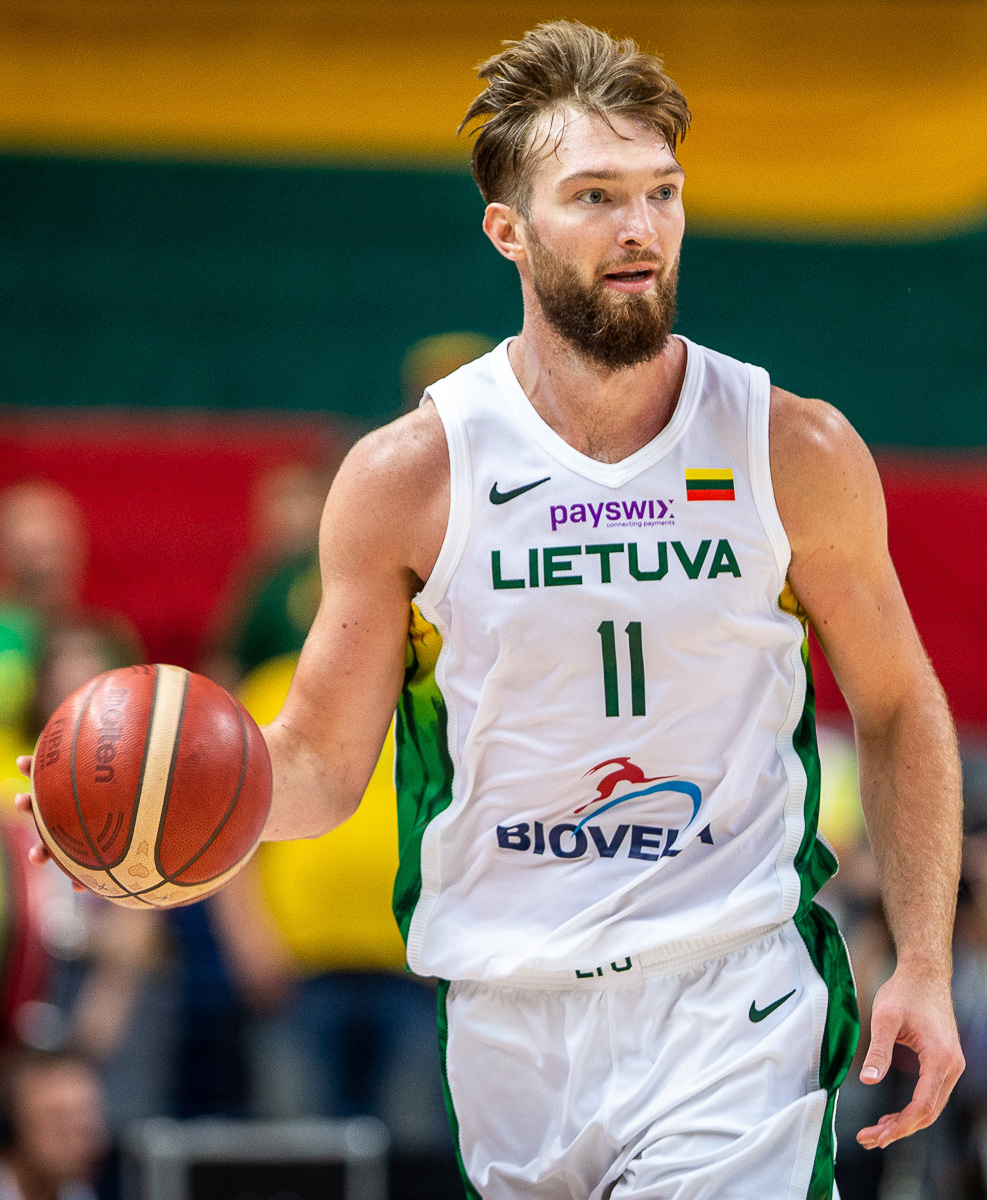
Domantas Sabonis, son of the Hall of Fame member and former international superstar Arvydas Sabonis, was selected eleventh by the Oklahoma City Thunder via the Orlando Magic.

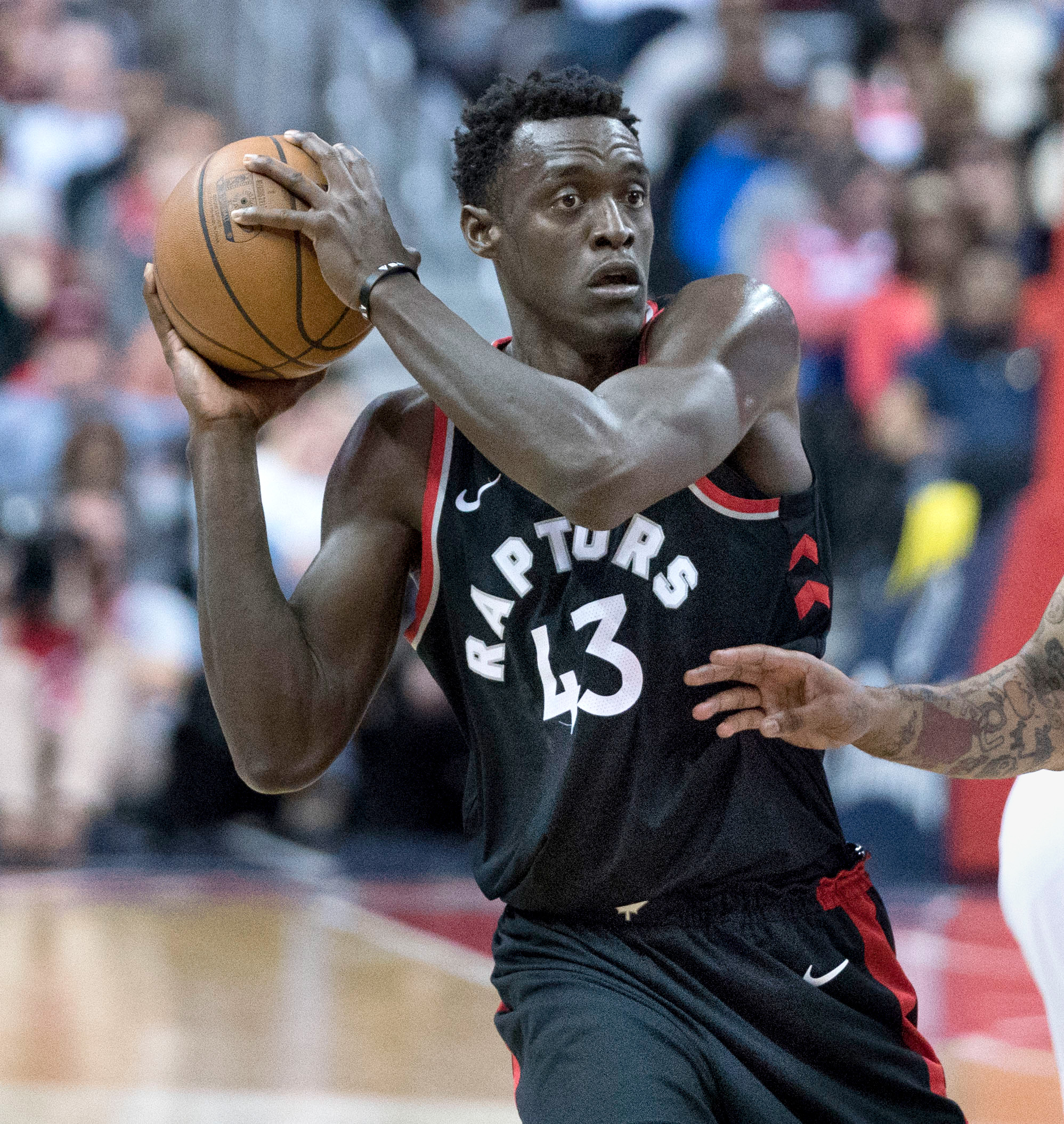
Pascal Siakam was selected 27th by the Toronto Raptors.

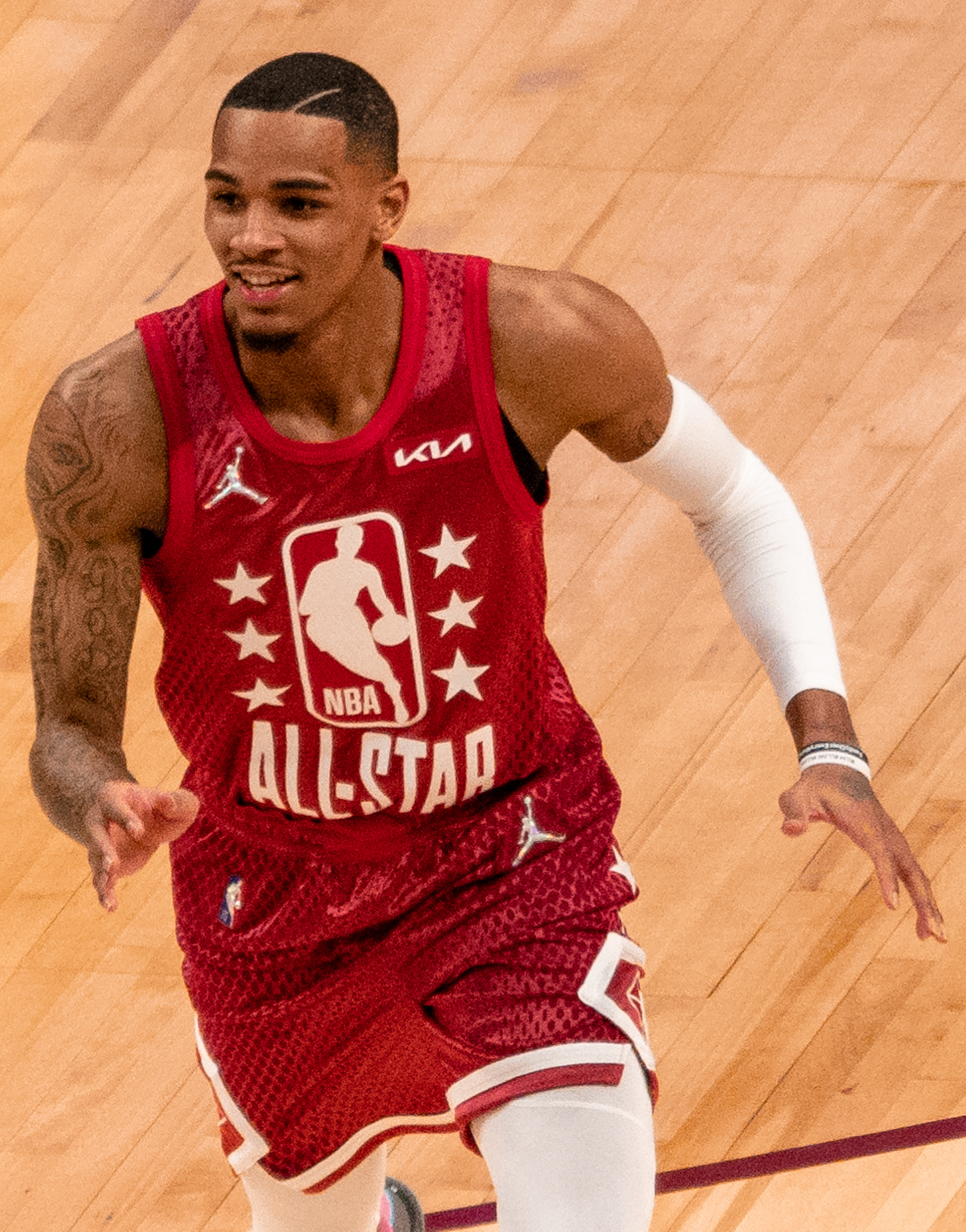
Dejounte Murray was selected 29th by the San Antonio Spurs.

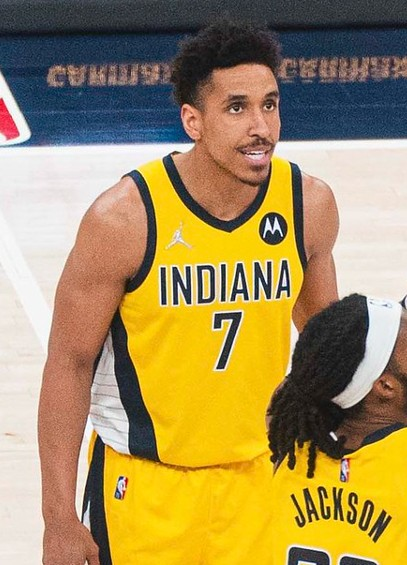
Malcolm Brogdon was selected 36th by the Milwaukee Bucks and is the only second-round selection to win NBA Rookie of the Year.

| Rnd. | Pick | Player | Pos. | Nationality (Note: Nationality indicates the player's national team or representative nationality. If a player has not competed at the international level, then the nationality indicates the national team which the player is eligible to represent according to FIBA rules.) | Team | School / club team |
|---|---|---|---|---|---|---|
| 1 | 1 | Ben Simmons^{*~} | PF/PG | Australia | Philadelphia 76ers | LSU (Fr.) |
| 1 | 2 | Brandon Ingram^{+} | SF | United States | Los Angeles Lakers | Duke (Fr.) |
| 1 | 3 | Jaylen Brown^{*} | SF/SG | United States | Boston Celtics (from Brooklyn) (Note: July 12, 2013: Brooklyn Nets to Boston Celtics: Boston acquired Gerald Wallace, Kris Humphries, Keith Bogans, MarShon Brooks, Kris Joseph, a 2014 first round pick, a 2016 first round pick, a 2018 first round pick and the option to swap 2017 first round picks; Brooklyn acquired Paul Pierce, Kevin Garnett, Jason Terry and D. J. White) | California (Fr.) |
| 1 | 4 | Dragan Bender | PF/C | Croatia (Note: Both Dragan Bender and Ivica Zubac were born in Bosnia and Herzegovina, but they represent Croatia in international competitions.) | Phoenix Suns | Maccabi Tel Aviv (Israel) |
| 1 | 5 | Kris Dunn | PG | United States | Minnesota Timberwolves | Providence (Jr.) |
| 1 | 6 | Buddy Hield | SG | Bahamas | New Orleans Pelicans | Oklahoma (Sr.) |
| 1 | 7 | Jamal Murray^{*} | PG/SG | Canada | Denver Nuggets (from New York) (Note: February 22, 2011: New York Knicks to Denver Nuggets (three-team trade): Denver acquired Wilson Chandler, Raymond Felton, Danilo Gallinari, Timofey Mozgov, a 2014 first round pick, 2012 and 2013 second round picks, the option to swap 2016 first round picks, and cash considerations from New York; Denver acquired Kosta Koufos from Minnesota; New York acquired Carmelo Anthony, Chauncey Billups, Anthony Carter, Renaldo Balkman and Shelden Williams from Denver; New York acquired Corey Brewer from Minnesota; Minnesota acquired a 2015 second round pick from Denver; Minnesota acquired Anthony Randolph, Eddy Curry and cash considerations from New York) | Kentucky (Fr.) |
| 1 | 8 | Marquese Chriss | PF | United States | Sacramento Kings (traded to Phoenix Suns) (Note: June 23, 2016: Sacramento Kings to Phoenix Suns: Phoenix acquired Sacramento's first round pick (No. 8); Sacramento acquired two of Phoenix's round picks (Nos. 13 and 28), a 2020 second round pick, and the draft rights to Bogdan Bogdanovic) | Washington (Fr.) |
| 1 | 9 | Jakob Pöltl | C | Austria | Toronto Raptors (from Denver via New York) (Note: July 10, 2013: New York Knicks to Toronto Raptors: Toronto acquired Marcus Camby, Steve Novak, Quentin Richardson, a 2016 first round pick, 2014 and 2017 second round picks; New York acquired Andrea Bargnani) | Utah (So.) |
| 1 | 10 | Thon Maker | PF | Australia (Note: Maker was born in Wau, Sudan, which would later be a part of South Sudan, but would be raised in Australia.) | Milwaukee Bucks | Orangeville Prep/Athlete Institute (Canada HS Pg.) |
| 1 | 11 | Domantas Sabonis^{*} | C/PF | Lithuania (Note: Sabonis is a citizen of both Lithuania and the United States by birth; he was born in Portland, Oregon while his father Arvydas was playing for the Portland Trail Blazers. The younger Sabonis has represented Lithuania at both youth and senior levels.) | Orlando Magic (traded to Oklahoma City Thunder) (Note: June 23, 2016: Orlando Magic to Oklahoma City Thunder: Oklahoma acquired Orlando's first round pick in the draft, Victor Oladipo and Ersan İlyasova; Orlando acquired Serge Ibaka) | Gonzaga (So.) |
| 1 | 12 | Taurean Prince | SF | United States | Utah Jazz (traded to Atlanta Hawks) (Note: June 22, 2016: Utah Jazz to Atlanta Hawks (three-team trade with Indiana Pacers): Atlanta acquired Utah's first round pick in the draft; Utah acquired George Hill from Indiana; Indiana acquired Jeff Teague from Atlanta) | Baylor (Sr.) |
| 1 | 13 | Georgios Papagiannis | C | Greece | Phoenix Suns (from Washington, (Note: February 18, 2016: Washington Wizards to Phoenix Suns: Phoenix acquired Kris Humphries, DeJuan Blair and a 2016 first round pick (protected top 9 in 2016); Wizards acquired Markieff Morris) traded to Sacramento Kings) | Panathinaikos (Greece) |
| 1 | 14 | Denzel Valentine | SG/SF | United States | Chicago Bulls | Michigan State (Sr.) |
| 1 | 15 | Juancho Hernangómez | SF/PF | Spain | Denver Nuggets (from Houston) (Note: July 20, 2015: Houston Rockets to Denver Nuggets: Denver acquired Joey Dorsey, Nick Johnson, Kostas Papanikolaou, Pablo Prigioni, a 2016 first round draft pick, and cash considerations.; Houston acquired Ty Lawson and a 2017 second round draft pick) | Movistar Estudiantes (Spain) |
| 1 | 16 | Guerschon Yabusele | PF | France (Note: Yabusele was born in France to parents from the Democratic Republic of the Congo. He holds dual citizenship and plays for the France national basketball team.) | Boston Celtics (from Dallas) (Note: December 18, 2014: Dallas Mavericks to Boston Celtics: Boston acquired Jae Crowder, Jameer Nelson, Brandan Wright, a first round pick (protected outside the top 3 plus 15th–30th in 2015, top 7 in 2016) and a 2016 second round pick; Dallas acquired Rajon Rondo and Dwight Powell) | Rouen Métropole (France) |
| 1 | 17 | Wade Baldwin | PG | United States | Memphis Grizzlies | Vanderbilt (So.) |
| 1 | 18 | Henry Ellenson | PF | United States | Detroit Pistons | Marquette (Fr.) |
| 1 | 19 | Malik Beasley | SG | United States | Denver Nuggets (from Portland) (Note: February 19, 2015: Portland Trail Blazers to Denver Nuggets: Denver acquired Will Barton, Víctor Claver, Thomas Robinson and a 2016 first round pick (protected top 14 in 2016–17); Portland acquired Arron Afflalo and Alonzo Gee) | Florida State (Fr.) |
| 1 | 20 | Caris LeVert | SG | United States | Indiana Pacers (traded to Brooklyn Nets) (Note: June 23, 2016: Indiana Pacers to Brooklyn Nets: Brooklyn acquired Indiana's first round pick and a future second round pick; Indiana acquired Thaddeus Young) | Michigan (Sr.) |
| 1 | 21 | DeAndre' Bembry | SF | United States | Atlanta Hawks | Saint Joseph's (Jr.) |
| 1 | 22 | Malachi Richardson | SG | United States | Charlotte Hornets (traded to Sacramento Kings) (Note: July 7, 2016: Charlotte Hornets to Sacramento Kings: Sacramento acquired Charlotte's first round pick; Charlotte acquired Marco Belinelli) | Syracuse (Fr.) |
| 1 | 23 | Ante Žižić | C | Croatia | Boston Celtics | KK Cibona (Croatia) |
| 1 | 24 | Timothé Luwawu-Cabarrot | SG/SF | France | Philadelphia 76ers (from Miami via Cleveland) (Note: July 9, 2010: Miami Heat to Cleveland Cavaliers: Cleveland acquired a 2011 second round pick, a 2012 second round pick, a 2013 first round pick, and a future first round pick (top 10 protected in 2015–16); Miami acquired LeBron James; August 23, 2014: Cleveland Cavaliers to Philadelphia 76ers (three-team trade with Minnesota Timberwolves): Philadelphia acquired Luc Mbah a Moute, Alexey Shved, and Miami's conditional first round pick; Cleveland acquired Kevin Love; Minnesota acquired Andrew Wiggins, Anthony Bennett, and Thaddeus Young) | Mega Leks (Serbia) |
| 1 | 25 | Brice Johnson | PF | United States | Los Angeles Clippers | North Carolina (Sr.) |
| 1 | 26 | Furkan Korkmaz | SG/SF | Turkey | Philadelphia 76ers (from Oklahoma City via Cleveland and Denver) (Note: January 5, 2015: Oklahoma City Thunder to Cleveland Cavaliers (three-team trade with New York Knicks): Cleveland acquired J. R. Smith, Iman Shumpert, a first round pick (protected top 18 in 2015, top 15 in 2016–17); Oklahoma City acquired Dion Waiters; New York acquired Lou Amundson, Alex Kirk, Lance Thomas and a 2019 second round pick; January 7, 2015: Cleveland Cavaliers to Denver Nuggets: Denver acquired Oklahoma City's conditional first round pick and a future first round pick; Cleveland acquired Timofey Mozgov and a 2015 second round pick; February 19, 2015: Denver Nuggets to Philadelphia 76ers: Philadelphia acquired JaVale McGee, draft rights to Chukwudiebere Maduabum and Oklahoma City's conditional first round pick; Denver acquired draft rights to Cenk Akyol) | Anadolu Efes (Turkey) |
| 1 | 27 | Pascal Siakam^{*} | PF | Cameroon | Toronto Raptors | New Mexico State (So.) |
| 1 | 28 | Skal Labissière | PF/C | Haiti | Phoenix Suns (from Cleveland via Boston (Note: July 10, 2014: Cleveland Cavaliers to Boston Celtics (three-team trade with Brooklyn Nets): Boston acquired Marcus Thornton, Tyler Zeller, and a first round pick (top 10 protected 2016–18); Cleveland acquired the draft rights to Ilkan Karaman, Christian Drejer and Edin Bavcic; Brooklyn acquired Jarrett Jack and Sergey Karasev; February 19, 2015: Boston Celtics to Phoenix Suns, Phoenix acquired Marcus Thornton and Cleveland's conditional first round pick; Boston acquired Isaiah Thomas) traded to Sacramento Kings) | Kentucky (Fr.) |
| 1 | 29 | Dejounte Murray^{+} | PG/SG | United States | San Antonio Spurs | Washington (Fr.) |
| 1 | 30 | Damian Jones | C | United States | Golden State Warriors | Vanderbilt (Jr.) |
| 2 | 31 | Deyonta Davis | PF/C | United States | Boston Celtics (from Philadelphia via Miami (Note: June 28, 2012: Philadelphia 76ers to Miami Heat, Miami acquired draft rights to Justin Hamilton and a conditional future first round pick (protected top 14 in 2013–2015, else 2015 and 2016 second round picks); Philadelphia acquired draft rights to Arnett Moultrie; January 15, 2014: Miami Heat to Boston Celtics (three-team trade with Golden State Warriors): Boston acquired Joel Anthony, Philadelphia's conditional first round pick, a 2016 second round pick from Miami and cash considerations; Miami acquired Toney Douglas from Golden State; Golden State acquired Jordan Crawford and MarShon Brooks from Boston) traded to Memphis Grizzlies (Note: June 23, 2016: Boston Celtics to Memphis Grizzlies: Memphis acquired draft rights to the No. 31st pick (Davis) and the No. 35th pick (Zagorac); Boston acquired a 2019 first round pick)) | Michigan State (Fr.) |
| 2 | 32 | Ivica Zubac | C | Croatia | Los Angeles Lakers | Mega Leks (Serbia) |
| 2 | 33 | Cheick Diallo | PF/C | Mali | Los Angeles Clippers (from Brooklyn, (Note: July 11, 2012: Los Angeles Clippers to Brooklyn Nets: Brooklyn acquired Reggie Evans; L.A. Clippers acquired the option to swap 2016 second round picks (in the event the Clippers' pick is at or above the 55th selection)) traded to New Orleans Pelicans (Note: June 23, 2016: Los Angeles Clippers to New Orleans Pelicans: New Orleans acquired Los Angeles' 2016 second round pick (Diallo); L.A. Clippers acquired the draft rights of New Orleans' 39th (Michineau) and 40th (Stone) picks)) | Kansas (Fr.) |
| 2 | 34 | Tyler Ulis | PG | United States | Phoenix Suns | Kentucky (So.) |
| 2 | 35 | Rade Zagorac^{#} | SG/SF | Serbia | Boston Celtics (from Minnesota via New Orleans and Phoenix, (Note: July 13, 2012: Minnesota Timberwolves to New Orleans Hornets (now Pelicans): New Orleans acquired the rights to Brad Miller's expiring contract, the 2013 second round pick, and a 2016 second round pick; Minnesota acquired a Top 55 protected 2017 second round pick; July 27, 2012: New Orleans Hornets (now Pelicans) to Phoenix Suns (three-team trade with Minnesota): Phoenix acquired Wesley Johnson and a protected first round pick (Top-13 for 2013–2014, Top-12 for 2015–2016) that converts to two second round picks in 2016 and 2017 from Minnesota; Phoenix acquired the rights to Brad Miller's expiring contract and the expiring contract of Jerome Dyson from New Orleans; New Orleans acquired Robin Lopez, Hakim Warrick, and cash considerations from Phoenix; Minnesota reacquired the 2013 second round pick they got back from New Orleans in their earlier trade and acquired a 2016 second round pick from New Orleans; Minnesota acquired a 2014 second round pick from Phoenix (via the Los Angeles Lakers); January 9, 2015: Phoenix Suns to Boston Celtics: Boston acquired a Top 12 protected first round pick from 2015 and 2016 that converts to two second round picks in 2016 and 2017 from Phoenix via Minnesota; Phoenix acquired Brandan Wright) traded to Memphis Grizzlies) | Mega Leks (Serbia) |
| 2 | 36 | Malcolm Brogdon^{~} | PG/SG | United States | Milwaukee Bucks (from New Orleans via Sacramento) (Note: July 10, 2013: New Orleans Pelicans to Sacramento Kings (three-team trade with Portland Trail Blazers): Sacramento acquired a 2016 second round pick (with an option to swap with New Orleans) and a 2018 second round pick from Portland; Sacramento acquired Greivis Vásquez from New Orleans; New Orleans acquired Tyreke Evans from Sacramento; New Orleans acquired the draft rights to Jeff Withey from Portland; Portland acquired Robin Lopez and Terrel Harris from New Orleans; July 13, 2013: Sacramento Kings to Milwaukee Bucks: Sacramento acquired Luc Mbah a Moute; Milwaukee acquired the more favorable 2016 second round pick between Sacramento and New Orleans, the rights to swap 2019 second round picks, and future considerations) | Virginia (Sr.) |
| 2 | 37 | Chinanu Onuaku | PF/C | United States | Houston Rockets (from New York via Portland and Sacramento) (Note: July 15, 2012: New York Knicks to Portland Trail Blazers: Portland acquired Jared Jeffries, Dan Gadzuric, the draft rights to Kostas Papanikolaou and Georgios Printezis, and their 2016 second round pick; New York acquired Raymond Felton and Kurt Thomas; July 10, 2013: Portland Trail Blazers to Sacramento Kings (three-team trade with New Orleans Pelicans): Sacramento acquired a 2016 second round pick (with an option to swap picks with New Orleans) and a 2018 second round pick from Portland; Sacramento acquired Greivis Vásquez from New Orleans; Portland acquired Robin Lopez and Terrel Harris from New Orleans; New Orleans acquired Tyreke Evans from Sacramento; New Orleans acquired the draft rights to Jeff Withey from Portland; September 17, 2014: Sacramento Kings to Houston Rockets: Houston acquired Jason Terry, a 2015 second round pick and a 2016 second round pick; Sacramento acquired Alonzo Gee, Scotty Hopson, and a trade exception) | Louisville (So.) |
| 2 | 38 | Patrick McCaw | SG/SF | United States | Milwaukee Bucks (traded to Golden State Warriors) (Note: June 23, 2016: Milwaukee Bucks to Golden State Warriors: Golden State acquired Milwaukee's second round pick; Milwaukee acquired cash considerations) | UNLV (So.) |
| 2 | 39 | David Michineau^{#} | PG | France (Note: Michineau was born in Guadeloupe, a French possession in the Caribbean. It is an overseas department with the same political status as departments within metropolitan France.) | New Orleans Pelicans (from Denver via Philadelphia, (Note: February 20, 2014: Washington Wizards to Philadelphia 76ers (three-team trade with Denver Nuggets): Philadelphia acquired Eric Maynor and New Orleans' 2015 second round pick from Washington; Philadelphia acquired a 2016 second round pick from Denver; Washington acquired a conditional 2014 second round pick from Philadelphia; Washington acquired Andre Miller from Denver; Denver acquired Jan Veselý from Washington; December 24, 2015: Philadelphia 76ers to New Orleans Pelicans: Philadelphia acquired Ish Smith; New Orleans acquired two future second round picks) traded to Los Angeles Clippers) | Élan Chalon (France) |
| 2 | 40 | Diamond Stone | C | United States | New Orleans Pelicans (from Sacramento, (Note: July 10, 2013: Sacramento Kings to New Orleans Pelicans (three-team trade with Portland Trail Blazers): Sacramento acquired a 2016 second round pick (with an option to swap with New Orleans' pick) and a 2018 second round pick from Portland; Sacramento acquired Greivis Vásquez from New Orleans; New Orleans acquired Tyreke Evans from Sacramento; New Orleans acquired the draft rights to Jeff Withey from Portland; Portland acquired Robin Lopez and Terrel Harris from New Orleans) traded to Los Angeles Clippers) | Maryland (Fr.) |
| 2 | 41 | Stephen Zimmerman | PF/C | United States | Orlando Magic | UNLV (Fr.) |
| 2 | 42 | Isaiah Whitehead | PG/SG | United States | Utah Jazz (traded to Brooklyn Nets) (Note: June 23, 2016: Utah Jazz to Brooklyn Nets: Brooklyn acquired Utah's 2016 second round pick (Whitehead); Utah acquired Brooklyn's 2016 second round pick (Paige)) | Seton Hall (So.) |
| 2 | 43 | Zhou Qi | C | China | Houston Rockets | Xinjiang Flying Tigers (China) |
| 2 | 44 | Isaïa Cordinier^{#} | SG | France | Atlanta Hawks (from Washington) (Note: June 25, 2015: Washington Wizards to Atlanta Hawks: Atlanta acquired the draft rights to Jerian Grant, a 2016 second round pick, and a 2019 second round pick; Washington acquired the draft rights to Kelly Oubre Jr.) | ASC Denain-Voltaire (France) |
| 2 | 45 | Demetrius Jackson | PG | United States | Boston Celtics (from Memphis via Denver and Dallas) (Note: August 7, 2009: Memphis Grizzlies to Denver Nuggets: Denver acquired a Top 55 protected 2016 second round pick (protection was later removed for Memphis to acquire Nick Calathes in a later trade in 2013) and a trade exception; Memphis acquired Steven Hunter, a protected 2010 first round pick, and cash; December 13, 2011: Denver Nuggets to Dallas Mavericks: Dallas acquired a Top 55 protected 2016 second round pick (protection was later removed in 2013 due to the aforementioned trade with Memphis mentioned above); Denver acquired Rudy Fernández and Corey Brewer; December 18, 2014: Dallas Mavericks to Boston Celtics: Boston acquired Jae Crowder, Jameer Nelson, Brandan Wright, a Top-7 protected 2016 first round pick, and the more favorable of Dallas and Memphis' 2016 second round picks; Dallas acquired Rajon Rondo and Dwight Powell) | Notre Dame (Jr.) |
| 2 | 46 | A. J. Hammons | C | United States | Dallas Mavericks | Purdue (Sr.) |
| 2 | 47 | Jake Layman | SF | United States | Orlando Magic (from Chicago, (Note: July 14, 2014: Chicago Bulls to Orlando Magic: Orlando acquired Anthony Randolph, the 2015 second round pick of either Chicago or Denver, and the 2016 second round pick of either Chicago or Portland; Chicago acquired the player rights of Milovan Raković) traded to Portland Trail Blazers (Note: June 23, 2016: Orlando Magic to Portland Trail Blazers: Portland acquired Orlando's 2016 second round pick (Layman); Orlando acquired a 2019 second round pick and cash considerations)) | Maryland (Sr.) |
| 2 | 48 | Paul Zipser | SG/SF | Germany | Chicago Bulls (from Portland via Cleveland) (Note: June 27, 2013: Portland Trail Blazers to Cleveland Cavaliers: Cleveland acquired a 2015 second round pick and a 2016 second round pick; Portland acquired the draft rights of Allen Crabbe; January 6, 2014: Cleveland Cavaliers to Chicago Bulls: Chicago acquired the player rights to Andrew Bynum, a protected first round pick from Sacramento, a conditional option to swap 2015 first round draft picks, and 2015 and 2016 second round picks from Portland; Cleveland acquired Luol Deng) | Bayern Munich (Germany) |
| 2 | 49 | Michael Gbinije | SF | Nigeria (Note: Michael Gbinije was born in the United States, but had represented Nigeria internationally in competitions since 2015.) | Detroit Pistons | Syracuse (Sr.) |
| 2 | 50 | Georges Niang | PF | United States | Indiana Pacers | Iowa State (Sr.) |
| 2 | 51 | Ben Bentil | PF | Ghana | Boston Celtics (from Miami) (Note: January 15, 2014: Miami Heat to Boston Celtics (three-team trade with Golden State Warriors): Boston acquired Joel Anthony and a 2016 second round pick from Miami; Boston acquired a conditional, lottery first round pick from Golden State via Philadelphia that wound up being a 2015 second round pick; Miami acquired Toney Douglas from Golden State; Golden State acquired Jordan Crawford and MarShon Brooks from Boston) | Providence (So.) |
| 2 | 52 | Joel Bolomboy | PF/C | Ukraine (Note: Bolomboy was born in Ukraine to a Russian mother and raised in the United States. He possessed Ukrainian and American citizenship when he acquired Russian citizenship in 2018. Bolomboy plays for the Russia national basketball team.) | Utah Jazz (from Boston via Memphis) (Note: January 7, 2014: Boston Celtics to Memphis Grizzlies (three-team trade with Oklahoma City Thunder): Memphis acquired Courtney Lee and a 2016 second round pick from Boston; Memphis acquired cash considerations from Oklahoma City; Boston acquired Jerryd Bayless from Memphis; Boston acquired Ryan Gomes from Oklahoma City; Oklahoma City acquired conditional 2014 and 2017 second round picks from Memphis; June 26, 2014: Memphis Grizzlies to Utah Jazz: Utah acquired the more favorable 2016 second round pick between the Boston Celtics and the Toronto Raptors from Memphis; Memphis acquired the draft rights of Jarnell Stokes from Utah) | Weber State (Sr.) |
| 2 | 53 | Petr Cornelie | PF | France (Note: Cornelie was born in France to a Czech mother. He holds dual citizenship and plays for the France national basketball team.) | Denver Nuggets (from Charlotte via Oklahoma City) (Note: June 25, 2015: Charlotte Hornets to Oklahoma City Thunder: Oklahoma City acquired Luke Ridnour and a No. 56–60 protected 2016 second round pick from Charlotte; Charlotte acquired Jeremy Lamb from Oklahoma City; February 18, 2016: Oklahoma City Thunder to Denver Nuggets: Denver acquired D. J. Augustin, Steve Novak, two 2016 second round picks, and cash considerations from Oklahoma City; Oklahoma City acquired Randy Foye) | Le Mans Sarthe (France) |
| 2 | 54 | Kay Felder | PG | United States | Atlanta Hawks (traded to Cleveland Cavaliers) (Note: June 23, 2016: Atlanta Hawks to Cleveland Cavaliers: Cleveland acquired Atlanta's 2016 second round pick (Felder); Atlanta received cash considerations) | Oakland (Jr.) |
| 2 | 55 | Marcus Paige | PG | United States | Brooklyn Nets (from L.A. Clippers, traded to Utah Jazz) | North Carolina (Sr.) |
| 2 | 56 | Daniel Hamilton | SG/SF | United States | Denver Nuggets (from Oklahoma City, traded to Oklahoma City Thunder (Note: June 23, 2016: Denver Nuggets to Oklahoma City Thunder: Oklahoma City re-acquired Denver's second round pick (Hamilton); Denver received cash considerations)) | Connecticut (So.) |
| 2 | 57 | Wang Zhelin^{#} | C | China | Memphis Grizzlies (from Toronto) (Note: July 9, 2009: Toronto Raptors to Memphis Grizzlies (four-team trade with the Orlando Magic and Dallas Mavericks): Memphis acquired a 2016 second round pick and cash considerations from Toronto; Memphis acquired Jerry Stackhouse from Dallas; Toronto acquired Hedo Türkoğlu from Orlando; Toronto acquired Devean George and Antoine Wright from Dallas; Orlando acquired cash considerations from both Toronto and Dallas; Dallas acquired Shawn Marion, Kris Humphries, and Nathan Jawai from Toronto; Dallas acquired Greg Buckner from Memphis) | Fujian Sturgeons (China) |
| 2 | 58 | Abdel Nader | SF | Egypt (Note: Nader was born in Egypt and raised in the United States. He holds dual citizenship and plays for the Egypt national basketball team.) | Boston Celtics (from Cleveland) (Note: September 25, 2014: Cleveland Cavaliers to Boston Celtics: Boston acquired Dwight Powell, John Lucas III, Erik Murphy, Malcolm Thomas, a 2016 second round pick, a 2017 second round pick, and a trade exception from Cleveland; Cleveland acquired Keith Bogans, a Top 55 protected 2015 second round pick, and a Top 55 protected 2017 second round pick from Boston) | Iowa State (Sr.) |
| 2 | 59 | Isaiah Cousins^{#} | PG/SG | United States | Sacramento Kings (from San Antonio) (Note: July 9, 2015: San Antonio Spurs to Sacramento Kings: Sacramento acquired a 2016 second round pick from San Antonio; San Antonio acquired Ray McCallum Jr. to Sacramento) | Oklahoma (Sr.) |
| 2 | 60 | Tyrone Wallace | PG | United States | Utah Jazz (from Golden State) (Note: July 10, 2013: Golden State Warriors to Utah Jazz (three-team trade with Denver Nuggets): Utah acquired Andris Biedriņš, Richard Jefferson, Brandon Rush, 2014 & 2017 first round picks, a 2016 second round pick, a 2017 second round pick, and cash considerations from Golden State; Utah acquired a 2018 second round pick from Denver; Golden State acquired Kevin Murphy from Utah; Golden State acquired Andre Iguodala from Denver; Denver acquired a 2018 second round pick from Golden State; Denver acquired Randy Foye from Utah) | California (Sr.) |

== Notable undrafted players ==
These players were not selected in the 2016 NBA draft, but have appeared in at least one regular-season or playoff game in the NBA.

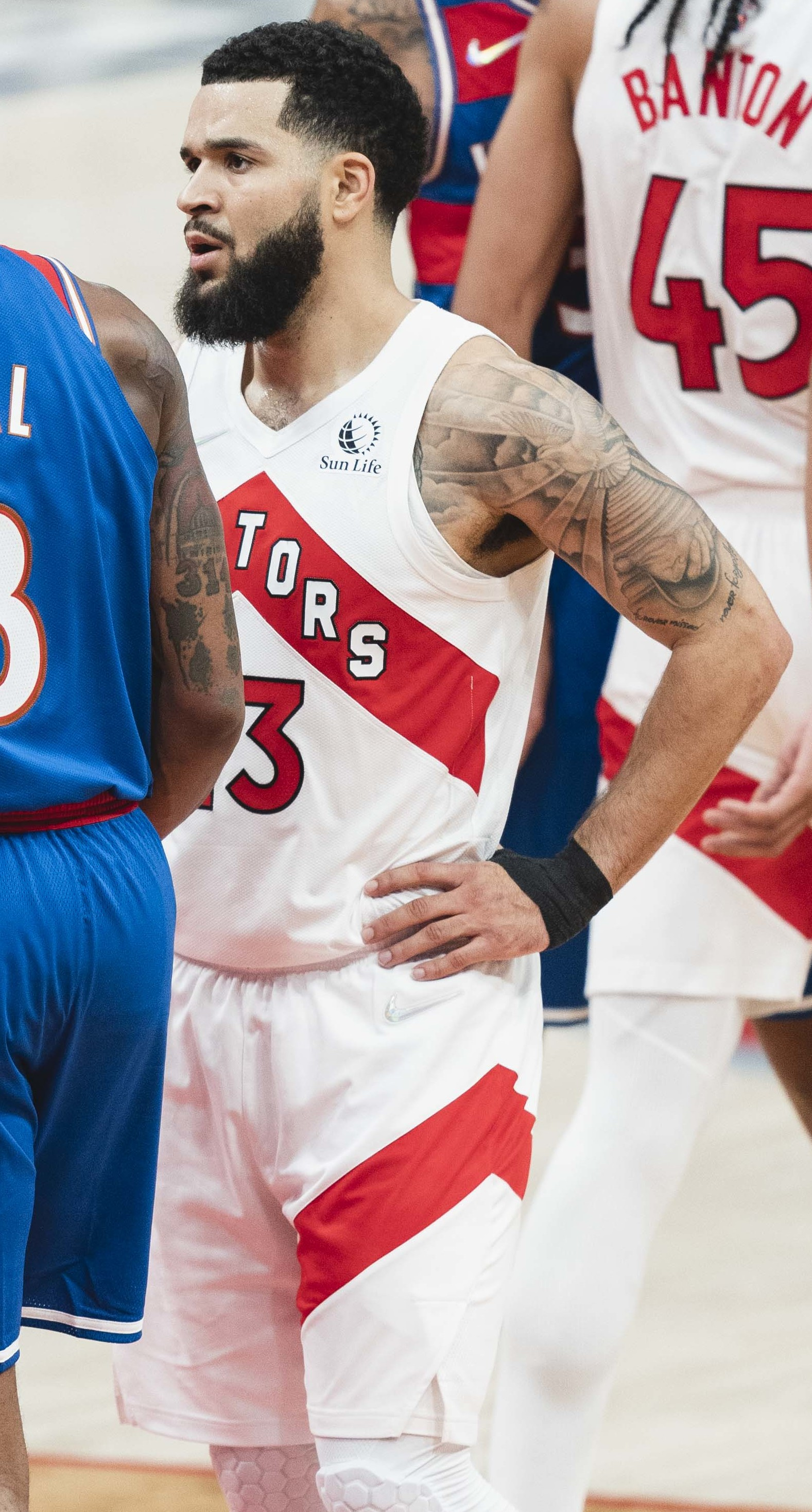
Fred VanVleet went undrafted and was selected as an NBA All-Star in 2022.

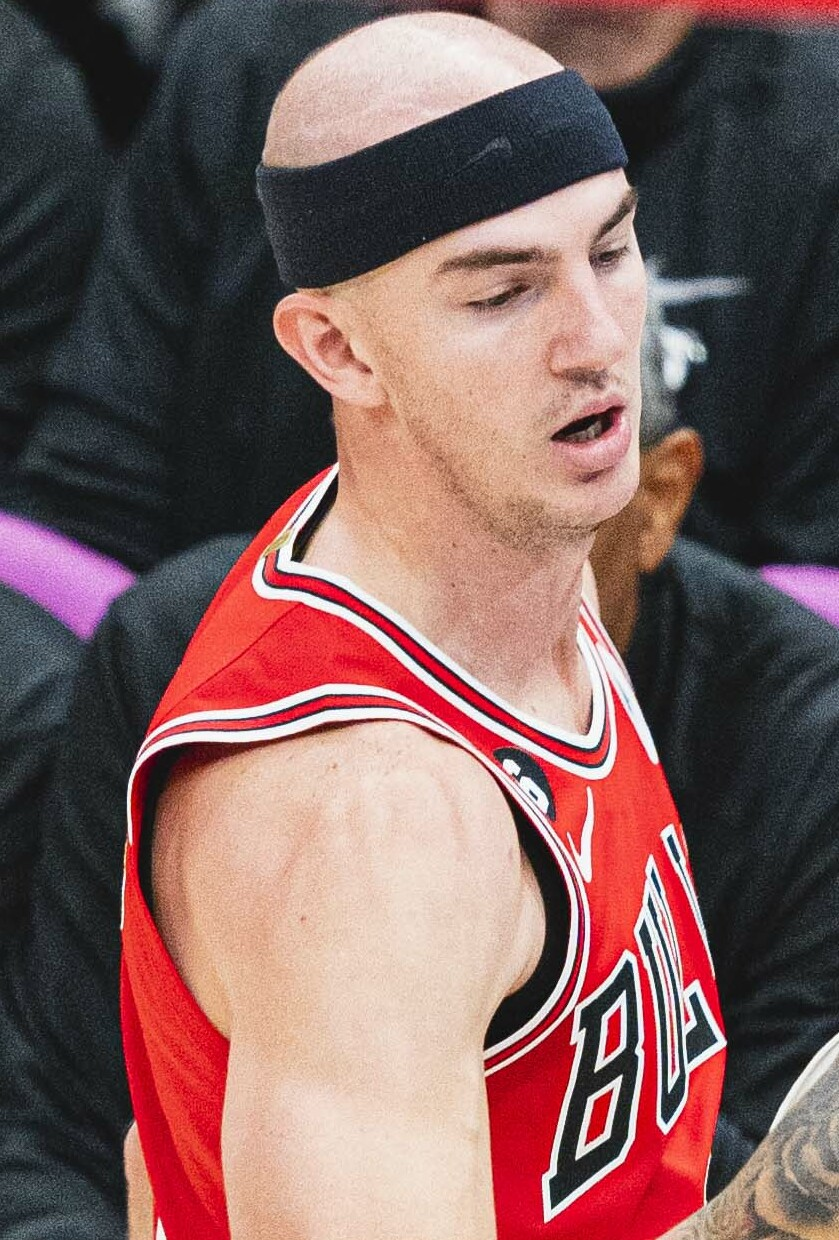
Alex Caruso went undrafted and was selected to the NBA All-Defensive Team in 2023 and 2024.

| Player | Pos. | Nationality | School/club team |
|---|---|---|---|
| DeVaughn Akoon-Purcell | SG/SF | United States; Trinidad and Tobago (Note: Akoon-Purcell is a dual citizen of the United States and Trinidad and Tobago. He has not played for either country's national team.) | Illinois State (Sr.) |
| Ryan Arcidiacono | PG | United States | Villanova (Sr.) |
| Ron Baker | SG/PG | United States | Wichita State (Sr.) |
| Cat Barber | PG | United States | NC State (Jr.) |
| Alex Caruso | SG | United States | Texas A&M (Sr.) |
| Kyle Collinsworth | PG | United States | BYU (Sr.) |
| Matt Costello | PF/C | United States (Note: Costello was granted Ivorian citizenship in 2021 and plays for the Ivory Coast national basketball team.) | Michigan State (Sr.) |
| Yogi Ferrell | PG | United States | Indiana (Sr.) |
| Dorian Finney-Smith | SF | United States | Florida (Sr.) |
| Bryn Forbes | PG | United States | Michigan State (Sr.) |
| Patricio Garino | SG/SF | Argentina (Note: Garino is a dual citizen of Argentina and Italy. He plays for the Argentina national basketball team.) | George Washington (Sr.) |
| Marcus Georges-Hunt | SG | United States | Georgia Tech (Sr.) |
| Anthony Gill | PF | United States | Virginia (Sr.) |
| Josh Gray | PG | United States | LSU (Sr.) |
| Shaquille Harrison | PG | United States | Tulsa (Sr.) |
| Myke Henry | SG/SF | United States | DePaul (Sr.) |
| Danuel House | SG | United States | Texas A&M (Sr.) |
| Derrick Jones Jr. | SF | United States | UNLV (Fr.) |
| Jalen Jones | SF | United States | Texas A&M (Sr.) |
| Damion Lee | SG | United States | Louisville (Sr.) |
| Shawn Long | PF | United States | Louisiana–Lafayette (Sr.) |
| Jordan Loyd | PG/SG | United States | Indianapolis (Sr.) |
| Gabriel Lundberg | PG | Denmark | Horsens Idræts Club (Denmark) |
| Sheldon McClellan | SG | United States | Miami (Florida) (Sr.) |
| David Nwaba | SG | United States | Cal Poly (Sr.) |
| Daniel Ochefu | PF | Nigeria (Note: Ochefu is a dual citizen of Nigeria and the United States. He plays for the Nigeria national basketball team.) | Villanova (Sr.) |
| Jaysean Paige | PG | Puerto Rico (Note: Paige was born in the United States. He plays for the Puerto Rico national basketball team.) | West Virginia (Sr.) |
| Gary Payton II | PG | United States | Oregon State (Sr.) |
| Marshall Plumlee | C | United States | Duke (Sr.) |
| Alex Poythress | SF/PF | United States (Note: Poythress acquired Ivorian citizenship in 2022 and plays for the Ivory Coast national basketball team.) | Kentucky (Sr.) |
| Tim Quarterman | PG/SG | United States | LSU (Jr.) |
| Wayne Selden Jr. | PG/SG | United States | Kansas (Jr.) |
| Craig Sword | SG | United States | Mississippi State (Sr.) |
| Isaiah Taylor | PG | United States | Texas (Jr.) |
| Mike Tobey | C | United States (Note: Tobey acquired Slovenian citizenship in 2021 and plays for the Slovenia men's national basketball team.) | Virginia (Sr.) |
| Jarrod Uthoff | PF | United States | Iowa (Sr.) |
| Fred VanVleet^{+} | PG | United States | Wichita State (Sr.) |
| Jameel Warney | PF | United States | Stony Brook (Sr.) |
| James Webb III | SF | United States | Boise State (Jr.) |
| Troy Williams | SF | United States | Indiana (Jr.) |
| Kyle Wiltjer | PF/SF | Canada (Note: Wiltjer was born in the United States to a Canadian father. He holds dual citizenship and plays for the Canada national basketball team.) | Gonzaga (Sr.) |
| Gabe York | PG/SG | United States | Arizona (Sr.) |

== Eligibility and entrants ==
The draft is conducted under the eligibility rules established in the league's 2011 collective bargaining agreement (CBA) with its players union. The CBA that ended the 2011 lockout instituted no immediate changes to the draft, but called for a committee of owners and players to discuss future changes.

- All drafted players must be at least 19 years old during the calendar year of the draft. In terms of dates, players, who are eligible for the 2016 draft, must be born on or before December 31, 1997.
- On January 13, 2016, the NCAA Division I council approved a new rule for that division that significantly changed the draft landscape for college players:
  - Declaration for the draft no longer results in automatic loss of college eligibility. As long as a player does not sign a contract with a professional team outside the NBA, or sign with an agent, he will retain college eligibility as long as he makes a timely withdrawal from the draft.
  - NCAA players now have until 10 days after the end of the NBA Draft Combine to withdraw from the draft. For 2016, the withdrawal date was May 25, about five weeks after the previous mid-April deadline.
  - NCAA players may participate in the draft combine, and will also be allowed to attend one tryout per year with each NBA team without losing college eligibility.
  - NCAA players may now enter and withdraw from the draft multiple times without loss of eligibility. Previously, the NCAA treated a second declaration of draft eligibility as a permanent loss of college eligibility.

The NBA has since expanded the draft combine to include players with remaining college eligibility (who, like players without college eligibility, can only attend by invitation).

=== Early entrants ===
Player who are not automatically eligible must declare their eligibility for the draft by notifying the NBA offices in writing no later than 60 days before the draft. For the 2016 draft, this date fell on April 24. After this date "early entry" players may attend NBA pre-draft camps and individual team workouts to show off their skills and obtain feedback regarding their draft positions. Under the CBA a player may withdraw his name from consideration from the draft at any time before the final declaration date, which is 10 days before the draft. Under newly implemented NCAA rules, players had until May 25 (10 days after the draft combine) to withdraw from the draft and retain college eligibility.

A player who has hired an agent will forfeit his remaining college eligibility regardless of whether he is drafted. The CBA allows a player to withdraw from the draft twice; the 2016 NCAA rule change brought it in line with the CBA on this detail.

==== College underclassmen ====
A record-high 162 under-classed draft prospects had declared themselves for eligibility at the April 24 deadline (116 of them being from college), although college players who had not hired agents or signed professional contracts outside the NBA were able to decide to return to college by May 25, 10 days after the end of the NBA Draft Combine. At the end of the May 25 deadline, there were 57 players confirming their intentions of returning to school, thus leaving the grand total of underclassmen participating in the NBA draft as 59. Players listed in this region have publicly indicated that they have hired agents, planned to do so around this time, or made themselves their own agents; those who have hired agents and weren't drafted are deemed ineligible to return to NCAA basketball in 2016–17. However, with this year's draft class, it provided the most undrafted college underclassmen out there with 30 people there not being taken at all.

- (Hungary) Rosco Allen – F, Stanford (junior)
- (United States) Tony Anderson – F, Southeast Missouri State (freshman)
- (United States) Wade Baldwin IV – G, Vanderbilt (sophomore)
- (United States) Cat Barber – G, NC State (junior)
- (United States) Malik Beasley – G/F, Florida State (freshman)
- (United States) DeAndre' Bembry – G/F, Saint Joseph's (junior)
- (Ghana) Ben Bentil – F, Providence (sophomore)
- (United States) Jaylen Brown – F, California (freshman)
- (United States) Lamous Brown – C, USU Eastern (sophomore)
- (United States) Kareem Canty – G, Auburn (junior)
- (United States) Robert Carter Jr. – F, Maryland (junior)
- (United States) Marquese Chriss – F, Washington (freshman)
- (United States) Deyonta Davis – F, Michigan State (freshman)
- (Mali) Cheick Diallo – F/C, Kansas (freshman)
- (United States) Kris Dunn – G, Providence (junior)
- (United States) Henry Ellenson – F, Marquette (freshman)
- (United States) Kay Felder – G, Oakland (junior)
- (United States) Brannen Greene – G/F, Kansas (junior)
- (United States) Daniel Hamilton – G/F, Connecticut (sophomore)
- (Cameroon) Cedric Happi Noube – F, Virginia Union (junior)
- (United States) Jordan Hare – F, Rhode Island (junior)
- (United States) Brandon Ingram – F, Duke (freshman)
- (United States) Demetrius Jackson – G, Notre Dame (junior)
- (United States) Julian Jacobs – G, USC (junior)
- (Serbia) / (Canada) Stefan Janković – F, Hawaii (junior)
- (United States) Anthony January – F, Cal State San Bernardino (junior)
- (United States) Damian Jones – F/C, Vanderbilt (junior)
- (United States) Derrick Jones Jr. – F, UNLV (freshman)
- (Serbia) Nikola Jovanović – C, USC (junior)
- (Haiti) Skal Labissière – F/C, Kentucky (freshman)
- (United States) Jermaine Lawrence – F, Manhattan (sophomore)
- (South Sudan) / (Australia) Thon Maker – F/C, Orangeville Prep/Athlete Institute (postgraduate)
- (South Sudan) / (Australia) Emmanuel Malou – F/C, Yuba College (sophomore)
- (United States) Patrick McCaw – G, UNLV (sophomore)
- (United States) Zak McLaughlin – F/C, Gadsden State CC (freshman)
- (United States) Dejounte Murray – G, Washington (freshman)
- (Canada) Jamal Murray – G, Kentucky (freshman)
- (Senegal) Mamadou N'Diaye – C, UC Irvine (junior)
- (Nigeria) Chris Obekpa – F, UNLV (junior)
- (United States) Goodluck Okonoboh – C, UNLV (sophomore)
- (United States) Chinanu Onuaku – F, Louisville (sophomore)
- (Austria) Jakob Poeltl – C, Utah (sophomore)
- (United States) Tim Quarterman – G, LSU (junior)
- (United States) Jalen Reynolds – F, Xavier (junior)
- (United States) Malachi Richardson – G, Syracuse (freshman)
- (Lithuania) Domantas Sabonis – F/C, Gonzaga (sophomore)
- (United States) Wayne Selden Jr. – G, Kansas (junior)
- (Cameroon) Ingrid Sewa – F/C, Arizona Western College (sophomore)
- (Cameroon) Pascal Siakam – F, New Mexico State (sophomore)
- (Australia) Ben Simmons – F, LSU (freshman)
- (United States) Diamond Stone – C, Maryland (freshman)
- (United States) Isaiah Taylor – G, Texas (junior)
- (United States) Tyler Ulis – G, Kentucky (sophomore)
- (United States) Aaron Valdes – G, Hawaii (junior)
- (United States) James Webb III – F, Boise State (junior)
- (United States) Isaiah Whitehead – G, Seton Hall (sophomore)
- (United States) Devin Williams – F, West Virginia (junior)
- (United States) Troy Williams – F, Indiana (junior)
- (United States) Stephen Zimmerman – C, UNLV (freshman)

==== International players ====
International players that had declared this year and didn't previously declare in another prior year can also drop out of the draft about 10 days before the draft begins on June 13. Initially, there were 46 players that expressed interest in entering the 2016 draft. However, at the end of June 13, there were 33 international prospects that, for one reason or another, declined entry to the 2016 NBA draft, leaving only 13 international candidates for the event. That left the overall number of underclassmen entering the draft as 72.

- (Democratic Republic of the Congo) Gracin Bakumanya – C/F, Olympique Antibes (France)
- (Croatia) Dragan Bender – F/C, Maccabi Tel Aviv (Israel)
- Isaia Cordinier – G, ASC Denain-Voltaire (France)
- Petr Cornelie – F/C, Le Mans Sarthe (France)
- Juan Hernangómez – F, Movistar Estudiantes (Spain)
- Furkan Korkmaz – G, Anadolu Efes (Turkey)
- (France) Timothé Luwawu-Cabarrot – G/F, Mega Leks (Serbia)
- Georgios Papagiannis – C, Panathinaikos (Greece)
- Guerschon Yabusele – F, Rouen Métropole (France)
- Rade Zagorac – G/F, Mega Leks (Serbia)
- Zhou Qi – C, Xinjiang Flying Tigers (China)
- Ante Žižić – C, KK Cibona (Croatia)
- (Croatia) Ivica Zubac – C, Mega Leks (Serbia)

=== Automatically eligible entrants ===
Players who do not meet the criteria for "international" players are automatically eligible if they meet any of the following criteria:

- They have completed four years of their college eligibility.
- If they graduated from high school in the U.S., but did not enroll in a U.S. college or university, four years have passed since their high school class graduated.
- They have signed a contract with a professional basketball team outside of the NBA, anywhere in the world, and have played under that contract.

Players who meet the criteria for "international" players are automatically eligible if they meet any of the following criteria:

- They are least 22 years old during the calendar year of the draft. In terms of dates, players born on or before December 31, 1994, are automatically eligible for the 2016 draft.
- They have signed a contract with a professional basketball team outside of the NBA within the United States, and have played under that contract.

Based on the eligibility rules, all college seniors who have completed their college eligibility and all "international" players who were born on or before December 31, 1994, are automatically eligible for the draft. However, there are other players who became automatically eligible even though they have not completed their four-year college eligibility.

Other automatically eligible players
| Player | Team | Note | Ref. |
|---|---|---|---|
| (United States) Brandon Austin | Orangeville A's (Canada) | Left college in 2015, playing professionally since 2015–16 season | |
| (Greece) Georgios Tsalmpouris | AEK Athens (Greece) | Left college in 2015, playing professionally since 2015–16 season | |

== Combine ==
The invitation-only NBA Draft Combine was held in Chicago from May 10 to 15. The on-court element of the combine took place on May 12 and 13. This year, a total of 63 players entered the combine, with the only two alternates that had their invitations be accepted for the event being Jaron Blossomgame and Marcus Lee. Furthermore, the only international player that got invited and accepted his invitation this year was Zhou Qi of the Xinjiang Flying Tigers. Originally, Wayne Selden Jr. was to be a participant for the event, but he injured himself before the combine officially began, thus making Sheldon McClellan from the Miami Hurricanes men's basketball team his replacement for on-court events. Buddy Hield, the consensus national college player of the year for 2015–16, participated only in off-court events; his graduation ceremony at the University of Oklahoma conflicted with the on-court portion of the combine, and he chose to attend graduation. A. J. Hammons also withdrew his name from the draft combine on the day of the on-court events.

During the event, sophomore Kentucky and future Phoenix Suns point guard Tyler Ulis broke combine records by being the lightest player recorded in draft combine history at 149.2 pounds. After the event, nine of the participants that were a part of the combine went back to their respective colleges. However, it was announced just days after the NBA Draft Combine was over that some of the events' measurements would be under review since some prospects were provided with rather questionable results, especially when compared to how they measured up in previous physical events.

== Draft lottery ==
The NBA conducts an annual lottery to determine the draft order for the teams did not make the playoffs in the preceding season. Every NBA team that missed the NBA playoffs had a chance at winning a top three pick, but teams with worse records had a better chance at winning a top three pick. After the lottery selected the teams that receive a top three pick the other teams receive an NBA draft pick based on their winning percentage from the prior season. As it is commonplace in the event of identical win–loss records, the NBA performed a random drawing to break the ties on April 15, 2016. The table below shows each non-playoff team's chances (based on their record at the end of the NBA season) of receiving picks 1–14.

The 2016 NBA lottery was held on May 17. The Philadelphia 76ers, who had the worst record in the NBA and the highest chance to win the lottery at 26.9% (given the 25% chance to win outright and 1.9% chance that the Sacramento Kings, with whom the 76ers had previously traded for pick-swap rights, would be drawn first), won the lottery. The Los Angeles Lakers stayed at the second spot, and the Brooklyn Nets (whose pick was acquired by the Boston Celtics via an earlier trade) stayed at the third spot. As a result, the only team that would have multiple selections in the lottery would be the Phoenix Suns, who hold their own fourth selection, which held the least likely odds of staying exactly where it was at out of all teams in the draft at 9.9%, and the thirteenth selection, which was acquired from the Washington Wizards earlier in the year and had a 97.8% chance of keeping Washington's selection (either at 96% with Pick 13 or at 1.8% at Pick 14). This was the first instance in NBA draft lottery history where every selection remained exactly where it was originally placed before the lottery began, which actually was held by 1.8% likelihood despite having a 1-in-55 chance of it happening due to the lottery selecting only the Top 3 slots.

| ^ | Denotes the actual lottery result |

| Team | 2015–16 record | Lottery chances | Lottery probabilities | | | | | | | | | | | | | |
| Team | 2015–16 record | Lottery chances | 1st | 2nd | 3rd | 4th | 5th | 6th | 7th | 8th | 9th | 10th | 11th | 12th | 13th | 14th |
|---|---|---|---|---|---|---|---|---|---|---|---|---|---|---|---|---|
| Philadelphia 76ers | 10–72 | 250 | .250^ | .215 | .178 | .357 | — | — | — | — | — | — | — | — | — | — |
| Los Angeles Lakers | 17–65 | 199 | .199 | .188^ | .171 | .319 | .123 | — | — | — | — | — | — | — | — | — |
| Brooklyn Nets | 21–61 | 156 | .156 | .157 | .156^ | .226 | .265 | .040 | — | — | — | — | — | — | — | — |
| Phoenix Suns | 23–59 | 119 | .119 | .126 | .133 | .099^ | .350 | .161 | .013 | — | — | — | — | — | — | — |
| Minnesota Timberwolves | 29–53 | 88 | .088 | .097 | .107 | — | .261^ | .360 | .084 | .004 | — | — | — | — | — | — |
| New Orleans Pelicans | 30–52 | 63 | .063 | .071 | .081 | — | — | .440^ | .304 | .040 | .001 | — | — | — | — | — |
| New York Knicks | 32–50 | 43 | .043 | .049 | .058 | — | — | — | .599^ | .232 | .018 | .000 | — | — | — | — |
| Sacramento Kings | 33–49 | 19 | .019 | .022 | .027 | — | — | — | — | .724^ | .197 | .011 | .000 | — | — | — |
| Denver Nuggets | 33–49 | 19 | .019 | .022 | .027 | — | — | — | — | — | .784^ | .143 | .005 | .000 | — | — |
| Milwaukee Bucks | 33–49 | 18 | .018 | .021 | .025 | — | — | — | — | — | — | .846^ | .087 | .002 | .000 | — |
| Orlando Magic | 35–47 | 8 | .008 | .009 | .012 | — | — | — | — | — | — | — | .907^ | .063 | .001 | .000 |
| Utah Jazz | 40–42 | 7 | .007 | .008 | .010 | — | — | — | — | — | — | — | — | .935^ | .039 | .000 |
| Washington Wizards | 41–41 | 6 | .006 | .007 | .009 | — | — | — | — | — | — | — | — | — | .960^ | .018 |
| Chicago Bulls | 42–40 | 5 | .005 | .006 | .007 | — | — | — | — | — | — | — | — | — | — | .982^ |

1: The Boston Celtics acquired the Brooklyn Nets' pick automatically.
2: The Denver Nuggets exercised the option to swap first round picks with the New York Knicks.
3: The Toronto Raptors acquired the lesser of the Denver Nuggets' pick and the New York Knicks' pick.
4: The Phoenix Suns acquired the Washington Wizards' pick because it fell outside the top nine.

== Invited attendees ==
The NBA annually invites around 15–20 players to sit in the so-called "green room", a special room set aside at the draft site for the invited players plus their families and agents. When their names are called, the player leaves the room and goes up on stage. Other players who are not invited are allowed to attend the ceremony. They sit in the stands with the fans and walk up on stage when (or if) they are drafted. The following 19 players were invited (listed alphabetically) to the 2016 NBA draft on June 18, one day before the 2016 NBA Finals ended. A record-high 5 different players were added to the green room listing before the beginning of the 2016 NBA draft commenced.

- (United States) Wade Baldwin IV, Vanderbilt
- (United States) Malik Beasley, Florida State (not on the original list, added later)
- (Croatia) Dragan Bender, Maccabi Tel Aviv
- (United States) Jaylen Brown, California
- (United States) Marquese Chriss, Washington
- (United States) Deyonta Davis, Michigan State
- (United States) Kris Dunn, Providence
- (United States) Henry Ellenson, Marquette
- (The Bahamas) Buddy Hield, Oklahoma
- (United States) Brandon Ingram, Duke
- (Haiti) Skal Labissière, Kentucky
- (France) Timothé Luwawu-Cabarrot, Mega Leks (not on the original list, added later)
- (United States) Dejounte Murray, Washington (not on the original list, added later)
- (Canada) Jamal Murray, Kentucky
- (Austria) Jakob Pöltl, Utah
- (United States) Malachi Richardson, Syracuse (not on the original list, added later)
- (Lithuania) Domantas Sabonis, Gonzaga
- (Australia) Ben Simmons, LSU
- (United States) Denzel Valentine, Michigan State (not on the original list, added later)

== Trades involving draft picks ==
=== Pre-draft trades ===
Prior to the day of the draft, the following trades were made and resulted in exchanges of draft picks between the teams.

=== Draft-day trades ===
Draft-day trades occurred on June 23, 2016, the day of the draft.

== See also ==
- List of first overall NBA draft picks
