= Emmanuel Malou =

Australian basketball player

Free agent
- Position: Forward

Personal information
- Born: 3 November 1993 (age 33) Kenya
- Listed height: 206 cm (6 ft 9 in)
- Listed weight: 98 kg (216 lb)

Career information
- High school: St. Thomas More (Oakdale, Connecticut); Box Hill Senior Secondary College (Melbourne, Victoria); ABCD Basketball Academy (Des Moines, Iowa)
- College: Yuba (2014–2015)
- NBA draft: 2016: undrafted

Career history
- 2018: Tallinna Kalev/TLÜ
- 2019: Albury Wodonga Bandits
- 2021: Sanat Mes Rafsanjan
- 2021: Mackay Meteors
- 2021–2022: Adelaide 36ers
- 2023: Amartha Hangtuah
- 2023: Bangui Sporting Club

Emmanuel Martin Malou (born 3 November 1993) is a South Sudanese-Australian professional basketball player who last played for Bangui Sporting Club.

== Early life ==
Malou was born in Kenya to a Sudanese father and Ethiopian mother. He moved with his parents and two siblings to the Australian city of Melbourne, Victoria, in 1996. Malou did not initially like basketball but it became the focal point of his life when he had a growth spurt to 6 ft 6 in (1.98 m) during his early teenage years.

In 2010, Malou convinced his parents to allow him to move to the United States so he could attend St. Thomas More School in Oakdale, Connecticut, for its basketball program. He returned to Australia after the conclusion of the school year and suffered a knee injury while attempting a dunk that sidelined him for months. Malou did not return to St. Thomas More and instead stayed in Australia while attending Box Hill Senior Secondary College.

Malou was convinced by American former basketball player Glendon Alexander to join his ABCD Basketball Academy in Des Moines, Iowa, in 2012. Malou lived in a motel room with other participants despite the program being portrayed as an elite basketball preparatory; Malou persevered because he was "so desperate". Alexander persuaded Malou to enter the 2013 NBA draft but Malou withdrew his name when he suffered a severe ankle injury. Malou returned to ABCD for a second season and lived in a shared house with teammates where they suffered from food shortages, power outages and no hot water. Malou played with ABCD as they travelled across the country in a van to play games. He earned the attention of Fred Hoiberg, the head coach of the Iowa State Cyclones, but ABCD did not offer academic work towards a high school diploma and Malou would not have been eligible to play in NCAA Division I. He left ABCD to return to Australia in 2014.

== College career ==
Malou signed with the College of Southern Idaho in 2014 but was ruled ineligible by the National Junior College Athletic Association (NJCAA). Southern Idaho recommended Malou to the California-based Yuba College, which operated separately from the NJCAA and allowed Malou to play. California junior colleges do not provide athletic scholarships so Malou and his family covered tuition, rent, food and all other payments while he was attending Yuba.

Malou averaged 14.7 points, 8.5 rebounds and 3.3 blocks during the 2014–15 season. He was visited by National Basketball Association (NBA) scouts and received attention from several Division I programs before he announced his intentions to join the Iowa State Cyclones in September 2015. Malou transferred to Des Moines Area Community College to focus on his academics and did not play basketball during the 2015–16 season.

Malou declared for the 2016 NBA draft after initially entering as a backup plan if the National Collegiate Athletic Association (NCAA) ruled him ineligible to play for the Cyclones. The issues stemmed from Malou's time at ABCD Basketball Academy.

== Professional career ==
Malou was not selected in the 2016 NBA draft. He suffered a ruptured cyst in his knee and missed the 2016 NBA Summer League.

Malou played two games for the Estonian team Tallinna Kalev/TLÜ in 2018.

On 11 April 2019, Malou signed with the Albury Wodonga Bandits of NBL1 as an injury replacement for Mitch Newton. On 13 March 2020, Malou signed with the Mackay Meteors of NBL1 North before the 2020 NBL1 season was cancelled. On 7 January 2021, he signed a one-year deal with Sanat Mes Rafsanjan in Iran. Malou returned to play for the Mackay Meteors during the 2021 season.

On 28 July 2021, Malou signed with the Adelaide 36ers of the National Basketball League (NBL) for the 2021–22 season.

In October 2023, Malou was on the roster of Bangui Sporting Club in the 2024 tournament of the Road to BAL.

== National team career ==
Malou has played for the South Sudanese men's basketball team.
