= 1975 FIBA Intercontinental Cup =

- League: FIBA Intercontinental Cup
- Sport: Basketball
- Finals champions: (Italy) Birra Forst Cantù
- Runners-up: (Brazil) Amazonas Franca

FIBA Intercontinental Cup seasons
- ← 1974 FIBA Intercontinental Cup 1976 FIBA Intercontinental Cup →

The 1975 FIBA Intercontinental Cup William Jones was the 9th edition of the FIBA Intercontinental Cup for men's basketball clubs. It took place at Varese and Cantù, Italy.

== Participants ==
Continent	Teams	Clubs		
Europe	3	(Italy) Mobilgirgi Varese	(Spain) Real Madrid	(Italy) Birra Forst Cantù
Africa	1	(Central African Republic) Hit Trésor		
North America	1	(United States) Penn Quakers		
South America	1	(Brazil) Amazonas Franca		

== League stage ==
Day 1, September 13, 1975

Team 1	Score	Team 2
Penn Quakers (United States)	106–74	(Central African Republic) Hit Trésor
Birra Forst Cantù (Italy)	82–81	(Brazil) Amazonas Franca
Mobilgirgi Varese (Italy)	75–77	(Spain) Real Madrid

Day 2, September 14, 1975

Team 1	Score	Team 2
Hit Trésor (Central African Republic)	58–112	(Spain) Real Madrid
Amazonas Franca (Brazil)	68–67	(Italy) Mobilgirgi Varese
Birra Forst Cantù (Italy)	112–88	(United States) Penn Quakers

Day 3, September 15, 1975

Team 1	Score	Team 2
Amazonas Franca (Brazil)	109–55	(Central African Republic) Hit Trésor
Real Madrid (Spain)	98–81	(United States) Penn Quakers
Mobilgirgi Varese (Italy)	87–83	(Italy) Birra Forst Cantù

Day 4, September 16, 1975

Team 1	Score	Team 2
Penn Quakers (United States)	81–93	(Brazil) Amazonas Franca
Mobilgirgi Varese (Italy)	84–68	(Central African Republic) Hit Trésor
Birra Forst Cantù (Italy)	96–94	(Spain) Real Madrid

Day 5, September 17, 1975

Team 1	Score	Team 2
Hit Trésor (Central African Republic)	76–120	(Italy) Birra Forst Cantù
Amazonas Franca (Brazil)	80–79	(Spain) Real Madrid
Mobilgirgi Varese (Italy)	82–95	(United States) Penn Quakers

== Final standings ==
	Team	Pld	Pts	W	L	PF	PA
1.	(Italy) Birra Forst Cantù	5	9	4	1	493	426
2.	(Brazil) Amazonas Franca	5	9	4	1	431	364
3.	(Spain) Real Madrid	5	8	3	2	460	390
4.	(United States) Penn Quakers	5	7	2	3	451	459
5.	(Italy) Mobilgirgi Varese	5	7	2	3	395	391
6.	(Central African Republic) Hit Trésor	5	5	0	5	331	531

1975 FIBA Intercontinental Cup Champions

Birra Forst Cantù
1st title
