= Bangui Basketball League =

- Country: Central African Republic
- Region: Bangui
- Confederation: FIBA Africa
- Number of teams: 14
- Level on pyramid: 1
- International cup: Basketball Africa League (BAL)
- Current champions: New Tech Université (1st title) (2025)
- Most championships: Abeilles; Tondema (3 titles)

The Bangui Basketball League (in French: Ligue de Basketball de Bangui) is a semi-professional basketball league in Bangui, Central African Republic. It is the highest level basketball league in the country, as the national federation organises no national league.

== Teams ==
- ABC
- Abeilles
- AS Tongolo
- ASOPT
- Bantou
- BEAC
- BEAfrica
- Harlem
- Hit Trésor
- Mazanga
- Plateau
- Red Star
- Tondema
- Toukia

== Champions ==
- 2003: Tondema
- 2006: AS Mazanga
- 2013: Tondema
- 2015: New Tech Bantou
- 2017: Abeilles
- 2019: Abeilles
- 2021: Tondema
- 2022: Bangui Sporting Club
- 2023: Bangui Sporting Club
- 2024: Abeilles
- 2025: New Tech Université

== Finals ==
Season	Champions	Runners-up	Finals score
2013	Tondema	ASOPT	59–57
2019	Abeilles	Hit Trésor	76–46
2021	Tondema	GIBA-BCAGS	65–58
2022	Bangui Sporting Club	Abeilles	54–41
2023	Bangui Sporting Club	New Tech Université	2–0 (series)
2024	Abeilles	Bangui Sporting Club	1–0 (Note: The 2024 finals series between Abeilles and Bangui Sporting Club was supposed to be a best-of-three series. However, during the first game a Bangui Sporting Club player attacked the referee, which led to an automatic win for Abeilles, who were awarded the championship.)
2024	New Tech Université	Tondema	2–0

=== MVP Award ===
Season	Player	Team
2019	Sissoko Cheik	Abeilles
