= Tondema =

- League: Bangui Basketball League
- Founded: 1976
- Arena: Palais des Sports
- Location: Bangui, Central African Republic
- President: Fiacre Ndingatoloum
- Head coach: Jean Robert Madozein
- Championships: 2003, 2013, 2021

Tondema is a Central African basketball club based in Bangui. Founded in 1976, the team plays in the Bangui Basketball League and won the championship in 2003, 2013, and 2021.

In October 2021, Tondema played in the qualifying tournament of the Basketball Africa League (BAL) for the first time.

== Honours ==
Bangui Basketball League

- Champions: 2003, 2013, 2021

== Players ==
=== Current roster ===
The following is the Tondema roster for the 2022 BAL Qualifying Tournaments.

Note: Flags indicate national team eligibility at FIBA-sanctioned events. Players may hold other non-FIBA nationalities not displayed.

Tondema roster
Players
Coaches

Pos.	No.	Nat.	Name
PG	4	(Central African Republic)	Sokambi, Jean
	5	(Central African Republic)	Mbombo, Francky
	11	(Central African Republic)	Kabylo-Bereke, Rodrigue
	12	(Central African Republic)	Gallo-Galtia, Jephte
	13	(Central African Republic)	Mokama, Prince
PF	15	(Central African Republic)	Ngaïfei, Omega
		(Central African Republic)	Baba, Martin
		(Central African Republic)	Gobo-Ndemayo, Brice

Head coach

- (Central African Republic) Jean Robert Madozein

Assistant coach(es)

- (Central African Republic) Tanguy Ngassio

Legend

- (C) Team captain
- Injured

- Roster
Updated: October 29, 2021
