= Hit Trésor SC =

Hit Trésor
- Leagues: Central African League
- Founded: 1962; 64 years ago
- Location: Bangui, Central African Republic

Hit Trésor Sporting Club is a professional basketball team that is based in Bangui, Central African Republic. Founded in 1962, they compete in the Central African League.

== History ==
Hit Trésor won the FIBA Africa Clubs Champions Cup twice, in the years 1973 and 1976, and they competed at the 1975 edition of the Intercontinental Cup.

== Honours ==
National Cup

- Champions: 2014

FIBA Africa Clubs Champions Cup

- Champions (2): 1973, 1978
  - Third place: 1975
